= Kundé (music awards) =

Burkinabè music award

- Awarded for: Excellence in Burkinabè music and African music
- Country: Burkina Faso
- Presented by: Commissariat général des Kundé
- Formerly called: Balafons d'Or
- Status: Active
- Established: 1996; 30 years ago
- Website: kunde.bf

Television/radio coverage
- Network: Radiodiffusion Télévision du Burkina

Kundé is an annual music awards ceremony held in Ouagadougou, Burkina Faso. It recognizes artists and musical works from Burkina Faso and other parts of Africa. The awards were established in 2001 and are organized by the Kundé General Secretariat (Commissariat général des Kundé), which Salfo Soré, also known as Jah Press, headed for many years.

The awards cover categories including traditional music, religious music, modern music influenced by traditional styles, music videos, female artists, emerging artists, and collaborations. They also recognize artists from other African countries, members of the Burkinabè diaspora, and international artists based in Burkina Faso. The Kundé d'Or (Golden Kundé) is awarded to the Burkinabè Artist of the Year. The ceremony is generally held on the last Friday of April. The 2020 ceremony was cancelled because of the COVID-19 pandemic. Subsequent ceremonies returned to the annual schedule.

== History ==
Salfo Soré, better known by his pseudonym Jah Press, one of the founders of the Kundé.

The project that later became Kundé was initiated by Salfo Soré, better known by his pseudonym Jah Press, in partnership with Sol Touré, a former radio host at Radio Pulsar in Ouagadougou. It was conceived in 1996 under the name Balafons d'Or with the aim of recognizing and promoting Burkinabè and African music.

In 1999, Jah Press met with Culture Minister Mahamoudou Ouédraogo, who suggested replacing the name Balafons d'Or with one that would better reflect Burkina Faso's ethnic diversity. The suggestion was partly based on the association of the balafon with the country's southwestern region. Jah Press subsequently selected the name Kundé after researching the term at the National Museum of Music. Kundé is a Mooré name for a three-string guitar found in several regions of Burkina Faso. The first edition was held on 9 February 2001, five years after the project was conceived, following a delay attributed to an insufficient number of musical releases. By 2001, Sol Touré had moved to the United States.

== Organization ==
The Kundé General Secretariat (Commissariat général des Kundé) organizes and coordinates the awards under Bizart Productions. It is headquartered in Cité An II, at 72 Avenue Georges Tassembédo in Ouagadougou.

The Secretariat is headed by Jah Press, who serves as the general commissioner (Commissaire général). Other principal members include Boureima Djiga, commissioner for selection (Commissaire à la sélection); Ismaïla Zongo, artistic commissioner (Commissaire artistique); Maguy Leslie Oka, commissioner for public relations and marketing (Commissaire aux relations publiques et au marketing); Gervais Somda, also known as Mister Pee, commissioner for administration and logistics (Commissaire à l'administration et à la logistique); and Boukary Ouédraogo, also known as Almamy Becker, communications officer (Chargé de communication).

=== Selection and venues ===
The selection process uses an annual eligibility period known as the "Kundé year" (année des Kundé). Eligible works are generally required to have been released between 1 March of the preceding year and the end of February of the award year. An observatory of music professionals and media representatives monitors musical releases and their commercial and media performance and contributes to the selection of nominees in the various categories.

For the 2014 edition, organizers stated that eligible artists were expected to have released a work during the eligibility period, achieved commercial or media success, and performed several concerts. The number of musical works considered by the awards increased over time. Organizers reported 286 eligible works in 2013, 298 in 2014, 399 in 2015, and 459 in 2016. In 2026, they reported 1,331 works, the highest number reported for an edition of the awards.

Ouagadougou is the host city for the Kundé ceremony. The inaugural ceremony was held at Ciné Neerwaya in 2001. The Salle des Banquets de Ouaga 2000 hosted the Kundé ceremonies in 2002–2007, (Note: Multiple sources:) 2013–2017, and 2023–2026. The site of the International Arts and Crafts Fair of Ouagadougou (Salon international de l'artisanat de Ouagadougou; SIAO) hosted the ceremonies in 2008, 2009, and 2010. The Palais des Sports de Ouaga 2000 hosted the ceremonies in 2011, 2012, 2018, 2019, and 2021.

=== Categories ===
Kundé are divided into two groups: main awards (prix principaux) and special awards (prix spéciaux). The Kundé General Secretariat lists 10 main categories and five special categories. Honorary and tribute Kundé awards may also be presented separately. The categories may be adjusted according to the musical production of the relevant "Kundé year".

Main awards (Note: French: prix principaux)
Kundé d'Or
Best Female Artist
Best Traditional Music Artist
Best Religious Music Artist
Best Modern Song Inspired by Traditional Music
Most Played Artist in Nightclubs
Best Music Video
Revelation of the Year
Hope of the Year
Best Burkinabè Collaboration (featuring)

Special awards (Note: French: prix spéciaux)
Best Burkinabè Artist of the Diaspora
Best Foreign Artist Living in Burkina Faso
Best West African Artist
Best Central African Artist
Best African Integration Collaboration

Earlier editions also included an East African Artist category, which was present in 2015 but absent from the five-category special-award structure published in 2016.

==== Honorary and tribute awards ====
The Kundé also presents Kundé d'honneur and Kundé d'hommage awards. These are separate from the competitive categories and recognize artists and other contributors for their work in African music. The number and types of honorary awards change from year to year, with recipients recognized for their careers, emerging talent, or significant achievements.

=== Voting ===
The Kundé has used both jury assessment and public voting, with the system varying by edition. In the 2014 and 2018 editions, the jury accounted for 75% of the Kundé d'Or result and the public vote for 25%. Kundé commissioner Jah Press said that the jury used defined criteria, which could produce a result different from the public vote.

Alif Naaba, the winner of the 2014 Kundé d'Or

The Kundé also has a separate Kundé du public (Public Award). Consequently, the artist receiving the largest share of the public vote does not necessarily win the Kundé d'Or. In 2014, Bil Aka Kora received 76% of the public vote, while Alif Naaba won the Kundé d'Or under the jury-based weighting system. In 2018, Abibou Sawadogo received 63.28% of the public vote and won the Kundé du public, while Hawa Boussim won the Kundé d'Or after the jury's assessment.

Public voting has been conducted by mobile phone. In 2002, voting took place through press organizations, production companies, bars and dance clubs, the Burkina Faso Copyright Office (Bureau burkinabè du droit d'auteur; BBDA), and electronic voting. In 2003, the organizers partnered with the IT company NetAccess to enable Internet voting. In 2014, voting took place through the Airtel network. By 2021, the Public Award used Orange SMS voting, with voters sending codes corresponding to the nominees.

== Editions ==
=== 2001 ===
The first edition took place on 9 February 2001 at Ciné Neerwaya in Ouagadougou.

Category	Winner
Kundé d'Or	Solo Dja Kabaco
Best Artist of All Time	Georges Ouédraogo
Best Modern Song Inspired by Traditional Music	Bil Aka Kora
Most Played Artist in Nightclubs	Solo Dja Kabaco
Best Music Video	"Bi Tiélou" (Solo Dja Kabaco)
Revelation of the Year	ZMO
Best Female Artist	Amity Méria
Best West African Artist (Special Prize)	Magic System (Côte d'Ivoire)

=== 2002 ===
Sami Rama, the Best Female Artist of the second edition

The second edition was held on 6 April 2002 at the Salle des Banquets de Ouaga 2000 and was organized by Bizart Production. Five new categories were introduced, including Best West African Artist, Best Foreign Artist Living in Burkina Faso, and Best Caribbean Artist. The edition also introduced the Kundé d'Hommage (Honorary Kundé), which recognized artists for their contributions to Burkinabè music. The Honorary Kundé was awarded to Black So Man, who had died the previous month.

The ceremony opened with a performance by the group Africando. The General Commission of Kundé recognized Moussa Kaboré of Bazar Musique and Seydou Richard Traoré, CEO of Seydoni Productions, for their support of Burkinabè music. Burkinabè fashion designer Coraille presented a fashion show. Guests included Burkina Faso's First Lady, Chantal Compaoré, who was the patron of the ceremony, and Minister of Arts and Culture Mahamoudou Ouédraogo.

Type	Category	Winner
Main Award	Kundé d'Or	Bil Aka Kora
Main Award	Best Male Traditional Artist	Zougnazagmda
Main Award	Best Modern Song Inspired by Traditional Music	Bil Aka Kora
Main Award	Most Played Artist in Nightclubs	Sonia Carré d'As
Main Award	Best Music Video	"Silmandé" (Pascal Kaboré)
Main Award	Revelation of the Year	Pascal Kaboré
Main Award	Best Female Artist	Sami Rama
Special Prize	Best Burkinabè Artist in the Diaspora	Founi Faya
Special Prize	Best West African Artist	Africando
Special Prize	Best Central African Artist	Werrason (Democratic Republic of the Congo)
Special Prize	Best Caribbean Artist	Jacky Rapon (French Antilles)
Special Prize	Best Foreign Artist Living in Burkina Faso	Al Tchengo (Cameroon)
Kundé d'Hommage	Tribute Award	Black So Man
Kundé d'Honneur	Honorary Award	Moussa Kaboré
Kundé d'Honneur	Honorary Award	Seydou Richard Traoré

=== 2003 ===
Yeleen, a Burkinabè hip-hop group composed of Célestin Mawndoé (left) from Chad and Smarty (right) from Burkina Faso, won the Most Played Artist in Nightclubs and Revelation of the Year at the third edition.

The third edition, initially scheduled for 5 April 2003, was postponed to 30 April 2003 and held at the Salle des Banquets de Ouaga 2000 under the patronage of Chantal Compaoré. The postponement was attributed to insufficient sponsorship to meet the 40 million CFA franc budget and to the inability of the Cultural Initiatives Support Programs (Programmes de soutien aux initiatives culturelles; PSIC), a major partner, to provide assistance to the General Secretariat.

Type	Category	Winner
Main Award	Kundé d'Or	Georges Ouédraogo
Main Award	Best Male Traditional Artist	Kisto Koinbré
Main Award	Best Female Traditional Artist	Abibou Sawadogo
Main Award	Best Modern Song Inspired by Traditional Music	"Ba-Yir-Deem" (Georges Ouédraogo)
Main Award	Most Played Artist in Nightclubs	Yeleen
Main Award	Best Music Video	"Apouri" (Bil Aka Kora)
Main Award	Revelation of the Year	Yeleen
Main Award	Best Female Artist	Jeanne Bicaba
Special Award	Best Burkinabè Artist in the Diaspora	Aly Verhutey
Special Award	Best West African Artist	Salif Keita (Mali)
Special Award	Best Central African Artist	Extra Musica (Republic of the Congo)
Special Award	Best Caribbean Artist	Alan Cavé (Haiti)
Special Award	Best Francophone Song	"Seul" (Garou)
Special Award	Best Foreign Artist Living in Burkina Faso	Lennox & D (Trinidad and Tobago)
Kundé d'Honneur	Honorary Award	G.G. Vickey

=== 2004 ===
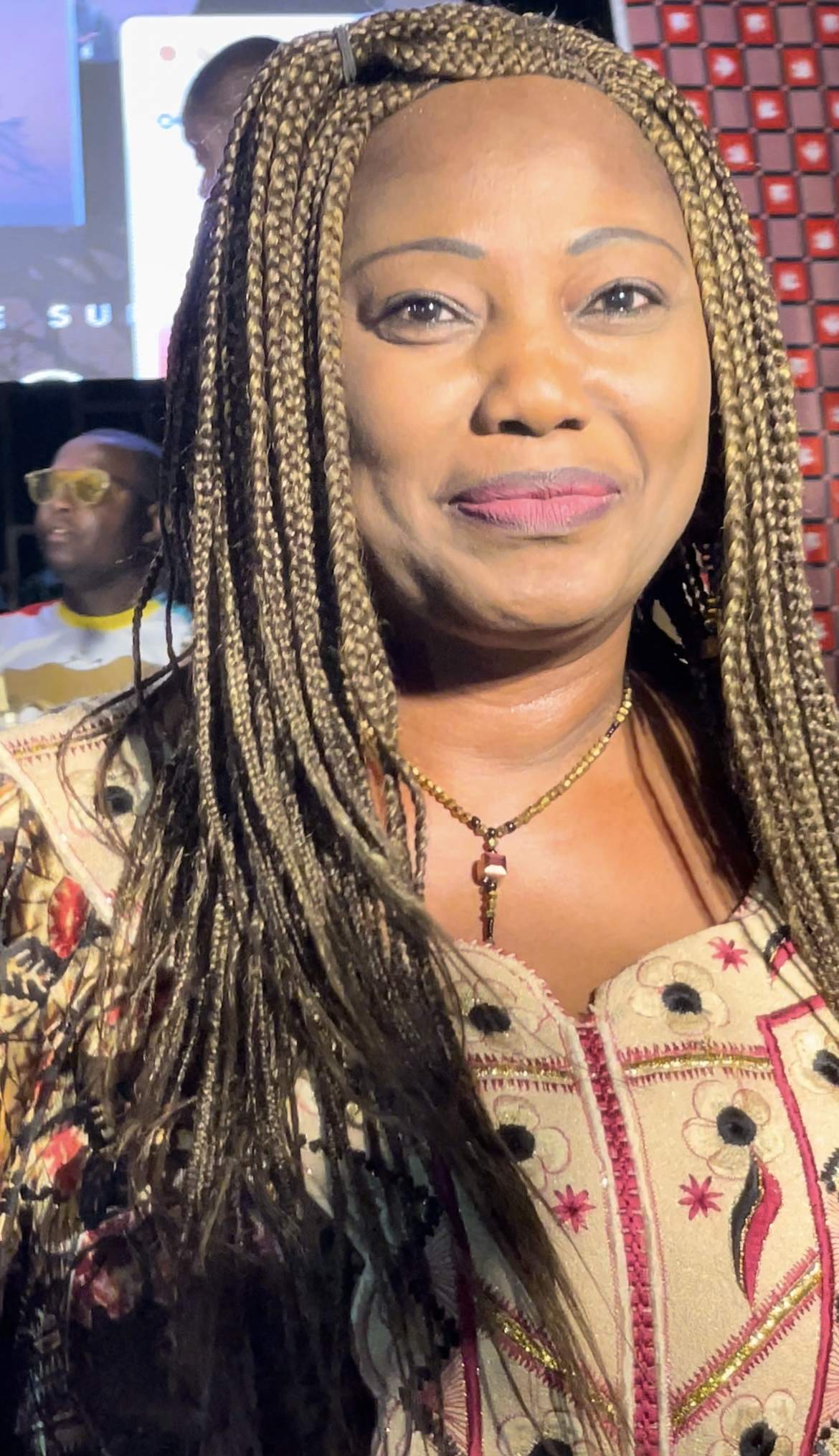
Amity Meria won the Kundé d'Or and Best Female Artist at the fourth edition

On 24 March 2004, the Kundé organizing committee met with the press to discuss preparations for the fourth edition and the nominated artists. The organizers reported a budget of 50 million CFA francs. The fourth edition introduced the Kundé for Integration and the Kundé for Best Director. The former was intended to encourage artists to promote peace and subregional integration, while the latter recognized technicians involved in music video production. By 27 April, the budget had not yet been fully secured, although preparations were continuing. The fourth edition was held on 30 April 2004 at the Salle des Banquets de Ouaga 2000 and was covered by Radio France Internationale and TV5Monde. The ceremony included performances by veteran artists, including Bailly Spinto and Tabu Ley Rochereau.

Type	Category	Winner
Main Award	Kundé d'Or	Amity Méria
Main Award	Best Male Traditional Artist	Zongo Adama
Main Award	Best Female Traditional Artist	Nana Bibata
Main Award	Best Modern Song Inspired by Traditional Music	"Bondomayé" (Kindiss)
Main Award	Most Played Artist in Nightclubs	Sofaa
Main Award	Best Music Video	"Papa Noel" (Madson Junior)
Main Award	Revelation of the Year	Wedyack
Main Award	Best Female Artist	Amity Méria
Main Award	Best Burkinabè Artist in the Diaspora	Alif Naaba
Main Award	Best West African Artist	Ricos Campos (Benin)
Main Award	Best Central African Artist	Barbara Kanam (Democratic Republic of the Congo)
Main Award	Best Caribbean Artist	Patrick Andrey Mitram (Martinique)
Special Award	Best Francophone Song	"Laisse parler les gens" (Jocelyne Labylle, Cheela, Passi and Jacob Desvarieux)
Special Award	Integration Award	"Abénan" (Meiway)
Special Award	Best Director	Seydoni Production — "Samedi sera" by Sofaa
Kundé d'Honneur	Honorary Award for pioneers and promoters of Burkinabè hip-hop	Gérard Evo Koala; Gervais Somda (Mister Pi); Smockey
Kundé d'Hommage	Tribute Award	Sylvain Mosac Demé; Yaya Popsy Diallo

=== 2005 ===
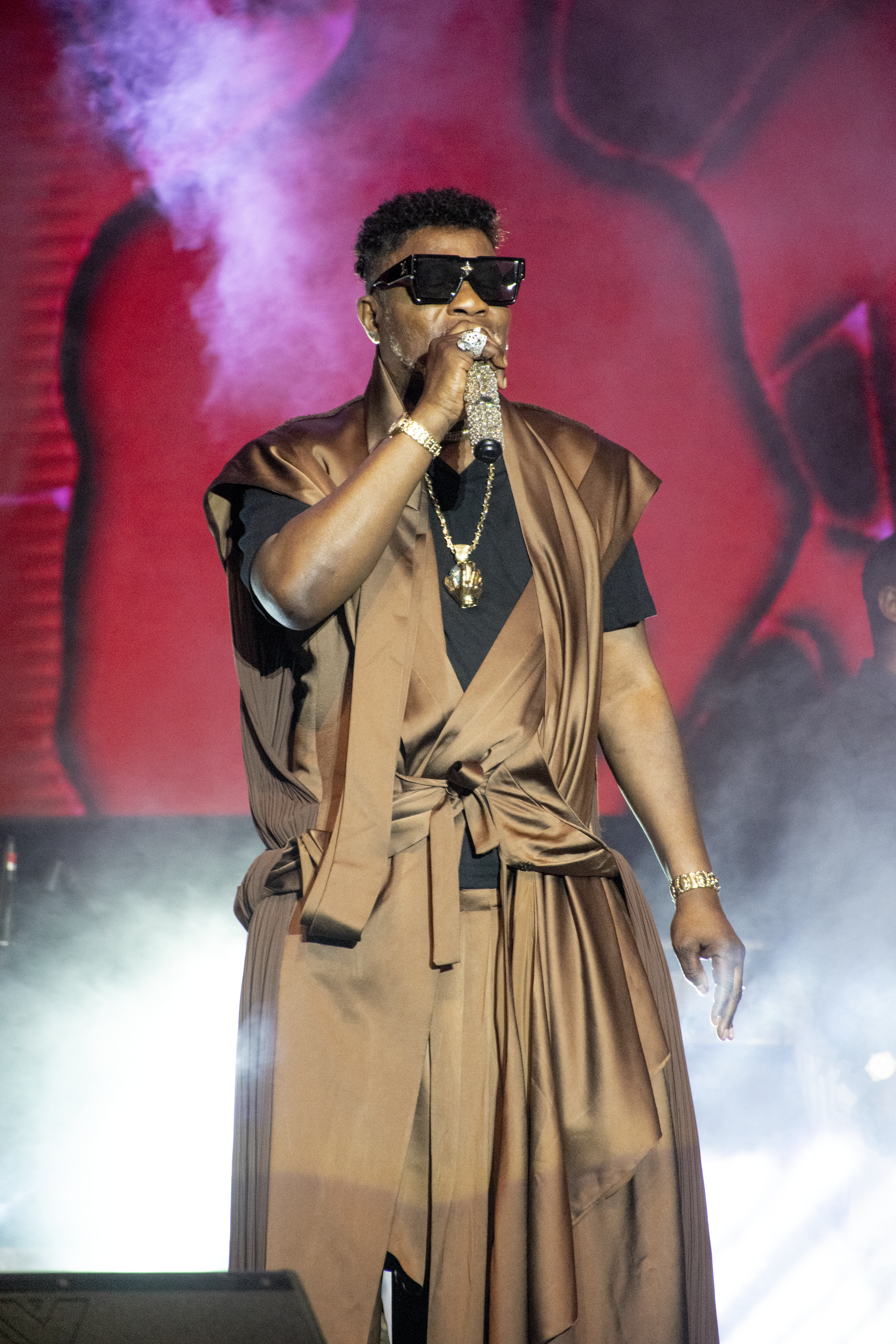
Koffi Olomidé won the Best Central African Artist at the fifth edition

The fifth edition was held on 29 April 2005 at the Salle des Banquets de Ouaga 2000. Bil Aka Kora won the Kundé d'Or. The ceremony was broadcast by Radio Télévision du Burkina, Africable, and CFI TV.

The program featured "Le Gouvernement", a rap project involving Burkinabè artists, as well as performances by Djata, Alif Naaba, Yoni, Kojo Antwi of Ghana, and Babani Koné of Mali. Other performers included Onel Mbala, Tata Kenny, David Tayrault, Magic System, Théo Blaise Kounkou, and Mohamed Lamine.

Type	Category	Winner
Main Award	Kundé d'Or	Bil Aka Kora
Main Award	Best Male Traditional Artist	Zougnazagmda
Main Award	Best Female Traditional Artist	Abibou Sawadogo
Main Award	Best Modern Song Inspired by Traditional Music	"Dibayagui" (Bil Aka Kora)
Main Award	Most Played Artist in Nightclubs	AS Dj
Main Award	Best Music Video	"Zamana" (Smockey)
Main Award	Revelation of the Year	Faso Kombat
Main Award	Best Female Artist	Basta Diabaté
Special Award	Best Burkinabè Artist in the Diaspora	Dumba Kultur
Special Award	Best West African Artist	Meiway (Côte d'Ivoire)
Special Award	Best Central African Artist	Koffi Olomide (Democratic Republic of the Congo)
Special Award	Best Caribbean Artist	Patrick Andrey Mitram (Martinique)
Special Award	Best Francophone Song	"Un Gaou a Oran" (Magic System, 113, and Mohammed Lamine)
Special Award	Integration Award	Yeleen and Prisca
Special Award	Best Director	Marc de Becker — "Manivelle"
Kundé d'Honneur	Honorary Award	Théo Blaise Kounkou

=== 2006 ===
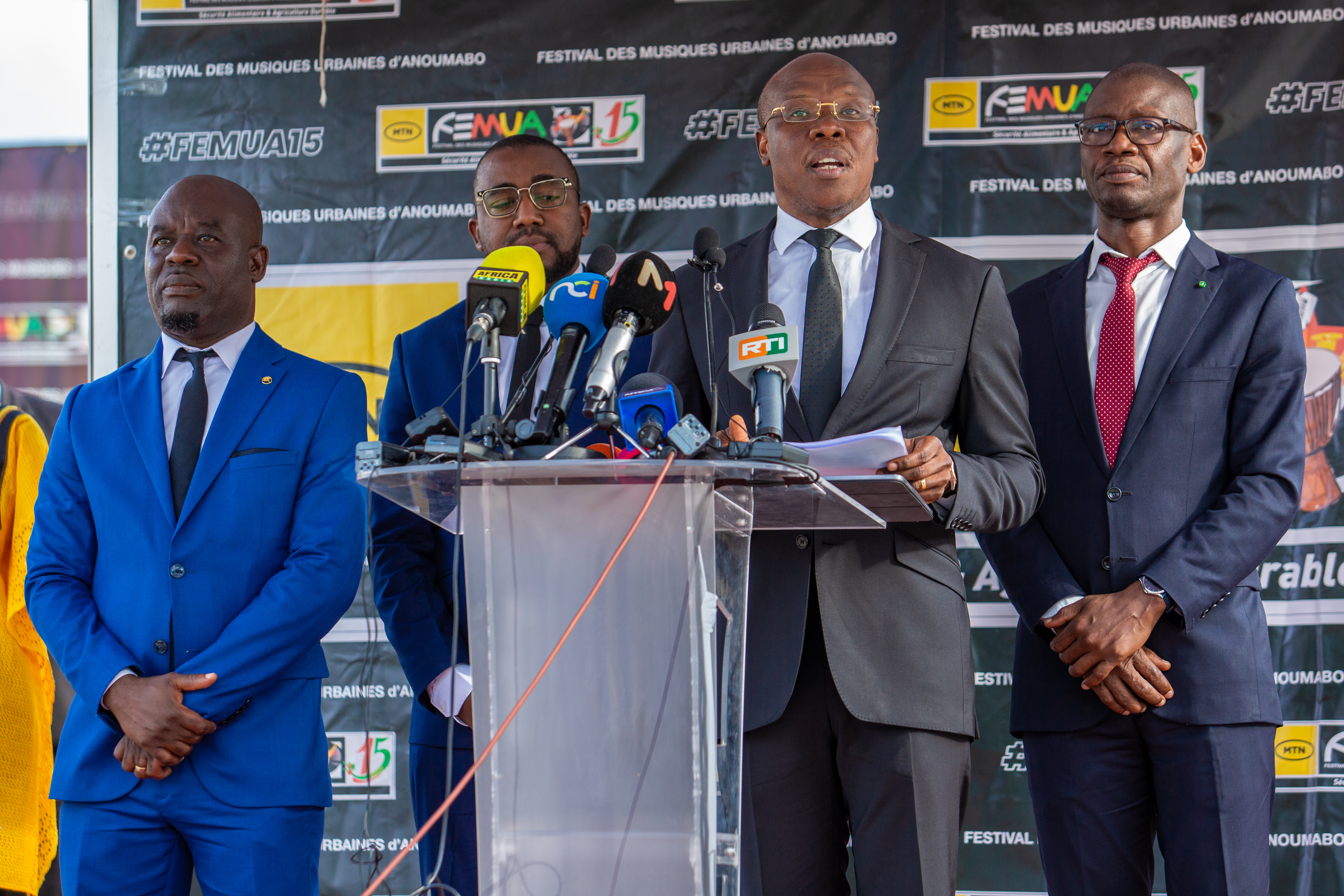
Magic System won the Best West African Artist at the sixth edition

Held on 29 April 2006 at the Salle des Banquets de Ouaga 2000, the sixth edition was placed under the patronage of Chantal Compaoré.

Smockey, a figure in Burkina Faso's hip-hop and rap scene, won the Kundé d'Or. The jury was chaired by producer and music publisher Désiré Bationo. Alif Naaba received more than 11,000 public votes, representing over 60% of the total, compared with approximately 4,000 votes for Smockey and Solo Dja Kabaco. The Kundé d'Or carried a cash prize of 1 million CFA francs, while the other main prizes carried 150,000 CFA francs.

Type	Category	Winner
Main Award	Kundé d'Or	Smockey
Main Award	Best Male Traditional Artist	Drissa Ouédraogo
Main Award	Best Female Traditional Artist	Kayaba Sawadogo
Main Award	Best Modern Religious Music Artist	Simon Kologo
Main Award	Best Song Inspired by Traditional Music	"Burkina Faso" (Bezou)
Main Award	Most Played Artist in Nightclubs	Hamed Smani
Main Award	Best Music Video	"Votez pour moi" (Smockey)
Main Award	Best Director	Boubacar Diallo (Les Films du Dromadaire)
Main Award	Best Arranger	Sam Étienne Zongo
Main Award	Revelation of the Year	Hamed Smani
Main Award	Hope of the Year	Awa Sissao
Main Award	Best Female Artist	Djata
Special Award	Best Burkinabè Artist in the Diaspora	Ousmenez
Special Award	Best West African Artist	Magic System (Côte d'Ivoire)
Special Award	Best Caribbean Artist	Médhy Custos (Guadeloupe)
Special Award	Best Francophone Song	Alif Naaba

=== 2007 ===
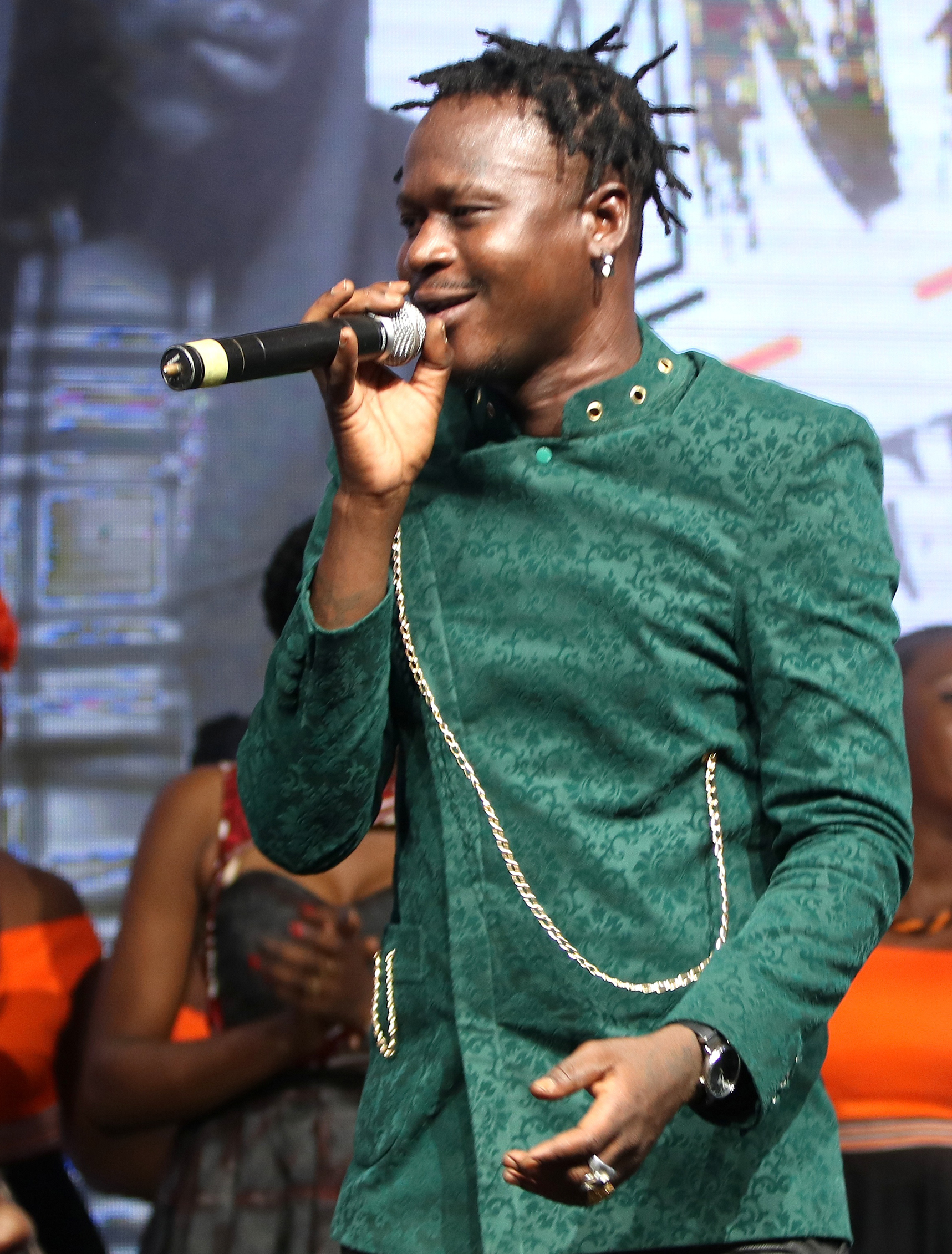
Floby won the Most Played Artist in Nightclubs and Revelation of the Year at the seventh edition

The seventh edition was held on 27 April 2007 at the Salle des Banquets de Ouaga 2000. The General Secretariat introduced a Public Prize following criticism of the previous year's result. The ceremony featured performances by Amadou Dicko, Ousmenez and Acee 1er, Daouda Koné, Nayanka Bell, DJ Lewis, Génération Partage, and Yeleen. DJ Lewis was associated with the "avian flu" dance, while Génération Partage included Sami, Floby, Dudn'J, Mandowé, Sisao, Leekma, and David of Faso Komba.

Type	Category	Winner
Main Award	Kundé d'Or	Yeleen
Main Award	Best Traditional Artist	Abibou Sawadogo
Main Award	Best Modern Religious Music Artist	Mme Séraphin Bance
Main Award	Best Modern Song Inspired by Traditional Music	"I-Yamma" (Smockey)
Main Award	Most Played Artist in Nightclubs	Floby
Main Award	Best Music Video	Yeleen — "Dar Es Salam", directed by Gédéon Vink
Main Award	Revelation of the Year	Floby
Main Award	Hope of the Year	Yili Nooma
Main Award	Best Female Artist	Sami Rama
Special Award	Best Burkinabè Artist in the Diaspora	Zêdess
Special Award	Best Foreign Artist Living in Burkina Faso	Pata-Pata DJ
Special Award	Best West African Artist	Bétika (Côte d'Ivoire)
Special Award	Best Caribbean Artist	Daan Junior (Haiti)
Special Award	Public Award	Yeleen
Kundé d'Honneur	Honorary Award	Désiré Traoré
Kundé d'Honneur	Honorary Award	Jean Paul Sawadogo
Kundé d'Hommage	Tribute Award	Gaston Palé
Kundé d'Hommage	Tribute Award	Douk Saga

=== 2008 ===
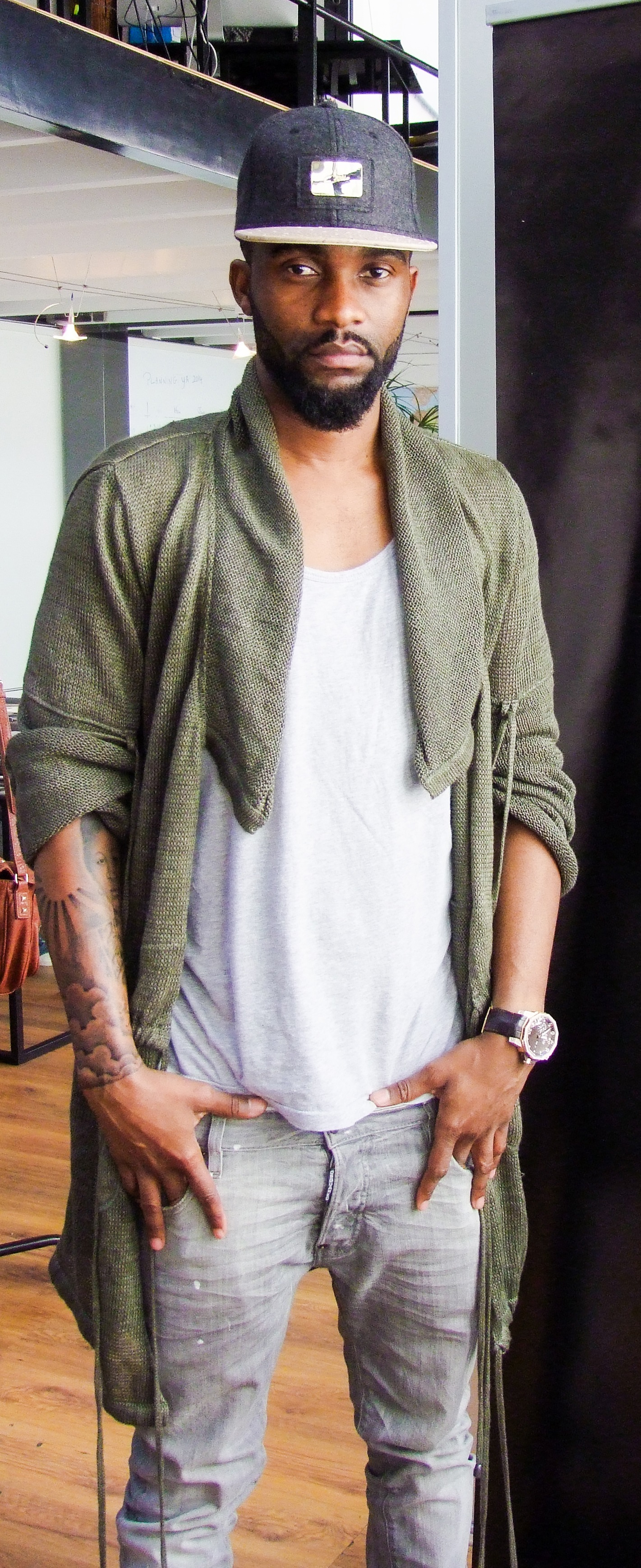
Fally Ipupa won the Best Central African Artist at the eighth edition

The eighth edition took place on 25 April at the site of the International Arts and Crafts Fair of Ouagadougou (Salon international de l'artisanat de Ouagadougou; SIAO). The venue was chosen because the Salle des Banquets de Ouaga 2000 could no longer accommodate the number of spectators wishing to attend the ceremony. A second hall had previously been used as an overflow space, where spectators watched the event on a large screen.

The National Organizing Committee worked with organizations such as the Burkina Faso Copyright Office (Bureau burkinabè du droit d'auteur; BBDA) in the selection process. Yoni (born Yoni Abdou Dramane) received the Kundé d'Or from Chantal Compaoré. Minister of Culture, Tourism and Communication and government spokesman Filippe Savadogo also attended.

The performances opened with traditional rhythms, including a performance by Marie Gayéri in the Gulmantché musical tradition. The program also featured Fat Beauté, DJ Kedjevara, Magic System, Sam Fan Thomas, Zeynab Habib, Warren, Lokua Kanza, Nafissatou Diabaté, and Yodé & Siro. Local performers included Bonsa, Bélissa, Leekma-KDR, Sami Rama, and Abdoulaye Cissé.

Type	Category	Winner
Main Award	Kundé d'Or	Yoni
Main Award	Best Traditional Artist	Zougnazagmda
Main Award	Best Modern Religious Music Artist	Abbé Kima Roland
Main Award	Best Modern Song Inspired by Traditional Music	"Ziera Gnow" (Eugène Kounker)
Main Award	Most Played Artist in Nightclubs	Génération Partage
Main Award	Best Music Video	"La Traite" (K-Djoba)
Main Award	Revelation of the Year	K-Djoba
Main Award	Hope of the Year	Nama Jacky
Main Award	Best Female Artist	Amity Méria
Special Award	Best West African Artist	Magic System (Côte d'Ivoire)
Special Award	Best Central African Artist	Fally Ipupa (Democratic Republic of the Congo)
Kundé d'Honneur	Honorary Award	Sam Fan Thomas (Cameroon)
Kundé d'Honneur	Honorary Award	Aïcha Koné (Côte d'Ivoire)

=== 2009 ===
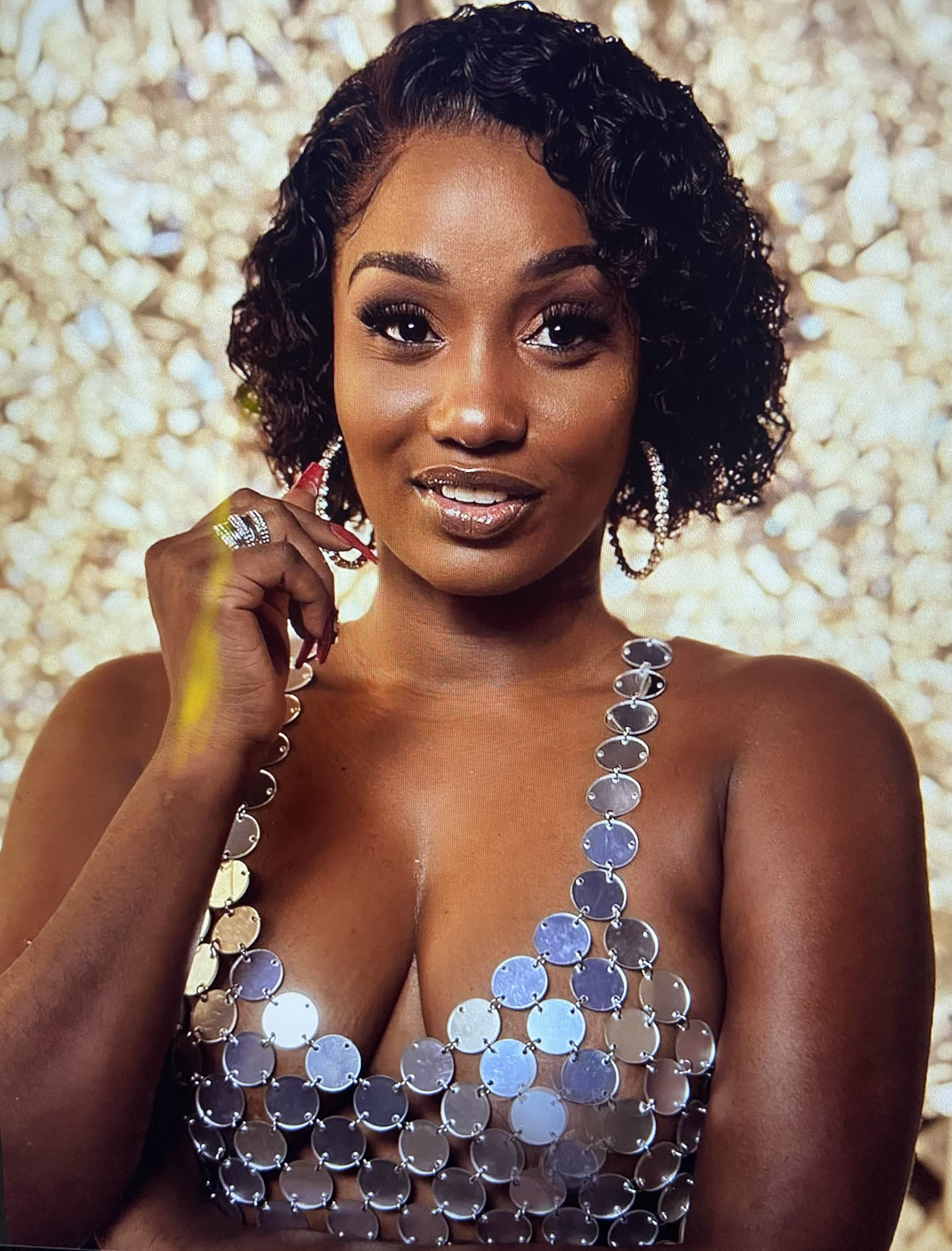
Fanny J took home the Best Caribbean Artist at the ninth edition

The ninth edition was held on 24 April at SIAO. Hamed Smani won the Kundé d'Or and the Public Prize with 57% of the vote, as well as the award for Most Played Artist in Nightclubs. Mys received two awards, Best Music Video and Best New Hope. Bonsa won the Kundé for Best Modern Song Inspired by Traditional Music, while Rovane won the Kundé for Best Female Artist.

Honorary Kundé awards were presented to Thomas Tiendrébéogo, Ernest Adjovi, Amadou Balaké, and Sam Mangwana. Tribute Kundé awards were presented posthumously to Affo Love of Benin, Miriam Makeba of South Africa, and Seydou Nignan of Burkina Faso. Chantal Compaoré was represented by Céline Yoda, Minister for the Advancement of Women.

Type	Categoty	Winner
Main Award	Kundé d'Or	Hamed Smani
Main Award	Best Traditional Artist	Kisto Koimbré
Main Award	Best Modern Religious Music Artist	Bationo Rose
Main Award	Best Modern Song Inspired by Traditional Music	"Kundé" (Bonsa)
Main Award	Most Played Artist in Nightclubs	Hamed Smani
Main Award	Best Music Video	"Je n'ai que ma voix" (Mys)
Main Award	Revelation of the Year	Duny Yaam
Main Award	Hope of the Year	Mys
Main Award	Best Female Artist	Rovane
Special Award	Best West African Artist	Yodé & Siro (Côte d'Ivoire)
Special Award	Best Caribbean Artist	Fanny J (French Guiana)
Kundé d'Hommage	Tribute Award	Miriam Makeba
Kundé d'Hommage	Tribute Award	Affo Love
Kundé d'Hommage	Tribute Award	Seydou Nignan
Kundé d'Honneur	Honorary Award	Thomas Tiendrébéogo
Kundé d'Honneur	Honorary Award	Ernest Adjovi
Kundé d'Honneur	Honorary Award	Sam Mangwana
Kundé d'Honneur	Honorary Award	Amadou Balaké

=== 2010 ===
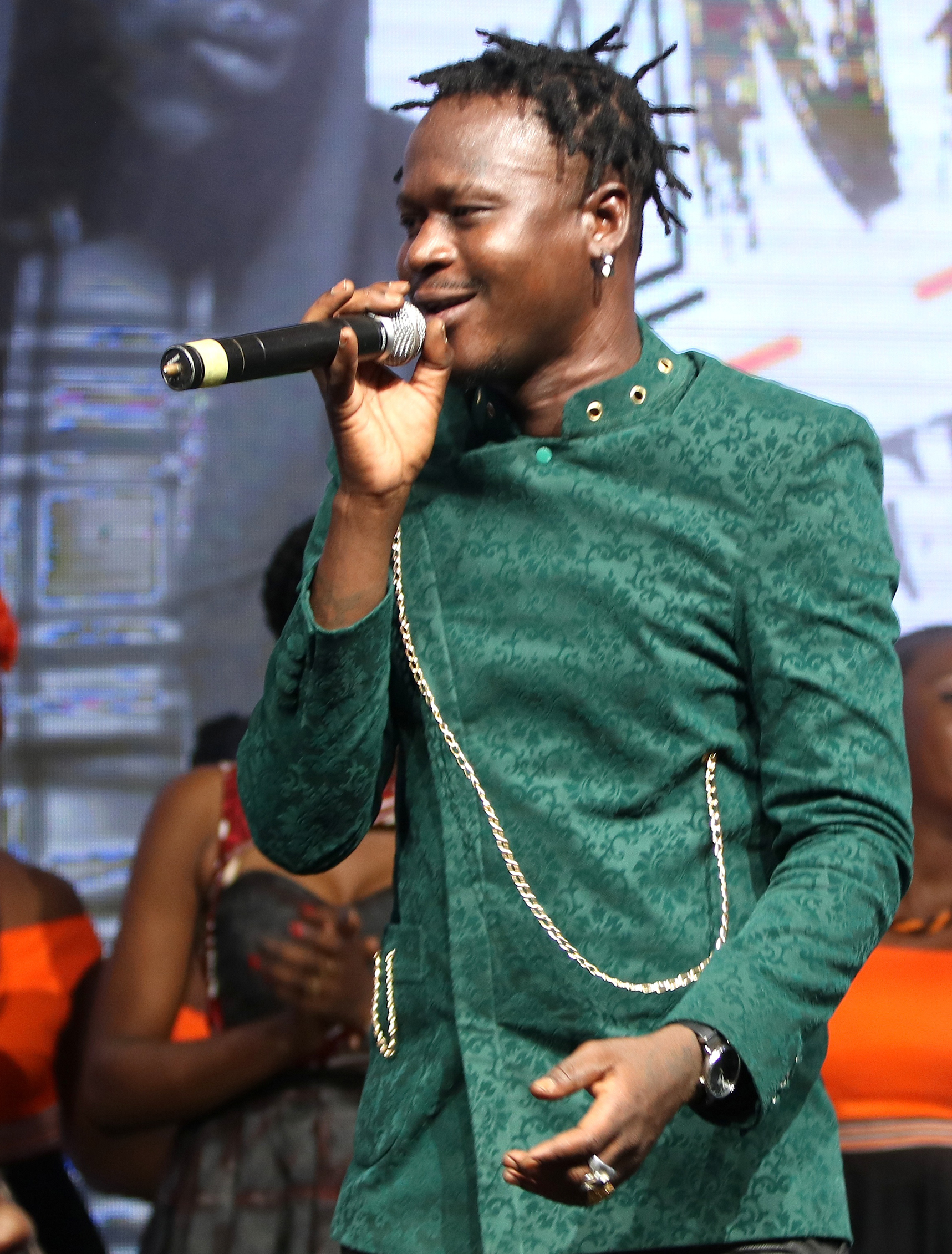
Floby took home the Kundé d'Or and Most Played Artist in Nightclubs at the tenth edition

The tenth edition, marking the Kundé's tenth anniversary, was held on 17 December 2010 at SIAO. It was initially scheduled for April but was postponed to 1 October because Burkina Faso was hosting the Kora Awards on 4 April. The ceremony was subsequently postponed again to 17 December. Jah Press explained that the Kundé and Kora Awards had similar purposes and said that the Kundé would return to its regular schedule the next year.

Type	Category	Winner
Main Award	Kundé d'Or	Floby
Main Award	Best Traditional Artist	Ismaïla Diarra
Main Award	Best Modern Religious Music Artist	Père Jean Nabollé
Main Award	Best Modern Song Inspired by Traditional Music	"Kampalyo" (Bil Aka Kora)
Main Award	Most Played Artist in Nightclubs	Floby
Main Award	Best Music Video	"Wend konté" (Alif Naaba)
Main Award	Revelation of the Year	Cisby et Eldji
Main Award	Hope of the Year	Wendy
Main Award	Best Female Artist	Wendy
Special Award	Best West African Artist	Toofan (Togo)
Special Award	Best Central African Artist	Extra Musica (Republic of the Congo)
Special Award	Best Caribbean Artist	Thierry Cham (Guadeloupe)

=== 2011 ===
Awa Sissao was named Best Female Artist at the 11th edition

The 11th edition was initially scheduled for 29 April 2011 but was postponed because of the situation in Burkina Faso at the time. The organizers also cited vandalism and looting affecting some of the Kundé's partners as a reason for the postponement. In September, the ceremony was rescheduled for 28 October 2011 at the Palais des Sports de Ouaga 2000, under the patronage of Chantal Compaoré.

Faso Kombat, comprising Ivorian artist Malk'hom and Burkinabè artist David, won the Kundé d'Or. The award carried a cash prize of 1.5 million CFA francs. The group also won the Most Played Artist in Nightclubs award for its song "Saly". Smockey won the Best Modern Song Inspired by Traditional Music award for "Fo Toum-da Yè", while Awa Sissao won Best Female Artist. Honorary awards were presented to the Congolese group Extra Musica, Antillean artist Éric Brouta, and Burkinabè artist Idrissa Ouédraogo. Performers included Werewere Liking, Sana Bob, Safoura Delta, and finalists from Faso Académie. Other invited artists included Moni Bilé, DJ Arafat, and Fally Ipupa.

Type	Category	Winner
Main Award	Kundé d'Or	Faso Kombat
Main Award	Best Traditional Artist	Kisto Koimbré
Main Award	Best Modern Religious Music Artist	Simon A. Kologo
Main Award	Best Modern Song Inspired by Traditional Music	"Fo Toumda Yè" (Smockey)
Main Award	Most Played Artist in Nightclubs	Faso Kombat
Main Award	Best Music Video	"You & Me for Life" (Playerz)
Main Award	Revelation of the Year	Keyt
Main Award	Hope of the Year	ATT
Main Award	Best Female Artist	Awa Sissao
Special Award	Best Burkinabè Artist in the Diaspora	Fulgence Compaoré
Special Award	Best West African Artist	DJ Arafat (Côte d'Ivoire)
Special Award	Best Central African Artist	Extra Musica (Republic of the Congo)
Special Award	Hope of the Year	Fally Ipupa
Special Award	Best African Group of the Decade	Extra Musica
Kundé d'Honneur	Honorary Award	Éric Brouta
Kundé d'Honneur	Honorary Award	Charles Ouédraogo
Kundé d'Honneur	Honorary Award	Prince Solo Bako
Kundé d'Honneur	Honorary Award	Abbé Robert Ouédraogo
Kundé d'Honneur	Honorary Award	Ouépia Korabié

=== 2012 ===
Patrick Kabré was named Hope of the Year at the 12th edition

The 12th edition was held on 27 April 2012 at the Palais des Sports de Ouaga 2000, with awards presented in 12 categories. The General Commissariat sought funding for the event and estimated the required budget at nearly 100 million CFA francs. Much of the funding remained unsecured because of a slow response from advertisers, prompting Jah Press, to appeal to traditional and potential partners for financial support.

Chantal Compaoré, who had served as patron of previous editions, did not attend the 2012 ceremony. The organizers attributed her absence to scheduling conflicts with the date of the event.

Type	Category	Winner
Main Award	Kundé d'Or	Eugène Kounker
Main Award	Best Traditional Artist	Gomtibo (Compaoré Yacouba)
Main Award	Best Religious Music Artist	Toussy
Main Award	Best Modern Song Inspired by Traditional Music	"Mariage forcé" (Kindiss)
Main Award	Most Played Artist in Nightclubs	Prince Zoetaba
Main Award	Best Music Video	"L'Afrique vous parle" (Don Sharp de Batoro)
Main Award	Revelation of the Year	David Solo
Main Award	Hope of the Year	Patrick Kabré
Main Award	Best Female Artist	Safoura Delta
Special Award	Best Burkinabè Artist in the Diaspora	Béranger Ouédraogo (USA)
Special Award	Best Foreign Artist Living in Burkina Faso	Rose Sabine (Côte d'Ivoire)
Special Award	Best West African Artist	S. Kelly (Côte d'Ivoire)
Special Award	Best Central African Artist	X Maleya (Cameroon)
Kundé d'Honneur	Honorary Award	Ismaël Lô (Senegal)
Kundé d'Honneur	Honorary Award	Kanda Bongo Man (Democratic Republic of the Congo)
Kundé d'Hommage	Tribute Award	Larlé Naaba Ambga
Kundé d'Hommage	Tribute Award	Georges Ouédraogo
Kundé d'Hommage	Tribute Award	Ado Léontine Gorgo

=== 2013 ===
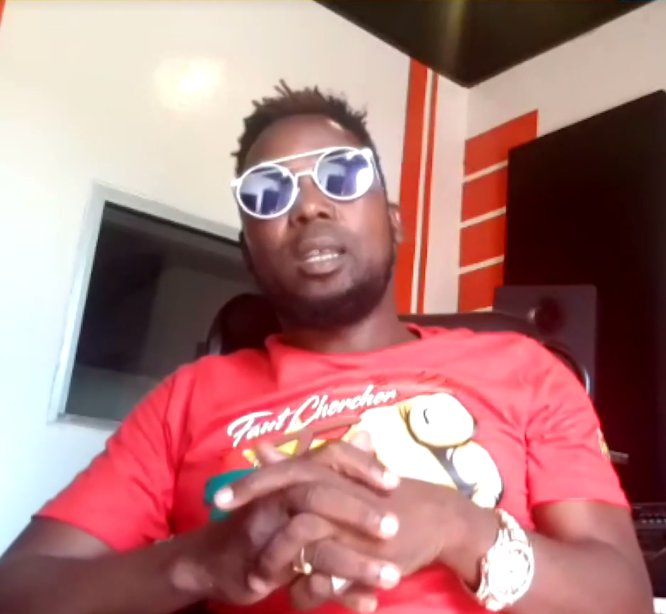
Dez Altino took home the Kundé d'Or and Most Played Artist in Nightclubs at the 13th edition

The 13th edition was held on 26 April 2013 at the Salle des Banquets de Ouaga 2000. Chantal Compaoré attended the ceremony, which included a gala dinner and choreographic performance by the Okama troupe, followed by a performance by Azéta Ouédraogo. Rovane performed material from her latest album Désir de femme. Other performers included JC Pluriel, Pierre Moutouari, Fuse ODG, Itz Tiffany, Arielle T., Greg Burkimbila, Faso Kombat, Adiouza, and Awa Boussim. Issouf Compaoré, who received an honorary Kundé, also appeared at the ceremony. Nigerian artist Flavour was unable to attend because of flight-related problems.

The Vlisco fashion show was presented by Clara Lawson, while the ceremony was hosted by Alpha O., Maguy Leslie Oka, and Yves Zogbo Junior. Tribute Kundé awards were presented posthumously to Thomas Tiendrébéogo, Jean Claude Bamogo, DJ Tifis, and Tonton Mimile.

Type	Category	Winner
Main Award	Kundé d'Or	Dez Altino
Main Award	Best Traditional Artist	Zougnazagmda
Main Award	Best Religious Music Artist	Séraphine Bancé
Main Award	Best Modern Song Inspired by Traditional Music	"M'da bagin panda" (Floby)
Main Award	Most Played Artist in Nightclubs	Dez Altino
Main Award	Best Music Video	"Le Chapeau du chef" (Smarty)
Main Award	Revelation of the Year	Greg Burkimbila
Main Award	Hope of the Year	Greg Burkimbila
Main Award	Best Female Artist	Nourat
Special Award	Best Burkinabè Artist in the Diaspora	Martin N'Terry (USA)
Special Award	Best Foreign Artist Living in Burkina Faso	DJ Jeff (Côte d'Ivoire)
Special Award	Best West African Artist	Flavour (Nigeria)
Special Award	Best Central African Artist	Arielle T (Gabon)
Special Award	Best Featuring	"Azonto" (Fuse ODG & Itz Tiffany)
Kundé d'Honneur	Honorary Award	Issouf Compaoré

=== 2014 ===
Alif Naaba took home the Kundé d'Or and Best Modern Song Inspired by Traditional Music at the 14th edition

The 14th edition was held on 25 April 2014 at the Salle des Banquets de Ouaga 2000. The ceremony was held as a dinner featuring musical performances and a fashion show. The jury was chaired by Damien Thiombiano, with the public also participating in the voting. Alif Naaba won the Kundé d'Or.

Performers included Zaïko Langa Langa, Meiway, Wyyz Boy, Amadou & Mariam, Serge Beynaud, Floby, Prince Édouard Ouédraogo, and Dez Altino. The ceremony was hosted by Yves Zogbo Junior, Maguy Oka Lesly, and Brice Anoh. The program also included a fashion show organized by Ivorian designer Giles Touré. The ceremony paid tribute to artists Rigobert Kaboré and Newman Bouba, who had died earlier that year.

Type	Category	Winner
Main Award	Kundé d'Or	Alif Naaba
Main Award	Best Traditional Artist	Bamogo de Nobéré
Main Award	Best Modern Religious Music Artist	Sœur Anne Marie Kaboré
Main Award	Best Modern Song Inspired by Traditional Music	Alif Naaba
Main Award	Most Played Artist in Nightclubs	Floby
Main Award	Best Music Video	Smarty
Main Award	Best Burkinabè Featuring of the Year	"Nonga" (Awa Nadia featuring Dicko Fils)
Main Award	Revelation of the Year	Fifou
Main Award	Hope of the Year	Wéto
Main Award	Best Female Artist	Rovane
Special/Public Award	Best Burkinabè Artist in the Diaspora	Humanist (France)
Special/Public Award	Best West African Artist	Serge Beynaud (Côte d'Ivoire)
Special/Public Award	Best Central African Artist	Werrason (Democratic Republic of the Congo)
Special/Public Award	Best African Integration Featuring	"Titi Nan" (Tiness La Déesse featuring Serge Beynaud)
Special/Public Award	Public Award	Bil Aka Kora
Kundé d'Honneur	Honorary Award	Zaïko Langa Langa
Kundé d'Hommage	Tribute Award	Rigobert Kaboré
Kundé d'Hommage	Tribute Award	Kondombo Boubacar

=== 2015 ===
Yemi Alade took home the Best West African Artist at the 15th edition

The 15th edition was held on 24 April 2015 at the Salle des Banquets de Ouaga 2000, during Burkina Faso's transitional period. The organizers estimated the budget at 100 million CFA francs and sought contributions from partners.

The opening performances included Don Sharp de Batoro, who presented the choreography "In the Footsteps of Peace", and the Burkinabè traditional troupe Naaba Yadega. Other performers included Burkinabè artists Aboulaye Cissé, David le Combattant, Awa Nadia, Duny Yaam, Leekma, the Floband, Oumou Sangaré, Yemi Alade, Mani Bella, Eddy Kenzo, Papou, and Josey.

Type	Category	Winner
Main Award	Kundé d'Or	Sana Bob
Main Award	Best Traditional Artist	Abibou Sawadogo
Main Award	Best Religious Music Artist	Toussy
Main Award	Best Modern Song Inspired by Traditional Music	"Denké denké" (Dicko Fils)
Main Award	Most Played Artist in Nightclubs	Floby
Main Award	Best Music Video	"Yaa Ya Boin" (Floby)
Main Award	Best Burkinabè Featuring	"Hawa" (Sissao feat. ATT)
Main Award	Revelation of the Year	Sofiano
Main Award	Hope of the Year	Sofiano
Main Award	Best Female Artist	Mariah Bissongo
Special Award	Best Foreign Artist Living in Burkina Faso	Weezy (Nigeria)
Special Award	Best Burkinabè Artist in the Diaspora	Bérenger Ouédraogo
Special Award	Best West African Artist	Yemi Alade (Nigeria)
Special Award	Best Central African Artist	Mani Bella (Cameroon)
Special Award	Best East African Artist	Eddy Kenzo (Uganda)
Special Award	Best African Integration Featuring	"Vivre ensemble" (Donsharp De Batoro feat. Soum Bill)
Public Award	Public Award	Dez Altino
Kundé d'Honneur	Honorary Award	Abdoulaye Cissé
Kundé d'Honneur	Honorary Award	Abdoulaye Cissé
Kundé d'Hommage	Tribute Award	Abdoulaye Yago
Kundé d'Hommage		Amadou Balaké

=== 2016 ===
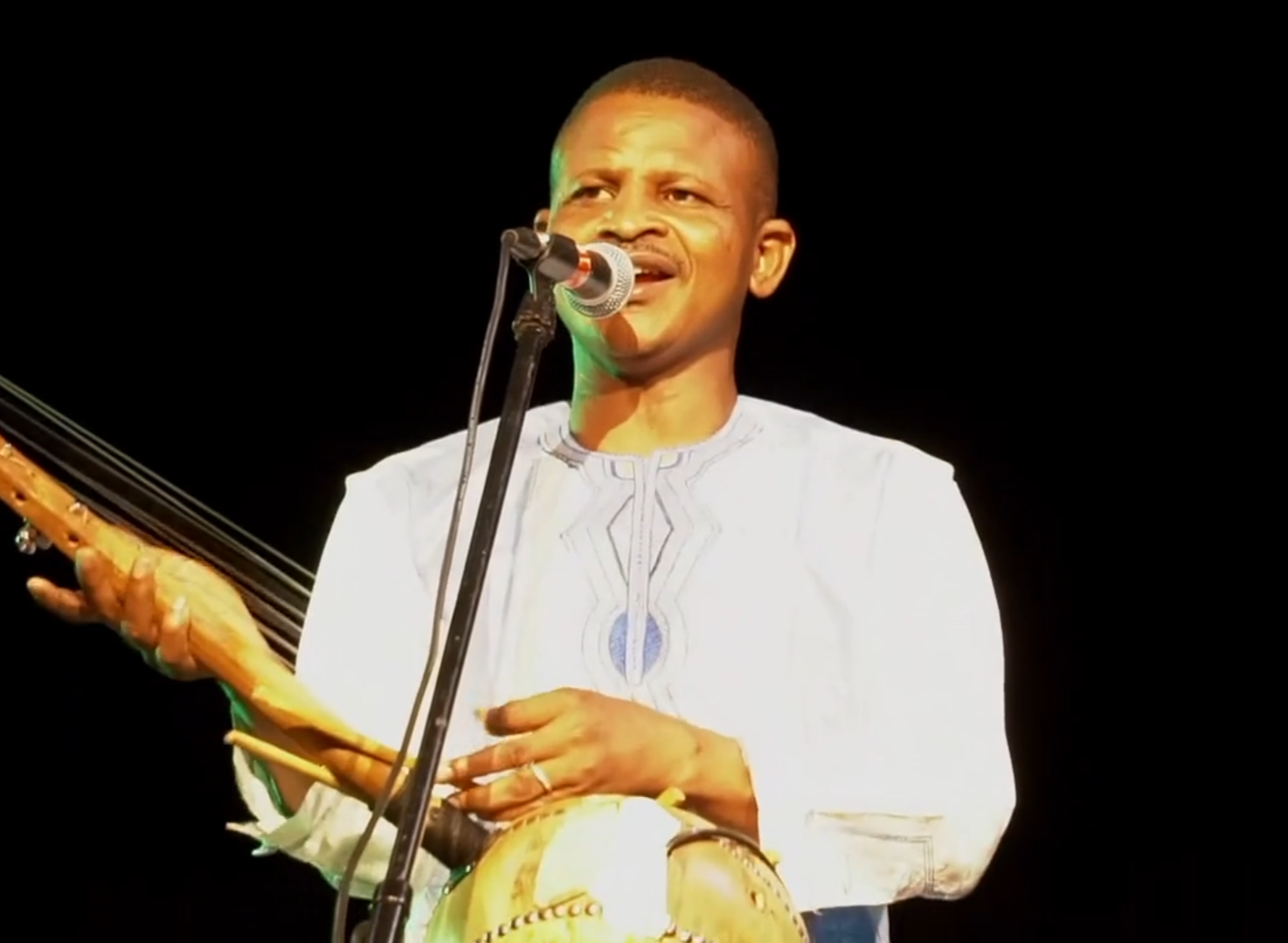
Dicko Fils received Kundé d'Or, Best Modern Song Inspired by Traditional Music, and Best Featuring of the Year during the 16th edition

The 16th edition was held on 29 April 2016 at the Salle des Banquets de Ouaga 2000. The budget, estimated at less than 130 million CFA francs, was not finalized, though the organizers said that their "regular partners" support the event. First Lady Sika Bella Kaboré served as patron of the ceremony. Papa Wemba, who died on 24 April 2016, shortly before the ceremony, was honored by the organizers, who highlighted his career and observed a minute of silence.

The program included musical performances, comedy, and a fashion show. Performers included Shado Chris, Josey, Koffi Olomidé, Marthe Zambo, Eunice Boula, Abibou Sawadogo, Awa Melone, Frère Malkhom, Agozo, Oualas, Dicko Fils, and Imilo Lechanceux.

Type	Category	Winner
Main Award	Kundé d'Or	Dicko Fils
Main Award	Best Traditional Artist	Zougnazagmda
Main Award	Best Modern Religious Music Artist	Rose Battiono
Main Award	Best Modern Song Inspired by Traditional Music	"Wakati" (Dicko Fils)
Main Award	Most Played Artist in Nightclubs	Floby
Main Award	Best Music Video	"Kami Maam" (Frère Malkom)
Main Award	Best Featuring of the Year	"Anani na" (Dicko Fils featuring Floby)
Main Award	Revelation of the Year	Malika Ouattara
Main Award	Hope of the Year	David le Combattant
Main Award	Best Female Artist	Wendy
Special Award	Best West African Artist	Josey (Côte d'Ivoire)
Special Award	Best Central African Artist	Franko (Cameroon)
Special Award	Best African Integration Featuring	"Voici l'Afrique" (Donsharp De Batoro feat. King Mensah)
Special Award	Best Foreign Artist Living in Burkina Faso	Mty (Côte d'Ivoire)
Special Award	Best Burkinabè Artist in the Diaspora	Bérenger Ouédraogo (USA)
Public Award	Public Award	Floby
Kundé d'Hommage	Tribute Award	Victor Démé
Kundé d'Hommage	Tribute Award	Papa Wemba
Kundé d'Honneur	Honorary Award	Marthe Zambo
Kundé d'Honneur	Honorary Award	Koffi Olomidé

=== 2017 ===
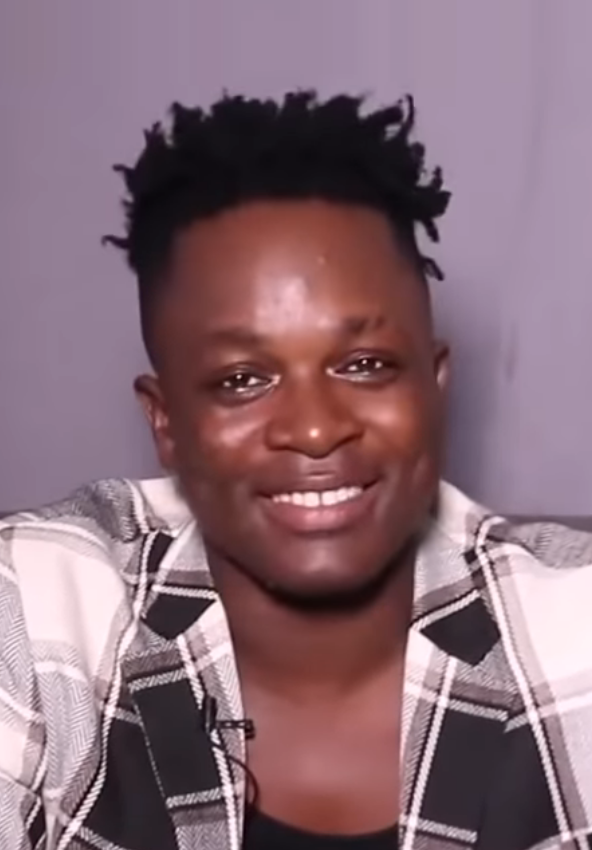
Imilo Lechanceux took home the Kundé d'Or and Best Music Video at the 17th edition

The 17th edition was held on 28 April 2017 at the Salle des Banquets de Ouaga 2000. The organizers estimated the budget at 150 million CFA francs, of which only one-third had been raised.

Performers included Zeynab Habib, Gadji Celi, Sidiki Diabaté, Floby, Awa Boussim, Revolution, DJ Mix, Prince Zoetaba, Mty, Don Jazzy, Tiwa Savage, Nyboma, and Korede Bello. Sika Bella Kaboré and Jah Press joined the dancing during Nyboma's performance. Burkinabè fashion designers, including Koro DK Style, presented a collective fashion show. The ceremony also paid tribute to model Doris Dabiré, who had died in a traffic accident a few weeks earlier.

Type	Category	Winner
Main Award	Kundé d'Or	Imilo Lechanceux
Main Award	Best Traditional Artist	Nana Bibata
Main Award	Best Religious Music Artist	Sœur Anne Marie Kaboré
Main Award	Best Modern Song Inspired by Traditional Music	"Laawol" (Dicko Fils)
Main Award	Most Played Artist in Nightclubs	Imilo Lechanceux
Main Award	Best Music Video	"Une minute au village" (Imilo Lechanceux)
Main Award	Revelation of the Year	Nabalüm
Main Award	Hope of the Year	Will B Black
Main Award	Best Burkinabè Featuring	"Bas ti gomin" (Pamika feat. Floby)
Main Award	Best Female Artist	Idak Bassavé
Special Award	Best Burkinabè Artist in the Diaspora	Bérenger Ouédraogo (USA)
Special Award	Best Foreign Artist Living in Burkina Faso	Barsa 1er (Côte d'Ivoire)
Special Award	Best West African Artist	Révolution (Côte d'Ivoire)
Special Award	Best Central African Artist	Reniss (Cameroon)
Special Award	Best African Integration Featuring	"On se connaît en détail" (Rose Sabine feat. Malika Ouattara)
Special Award	Best Musical Concept of the Year	Collectif Mavin
Public Award	Public Award	Dez Altino
Kundé d'Honneur	Honorary Award	Nyboma
Kundé d'Honneur	Honorary Award	Gadji Celi
Kundé d'Hommage	Tribute Award	Ablo Zon
Kundé d'Hommage	Tribute Award	Doris Dabiré

=== 2018 ===
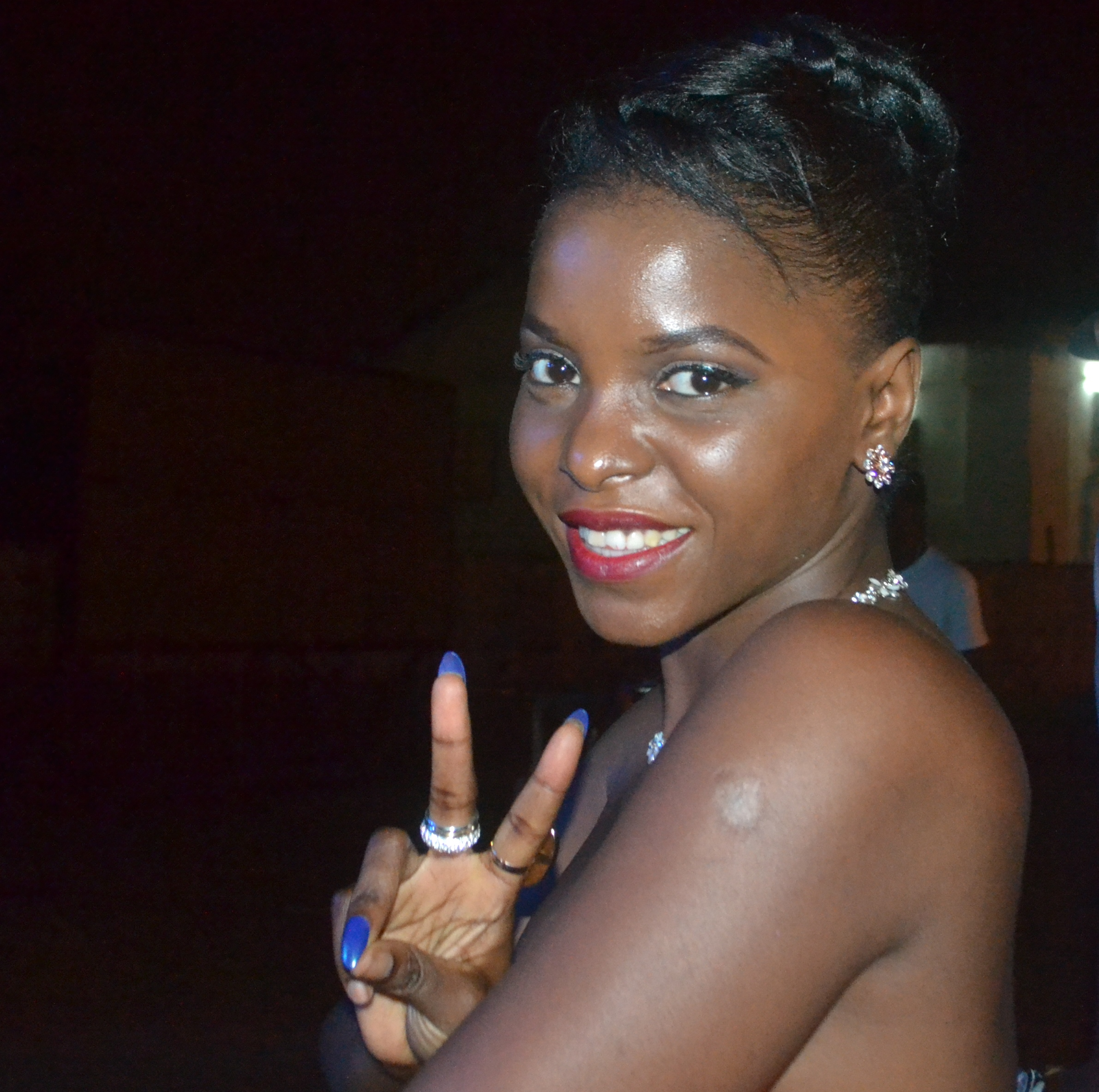
Daphne was named Best Central African Artist at the 18th edition

The 18th edition was held on 27 April 2018 at the Palais des Sports in Ouaga 2000. Hawa Boussim won the Kundé d'Or, ahead of Abibou Sawadogo and Don Sharp de Batoro. She also won Best Modern Traditional-Inspired Song, Best Female Artist, and Best Music Video. Abibou Sawadogo won the Public Award with 63.28% of the vote and the award for Best Traditional Artist.

The ceremony featured performances by African artists including Fally Ipupa, Charlotte Dipanda, Chidinma, Frost Olly, and Hiro.

Type	Category	Winner
Main Award	Kundé d'Or	Hawa Boussim
Main Award	Best Traditional Artist	Abibou Sawadogo
Main Award	Best Religious Music Artist	Adama Simon Kologo
Main Award	Best Modern Song Inspired by Traditional Music	"Korégoré" (Awa Boussim)
Main Award	Most Played Artist in Nightclubs	Imilo Lechanceux
Main Award	Best Music Video	"Korégoré" (Hawa Boussim)
Main Award	Revelation of the Year	Eunice Goula
Main Award	Hope of the Year	Eunice Goula
Main Award	Best Burkinabè Featuring	"Zida ne va plus au Zoo" (Askoy featuring Smarty)
Main Award	Best Female Artist	Hawa Boussim
Special Award	Best Burkinabè Artist in the Diaspora	Adèle Rouamba (France)
Special Award	Best Foreign Artist Living in Burkina Faso	Weezy (Nigeria)
Special Award	Best West African Artist	Sidiki Diabaté (Mali)
Special Award	Best Central African Artist	Daphné (Cameroon)
Special Award	Best African Integration Featuring	"La copine à mon ex" (Duden J featuring Malika Ouattara and Nash)
Public Award	Public Award	Abibou Sawadogo
Kundé d'Hommage	Tribute Award	Joseph Salambo
Kundé d'Honneur	Honorary Award	Biri Lingani
Kundé d'Honneur	Honorary Award — Young Male Talent of Central Africa	Hiro
Kundé d'Honneur	Honorary Award — Best Female Progression in West Africa	Charlotte Dipanda
Kundé d'Honneur	Honorary Award	Frost Olly
Kundé d'Honneur	Honorary Award — Lifetime Achievement	Nel Oliver
Kundé d'Honneur	Honorary Award — Best Female Artist in West Africa	Chidinma
Kundé d'Honneur	Honorary Award — Best Traditional-Inspired Song in Central Africa	Fally Ipupa
Kundé Special	Special Award for African Showbiz Professionals	Fally Ipupa
Kundé d'Honneur	Honorary Award	Magic System

=== 2019 ===
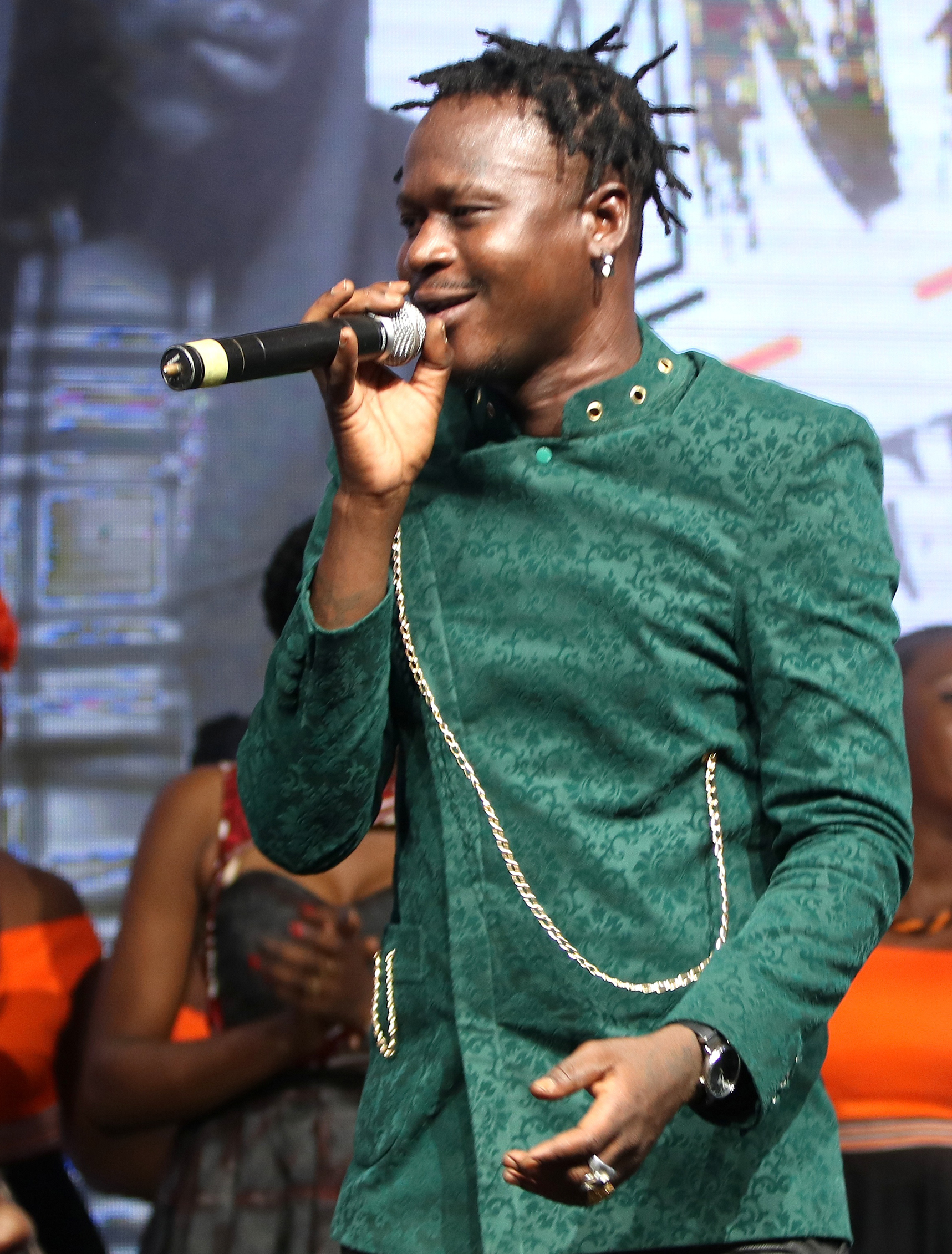
Floby took home the Kundé d'Or, Best Modern Song Inspired by Traditional Music, Most Played Artist in Nightclubs, and Public Award at the 19th edition

The 19th edition was held on 26 April 2019 at the Palais des Sports in Ouaga 2000. Sika Bella Kaboré served as patron of the ceremony and was represented by Clémentine Dabiré, the Prime Minister's wife. Performers included Marie Gayeri, To Finley, Kiri Kanta, Ami Koita, Freddy De Majunga, Extra Musica, Kiff No Beat, Rocky Gold, Magic Diezel, Bebi Philip, Big Solid, Limachel, and Yobo Constant Joël, known as Kerozen DJ.

The ceremony included speeches, a comedy performance by Philo, and a fashion show, followed by the presentation of the special and main-category awards. Floby won four awards: the Kundé d'Or, the Public Award, Most-Played Artist in Nightclubs, and Best Modern Song Inspired by Traditional Music for his song "Weedo". The prizes associated with his awards included an Air France Ouagadougou–Paris–Ouagadougou ticket, a weekend for two at Laïco Hotel in Ouaga 2000, 1.5 million CFA francs from the Kundé General Commission, one year of Internet access, and promotional items from Orange Burkina.

Type	Category	Winner
Main Award	Kundé d'Or	Floby
Main Award	Best Traditional Artist	Marie Gayeri
Main Award	Best Religious Music Artist	Nicole Kaboré
Main Award	Best Modern Song Inspired by Traditional Music	"Weedo" (Floby)
Main Award	Most Played Artist in Nightclubs	Floby
Main Award	Best Music Video	"Bangue Pinda" (Dez Altino)
Main Award	Revelation of the Year	Amzy
Main Award	Hope of the Year	Big Solid
Main Award	Best Burkinabè Featuring	"Ya Paalé" (Fush featuring Dez Altino)
Main Award	Best Female Artist	Malika Ouattara
Special Award	Best Burkinabè Artist in the Diaspora	IBK (France)
Special Award	Best Foreign Artist Living in Burkina Faso	Bibich Sérénité (Côte d'Ivoire)
Special Award	Best West African Artist	DJ Kerozen (Côte d'Ivoire)
Special Award	Best Central African Artist	Roga Roga (Republic of the Congo)
Special Award	Best African Integration Featuring	"N'nonga Fo" (Imilo Lechanceux feat. Chidinma)
Special Award	Best Francophone Afro-Rap Group	Kiff No Beat
Public Award	Public Award	Floby
Kundé d'Honneur	Honorary Award	To Finley
Kundé d'Honneur	Honorary Award	Ibrahima Sylla
Kundé d'Honneur	Honorary Award	Daniel Cuxac
Kundé d'Honneur	Honorary Award	Jean-Pierre Sarr
Kundé d'Honneur	Honorary Award	Moussa Joseph Ouédraogo
Kundé d'Honneur	Honorary Award	Koudbi Koala
Kundé d'Honneur	Honorary Award	Kiri Kanta
Kundé d'Honneur	Honorary Award	Freddy de Majunga
Kundé d'Honneur	Honorary Award	Amy Koita
Kundé d'Hommage	Tribute Award	Ibrahima Sylla
Kundé d'Hommage	Tribute Award	Jean-Pierre Sarr
Kundé d'Hommage	Tribute Award	Daniel Cuxac

=== 2021 ===
Kayawoto took home the Most Played Artist in Nightclubs and Revelation of the Year at the 20th edition

The 20th edition was held on 26 November 2021 at the Palais des Sports de Ouaga 2000 under the theme "Resistance and Resilience. Burkina Remains Standing!", to reflect the country's security situation. The ceremony was not held in 2020 because of the COVID-19 pandemic, and the 2021 event therefore became the 20th edition. Sika Bella Kaboré served as patron of the ceremony. The program included a dinner and a fashion show featuring designers Tina'O, Oum'C, and Koro DK Style. The jury, chaired by Kassoum David Koné, awarded the Kundé d'Or to Burkinabè artist Donsharp De Batoro. He also won Best Music Video for his song "Soundjata, le fils du buffle".

The edition introduced the After-Kundé, the Kundé Village, and artistic works dedicated to the Defense and Security Forces (FDS). The After-Kundé was a concert held on 27 November 2021 at the Palais des Sports de Ouaga 2000, featuring Burkinabè and international artists including Amity Méria, Smarty, Greg Burkimbila, Cheezy, Razben, Audrey Korsaga, Barack la Voix d'Or, Faden, Kayawoto, Kansy, Fush Alpha, Henri Dikongue, Thierry Cham, Général Défao, Extra Musica, Vegedream, Josey, Nomcebo Zikode, and Innoss'B.

The Kundé Village was held on the morning of 27 November on the grounds of the Palais des Sports and included entertainment, musical performances, and a maquis area.

Type	Category	Winner
Main Award	Kundé d'Or	Donsharp de Batoro
Main Award	Best Traditional Artist	Bamogo de Nobéré
Main Award	Best Religious Music Artist	Sœur Anne Marie Kaboré
Main Award	Best Modern Song Inspired by Traditional Music	"Zemstaaba" (Dez Altino)
Main Award	Most Played Artist in Nightclubs	Kayawoto
Main Award	Best Music Video	"Soundjata, le fils du buffle" (Donsharp de Batoro)
Main Award	Revelation of the Year	Kayawoto
Main Award	Hope of the Year	Fadeen
Main Award	Best Burkinabè Featuring	"Waloké" (Amzy featuring Greg Burkimbila)
Main Award	Best Female Artist	Miss Tanya
Special Award	Best Burkinabè Artist in the Diaspora	Jahkasa (France)
Special Award	Best Foreign Artist Living in Burkina Faso	Barsa 1er (Côte d'Ivoire)
Special Award	Best West African Artist	Josey (Côte d'Ivoire)
Special Award	Best Central African Artist	Innoss'B (Democratic Republic of the Congo)
Special Award	Best African Integration Featuring	"Barika" (Djéli Karim featuring Oumou Dioubaté)
Public Award	Public Award	Dez Altino
Kundé d'Honneur	Honorary Award	Zaksoba
Kundé d'Honneur	Honorary Award	Thierry Cham
Kundé d'Honneur	Honorary Award	Général Défao
Kundé d'Honneur	Honorary Award	Henri Dikongué
Kundé d'Hommage	Tribute Award	Jacob Desvarieux
Kundé d'Hommage	Tribute Award	Manu Dibango
Kundé d'Hommage	Tribute Award	Mory Kanté
Kundé d'Hommage	Tribute Award	François Tapsoba
Kundé d'Hommage	Tribute Award	Amobé Mévégué
Kundé d'Hommage	Tribute Award	Moustapha Thiombiano
Additional distinction	Most Popular French-Language Song	Vegedream
Additional distinction	Best Global Song	"Jerusalema" (Master KG featuring Nomcebo Zikode)
Additional distinction	Charismatic Leader Award	Roga Roga

=== 2023 ===
Smarty took home the Kundé d'Or and Best African Integration Featuring at the 21st edition

The 21st edition was held on 12 May 2023 at the Salle des Banquets de Ouaga 2000. The ceremony was broadcast live on Radio Télévision du Burkina and 3TV, as well as Mali's Africable. Smarty won the Kundé d'Or. Kundé d'honneur awards were presented by Jah Press to Jean Tapsoba (also known as Bouzouss), Madou Koné, Zao (born Casimir Zoba), and Nahawa Doumbia. Designer François 1er presented a collection of men's and women's garments made from Faso Danfani, a traditional Burkinabè cotton textile.

Performers included Didi B, Toofan, Krys M, Roseline Layo, Ks Blom, Nahawa Doumbia, Zao, Collectif Vent de Liberté, Nabalüm, Greg Burkimbila, Imilo Le Chanceux, Eunice Goula, Mara, and Sydir.

Type	Category	Winner
Main Award	Kundé d'Or	Smarty
Main Award	Best Traditional Artist	Abibou Sawadogo
Main Award	Best Religious Music Artist	Ella Nikiéma
Main Award	Best Modern Song Inspired by Traditional Music	"Wobr" (Doundosy)
Main Award	Most Played Artist in Nightclubs	Floby
Main Award	Best Music Video	"Le retour du brave" (Duden'J)
Main Award	Revelation of the Year	Elty
Main Award	Hope of the Year	Elty
Main Award	Best Burkinabè Featuring	"Sugar Daddy" (Miss Tanya featuring Floby)
Main Award	Best Female Artist	Miss Tanya
Special Award	Best Burkinabè Artist in the Diaspora	Kandy Guira (France)
Special Award	Best Foreign Artist Living in Burkina Faso	Yungkrate (Nigeria)
Special Award	Best West African Artist	Didi B (Côte d'Ivoire)
Special Award	Best Central African Artist	Krys M (Cameroon)
Special Award	Best African Integration Featuring	"Voyager" (Smarty featuring Magic System)
Public Award	Public Award	Miss Tanya
Kundé d'Honneur	Honorary Award	Madou Koné (Burkina Faso)
Kundé d'Honneur	Honorary Award	Jean Tapsoba "Bozous" (Burkina Faso)
Kundé d'Honneur	Honorary Award	Nahawa Doumbia (Mali)
Kundé d'Honneur	Honorary Award	Zao (Republic of the Congo)

=== 2024 ===
Amzy took home the Kundé d'Or and Best Burkinabè Featuring at the 22nd edition

The 22nd edition was held on 8 May 2024 at Salle des Banquets de Ouaga 2000. Amzy won the Kundé d'Or.

Type	Category	Winner
Main Award	Kundé d'Or	Amzy
Main Award	Best Traditional Artist	Adama Zongo
Main Award	Best Religious Music Artist	Ella Nikiéma
Main Award	Best Modern Song Inspired by Traditional Music	"Doni doni" (Djéli Karim)
Main Award	Most Played Artist in Nightclubs	DJ Domi
Main Award	Best Music Video	"Ba Yir" (Alif Naaba featuring Kayawoto)
Main Award	Revelation of the Year	DJ Domi
Main Award	Hope of the Year	Da Yeri
Main Award	Best Burkinabè Featuring	"Burkina" (Amzy featuring Awa Sissao)
Main Award	Best Female Artist	Nabalüm
Special Award	Best Burkinabè Artist in the Diaspora	Martin N'Terry (United States)
Special Award	Best Foreign Artist Living in Burkina Faso	Barsa 1er (Côte d'Ivoire)
Special Award	Best West African Artist	Tamsir featuring Team Paiya (Côte d'Ivoire)
Special Award	Best Central African Artist	Ferré Gola (Democratic Republic of the Congo)
Special Award	Best African Integration Featuring	"Bad Days" (Miss Tanya featuring Hiro)
Public Award	Public Award	Djéli Karim
Kundé d'Honneur	Honorary Award	Bakary Dembélé (Burkina Faso)
Kundé d'Honneur	Honorary Award	Denis Tshibayi (Democratic Republic of the Congo)
Kundé d'Honneur	Honorary Award	Boncana Maïga (Mali)

=== 2025 ===
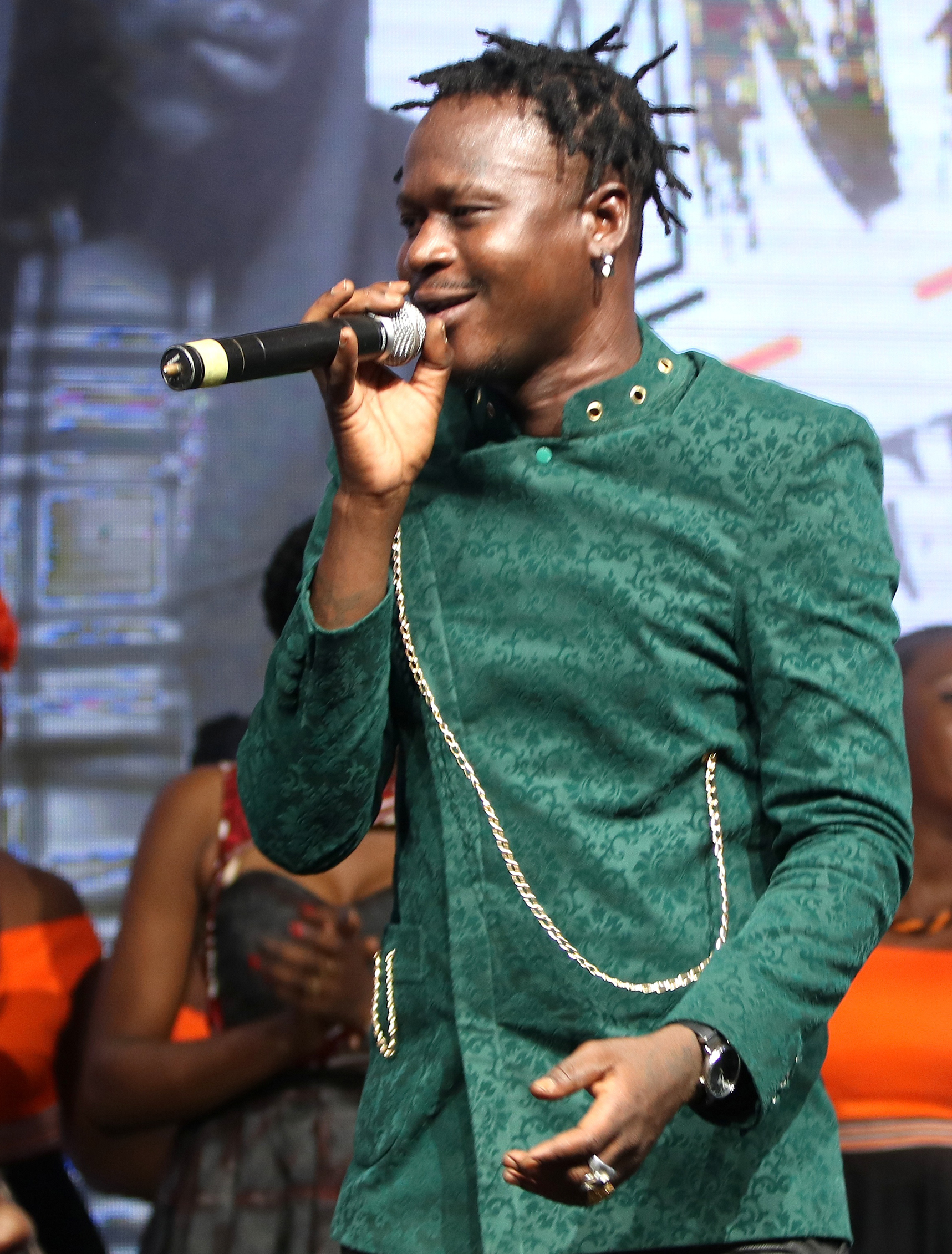
Floby took home the Kundé d'Or, Best Modern Song Inspired by Traditional Music, and Most Played Artist in Nightclubs at the 23rd edition

The 23rd edition was held on 25 April 2025 at the Salle des Banquets de Ouaga 2000. Floby won the Kundé d'Or, Best Modern Song Inspired by Traditional Music, and Most-Played Artist in Nightclubs. Miss Tanya won the Public Award, Best Female Artist, and Best Music Video for her song "Pananki". Kayawoto won Best Burkinabè Collaboration for "Commando", featuring Privat. Ivorian rapper Himra won Best West African Artist, while Mister Koff, an Ivorian artist based in Burkina Faso, won Best Foreign Artist Living in Burkina Faso.

An Honorary Kundé was presented to the Ivorian group Espoir 2000 in recognition of its career. Pat Sacko dedicated the award to his partner Valéry, who had died the previous year, and performed a medley of songs by the group. The ceremony also honors Zedess, Makoma, Zitany Neil, Oumou Dioubaté, and Roger Wango. The program included performances by Cameroonian singer Mimie and the Orange collective, as well as a fashion show by Tuhora.

Type	Category	Winner
Main Award	Kundé d'Or	Floby
Main Award	Best Traditional Artist	Salif Widga
Main Award	Best Religious Music Artist	Sœur Anne Marie Kaboré
Main Award	Best Modern Song Inspired by Traditional Music	"Ouaga zeune" (Floby)
Main Award	Most Played Artist in Nightclubs	Floby
Main Award	Best Music Video	"Pananki" (Miss Tanya)
Main Award	Revelation of the Year	Francky Fp
Main Award	Hope of the Year	Kid Boss
Main Award	Best Burkinabè Featuring	"Commando" (Kayawoto featuring Privat)
Main Award	Best Female Artist	Miss Tanya
Special Award	Best Burkinabè Artist in the Diaspora	Kandy Guira (France)
Special Award	Best Foreign Artist Living in Burkina Faso	Mister Koff (Côte d'Ivoire)
Special Award	Best West African Artist	Himra (Côte d'Ivoire)
Special Award	Best Central African Artist	Bad Nova (Cameroon)
Special Award	Best African Integration Featuring	"Ne parle pas" (Smarty featuring Korka Dieng)
Public Award	Public Award	Miss Tanya
Kundé d'Honneur	Honorary Award	Boureima Djiga
Kundé d'Honneur	Honorary Award	Roger Wango
Kundé d'Honneur	Honorary Award	Oumou Dioubaté
Kundé d'Honneur	Honorary Award	Zitany Neil
Kundé d'Honneur	Honorary Award	Makoma
Kundé d'Honneur	Honorary Award	Espoir 2000

=== 2026 ===
Miss Tanya took home the Kundé d'Or, Best Modern Song Inspired by Traditional Music, Best Music Video, Best Burkinabè Featuring, and Best Female Artist at the 24th edition

The 24th edition was held on 8 May 2026 at the Salle des Banquets de Ouaga 2000. Miss Tanya won five awards, including the Kundé d'Or, setting a record for the most awards won by an artist in a single edition. Reman received the Public Award. Honorary awards were presented to Grace Decca, Awilo Longomba, and Éric Virgal. Posthumous awards were presented to Alino Faso and Boncana Maïga.

Type	Category	Winner
Main Award	Kundé d'Or	Miss Tanya
Main Award	Best Traditional Artist	Marie Gayeri
Main Award	Best Religious Music Artist	Sœur Inès Nadine Kantiono
Main Award	Best Modern Song Inspired by Traditional Music	"Rakiré" (Miss Tanya featuring Zougnazagmda and Nana Bibata)
Main Award	Most Played Artist in Nightclubs	Reman
Main Award	Best Music Video	"Rakiré" (Miss Tanya featuring Zougnazagmda and Nana Bibata)
Main Award	Revelation of the Year	Mas B
Main Award	Hope of the Year	Hakhwa
Main Award	Best Burkinabè Featuring	"Rakiré" (Miss Tanya featuring Zougnazagmda and Nana Bibata)
Main Award	Best Female Artist	Miss Tanya
Special Award	Best Burkinabè Artist in the Diaspora	Cheezy (France)
Special Award	Best Foreign Artist Living in Burkina Faso	Déodat C (Benin)
Special Award	Best West African Artist	Roseline Layo (Côte d'Ivoire)
Special Award	Best Central African Artist	Kocee (Cameroon)
Special Award	Best African Integration Featuring	"Qui t'a dit ?" (Young Ced featuring Toofan)
Public Award	Public Award	Reman
Kundé d'Honneur	Honorary Award	Ahmed Alex Lawal Koanda
Kundé d'Honneur	Honorary Award	Claude Bassolé
Kundé d'Honneur	Honorary Award	Éric Virgal
Kundé d'Honneur	Honorary Award	Awilo Longomba
Kundé d'Honneur	Honorary Award	Angèle Assélé
Kundé d'Hommage	Tribute Award	Boncana Maïga
Kundé d'Hommage	Tribute Award	Consty Eka
Kundé d'Hommage	Tribute Award	Alino Faso
