= Music of Burkina Faso =

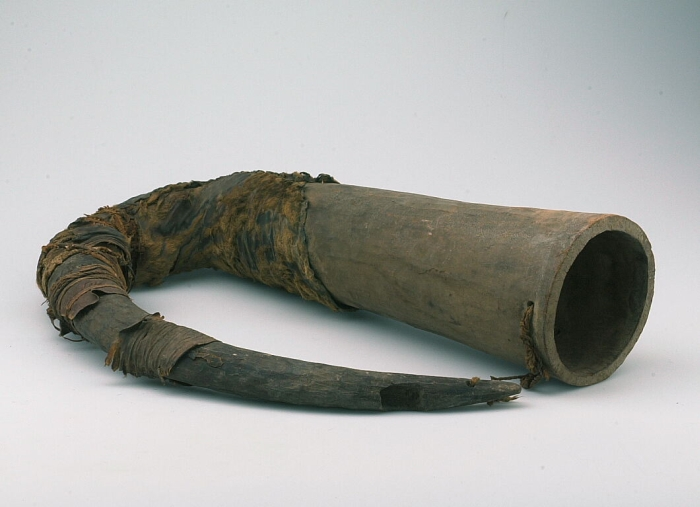
Wooden horn of the Samo people

The music of Burkina Faso includes the folk music of 60 different ethnic groups. The Mossi people, centrally located around the capital, Ouagadougou, account for 40% of the population while, to the south, Gurunsi, Gurma, Dagaaba and Lobi populations, speaking Gur languages closely related to the Mossi language, extend into the coastal states. In the north and east the Fulani of the Sahel preponderate, while in the south and west the Mande languages are common; Samo, Bissa, Bobo, Senufo and Marka. Burkinabé traditional music has continued to thrive and musical output remains quite diverse. Popular music is mostly in French: Burkina Faso has yet to produce a major pan-African success.

== Popular music ==
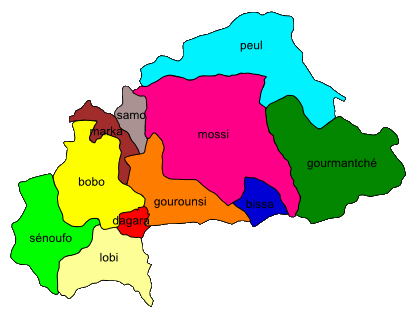
Main language regions of Burkina Faso

Burkina Faso's popular music scene has not yet garnered the fame of that of other West African countries, and many popular recordings are imported from Europe, the United States and Democratic Republic of the Congo. In spite of this influx of popular styles, a few early musical acts achieved success such as Koudbi Koala's group Saaba, who perform traditional Mossi music from the region around Ouagadougou, the nation's capital. With a musical career that lasted half a century, singer Amadou Balaké was one of the foremost singers from the country during the 20th century. In his music, Balaké combined Mandé, Mossi, and Afro-Cuban traditions. Other influential artists from the country include George Ouédraogo and Joseph Moussa Salambéré "Salambo".

Popular traditional groups from Burkina Faso include balafon bands, percussion ensembles and others such as Farafina and Gabin Dabiré, who uses elements of traditional Burkinabé music. Bobo Dioulasso, Burkina Faso's second-largest city, is a cultural centre of Burkina Faso's Mandé people of the southwest. Burkinabe artist Barack La Voix D'or is a contemporary artist blending traditional Mande styles with modern afrobeat.

More recently, modern musicians in Burkina Faso are beginning to incorporate more foreign influences into their music, especially those from the United States, with genres such as hip-hop, rap, salsa and techno entering the music scene. The zouglou genre from Côte d'Ivoire, along with its originator zouk, are also popular modern genres in Burkina Faso.

Another modern genre that entered Burkina Faso is the Ivorian coupé-décalé, characterised by its electronic dance beat and percussive rhythm. Modern popular artists in Burkina Faso that have utilised this genre include Floby, Dez Altino, Dicko Fils, Imilo Lechanceux, Kayawoto, Huguo Boss, Razben, Barsa 1er, Agozo, Bebeto Bongo, Greg Burkimbila, David Le Combattant and Sofiano.

== Traditional music ==
The kora, the stringed instrument of the djeli, has been popular throughout much of West Africa since the Malian empire of the 1240s. The instrument traditionally featured seven strings until the Gambian griot Madi Woulendi increased that number to twenty-one. The kora can be played in several scales including the hypolydian mode (saouta), silaba, sim'bi and mandéka.

Mande-speakers are also known for the balafon, a kind of wooden xylophone, the exact characteristics of which can vary depending on the maker. The Dagara, Bwa and Senufo peoples also have their own varieties.

Djembe drums, like balafons, are often manufactured in Bobo Dioulasso. The djembe, a vital part of Burkinabé traditional music, is said to be of Malinké origin. It is made from a single piece of wood, usually from a caïlcedrat or lenke tree.

The bendré drum (called bara in Mali and dumaa among the Hausa) is a membranophone made from a gourd with the top cut off and covered with goat or sheep skin. It is an ancient instrument, probably introduced during the reign of Naaba Oubri to be played in sacred music at the royal courts of Moaga by a head drummer (benaaba) who strikes the center or edges of the drum to make varying sounds.

Another stringed instrument is called the n'goni. Legend says it was invented by a Senufo hunter. The n'goni is also played in Niger, Senegal and Mali.

The Fula people (Fulbe) of the north play a variety of traditional instruments including drums, hoddu (or xalam, a plucked skin-covered lute related to the banjo) and the riti or riiti (a one-string bowed instrument), and use complex vocal techniques with clapping percussion. Their griots are known as gawlo.

== See also ==
- Presidential Band of Burkina Faso
