= Imilo Lechanceux =

Ivorian-Burkinabé singer, dancer and DJ

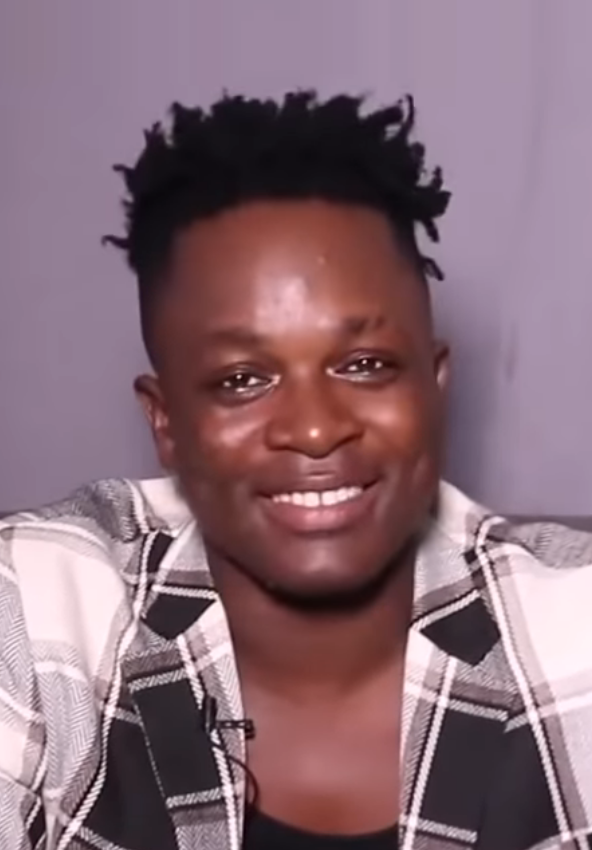
- Lechanceux in 2019

Background information
- Born: Émile Ilboudo; 20 September 1988 (age 38); Tiassalé, Ivory Coast
- Genres: Afrobeat; coupé-décalé; reggae; rumba
- Occupations: Singer; dancer; DJ
- Years active: 2005–present

Émile Ilboudo (born 20 September 1988), better known by his stage name Imilo Lechanceux, is an Ivorian-Burkinabé singer, dancer and DJ. He sings in French, Mòoré and Dyula. Lechanceux's music generally falls under the coupé-décalé and afrobeat genres, and he also occasionally raps on his songs. He has toured in West Africa, Europe, Canada and the United States. Lechanceux is sometimes known by his nickname on songs, Le Fils du Pays ("The Son of the Country").

== Life and career ==
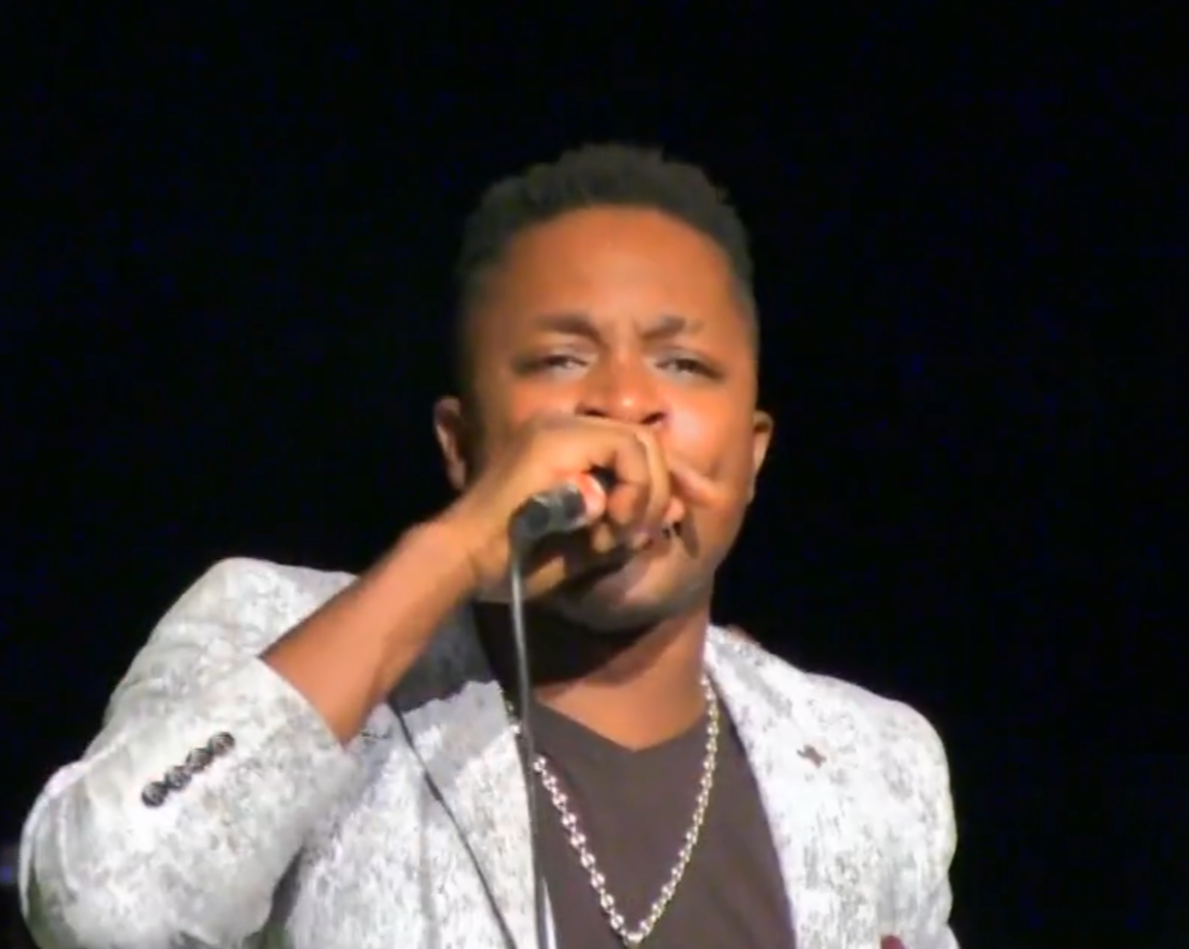
Lechanceux performing in Montréal, Canada in 2017

Émile Ilboudo was born on 20 September 1988 in Tiassalé, Ivory Coast, the seventh of eight children of retired driver Johany Ilboudo and housewife Bernadette Zoungrana, both from Burkina Faso. During his childhood, he did dance and theatre as a hobby. In 2004, at age 16, he moved to Tanghin-Dassouri, a village near Ouagadougou, Burkina Faso, where he continued his dancing alongside school. At this time, he joined the Atelier-Théâtre Burkinabé (ATB) theatre group.

Ilboudo started DJing in 2005 under the name DJ Imilo. His parents could no longer afford to pay for his education, and he eventually started performing for small maquis (bars) and later performed small shows. Taking part in several DJing competitions, he was eventually recruited into the group Les Villageois ("The Villagers") with three other DJs, Baby, Tabaly and Zino, following a competition in 2009. Ilboudo saved up money to rent a recording studio to record his own single, "Mot de Pass" ("Password"), produced by Serge Beynaud. His brother loaned him 250,000 CFA francs to record the music video. Lechanceux sent out his single to promoters and managers, but initially none took interest. However, the song gained large exposure following its broadcast during the half-time of a quarter-final match at the 2010 Africa Cup of Nations. Lechanceux subsequently received many calls from the same promoters and managers who'd turned him away. His solo career began in 2010–2011, which is when he took the name Imilo Lechanceux.

Following the death of Ivorian musician DJ Arafat on 12 August 2019, Lechanceux gave a commemoration at his funeral.

Lechanceux has performed at festivals alongside artists including Floby, Dez Altino and Hawa Boussim and has worked with Ivorian producers Bebi Philip and Serge Beynaud.

== Awards ==
Lechanceux won awards at the Cool Oneline Awards 2015 and the 2015 Faso Musique Awards. He won the Golden Kundé and two other Kundé awards in 2017.

== Discography ==
=== Albums ===
- En Voici 1 ("Here is 1") (produced by Serge Beynaud) (2013)
- Dieu est ma Force ("God is my Strength") (2015)
- Elevation (2017)

=== Singles ===
- "Soutiens les Étalons" ("Support the Talons") (2015)
- "Wassa Wassa" ("Done Quickly, Done Well" in Dyula) (produced by Bebi Philip) (2015)
- "Talaba" (produced by Bebi Philip) (2015)
- "Attrapez Attrapez" ("Catch Catch") (2016)
- "Qui a Dit" ("Who Said") (featuring Revolution) (2016)
- "Une Minute au Village" ("One Minute in the Village") (2017)
- "Warb Nooma" (2017)
- "On Aime Ça" ("We Like That") (2017)
- "Elle Me Rend Dingue" ("She Drives Me Crazy") (2018)
- "Soukini" (2018)
- "M'Nonga Fo" ("I Love You" in Mòore) (featuring Chidinma) (2019)
- "Pintinclin" (featuring Safarel Obiang) (2019)
- "Attegban" (featuring Sidiki Diabate) (2021)
