= Bil Aka Kora =

- Also known as: Bil Aka Kora
- Born: Bilgho Akaramata Kora; April 25, 1971 (age 55)
- Origin: Pô, Burkina Faso
- Genre: Djongo
- Instruments: Guitar, Drums

Bilgho Akaramata Kora, also known as Bil Aka Kora (born April 25, 1971, Pô, Burkina Faso) is a Burkinabé musician. He was one of the 17 children of Mahama and Teoura Bilgho. He is married to Astride, and is the father of Korane Prisca. Bil Aka Kora's sound draws upon traditional music from the language, instruments, rhythm and themes of the south of Burkina Faso.

== Early life ==
While in high school, Kora joined a band called "les Missiles" where learned to play the guitar under the instruction of a Ghanaian called Salah Ben. Bil Aka Kora went to university to study math and physics, but was forced to drop out after his second year because he had neither the funds nor a scholarship to continue his studies. He then turned to music to earn a living. He began playing full-time in bars and nightclubs. In 1997, the Cultural Minister of Burkina Faso, Mahamoudou Ouedraogo, initiated "Les Grands Prix Nationaux de la Musique" (National Grand Prizes of Music), which is a national competition for Burkinabé musicians. Winning the first place at this competition with another musician, Kanzai, encouraged Bil Aka Kora to keep developing his musical talent.

== Career ==
Bil Aka Kora was seen playing live on the TV shows La Nuit du Communicateur (Communicator's Night) and Prix Galian (Galian Prize). He recorded his first album, Douatou, in December 1998.

He was the musical director of several film documentaries and movies soundtracks during the 18th edition of FESPACO. In 2004, he played the role of the musician in the movie Sofia from director Aboubacar Diallo, and composed the movie soundtrack.

Kora owns a production studio called Djongo Diffusion. Bil Aka Kora declares that his purpose with the studio is to help young people who want to become musicians, even if they are not performing Djongo music.

== Special musical style ==
Bil Aka Kora's version of Djongo is a fusion of Kassena and modern musical styles such as jazz, reggae, and blues. Djongo was originally the traditional music of the Gourounsi or Kassena (ethnic groups in the south of Burkina Faso), produced with a lot percussion instruments such as bendre, lunga, djembe, drums and flutes. Djongo is traditionally a dance of rivalry, vitality, strength and energy that Kassena men dance to impress and seduce girls or before going to war. Kora modernized Djongo and made it into a musical style appreciated throughout Burkina Faso, even though the lyrics are in Kassena, a language spoken by only 1% of the population.

== Global tours ==
Bil Aka Kora has traveled to Belgium, France, Italy and Canada as well as many African countries like Togo and Benin. Travelling has enabled him to meet and exchange with others artists, like the Austrian musician Hubert von Goisern and the Canadian mixer Gerald La Roche.

== Nominations and achievements ==
- He has won the Gold Kunde twice in 2000 and 2005.
- His video "Dibayagui" was selected the most beautiful in 2005 by the Burkinabe for the TV show, Clip d'or.

Kora says he owes his musical success to the support of his wife Astride, and his group, the Djongo System.

== Discography ==
Bil Aka Kora recorded three albums. Most of his music has themes of social issues. His first album, Douatou ("Rain Maker") (1999), talks about the rain, a metaphor for the political issues of Burkina Faso. In his song "Wematou" ("God is My Father") he explains how society criticizes single moms and their children, but takes no fault with single dads and their children.

His second album, Ambolou ("What is Worthy for Me" ) (2001), has been called an album of maturity.

His most recent album is Dibayagui (2004). In this album, the song "Dibayagui" is for the Kassena warriors.

== Future plans ==
Kora hopes to become more famous both in Africa and internationally. He hopes to win the KORA, a musical festival in South Africa. The KORA rewards talented African and African Diaspora musicians.
