= Bétika =

Ivorian actor

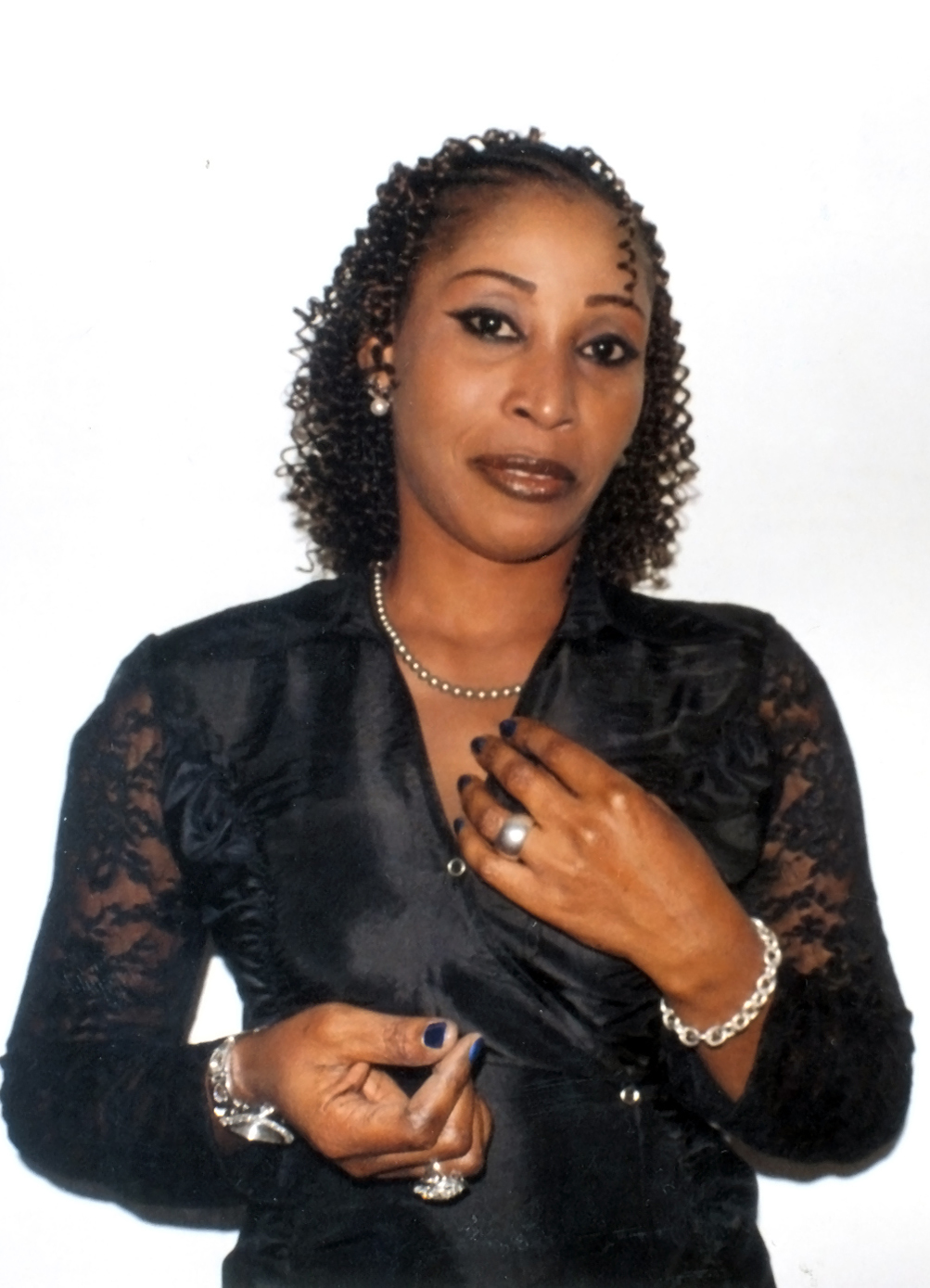
- Born: Brigitte Houedji; Grand-Bassam, Ivory Coast
- Citizenship: Ivory Coast
- Occupations: singer and actor

Bétika (born Brigitte Houedji, Grand-Bassam, Ivory Coast) is a singer and actor from Ivory Coast.

== Career ==
Born in the former French colonial capital city of Grand-Bassam, east of the capital Abidjan, Houedji was a finalist in "Le Famesol", held in Grand-Bassam in 1987. With her interest and skills in music, she played and traveled with the ensembles of François Lougah and Antoinette Konan successively. In 1996, Bétika released her first album, "Ma Vie" ("My Life" in English). In 2000, she released her second album, Millenium 2000 Ah les Hommes!. In 2005 she released her third album, Missié Pardon (Fakaloh). Through her compositions, Bétika advocates fraternal love and love between married couples. Her music themes also cover love between humans in general. By recognition, Ivorian music fans have named her "L’avocate de l’Amour" ("The Advocate of Love").

In 2006, Bétika won three trophies, including the "Georges Taï Benson" award at the Ivorian Music Awards. She was also named best female artist at the ceremony for her song "Fakaloh".
