= Issouf Compaoré =

Burkinabé footballer

Personal information
- Date of birth: April 12, 1988 (age 38)
- Place of birth: Agnibilékrou, Côte d'Ivoire
- Position: Defender

Senior career*
Years	Team	Apps	(Gls)
2006–2008	ASC Ouragahio		
2008–2009	Fruškogorac		
2009–2014	Banat Zrenjanin	19	(1)

International career^{‡}
2008–	Burkina Faso	2	(0)
- * Club domestic league appearances and goals as of 6 January 2011 ‡ National team caps and goals as of 6 January 2011

Issouf Compaoré (born 12 April 1988) is a Burkinabé international football defender.

== Career ==
Formed at l'Ecole de Formation Yeo Martial (EFYM) in Côte d'Ivoire he played with Ivorian ASC Ouragahio. He had trials with Olympique de Marseille and short spells with R.E. Virton and FC Metz before moving to Serbia in 2008 where after playing initially one season with lower leagues club FK Fruškogorac he signed with FK Banat Zrenjanin.

He preferably plays as left-back although he can also play as left-winger.

Despite being born in Côte d'Ivoire (Ivory Coast) and having made part of the Côte d'Ivoire cadetes national team, he has chousen to represent Burkina Faso national team since 2008.
