= Dez Altino =

Burkinabé singer and guitarist

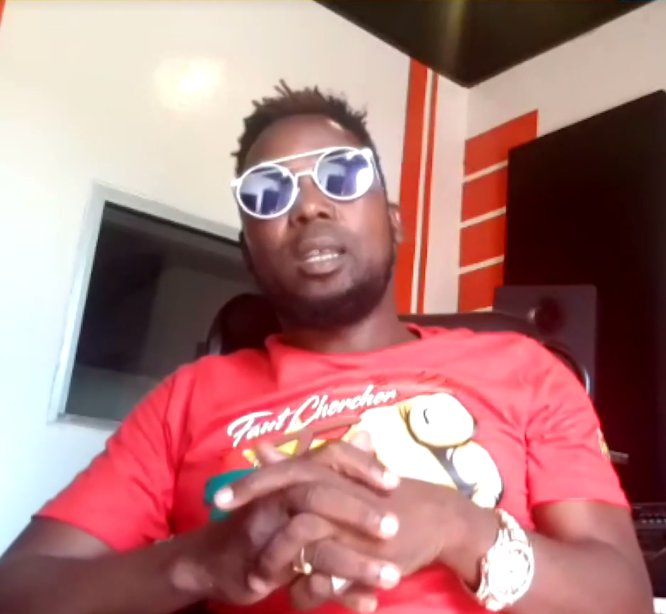
- Altino in 2020

Background information
- Born: Tiga Wendwaoga Désiré Ouédraogo; Burkina Faso
- Genre: Coupé-décalé
- Occupations: Singer; guitarist
- Years active: 2006–present
- Website: www.dezaltinobf.com

Tiga Wendwaoga Désiré Ouédraogo, better known by his stage name Dez Altino, is a Burkinabe singer and guitarist. He sings in the Mòoré and French languages, and most of his music falls under the coupé-décalé genre. He has collaborated on numerous occasions with other high-profile Burkinabé artists such as Floby and Agozo.

Altino is also known by his nickname, Le Prince National.

== Life and career ==
Altino first entered music in 2006 with his album Bon Dieu. In 2018, he set up the production company Altino Prod to support young artists in the development of their careers.

He lives in the Cissin district of Ouagadougou and has a daughter, born in 2012.

== Honours and awards ==
Altino won the Golden Kundé in 2013 as well as various other Kundé awards in 2013, 2014 and 2017. He has also been made a Knight of the Order of Merit of Burkina Faso.

== Discography ==
=== Albums ===
- Bon Dieu ("Good God") (2006)
- Sabaabo (2014)
- Barka ("Thanks") (2016)
- Beogo ("Future") (2019)
