= Roseline Layo =

Ivorian singer (born 1993)

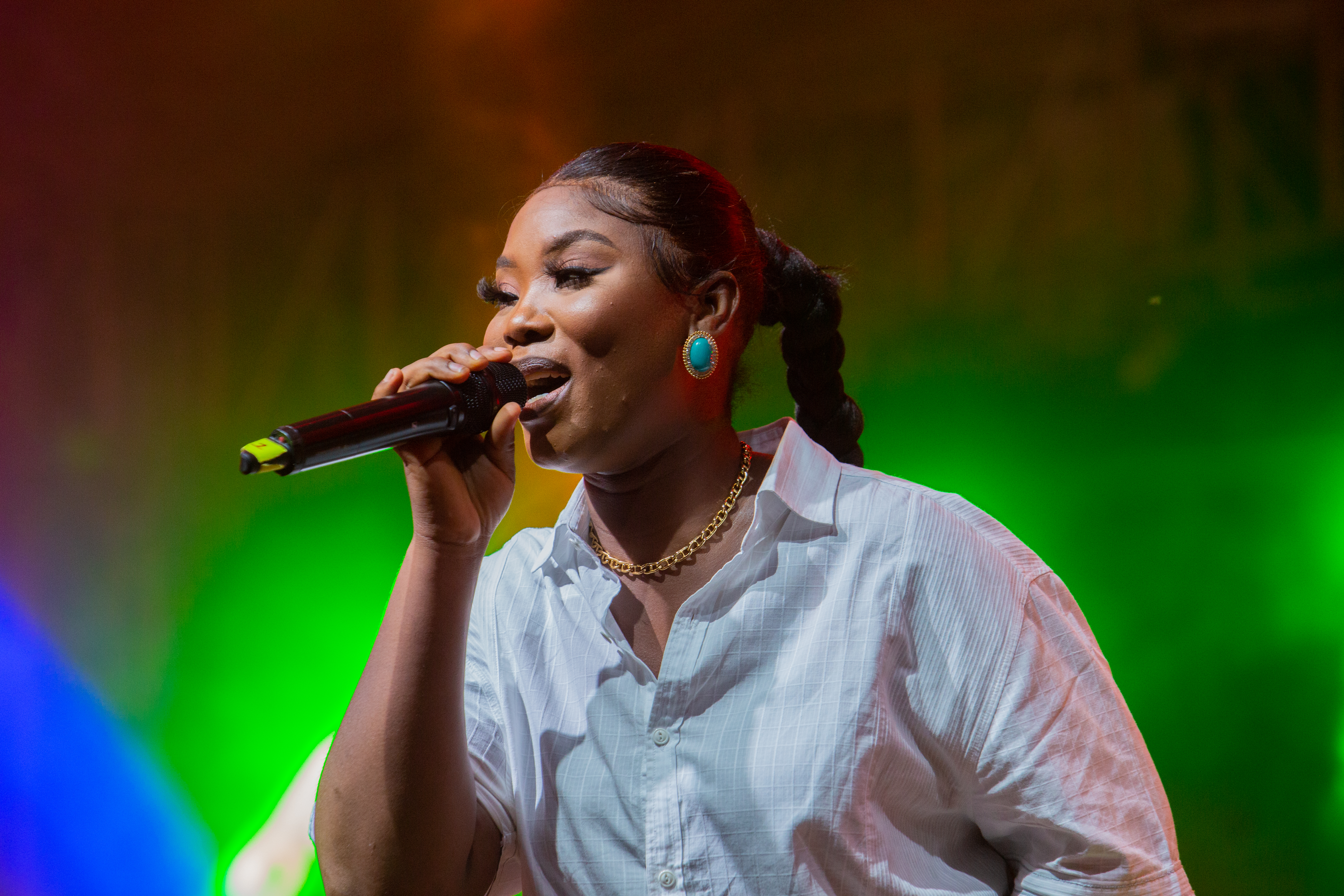
- Roseline Layo at FEMUEA15 in Bouaké, 2023.
- Born: 21 December 1993 (age 31); Man, Ivory Coast
- Occupation: Singer
- Years active: 2021 – present

Roseline Layo (b. 21 December 1993) is an Ivorian Gospel singer. She was named best-emerging artist of the year at the 2023 Trace Awards and holds two gold records in France and Cote d'Ivoire.

== Early life ==
Layo was born in the city of Man, western Côte d'Ivoire. She is of the Dan ethnic group. Her mother is a housewife and her father works at the National Office of Technical Studies and Development.

== Career ==
In 2014, at age 23, Layo competed on the Ivorian public TV show Star Karaoké (RTI), finishing third place. She then joined the all-female orchestra Bella Mondo.

She became known thanks to her 2021 song "Donnez-nous un peu".

In 2022, Layo released three singles: "C'est La même Phase", "Aweman Napie" and "Kinoue".

== Discography ==
Studio albums

- Elus De Dieu (Deluxe) (2023)
