= Nahawa Doumbia =

Malian singer

Nahawa Doumbia (born ca. 1961) is a singer from Mali's Wassoulou region.

== Biography and career ==
A lot of women sing love songs, but I'm a fighter. I fight for children's education and for marriage--particularly for monogamy. Good relationships are very important. You have to work in order to succeed.

— Nahawa Doumbia, to Chris Nickson, 2000

Doumbia, in a career that lasted for over four decades, was an important musician in the development and definition of Wassoulou music, the popular music from her area of Southern Mali, which in turn had a great influence on Mali's musical culture. Doumbia was born into a caste of blacksmiths and so wouldn't have been allowed to sing, but broke that taboo. Her career got started after she won a contest on the French-language radio station Radio France Internationale. Scholar Lucy O'Brien mentioned her as one of the women who created a music that gave voice to female expression, and praised her "high-tech poetry and metaphor" in a study of women in popular music.

Her debut album, La Grande Cantatrice Malienne Vol 1, was recorded with N’Gou Bagayoko, who played acoustic guitar and who later became her husband. After her first recording, as a duo, she moved toward playing with larger groups that incorporated synthesizers and electric guitar. La Grande Cantatrice was released on AS Records, a record label from Côte d'Ivoire. It was rereleased in 2019 by Awesome Tapes From Africa.

In 2021, Awesome Tapes released a new album, Kanawa ("Don't Go"). The album contains material about Mali's problems--"terrorist attacks by the West African offshoot of ISIS, continued French military intervention, widespread strikes and protests and a coup d’etat". The title track urges the young people of Mali to stay in the country, lest they fall victim to human trafficking. The album was recorded in Bamako, in Salif Keita's studio. Instrumentation included the traditional ngoni and a modern version thereof, and the kamale ngoni, besides guitar. According to reviewer Eugene Ulman, "The arrangements, building from mostly acoustic to bass-heavy grooves, are sparse and deliberate: every detail, down to the smallest karignan (metal scraper) and the gunshot samples (incorporated into the percussion palette) are placed with meticulous care."

She wrote a song in honor of Thomas Sankara, the revolutionary who became the President of Burkina Faso.
