= Hawa Boussim =

Burkinabé singer

- Born: November 24, 1971 (age 54); Kipoura, Boulgou Province, Burkina Faso
- Genres: Afropop; coupé-décalé; world music
- Occupation: Singer
- Years active: 1985–present

Hawa Boussim (born November 24, 1971 in Kipoura, Boulgou Province, Burkina Faso) is a Burkinabé singer.

== Biography ==
Hawa Boussim was born on November 24, 1971 in Kipoura, in the province of Boulgou, Burkina Faso, just a few kilometres from the border with Ghana. From the age of 14, she sang for her community for various occasions like baptisms, weddings and funerals but she wasn't given an opportunity of a complete education. She expresses herself and sings in the Bissa language. She became the third wife of a household with four wives.

In 2009, she took part in a contest organised by a local cultural association and won. Thanks to a member of her family, Jean-Pierre Boussim, director of a radio station in Zabré, the opportunity arose to record her first self-produced album, Môbidoré, in 2011. She then agreed to associate her singing, with ancestral roots, with Afropop instruments like those fashionable in neighbouring Nigeria. She appeared on television as well as Festival MASA. She has performed in stages in West Africa, from Burkina Faso to the Ivory Coast, in Europe and in the United States. In 2017, she released a second album, Mingoureza. The album met success and notoriety for its cultural associations and its discussion of a social problem, food waste and waste in general.

She was, meanwhile, spotted by Sony Music, especially by José da Silva. In April 2018, she won the Kundé d'Or.
