= Boncana Maïga =

Malian composer and musician (1949–2026)

- Born: Boncana Issa Maïga; 1949; Gao, French Sudan, French West Africa
- Died: 28 February 2026 (aged 77); Bamako, Mali
- Occupations: Composer, musician
- Children: 4

Boncana Issa Maïga (1949 – 28 February 2026) was a Malian composer and musician. He won a Kora Award in the category Best Arrangement of Africa.

Maïga died in Bamako on 28 February 2026, at the age of 77.
