= Serge Beynaud =

Ivorian singer and producer

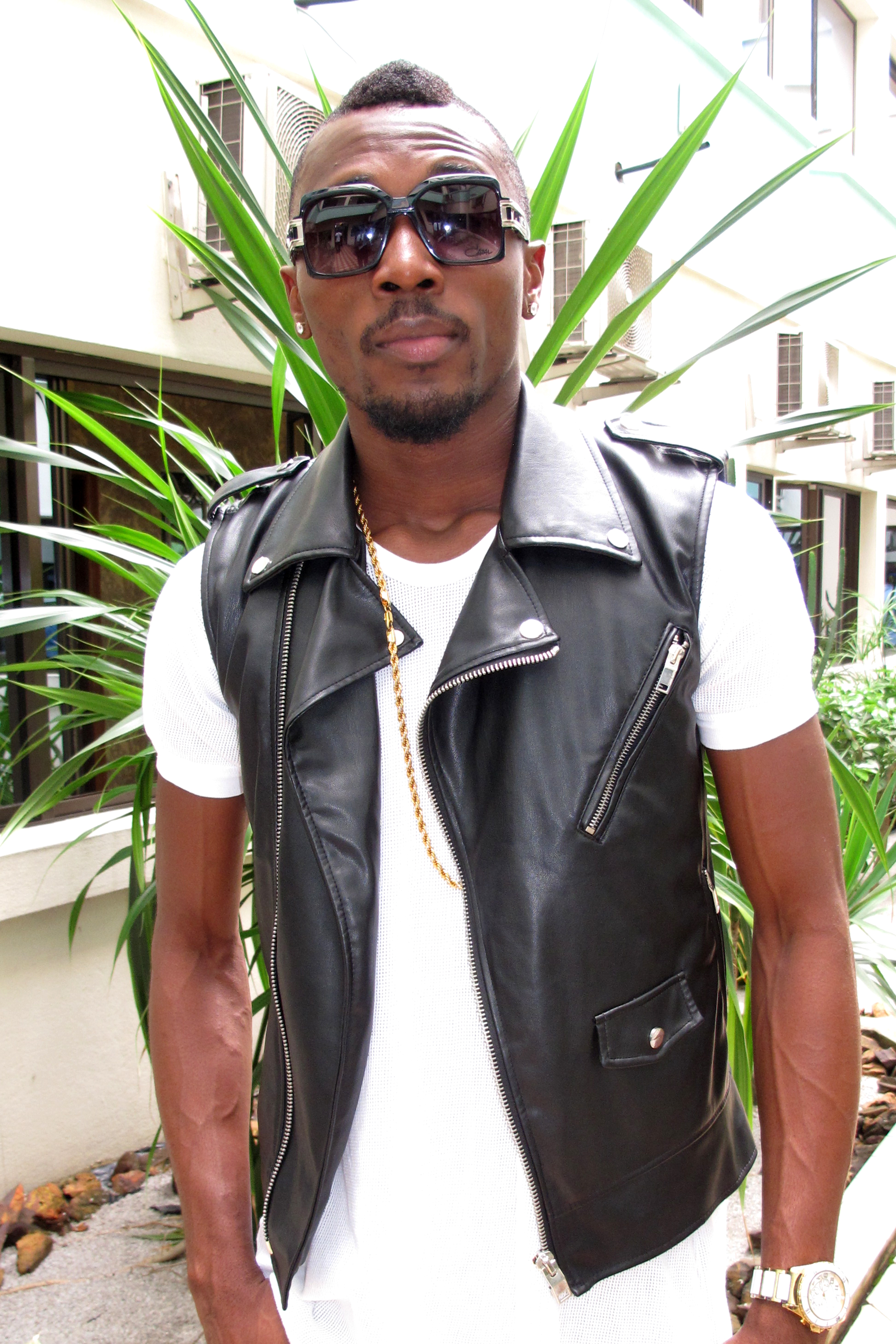
- Born: September 19, 1987 (age 38); Abidjan
- Occupations: Music arranger; Singer

Serge Beynaud (real name Guy Serge Beynaud Gnolou but sometimes also called Beynaud; born 19 September 1987 in Yopougon, Abidjan) is an Ivorian singer, songwriter and music producer, associated with styles such as Coupé-Décalé and Loko loko. AllAfrica.com has described Beynaud as an "Ivorian sensation" and a "heavyweight act". In February 2015, he was #1 in the StarAfrica Top 10, with his song Fouinta Fouinte.

== Biography ==
Born in Yopougon in the south-east of Abidjan in the Lagunes Region to a military father, he has been composing songs since his childhood. He is noted for his stylish and dandy style of dress and is one of the most noted figures in the Coupé-Décalé scene. His ethnicity can be traced to the Bété people.

== Albums ==
- Le mannequin des arrangeurs
- Seul Dieu
- Talehi
