= Dicko Fils =

Burkinabé musician of Fulɓe origin (born 1975)

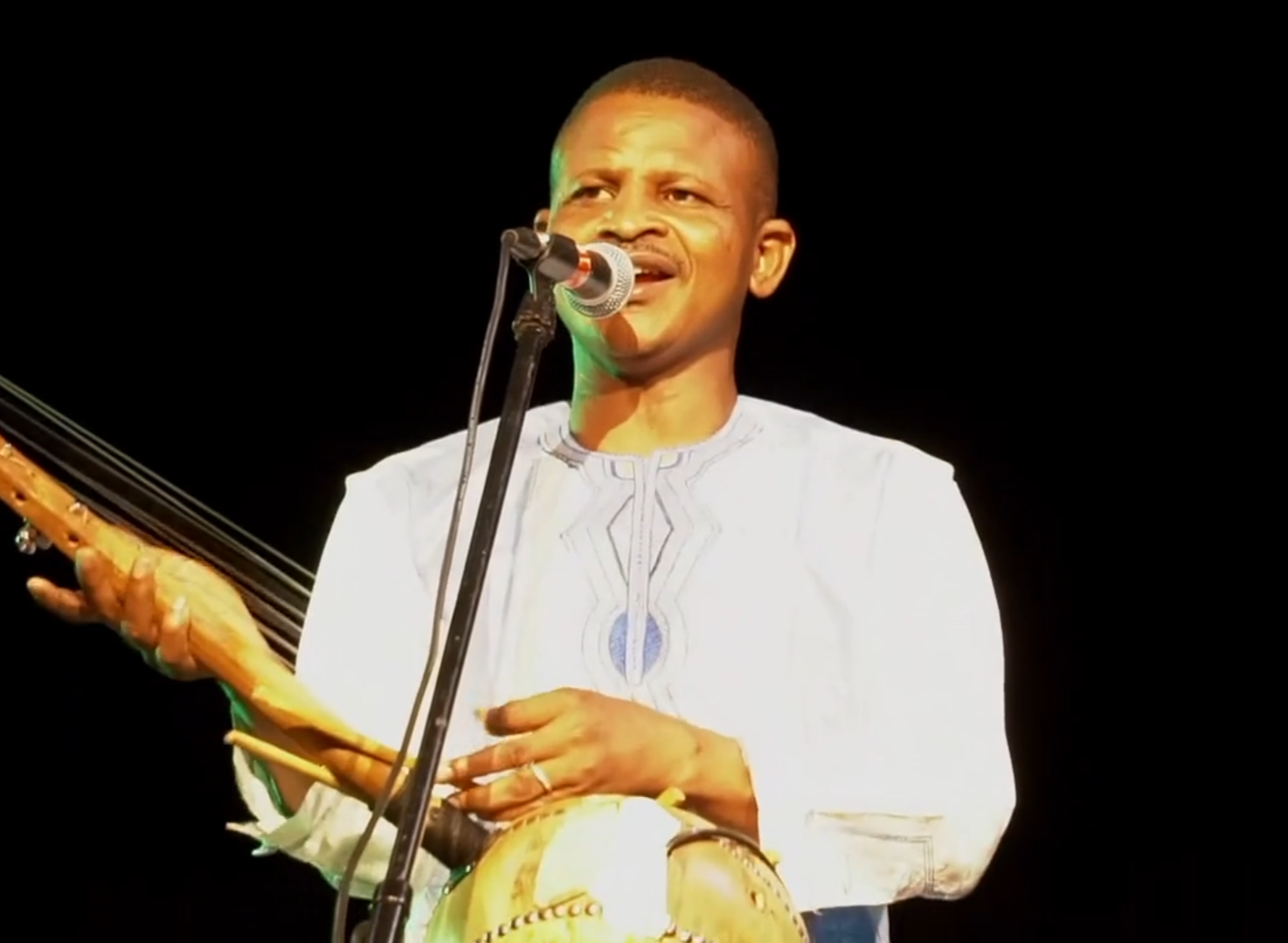
- Dicko Fils in 2017

Background information
- Born: Moulaye Dicko; 1975 (age 50–51); Centre Region, Burkina Faso
- Genres: Coupé-décalé; reggae; world music
- Occupations: Singer; kamale n'goni player
- Years active: 1992–present

Moulaye Dicko, better known by his stage name Dicko Fils, is a Burkinabé musician of Fulɓe origin. He sings and plays the kamale n'goni.

== Life and career ==
Born in 1975 in a village near the capital Ouagadougou, Moulaye Dicko, the sixth of 14 children, began studying French in Abidjan, Côte d'Ivoire, where his father settled to develop his livestock business.

Aged 11, Dicko was sent to Mali in 1986 to follow Koranic studies. It is where he discovered and was fascinated by the voices of Salif Kéita, Oumou Sangaré and Ali Farka Touré, among others.

Back in Abidjan in 1992, Dicko became interested in reggae music, which he believed gave him the heart to express himself and share what he had acquired in his past years. His activities in the world of sewing, a necessary livelihood, would quickly be set aside to work only on the development of his band "Le Faso Kanou" with young Congolese, Cameroonians and Ivorians. He released his first album in 2005. It is at the time of the release of this album that Dicko Fils decided to return to his country, Burkina Faso.

He recomposed his group where modern instruments (drums, bass guitars and solo) and traditional instruments (balafon, djembe, tamani) were assembled, and Dicko Fils appropriated the kamale n'goni, with which he excelled for a long time. Two musicians and dancers joined the musicians. He became noted for his particularly melodic voice, passing from low to high in a surprising way, and appropriating the particular rhythms of his soil, playing as much on the Dioula tradition as on the Fula tradition of which he originates. Dicko Fils quickly became an artist recognised throughout West Africa, chaining the release of albums in 2005, 2007, 2010, 2012, 2014 and 2016. The national media in 2014 seized on his album "Fina Tawa" composed entirely in Fulfulde, the Fula language. The success was such that his flagship piece "Denke Denke" became played in many dance venues.

Regularly invited to events such as the FESPACO, International Art and Craft Fair, Ouagadougou (SIAO), National Culture Week of Burkina Faso (SNC), Saga Musik Festival in Ouagadougou, WEELTARE and the Cultural and Horse Festival of Barani (FECHIBA), he has also provided musical production in theatrical creations such as Recreatrales and Un Village Dans Une Ville. Other events he has participated in include:

- 2003 – Massa Festival in Côte d'Ivoire
- 2007 and 2013 – Les Nuits Atypiques de Koudougou
- 2008 – Festival Blues du Fleuve in Senegal
- 2008 to 2014 – Jazz in Ouaga
- 2009 – Theater Festival in Germany
- 2010 – World Music Festival in Holland
- 2013 – Theatre Creation "ANTIGONE" evoking the life of Nelson Mandela
- 2013 – Caravane Tour Sahel in Niamey, in collaboration with Nigerien musician Bourdé 2rda Galo and Beninese musician Koudy
- 2014 – Jazz-Creation "From Here to There" with Klode Gomez, Tim Winsley and Marcel Balboné
- 21 March 2015 – FAMA 2015 (Faso Music Awards) - Best Artist of the Year Special Ado Leontine Gorgo Award.

On 30 May 2015, Dicko was involved in a traffic accident, suffering fractured wrists. Two occupants of his vehicle, including fellow Burkinabé singer Awa Nadia, suffered serious injuries, both losing consciousness.

== Awards ==
He received the Knight's Cross of the Order of Merit from the Ministry of Culture of Burkina Faso in 2011. He also won the Golden Kundé award for the best music of Burkina Faso in 2016.

== Discography ==
=== Albums ===
- TOUNGA (2005): Mali- and Côte d'Ivoire-inspired reggae and "blues-Mandinka" album; produced by ETK production house at the LASOL Sound studio;
- LADA KORO (2007) songs of texts in Moore, Bambara, Fulfulde and French that speak of "love, peace and traditions"; produced by ETK production house;
- FARAFINA (2010) and SABABOU (2012) produced by Dicko Fils;
- FINA-TAWA (2014) performed in Fulfuldé whose title track "Denke Denke" has brought Peulh music into many dance venues.
