= Floby (musician) =

Ivorian-Burkinabé singer

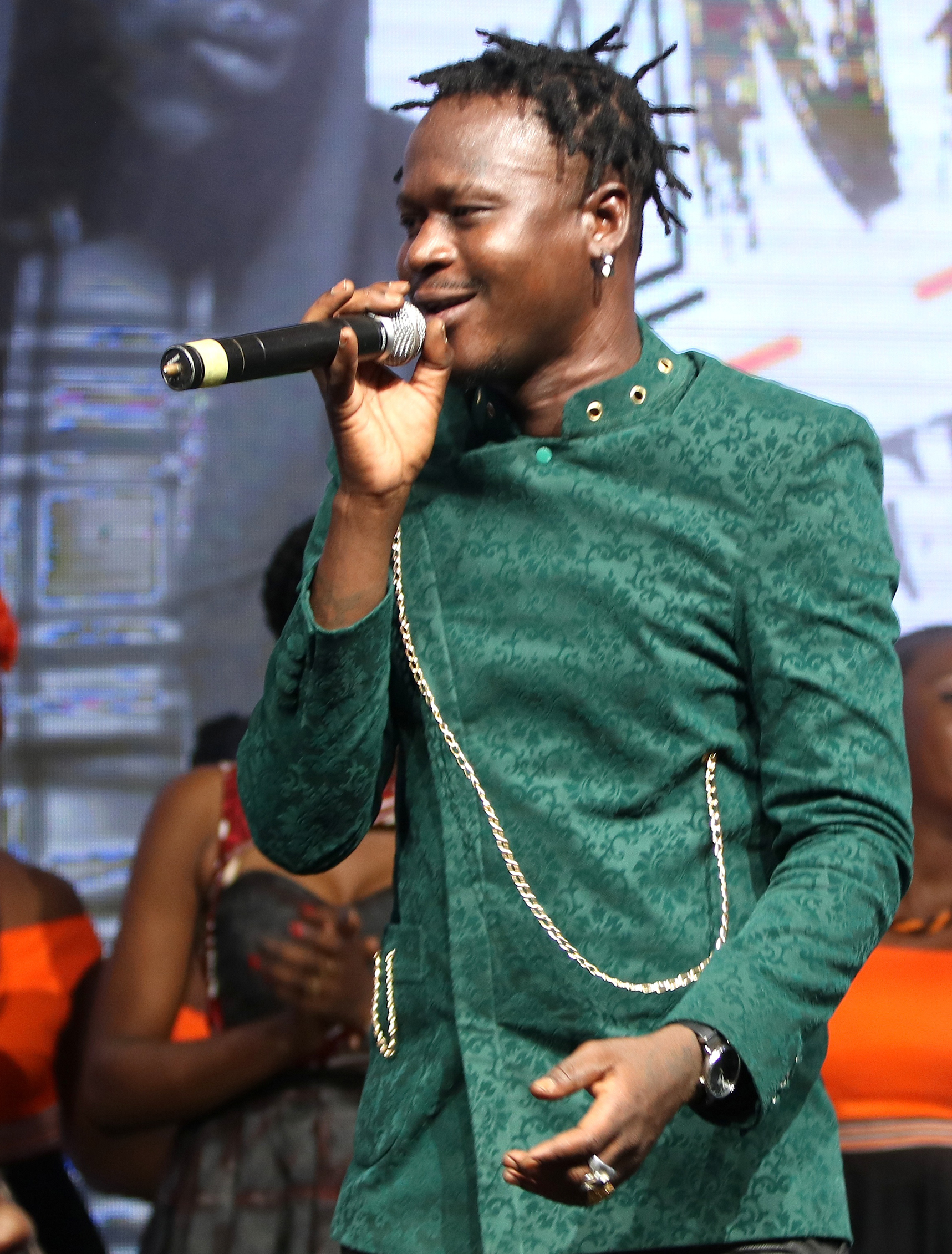
- Floby in 2019

Background information
- Born: Florent Belemgnegré; Kouritenga, Burkina Faso
- Genre: Coupé-décalé
- Occupation: Singer
- Years active: 2006–present

Florent Belemgnegré, better known by his stage name Floby, is a Burkinabé singer and musician. He sings in the French and Mòoré languages. His music uses African sounds such as the kora and djembe but also rap and electric guitar.

He is also known by the nicknames le King Zodanga, le Papa des Orphelins and le Kirikou d’Afrique.

== Life and career ==
Belemgnegré was born in the Bingerville suburb of Abidjan, Côte d'Ivoire. At age five, he moved to Burkina Faso and lived with grandmother, who was a griot. On 15 January 2017, Floby was made Noom Naaba or "Chief of the Atmosphere" of Andemtenga, in Kouritenga Province, by the customary canton chief.

== Personal life ==
As of 2014, Floby has one daughter.

== Awards ==
Floby received two Kundé awards each in 2007, 2015 and 2016 and won the Golden Kundé in 2010.

== Discography ==
=== Studio albums ===
- Mam Sooré (My Way) (2006)
- Wuilgui Maam (Guide Me) (2009)
- Wend'mi (2012)
- M'pengda Wendé (2015)
- Wakato (2018)
- Wend'so (2021)

=== Extended plays/maxi singles ===
- Be Positif EP (2014)

=== Singles ===
- Tu me connais (You know me) (2016)
- Sugar Daddy (feat Tanya) (2021)

== Relevant literature ==
- Yaogo, Gérard. "LA PLACE DU PROVERBE DANS LES CHANSONS DE FLOBY." DJIBOUL Spécial N°06 304 – 319. 2022
