= Anoumabo Urban Music Festival =

Annual festival in Ivory Coast

Anoumabo Urban Music Festival Festival des musiques urbaines d'Anoumabo
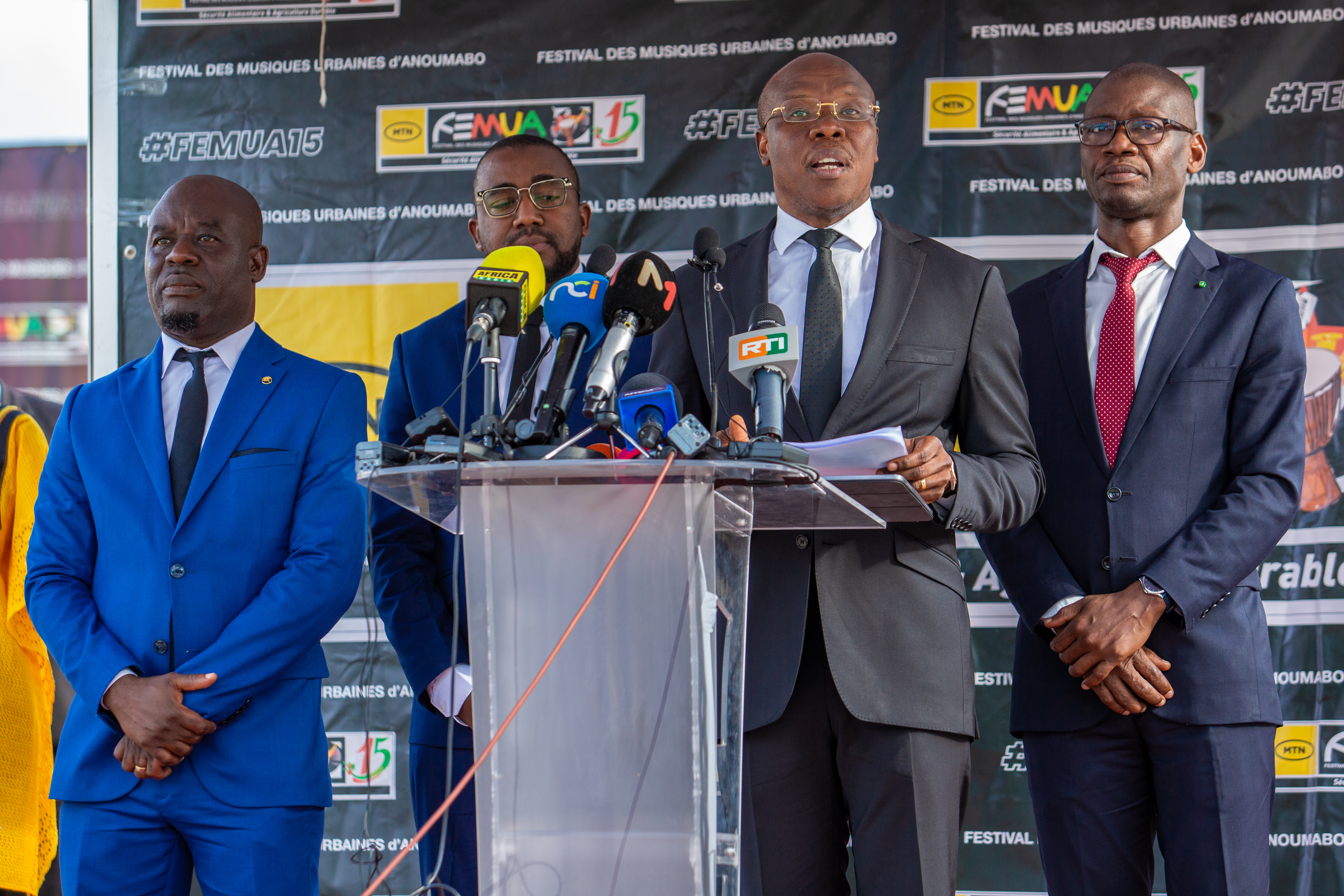
- Magic System during the opening ceremony of the 15th Anoumabo Urban Music Festival.
- Nickname: FEMUA
- Genre: Music festival
- Begins: 2008
- Frequency: Annually
- Locations: Anoumabo, Abidjan
- Country: Ivory Coast
- Founder: A'Salfo
- Organiser: Gaou Production
- Website: www.femua.com

The Anoumabo Urban Music Festival or Festival des musiques urbaines d'Anoumabo (FEMUA) is an Afropop music festival that was created in 2008. It is held mainly in Abidjan, Ivory Coast. It brings together important contemporary artists from Africa and around the world for a week, usually in Anoumabo in the south of Abidjan. It is one of the largest music festivals in Africa, with more than 40,000 spectators in 2017. Admission to the concerts is free and some artists donate their royalties to a local development project. An annex of the festival, Femua Kids, is intended for children.

== History ==
Initiated in 2008 by A'Salfo, leader of the Magic System group (who himself grew up in the village of Anoumabo), Femua stems from the desire to offer, each year, to the village that adopted and saw the four members of the Magic System group grow up, a show bringing together the biggest stars in the world. In 2008, from the first edition, Femua lacked support and was held through self-financing. It was a success in three days of festival. In 2011, the fourth edition of the festival, which was to be held during the Easter period, was postponed due to the post-election crisis that Ivory Coast experienced. It was finally from 23 to 26 June that this happened. Over the years, Femua, which has gone from three to six days of festival, mobilizes more and more partners, then develops in terms of content and audience.

In 2016, during the ninth edition, on 24 April, while he was the headliner of the festival's guest artists, Congolese singer Papa Wemba died on the Femua stage, following a malaise. The festival was therefore stopped. A tribute vigil was held on the Femua stage the following week. On 24 April 2017, one year later, another tribute was paid to Papa Wemba on the festival grounds. The 2017 edition reached a record of over 40,000 spectators. Femua 11 was launched on 15 March 2018 by the Minister of Culture and Francophonie Maurice Bandaman. Exceptionally, this edition did not take place in Anoumabo: it was spread over several consecutive evenings in another location in Abidjan and a closing evening in Korhogo, in the north of the country. Only the "Femua Kids" stage is held in Anoumabo that year. The 2018 edition deals with illegal emigration to Europe in particular, with the central theme: African youth and illegal immigration. This edition is publicly supported by the State Secretariat for Technical Education.

Femua 2019, which is held from April 23 to 28, with the theme Gender and Development, is launched on March 14 in Abidjan in the presence of the First Lady of Côte d'Ivoire Dominique Ouattara. In 2020, Femua 13, which was scheduled to be held from April 14 to 19, was postponed due to the COVID-19 pandemic and took place from 7 to 12 September 2021. After the 2022 edition (Femua 14), the Anoumabo Urban Music Festival is in its 15th edition in 2023, with the theme: Food security and sustainable agriculture.

== Budget and impact ==
While the first editions of Femua were financed by the royalties of the Magic System group, many public and private partners now support the festival. For example, the first edition of Femua was organized with a budget of 34 million CFA francs, while the 2017 edition cost around 680 million CFA francs (10% of which was allocated to Femua Kids). For the 2018 edition, 1% of the Femua budget was covered by the Ministry of Culture. The main donor of the festival is the Ivorian subsidiary of the South African telecommunications group MTN. Even if the festival's budget is "always in deficit", as its founder claims, it has enabled the construction of at least four schools and two maternity hospitals. Since 2023, Femua has been included in the budget of the State of Ivory Coast.

== Partners ==
Femua has had MTN Group as its official partner since 2010. The Radiodiffusion Television Ivoirienne (RTI), the Ivorian Electricity Company (CIE) and the African Lemonade and Brewery Company (Solibra) are also among the festival's partners.

== Editions ==
No.	Year	Dates	Artists
1	2008		Magic System; Meiway; Petit Denis; Dream Team; Volcano DJ; Les Patrons; Les Garagistes; Erickson le Zulu; Les Marabouts
2	2009	11–13 April	Magic System; Singuila; Leslie; Marc-Antoine; Yeleen; Zaho; Kore; Willy Denzey; Didier Awadi; Les Garagistes; Erickson Le Zoulou; Kajeem; Alif Naaba; King Mensah
3	2010	3–6 June	Sekouba Bambino; Ismaël Lô; Serge Kassy; Aïcha Koné; Soum Bill; Magic System; Mokobé; Toofan; Bil Aka Kora; O`nel Mala; Ismaël Isaac; Yodé & Siro; Extra Musica
4	2011	23–26 June	Patience Dabany; Omar Pene; Kojo Antwi; Soprano; Floby; DJ Arafat; Meiway; Fally Ipupa; Jessy Matador, Tiken Jah Fakoly; Magic System
5	2012	6–9 April	Sexion d'Assaut; X-Maleya; Angélique Kidjo; Lokua Kanza; Werrason; Coumba Gawlo; Daara J; Flavour; Pit Baccardi; Billy Billy; Les Reines Mères; Molière; Serge Beynaud; Molare
6	2013	11–14 April	Angélique Kidjo; Oumou Sangaré; JB Mpiana; La Fouine; Sothéca; Dobet Gnahoré; Sam Fan Thomas; Mix Premier; Les Patrons; Alif Naaba
7	2014	1–6 April	Alpha Blondy; Lady Ponce; Amadou & Mariam; Ferré Gola; Maxy Sedumedi; Sana Bob; Gyedu-Blay Ambolley; Nigui Saff K-Dance; Fodé Baro; Pierrette Adams; Espoir 2000; Debordo Lekunfa; Sur-Choc; Hamed Farras; Affou Kéita
8	2015	21–26 April	Fally Ipupa; Bracket; Smarty; Philip Monteiro; Meta And The Cornestones; Zaho; Habib Koité; Joel Sebunjo; Freshlyground; Antoinette Konan; Bally Spinto; Ras Goody Brown; Kedjevara DJ; Zouglou Maker; Bamba Amy Sarah
9	2016	19–23 April	Papa Wemba; Charlotte Dipanda; Kery James; John Kiffy; Yabongo Lova; Boni Gnahoré; Vieux Farka Touré; Abou Nidal; Ijahman Levi; Toofan
10	2017	25–30 April	Black M; Salif Keita; Tiken Jah Fakoly; Singuila; Marema Fall; Bisa K'Dei; Soul Bang's; Révolution; Nash; DJ Leo; Kiff No Beat; Kruman Group
11	2018	17–22 April	Soprano; Lokua Kanza; Sidiki Diabaté; Yemi Alade; Dub Inc; Bil Aka Kora; Zeynab Habib; M'Bouillé Koité; Magic System; Dobet Gnahoré; DJ Kedjevara; Les Leaders; Guy Christ Israël; Sidonie la Tigresse; Luckson Padaud
12	2019	23–28 April	Kaaris; Mani Bella; Extra Musica; Chantal Taïba; Josey; Allah Thérèse; DJ Mulukuku; Kerozen; Oumou Sangaré; Yvan Buravan; Claire Bahi; Chidinma; Molière; Bi Pomi Junior; Femi Kuti
13	2021	7–12 September	Koffi Olomide; Vegedream; Zahara; Pape Diouf; David Carreira; Mala Rodríguez; Keen'V; Rajaa Kessabny; Joel Sebunjo; Zaz; Young Ace Wayé; Floby; Céline Banza; Daphné; Soum Bill; Kajeem; Ariel Sheney; Mathey; Mix Premier; Magic Diesel; Eden
14	2022	10–15 May	Youssoupha; Diamond Platnumz; Shan'L; Yodé & Siro; Innoss'B; Iba One; Coco Argentée; Magic System; Debordo Leekunfa; Rocky Gold; Suspect 95; Nestor David; Félix Wazekwa; Viva La Musica
15	2023	25–30 April	Booba; Ferré Gola; Didi B; Singuila; Baaba Maal; KS Bloom; Roseline Layo; Nouray and the Lions; Safarel Obiang; Alesh; Samy Succès
