= Music of Ivory Coast =

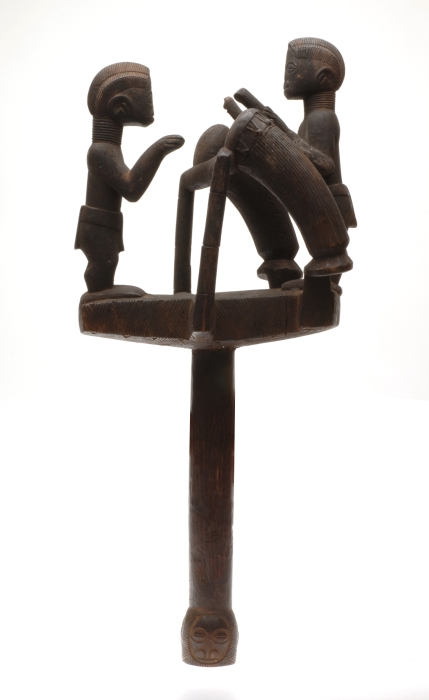
Wood carving of drummers, Baoule

The music of Ivory Coast includes music genres of many ethnic communities, often characterised by vocal polyphony especially among the Baoulé, talking drums especially among the Nzema people and by the characteristic polyrhythms found in rhythm in Sub-Saharan Africa.

Popular music genres from Ivory Coast include zouglou and Coupé-Décalé. A few Ivorian artists who have known international success are Magic System, Alpha Blondy, Dobet Gnahoré, Tiken Jah Fakoly, Meiway and Christina Goh.

== National music ==
Ivory Coast's national anthem is L'Abidjanaise. French is the official language taught and spoken by Ivorians but many Ivorians have their own ethnic tribal language.

There are many music genres in Ivory Coast, music from different tribes Coupé-Decalé, Zouglou, Pop, Arabic musics etc. Ivory Coast have different varieties of music based on the population race living there.

== Traditional music ==
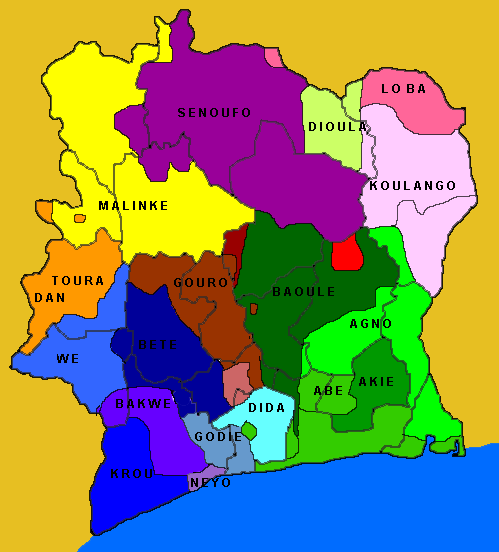
Ethnic groups of Ivory Coast

Ethnic groups of Ivory Coast include Akan 42.1%, Voltaic or Gur speakers 17.6%, Northern Mandes 16.5%, Krous 11%, Southern Mandes 10%, other 2.8% (includes 30,000 Lebanese and 45,000 French) (2004). The immigrant community makes up over 20% of a population of over 6 million. An estimated 65 native languages are spoken in the country. Dyula acts as a trade language and is commonly spoken by Muslims.

Each of the ethnic groups has its own folk music traditions, most showing strong vocal polyphony (a common characteristic of African music). Talking drums are common among the Nzema people, who are also known for their abissa purification dance, part of the popular N'Guess Bon Sens, Savane Alla, Kolouba Nobert, Religious music of Emi Tiapo dance music of Meiway.

== Popular music ==
Gbégbé, a Bété rhythm, has been a part of popular music since Ivory Coast's independence, popularized by Soeurs Comöé and later, Frères Djatys and Sery Simplice. Ernesto Djédjé, however, is considered the father of Ivorian popular music. Using one of the folk rhythms of the Bété, as well as his teacher Amédée Pierre's dopé style, Djédjé has long been an advocate of Ivorian music, railing against the "Congolization" of the Abidjan scene. Outside of Ivory Coast, Djédjé is best known for 1977's Gnoantre-Ziboté, which was a Pan-African hit, and found some success in France and Canada. He plays a type of music called ziglibithy.

Since Djédjé, few Ivorian musicians have been able to achieve the same level of fame. Luckson Padaud's laba laba style, which is similar to the Bété ziglibithy, has had some success, as has Gnaore Djimi's polihet.

=== Ivorian artists in World styles ===
The most popular styles in Ivory Coast are imported reggae from Jamaica, hip hop from the United States, Ndombolo from Congo, Zouk from the Caribbean and Couper Decaler; the country has produced notable musicians of both genres, especially Alpha Blondy who produces reggae. Tiken Jah Fakoly is another popular Ivorian reggae musician, who has been living in exile due to his politically outspoken lyrics. Perhaps uniquely in Africa reggae is the most popular music genre in Abidjan.

=== Hip Hop ===
Hip hop has been popular in Ivory Coast since the mid-1990s, and includes a gangsta rap-influenced style called rap dogba. Notable hip hop musicians include All Mighty, Rudy Rudiction, M.C. Claver and Angelo. The new R&B group 2431(formerly known as Monah) is also taking over, as R&B became very famous since U.S. chart-topping Akon had a concert in Abidjan, late 2006. Other R&B stars include Teeyah and Tour de Garde. The victory of Ivorian hip hop group Kiff No Beat at the biggest hip-hop competition in Ivory Coast called Faya Flow in 2009 increased the profile of the genre there.

=== Jazz ===
Luc Sigui (born 7 April 1968 in Abidjan), is a smooth jazz guitarist & singer, Luc Sigui released first album "Jemima", 2008. From 2000 to 2004 he attended to famous guitarist course like, Eric Boell, Fred Sokolow, Denis Roux, to perform his jazz. In 2000 he was called by a famous African band of Pop Music called "Woody" to be the guitarist. In 1996, he formed with some others Ivorian Christians Musicians and singers a gospel team called Resurrection; and release 3 albums of Gospel Music. In 1991 he won the award of young budding musician of Côte d’Ivoire.Luc Sigui released with Universal, in 2008 a jazz album, called "Jemima" an album that ranks among the albums benchmarked for smooth jazz.

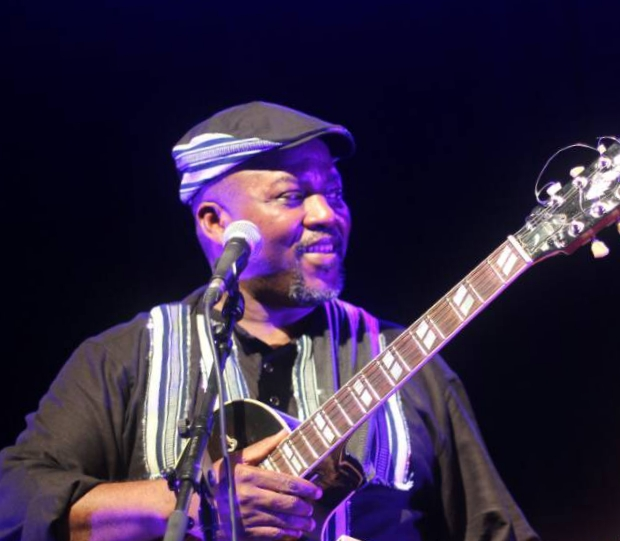
Luc Sigui Concert

=== Zoblazo ===
Zoblazo, pioneered from 1990 by Freddy Meiway, the former front man to the bands Les Genitaux, Defense d'Ivoire, and Zo Gang, integrated traditional rhythms of southern Ivory Coast with electronic instruments and party lyrics. His success across the country in the mid to late 1990s spawned a string of hit Zoblazo records that has continued through 2007, even as other dance styles, like coupé décalé have edged out Zoblazo. Even Meiway, through a series of guest musicians like Manu Dibango, Jacob Desvarieux, Lokua Kanza, Kojo Antwi and Koffi Olomidé has added Cuban, Mbalax and Ghanaian Hi-life musics.

=== Zouglou ===
Zouglou, a recent Ivorian popular tradition, comes from the early 1990s when university students, upset about living conditions on campus, began rallying around Didier Bilé. Zouglou was satirical in nature, and usually accompanied by a dance to a fictional god. The most popular artists of Zouglou are Petit Yodé & l'enfant Siro, Magic System, Petit Denis and Espoir 2000. Many popular Ivorian zouglou artists are now living in exile due to their political support to the former president Laurent Gbagbo.

=== Coupé-Décalé ===
Coupé-Décalé was pioneered by the late Stephane Doukouré (a.k.. "Douk-Saga") during the post-2002 militaro-political crisis in Ivory Coast. It reflects the aspirations of a large section of Ivorian youth. Coupé-Décalé is a very percussive style featuring African samples, Congo beats, deep bass, and repetitive, minimalist arrangements. Lyrically, Coupé-Décalé is about happiness, expressing daily life in Ivorian society, and also gives an insight into the political situation of the country. The prominent artists of Coupé-Décalé are Arafat DJ (Yôrôbô) with its concepts coming out every time that his is asked for. His music is for the youth. And many other talented Ivorian artists. The most prominent singer in actuality is named DJ Mix 1er with its croubata dance, derived from Coupé-Décalé. Other names like David Tayorault, Afrika Representer, Kédjévara, Chouchou Salvador, Anderson 1er, DJ Léo, Bébi Philip, Safarel, Serge Beynaud, Débordo Leekunfa, and Doliziana Débordo are recurrent.

== See also ==
- Ahoko
