= The Voice Afrique Francophone =

French-language African television program

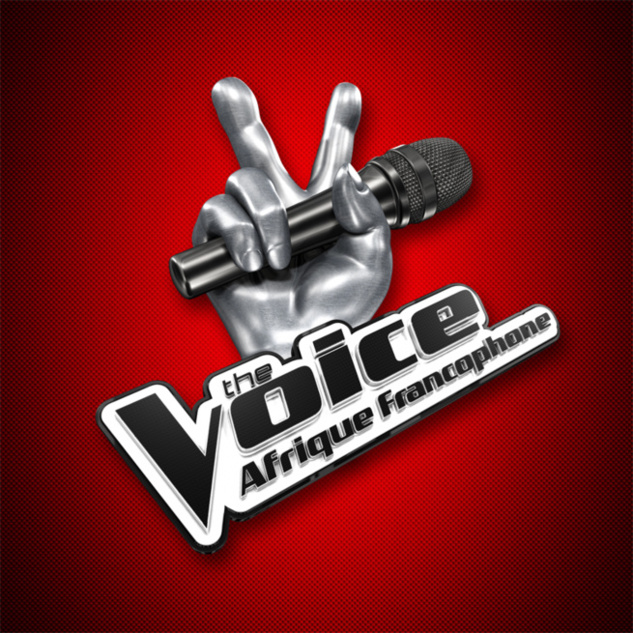
- Genre: Talent show
- Created by: John de Mol Jr.
- Presented by: Claudy Siar (2016–2021); Yves Zogbo Jr. (2024)
- Judges: Lokua Kanza (2016–2021); A'salfo (2016–2018); Charlotte Dipanda (2016–2021); Singuila (2016–2018); Hiro Le Coq (2020–2021); Nayanka Bell (2020–2021); O’Nel Mala (2024); Didi B (2024); Mix Premier (2024); Josey (2024–); Meiway (2026–); Emma'a (2026–); Franglish (2026–)
- Country of origin: Ivory Coast
- Original language: French
- No. of seasons: 4

Production
- Production location: South Africa
- Running time: 100 min.
- Production company: AMPN

Original release
- Network: VoxAfrica; RTI 1 (2016–2024)
- Release: 15 October 2016 – 28 July 2024
- Network: Canal+
- Release: 2026

Related
- The Voice (franchise); The Voice of Holland

The Voice Afrique francophone is the French-speaking African version of the reality singing competition The Voice, broadcast on VoxAfrica. It is based on the show The Voice of Holland, created by John de Mol Jr.

Four coaches, themselves popular performing artists, train singers on their team and occasionally perform with them. The competitors are selected in auditions where the coaches listen to the auditioning contestant without seeing them.

== Coaches and hosts ==
Coach	Seasons				
Coach	1	2	3	4	5
Lokua Kanza					
Charlotte Dipanda					
A'Salfo					
Singuila					
Nayanka Bell					
Hiro Le Coq					
O’Nel Mala					
Josey					
Mix Premier					
Didi B					
Meiway					
Emma'a					
Franglish					

The show is hosted by Claudy Siar. The original coaching panel included Charlotte Dipanda, Lokua Kanza, A'salfo and Singuila. All four coaches initially returned for the second season, but when the last shows were postponed, A'salfo and Dipanda were replaced by Youssoupha and Josey respectively, to serve as coaches from the Quarterfinals until the end of the season.

For the show's third cycle, Hiro Le Coq were confirmed as a new coach, while Charlotte Dipanda is also returning. On 26 July 2019, it was announced that Nayanka Bell will join the panel, along with Lokua Kanza who returns to the show for his third season as coach. However, Youssoupha replaced Bell for the live shows, as the latter was unable to return due to the Covid-19 pandemic.

== Series overview ==
Season	Aired	Winner	Runner-up	Third place	Fourth place	Winning coach	Hosts	Coaches (order)			
Season	Aired	Winner	Runner-up	Third place	Fourth place	Winning coach	Hosts	1	2	3	4
1	2016–2017	Pamela Baketana	Verushka	Marie-Love	Samson Nobou	Lokua Kanza	Claudy Siar	Lokua	Charlotte	Asalfo	Singuila
2	2017–2018	Victoire Biaku	Fulbert Davido	René	Dadiposlim	Charlotte Dipanda	Claudy Siar	Lokua	Charlotte	Asalfo	Singuila
3	2020–2021	Lady Shine	Gyovanni	Carina Sen	Foganne Atsou	Nayanka Bell	Claudy Siar	Lokua	Charlotte	Nayanka	Hiro
4	2024	Vova Music	Irma	Heraclès	Mondesir	Mix Premier	Yves Zogbo Jr	O'Nel	Josey	Mix	Didi B
5	2026	Saara Houansou	Original Ekwa	Val Rhan	Dreamer	Josey	Yves Zogbo Jr	Meiway	Emma'a	Josey	Franglish

== The Voice Afrique Francophone Kids ==
In February 2019, VoxAfrica announced their version of The Voice Kids. Sidiki Diabaté, Daphne Njie, Teeyah and KS Bloom were the coaches of the first season.

The first season of the series premiered on 1 October 2022 and was open to aspiring singers aged 8 to 15.

Season	Aired	Winner	Runner-up	Third place	Fourth place	Winning coach	Presenter	Coaches (chairs' order)			
Season	Aired	Winner	Runner-up	Third place	Fourth place	Winning coach	Presenter	1	2	3	4
1	2022	Myriam Obama	Salif	Marie Lucille	Fabio	Teeyah	Willy Dumbo	Teeyah	Sidiki	Daphne	KS Bloom

== See also ==
- East Africa's Got Talent
- Idols (East African TV series)
- Idols (West African TV series)
- Project Fame West Africa

== Notes ==
1. In season 2 of The Voice Afrique Francophone, A'salfo and Charlotte Dipanda originally signed up to serve as coaches full-time. However, due to a postponement which made the season finished later than planned, A'salfo and Dipanda were not able to resume their duties for the last four live shows because of pre-arranged commitments. Youssoupha and Josey replaced them, respectively, and served as coaches from the Quarterfinals until the end of the season. In the third season, Youssoupha again returned as coach replacing Nayanka Bell for the live shows, because Bell was unable to return due to the COVID-19 pandemic.
