= Céline Banza =

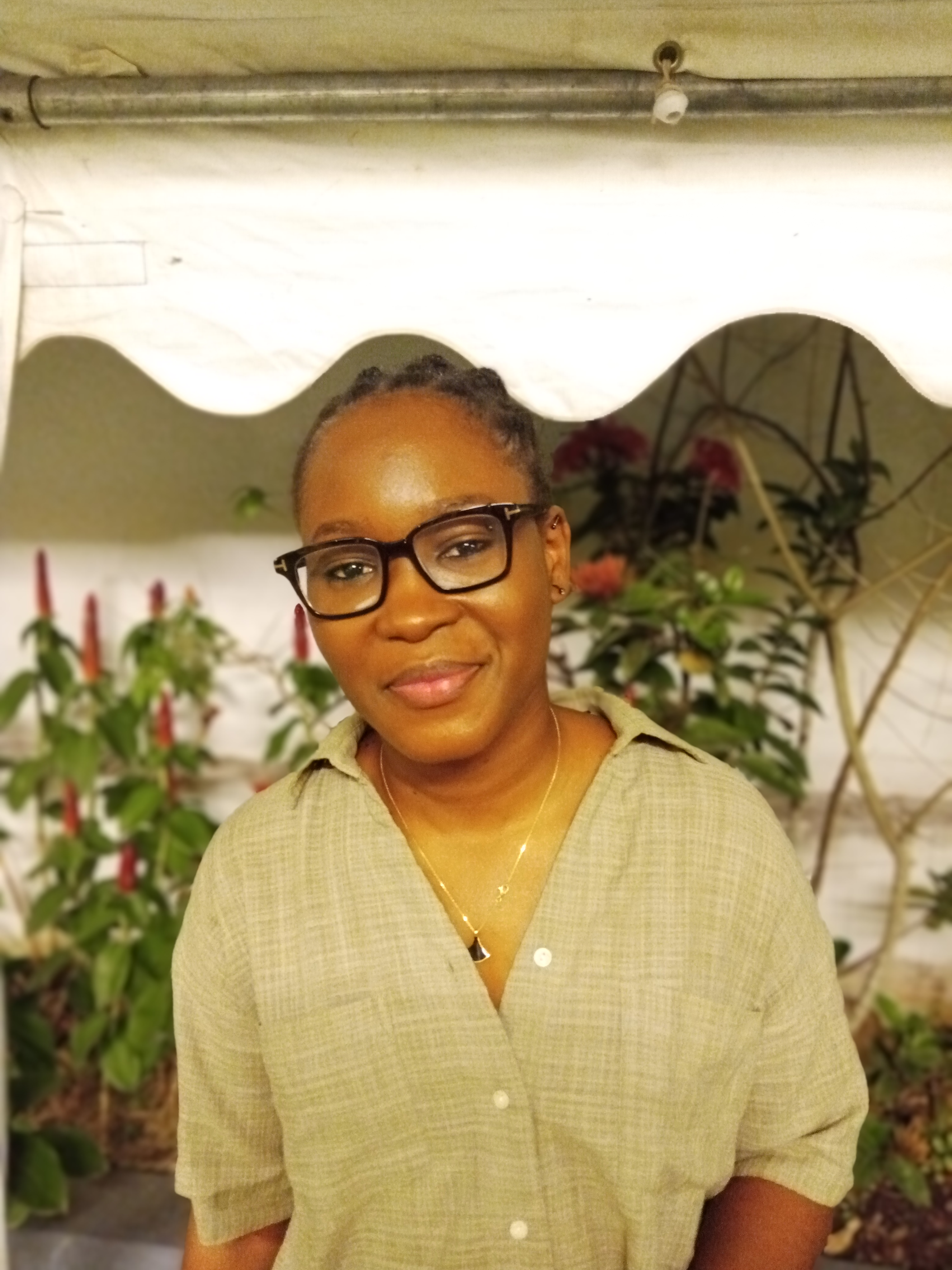

Background information
- Born: 12 February 1997 (age 29); Kinshasa, Zaire
- Genre: Afrobeats RnB
- Occupation: Singer
- Instruments: Vocals, Guitar
- Years active: 2007–present

Céline Banza (born on 12 February 1997) is a singer-songwriter and guitarist from the Democratic Republic of the Congo. She is the winner of the 2019 RFI Discoveries Music Award.

== Career ==
Banza was born in Kinshasa. She began her music career at a young age. In early 2010, she moved to Kisangani, where she met people who helped her develop a taste for music, dance, acting, and cinematography. At age 15, she returned to Kinshasa to study musicology at the National Institute of Arts where she met her band mates. In 2017, Banza made a brief appearance on The Voice Afrique Francophone. In the process, she created her own group, "Banza Musik", and participated the following year in the exhibition "Kinshasa 2050. women first" before devoting herself to her new musical project. In 2019, she performed at Jazz Kif in Kinshasa and Brazzaville. She won the 2019 edition of the RFI Discovery Awards She was chosen from among the ten finalists for the quality of her melodies and her voice. Asalfo, Charlotte Dipanda, Tiken Jah Fakoly, Fally Ipupa, Josey, Angélique Kidjo, Youssou N’Dour, Oumou Sangaré and Singuila were part of this jury. She released her first single "Te Rembi" in 2019 and her first album will be released in 2020.

== Discography ==
=== Singles ===
Year	Songs
2019	Te Rembi
2019	Legigi No Gbi
2019	Mbi Gwe
2019	Mbi Lo
2019	Sur Le Pave
2019	Mbi Yemo
2019	Songo Te He
2020	Na Mileli

== Awards and nominations ==
Year	Nominee / work	Award	Result
2019	Céline Banza	Prix découvertes RFI 2019	Won

== See also ==
- Asalfo
- Angélique Kidjo
- The Voice Afrique Francophone
