= 1er Gaou =

Single by Magic System

from the album Premier Gaou
- B-side: "Remix"
- Released: 2002
- Recorded: 1999
- Genre: Zouglou
- Length: 3:26; 4:54 (album version)
- Label: Next Music
- Songwriter(s): Salif "A'Salfo" Traoré
- Producer(s): Angelo Kabila

Magic System singles chronology
"1er Gaou" (2002)	"On n'sait jamais" (2003)

"1er Gaou" is a song by Ivorian Zouglou artists Magic System, taken from the album of the same name. The title literally means "First Fool" in urban Abidjan slang called Nouchi. The song contains an autobiographical account of lead singer Salif "A'Salfo" Traoré about his ex-girlfriend who tried to hook up with him again when he became famous. Originally recorded in 1999, it became smash indie hit in France three years later. The song meant the breakthrough of little-known Magic System.

== Background ==
"1er Gaou" is based on autobiographical experiences of lead singer Salif "A'Salfo" Traoré. When he was an aspiring, poor artist, his girlfriend left him, but when he became a celebrity with Magic System, she tried to win him back, but Traoré turned her down. The song was first released in 1999 in their native Abidjan and was at first a hit in Ivory Coast and other African countries. When it was remixed in 2002 and released in France for Mélina Forthin, Magic System's song became a major indie hit there as well.

== Lyrics ==
The lyrics tell the story of an aspiring musician whose girlfriend leaves him because of his poverty. After he becomes rich and she sees him on TV, she tries to win him back. He turns her down, saying her leaving him does not really matter; only if he took her back he would become a "fool once more".

The lyrics feature a colorful patois of French-Ivorian slang. This is especially evident in the refrain of "Et on dit premier gaou n'est pas gaou oh / C'est deuxième gaou qui est niata oh (ah)" ("They say that the first fool is not a fool / It is the second fool who is a fool"), which expresses that his first folly (her leaving him) is not really a folly at all, only accepting her back would be.

== Music videos ==
There are two "1er Gaou" videoclips. The first one shows Magic System in their native Abidjan, with Traoré being left by his girlfriend at first before she comes back. This main plot line is interspersed by many scenes of daily life in Abidjan. In the second version, Magic System are in an expensive nightclub, again with Traoré left and then pursued by his girlfriend. This second version has a more posh look-and-feel than the first version.

== Chart performances ==
The single topped at number four on the French charts and remained in the top 100 for 28 weeks, ten of them in the top ten and sold as many as 300,000 copies in France. "It was the number which opened the way for us. Even if we have hit after hit, I don't think there's a hit which can replace Premier Gaou because Premier Gaou came with a novice magic," A'Salfo said later.

The single was also a top ten hit in Belgium (Wallonia), peaked at number ten in its ninth week, and appeared in the top 40 for 15 weeks. In Switzerland, the single had a moderate success, peaking at number 30 and staying in the top 100 for nine weeks.

== Track listings ==
- CD single
1. "1er Gaou" (original mix) (radio edit) — 3:04
2. "1er Gaou" (Bob Sinclar le bisou edit) — 3:26

== Charts ==
=== Peak positions ===
Chart (2002–03)	Peak position
Belgium (Ultratop 50 Wallonia)	10
Europe (Eurochart Hot 100)	15
France (SNEP)	4
Switzerland (Schweizer Hitparade)	30

Zimbabwe Power FM top hits number 5 was in the charts for 4 months

=== Year-end charts ===
Chart (2002)	Position
French Singles Chart	25
End of year chart (2003)	Position
Belgian (Wallonia) Singles Chart	49

Zimbabwe end of year chats 2002 number 46
