= Extra Musica =

Congolese musical band

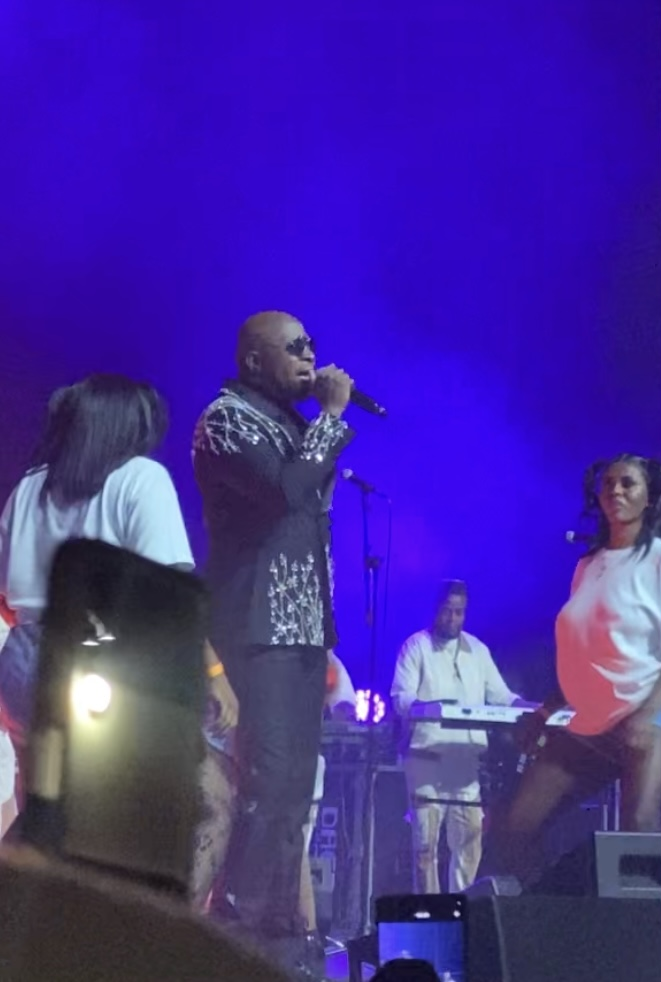
- Roga Roga performing with Extra Musica at the Zénith Paris on 1 February 2025

Background information
- Origin: Brazzaville, Republic of the Congo
- Genres: Congolese rumba; ndombolo
- Years active: 1993–present
- Labels: Declic Communication; Denide; SonoDisc; JPS; Sonima; Letiok; Ibroks

Extra Musica is a Congolese rumba band formed in Ouenzé, Brazzaville, in August 1993. The band was established by Roga-Roga, Espé Bass, Kila Mbongo, Durell Loemba, Guy-Guy Fall, Ramatoulaye Ngolali, and Quentin Moyascko, who initially met at the Sainte Thérèse church in Ouenzé, being neighbors and classmates. Prior to forming Extra Musica, several members had been associated with the Cogiex Stars ensemble but seceded subsequent to facing punitive repercussions for attempting to infuse new ideas.

In 1995, Extra Musica were spotted by Denide Production, which released their debut studio album, Les Nouveaux Missiles. The album was a commercial success, earning a gold record with sales exceeding 50,000 copies by April 1996 and introducing their first hit, "Freddy Nelson". Extra Musica's second studio album, Confirmation, debuted in December 1996, achieved considerable success in Africa. In 1997, the band released their third studio album, Ouragan. However, internecine dispute precipitated a schism in 1998, prompting Quentin Moyascko and several affiliates to establish Extra Musica International, whereas Roga-Roga and others remained as Extra Musica Zangul. Extra Musica, now rebranded as Extra Musica Zangul, released Etat-Major in December 1998, which emerged as their most successful record, which yielded their international stardom with sales surpassing 100,000 copies in France. Subsequent albums included Shalaï (1999), Trop c'est trop (2001), and Obligatoire (2004). In 2006, they released the double album La Main Noire. Bokoko was issued on 15 August 2021, with the eponymous single achieving continental acclaim. Their six-track EP Nzoungou, debuted on 20 August 2023.

Throughout their career, Extra Musica Zangul has accrued numerous accolades, including African Revelation of the Year at the Ngwomo Africa Awards in Kinshasa in 1996, Best African Group at the Africar Music Awards in Libreville in 1997, and Best African and Best Afro-Caribbean Group at the Africar Music Awards in 1998. They clinched the Best Group of Africa at the 2000 Kora Awards. In 2003, Extra Musica Zangul won the Best Central African Artist at Kundé and received Kora Awards' nominations for the Best Group of Africa in 2001 and 2008. In October 2011, they were honored as the Best African Group of the Decade (2001–2011) at Kundé.

== History ==
=== 1993–1995: Formation and debut album ===
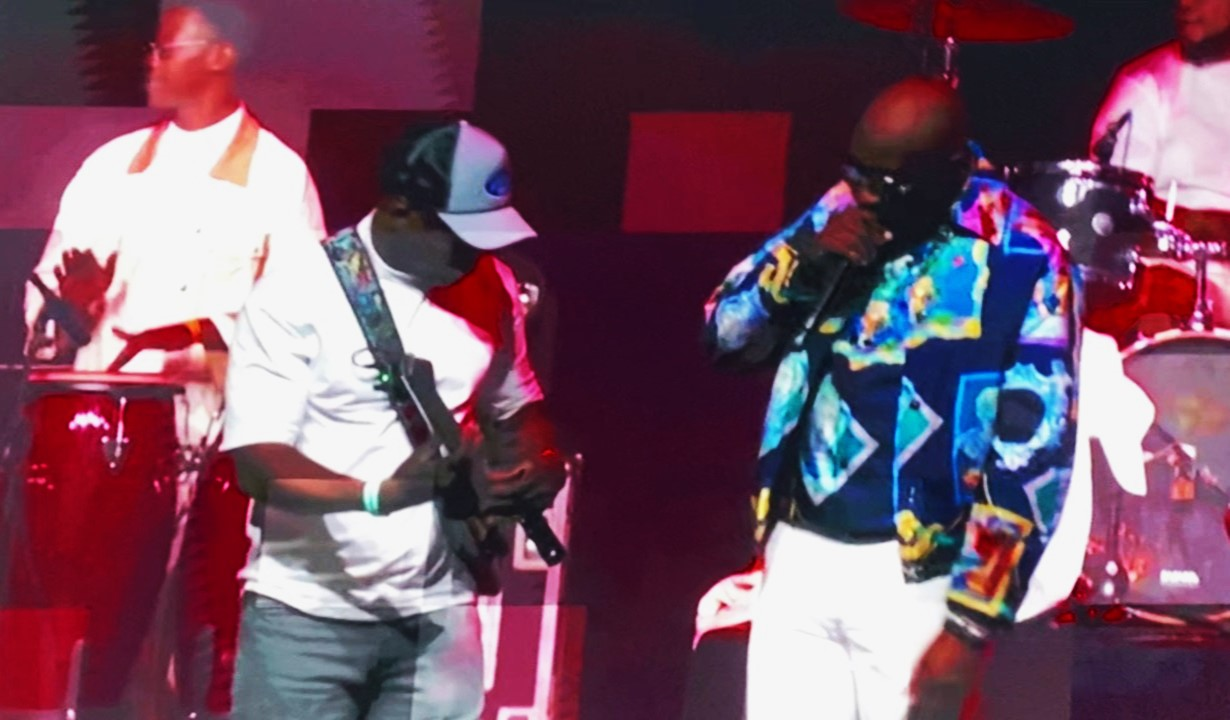
Espé Bass and Roga Roga performing with Extra Musica at Zénith Paris, 1 February 2025.

Extra Musica was established on 27 August 1993, by seven members, namely Roga-Roga, Espé Bass, Kila Mbongo, Durell Loemba, Guy-Guy Fall, Ramatoulaye Ngolali and Quentin Moyascko. The preponderance of the founding members converged at the Sainte Thérèse church in Ouenzé, while others were proximal neighbors or classmates. Prior to Extra Musica's establishment, Roga-Roga, Espé Bass, Kila Mbongo, Durell Loemba, and Quentin Moyascko were part of another group called Cogiex Stars. During their recreational intervals, they frequently performed at funerals and other local festivals, accompanied by the band's initial singers, Guy-Guy Fall and Régis Touba, the atalaku Kila Mbongo, and drummer Ramatoulaye. However, Roga, Espé, and Kila were reprimanded by the Cogiex Stars administration for attempting to introduce a new "ideology," leading to their departure from the group.

The name Extra Musica, chosen by Roga, was inspired by the positive reception they received from their elders following their performances, who told them they were "extraordinary". The band drew influence from musicians such as Tabu Ley Rochereau, Franco Luambo, Le Grand Kallé, Pamélo Mounk'a, Les Bantous de la Capitale, and Zaïko Langa Langa. In an expository dialogue with Pan African Music, Roga explained that Extra Musica blended the music of Zaïko and Empire Bakuba and incorporated elements of Le Grand Kallé's vocal style. The band gained recognition across both Congos through performances at events like Foire de Pointe-Noire and appearances on television programs like Variétés Samedi Soir, broadcast on Télé Zaire.

In 1995, Extra Musica seized the attention of the Denide Production label, which released their debut album, Les Nouveaux Missiles, on 15 December 1995. The track "Freddy Nelson," composed by Quentin Moyascko, became a substantial hit, earning Moyascko the eponymous sobriquet from the band's fandom. The record also included notable tracks such as "Na Ko Bala Yo Na Ko" by Oxy Oxygène, "Chagrin Plus Plus" by Pinochet Thierry, "Détresse" and "Dieu L'éternel" by Roga-Roga, and "Amie Reviens" by Durell Loemba.

Between 1994 and 1996, Extra Musica recruited several new members, including singers Abilissi, Doudou Copa, Malice Maria, Fédé Kanofa, and Herman Ngassaki, as well as rhythm guitarist and bassist Sonor Digital (who was present at the orchestra's inception), percussionists Émery Mbonda and Pozzi Gildas (the latter from Cogiex Stars), and keyboardist Christian Iyiangoua Kingstall.

=== 1996–1998: First success and split ===
Extra Musica's debut studio album, Les Nouveaux Missiles, achieved sales of over 50,000 copies in April 1996. The ensemble was also awarded the African Revelation of the Year accolade at the Ngwomo Africa Festival in Kinshasa.

In 1996, Extra Musica recorded their second studio album, Confirmation, at Studio IAD in Brazzaville. Initially planned to feature nine tracks, the album saw the removal of "Danny Danny" by Guy-Guy Fall and the inclusion of "Succès Extra", the flagship track by Roga-Roga. Following the mixing of tracks in Brussels, Confirmation was released, and the group went on a tour of Africa and later in Europe, performing in various halls and stadiums. During a tour in Mali in late 1996, Guy-Guy Fall was expelled from the group. On 8 February 1997, Extra Musica received the accolade for Best African Group at the Africar Music Awards in Libreville. On 20 February of the same year, Extra Musica performed at the Palais des Congrès in Abidjan, a 2,000-person venue filled by 4,500 people that day.

Extra Musica's third studio album, Ouragan, launched on 15 December 1997, was recorded in Paris at the Ferber studio. They subsequently recorded their next three albums there. Reviewing Ouragan, Affrisson characterized it as one of their "most accomplished albums with a breathtaking electro-sébéné soukouss beat, ndombolo and tchakou libondas..." The album's track "Hommage", a tribute to the victims of the Republic of the Congo Civil War, including Malice Maria and Fédé Kanofa, was one of the first songs in the band's repertoire.

In 1998, administrative discord precipitated Extra Musica's first split, leading to the creation of two factions: one with Quentin Moyascko, Durell Loemba, Régis Touba, and Pinochet Thierry, and another with Roga-Roga, Espé Bass, Kila Mbongo, and the remaining members. Despite attempts at reconciliation, tensions persisted, impacting the band's consistency in concert performances. In May 1998, Quentin and his faction departed to establish Extra Musica International.

=== 1998–2001: État-Major, Shalaï, Trop C'est Trop ===
Despite previous setbacks, Extra Musica, now rebranded as Extra Musica Zangul, persisted with their records. The band performed at the 1998 Sfinks Festival to a crowd of 45,000 people. Their ndombolo-infused fourth album, État-Major, released in December 1998, became a seminal classic, propelling them to increased international recognition. The album's eponymous hit single, uploaded to YouTube 19 years post-release, accrued over 26 million views before its removal. État-Major epitomized Extra Musica Zangul's distinctive sound, characterized by multi-thematic lyrics, catchy melodies, and distortion pedal guitar riffs. The album's success solidified their status as one of the most prominent Congolese bands, selling over 95,000 copies in France and leading to an extensive tour across Botswana, Togo, Mali, and Europe. Later, singers Papy Jah and Papy Bastin joined the band alongside the atalaku Arafat 2500 Volts from Extra Musica International.

In the summer of 1999, Extra Musica Zangul embarked on their first American tour. They headlined at venues such as the Irving Plaza. In the fall of 1999, the band recorded its fifth album, entitled Shalaï. It was released on 25 December 1999, and marked the last album featuring Kila Mbongo as an atalaku, citing personal obligations and internal discord. It was a predominant blend of soukouss and ndombolo. The album's critically acclaimed hit single, "Amnistie Shalaï", achieved great success and allowed Extra Musica Zangul to win the Best Group of Africa award at the Kora Awards on 18 November 2000 in Sun City. The song explored themes of love and peace. Reviewing for Agence d'Information d'Afrique Centrale, Durly-Émilia Gankama described "Amnistie Shalaï" as "beautiful lament" and that it "made the Congo proud and danced all generations".

Extra Musica Zangul commenced work on their sixth studio album, Trop c'est trop, in early 2001. During its production, they delivered a sold-out performance at Zénith de Paris on 10 February 2001, with guest performances by Papa Wemba, Jacob Desvarieux, Werrason and Fernand Mabala. Extra Musica later took part in the 3rd edition of the Pan-African Music Festival (Festival Panafricain de Musique; FESPAM) on 11 August 2001, hosted at the Palais du Parlement in Brazzaville. Following their performance at the festival, Extra Musica Zangul announced that Trop c'est trop was nearing completion and scheduled for release by year's end. Trop c'est trop was subsequently released in October 2001, following a Euro-African tour. The record achieved significant success across Africa, earning them a nomination at the Kora Awards for Best Video of Africa.

=== 2004–2010: Obligatoire, La Main Noire and band restructure ===
Following their performance at Celtel City amusement park in Ouenzé on 21 September 2002, Extra Musica Zangul announced their forthcoming seventh studio album, Obligatoire, during a concert in Mayotte. They began recording Obligatoire at Studio Eben Ezer in Brazzaville and later toured Paris to continue its production. In 2003, Extra Musica Zangul embarked on a tour in Burkina Faso, performing in cities including Ouagadougou, Koudougou, Ouahigouya, and Fada N'gourma. Later that year, they received the Kundé d'Or for Best Artist in Central Africa. Obligatoire was officially released in early 2004. In November 2004, vocalist Doudou Copa left the band. On 16 December, Oxy Oxygène, Papy Bastin, Kerson Saddam, and atalaku Typhoide Tarzan also left to form Universal Zangul. This prompted a restructuring within Extra Musica Zangul, including the enlistment of new recruits such as Kassoul Chalkidri and Dido Senga. Despite these changes, the band embarked on a two-month tour of southern Africa from 20 December 2004, performing in Malawi, Botswana, Zimbabwe, and Zambia. During the summer of 2005, Extra Musica Zangul performed at FESPAM. On 27 August 2005, the band celebrated their 12th anniversary with a VIP concert in Brazzaville. Singer Regis Touba rejoined the band. In February, Extra Musica Zangul managed a sold-out gig at Eboué stadium in Brazzaville, sharing the stage with Wenge Musica Maison Mère.

On 19 December 2006, they released a double album titled La Main Noire, which consisted of 12 tracks. In June 2007, the band sold-out the Yopougon Sports Complex in Ivory Coast with Zouglou band Espoir 2000 and DJ Ramatoulaye. According to the Ivorian newspaper Le Patriote, thousands of people were still outside the stadium. Extra Musica began their performance with their Congolese rumba and ndombolo-infused tracks, where they performed their old hits like "Etat-Major", "Shalaï" and "Trop c'est Trop". They subsequently played at the 6th edition of FESPAM in Brazzaville in July of that year.

In July 2008, Extra Musica Zangul received a nomination at the 10th edition of the Kora Awards for Best Group of Africa, which was later postponed to 4 April 2010. In August 2009, they performed at the 7th edition of FESPAM, sharing the stage with Wenge Musica Maison Mère, Banda Movimento, Ismalia, Ogb Musica, Harmonica, Lang'i, Cheb Karim, Pierrette Adams, and Ferré Gola, among others. They later performed at the 2010 Kora Awards ceremony alongside the Botswana group Dikakapa, Angolan singer Paul G, and Malian singer Kandet Kanté. Herman Ngassaki, Régis Touba, and Arafat 23500 Volts left the group. The band, now frequently referred to as Roga Roga and Extra Musica, welcomed new members, including Zaparo de Guerre, Youyou Mobangue, and États-Unis Charabia.

=== 2010–2017: Sorcellerie (Kindoki), Contentieux, Oyo Ekoya Eya ===
In 2010, Extra Musica performed a historic concert at the Palais de la Culture d'Abidjan with DJ Arafat as a featured guest. That same year, they guest-performed on Roga Roga's solo double album Sorcellerie (Kindoki), which included a collaboration with French rapper Passi. In December 2010, Extra Musica won the Kundé d'Or for Best Artist in Central Africa. On 14 May 2011, they took part in the 7th edition of the Festival Socioculturel de la Tshangu (Festsha) in Kinshasa alongside JB Mpiana, Werrason, and the Brazzaville-based groups Ayesa. On 28 October 2011, Extra Musica was awarded the Kundé d'Or for African Group of the Decade. They later performed again at the 8th edition of Festsha in May 2012 at Marché de la Liberté in the Masina commune.

In October 2012, the group performed in front of 80,000 people at the Stade des Martyrs during the Nuit de la Francophonie on the sidelines of the 14th Francophonie Summit. On 19 December 2013, Extra Musica was awarded the Sanzas de Mfoa for Special Prize. Their 20th-anniversary concert, initially slated for 21 December 2013, at Félix-Éboué stadium in Brazzaville, was canceled due to Nelson Mandela's death. Plans were later made to reunite all former and current members for a reconciliation concert organized by Jean-Rufin Omboumbou and Serge Mayembo, with Quentin Moyascko and Guy-Guy Fall reuniting for the Extra Musica Unity project. However, discord during the Extra Musica Unity concert at the Le Ruisseau Hotel in Pointe-Noire on 29 December led to audience dissatisfaction when Roga-Roga failed to perform with the group's former members as anticipated. In January 2014, Extra Musica embarked on a series of concerts in Brazzaville, Pointe-Noire, Dolisie, Owando, and across Africa and Europe to commemorate their 20th anniversary.

Roga-Roga's solo studio album, Contentieux, initially planned as a maxi-single and set for release on 15 July 2013, was postponed to enhance production quality. In an interview with Agence d'Information d'Afrique Centrale, Roga-Roga disclosed that an unnamed label had deferred the release date to 2015 for further production improvements, which resulted in further delays and ultimately being released on 14 January in Europe and 15 January in Africa of that year. Contentieux featured a guest appearance by Extra Musica and Jacques Koyo Chairman on the "Congolais Tika" track, which provided counsel to the Congolese populace, some of whom had adopted harmful habits. Earlier that year, Youyou Mobangue had exited the group to established his band Porte Na Porte.

On 31 December 2015, Roga-Roga's maxi-single Oyo Ekoya Eya was released, a follow-up to Contentieux, with five additional tracks added to the original list. Oyo Ekoya Eya featured significant contributions from Extra Musica on most tracks, including the eponymous standout single and "Lettre Au Président" (with Jacques Koyo). In an interview posted on the Agence d'Information d'Afrique Centrale website, Roga-Roga expressed that "Oyo Ekoya Eya" is a slogan to awaken young Congolese and Africans in general, advocating that fear is an impediment to progress. He further briefed the press that the group produced Oyo Ekoya Eya to offer advice, with "Lettre Au Président" aimed at denouncing the adverse developments in Congolese society. In February 2016, Roga-Roga and Extra Musica promoted Oyo Ekoya Eya with a concert at Cercle Mess Des Officiers in Brazzaville and later performed in Pointe-Noire for Valentine's Day. In March 2016, Roga-Roga and Extra Musica showcased Oyo Ekoya Eya at the Radisson Blu M'Bamou Palace Hotel in Brazzaville during an upscale concert. In November 2017, Extra Musica performed at the Bock Festival in Abidjan.

=== 2018–2019: 242 and second split ===
Roga-Roga performing at the 12th edition of the Festival Panafricain de Musique (FESPAM)

On 26 January, Extra Musica performed at Brazzaville's Institut Français du Congo (IFC) for the first time since 1996, following an invitation by Marie Audigier, the institution's deputy director, who hoped to promote cultural fusion. For the first time, the band performed with a Congolese violin orchestra, specially arranged for the event. During the show, Roga Roga announced their upcoming tenth studio album, titled 242, which was officially released on 16 March 2018. In an interview with Agence d'Information d'Afrique Centrale, Roga-Roga articulated that 242 retraces the "journey of Extra Musica" and accentuates the group's musical evolution from inception to the present. A 25th-anniversary tour was announced, with dates across Africa and a concert at the Palais des Congrès in Montreuil, Seine-Saint-Denis on 26 May and the Palais des Congrès in Brazzaville. However, during the Montreuil concert, just as Roga Roga stepped on stage, chaos broke out outside. A group known as the "combattants", opponents of then-President Joseph Kabila and his artist supporters, attempted to set fire to the venue's entrance by hurling gasoline cans, which ignited and shattered several windows from the intense heat. The attackers had emerged from nearby streets, managing to strike despite a heavy police presence, which included at least six vans from the French mobile gendarmerie.

On 21 June, the band performed again at IFC's Savorgnan Hall during the Fête de la Musique festival, this time without Roga Roga. In April 2019, Roga-Roga secured the Kundé d'Or for Best Artist in Central Africa. In December of that year, Extra Musica witnessed a significant internal split, with several members, including Sonor Digital and Ramatoulaye Ngolali, forming the group Extra Musica Nouvel Horizon.

=== 2020–present: Patati Patata, Bokoko, Stade Alphonse Massamba Débat, and Nzoungou ===
In early 2020, Extra Musica released the four-track Extended Play (EP) Patati Patata. The EP was a predominant blend of ndombolo and they later supported it with a mega concert at Village Chez Ntemba, in Kinshasa, on 3 October of that year.

On 15 August 2021, Extra Musica published the ndombolo-infused four-track EP Bokoko. The eponymous single rapidly became a hit in Kinshasa, where it was played in numerous bars and clubs and garnered prominence in Francophone and Anglophone African regions. It became their first breakout single to receive three consecutive awards, including the Kundé d'Or for Charismatic Leader of Central Africa in Burkina Faso, the Special Prize for disseminating African music globally at Primud in Ivory Coast, and the Francophonie Prize at Lokumu in the Democratic Republic of the Congo.

On 24 June 2023, Roga Roga and Extra Musica performed to a sold-out audience at the Stade Alphonse-Massamba-Débat, attracting 33,000 people (excluding those on the synthetic turf area). The concert was acclaimed by many critics as the "concert of the century." Bruno Okokana of Agence d'Information d'Afrique Centrale hailed the event as a "cultural revolution" and a "musical revolution".

The EP Nzoungou was released on 20 August 2023, featuring six singles: "Edo Mopatasse", "Toli", "Fatou Sako", "Jalousie", "Nzoungou Sans Dedicaces", and the eponymous "Nzoungou". On 19 May 2024, Roga Roga and Extra Musica headlined a sold-out show at the Casino de Paris.

== Awards and nominations ==
Year	Event	Prize	Recipient	Result	Ref.
1996	Ngwomo Africa Awards	Revelation of the Year in Africa	Extra Musica	Won	
1997	Palme d'Or	Best African Group	Extra Musica	Won	
1999	Tropic Music Awards	Best Group	Extra Musica	Won	
1999	Kora Awards	Best Group of Africa	Extra Musica	Nominated	
1999	Kora Awards	Best Music Video	"État-Major"	Nominated	
1999	Palme d'Or	Best African Group	Extra Musica	Won	
1999	Africar Music Awards	Best Afro-Caribbean Group	Extra Musica	Won	
2000	Kora Awards	Best Group of Africa	Extra Musica	Won	
2001	Kora Awards	Best Group of Africa	Extra Musica	Won	
2003	Kundé	Best African Group	Extra Musica	Won	
2008	Kora Awards	Best Group of Africa	Extra Musica	Nominated	
2010	Kundé	Best Artist in Central Africa	Extra Musica	Won	
2011	Kundé	Best Artist in Central Africa	Extra Musica	Won	
2014	Tam-Tam d'Or	Best Music Show	20th-anniversary concert	Won	
2015	Afroca Music Awards	Best Group	Extra Musica	Nominated	
2017	Tam-Tam d'Or	Best Orchestra of Typical Music	Extra Musica	Nominated	
2017	Tam-Tam d'Or	Best Album	Obligatoire	Nominated	
2017	Tam-Tam d'Or	Best Album	Sorcellerie (Kindoki)	Nominated	
2023	Kundé	Best Central African Artist	Extra Musica	Nominated	
2023	Trophée Mwana Mboka	Pool Malebo	Extra Musica	Won	
2023	Trophée Pool Malebo Music Awards	Best Orchestra	Extra Musica	Won	

== Discography ==
=== Albums ===
- Les Nouveaux Missiles (1995)
- Confirmation (1996)
- Ouragan (1997)
- État-Major (1998)
- Shalaï (1999)
- Trop C'Est Trop (2001)
- Obligatoire (2004)
- La Main Noire (2006)
- 242 (2018)

=== Extended Plays ===
- Patati Patata (2020)
- Bokoko (2021)
- Nzoungou (2023)
