= Dipanda =

Dipanda is a family name from Cameroon. It may refer to:

- Adrien Dipanda, born in 1988, a French handball player
- Charlotte Dipanda, born in 1985, an Afropop singer from Cameroon
- Aser Pierrick Dipanda Dicka, born in 1989, a Cameroonian professional footballer who plays in India
