= Mimi Fawaz =

Nigerian-Lebanese journalist

- Born: Nigeria
- Education: City University of London
- Occupations: Sports journalist, Sportswriter
- Employer(s): BBC World News, BBC Africa, BBC Sport. [Journalist intern CNN]

Mimi Fawaz is a Nigerian sports journalist, show host and presenter who currently works as a sports presenter on Focus on Africa, a BBC news programme broadcast on BBC World News alongside BBC Africa and BBC Sports. She has worked for CNN, ESPN and ITV Television networks. In January 2017, she hosted the 2016 GLO-CAF Awards alongside Nigerian actor Richard Mofe-Damijo.

== Early life and education ==
Mimi Fawaz was born in Nigeria and is originally from the Asaba, Delta State. She is a graduate of City University of London where she studied for a masters in journalism.

== Career ==
Fawaz started out as a journalist intern at CNN. She later went on to work at the ITN, ITV London and ITV News London platforms during which she interviewed the Sarah, Duchess of York. Whilst at ITV news she produced their coverage of the 2008 Champions League final between Manchester United and Chelsea which was played in Moscow, Russia.

Fawaz was the host, producer and presenter on London-based Pan-African TV channel Vox Africa TV's flagship show Sports 360. She was responsible for Vox Africa’s VoxLive and news anchor on VoxNews.

In 2013, whilst working at Vox Africa, Fawaz put together documentaries on Nelson Mandela’s legacy titled Mandela: A reflection on Robben Island which gave her the chance to visit the historic Robben Island. The documentary was aired on Vox Africa in May 2013.

Fawaz was given a role as a contributor on CNN for African football, where she would cover the Africa Cup of Nations on two occasions, the 2013 AFCON and 2015 FCON in South Africa and Equatorial Guinea. In April 2015, Fawaz was a moderator for the LSE Africa Summit at the London School of Economics for which Nigerian Vice-President, Yemi Osinbajo was a guest speaker. On 5 January 2017, she hosted the GLO-CAF Awards along with Nigerian actor Richard Mofe-Damijo (RMD). In May 2017, she covered the 67th FIFA congress in Manama, Bahrain and the following month in June 2017, the FIFA Confederations Cup in Russia for Kwese Sports.

Over the course of her career, Fawaz has interviewed several high-profile African personalities including the former President of Tanzania, Jakaya Kikwete, Namadi Sambo, former Nigerian Vice-President, Nigerian music duo P-Square and former African football players Kanu Nwankwo and Didier Drogba.

Fawaz has also worked as a freelancer for ESPN, in the process covering Wimbledon Championship and the US Open for the channel.

On 17 August 2021, Fawaz hosted the 2021 Africa Cup of Nations final draw along with Cameroon TV and radio personality Leonard Chatelain at Yaounde Conference Centre in Cameroon.

== Personal life ==
Fawaz speaks English and French fluently. She has been doing charity works, including supporting SOS Children's Villages with funds in putting up orphanages and other works in African countries.
