= Doudou Copa =

Republican Congolese singer (born 1974)

- Born: Bienvenu Dominique Elenga Laka; December 3, 1974 (age 51); Owando, Cuvette Department, Republic of the Congo
- Genres: Congolese rumba
- Occupations: Singer; dancer; songwriter; composer; bandleader
- Instruments: Vocals; guitar
- Years active: 1994–present

Bienvenu Dominique Elenga Laka (born 3 December 1974), known professionally as Doudou Copa, is a Congolese singer, songwriter, and composer. He is known for his contributions to the Congolese rumba genre and as a member of the musical group Extra Musica. Since transitioning to a solo career in the mid-2000s, he has released several albums and is known in the Central African music scene.

== Early life and career ==
=== 1974–1993: Childhood, seminary and music debut ===
Elenga Laka was born in Owando, in the Cuvette Department of the Republic of Congo. His mother, Marie Atipo, was formerly affiliated with the vocal group Les Jeunes Cousins. He developed an early interest in Congolese rumba and was influenced by artists such as Pamelo Mounk'a, Madilu System, Youlou Mabiala, and Koffi Olomide. He initially pursued religious studies with the intention of becoming a Catholic priest, earning the nickname "l’Abbé Doudou" during his time as a seminarian.

=== 1994–2004: Extra Musica ===
In 1994, Copa accepted an invitation from Guy-Guy Fall, a co-founder of Extra Musica, to join the group. Formed in 1993, Extra Musica was part of a new wave of youth Congolese bands. Copa joined as a backing vocalist and made his debut on the band’s first album, Les Nouveaux Missiles (1995). On Confirmation (1996), he performed his first solo vocal parts.

In 1997, Extra Musica released Ouragan. In June 1998, Extra Musica experienced a major split, with several key members—Quentin Moyascko, Régis Touba, Durell Loemba, and Pinochet Thierry—departing to form Extra Musica International. In December of the same year, the group released État-Major, where Copa contributed to the writing of "Écart."

Copa contributed to subsequent albums, including Shalaï (1999), where he composed "Zineba," and provided vocals for "Horizon 2000," a rumba piece composed by Roga Roga. He toured the United States, Canada, France, Belgium, and much of Africa with the band, including a concert at the Zenith Paris in February 2001. He then contributed to Trop c'est Trop (2001), which featured his slow rumba composition "Zongi Sanga." He also contributed lead vocals to several tracks, including "Gambala." His performance on this album earned him the "Meilleur chanteur de la République du Congo" award in 2002.

In 2004, tensions rose within Extra Musica, particularly between Copa and the band’s leader, Roga Roga. These disagreements culminated in Copa’s departure on 28 November 2004, after contributing to the group’s seventh album, Obligatoire, released that year. His final composition with the band was "L’Oublier," often referred to as "Gyrophare."

=== 2005–present: Solo career ===
==== 2005–2012: Échafaudage to Evolution ====
Copa began his solo career in 2005 by forming Groupe Doudou Copa, with musicians including Walo Boss Tino and Ben Mambriki. His debut album, Échafaudage (2005), featured collaborations with former Extra Musica colleagues. He also contributed to compilations including Il Fallait O'zala (2006) and Terre sacrée (2007), collaborating with other Congolese artists.

His second album, Independence Day (2007), received recognition at the Tam-Tam d’Or awards in 2008. His third album, Evolution (2010), released through Régis Production, received multiple nominations at the 2011 Tam-Tam d’Or awards.

==== 2013–present: Menu, Posso, imprisonment, resurgence ====
In 2013, Copa released Menu, his fourth studio album. The track list includes songs such as "Pondu Ya Limbondo" and "Madesu" written by the group’s conductor, Walo Boss Tino. Menu was awarded "Meilleur album de l'année" at the 9th Tam-Tam d’Or on 22 March 2014.

Beyond music, Copa has participated in social initiatives. In 2015, in partnership with the Family Health Department and the United Nations Population Fund (UNFPA), he released "La Fistule Stop," a song aimed at raising awareness about obstetric fistula. On 15 November 2016, he released his fifth album, Posso, through TPT Production.

On 15 February 2019, Copa released his sixth studio album, Loin des Barreaux, which includes the lead single "Cellule 128," written during his 2017 incarceration in France. The album was presented during a concert on 18 May 2019 at Espace Airtel City, Pointe-Noire. In November 2019, he was nominated in the first edition of the Pool Malebo Music Awards for "Meilleur Chanteur," which he won.

In 2020, Copa suffered a stroke that temporarily impaired his speech, leading to a pause in his career. After recovering, he resumed activity with the release of the EP Boloss (2021). In December 2023, he released "Nado Nado," the lead single from his forthcoming seventh album, Jerusalem. He also announced an EP titled Gauche-Droite for December 2024.

== Legal issues ==
In December 2017, Doudou Copa was sentenced to ten months in prison in Villepinte, France, for a domestic violence charge from 2010. A series of missed court appearances contributed to his arrest and detention. Following his release in mid-2018, he held a press conference in Brazzaville where he publicly apologized and announced a performance titled Doudou Chante La Femme. His experiences during incarceration informed the thematic content of his 2019 album Loin des Barreaux.

== Personal life ==
Elanga Laka is the father of three children.

== Discography ==
=== Studio albums ===
- Échafaudage (2005)
- Independence Day (2007)
- Evolution (2010)
- Menu (2013)
- Posso (2016)
- Loin des Barreaux (2019)

=== Extended-plays ===
- Boloss (2021)
- Gauche-Droite (TBA)
