= Le Roi du Ziglibithy =

Studio album by Ernesto Djédjé
- Released: 1977
- Genre: Ziglibithy
- Length: 70:54
- Label: P.a.M.
- Producer: Gbadamassi Raïmi

Ernesto Djédjé chronology
Ziboté	Le Roi du Ziglibithy	Tizere

Le Roi du Ziglibithy is one of Ivoirian singer Ernesto Djédjé's best known albums. It was released in 1977.

== Track listing ==
1. "Zadié Bobo" – 4:09
2. "Ziglibithiens" – 8:49
3. "Béhido" – 3:16
4. "Lola" – 4:41
5. "Gnizako" – 6:49
6. "Assouna" – 6:35
7. "Ziboté" – 5:50
8. "Loué Digben" – 3:43
9. "Azonadê" – 7:57
10. "Oyéno" – 5:29
11. "Dogbohoné" – 6:53
