= Abel Maxwell =

Senegalese singer-songwriter

Abel Maxwell is a singer-songwriter, author, and artist born in Dakar, Senegal that grew up in Europe and is now residing in Toronto. Abel's work has received the recognition from the International Association of Parliamentarians of La Francophonie (APF) - Assemblée parlementaire de la Francophonie, which awarded him the prestigious medal of the Ordre de la Pléiade.He has made significant contributions to the arts, education, and community development in Canada. Maxwell's work empowers others by sharing his experiences and fostering resilience and hope. He is on the distinguished list of the top 25 Canadian Immigrant Award winners for 2024.On March 20, 2024, the Lieutenant Governor of Ontario Edith Dumont, officially bestowed this honor on him, highlighting his significant impact on Canadian society and beyond..In January 2025, Abel Maxwell signs a distribution deal with Universal Music Africa..In May 2025, he receives the King Charles III Coronation Medal, a distinction for his significant contributions and public service..Toronto-based artist and entrepreneur Abel Maxwell ran for president of the Assemblée de la francophonie de l'Ontario (AFO) in the election held on October 24, 2026. His vision is to bring the AFO closer to young Francophones (who represent a large part of the cultural diversity) and to promote the arts, culture, and community roots.His top priorities are the integration and retention of Francophone newcomers (particularly the rapid recognition of credentials and access to employment), as well as increased funding for Franco-Ontarian culture.

== Biography ==
Abel Maxwell was born to parents of Togolese descent. From an early age, he was interested in music. At the age of seven, he joined the conservatory to learn the piano.

In 2003, he founded a gospel choir in Lyon, France.

In 2008, he released his first album, Abel Maxwell under the French record Alter Ego Music .

In 2015, his second album, Interludes, was released. In the following year, he released another music album, named Rupture, both under the Canadian record label BODB Entertainment .

In February 2020, he released his fourth album, Contradictions and presented it for the 1st time at The Alliance française de Toronto to a crowd of media personalities and influential leaders of the GTA, the Greater Toronto Area.

In February 2023, he released his fifth album “5 Roses” at the Université de l’Ontario français in front of people of influence, notable media professionals covering local and international news residing in Ontario, New Brunswick and West Africa.

In June 2026, he released the Single " Demain" and his new EP "Maxwell Jazz Club Pt.1" under The Universal Music Group and Wiser.

== Discography ==
=== Albums ===
- Abel Maxwell (2008)
- Interludes (2015)
- Rupture (2016)
- Contradictions (2020)
- 5 Roses (2023)
- Maxwell Jazz Club Pt.1 (2026)
