= Rolande Kammogne =

Rolande Kammogne (born May 31, 1982) is a Cameroonian entrepreneur and television producer. She is the founder of the pan-African TV channel VoxAfrica and producer of The Voice Afrique Francophone.

== Early life ==
Rolande is the daughter of Paul Fokam, a Cameroonian entrepreneur. She was born on May 31, 1982. In 2004, she graduated with a degree in mathematics, statistics and management systems from Columbia University in the United States. She wrote a thesis on the need for the creation of a media that would connect all the black diasporas of the world. Upon leaving school, she accepted an internship at Killer Films where she worked alongside Christine Vachon.

== Career ==
In 2006, with a team of analysts, she prepared the business plan for the creation of a pan-African television channel. In September 2007, she moved to London to realize the project.

=== VoxAfrica ===
In January 2008, the first pan-African, bilingual and independent television channel, VoxAfrica, took its first steps on the Internet at the African Nations Cup in Ghana. In May 2008, the channel broadcast its first signal, now available in Africa via satellite. VoxAfrica launched its UK version in May 2010 In London. From 2012 to 2015, VoxAfrica UK won best Afro channel in the United Kingdom. In 2015, VoxAfrica secured the rights for the most successful television franchise in the world, The Voice. In 2016, the channel launched the first season of The Voice Afrique Francophone in 17 countries in Africa, which is to date the largest television show produced in French-speaking Africa.
