= Dena Mwana =

Congolese singer (born 1986)

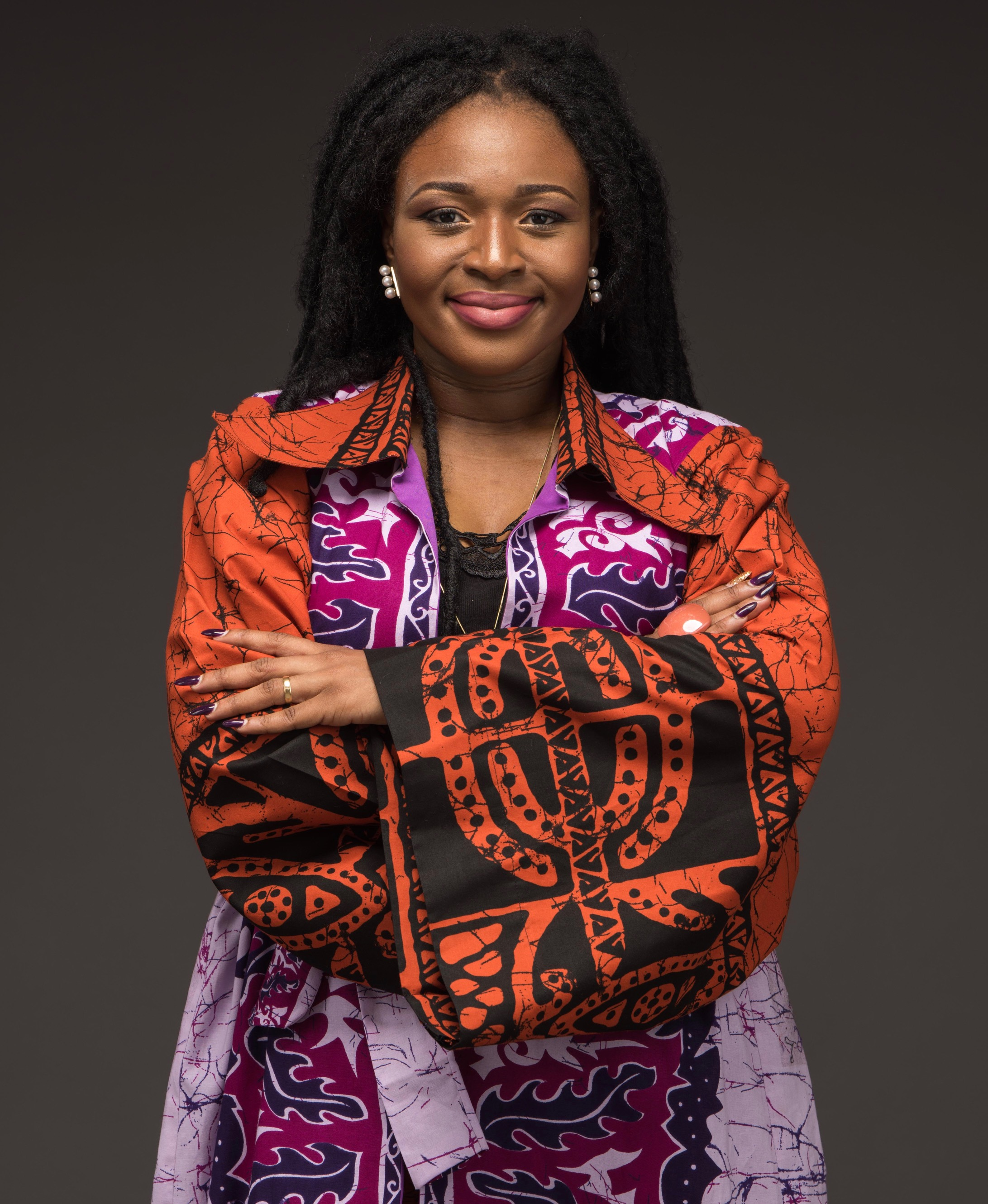

Background information
- Born: Denise Mwanakitata Muwayi; 27 December 1986 (age 39); Kinshasa, Zaire
- Genres: Gospel; Congolese music; Soul music
- Instrument: Voice
- Years active: 2011-present
- Labels: Happy People Africa, Motown Gospel Africa, Universal Music Africa
- Website: https://happypeople.africa/artiste/dena-mwana/

Dena Mwana is a gospel singer and composer originally from the Democratic Republic of the Congo (DRC).

Nominated several times and awarded at the African Gospel Music & Media Awards in 2013 and 2019 in London, she has shared the stage with several renowned artists and has already performed more than two hundred performances in more than 16 countries in the world. Today, she is considered a reference in French-speaking gospel music.

Mwana is signed to Motown Gospel Africa, an American gospel music recording label based in Africa under the Universal Music Group record company through its African subsidiary Universal Music Africa. In July 2025, Mwana was ranked fourth on Billboard France's chart of the most-streamed Congolese artists in France, limited to those who began their careers in either the DRC or the Republic of the Congo.

== Early life ==
Mwana was born on December 27, 1986, in Kinshasa, Zaire; her name at birth was Denise Mwanakitata Muwayi. She is the sixth child, from a family of eight children. Mwana began singing in public as part of a church choir, "Notre dame de Grâce", in Kinshasa at the age of 13 and she was their music director by the age of 18. In 1998, the choir rose to prominence over a patriotic hymn, which was copied by schools across the DRC, making her vocal style well-known across the country.

== Career ==
In 2003, the professor of Music at the National Institute of the Arts, Rigobert Mbila, suggested that Mwana set up her own singing group. By 2004, her first band, Acapella Thematic Musical Group, was born.

In 2006, Mwana emigrated to the United States to pursue a career in gospel music, settling in Virginia. From 2008, Mwana decided to split her time between the US and the DRC, joining the Philadelphia Mission Choir in Kinshasa as cantor. Her Christian faith is central to her singing, compositions and performance.

In 2013, she became the first artist of the Happy People label, and in 2019 she was signed by Motown Gospel Africa a record label of the major Universal Music Group. She sings in French, English and Lingala.

=== Discography ===
- Hosanna (2011)
- Monene (2016)
- Souffle(2020)
- 2Daddy (E.P) [2024]

And several singles, which include:

- "L'Eternel est Bon" (2012)
- "Se-Yo" (2014)
- "Saint Esprit" (2018)
- "Souffle” (2019)
- "Maintenant Seigneur [feat. Dan Luiten]" (2020)
- "Si La mer Se Dechaine (remix) [feat. Soweto Gospel Choir]" (2020)
- "Fade Away, Limoblaze [feat. Dena Mwana]" (2021)
- "Never Leave Me, CallOut Music [feat. Dena Mwana]" (2021)
- "Une Armée" (2022)
- "Lindanda, Na Na Na" (2022)
- "Another Miracle" (feat Ada Ehi) (2023)
- "Affranchis, Bana Nzambe" (feat. Glorya Reliques) [2024]
- "Jamais Sans Lui" (2024)

=== Performances ===
Mwana's voice has led her to perform in more than twenty countries around the world. Some of those places include:

- Mohammed V National Theatre in Rabat, Morocco (2019)
- Hotel La Falaise in Yaoundé, Cameroon (2019)
- Fragrance of Worship in Bujumbura, Burundi (2018)
- Grand Théâtre in Dakar, Senegal (2017)
- Palais des Congrès d'Issy-Les-Moulinneaux in Paris (2019)
- Concert Dena Mwana - Sofitel Hotel Ivoire & Stade Heden Gold Hotel in Abidjan (2020)
- Concert Motown Gospel Dena Mwana - Sofitel Hotel Ivoire & Stade Heden Gold Hotel in Abidjan (2021)
- Concert Christmas Dena Mwana au Canal Olympia de Douala Cameroun (2021)
- Gospel Music in Gabon at Pentecost (2022)
- Dena Mwana au Jesus Festival à Paray Le Monial, France (2023)
- Dena Mwana Concert at Reunion Island (2023)
- Dena Mwana Concert at Mauritius Island (2023)
- 2Daddy Europ Tour (Lille, Koln, Berlin, Bordeaux, Lyon, Paris & Brussels) [2024]

== Awards ==
- 2013 - AGMA winner - Central African Artiste of Excellence
- 2016 - Etando Award: Art & Culture (2016)
- 2019 - AGMA Winner - Central African Artiste of Excellence

== Family ==
Dena Mwana is married to her manager and founder of HappyPeople record label, Mr Michel Mutahali and they have three children: two boys and a girl.
