= Didi B =

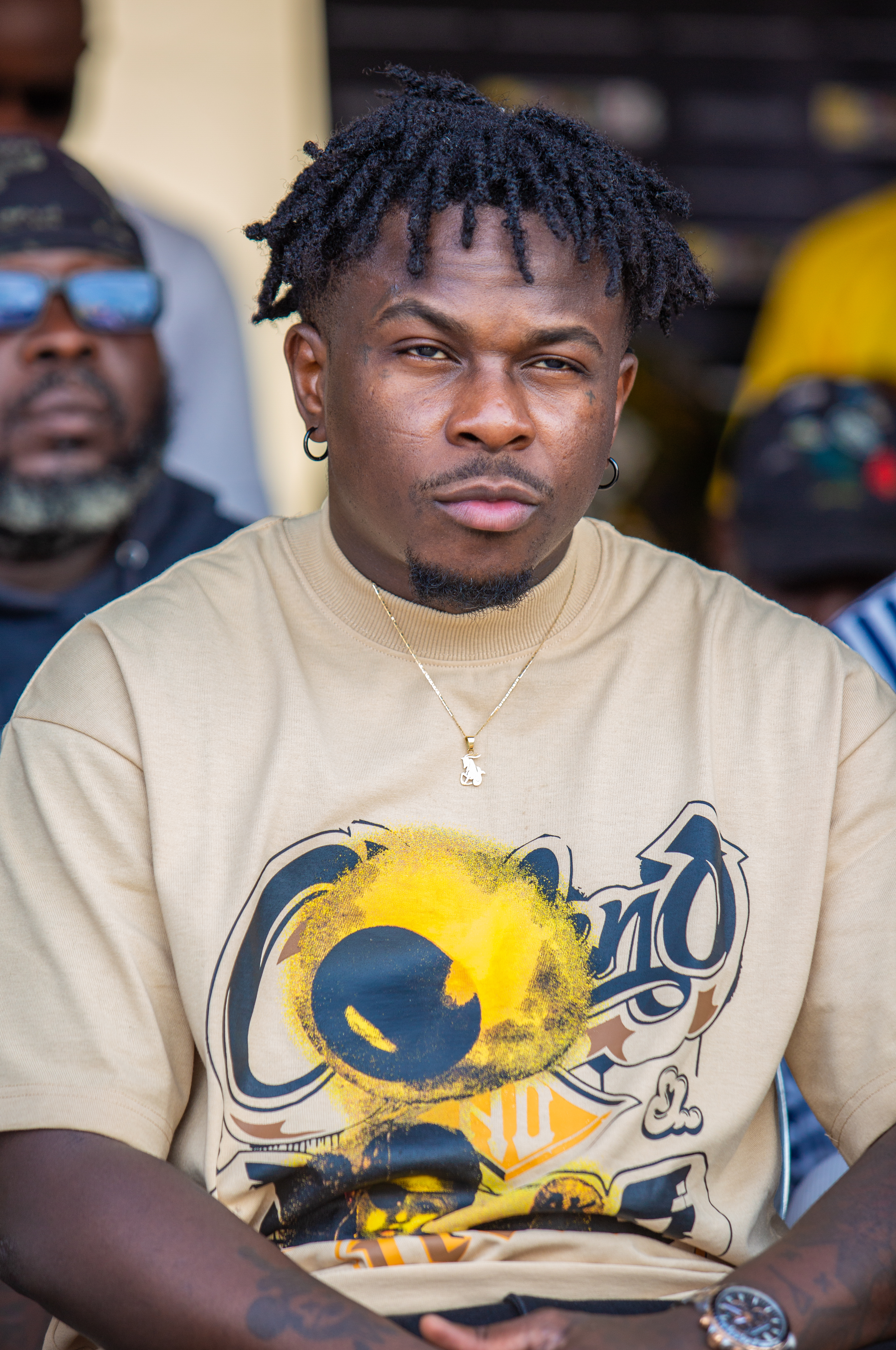

Background information
- Also known as: Babi Style
- Born: Bassa Zéréhoué Diyilem; 3 April 1992 (age 34); Abidjan, Ivory Coast
- Genres: hip hop; Afropop; Ivorian hip-hop; variety music
- Occupations: Singer, Rapper, Actor
- Years active: 2009–
- Labels: Universal Music Group (2017–2022); Africa Mindset; 92i Africa
- Website: mojavel.com

Bassa Diyilem known by his stage name Didi B and Babi Style, (born 3 April 1992) is an Ivorian rapper, singer, composer, dancer and actor. He has released several songs including five albums.

== Early life and career ==
Bassa Zéréhoué Diyilem was born on April 3, 1992, in the village of Ki-Yi in Abidjan, established by Cameroonian writer Werewere Liking as an artistic hub and training center for the education of young people; to parents who were involved in music. His father, Abou Bassa Bomou, a Gagu is a pianist, actor, and arranger, while his late mother, Péhoula Zéréhoué, was a choreographer and dancer of the Guéré ethnicity.

At the age of three, he made his stage debut in Meiway's music video "Death Society" who then invited him to participate in two other videos, "Ahissan" and "Le Dernier Siècle".

== Career ==
=== Actor ===
At the age of 10, Didi B was approached by artist Paul Madys to play the lead role in his music video for his song "ARRETEZ", marking his entry into the world of cinema. He subsequently landed a role in a television series produced by UNICEF.

In 2006, at the age of thirteen, he secured the lead role in the film Les Frères Kadogo (The Kadogo Brothers) by Rwandan director Joseph Muganga, assisted by Henri Duparc. The film won the Best Fiction Award, the Grand Prix TV-Video at FESPACO, and the Best Medium-Length Film Award in the Digital Africa section at Vues d'Afrique in 2007. The success of this movie led to his meeting with Ivorian music producer Laurent Gbagbo.

=== In music ===
In 2009, Didi B formed the rap group Kiff No Beat along with some of his cousins. In 2013, Didi B released his first solo album, "Mojo Trone Vol. 1", still remaining with the group.

In 2017, Kiff No Beat became the first African hip-hop group to be signed by Universal Music.

In 2021, Didi B signed several partnership contracts with brands such as Fresh Pressea, Johnnie Walker, and Budweiser. He also signed with the Ivorian label Coast to Coast and 92i. Didi B also launched an organization named Africa Mindset.

In 2022, Didi B rose into prominence with the release of his first solo album, "Mojotrône II: History", co-produced by Coast to Coast and 92i, after his group Kiff No Beat decided to pursue solo careers but collaborate on tracks or albums later. This album garnered over 50 million streams and sold over 5,000 CDs, certified by BURIDA, Dream Makers, and the APRODEMCI. To mark the album's release, Didi B performed two concerts within four months at the Palais de la Culture on May 27 and August 27, 2022, followed by other concerts including one in Guinea at the Stade General Lansana Conté and another solo concert in Paris at the Elysée Montmartre on February 4, 2023.

His single "En Haut", released on August 20, 2022, was the result of a collaboration between the artists Tam Sir and Jr La mélo. In 2023, the single "En Haut" held the record for his most-streamed track on the music streaming platform Boomplay, reaching a total of 16 million streams.

In 2023, he featured rapper Dadju in his single "L'argent" and French rapper franglish in "S'envolement". In 2024 he released the single "Travailler" featuring Serge Ibaka and featured French rapper Mohammad Sylla in his track "DX3 (Dégâts X3)".

In 2025, he released his second solo album called "Bazarhoff & Diyilem", which went platinum in less than five months.

== Legacy ==
Didi B won several awards in 2022, notably at the PRIMUD awards where he won the Best Francophone Artist. He also received the Song of the Year award at the AFRIMA awards in Dakar.

In July 2023, he received a gold record for "Mojotrône II: History" from JM production.

He is the only Ivorian rapper to have filled the Felix Houphouet Boigny Stadium (over 30,000 seats) for a concert, and subsequently the Stade Bouaké. He also holds a diamond record for his album "Mojotrone II: History" and more than 10 gold and platinum singles.

== Collaboration ==
Since May 26, 2021, Didi B has signed with 92i Africa, the African branch of French rapper Booba's label 92i, founded in 2021.

== Personal life ==
Didi B is Muslim. He is married to Sarai Dhologne following a marriage proposal during a concert. They have a daughter.

== Discography ==
=== Studio albums ===
- Mojo Trône, Vol. 1 (2013)
- Mojotrône II: History (2022)
- Before Olympia (2023)
- Diyilem & Bazarhoff: Genius (2025)
- Juventus Nueva Era (2026)

=== Singles ===
2022

- Tala
- En Haut (with Tim Sir and Jr La mélo)

2023

- Shogun
- Trophy Room
- Aïcha (feat Miedjia)
- L'argent (feat Dadju)
- S'envolement ( feat franglish)
- Disque de Gouel
- Aladji Toutouya

2024

- Travailler (feat Serge Ibaka)
- J'adore (feat Miedjia)
- DX3 (Dégats ×3) (feat MHD)

2025

- GO
- Holiday Season (feat Zinoleesky)
- Good vibes
- RODELA (feat Sindika)

== Filmography ==
- Death Society (Meiway music video, 1995)
- Ahissan (Meiway music video)
- Le Dernier Siècle (Meiway music video)
- ARRETEZ (Paul Madys music video)
- Les Frères Kadogo (Joseph Muganga, 2006 movie)

== Awards ==
Event	Award	Date	Ref
Primud d'or 2022	Best Album of the Year	7 November 2022	
Primud d'or 2022	Best Artiste "Ivorian Rap"	7 November 2022	
Primud d'or 2022	Hit of the Year	7 November 2022	
AFRIMA	Song of the Year Award, "Tala"	15 January 2023 in Dakar	
Africa Talent Awards	Best album, "Mojotrône: History"	28 January 2023	
Africa Talent Awards	Best African Artiste	28 January 2023	
Africa Talent Awards	Song of the Year, "Tala"	28 January 2023	
Africa Talent Awards	Best Records and Intercontinental Song of the Year, "Tala"	28 January 2023	
Kundé d'Or 2023	Kundé Best Artist of West Africa	12 May 2023	
JM PRODUCTION	Gold Certification for "Mojotrône II"	2023	
TRACE Awards	Best Francophone Artiste	2023	
Primud d'or 2023	PRIMUD D'or	19 November 2023	
Primud 2024	Primus d'or	10 November 2024	
TRACE Awards 2025	Best Hip-hop Artiste	27 February 2025	
APRODEMCI	Diamond Certification for "Mojotrône II"	May 2025	
APRODEMCI	Platinum Certification for Album "Diyilem & Bazarhof"	May 2025	
AMC & APRODEMCI	Platinum Certification for Album "Mojotrône II"	May 2025	
