= Zoblazo =

Ivorian music genre

- Stylistic origins: dance music, zouk
- Cultural origins: 1990s Côte d'Ivoire
- Typical instruments: Varies

Regional scenes
- Côte d'Ivoire

Local scenes
- Abidjan

Zoblazo is a musical style from Abidjan, Côte d'Ivoire, created in the early 1990s. It is a cosmopolitan popular dance music with simple up-tempo rhythm and high tech instrumentation and contains a mixture of traditional dance rhythms from southern Côte d'Ivoire.

Zoblazo's best known exponent is Freddy Meiway, who has released a series of Zoblazo records starting in 1989 with the record "Ayibebou" with his group Zo Gang. An ethnic N'Zema from Grand Bassam, Meiway integrated folk rhythms from Côte d'Ivoire and Ghana with and is danced to with a white handkerchief. From his second album in 1990 entitled 200% Zoblazo, Meiway became the second best known Ivorian and N'zema musician after Alpha Blondy, and has released a steady stream of records, the most recent 9ème commandement –900% zoblazo released in 2007.
