= Universal Music Africa =

Universal Music Group Africa
- Industry: Music
- Founded: 2018
- Headquarters: Green Buro, Abidjan, Côte d'Ivoire
- Area served: Côte d'Ivoire, Cameroon, Nigeria, Senegal, Benin, Burkina Faso, Burundi, Cabo Verde, Central African Republic, Chad, Comoros, Democratic Republic of the Congo, Djibouti, Equatorial Guinea, Gabon, Guinea, Guinea-Bissau, Madagascar, Mali, Niger, Sao Tome and Principe, Senegal, Seychelles, Togo, South Africa
- Key people: Franck Kacou (GM.)
- Services: Music publishing
- Owner: Universal Music France
- Parent: Universal Music Group
- Divisions: U-Live Africa; Motown Gospel Africa; Def Jam Recordings Africa; Universal Music Nigeria; Universal Music South Africa
- Subsidiaries: Blue Note Records Africa; Virgin Music Africa
- Website: umgsa.africa

Universal Music Africa (UMA) is a multilingual music corporation of the global record label Universal Music Group, covering 25 French, Spanish, and Portuguese-speaking countries, in Africa, with its corporate headquarters located in Abidjan, Côte d'Ivoire. Universal Music Africa is known for housing Motown Gospel Africa, Blue Note Records Africa, and Def Jam Recordings Africa.

== History ==
Universal Music Africa was founded on 11 July 2018, as the largest African division of Universal Music Group, operating in Côte d'Ivoire, Cameroon, Nigeria, Senegal, Benin, Burkina Faso, Burundi, Cabo Verde, Central African Republic, Chad, Comoros, Congo, Djibouti, Equatorial Guinea, Gabon, Guinea, Guinea-Bissau, Madagascar, Mali, Niger, Sao Tome and Principe, Senegal, Ghana, Seychelles, Togo, and South Africa. In 2018, Universal Music Group, appoints Moussa Soumbounou, as the managing director, and Olivier Nusse, the CEO of Universal Music France, was appointed as the veteran executive, artist manager, and live promoter.

Following the launch, Universal Music Africa (marketed as Universal Music Group Africa), kicked off with Kiff No Beat, DJ Arafat, Toofan, Locko, and Ténor, as its first recording artist. On 11 April 2018, Mr Eazi Banku Music, signed a licensing deal with Universal Music Group Africa, in conjunction with Universal Music South Africa, to distribute Life is Eazi, Vol. 2 - Lagos to London in Africa. On 17 June 2019, Charlotte Dipanda, Mink's, Magasco, Pit Baccardi, and Mimie, joins Universal Music Group Africa artist roaster.

On 30 August 2019, Yemi Alade, released her fourth studio album Woman of Steel, through Universal Music Africa, and Effyzzie Music Group. On September 9, 2019, she signed a licensing deal with Universal Music Africa, in partnership with Universal Music France. On 13 January 2020, Universal Music Group, promotes Franck-Alcide Kacou, as the general manager of Universal Music Group Africa. On 16 May 2020, UMA, host The Africa at Home, virtual concert, with guess performances from Yemi Alade, Magic System, Serge Beynaud, Vegedream, Kiff No Beat, Fally Ipupa, Singuila, Hiro, Toofan, Locko, Didier Awadi, Salif Keita, Angélique Kidjo, and Patience Dabany.

On 4 January 2021, UMG appoints its key Executive in Africa. Sipho Dlamini, and Elouise Kelly was named CEO and COO of Sub-Saharan Africa, and Universal Music South Africa, while Sipho Dlamini continues to report to Adam Granite, UMG's EVP, Market Development, to identify further opportunities for artists signed to Universal Music Africa, and continues to oversee all of UMG's operations within English-speaking Africa countries. Chinedu Okeke was named managing director of Universal Music Group Nigeria. On 7 June 2022, Virgin Music Label & Artist Services launched its flagship in Africa, through UMA as Virgin Music Label & Artist Services Africa (also known as Virgin Music Africa).

=== U-Live Africa ===
In 2018, UMA launched U-Live Africa, a flagship of U-Live, and a division of UMG. U-Live Africa is an event promoter, producer, and investor in live entertainment in Africa. On 5 October 2018, Major Lazer "Soundsystem Live tour Africa tour" in Nigeria, was produced by U-Live Africa, at Hard Rock Beach, Victoria Island, Lagos. In 2018, Adekunle Gold’s three-night residency at Terra Kulture, from 13 to 15 December. On 17 July 2020, Fally Ipupa partnered with U-Live Africa. According to Fally Ipupa "this announcement is accompanied by an African tour from November 2020 to January 2021. A dozen dates are planned between Ivory Coast, Cameroon, Gabon, and Liberia at the top of the list".

=== Blue Note Africa ===
On 6 April 2022, Blue Note Records, and Universal Music Group Africa, established Blue Note Africa (marketed as Blue Note Records Africa), to sign Jazz artists from across the African continent. According to UMA, CEO, Sipho Dlamini, "The opportunity to create Blue Note Africa and provide a channel for African Jazz talent to have a home in the U.S., with a dedicated and passionate team led by a legend in his own right – Don Was, is very exciting. We can now walk the African Jazz journey, from Cape to Cairo to California".

== Partnerships ==
=== Boomplay Music ===
On 5 November 2018, Universal Music Group announced a multi-year distribution deal with Boomplay, an African music digital download and streaming service, in ten Africa countries. On 17 March 2021, Universal Music Group signed an expanded licensing deal to enable Boomplay Music to stream Universal Music Africa's music catalog.

=== ONOMO Hotels Group ===
On 2 December 2020, ONOMO Hotels Group, signed a strategic partnership with Universal Music Africa, in conjunction with ONOMO Africa's Finest Live, an initiative to promote and support African arts, African music, and African cuisine. Right after the government announced that entertainment, events, exhibitions and cultural shows will resume in line with COVID-19 preventive measures, on 10 December 2020, Onomo hotel launched a new restaurant and lounge called "iJURU", with live music curated by Universal Music Africa.

=== Tallac Records ===
On 13 July 2021, Booba "Tallac Records", signed a strategic partnership with Universal Music Africa. According to Universal Music Africa, the exclusive deal will see Booba's entire catalog, spanning 10 albums and almost two decades, available for the first time across the continent and will also include future releases. The deal also marks the launch of 92i Africa, a new division of Booba "92 I brand", in partnership with Universal Music Africa (UMA) and Universal Music France (UMF).

=== TBI Publishing S.A. ===
On 12 October 2021, Youssou N'Dour "TBI Publishing S.A.", signed a multi-year, exclusive partnership with UMA. According to Franck Kacou, "His incomparable voice is a strong symbol of the direction we have taken over the past couple of years with UMA, establishing the company as a true home for African artists and music, and a bridge to audiences around the world through our network of labels". According to UMG, "The partnership will begin with the surprise release of a new album on November 12th, 2021".

== Artists ==
Recording artists, and producers, signed to Universal Music Africa includes:

- Locko
- Rophnan
- Ténor
- DJ Arafat
- Singuila
- Vegedream
- Dena Mwana
- Toofan
- Youssou N'Dour
- Yemi Alade
- Booba
- Sauti Sol
- Charlotte Dipanda
- Magic System
- Mink's
- Magasco
- Pit Baccardi
- Mimie
- Kiff No Beat
- Mr Eazi
- Zainhy(99Loner)

== Selected discography ==
=== Singles ===
`List of singles released by artists signed to Universal Music Africa
Artist	Title	Year	Album	Release date
Locko	"Hein Hein Hein"	2018	Cloud Nine	31 May 2019
Ténor	"ONPP"	2018	Non-album single	
Ténor	"Kaba Ngondo"	2018	Non-album single	
Ténor	"Do Le Dab"	2018	Non-album single	
Ténor	"Bahatland"	2018	Non-album single	
Ténor	"Bad Things"	2018	Non-album single	
Ténor	"Alain parfait (A L'imparfait)"	2018	On finit	7 August 2019
DJ Arafat	"Dosabado"	2018	Renaissance	28 December 2018
DJ Arafat	"Pandou Koule"	2018	Non-album single	
Toofan	"Money"	2018	Conquistadors	31 August 2018
Toofan	Affairage	2018	Conquistadors	31 August 2018
Locko	"Let Go"	2019	Cloud Nine	31 May 2019
Locko	"Katana"	2019	Cloud Nine	31 May 2019
Ténor	"Besoin de sourire"	2019	Non-album single	
Ténor	"J'aime pas"	2019	Non-album single	
Ténor	"Speedy"	2019	Non-album single	
Ténor	"C'est bon"	2019	Non-album single	
DJ Arafat	"Lékilé"	2019	Non-album single	
DJ Arafat	"Moto Moto"	2019	Non-album single	
DJ Arafat	"Maman"	2019	Non-album single	
Singuila	"La femme de quelqu'un"	2019	Docteur Love	12 February 2021
Mimie	"Ten Ten"	2019	TBA	
Sauti Sol	Extravaganza	2019	Non-album single	
Toofan	"Panenka"	2019	Non-album single	
Toofan	"Ye Mama"	2020	Non-album single	
Locko	"Mêmes mêmes choses"	2020	Locked Up	22 May 2020
Locko	"Au mariage de ma go"	2020	TBA	
Ténor	"Ils ne savent pas"	2020	TBA	
Ténor	"Ce que je veux"	2020	TBA	
Ténor	"Immortalité (Hommage à Dj Arafat)"	2020	TBA	
Ténor	"Comme d'habitude"	2020	TBA	
Ténor	"Cypher"	2020	TBA	
Ténor	"Vitres teintées"	2020	TBA	
Ténor	"Salauds"	2020	TBA	
Singuila	"Belle"	2020	Docteur Love	12 February 2021
Singuila	"Les gars"	2020	Docteur Love	12 February 2021
Singuila	"Dans la cage du rossignol (Episode 9: La voisine)"	2020	Nono-album single	
Singuila	"Boniments"	2020	Nono-album single	
DJ Arafat	"Kong"	2020	TBA	
DJ Arafat	"Péter les plombs (Remix)"	2020	TBA	
Yemi Alade	"Boyz"	2020	Empress	20 November 2020
Yemi Alade	"True Love"	2020	Empress	20 November 2020
Charlotte Dipanda	"Quand tu n'es pas là"	2020	CD	26 February 2021
Charlotte Dipanda	"Coeur en cage"	2020	CD	26 February 2021
DJ Arafat	"Péter les plombs"	2021	TBA	
Mimie	"Faya"	2021	TBA	
Locko	"Voyage"	2021	Era	17 December 2021
Locko	"Indécis ( NDC )"	2021	Era	17 December 2021
Locko	"Hein Hein Hein (Kimbo Remix)"	2021	Non-album single	
Singuila	"Les étoiles sont alignées"	2021	TBA	
Singuila	"Statut"	2021	TBA	
Toofan	"Gbokirigbo"	2021	TBA	
Toofan	"Goumin Fracas"	2021	TBA	
Toofan	"Ona"	2021	TBA	
Booba	"Mona Lisa"	2021	ULTRA	5 March 2021
Booba	"Kayna"	2021	TBA	
Booba	"Plaza Athénée"	2021	TBA	
Booba	"Dragon"	2021	TBA	
Booba	"VARIANT"	2021	TBA	
Booba	"Geronimo"	2021	TBA	
Booba	"Leo Messi"	2021	TBA	
Booba	"PRT"	2021	TBA	
Mimie	"Petite Soeur"	2022	TBA	
Ténor	"Mami Wata"	2022	TBA	
Singuila	"Dans ma bulle"	2022	TBA	
Youssou N'Dour	"Le grand bal"	2022	TBA	
Booba	"Pablo"	2022	TBA	

=== Albums & EPs ===
Incomplete list of album and ep released by Universal Music Africa
Year	Title	Artist(s)	Details	Certifications
2018	Un jour dans ma vie	Charlotte Dipanda	2018	
2018	The Bridge	Locko	16 February 2018	
2018	Nnom Ngui	Ténor	18 May 2018	
2018	Mixtape Made In Bled	Kiff No Beat	3 August 2018	
2018	Conquistadors	Toofan	31 August 2018	
2018	Life Is Eazi, Vol. 2 - Lagos to London	Mr Eazi	9 November 2018	
2018	Renaissance	DJ Arafat	28 December 2018	
2019	Cloud Nine	Locko	31 May 2019	
2019	Bledard Is The New Fresh	Kiff No Beat	13 June 2019	
2019	2020	Locked Up	Locko	22 May 2020
2021	Docteur Love	Singuila	12 February 2021	
2021	CD	Charlotte Dipanda	26 February 2021	
2021	MBALAX	Youssou N'Dour	12 November 2021	
2021	Era	Locko	17 December 2021	
