= A'Salfo =

Ivorian singer (born 1979)

A'salfo
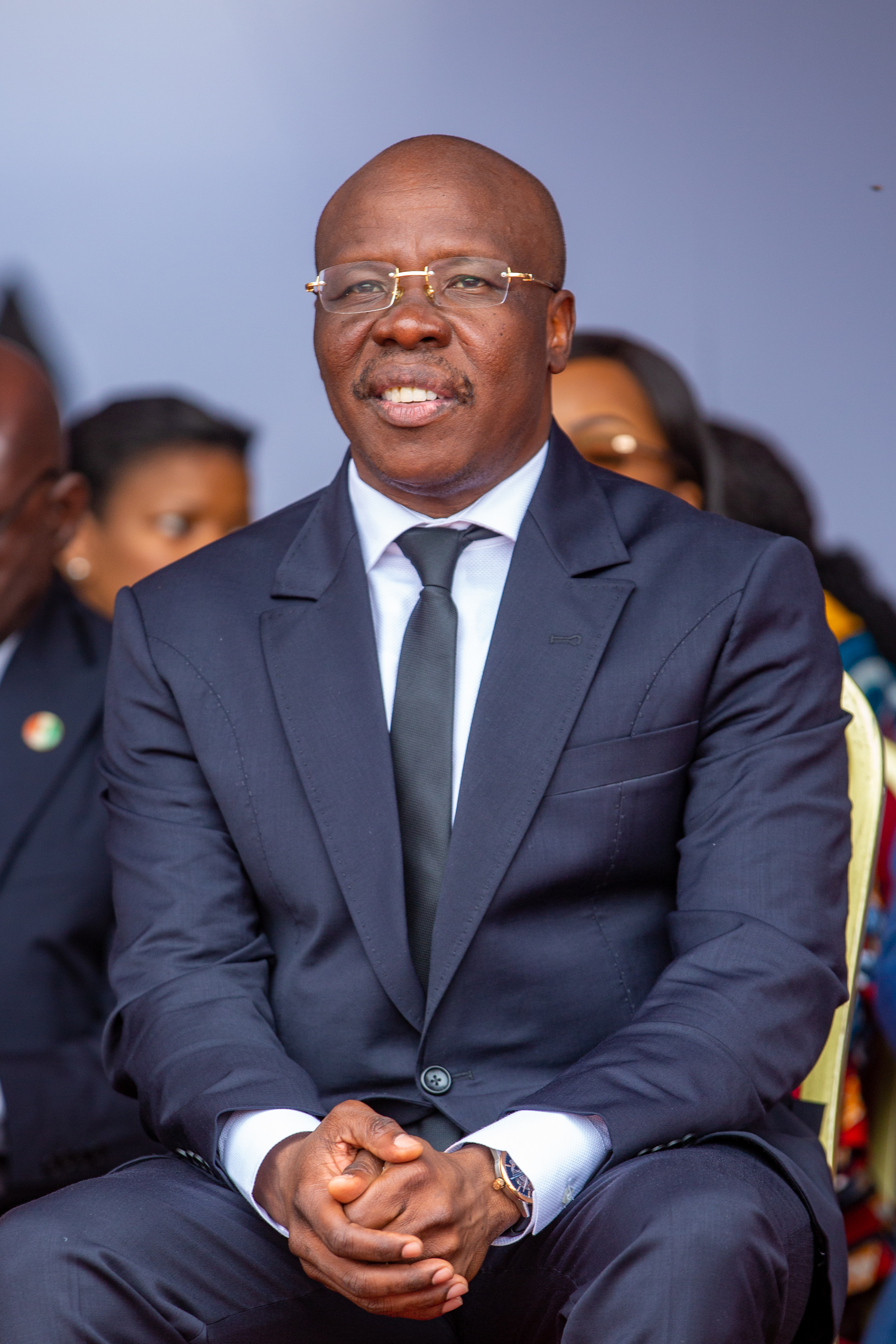
- A'salfo on 14 May 2024 at the opening ceremony of the 16th edition of the Anoumabo Urban Music Festival.
- Born: Salif Traoré; 15 March 1979 (age 47); Abidjan, Ivory Coast
- Education: HEC Paris
- Occupations: Singer; songwriter
- Years active: 1997–present
- Musical career
- Genre: Zouglou
- Instrument: Vocals
- Label: Parlophone
- Member of: Magic System

Salif Traoré (born 15 March 1979), better known by his stage name A'salfo, is an Ivorian singer. He is the lead singer of the group Magic System. He has a career spanning more than twenty years, punctuated by several albums and distinctions for his actions through music, but also community development. The Anoumabo Urban Music Festival was created in 2008 under his leadership, and is supported by the Magic System Foundation of which he is the president.

== Career ==
Born on 15 March 1979 in Abidjan, A'salfo comes from a family of eight brothers and sisters. His father is a worker in a construction company, his mother a housewife without profession. From an early age, he preferred music to his studies under the influence of his older brother Ali, who was a guitarist. In 1997, A'salfo became one of the founding members of the Magic System group. A group made up of: Goudé, Tino and Manadja After the success of the hit Premier Gaou (300,000 singles sold in France alone) he visited the music academy in France and became one of the tenors of African artists with a music degree.

On 20 August 2012, he was appointed UNESCO Goodwill Ambassador by Irina Bokova for his messages in favor of peace. In 2016 and 2017, he was a juror in The Voice Afrique Francophone. After moving to France in the Yvelines department in 2000, A'Salfo is gradually returning to Ivory Coast. There, with Magic System, he created the Anoumabo Urban Music Festival (FEMUA), which brings together African artists in the neighborhood where he grew up.

On 30 October 2019, he was appointed member of the Economic, Social, Environmental and Cultural Council (Cesec) of Ivory Coast by the President of the Republic Alassane Ouattara. On 22 December 2022, he was appointed member of the special council of the Ivorian Football Federation (FIF) by the president of said federation, Sidy Diallo. On 23 May 2021, A'Salfo was appointed Country Director of the Afrima Pan-African Music Competition by the competition's international committee. In 2023 he obtained a Master in Global Management from HEC Paris.

== Honours ==
- Officer Order of Ivory Merit (2007)
