= Chez Ntemba =

Chez Ntemba is a chain of nightclubs owned by Congolese business man Augustin Kayembe. The first Chez Ntemba nightclub was founded in 1992 in Lusaka. As of 2014 there are 41 night clubs all across sub-Saharan Africa. In June 2016, Chez Ntemba, hosted a music concert in the Kabulonga suburb of Lusaka.
