= Ernesto Djédjé =

Ivorian musician (1948–1983)

Ernesto Djédjé (1948–1983) was an Ivorian musician from Daloa. His parents were Wolof and Bété.

== Biography ==
Djédjé began playing music at fifteen when he became a guitarist with Ivoiro Star, a leading dopé band, in 1962. He moved to Paris in 1968 and became a student. He continued to perform and made his first recording with Anoma Brou Felix in 1970 with the help of Manu Dibango.

In 1972, he returned to his homeland to lead the San Pedro Orchestra. He later formed a band called Les Ziglibithiens and pioneered a musical style called Ziglibithy based on a kind of Bété roots music combined with Congolese rumba rhythms. Djedje's Ziglibithy is highly syncopated dance music, in which the sinuous guitar lines are punctuated with fat horns.

Djedje recorded his first solo album in 1977, calling it Ziboté with producer Gbadamassi Raïmi. Another album, Le Roi du Ziglibithy, was released on Badmos Records in 1977. He also released albums entitled Aguisse (also on Badmos Records), Tizere and Zouzoup Ale. All of these vinyl LP's are rare today, although Le Roi du Ziglibithy, which is arguably Djedje's best record, has been reissued on CD by Popular African Music, headquartered in Germany.

Ivoirian president Félix Houphouët-Boigny honored him for his contributions to national culture in 1982. Djédjé died suddenly of an untreated ulcer in 1983 at 35, although many claim that he was poisoned.

== Discography ==
- 1970 – Anowah – Tetialy Ble
- 1970 – Gniah Pagnou
- 1971 – N'Wawuile
- 1971 – Lorougnon Gbla / Ernesto
- 1973 – Zokou Gbeuly / Zokoly
- 1977 – Ziboté
- 1977 – Le Roi du Ziglibithy
- 1978 – Aguisse
- 1979 – 79 Golozo
- 1981 – Zouzoup Ale
- 1982 – Tizere
- 1983 – Souvenir
- 2001 – Le Roi du Ziglibithy (Popular African Music, P.A.M.)
