= Pamelo Mounk'a =

Congolese rumba artist (1945-1996)

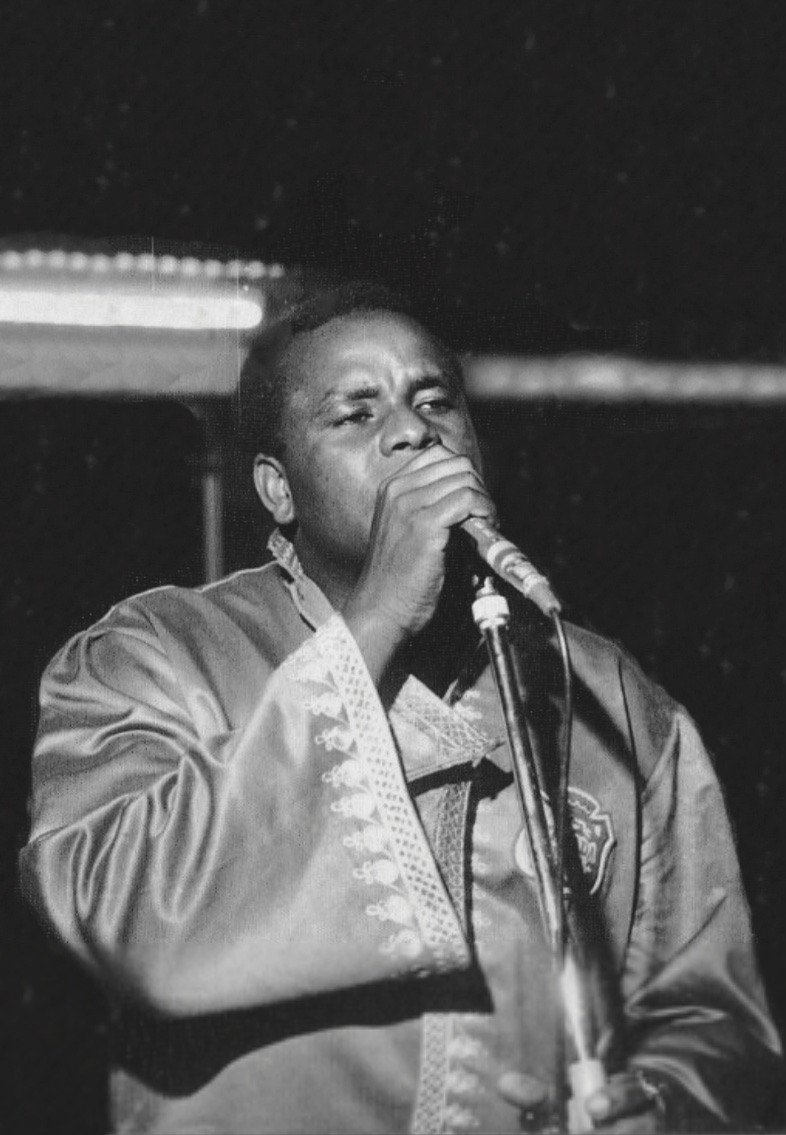
- Pamelo Mounk'a singing at Foire de Brazzaville in 1973

Background information
- Also known as: Pablito, Pamelo M'Bemba
- Born: Yves Andre M'Bemba; May 10, 1945; Brazzaville, Republic of the Congo
- Died: January 14, 1996 (aged 50)
- Genres: Soukous; Congolese rumba
- Occupations: Singer, songwriter
- Labels: Eddy'Son; Syllart; Sonodisc
- Formerly of: Les Bantous de la Capitale (fr); African Fiesta; Le Peuple du Trio CEPAKOS

Pamelo Mounk'a (May 10, 1945-January 14, 1996) was a Congolese singer and songwriter. Born Yves Andre M'Bemba, he was also known as Pablito and Pamelo M'Bemba.

== Career ==
Mounk'a (then calling himself Pablito) got his start when he was hired by Jean Serge Essous in 1963 for Essous' band Les Bantous de la Capitale(fr). He briefly crossed over the river in 1964 to sing with Tabu Ley Rochereau's band African Fiesta, before returning to Brazzaville and the Bantous.

In 1972 Orchestre Bantou broke up, with Mounk'a and two other singers forming the group Trio CEPAKOS. In 1978 he rejoined Orchestre Bantou to perform at the 11th World Festival of Youth and Students, which he claims he did at the urging of then-president Joachim Yhombi-Opango.

After leaving Orchestre Bantou once more, Mounk'a travelled to Paris in 1981. There, he signed on with Eddy'Son records and recorded L'Argent Appelle L'Argent and Samantha, which were hits. According to Graeme Ewens of the Guardian, the former sold over 400,000 copies across Africa. At this point he began going by the name Mounk'a, which according to him is a Teke name meaning glory.

In 1986 he agreed to return to Orchestre Bantou a third time, now as the conductor, though in a few years he had to leave the role due to health issues.

He died in 1996 of diabetes.

== Legacy ==
The Congolese Ministry of Culture erected a bust honoring Mounk'a, among others, in Brazzaville. Members of the band Extra Musica have cited Mounk'a as an influence.

== Discography ==
- Mansuwa (1968, written while part of Orchestre Bantou)
- L'Argent Appelle L'Argent (1981)
- Samantha (1981)
- Selimandja (1982)
- Propulsion (1982)
- Ca Ne Se Prete Pas (Africain No.1) (1983)
- 20 Ans De Carrière (1983)
- Camitana (1984)
- Metamorphose (1985)
- Assetou Diarabi (1985)
- L'Amour et La Danse (1986, with Orchestre Bantou)
- Cynthia (1986)
- Bonne Chance (1989)
- L'incontournable (1993, compilation album)
- L'essentiel (1993, compilation album)
- L'indispensable (1993, compilation album)
- Les Merveilles du Passé, vol. 2 (1995, with Orchestre Bantou)
