= Nayanka Bell =

Ivorian singer

- Born: Louise de Marillac; 1963 (age 62–63); Agboville, Ivory Coast
- Genres: Disco, funk
- Occupation: Singer/songwriter
- Years active: 1981–present

Nayanka Bell (born 1963 in Agboville, Ivory Coast) is an Ivorian singer who has released several albums, the earliest between 1982 and 1984.

== Biography ==
Bell's early work was inspired by the Francophone Caribbean, and although her native tongue is French, she sings in English. Her debut album, Amio, was released in 1983, with styles ranging from funk and disco to ballads. A second album in 1986, If You Came To Go, showed a greater Antillean influence. Bell is considered one of the top female Ivorian singers.

In 2000, she recorded a version of Serge Gainsbourg's "Je t'aime... moi non-plus", with Congolese singer Koffi Olomidé and performed it in front of 17,000 spectators at the Palais Omnisports de Paris-Bercy.

In April 2009, Bell was critically injured in a road accident, prompting rumours to spread that she had died. She in fact survived the accident although her injuries were serious and required several operations.

== Discography ==
- Just a Boogie (1983) SIIS
- Amio (1984) Celluloid
- Djama (1984) Celluloid
- If You Came to Go (1986) Celluloid
- Visa (1994) SLP Editions
- Brin de Folie (2001)
