= Kandet Kanté =

Kandet Kanté is a singer of Guinean origin who naturalized to become Ivorian since May 2004. Following Guineas post-election violence in 2011, she fled the country because of her association as the wife of Me Patrice Baï, bodyguard of former president Laurent Gbagbo. She has three albums including the latest "The daughter of soundjata", which earned her the trophy of the best Mandingo music in 2006 in Conakry. Kandet sings in Malinke, French and Soussou. For her, "it is important to be understood by a wide audience". Love, unity, gossips, scourges plaguing the world, the problems of existence and faith in God, are her favourite musical themes.

== Biography ==
For Kandet Kanté, becoming a great singer was the biggest dream she has had since childhood, especially since she was a member of a family in which big names were present, notably Mory Kanté, Manfila Kanté and Dianka Diabate. As a child, she got interested in singing and dancing whiles watching and taking up Jennifer Lopez and Janet Jackson as her models. Given the difficulties of everyday life in the neighbourhood she grew up in, Kandet often left the classroom for the streets. On one occasion she comes into contact with the drumming of "Panafricain", a troupe of African dancer. Her career began in 1986 with this troupe of Abobo which had changed their name many times, and was at a point called "Ensemble Milo".
