= Soum Bill =

Popular singer

- Born: November 2, 1972 (age 53); Aboisso
- Occupation: Singer

Soum Bill (born Soumahoro Ben Mamadou in Aboisso, Côte d'Ivoire) is a popular Ivorian singer. His song "Gneze" is the official 2006 FIFA World Cup anthem for the national team of Côte d'Ivoire. He is of mixed ethnicity: his mother is Agni, from Aboisso, while his father is Dioula, from Seguela. He joined the group Mini Choc in 1989 and changed his name to Soum Bill. After leaving Mini Choc, he was in a band called Les Garagistes and is now in Les Salopards (English translation "The Bastards").

== Discography ==
- Terres des hommes
