= Antoinette Konan =

- Born: January 1, 1960 (age 66); Béoumi
- Occupation: Singer

Antoinette Konan (born January 1, 1960) is an Ivorian singer.

Born in Béoumi to musician parents, Konan is a member of the Baoulé people. She studied music at the conservatory in Abidjan. She is known for her eponymous debut album, published in 1986 and reissued by Awesome Tapes From Africa in 2019, on which she was featured performing on the ahoko. She has been called the "queen of the ahoko" for her use of the instrument. She was named an Officer of the Order of Ivory Merit in 2013, having been previously named a knight in 1991.
