= Ziglibithy =

Music genre with Ivorian roots

Ziglibithy is a style of Ivorian popular music that developed in the 1970s. It was the first major genre of music from the Ivory Coast. The first major pioneer of the style was Ernesto Djédjé.
