= Ahoko =

Percussion instrument from Ivory Coast

The Ahoko is a traditional percussion instrument originating from the central part of Ivory Coast (Côte d'Ivoire) in West Africa.

The ahoko is a wooden rod with nutshells, each containing loose seeds, tied to strings which are then tightly wound around the end of the rod. The percussive sound can range from quiet to very loud.

In the Hornbostel–Sachs system it is categorised as 112.13 as a vessel rattle, a type of indirectly struck idiophone.

== Notable performers ==
- Antoinette Konan

== See also ==
- Music of Africa
