= Magic System =

Ivorian zouglou band

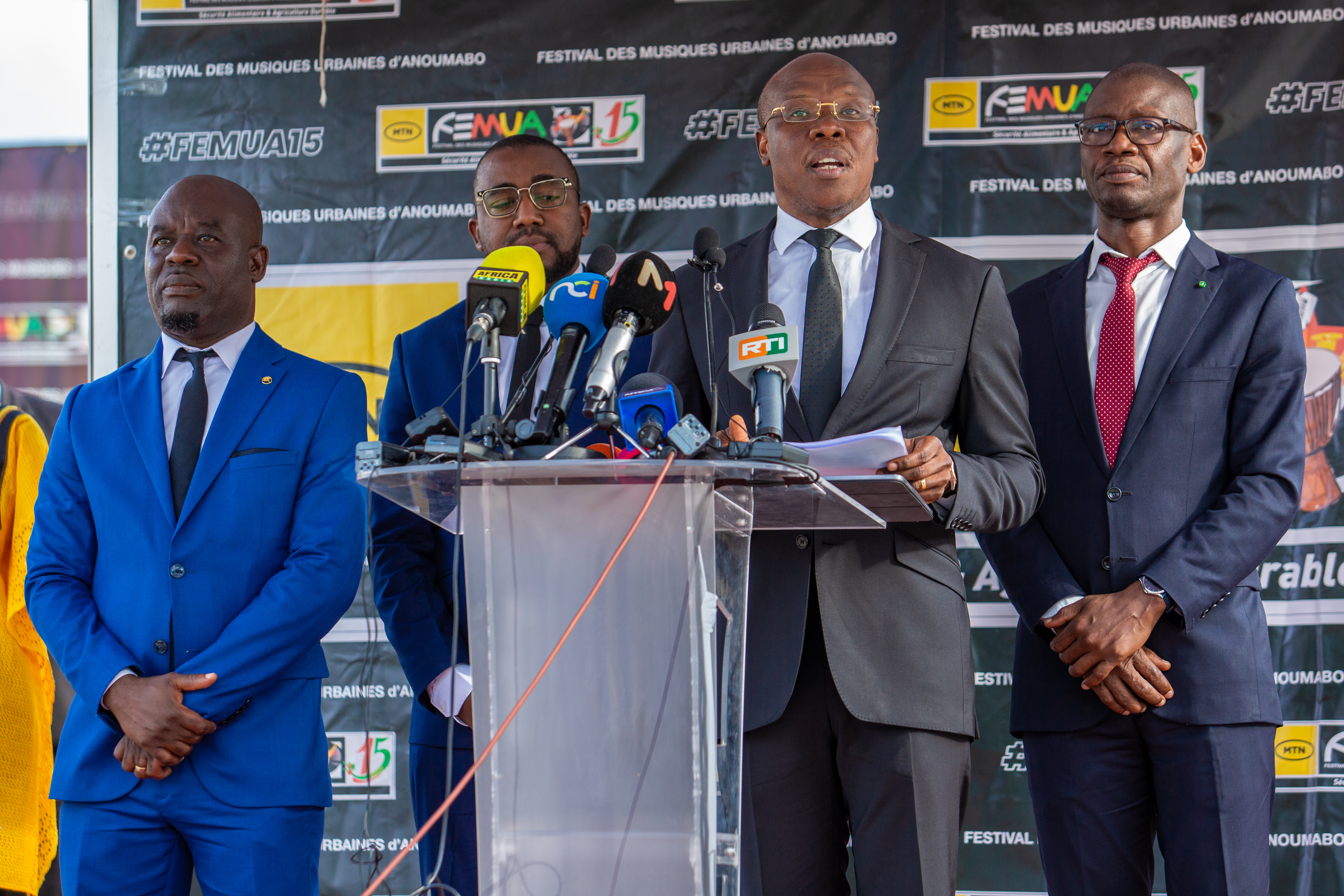
- Magic System at the opening ceremony of the 15th Anoumabo Urban Music Festival, in April 2023

Background information
- Origin: Abidjan, Ivory Coast
- Genres: Zouglou, Coupé-décalé
- Years active: 1996–present
- Labels: EMI (2003–2013); Virgin Records (2002–2006); Rec. 118 (2016–2017); Warner Music (2013–2020); Universal Music (since 2021)
- Members: A'Salfo; Manadja; Tino; Goudé
- Past members: Didier "Pépito" Deigna
- Website: www.magic-system.fr

Magic System is an Ivorian zouglou and coupé-décalé music group, formed in 1996 in Abidjan, Ivory Coast. When it was created, the group was composed of friends, the best known of whom today are A'Salfo, Goude, Tino and Manadja. The sounds drawn from zouglou ignited the African scene for more than a decade. Their songs are also used to denounce unhappiness and all forms of abuse in Ivorian society. They developed a reputation for high-energy live shows. However, dissensions arose within the group, which led to a break up and give birth to the group as it is known today as the four "magicians".

The group is famous for its performance of festive theme songs. Their biggest hits are the singles "Premier Gaou" (2002), "Un gaou à Oran" (2004), "Bouger Bouger" (2005), "C cho ça brûle" (2006), "Zouglou Dance" (2007), "Même pas fatigué !!!" (2009), "Ambiance à l'africaine" (2011), and "Chérie coco" (2011). The group gained worldwide attention in 2014 for their single Magic in the Air, which was widely played throughout the 2014 and 2018 FIFA World Cups. In 2023, the song Akwaba, which featured the group, Yemi Alade and Mohamed Ramadan, was chosen as the official anthem for the 2023 Africa Cup of Nations, and also won the Manie Musicale.

== Members ==
Salif Traoré, better known by his stage name A'salfo, is an Ivorian artist and songwriter. He is also a UNESCO Goodwill Ambassador and the founder of the Anoumanbo Music Festival. A'salfo developed a passion for music early in life, inspired by his older brother, a guitarist. In the late 1990s, he co-founded the group Magic System with three other musicians. The band gained widespread recognition with the release of their hit song "Premier Gaou", which marked a turning point in their career.

== History ==
The group hails from Abidjan, Ivory Coast, and has more than 50 members, called "magicians". The current members are part of the original group: A'Salfo (Salif Traoré), Goude, Tino (Étienne Boué Bi) and Manadja (Adama Fany). The current group is also made up of four other people who draw inspiration from the zouglou movement, an Ivorian cultural expression combining music and dance used by young people to address problems and ills in society. Divisions arose within the group from its beginnings, due to its large size and the presence of two main singers: Camso and A'Salfo. Camso and two other members decided to create the group "Les marabouts", which enjoyed considerable success in West Africa and within the African community in Europe.

Starting in 1996, the four magicians performed at local parties and events throughout the Ivory Coast. It was not until 1997 that their first album Papitou was released with the single "Momo", which was a commercial failure. They nevertheless persisted and recorded their second album, Premier Gaou, which was released two years later in Ivory Coast. Despite its local success, the group encountered difficulties obtaining distribution in France, as no label initially showed interest in producing the title.

The album is entirely financed by Ephrem Youkpo, journalist/radio and TV host (initiator of La Nuit du zouglou in 1998 in France and since then boss of the x-pol music label). Convinced of the potential of the project presented by Tony Adams, Youkpo took charge of financing the album. Faced with the refusal of the major record companies to distribute the album, Ephrem Youkpo decided to entrust the distribution of Premier Gaou to Sonima upon its release in January 2000. Also in 2000 the group was then invited to open for Bisso Na Bisso, a group of Congolese rappers led by Passi. In 2001, the third album, Poisson d'avril, had mixed success. The following year, the remix of "Premier Gaou" by Bob Sinclar relaunched the title dating from 1999 and introduced the group to the French public. Under this impetus, Magic System successively released three other albums: Un Gaou à Paris (2003), Petit Pompier (2005) and Cessa kié la vérité (2005).

On 2 April 2012, the group released its first best-of album, D'Abidjan à Paris, with the new unreleased single "Tango Tango". On 19 May 2014, the opus Africainement Vôtre was released, containing the hit "Magic in the Air", produced by RedOne in collaboration with Chawki, whose clip has several hundred million views. On 13 June 2014, the group Bana C4 performed a cover of the song "Premier Gaou", with Magic System which appears in the clip. Singer K-Reen contributes backing vocals to the song. The album Radio Afrika was released on 29 June 2015.

On 1 May 2016, Didier Bonaventure Deigna, drummer and backing vocalist of the group, drowned in Jacqueville (Ivory Coast) while trying to rescue a person.

On 16 June 2017, Magic System released a new album entitled Ya Foye. In 2018, the song "Magic in the Air" became the anthem of the France national team during the 2018 FIFA World Cup, performed in the stadium with each goal of the Blues. At the end of 2020, the group left Parlophone and Warner to sign with the new label Universal Music Africa, with the aim of releasing a new album Envolée zougloutique on 21 June 2021. In June 2025, the group Magic System released the track "Vida Loca", after an absence since 2021.

== Discography ==
=== Studio albums ===
Year	Album	Peak chart positions			Certifications (sales thresholds)
Year	Album	BEL (Fl)	BEL (Wa)	FRA	Certifications (sales thresholds)
1996	Papitou	—	—	—	
1999	Premier Gaou	—	—	19	
2001	Poisson d'Avril	—	—	—	
2003	Un gaou à Paris	—	—	73	
2005	Cessa kiè la vérité	—	55	13	
2007	Ki Dit Mié	—	—	25	SNEP: Gold
2007 A	Zesa Ke				
2007 B	Fo Dil AZ				
2007 CSF	Hara Kie				
2007 TN	Aada Kak				
2007 MKG	Hoseresden				
2008	Zerhasa U Paris				
2011	Toutè Kalé	—	35	7	SNEP: Platinum
2012	D'Abidjan à Paris	—	29	16	SNEP: Gold
2014	Africainement vôtre	185	21	11	SNEP: Gold
2015	Radio Afrika	—	74	25	
2017	Ya foye	—	113	122	

=== Singles ===
Year	Single	Peak chart positions								Certifications (sales thresholds)	Album
Year	Single	BEL (Fl)	BEL (Wa) Ultratop	BEL (Wa) Ultratip	FRA	GER	NED	POL	SWI	Certifications (sales thresholds)	Album
1997	"Momo"	—	—	—	—	—	—	—	—		Papitou
2001	"1er Gaou" (with Bob Sinclar)	—	10	—	4	—	—	—	30	SNEP: Gold	1er Gaou
2003	"Amoulanga"	—	—	—	94	—	—	—	—		1er Gaou
2003	"Un gaou à Paris"	—	—	—	58	—	—	—	—		Un gaou à Paris
2004	"Un gaou à Oran" (featuring 113 & Mohamed Lamine)	—	3	—	9	—	65	—	29		Cessa kiè la vérité
2005	"Bouger Bouger" (featuring Mokobé)	—	9	—	7	—	—	—	38	SNEP: Gold	Cessa kiè la vérité
2006	"C'chô, ça brûle" (featuring Akil Bilal, Cheb Bilal & Big Ali)	—	—	2*67	4	—	—	—	—	SNEP: Gold	Single only
2007	"Ki dit mié"	—	—	2*	8	—	—	—	96		Ki dit mié
2007	"On va samizé" (featuring Amine)	—	—	—	26	—	—	—	—		Ki dit mié
2008	"Zouglou Dance (Joie de vivre)"	—	18	—	2	—	—	—	66		Ki dit mié
2009	"Même pas fatigué !!!" (featuring Khaled)	—	10	—	1	—	—	—	49		Liberté (Khaled album)
2010	"Ambiance à l'Africaine"	—	28	—	11	—	—	—	—		Toutè Kalé
2011	"Chérie Coco" (featuring Soprano)	—	11	—	2	—	—	—	69		Toutè Kalé
2011	"La danse des magiciens"	—	27	—	36	—	—	—	—		Toutè Kalé
2011	"Vas-y Molo" (featuring Shaggy & Mohamed Allaoua)										Toutè Kalé
2012	"Tango Tango"	—	—	12*	99	—	—	—	—		Toutè Kalé
2013	"Mamadou"	—	—	17*	—	—	—	—	—		
2014	"Magic in the Air" (featuring Chawki)	10	1	—	3	64	—	20	23		Africainement vôtre
2014	"Tu es fou"	—	46	—	30	—	—	—	—		Africainement vôtre
2015	"Sweet Fanta Diallo (Adieu soleil)"	—	—	35	84	—	—	—	—		
2017	"Ya foye"	—	—	—	122	—	—	—	—		
2017	"All Around the World"	—	—	—	178	—	—	—	—		
"—" denotes releases that did not chart

*Did not appear in the official Belgian Ultratop 50 charts, but rather in the bubbling under Ultratip charts.

Featured in

Year	Single	Peak chart positions				Certifications (sales thresholds)	Album
Year	Single	BEL (Wa) Ultratop	BEL (Wa) Ultratip	FRA	SWI	Certifications (sales thresholds)	Album
2003	"On n'sait jaimais" (Leslie featuring Magic System & Sweety)	—	3*	8	22		Je suis et je resterai (Leslie album)
2020	"Quoi qu'il arrive" (Keen'V featuring Magic System)	—	—	—	—		Rêver (album de Keen'V)

*Did not appear in the official Belgian Ultratop 50 charts, but rather in the bubbling under Ultratip charts.
