= Zouglou =

Ivorian dance music genre

- Stylistic origins: Coupé-Décalé
- Cultural origins: 1990s Côte d'Ivoire
- Derivative forms: Coupé-Décalé

Regional scenes
- Côte d'Ivoire; Burkina Faso; Cameroon; Gabon

Zouglou (/ˈzuːɡluː/ ZOO-gloo, French: [zuɡlu]) is a dance oriented style of music originated from Ivory Coast during the mid-1990s. It started with students from a college of Gagnoa drawing on elements of other styles of music.

Zouglou recounts the various social realities experienced by the Ivorian youth and carries messages, sometimes humorous, sometimes political, or, more often, delivers advice on life. It has since spread elsewhere, including to Burkina Faso, Cameroon and Gabon.

== The export of the phenomenon ==
It was in 1989 that the zouglou as dance, language and philosophy, exports of the city of Yop to that of Abobo. Opokou N'ti, with real skills choreographic was blessed by Joe Christy to "liberate" (dance) to the city of Abobo to demand "teachers" who had invited them to fraternize. A few weeks later comes the demonstration zouglou in non-student in the hall of Kumasi, when the Ziguehi was a reality in Côte d'Ivoire, facilitated by Alain Gaston Lago and Tahi (Commissioner Tricot). The man of letters and culture Alain Tahi (student at the time) would already spread phenomenon.

Evolving in time, zouglou created and proposed successively dance steps without changing the truly musical form: Gnakpa, Kpaklo. Although in 1999 the zouglou achieved international renown thanks to Magic System, the genre remains relatively unknown.

It currently has several dozen groups or artists and zouglou: Yodé & Siro (Best Album 2009 Zouglou sign with Zo, Mèlèkè Lago Paulin Khunta & Cisco (Gochinago) Patterns, New Leaders, Coco Hilaire, Old gazère, Oxygen, Hope 2000, The mechanics ...

Zouglou emerged in the '90s as a musical genre and innovative Ivorian made by and for young people. If until that time singers like Bailly Spinto or Alpha Blondy much better known had managed to wear the colors of the Ivorian music, their songs were either inspired French folklore for some or all reggae for others. Rock, with such Gnahoré Jimmy at that time was also trying to get a place. Other traditional songs also drew them out of the game but this time music "Ivorian" was born, music is purely outcome of the cultural and Ivorian Abidjan.

== Popularity ==
Popular with the youth, the lyrics are written in local languages and French street slang,

Many popular Ivorian zouglou artists are living (or have lived) in exile due to their political support to the former president Laurent Gbagbo.

Groups associated with the zouglou style include Magic System, Sur-Choc (who appeared on the soundtrack of the 2005 FIFA Street game), Petit Denis, Vieux gazeur, Les potes de la rue, Les Garagistes, Mercenaires, Yode et Siro and Espoir 2000.

This concept has evolved to inspire new musical genres and dances (Gnakpa (dance), Mapouka, Youssoumba, and more recently the coupé-décalé) promoted by youth.
