= Meiway =

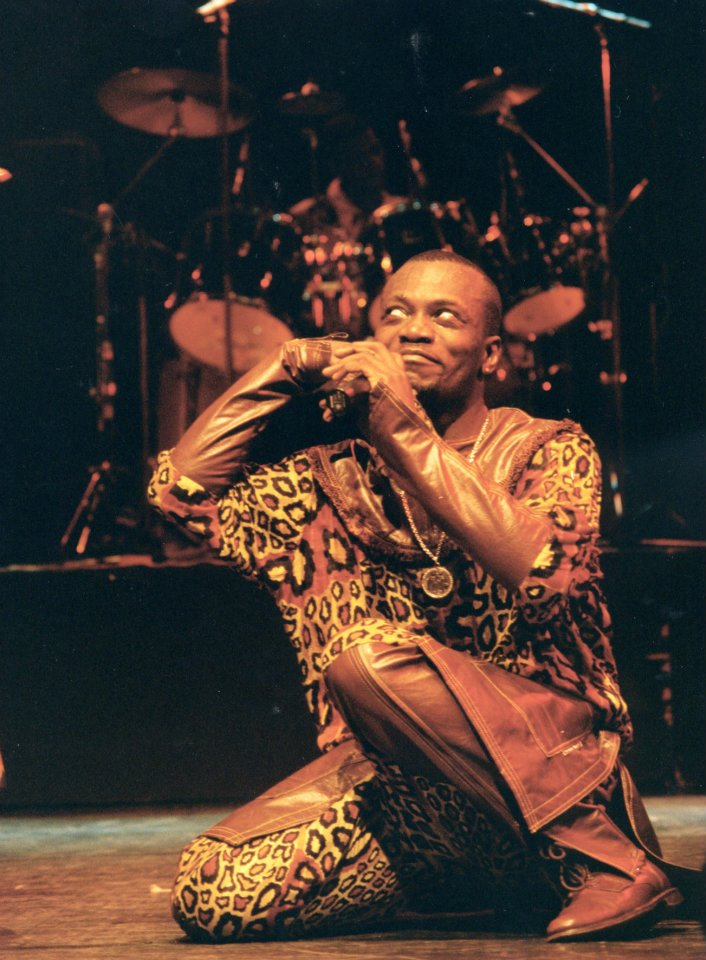

Background information
- Born: Frederic Desire Ehui; 17 March 1962 (age 63); Grand-Bassam, Ivory Coast
- Genres: Zoblazo
- Occupation: Singer/Songwriter
- Years active: 1989–present

Frederic Desire Ehui , best known as Meiway (born 17 March 1962 in Grand Bassam), is a singer from the Ivory Coast. He is most notable for pioneering the Zoblazo style. His hits include "200% Zoblazo", "Godeba", "Appolo 95", "Miss Lolo", and "DJ Tassouman".

== Discography ==
Studio albums

- Meiway (Ayibebou) (1989)
- 200% Zoblazo (1991)
- Jamais 203 (300% Zoblazo) (1993)
- Appolo 95 (1995)
- Les genies vous parlent (1997)
- Hold Up (Zo Gang feat. Meiway) (1998)
- Extraterrestre (1999)
- Le procés (Zo Gang International) (2000)
- Eternel (2001)
- Golgotha (2004)
- 9ème commandement (2006)
- M20 (Meiway 20 ans) (2009)
- Profeseur (2012)
- Illimitic (2016)
- Légende (2019)

Compilation albums

- Best Of (1997)
- Le meilleur de (2003)
