= Charlotte Dipanda =

Cameroonian singer

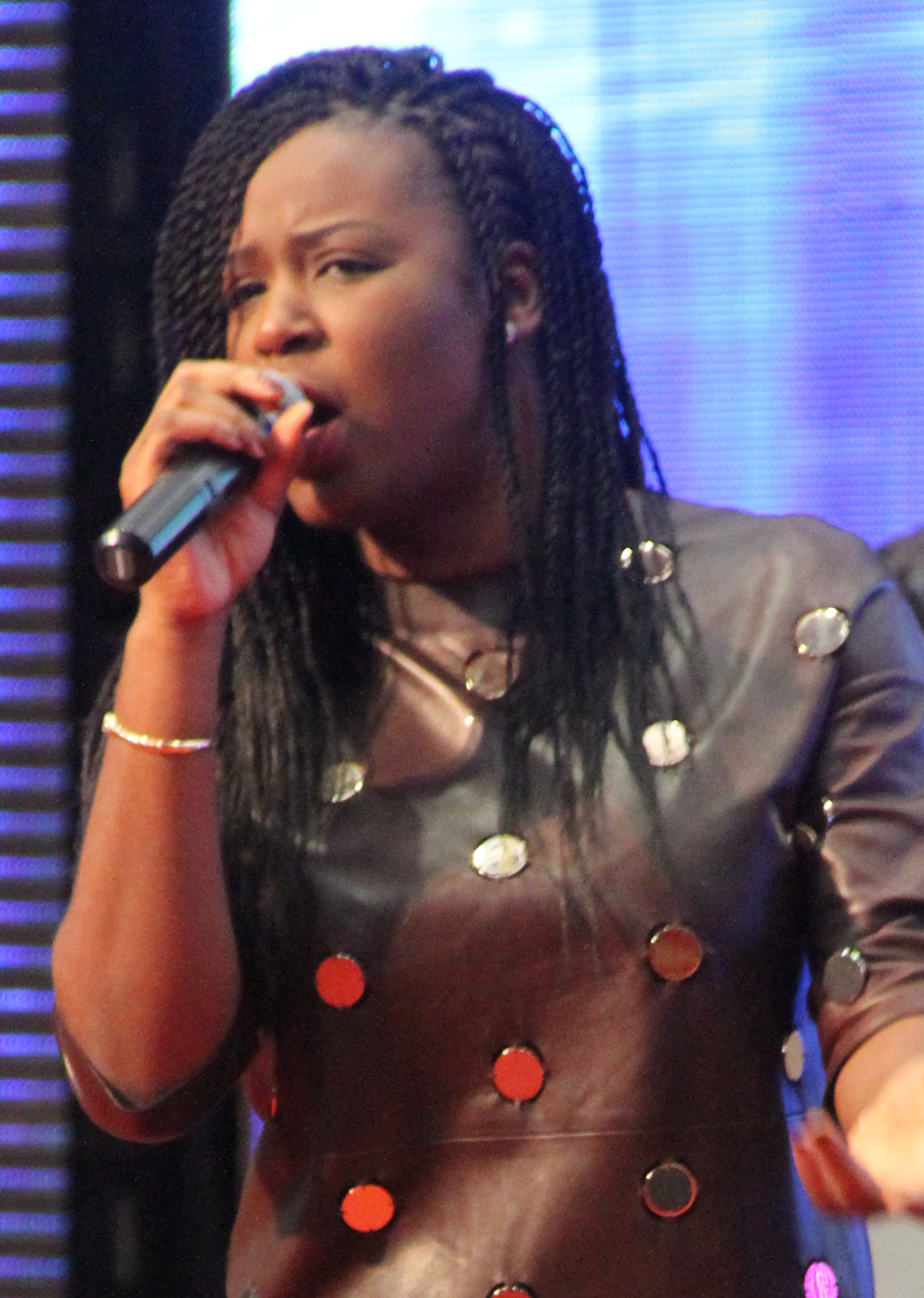
- Dipanda at the Yaoundé Multipurpose Sports Complex in 2016

Background information
- Born: 18 July 1985 (age 40); Yaoundé, Cameroon
- Genres: Afropop, Congolese rumba
- Occupation: Singer
- Years active: 2001–present
- Labels: Pharempire
- Website: charlottedipanda.com

Charlotte Dipanda (born 18 July 1985) is a Cameroonian singer who mostly performs acoustic music. Her lyrics are in French, her native language Bakaka, and in Douala.

== Early life and career ==
Dipanda made her first record with guitar player Jeannot Hens. It was released in 2002. She was spotted by Congolese musician Lokua Kanza, in an open-mic session at a Yaoundé club. She then moved to France, where she worked with Congolese singer Papa Wemba. Dipanda has provided background vocals for Manu Dibango, Rokia Traoré, and Axelle Red. Dipanda does most of her gigs in Europe but has also performed in the Palais des sports in her native Yaoundé. Her first solo album is called Mispa and was released in 2008. In 2014, she released her third album entitled 'Massa'. Her second album 'Dube L'am' was released in 2011. Charlotte Dipanda was one of the judges for the show The Voice Afrique Francophone broadcast on the channel Vox Africa in 2016.

At the 2018 edition of the Balafon Music Awards, she received two awards, namely Female Voice of the Year and clip of the year with Sista. She won the 2015 AFRIMA award for Album of the Year and Best Artiste in African Contemporary consecutively.

== Endorsements ==
Charlotte Dipanda holds endorsement deals, having gone on to be a Unicef ambassador, in 2019.

== Discography ==
=== Albums ===
| Title | Details |
|---|---|
| Mispa | Released: 2008; Formats: Digital download, CD |
| Dube I'am | Released: 25 December 2011; Formats: Digital download, CD |
| Massa | Released: 4 February 2015; Formats: Digital download, CD |
| Un Jour Dans Ma Vie | Released: 20 April 2017; Formats: Digital download, CD |
| 'CD'' | Released: 26 February 2021; Pharempire; Formats: Digital download, CD |

== Singles ==
| Title | Year | Peak chart position | Album |
|---|---|---|---|
| "To Be Nde Na" | 2008 | | Mispa |
| "Encore une fois" | 2008 | ~~--~~ | Mispa |
| "Bodimbea (featuring Richard Bona) | 2011 | ~~--~~ | Dube I'am |
| "Mouanyang" | 2011 | ~~--~~ | Dube I'am |
| "Ndolo Bukatè (Un peu d'amour)" | 2015 | ~~--~~ | Massa |
| "Na Bia Tè (Si je savais)" | 2015 | ~~--~~ | Massa |
| "Africa" (featuring Sauti Sol) | 2015 | ~~--~~ | Massa |
| "Kénè So (Aller de l'avant)" | 2015 | ~~--~~ | Massa |
| "Un jour dans ma vie" | 2017 | ~~--~~ | Un Jour Dans Ma Vie |
| "Wei" | 2017 | ~~--~~ | Un Jour Dans Ma Vie |
| "Sista (featuring Yemi Alade)" | 2017 | ~~--~~ | Un Jour Dans Ma Vie |
| "Muna" | 2017 | ~~--~~ | Un Jour Dans Ma Vie |
