= Black T Igwe =

Togolese singer-songwriter

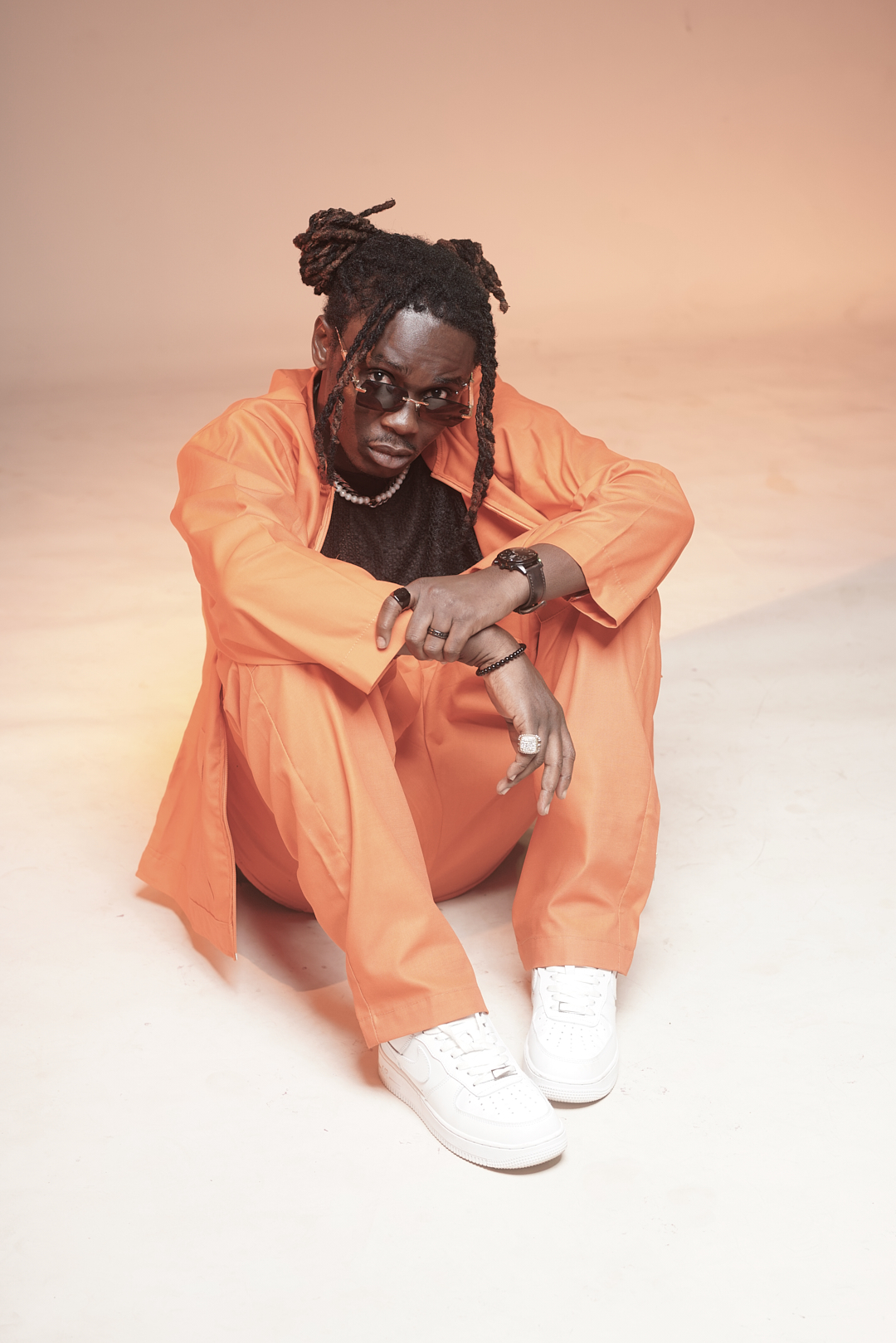
- Black T Igwe in 2024

Background information
- Born: Eric Yaw Otu; Obuasi
- Origin: Ghana
- Genres: Afropop; Afrobeat, Rap, RnB
- Instruments: Voice guitar piano
- Years active: 2000 – present
- Labels: Black Music Production now Wish Me Well Music (WMWM) and the Chronos'One Family collective KEFA Entertainment (from 2022 to 2024)

Black T Igwe (formerly Black T, also known as Eric Yaw Otu) born in Obuasi (Ghana), is a Togolese singer, musical arranger, beatmaker and singer-songwriter of Ghanaian origin.

He has been based in Togo since 1999, where he actively pursues his musical activities under his record label Black Music Production now Wish Me Well Music (WMWM) and the Chronos'One Family collective.

== Origin and training ==
Since childhood, he has nurtured a passion for music, despite his parents' opposition. In 2002, he began self-taught training in music engineering at Andigo Music Production in Ghana, before moving to Lomé in 2004. He then joined the Dodo Production studio team before returning to Ghana in 2006 to perfect his musical production technics. He returned to Lomé to further develop his skills with Joel Azeto at Rovers Records.

== Musical career ==
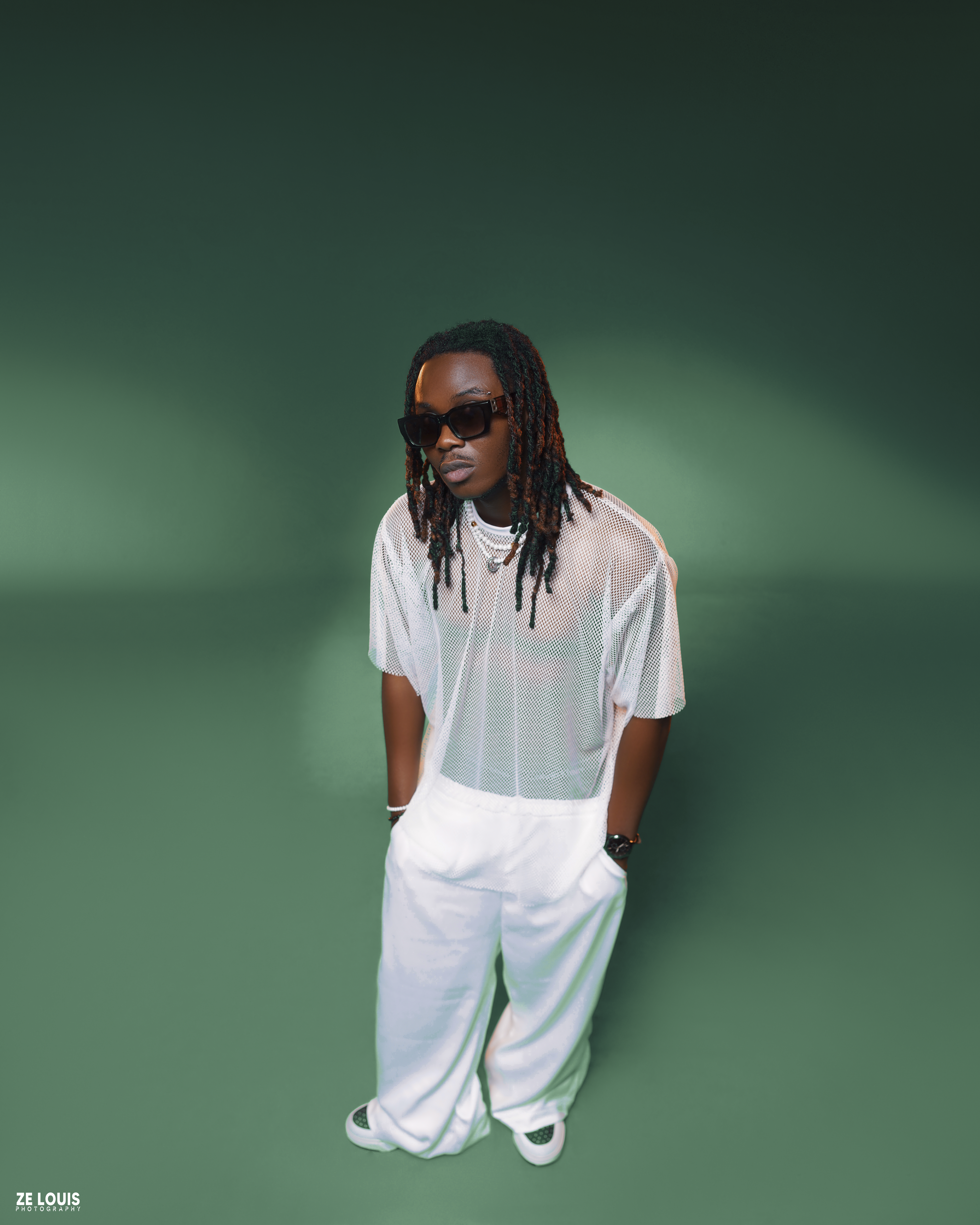
Black T Igwe at the studio in 2024

BlackT Igwe is a versatile artist, tackling social realities in a style that blends Afrobeat, Afropop and RnB. In 2004, he released his first hit single, Alonmé Mano, on the Be Real Production label, consolidating his reputation in Togo.

Back in 2009 with the singles Alognedzi Kede, which dominated the local charts and at the same time created his own studio Black Music Production and produced under the collective Chronos'One Family songs for artists such as Etane Blex and B4L.

Although he hails from the Ashanti region Black T Igwe has received awards in Togo and even musically produced Togolese singers such as Wedy and Most Wanted, and featuring King Mensah and other West African singers such asː Mink's (Cameroon), Bisa Kdei, Kelvyn Boy (Ghana), Shado Chris, Mike Alabi (Ivory Coast), Floby and Rich M'dali (Burkina Faso), Vano Baby and Zeynab (Benin).

== Career in music production ==
Alongside his music, Black T Igwe excels as a musical arranger, beatmaker and producer, mainly in Ghana and Togo contributing to the emergence of young singers and with projects such as Tognea Negble and Kpognoede, Djaglan, Mamamouna on his record label Black Music Production or under his collective Chronos One Family.

== Signature with KEFA Entertainment ==
In 2022, Black T Igwe joined KEFA Entertainment, a Ghanaian label with offices in Ghana and Togo. At a press event at Hotel IOKA in Togo, he was officially presented as the label's new artist. This collaboration aims to take his career to new heights, boosting his visibility and creativity.

KEFA Entertainment has already helped produce some landmark collaborations in 2021, such as his duet with Cameroonian Bisa Kdei in It's Over, whose official video has exceeded 270,000 views on YouTube.

== Scenes and Concerts ==
A list of some notable concerts

- 2017 ː Twelve Heroes of the Year Awards (Togo)
- 2018 ː National Tour for the Independence of Togo
- 2018 ː Urban Concert at The Omnisport Stadium The Omnisport Stadium (Lomé, Togo).
- 2018 ː Live in Burkina Faso
- 2018 ː Gabon Media Tour & Concert.
- 2020 ː Guest at king Mensah's 24-year anniversary concert
- 2020 ː Concert on the esplanade of the Palais des congrès de la ville in Kara
- 2020 ː 12th edition of the Forum National du Paysan Togolais
- 2019 to 2022 : European tour

== Events ==
- 2018 : Conference at MINT Hôtel and enthronement of Black T's "Igwe" by Reiyel Com and Events on November 23 at the Palais des Congrès in Lomé at public request.

== Discography ==
=== Albums ===
- 2019 : Boto

=== Singles ===
- 2014 : Mikui
- 2016 : Mépivi feat Agbeshie
- 2012 : Mapko Ndé
- 2013 : Tognea Negble
- 2015 : Jeunes Vaillants
- 2015: Maman Mouna
- 2016 : Kpognoede
- 2013 : Vonvon Nonto (VVNT)
- 2014 : I wanna know
- 2012 : Edzodjinam
- 2015 : Fire Burn Them
- 2016 : Come back
- 2017 : Shine Your Eyez
- 2017 : Abandon (featuring Mink's)
- 2017 : Menopoz (featuring R-Quenny)
- 2018 : Djaglan (featuring Etane Blex & B4l)
- 2018 : Boto
- 2018 : Boto (featuring Nasty Nesta) [Remix]
- 2018 : Oshee (featuring Pikaluz)
- 2019 : Kalkul pas (featuring Athiass Lamouziki)
- 2019 : Olevon (featuring Etane Blex)
- 2019 : Jamais abandonner (featuring King Mensah)
- 2019 : Les gos (featuring Nasty Nesta)
- 2020 : Miawotchan
- 2020 : Ayoo (featuring El Miliaro)
- 2020 : Volume
- 2017 : Togozik Igwe
- 2021 : It's Over (featuring Bisa Kdei)
- 2022 : Asiwoaledi
- 2022 : Humm humm (featuring Shado Chris)
- 2022 : Mawuyé (featuring Lauraa & Ghettovi & Six-cWatson & Lunick & El Miliaro, Mr Kurones)
- 2023 : Ma Dudu
- 2023 : Okou
- 2023 : Komio (featuring Beni J)
- 2023 : Winner (featuring Ghettovi)
- 2024 : Ewone (featuring Rejoyce Povi)
- 2024 : Komio (featuring Zeynab) [Remix]
- 2024 : God Bless You (featuring Kelvyn Boy)
- 2024 : Tsinguinin
- 2024 : Vis ta vie Tsinguinin 2

== Recognition ==
=== Rewards ===
- Four trophies by All Music Awards in Togo including the hit of the year trophy with "VVNT" (Vonvon nonto) in 2013 ːand nomination in the urban music category, male artist of the year, best beatmaker with his label Black Music Production in 2017.
- Nine trophies by The Heroes 228 in Togo.
- Award at La Nuit Des Imbattables in 2009 :.
- Awarded by TV2 in Togo
- Agoe Show Award
- Kara Award Music

== See also ==
- Floby
- Zeynab
- Bisa Kdei
- King Mensah
- Music of Togo
