= Abeti Masikini =

Congolese musician and philanthropist (born 1994)

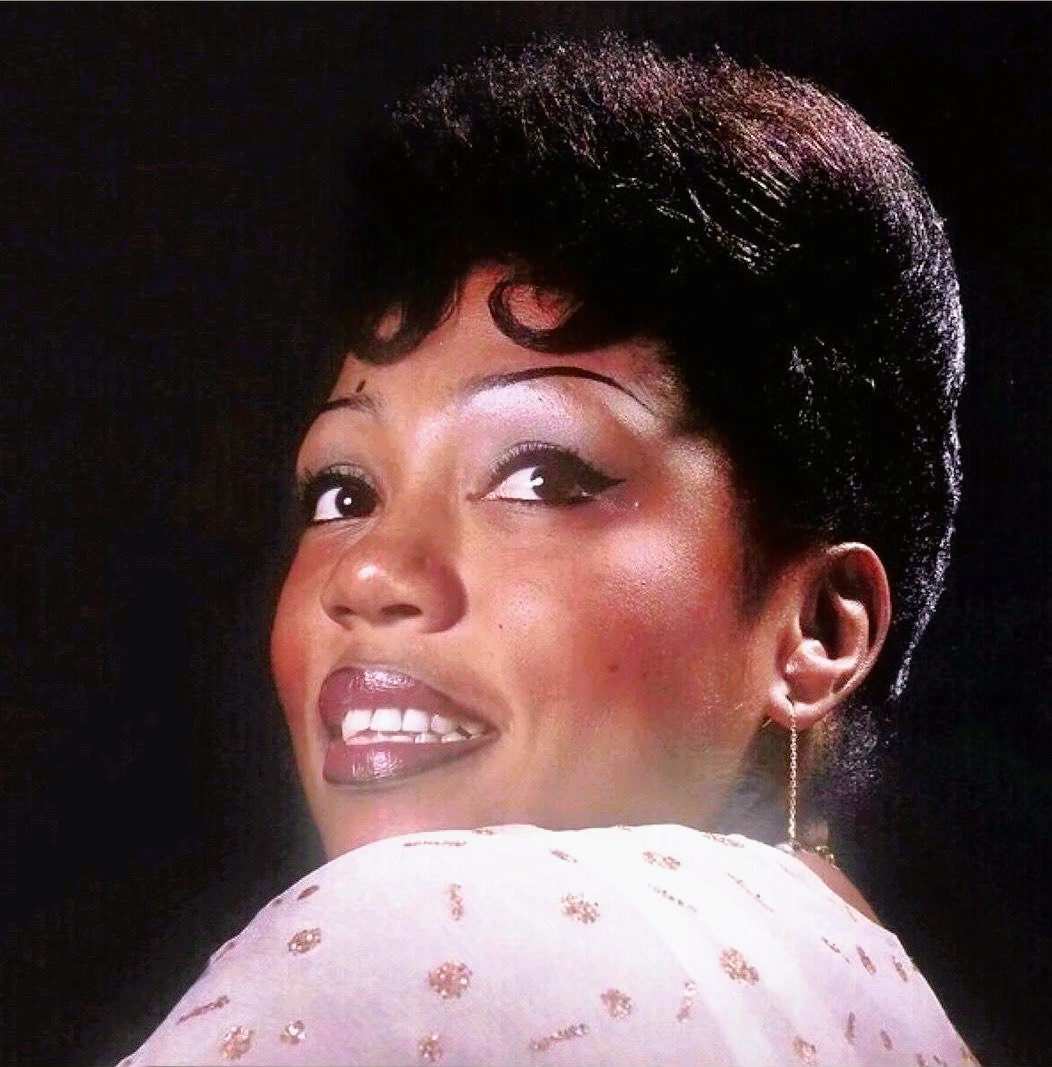
- Abeti Masikini in 1978

Background information
- Born: Elisabeth Finant; 9 November 1954; Stanleyville, Belgian Congo
- Died: September 28, 1994 (aged 39) Villejuif, France
- Genres: Soukous; rumba; folk; blues; world; pop
- Occupations: Singer; songwriter; dancer; record producer; bandleader; philanthropist
- Years active: 1971–1994
- Labels: Les Disques Pierre Cardin; Pathé Records; Aziza; BBZ Productions; RCA Records; Eddy'Son; Bade Stars Music; Jimmy International Production; PolyGram

Elisabeth Finant (9 November 1954 – 28 September 1994), known professionally as Abeti Masikini, was a Congolese singer, songwriter, bandleader, and philanthropist. With a nearly three-decades-long career, she was a significant figure in 20th-century Congolese and African popular music. Often referred to as the "Queen of Soukous", she is noted for advocating gender equality, modernizing Congolese music, and inspiring successive generations of musicians. Her band, Les Redoutables, was a launching pad for numerous female artists.

Born in Kisangani, then part of the Belgian Congo and now the Democratic Republic of the Congo, Masikini made her public debut in 1971 after being discovered by Togolese producer Gérard Akueson, following her feat in the Découverte des Jeunes Talents music contest organized by singer Gérard Madiata. Her debut album, Pierre Cardin Présente: Abeti, released in 1973, propelled her into the limelight, earning televised prominence and selling out numerous venues such as Paris's Olympia Hall and New York's Carnegie Hall. Over her three-decade career, Masikini recorded over twenty studio albums for a variety of record labels including Les Disques Pierre Cardin, Pathé Records, Aziza, RCA Records, Polygram Records, among others.

A trailblazer for African women in music, Masikini was the first Congolese female artist to lead her own band and perform in major international venues such as Carnegie Hall, Royal Albert Hall, Wembley Arena, and the Apollo Theater. She died of uterine cancer on 28 September 1994, in Villejuif, Paris.

== Early life and career ==
Abeti Masikini was born on 9 November 1954, into a Finant family, an upper-middle-class Congolese family of eight children in Stanleyville (now Kisangani), Belgian Congo. Her father, Jean-Pierre Finant, served as the first native Congolese governor of the Orientale Province in the then-Republic of the Congo. Abeti Masikini's mother, Marie Masikini, was a church's choir-leading vocalist at Collège du Sacré-Coeur (now Institut Maele). Abeti Masikini began singing as a chorister in her mother's church at an early age.

In 1961, Masikini's father, a Lumumbist party adherent, was assassinated in Bakwanga (now Mbuji-Mayi). The family went into exile in Kinshasa, where Masikini attended Lycée Sacré-Cœur (now Lycée Bosangani). After finishing secondary school, she worked as a secretary in the office of Culture Minister Pierre Mushete. While working as a secretary, her devotion to music swelled. In 1971, she altered her birthdate to claim she was 20 years old and enter the Découverte des Jeunes Talents music contest, organized by Gérard Madiata at the Parc de la Révolution (now Kinshasa Botanical Garden), where she placed third. At the end of 1971, Togolese manager and producer Gérard Akueson, then overseeing singer Bella Bellow, spotted her during a performance in Kinshasa and became her manager. In mid-1972, buoyed by several relatives, she established her band, Les Ecureuils, which included her younger brother, Jean Abumba Masikini, as the lead guitarist and performed in more intimate club venues.

=== 1972–1974: Pierre Cardin Présente: Abeti, Olympia Hall, Carnegie Hall, and Zaire 74 ===
Under President Mobutu Sese Seko's authenticité policy, Masikini traveled to West Africa to work on her upcoming album. She toured Benin, Ivory Coast, Senegal, Burkina Faso, Togo, Niger, Guinea, Ghana, and Nigeria. In Nigeria, she collaborated with Fela Kuti at the same recording studio, but after returning to Zaire, her prominence gradually declined due to the absence of her records from the Zairean market.

During a recital at the Palladuim Theater in Kinshasa, Masikini announced the upcoming release of her debut album, Pierre Cardin Présente: Abeti. Released in 1973, the album was produced by Les Disques Pierre Cardin, an eponymous label owned by French fashion designer Pierre Cardin, and was contained the singles "Mutoto Wangu", "Bibile", "Aziza", "Fulani", "Miwela", "Safari", and "Papa Yaka". "Bibilé" recounted a folk tale about a river guarded by malevolent spirits that had to be appeased before people could cross it and enter the forest to hunt. "Fulani" told a more urban story about two young girls discussing potential husbands. Pierre Cardin Présente: Abeti fused the genres of the blues, soul, and folk melodies.

The album initially received only a lukewarm response from Kinshasa audiences, however, as Masikini's Swahili-accented voice and eclectic musical influences led her to be regarded as a "foreign singer". Despite this initial skepticism from her fellow Zaireans, Pierre Cardin Présente: Abeti eventually gained attention through television appearances, following the renaming of her band to Les Redoutables.

Backed by Abumba and Les Redoutables, Abeti then recorded several other songs before joining Antoinette Etisomba Lokindji for concerts in Brussels at an authenticité conference.

Ahead of her 19 February 1973 concert at Paris' Olympia Hall, Masikini premiered her "Soleil à Dakar" show in Senegal, where she rehearsed with Les Redoutables in the presence of President Léopold Sédar Senghor. She later performed at Olympia Hall alongside Mireille Mathieu and Hugues Aufray, becoming only the second African female artist to ever perform there (the first having been Egyptian singer Umm Kulthum on 14 November 1967), and only the second sub-Saharan African artist to perform there (following Tabu Ley Rochereau in 1970). British musicologist Gary Stewart later noted that Masikini was feeling unwell during the performance, and performed with restraint. Proceeds from the concert went to a drought-relief fund.

After her Paris performance, Masikini leased a residence at the Shelburne-Murray Hill Apartment Hotel ahead of her New York concert. On 11 March 1974, she performed at Carnegie Hall with Les Redoutables, whose instrumentation included electric guitars, bass, and modern conga drums. She was among the "few female African vocalists" to have performed in the United States up until that time, following Miriam Makeba and her protégée Letta Mbulu. In an interview with the New York Times, Masikini said that the fundamental rhythm of her music was African and that African youth were "revolutionizing their music". After the performance, plans began for a nationwide U.S. tour.

In September 1974, Masikinirticipated in Zaire 74, a promotional musical festival event for the heavyweight boxing championship match between Muhammad Ali and George Foreman, billed as the Rumble in the Jungle. Masikini shared the stage with James Brown, Miriam Makeba, Franco Luambo & OK Jazz, Zaïko Langa Langa, Tabu Ley Rochereau, Bill Withers, B. B. King, the Spinners, and other musical artists.

=== 1975–1979: Musical evolution ===
==== Abeti Masikini and Abeti à Paris ====
Masikini released her 8-track self-titled second album, Abeti Masikini, in 1975, which was released by Pathé Records, a subsidiary of Pathé Marconi EMI. The album explored aspects of Zairean society, including Congolese food, romantic relationships, sexuality, and women's emancipation. "Ngoyaye Bella Bellow" paid tribute to Bella Bellow, while "Kiliki Bamba" criticized Mobutu's authenticité policy and addressed the exploitation of young girls by sexual predators. "Likayabo" praised a Zairean dish made with salted codfish, vegetables, and regional seasonings, while "Yamba Yamba" explored men's deceit and women's enduring love. The album earned Masikini artistic recognition in West Africa, and led to an invitation from Bruno Coquatrix to perform at Olympia Hall for two consecutive days in April 1975. She was dubbed "the tigress with the golden claw, for the numerous rings she wore. Later that year, she performed at Stade de Lomé, in Togo.

In 1976, Masikini released her third studio album, Abeti à Paris, which included the original version of "Mwana Muke Wa Miso". Recorded and produced in Paris by Pathé, the album reflected Masikini's musical development and connection to the city. The following year, she performed in Amsterdam, and at Cinéma Vog in Brazzaville.

==== Career challenges and Abeti ====
By the mid-1970s, Masikini faced growing competition from M'Pongo Love, whose hit "Pas Possible Mati" topped Kinshasa's charts and airwaves. Her once-popular African blues-folk style also faced criticism for its Swahili-oriented repertoire, which some critics argued had limited appeal among Lingala-speaking Congolese audiences. Yet the same repertoire had driven her success abroad. To sustain her Kinshasa presence, Gérard Akueson urged her to perform alongside M'Pongo Love at the Palladium Cinema on Boulevard du 30 Juin.

In response to the criticism, Masikini released her fourth studio album, Abeti, which features tracks in a different style, including "Bilanda-Landa", "Kizungu-Zungu" (co-written with bassist Zenge-Zenge), "Inquiétude" (co-written with pianist Ray Lema), "Banana", "Biso-Basi" (also known as "Nous Les Femmes"), and "Folie-D'Amour" (co-written with Jean Abumba Masikini). The Capriccio release, distributed by Music Control S.A.R.L., also featured alto saxophonist Soki Mikanda, tumba drummer Wawanko Joë, drummer Boffi Banengola, soloist Bikouta Sebastien, rhythm guitarist Gomez Watunda, and tenor saxophonist Akunda. "Kizungu-Zungu" reached the top 10 of the Congolese music charts.

Though criticized by Kinshasa adults, her audience consisted largely of children who regularly attended her Super Abeti Show at the Palladium Cinema and affectionately called her "auntie". Adult admirers of her alternative rhythms formed the Les Amis d'Abeti fan club, which was led by Antho Alves.

==== Visages, Kupepe Suka and brief stint with OK Jazz ====
While preparing Visages, Masikini released the promotional single "Motema Pasi" (alternatively titled "Bilanda-Landa"). In 1978, she traveled to Paris to record the album, working with arranger and producer Slim Pezin. Produced by Pezin for the French label BBZ Productions, Visages was distributed by RCA Records. The album departed from her earlier work by incorporating disco while retaining Congolese rhythms, with some tracks sung entirely in Swahili, Lingala, or French. Although it drew criticism for departing from traditional Congolese music, Visages gained recognition in West Africa, Europe, and the Caribbean, where it achieved significant success among Afro-Caribbean audiences. During a promotional tour in West Africa, Masikini seized the attention of Radio Netherlands, which filmed Abeti en Holland, featuring songs from Visages. After her return to Kinshasa, an extensive advertising campaign promoted Visages.

Released in late 1978, the Pezin-produced fifth studio album Kupepe Suka featured "Singa Mwambé", a tribute to Masikini's hometown of Kisangani, and "Kupekusa", which became an anthem of the Zairean national football team. Masikini performed at Estádio da Cidadela in 1978 and London's Royal Albert Hall in 1979. After the success of her two previous albums, she returned to Kinshasa and collaborated for the first time with the prominent rumba band TPOK Jazz, recording the singles "Na Pesi Yo Mboté" and "Bifamuri", the latter of which became popular in Kinshasa and Brazzaville.

=== 1980–1985: Mokomboso, Dixième anniversaire, and Abeti ===
In 1980, Masikini released her sixth studio album, Mokomboso, a disco-pop blend of African rhythms. France-produced by Guadeloupean label Eddy'Son, run by Eddy Gustave, who arranged the album and played alto saxophone, it yielded five singles: "Mokomboso", "Tchaku-Tchaku", "Mawazo", "Falanga", and "Sinahamu". That March, during Mobutu's official visit to China, Chinese National Theater singer Zhu Mingying performed two of Masikini's earlier Visages hits, "Bisuivra Suivra" and "Motema Pasi", which emulated her style and earned her the moniker "the new Chinese Abeti".

In 1981, marking her tenth-year career, Masikini released her eleventh studio album, Dixième anniversaire, which was arranged by Sammy Massamba and issued by Dragon Phénix. The six-track set was buoyed by several rumba hits including "Baruwa Kwa Mupenzi", "Chéri Badé", "Père Bouché", "Ndolindo", "Bilonda", and "Zaire Oye". The breakout single, "Chéri Badé", achieved national recognition and spent a record ten consecutive weeks atop the Office Zaïrois de Radio-Télévision (OZRT) chart. Rumba subsequently became Masikini's preferred rhythm, though her growing reliance on the style diminished some of the musical distinctiveness that had set her apart in Zaire.

In 1982, Masikini performed in Copenhagen; two years later, she relocated to Lomé, where she remained with Les Redoutables until January 1986. During her West African residency, her self-titled Abeti was released in 1985 by Gabonese label Production IRIS and distributed by Zika Production. Arranged by Jacky Arconte, the four-track album yielded "Jalousie", "I Love You" (alternatively titled "Mwasi Ya Bolingo"), "Boyokani", and a version of "Na Pesi Yo Mboté". Initially recorded in early 1982, "I Love You" became a sleeper hit in 1985. Abeti earned a gold record after selling more than 300,000 copies in Africa.

=== 1986–1989: Je suis fachée and En colère ===
In spring 1986, Masikini relocated to Paris, where she released Je suis fachée on the Parisian label Bade Stars Music. Its soukous-inspired title track was written, arranged, and produced by Cameroonian singer Georges Seba, while Nyboma wrote "Lolo". It gained popularity in the Caribbean during a phase when the West Indian band Kassav dominated the Afro-Caribbean music scene. Je suis fachée also earned gold certification. Masikini later performed at the Wembley Arena and participated in the Mama Africa Festival in Utrecht.

In 1987, the Gérard Akueson-produced album En colère was distributed by Bade Stars Music, with arrangements by Lokassa Ya M'Bongo and Georges Seba and backing vocals by Ballou Canta, Dada Hekimian, Georges Seba, and Marylou Seba. The album featured a backing ensemble including drummers Denis Hekimian and Boffi Banengola, horn players Eric Giausserand, Jacques Bolognesi, and Alain Hatot, bassist Michel Alibo, synthesizer player Philippe Guez, and percussionists Sam Ateba and Komba Bellow. Its success earned Masikini the sobriquet "Soukous Parfumé", while the single "Scandale De Jalousie" became a hit in West Africa and the West Indies. She promoted En colère at Ouagadougou Stadium and appeared on the Champs alizés show in Martinique, where she received a Maracas d'Or for the album.

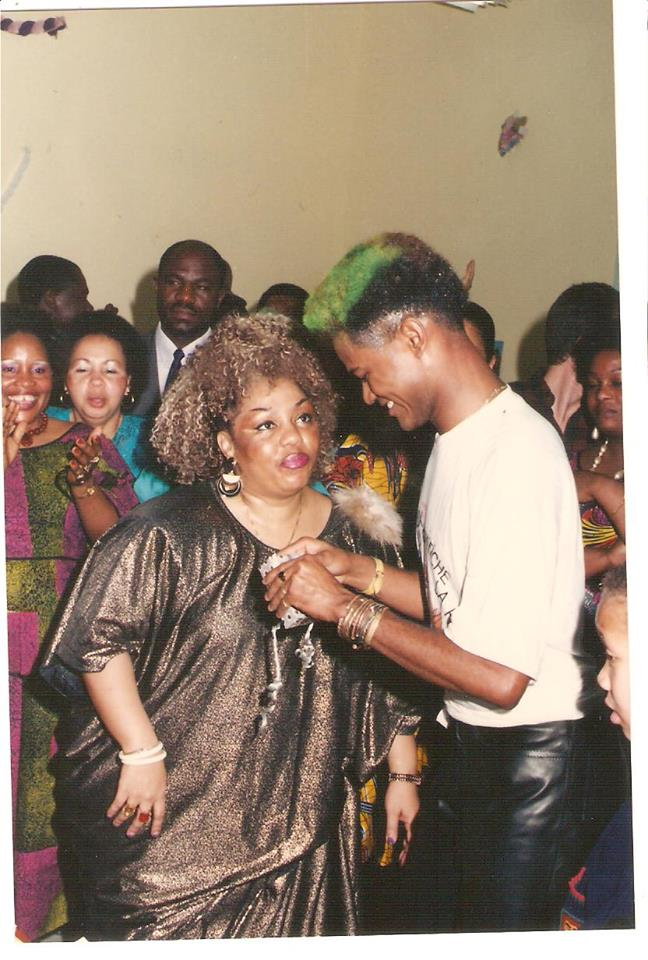
Masikini in 1989

Supported by Berthrand Nguyen Matoko's international fan club, Masikini's 24 September 1988 Zénith de Paris concert drew 5,000 spectators and featured guest artists Bernard Lavilliers, Manu Dibango, Nzongo Soul, Pépé Kallé, Seba, Aurlus Mabélé, and François Lougah. Broadcast live on Radio France Internationale, the concert's success led to a contract with multinational record company PolyGram. In 1989, she toured China with Zhu Mingying, where she performed 17 galas in major cities, before later appearing at Harlem's Apollo Theater.

=== 1990–1993: La Reine du Soukous ===
Masikini performed at Kinshasa's Palais du Peuple on 15 December 1990. The next year, she released her final album, the Jimmy International Production-produced and PolyGram-edited La Reine du Soukous, featuring arrangements by Seba and Lokassa Ya M'Bongo and backing vocals from Dada Hekimian, Fédé Lawu, Seba, Marylou Seba, Richard Lebrun, and Solo Sita. Masikini wrote most of the album's tracks, with "Ousmane" co-written with Mayaula Mayoni and "Ma Lu" with Seba. The album featured "Mupenzi", "Ousmane", "Bebe Matoko", "Ma Lu", and "Je Suis Occupée", as well as a cover of "Mwana Muke Wa Miss". In 1993, she performed at the LSC hall in La Plaine Saint-Denis on New Year's Eve.

== Illness and death ==
Masikini was diagnosed with uterine cancer while working on her final album, which eventually progressed during her time in Paris. The illness kept her away from the public in the subsequent months, leading her to take a short hiatus from music.

She died on 28 September 1994, in Villejuif, France, due to the progression of uterine cancer. Her body was repatriated to Kinshasa on 9 October of the same year. She was posthumously honored with a medal of the National Order of the Leopard and was laid to rest on 10 October at the Gombe cemetery. The funeral ceremony was attended by several personalities, her family members, and devoted fans.

Between 27 September and 9 October 2004, a major tribute event was held at the Pullman Kinshasa Grand Hôtel to mark ten years since her death, bringing together Koffi Olomide, Meiway, Youssou N'Dour, Ray Lema, Lokua Kanza, Manu Dibango, Amy Koïta, Mbilia Bel, Patience Dabany, Pierrette Adams, Sam Mangwana, Pierre Akendengué, King Mensah, Monique Séka, Tshala Muana, Papa Wemba, Werrason, Angélique Kidjo, Aurlus Mabélé, Ismaël Lô, Charlotte Mbango, Abby Surya, King Kester Emeneya, Yondo Sister, Passi, Diblo Dibala, Mireille Mathieu, Awa Maïga, JB Mpiana, Bana OK, and others. The ceremony was organized by the Abeti Masikini Foundation alongside Akweson Worldwide and Shabani Records. That same month, Kinshasa commemorated her legacy by inaugurating Abeti Masikini Avenue.

== Legacy ==
Masikini is one of the most prominent figures in contemporary African music. She is one of the Congolese female artists who carved a professional niche in the male-dominated music scene. Her band Les Redoutables is considered to be one of the greatest "musical schools" as many notable artists have passed through it, including M'bilia Bel, Lokua Kanza, Abby Surya, Malage De Lugendo, Tshala Muana, Yondo Sister, Lambio Lambio, Komba Bellow, Richard Shomari, and Joëlle Esso (dancer), among others.

Her style of makeup, fashionable hairstyles, and clothing had a significant influence on several African women. In West Africa, the straight skirt with a slit is known as the "Abeti skirt", and a wax fabric was named after her hit song "Scandale De Jalousie".

In 2014, a documentary film titled Abeti Masikini: Le Combat d'Une Femme was released, which traces Abeti Masikini's life and artistic journey. The film was directed by Laura Kutila and Ne Kunda Nlaba.

== Discography ==
=== Albums ===
- 1973: Pierre Cardin Présente: Abeti (Les Disques Pierre Cardin/Sonafric) Ref: SAF 93501
- 1975: Abeti Masikini (Pathé Marconi/EMI) Ref: 2C O64 15741
- 1976: Abeti à Paris (Pathé Marconi/EMI) Ref: 2C06215.772
- 1977: Abeti (Capriccio) Ref: 37014
- 1977: Visages (BBZ productions/RCA) Ref: BZL 7014
- 1978: Abeti: Kupepe Suka (BBZ productions/RCA) Ref: BZL 7019, RCA – BZL 7019
- 1979: Na Pesi Yo Mboté (45 rpm)
- 1979: Bifamuri (45 rpm)
- 1979: Mbanda Na Ngai (45 rpm)
- 1980: Mokomboso (Eddy'son/ Sonics Records) Ref: 79398 / 79398
- 1981: Dixième anniversaire (Dragon Phoenix) Ref: DPX 829
- 1982: Abeti (Iris production) Ref: IRS 001
- 1983: Abeti: Naleli (Zika Production)
- 1984: Amour Ya Sens Unique (IAD/African Record Industry) Ref:IAD/S 0015
- 1984: Abeti & Eyenga Moseka: The Duo Of The Century (IAD/ African Record Industry) Ref: IAD/S 0016
- 1985: Ba Mauvais Copiste (Win Records/Africa New Sound/Tabansi) Ref: WNL 403, ANS 8402
- 1985: Samoura (Bade Stars Music) Ref: AM 030
- 1986: Je suis fachée (Bade Stars Music) Ref: AM 033
- 1987: En colère (Bade Stars Music) Ref: AM 035
- 1988: Scandale de jalousie ( maxi 45 rpm ) (Polygram/ LAB) Ref: LAB 101
- 1990: La Reine du soukous (AMG/Polygram)

=== Reissue ===
- 2013: Le Tube Chéri Bade (Biobionava/G.Akueson). Reissue of the Tenth Anniversary album .

== Bibliography ==
- Berthrand Nguyen Matoko (1999). Abeti Masikini la voix d'or du Zaïre. L'Harmattan. ISBN 2-738-47823-9.
