= Abeti =

Abeti is both a given name and surname. Notable people with the name include:

- Abeti Masikini (1954–1994), singer from the Belgian Congo
  - Abeti Masikini: Le Combat d'Une Femme
- Pasqualino Abeti (1948–2024), Italian sprinter
