= Olokun Festival =

Festival in Nigeria

Olokun festival
- Language: Yoruba

Origin
- Meaning: Local Wrestling
- Region of origin: Yorubaland, West Africa

The Olokun Festival is the name of an annual cultural festival celebrated throughout Yorubaland in West Africa by Yoruba people of various sub-groups, and also by the Edo people. In the Yoruba language, okun means "sea", while osa means "lagoon". Olokun is the deity of the sea, while Olosa also known as Osara is the deity of the lagoon and estuaries. Both are celebrated and venerated in different festivals.

In Yoruba tradition, the chief Olokun shrine is located in the Ilode quarter of Ile Ife. According to the Walode of Ile-Ife Chief Kolawole Omotayo, who is the Abore (Chief Priest) of Olokun of the Source explained: “Olokun is the goddess who gathered all the water of the earth together, at creation, and moved it to its current location – the sea. At the beginning of life, the earth was formless and filled with water. Olodumare through Ọbatala, the chief Orisha, went to the world to commence the process of filling it with life. Thus Obatala, armed with igba iwa, descended from heaven through a chain. “Right from Ilode, where we stand now, the great goddess Olokun began of drawing all the water together. After this she moved everything through Ilare to a very remote part of the earth which is now the sea of today.

Among the Ilaje who live along the coastline of Ondo State, Olokun is believed to be the goddess of the sea, who has the power to give children to barren women. She is also believed to be in control of ocean waves, and she can sink sea vessels of evildoers. Olokun is also a goddess of riches and has the power to enrich her devotees. The worshippers of Olokun are generally dressed in immaculate white attires with their faces coated with white chalk ‘efun’. As a festival of note among the Ilaje, the Olokun Festival is held in high esteem, as the people believe it has a moderating influence on their lives.

The Edo celebrate theirs in late February (1st 'moon' after the 12th moon) that takes place in Usonigbe, the site of Olokun's shrine, in Edo State. Another, more modern festival is held in Lagos State in November.

The latter festival, which has been held since 2002, is organized by the Olokun Festival Foundation and has become an important tourist and local attraction. It is led by Otunba Gani Adams, who also leads the Oodua People’s Congress.
