= Fourth German Inner Africa Research Expedition =

Expedition to Nigeria and Cameroon between 1910 and 1912

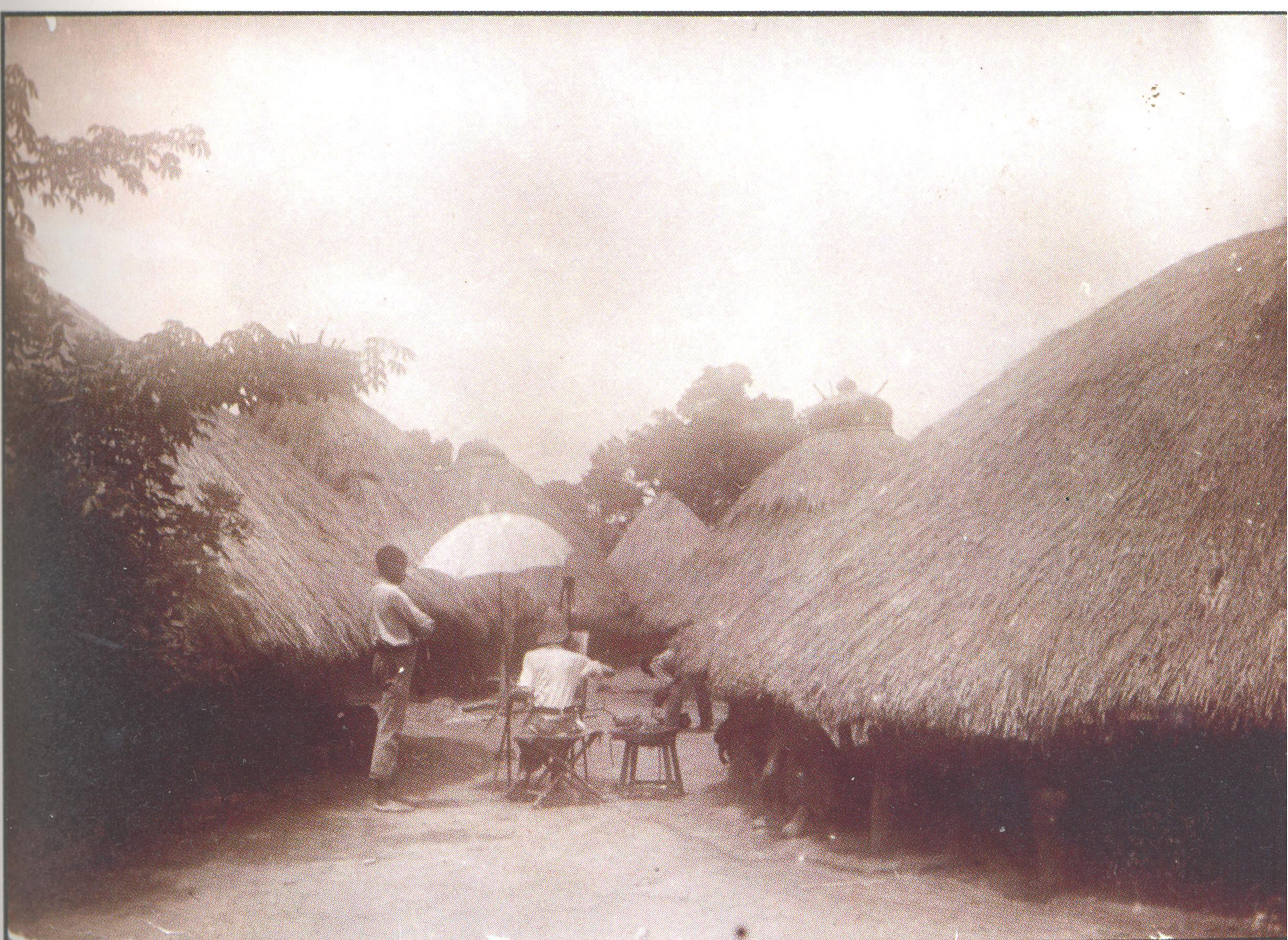
A photograph taken by the expedition in a village of the Tiv people in August 1911

The Fourth German Inner Africa Research Expedition was carried out in Nigeria and Cameroon between 1910 and 1912 under the leadership of ethnographer Leo Frobenius. Frobenius carried out archaeological excavations at the ancient Yoruba city of Ife in Nigeria and published his findings in twelve volumes between 1921 and 1928. Frobenius theorised that the intricate bronze and terracotta sculptures he discovered at Ife were relics from the mythological city of Atlantis.

== Background ==
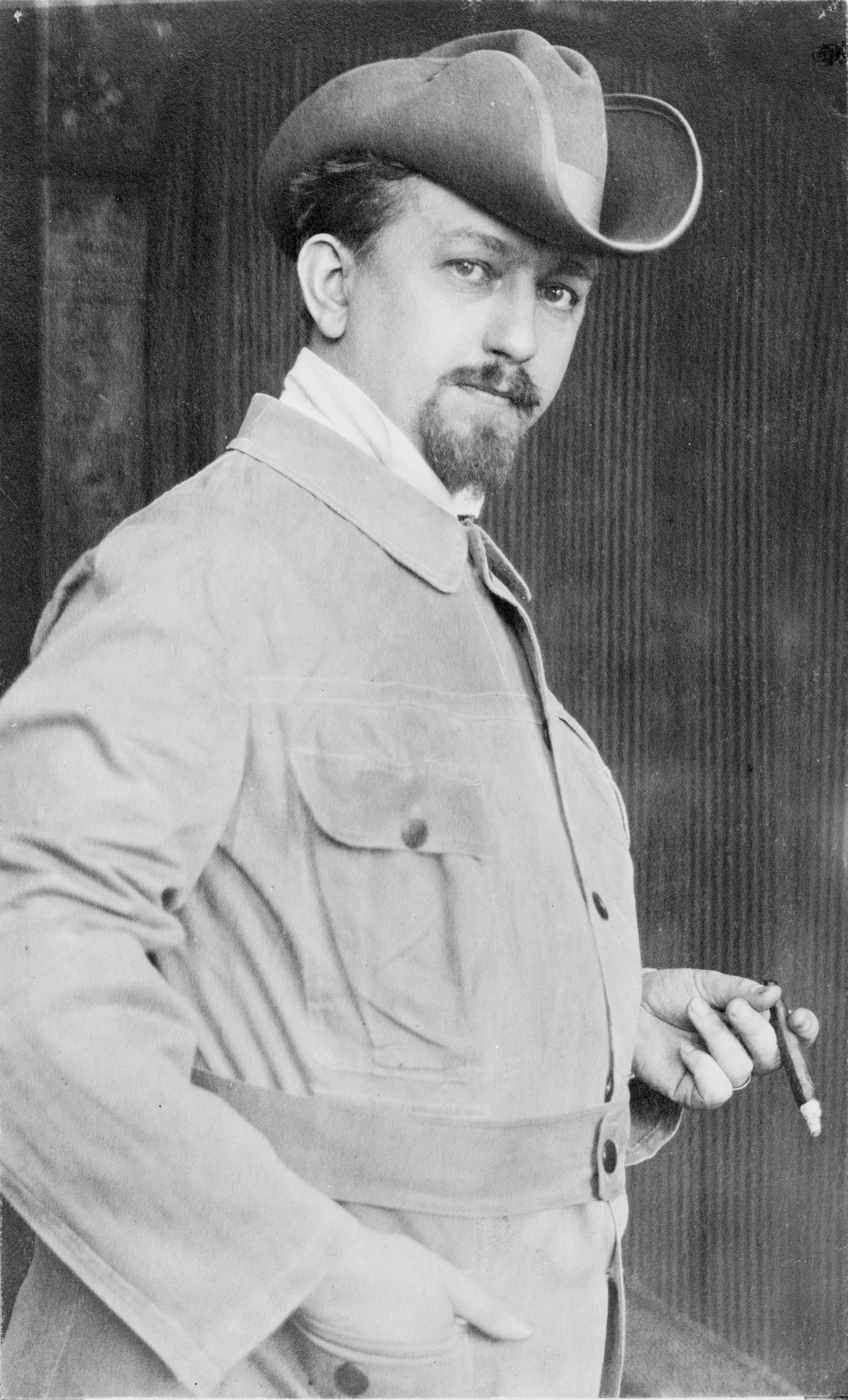
Ethnologist and archaeologist Leo Frobenius

Leo Frobenius was a self-taught German ethnologist and archaeologist who specialised in African cultures. He led twelve German Inner Africa Research Expeditions (Deutsche Innerafrikanische Forschungs-Expeditions, DIAFE) to Africa between 1904 and 1935. His work in the field has been described as epic and pioneering and is of considerable documentary value. However his conclusions on the development of African civilisation from non-African origins were controversial and are not supported by modern writers. He has also been accused of using the expeditions to loot items of cultural value from Africa.

== Expedition ==
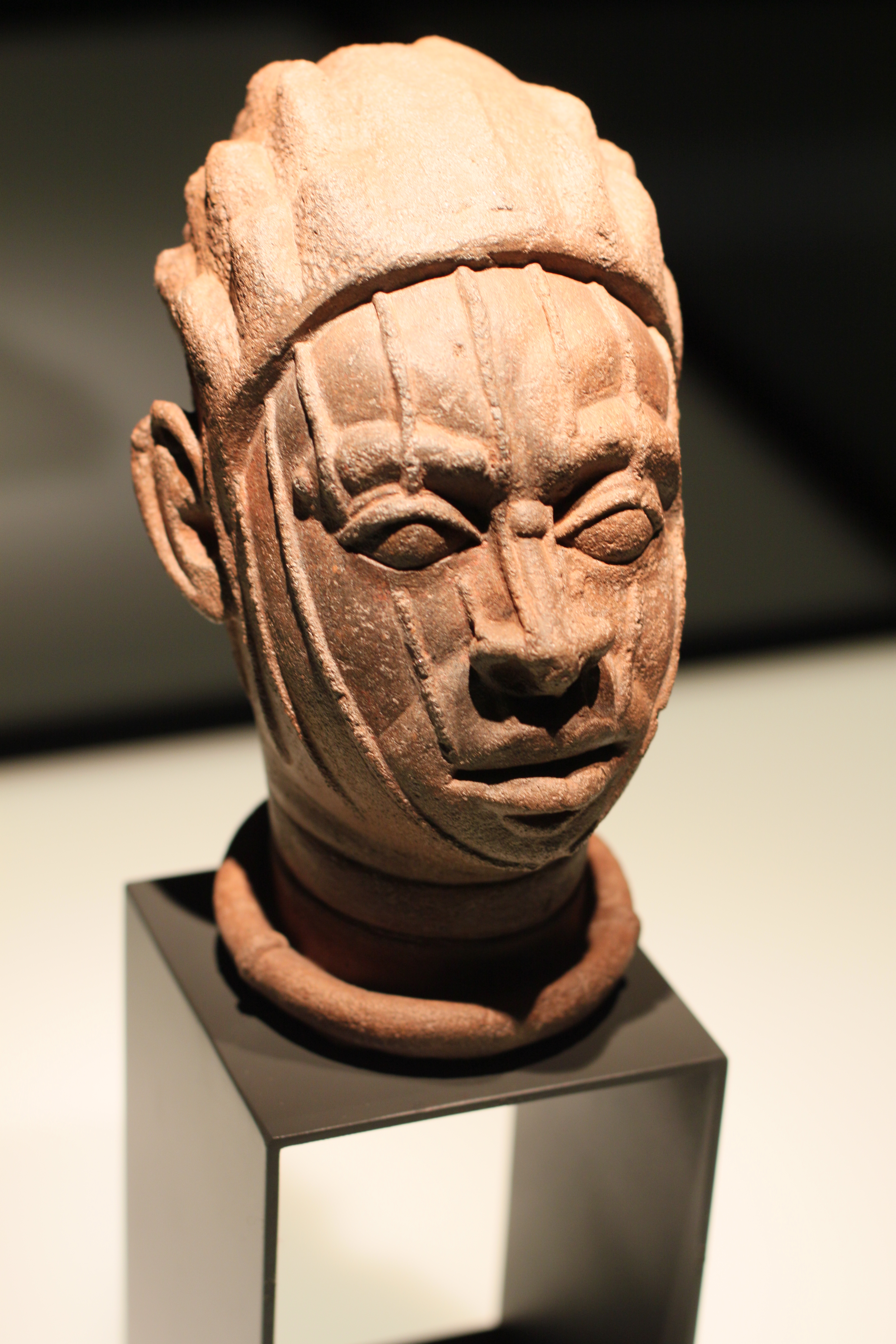
A terracotta head recovered during this expedition

Frobenius led the fourth German Inner Africa Research Expedition to Nigeria and Cameroon between 1910 and 1912. This is referred to in some sources as his third expedition. This expedition was one of the first serious archaeological investigations of Ife, an ancient Yoruba city in Nigeria, and also carried out an anthropological study of the Yoruba people. The expedition arrived at Ife on 29 November 1910 and spent three weeks there studying the archaeological remains. Frobenius returned to Germany in early 1912 and spent just three days at home in the Tyrol with his wife, daughter and brother before leaving for his fifth expedition.

== Atlantis theory ==
Frobenius assumed that the bronze heads and terracotta figures he found in his excavations at Ife were too sophisticated to have been made by the local people and believed them to be relics from the mythical city of Atlantis. After discovering one statue he stated "Before us stood a head of marvellous beauty, wonderfully cast in antique bronze, true to the life, encrusted with a patina of glorious dark green. This was, in very deed, the Olokun, Atlantic Africa's Poseidon. I was moved to silent melancholy at the thought that this assembly of degenerate and feeble-minded posterity should be the legitimate guardians of so much loveliness". He was mistaken however, the statues had in fact been created between the 12th and 15th centuries AD by Ife sculptors. Frobenius formally announced his "discovery" of the existence of Atlantis on 29 January 1911 whilst he was in Togo.

Frobenius published his findings in twelve volumes entitled Atlantis between 1921 and 1928. He included an in depth study of Yoruba culture, religion and mythology and his theory that they were descended from then ancient inhabitants of Atlantis. Despite removing numerous artefacts Frobenius had no licence to do so and was tried in a Nigerian court for trafficking. Casts of six terracotta heads from figures that Frobenius excavated at Ife were acquired by the British Museum in 1927; the originals are in Berlin.
