= Wadada =

Wadada is both a given name and a surname. Notable people with the name include:

- Wadada Leo Smith (born 1941), American trumpeter
- Ahmed Wadada, Nigerian politician
- Nicholas Wadada (born 1994), Ugandan footballer
- Dani Wadada Nabudere (1932–2011), Ugandan academic

== See also ==
- King Wadada, also known as Austin Peter, Nigerian reggae musician
