= Pierrette Adams =

Congolese singer

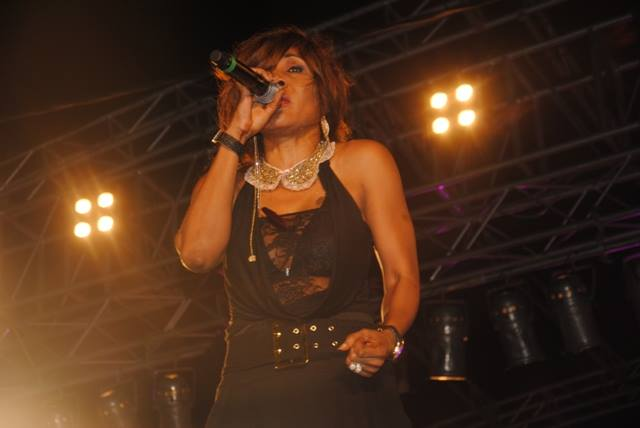
- Pierrette Adams, 2014

Background information
- Born: May 5, 1962 (age 64); Pointe-Noire, Republic of the Congo
- Years active: 1994–present

Pierrette Adams (born 5 May 1962) is a singer, nicknamed "Mère Z", from the Republic of the Congo, who was based for many years in Abidjan in Côte d'Ivoire, and since 2003, has been based in Dakar in Senegal. She has released seven albums since 1994, plus a greatest hits disc in 2004.

== Early life ==
Pierrette Adams was born on 5 May 1962, in Pointe-Noire, Republic of the Congo.

Before she worked professionally as a singer, Adams was an air hostess for the now defunct pan-African airline Air Afrique.

== Career ==
Adams' career as a singer did not really succeed until she relocated to Abidjan, in Côte d'Ivoire. With the assistance of Boncana Maïga, of Africando, she was able to start her career as a singer and release her debut album Journal Intime in 1994.

In 2003, she moved to Dakar in Senegal, because her husband had to move there for work. Her 2003 album Anesthésie was well-received and she was nominated for the 2003 Kora All Africa Music Awards.

She had a "difficult childhood", and her songs cover topics including child abuse, injustice and infidelity.

== Discography ==
- Journal Intime (1994)
- Mal de Mère (1996)
- Je Vous Salue Maris (1999)
- Absolument (2000)
- Anesthésie (2003)
- Best Of 10 Ans + Inédit "Nasuba" (2004)
- Coma Profond (2007)
- 7e Jour (2012)
