= Olokun =

Orisha of the deep sea in the Yoruba religion

- Oceans; Water; Fishermen; Health; Wealth
- Member of Orisha
- Olokun altar pot
- Other names: Olocún, Olókun
- Venerated in: Yoruba religion, Candomble, Santeria
- Major cult center: Ile-Ife (Yoruba); Urhonigbe (Benin)
- Abode: The ocean
- Symbol: Shells, chains, water, Sea creatures
- Color: Blue, white, green, beige
- Region: Nigeria, Benin, Cuba, Brazil
- Ethnic group: Yoruba people Bini people
- Festivals: Olokun Festival

Equivalents
- Greek: Poseidon
- Vodún: Agwé

Olokun (Yoruba: Olókun [olókũ]) is an orisha in Yoruba religion. Olokun is the deity of the bottom of the ocean and is believed to be the parent of Ajé, the orisha of great wealth. Olokun is revered as the ruler of all bodies of water and for the authority over other water deities. Olokun is highly praised for their ability to give great wealth, health, and prosperity to their followers. Communities in both West Africa and the African diaspora view Olokun variously as female, male, or androgynous. The name of the Orisha has also been loaned into the religion of the neighboring Edo people.

== West Africa ==
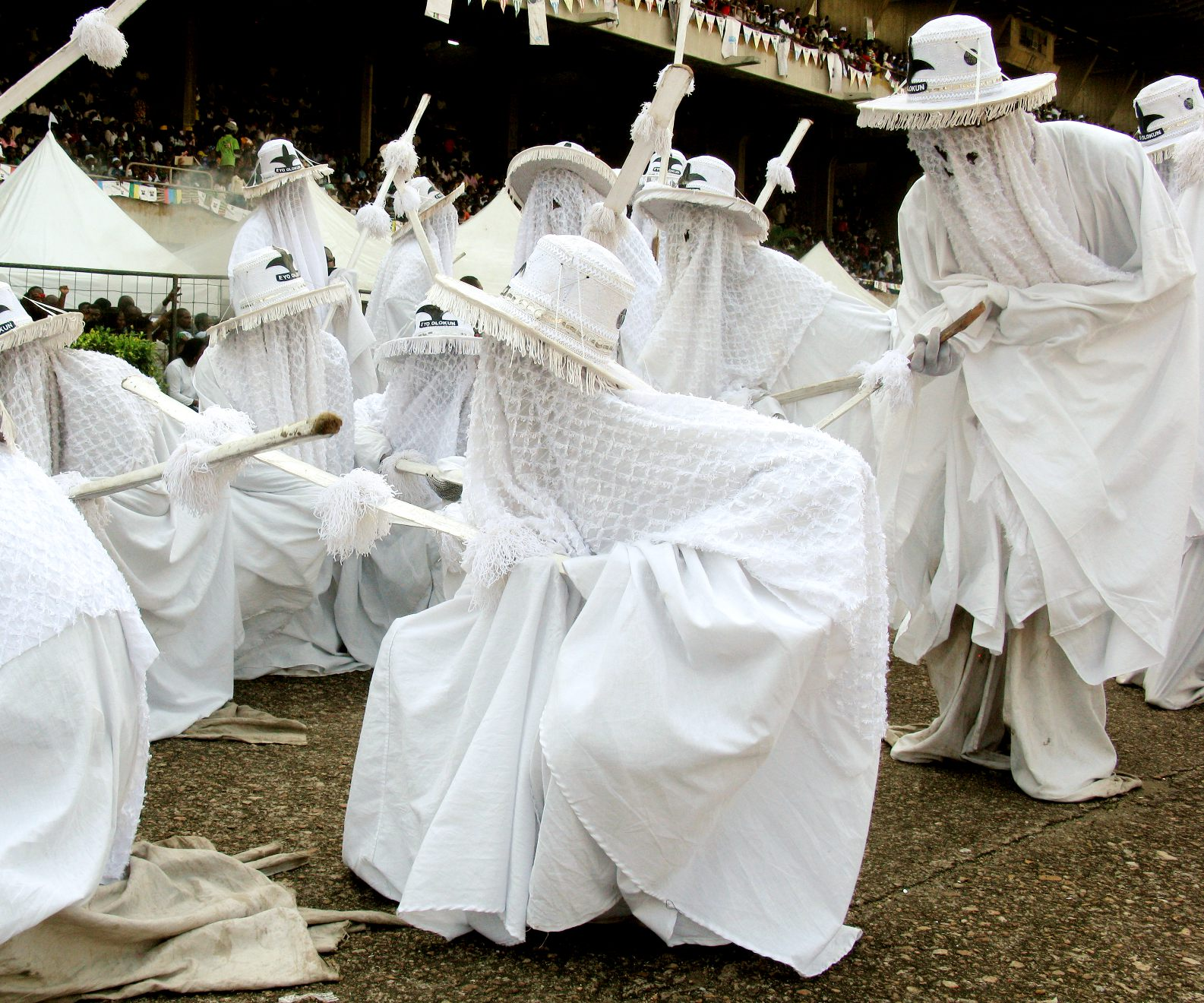
Eyo Olokun masquerades at the Eyo Festival in Lagos, Nigeria

Water deities are "ubiquitous and vitally important in southern Nigeria"; Olókun worship is especially noted in the cities of the Yoruba and Edo people in southwest Nigeria. In West African areas directly adjacent to the coast, Olokun takes a male form among his worshipers, while in the hinterland, Olokun is a female deity.

In Yoruba traditions, Olokun is the god of large water bodies (the ocean), trade, fertility and beads. Olokun is venerated among the Yoruba populations in Ife and Ilesha inland, which are both locations of bodies of water known as 'Okun', as well as in Badagry, Lagos, Atijere, and Itebu along the coast. In 1846 and 1854, Gollmer observed two male Olorisha (votaries) offering a sacrifice including cowries, vegetables, an egg, yam, a dog, a black pigeon and a leopard to Olokun. He was described as the 'God of the ocean and supporter of Oduduwa, the first Oni of Ife, who could also undergo a change of gender'. Olokun has also been described as an early female figure in Ife, whom in her female incarnation — was the senior wife of Emperor Oduduwa. Her rivalry with one of his other wives, Osara or Ọ̀sàrà, is said to have led to her manifesting the Atlantic Ocean (Okun), while Osara became the Lagos lagoon (Osa).

In the area east of Badagry, a shrine of Olokun was described as consisting of a perforated pot placed upside down and surrounded by several smaller ornamental pots filled with water, and the Orisha is described as one of the 'white deities' like Obatala.

In the earliest days of Lagos as a settlement, the Oniru, an Idejo chief was in charge of propitiating Olokun, for whom an annual elaborate festival was performed, to avoid flooding on the ocean banks, while in Ife, the chief priest of Olokun is the Oba Ijio. In one Yoruba account from Ile-Ife, Olokun was Oduduwa's wife and became the sea after leaving him when he took another wife.

At Timbuktu in 1908, German Explorer Leo Frobenius heard of an ancient site with treasures of glass beads, his search lead him to the Olókun grove in Ile-Ife, where archaeological excavations have since revealed a large industry of ancient glass bead manufacturing sites. The glass bead production dates mainly from the eleventh to the fifteenth centuries.

== Candomblé ==
In the Candomblé religion of Brazil, Olokun is venerated as the mother of Yemoja and the owner of the sea. She is recognized in Candomblé terreiros, but not during celebrations. In this respect, Olokun is similar to Odudua and Orunmilá; they held great importance in West Africa but play a minor role in Afro-Brazilian religion. There are no xirê chants dedicated to Olokun as with other orixás. Candomblé initiates recognize the divinity of Olokun but do not hold her as a personal deity. The veneration of Olokun has been revived in the late 20th and early 21st century through visits to Brazil by West African priests.

Olokun is celebrated during the Festival of Yemoja (Festa de Iemanjá).

== Santería ==
Olokun is an orisha in the religion of Santería. Olokun is an androgynous orisha, meaning Olokun is a man and a woman, depending on if it is the Olokun of Ifá or the Olokun of Ocha.

== Pataki (story) ==
According to the Odu Ifa, Olokun became enraged and rose to the surface. As Olokun did this to drown the humans, the orishas went to Orunmila to ask him what to do. Orunmila told them that Ogun needed to create the longest chain he could possibly create. It was ultimately Obatala who had the responsibility of imprisoning Olokun in their domain. Knowing this, Obatala went to Ogun and asked him to make the chain and so he did. Obatala then went down from Ọrun into the ocean and trapped Olokun with it.

== See also ==
- Olokun Festival
- Yemoja
- Oshun
- Mami Wata
