= Zeynab Habib =

Beninese singer of world music (born 1975)

- Oloukèmi
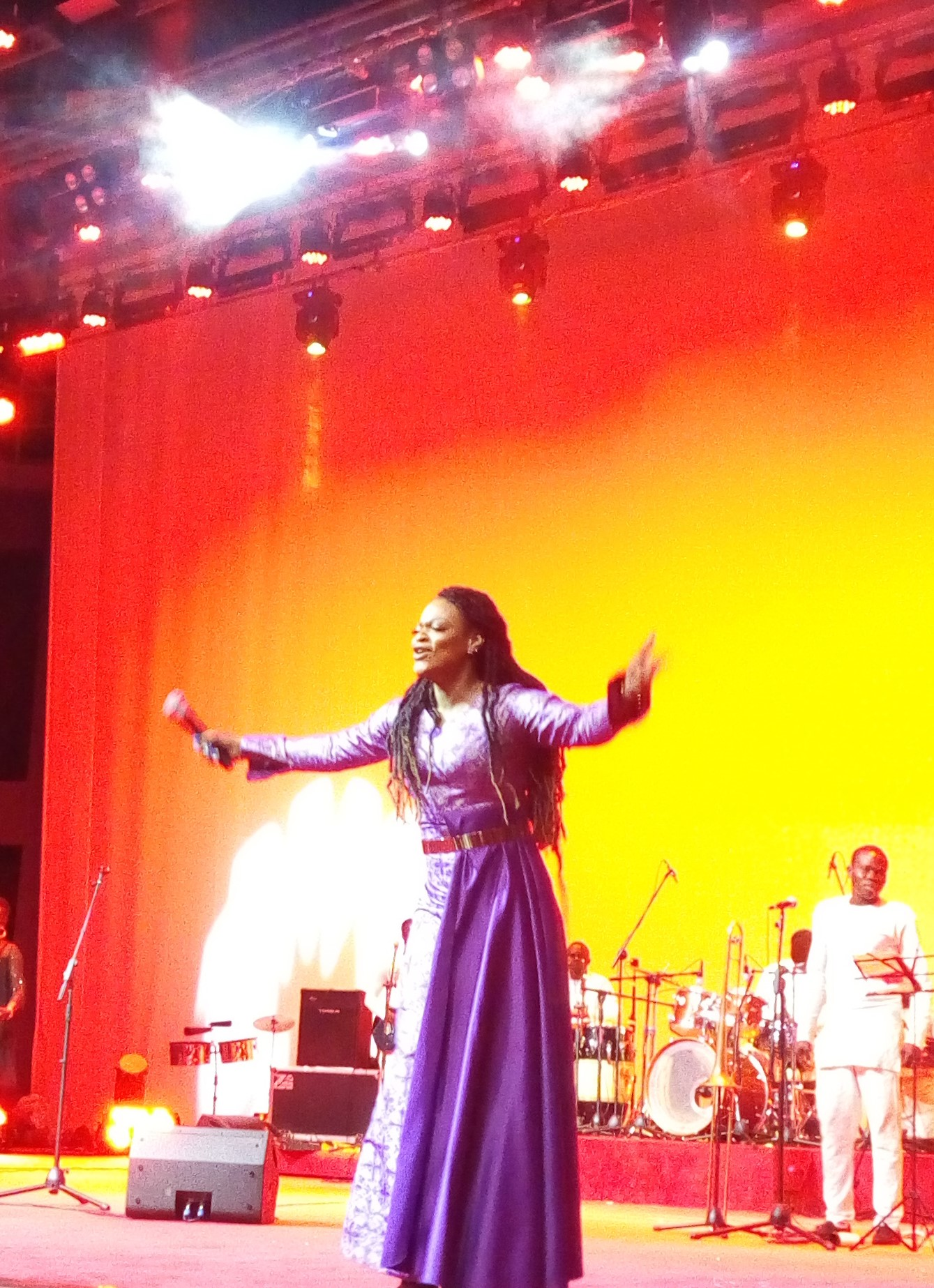
- Born: September 25, 1975 (age 50); Abidjan, Ivory Coast
- Citizenship: Benin
- Occupation: Singer
- Known for: Music
- Awards: Kora Award

Zeynab Habib (born Oloukèmi Zeynab Abibou; September 25, 1975) is a Beninois Yoruba singer of world music born in Abidjan, Ivory Coast. She won the Kora Awards in 2005 in the Category Best Female Artist in West Africa and has been UNICEF's National Goodwill Ambassador since 2007.

== Biography ==
Zeynab Habib's father was an electronics engineer and her mother was a trader. She is the eighth child to her parents and was raised in a large Muslim family, with more than 16 other siblings.

Growing up, Zeynab engaged herself in music related school competitions. She later enrolled at the General Education College of Allada in 1993. Although she completed the series A at her senior secondary school, she dropped out to pursue a career in music.

== Musical career ==
She then started to make local stage appearances including hosting a karaoke bar at Alex's Hotel in Cotonou, Benin, for more than a year.During the cultural days of inter-school competitions, in 1995 she met the orchestra Super Quartz, which she joined. It was the beginning of her musical career, thanks to this group with which she had the opportunity to work alongside several renowned Beninese and international artists. She released her first album in 2002 titled 'Intori,' which in the Yoruba language means 'Because' or 'Why,' an album composed of 14 tracks, and was nominated at the Kora Awards in the Best Female Hope category. Then in 2004, she released her second album entitled 'From One Place to Another,' an album also containing 14 tracks and benefiting from the collaboration of the Congolese song star Lokua Kanza. A few months after its release, the song 'Child' from the album was nominated in two categories at the Kora Awards in South Africa, Best Music Video and Best West African Artist. She won the trophy for Best West African Artist. During a music recital in 2005, she caught the attention of the Super Quartz orchestra, who later recruited her to sing for them. This opened up opportunity for her to meet and partner with notable musicians of that time, including Fifi Rafiatou, Awilo Longomba, Jacky Rapon, Jimi Hope, Nel Oliver (Fespam, Congo), Back Médio, KiriKanta and Madou Isbat.. Zeynab has received international recognition for her music, including from UNICEF. As of October 2015, she was the national ambassador for UNICEF in Benin.In 2011, she released her 3rd album entitled Olukémi, an album containing 16 tracks, including songs such as Bébé yiga, Ayé lé, Chacun à sa chance, and Pour son amour, which experienced a certain success. More than two years after signing with her new production company, Boss Playa Music, based in Abidjan, and after recording a good part of the ongoing album, she makes a return to the forefront of the music scene with the single I no go die in April 2016. This track is ranked number 1 in iTunes sales in several African countries and number 1 for two consecutive weeks on the Hit 30 Africa on Africa numéro 1 radio. In the wake of this, she goes on a European tour in France, Belgium, Germany, and Switzerland, and opens for Maitre Gims' concert in Ouaga. A few weeks later, she is awarded a trophy at the Afrimma Music Awards in Lagos. This is the beginning of an even more international career. A new album is announced for the year 2017, featuring Ivoirians Freddy Assogba, Shado Chris, and Landry Tano, Nigerian Selebobo, and Congolese Fally Ipupa. In 2020, she was nominated at the Afrimma Awards in the category Best Female West Africa and also in the category Video of the Year with the title of the song 'Waa' featuring the Togolese Santrinos Raphael.
