= Elisabeth Apampa =

Togolese journalist (born 1993)

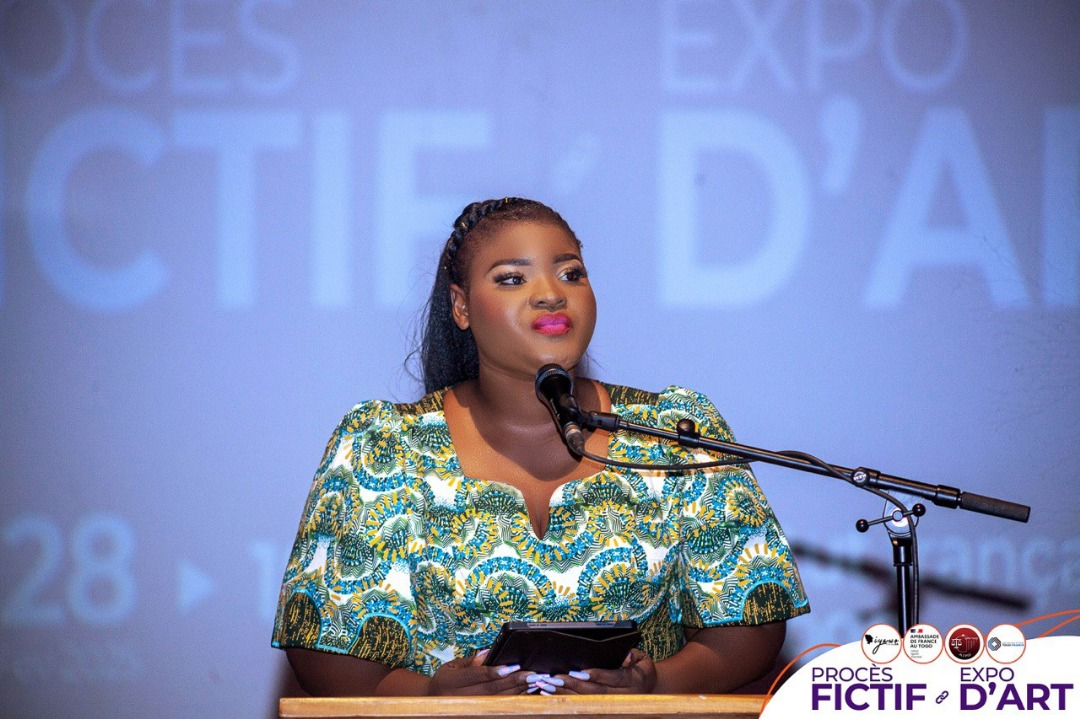
- Apampa in 2025
- Born: 5 February 1993 (age 33); Lomé, Togo
- Occupations: Journalist; Presenter; Activist
- Organization: IYAWO
- Known for: Promotion of Togolese culture Advocacy for women and children's rights

Elisabeth Adéronkè Arikè Apampa (born 5 February 1993) is a Togolese journalist, presenter and producer of cultural programmes. Additionally known for her advocacy for the rights of women and girls, she has been credited with the development of the media in Togo. Apampa is the founder of IYAWO, a non-governmental organisation that promotes women's rights and child protection, and serves as the deputy coordinator of the International Council for Dialogue and Partnership Togo.

== Early life and education ==
Apampa was born and raised in Lomé. After obtaining her baccalauréat, she went on to study for a bachelor's degree in communication and public relations.

== Cultural career ==
Apampa began her career as an intern at Radio Zéphyr, where she went on to become its head of programming. In addition, she hosted several cultural programmes on the station, before starting to make regular appearances on television and online media.

In 2017, Apampa created the IYÉ Festival, which aimed to support emerging artists and promote the Togolese music scene. The festival received support from the Institut Français in Togo, Canal+ Togo and the European Union. Apampa is also the head of her own record label, Kabash. In 2025, Apampa launched the Prix Street Vibes, a musical award for young street musicians in Lomé, with a prize of one million XOF alongside support advancing their career. The first edition, held at the IYÉ Festival, was won by Thierry Komivi Amegnaglo from Adakpamé.

In 2020, Apampa established EA Dreams, an agency specialising in digital strategy, content production and creative marketing.

In 2025, Apampa represented Togo at the 12th annual conference of Visa for Music, a gathering of culture and music industry professionals from Africa and the Middle East, held in Rabat, Morocco. During her time at the conference she met with representatives from diplomatic missions from Morocco, Switzerland and France, and met with the chargé d'affaires for Togo in Morocco to discuss a cultural exchange between the two countries.

== Activism ==
Apampa has stated her goal for women and children to reach their full potential within Togolese society. In 2012, she founded IYAWO, which aimed to promote women's leadership and girl's education, in addition to campaigning against gender-based violence. IYAWO has run various outreach programmes, including raising awareness in schools and providing mentoring services.

In 2025, UNICEF Togo named Apampa as a champion of children's rights in recognition of her commitment to gender equality and access to education. Alongside UNICEF and the French embassy in Togo, she established the "Stop Violence: For Her, With You" (French: Stop aux violences : Pour Elle, Avec Vous) project. Apampa has also collaborated with the United States Agency for International Development with the "Thank You My Heroes" (Merci mon héros) to raise awareness of the rights of women and children.

Also in 2025, Apampa was part of the relaunch of the International Council for Dialogue and Partnership in Togo, which aims to work with local authorities, civil society organisations, businesses and the Togolese diaspora to strengthen local governance and cooperation, mobilise collective intelligence and digital technology, and promote global health and health resilience.

== Recognition ==
In 2022, Apampa was named as one of the 60 most influential women in Africa concerning sustainable development. In 2025, she was named one of the top 100 women of the year by Global Actu.

On 6 January 2025, Apampa was received in an audience with the Prime Minister of Togo, Victoire Tomegah Dogbé, in recognition of her work in the fields of media, social issues and culture.
