= Laura Kutika =

Congolese film director and writer (born 1984)

- Born: Laura Guliamo Luyeye Kutika; August 24, 1984 (age 42); Kinshasa
- Education: University of Kinshasa
- Occupations: Film director, writer
- Years active: 2001-present
- Notable work: Abeti Masikini: Le Combat d'Une Femme

Laura Guliamo Luyeye Kutika (born 24 August 1984) is a Congolese film director and writer.

== Biography ==
Kutika was born in Kinshasa, Zaire. From 2001 to 2003 she was a co-writer for the television series Kinshasa Hôtel. She obtained a literary baccalaureate and studied law at the University of Kinshasa. Before she completed her studies, Kutika decided to pursue her passion for writing and take a training course in television and radio scriptwriting. In 2002, she was a co-writer for a radio soap opera, Center Lokole de Kinshasa. Kutika moved to France in 2003 to work on directing.

In 2009, Kutika was the assistant director of the short film Entre chat et chien by Barbara Barbet. Kutika directed the short film Vas-y fonce in May 2011. In 2012, she wrote her first novel, Seule, face au destin. Kutika directed Moumoune et moi in 2013. Her second book, À nos actes manqués, was published in 2014. In 2015, she co-directed the feature-length documentary Abeti Masikini: Le Combat d'Une Femme along with Ne Kunda Nlaba. The film is a tribute to the musician Abeti Masikini and examines her life and impact. The idea for the film came after Kutika read a biography of Masikani by Berthrand Nguyen Matoko, who advised her on the making of the film. It received the prize for best documentary at the Cinema Au Feminin festival in Kinshasa.

Kutika is the mother of three children. She practices taekwondo. Kutika is the president of the humanitarian association "Le nouveau rire".

== Filmography ==
- 2001-2003: Kinshasa Hôtel (writer)
- 2009: Entre chat et chien (assistant director)
- 2011: Vas-y fonce (director)
- 2012: Ndouleman (assistant director)
- 2013: Moumoune et moi (director)
- 2015: Abeti Masikini: Le Combat d'Une Femme (writer/producer/director)
