= Yvan =

Yvan is a given name. Notable people with the name include:

- Jacques-Yvan Morin, GOQ (1931–2023), politician in Quebec, Canada
- Marc-Yvan Côté (born 1947), former Quebec politician and Cabinet Minister for the Quebec Liberal Party
- Maurice-Yvan Sicard (1910–2000), French journalist and far right political activist
- Yvan Attal (born 1965), Israeli-born French actor and director
- Yvan Bernier (born 1960), member of the Canadian House of Commons from 1993 to 2000
- Yvan Blot (1948–2018), French conservative political figure
- Yvan Bordeleau (born 1942), the Member of the National Assembly (MNA) Quebec, Canada, for Acadie from 1989 to 2007
- Yvan Bourgis (born 1979), French football defender currently playing for Stade Brest 29 in the French Ligue 2
- Yvan Colonna, Corsican nationalist convicted of assassinating the prefect of Corsica, Claude Erignac on the February 6, 1998
- Yvan Cournoyer (born 1943), retired Canadian hockey right winger who played in the National Hockey League
- Yvan Craipeau (1911–2001), French Trotskyist activist
- Yvan Decock (born 1941), Belgian sprint canoeist who competed in the early 1960s
- Yvan Delporte (1928–2007), Belgian comics writer, was editor-in-chief of Spirou magazine
- Yvan Ducharme (1937–2013), québécois humorist and actor
- Yvan Dutil, Canadian astrophysicist who created a noise-resistant coding system for extraterrestrial messages
- Yvan Goll, born Isaac Lange (1891–1950), French-German poet who wrote in both French and German
- Yvan Joly (born 1960), retired Canadian professional ice hockey forward
- Yvan Kibundu (born 1989), French midfielder
- Yvan Kyrlya (real name Kirill Ivanovich Ivanov) (1909–1943), Mari Soviet actor and poet
- Yvan Lachaud (born 1954), member of the National Assembly of France
- Yvan Lambatan, singer from Baguio City and former scholar of Pinoy Dream Academy
- Yvan Le Bolloc'h (born 1961), French television and radio host and actor
- Yvan Loubier (born 1959), Canadian politician and one of the founders of the Bloc Québécois
- Yvan Muller (born 1969), French auto racing driver most noted for success in Touring Car and Ice racing
- Yvan Patry (1948–1999), Québécois documentary filmmaker
- Yvan Ponton (born 1945), Quebec actor, commentator and television host
- Yvan Quénin (1920–2009), French basketball player
- Yvan Quentin (born 1970), retired Swiss football defender
- Yvan Rajoarimanana (born 1988), Malagasy footballer currently plays for JS Saint-Pierroise
- Yvan Randriasandratriniony, Malagasy politician, President of Tiako i Madagasikara (TIM), the ruling party
- Yvan Ylieff (born 1941), Belgian politician of the Francophone Socialist Party
