= Music of Togo =

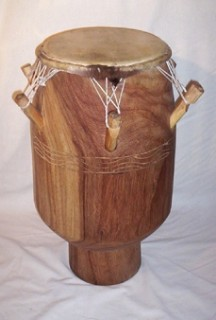
A Togolese drum

The music of Togo has produced a number of internationally known popular entertainers including Bella Bellow, Akofah Akussah, Afia Mala, Itadi Bonney, Wellborn, King Mensah and Jimi Hope.

== National music ==
The Togolese national anthem is Salut à toi, pays de nos aïeux (Land of our forefathers), written by Alex Casimir-Dosseh. From 1979 to 1992 it was replaced by an anthem composed by the party of the Rally of the Togolese People. French is the official and commercial language of Togo.

== Traditional music ==
Togo's southern plain is its most populous area, where the capital, Lomé, is situated on the Gulf of Guinea but, like its neighbours, Ghana and Benin, its territory extends hundreds of kilometres northward, passing through a central hill region into the northern savanna that borders Burkina Faso. Its population of over 6 million people, which is 65% rural and agrarian, is composed of about 21 ethnic groups. Approximately 51% of the population has indigenous beliefs, 29% is Christian, and 20% Muslim.

The two most populous language groups are the Ewe in the south (about 32% of the population) and the Kabye in the north (22% of the population). Gen or Mina is the second major language in the south, closely related to Ewe: most southern peoples use these two languages, which are spoken in commercial sectors throughout Togo. Fon, another related language, as well as Aja, are also spoken in the south: the Ewe had entered Togo from the east, and Akan people from the west, several centuries before Europeans arrived.

Folk songs of fishermen in the south may be accompanied by bells such as the gankogui and frikiwa. Folk songs in Ewe and Kabye, are common, Fon and Yoruba songs also occur. Togolese music includes a great variety of percussion-led dance music. All over Togo drums are used, by Christians and Muslims as well, to celebrate all major events of life and for festivals like the Expesoso or Yeke Yeke festival. In the Aneho district alone drums in use include the agbadja, ageche, aziboloe, kple, amedjeame, akpesse, grekon, blekete and adamdom. There are numerous rhythms in Togo, each area having its own special beat.

In the central hills Tem and the Ghana–Togo Mountain languages are spoken. Dagomba is the second most common language in the north, where other Gur languages such as Mossi and Gourma are also found. The culture of these northern people extends far into Togo's neighbouring states, Ghana and Burkina Faso. The Dagomba people play stringed instruments such as the kologo (xalam) and the gonjey), flute and voice, with poly-rhythms clapped or played on the talking drum, gourd drums or brekete. The tradition of gyil xylophone music is also common, with several players producing intricate cycling rhythms. Other folk instruments include the bow. Music in the northern styles is mostly set to a minor pentatonic scale and melisma plays an important part in melodic and vocal styles, along with a long history of griot praise-singing traditions.

Togolese dances include kamou, soo, tchimou, the southern royal djokoto, the war dances kpehouhuon and atsina, the hunters' dance adewu, the stilt dance tchebe, the miming masseh, as well as regional dances like the coastal sakpate and the kaka.

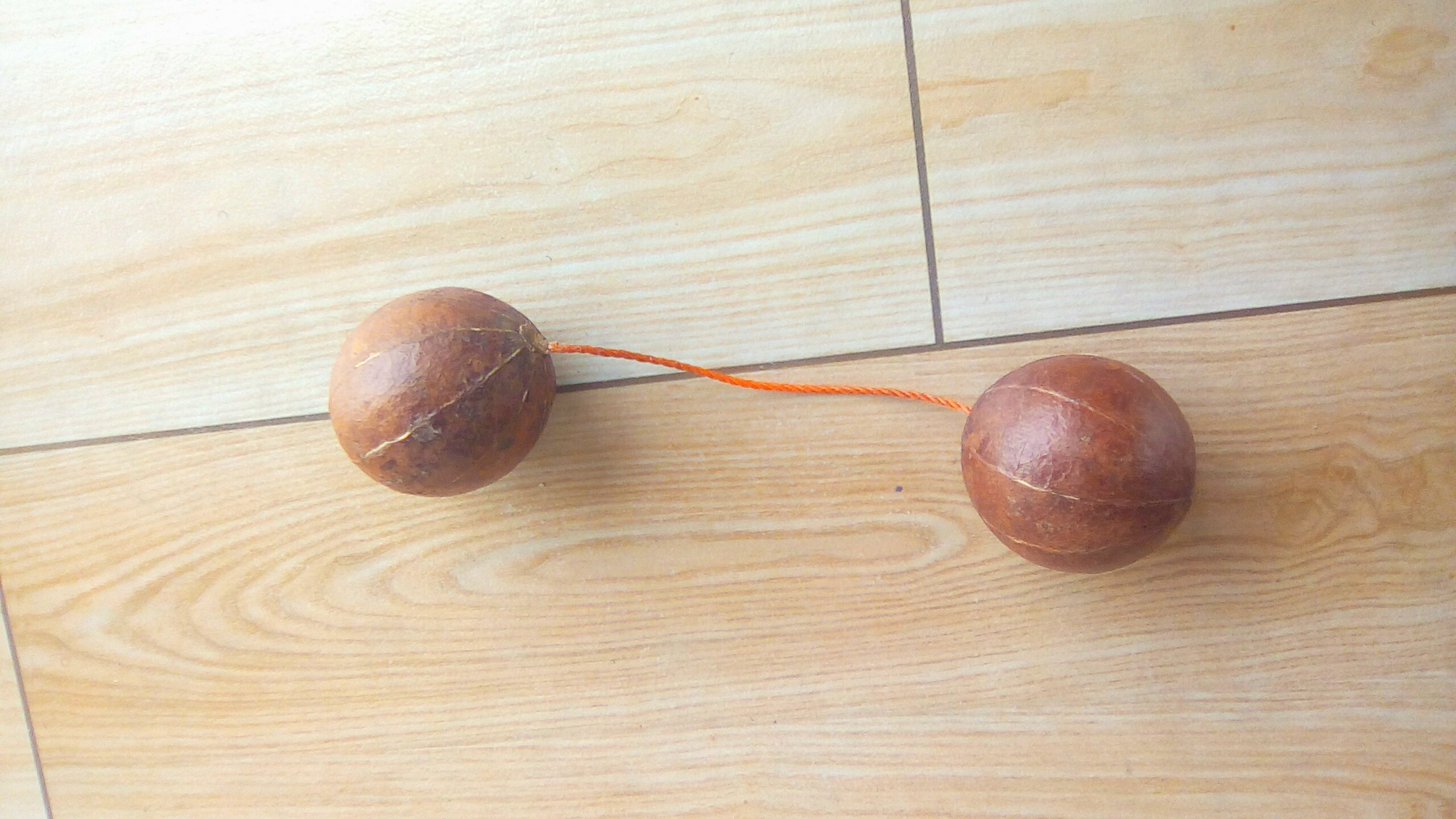
Music instrument Televi

== Popular music ==
Internationally known performer King Mensah, a former performer at the Ki-Yi M'Bock Theatre in Abidjan, toured Europe and Japan before opening his own show in French Guiana and then moving to Paris and forming a band called Favaneva. Peter Solo The man of Vodoo Game Music from Togo The idea of integrating these haunting lines, sung in honor of the Divinities, to an energetic 1970s Afro-funk was an obvious extension in Peter's mind of the analogy he found between this voodoo tradition and trance inducers such as Blues, Funk, as well as the Rhythm'n Blues of James Brown, Otis Redding and Wilson Picket.Peter heard this new sound coming through him and named it Vodoo Game.

Bella Bellow is Togo's best-known musician, and is often compared with South Africa's Miriam Makeba. Her career began after representing her country in 1966 at the Dakar Arts Festival. She began a career singing love-oriented ballads in 1969, when she worked with Togolese-French producer Gérard Akueson and soon appeared on French national radio and then the prestigious Olympia Music Hall. She toured across much of the world before dying in a car accident in 1973, just after recording the hit collaboration with Manu Dibango "Sango Jesus Christo". In Bellow's wake came a wave of female singers, including Mabah, Afia Mala, Fifi Rafiatou and Ita Jourias. Other musicians include Jimi Hope. Hope is known for politically incisive lyrics and an innovative rock-based style.

Hip hop is on the rise, and 2003 saw the first Togo hip hop awards ceremony. In 2025, Elisabeth Apampa launched the Prix Street Vibes to offer support to rising young musicians in Lomé.

The group Toofan, founded in 2005 in the capital city of Lomé, is popular across Africa and Europe. Toofan plays a musical style they call "Ogbragada", a combination of Rap and Urban music. They have toured across Africa, Europe, North America, and the Caribbean. The group popularized a dance called "Gweta" Toofan has been recognized for their philanthropic and charitable initiatives in Togo.

Folk metal scene of Togo, counts one band under the name Arka'n Asrafokor.

== See also ==
- Sub-Saharan African music traditions
- Rhythm in Sub-Saharan Africa
- West African music
