= Bella Bellow =

Togolese singer (1945–1973)

- Bellow

Background information
- Born: Georgette Nafiatou Adjoavi; January 1, 1945; Tsévié, Togo
- Died: December 10, 1973 (aged 28) Lilikopé, Togo
- Genres: Blues, African music
- Occupation: Singer-songwriter
- Years active: 1960–1973

Bella Bellow (born Georgette Nafiatou Adjoavi Bellow; 1 January 1945 – 10 December 1973), was a Togolese singer-songwriter. Born in Tsévié, she died in a road accident in Lilikopé, a village between Tsévié and Agbélouvé, at the age of 28.

From childhood, her talent for music and her voice were noticed at home and at school, where she performed at festivities. Her musical career began at the French Cultural Centre in Lomé before she was invited to perform at the Dahomey independence celebrations in 1965. The following year, her participation in the first World Festival of Black Arts in Dakar, representing Togo, brought her to international attention.

In 1968, her former teacher Paul Ahyi introduced her to Togolese singer Gérard Akueson, who became her producer. He put her in contact with Cameroonian saxophonist Manu Dibango, with whom she built her repertoire and recorded her first and only album, Rockia, released in 1969. Dibango also accompanied her in her early stage appearances and during the promotion of her album in France.

She performed on international stages, including the Olympia in Paris and the Maracanã stadium in Rio de Janeiro. Always dressed in wax print fabric, she sang mainly in her mother tongue, Mina (or Gen). With her husky voice, she helped spread Togolese and African music in the early 1970s. Returning to Togo in December 1973, she died the day after her arrival in a road accident at the age of 28. Although her career was brief, she influenced many artists, including Beninese singer Angélique Kidjo, who has covered Bella Bellow's songs such as Zelie and Blewu, performing the latter at the centenary of the 1918 Armistice. After her death, the BCEAO honoured her by printing her image on the 10,000 CFA franc banknote. She also appears on several Togolese stamps, and the anniversary of her death is commemorated each year in the country.

== Biography ==
=== Childhood and education ===
Georgette Nafiatou Adjoavi Bellow was born on 1 January 1945 in Tsévié, a town located 35 kilometres (22 mi) north of Lomé, to a Togolese father of Nigerian descent and a mother of Ghanaian origins. Nicknamed toutouvi, she was the eldest of seven siblings. She took on significant household and caregiving responsibilities within her large family. In a family household of around thirty children, she directed all domestic and academic activities, demanding of others — including older brothers — expectations she held for her siblings. In the evenings, after chores, she would sing little tunes or tell stories, revealing another side of herself to her siblings.

When she began composing little songs for school festivities, her mother sewed her stage costumes with their help. On Saturdays, with no school, she did the laundry at the stream with her siblings and sang with them the songs her mother had taught her in Ewe and Kotokoli. She sang tunes from different parts of the country, learning most of the languages of Togo through song. A school orchestra was created for her, with which she gave a concert at the end of the 1963 school year before a large crowd.

Bella Bellow spent part of her childhood in Agoè-Nyivé, one of the 13 municipalities of Grand Lomé, and began her schooling in 1950 with the Sisters of the Catholic School Notre-Dame des Apôtres in Lomé. She obtained her primary school certificate (CEPE) in 1958. She enrolled for secondary school at the lycée in Sokodé and then at the Lycée Bonnecarrère in Lomé, completing her junior secondary certificate (BEPC) in 1966. From 1966 to 1968, she undertook secretarial training in Abidjan, Ivory Coast, where she also took solfège classes at the Institut des Arts.

=== Career ===
==== Early career ====
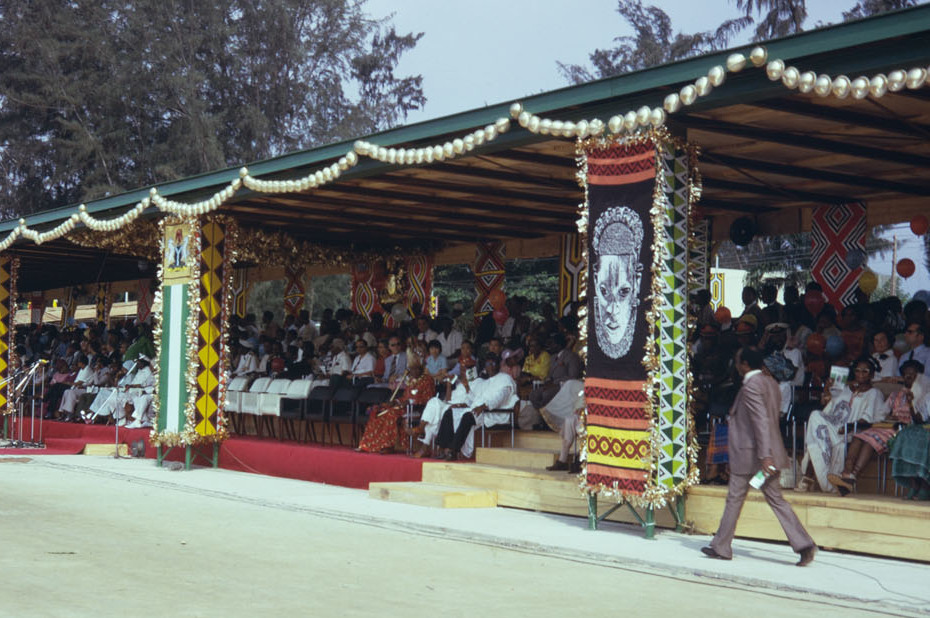
World Festival of Black Arts in Dakar.

In 1962, an artistic contest was organised between Bella Bellow and Julie Akofa Akoussah at the French Cultural Centre (CCF) in Lomé.

For the national independence celebrations in August 1965, Bella Bellow was invited to Cotonou by the president of the Republic of Dahomey, Hubert Maga, to sing before an audience that included German president Ludwig Erhard, United Nations Secretary-General U Thant, and Ivorian president Félix Houphouët-Boigny, who offered her a scholarship to come to Abidjan at the end of her performance.

In 1966, a duo concert with her brother Désiré was organised at the French Cultural Centre in Lomé, during which she performed the song Mawudeka ye lanya ("God alone will know it"). That year, at the age of 21, she was exempted from the oral examination of the BEPC in order to represent Togo at the first World Festival of Black Arts in Dakar, Senegal, accompanied by her compatriot Julie Akofa Akoussah. Among those present at the festival were Josephine Baker, Langston Hughes, and Duke Ellington. She gained considerable recognition following the event.

While studying secretarial skills in Abidjan, she attracted the attention of Ivorian media through an appearance on a television show on the Radio-Télévision Ivoirienne. She also took part in a concert at the CCF in Lomé alongside Julien Clerc. In 1967, she performed at a gala organised by the Office du Tourisme Africain in Geneva, Switzerland.

==== Meeting Gérard Akueson ====
Gérard Akueson, a Togolese singer and the first African phonographic publisher in France, went on a musical tour of West Africa, which brought him to Togo in 1968. The country had few artist managers at the time, and Paul Ahyi, Bella Bellow's former drawing teacher at the lycée in Sokodé, who knew Akueson's Akue record label, asked him to meet her. She sang Zelie for Akueson, who stopped her after barely a minute and told Paul Ahyi that he had found a remarkable singer. Akueson praised her vocal qualities and subsequently signed a contract with her in Paris. At the end of his musical tour, and back in Paris, Akueson signed a contract with Bellow, who joined him in the French capital at the end of her studies in 1968. Akueson looked for a first name that would work better as a stage name internationally than her birth name "Georgette" and suggested "Bella", which she accepted.

==== Collaboration with Manu Dibango ====
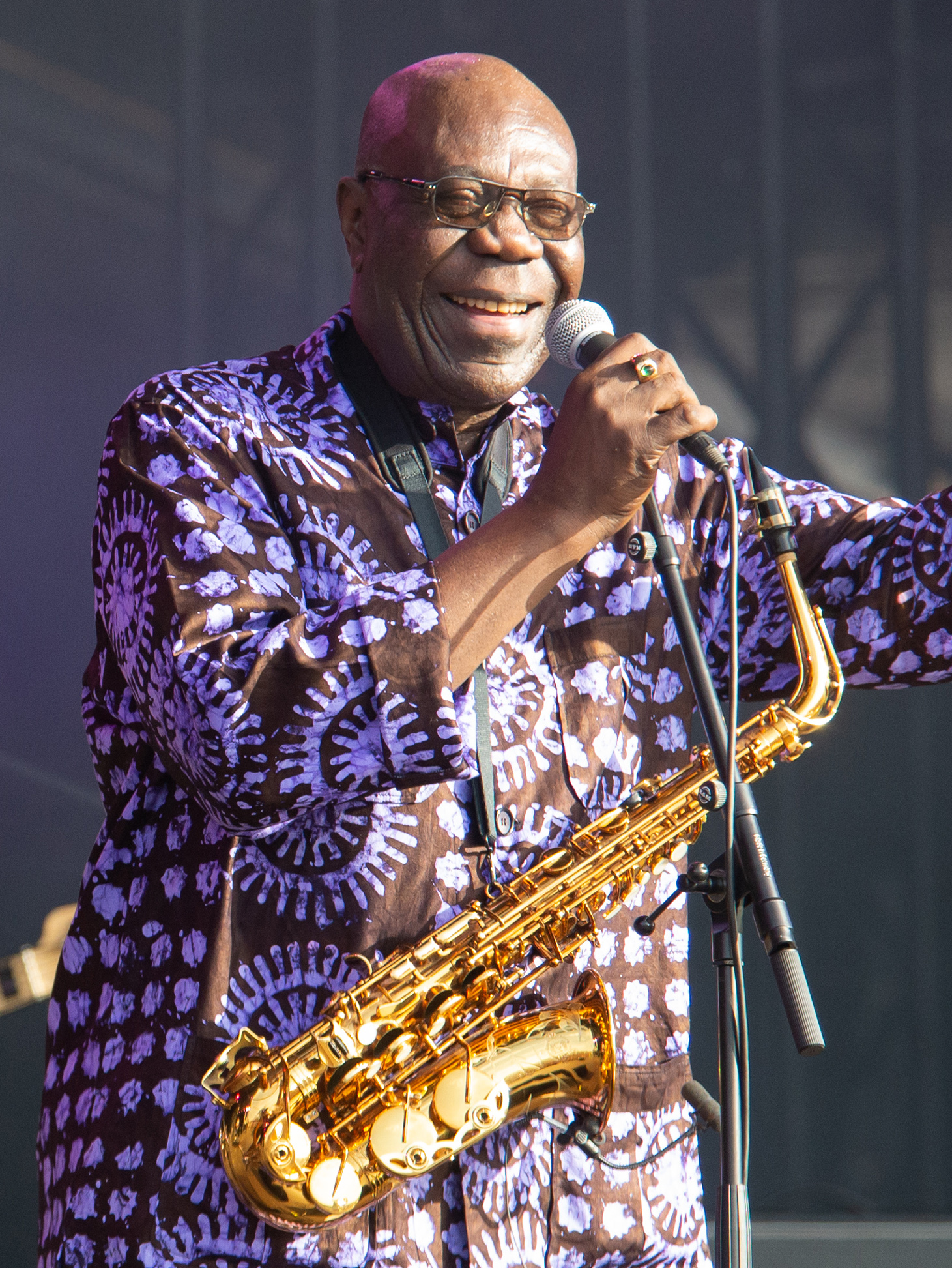
Manu Dibango (pictured in 2019), Bella Bellow's musical accompanist.

Gérard Akueson shortly afterwards asked Manu Dibango to record with Bella Bellow.

That was the first time I listened to an African girl with a beautiful, really beautiful voice — you can think about Ella Fitzgerald and people like that, same type of clear voice, pure voice and in tune always [...] with a lot of feeling concerning African songs.

— Manu Dibango.

A secretarial job was arranged for her in Paris. During this period she spent a great deal of time with Dibango at his home, working on her songs with him at the piano, trying out different approaches — more of an exchange than a lesson, according to him — so that the final result would sound natural rather than rehearsed. Manu Dibango, in the documentary L'éternelle Bella Bellow, stated: "I took care of her musically [...]. She was like my daughter. My wife and I had adopted her."

==== Album ====
Accompanied by Manu Dibango on keyboards, Slim Pezin on guitar, and Jeanot Mandengue on bass — musicians assembled by Akueson — Bella Bellow recorded her first and only album, Rockia, arranged by Manu Dibango. It was the first pop album in Ewe. The first song recorded for the album, "Zelie", was well-received upon release, as was the title track Rockia. These were followed by tracks such as Blewu, which addresses the themes of patience and life after death, and Denyigban, an ode to her homeland, Togo. The lyrics of her songs draw on traditional folk tales and biblical texts, and also explore psychological themes.

Manu Dibango noted that the album was not purely African but also contained American influences, the result being one that showcased her voice and set her apart. She sang in Mina, and her music was influenced by blues, gospel, and bossa nova.

On the back cover of the first single from the album, Gérard Akueson wrote:

During my previous African tour, I had the pleasure of hearing Bella for the first time. I was immediately struck by this pure and warm voice. The experts are already in agreement: this is a singer who will very quickly rise to the international stage.

==== International career ====
In 1969, Bella Bellow released her first and only album on the Akue label, arranged by Manu Dibango. As conductor for Nino Ferrer, he had her perform on the television programmes Pulsations (of which he was the musical director) and Discorama hosted by Denise Glaser. He also organised concerts throughout France to raise her profile. She was among the very few artists from Francophone Africa to be broadcast on French radio at the time. They toured clubs and festivals together for two years.

In 1969, she took part in the "Night of Brotherhood" organised in tribute to Martin Luther King, held at the Olympia.

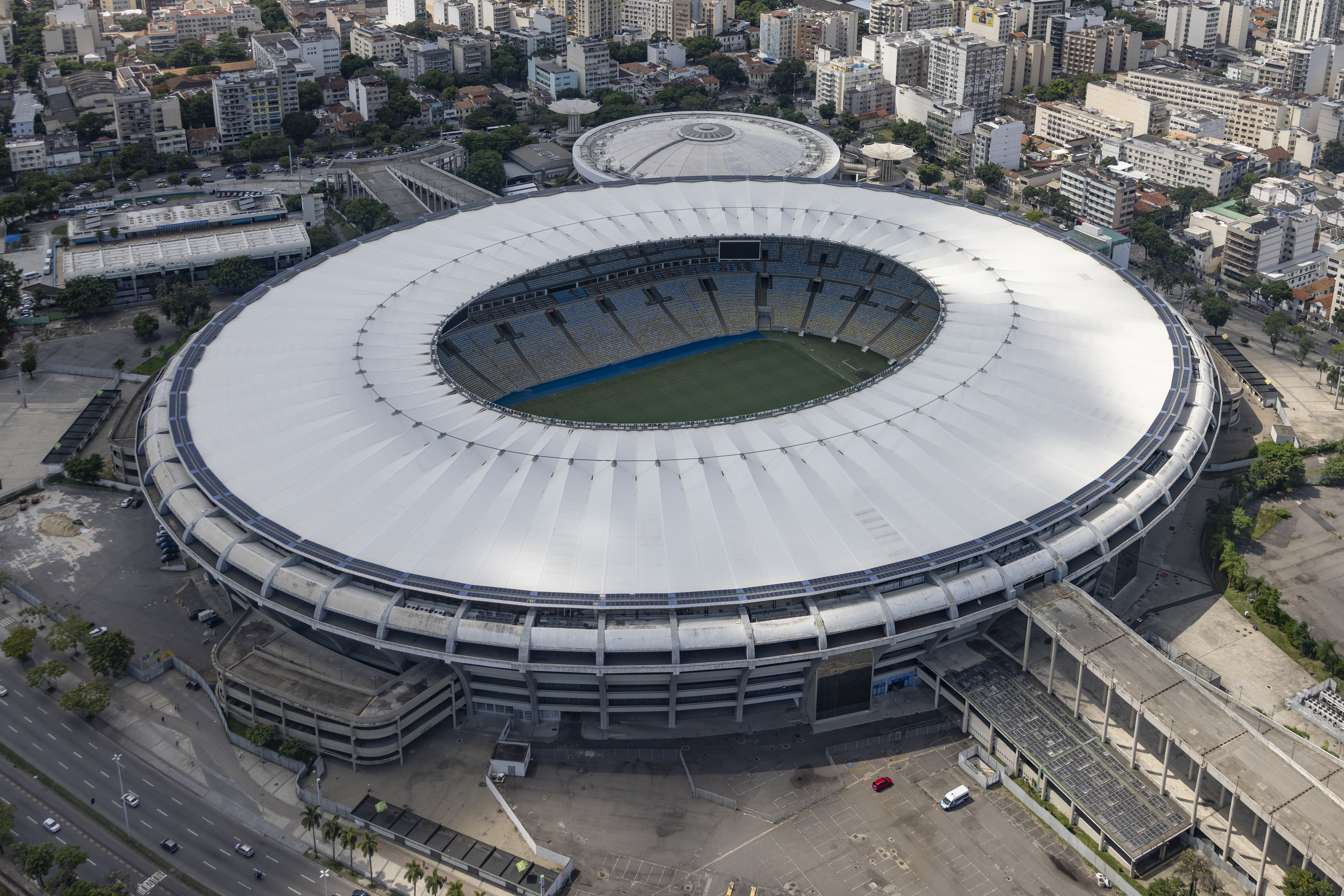
Maracanã Stadium, Rio de Janeiro, the largest stage Bella Bellow performed on.

At the Pan-African Cultural Festival in Algiers in 1969, Bella Bellow met her idol Miriam Makeba, who congratulated her warmly. That same year, she signed her first major contract to perform at the fourth popular song festival in Rio de Janeiro, Brazil, appearing alongside Rika Zaraï, Johnny Hallyday, Nana Mouskouri, and Herbert Léonard, among others, at the Maracanã stadium, which held 120,000 spectators. The Brazilian audience was known to be unforgiving towards artists it did not appreciate, and Bellow was required to perform with fifty musicians, whereas she usually performed with four or five. Akueson therefore suggested that she begin singing from backstage when her name was announced before walking onto the stage. In agreement with the sound engineer, the orchestra did not play until she stepped onto the stage. She performed Zelie before a very silent audience until the end of the set. All the journalists flocked backstage to see her afterwards; Pelé came backstage to congratulate her and came to see her again at a reception the following day. At the Maracanãzinho (Little Maracanã), with a capacity of over 10,000, she performed Bem-bem, which appeared on one of the other singles in her discography.

In 1970, she took part in the musical gala organised at the OCAM Summit in Kinshasa. That same year, she became the first Togolese artist to perform at the Olympia in Paris.

She subsequently performed in Yugoslavia, Belgium, Greece, and toured major African cities, principally in French-speaking countries such as Togo, Benin, Ivory Coast, Cameroon, Mali, Gabon, and Congo. She also performed in Guadeloupe and French Guiana, where she earned the nickname "blueswoman of Africa".

In 1971, she ended her collaboration with Gérard Akueson and took control of her own career. On 20 January 1972, in Atakpamé, she married Togolese magistrate Théophile Jamier-Lévy, and gave birth to their only daughter, Nadia Elsa. After a pause in her career, she returned with Dasi Ko, a song with a different artistic direction from Dibango that diverged from his usual style, and which was her last recorded song.

In November 1972, a Franco-Togolese evening was organised at the French Cultural Centre in Lomé. She presented her own orchestra, named Gabada — after a traditional Togolese rhythm — and performed several songs: Miwonovi lagbeme, Azikiri, Miangoma Bombe, among others. She undertook a musical tour in Bonn, Germany, in 1973.

On stage, she held only her flywhisk and always dressed in wax print fabric, with a matching turban.

=== Death ===
Bella Bellow returned to Togo at her husband's request to spend Christmas with her family in Atakpamé. The day after her arrival in Togo, she died in a car accident in her Ford Capri on 10 December 1973 in Lilikopé, 50 kilometres (31 mi) north of Lomé. She had been preparing to tour the United States with Manu Dibango.

The circumstances of the accident were never fully clarified. Bella Bellow had not been wearing her seatbelt. The car overturned after rolling several times, and she was thrown from the vehicle, her head striking the asphalt. She died almost immediately from a cerebral haemorrhage. Years after the accident, Francis Bellow, Bella Bellow's brother, stated that the driver of her car had apologised to him: "I'm sorry, I fell asleep."

Bella Bellow was buried on 13 December 1973 at the Catholic cemetery of Bè-Plage in Lomé.

According to her producer Akueson, she died before African music became widely popular beyond folklore, particularly with the international success of Soul Makossa by Manu Dibango.

== Influence and tributes ==
=== Influence ===
Bella Bellow influenced many artists across the African continent, the most prominent of whom is Angélique Kidjo.

==== Angélique Kidjo ====
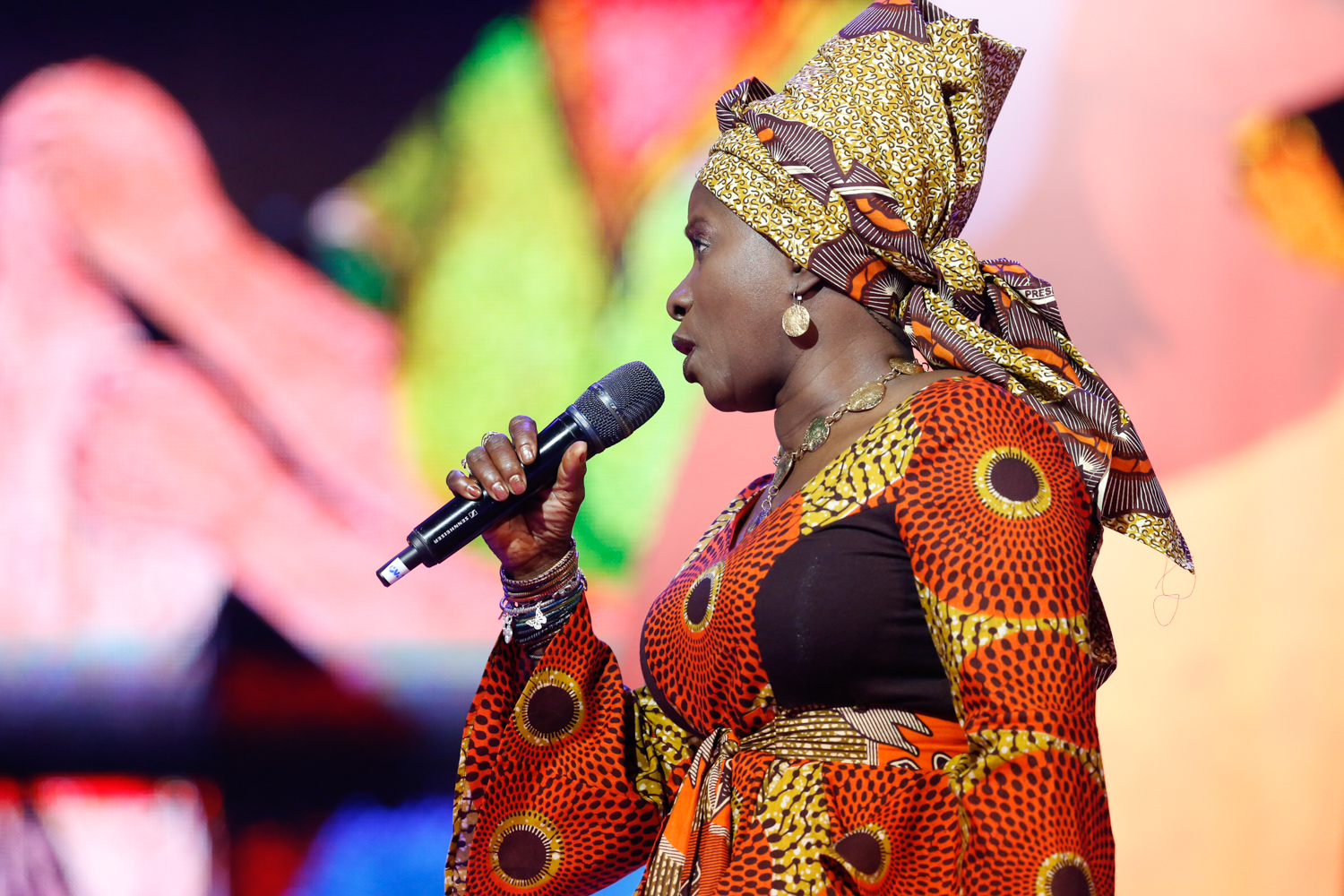
Angélique Kidjo (pictured in 2014), who was profoundly influenced by Bella Bellow.

Angélique Kidjo discovered Bella Bellow through the song Rockia, which was played everywhere on the radio and at celebrations in Benin. She then listened to the entire album of the same name, enraptured, wondering how she could ever sing like her.

When Angélique was thirteen years old, Bella Bellow went to Benin to perform at the Beach Club, a nightclub belonging to a friend of her father. She begged her father to let her go despite her young age and obtained his agreement on the condition that she remain at the bar to watch the performance. Angélique did not sleep that night and admitted defeat, feeling she could not pursue that career when others like Bella Bellow had such stage presence. Bella Bellow died shortly after that performance. Shocked and in denial, Angélique Kidjo named her very first song Bella Bellow, on her 1981 album Pretty. In 2014, she covered Blewu for her album Eve.

Bella Bellow was the first star Angélique Kidjo had admired, before she discovered Aretha Franklin and Miriam Makeba. Kidjo has cited Bellow as a major primary influence on her musical career.

The impact that she had on me is elegance too and her grace. You can be sexy on stage without being naked. And that is something I learned unconsciously because when I look back at my career [...], the African fabric, the inspiration behind that fabric is Bella Bellow.

— Angélique Kidjo.

==== Other influenced artists ====
Bella Bellow also influenced Togolese artists such as Julie Akofa Akoussah, Vicky Bila, Afia Mala, and Vanessa Worou. Singer-songwriter Vanessa Worou is often compared to Bella Bellow, and some consider her to be her true heir. She regards Bella Bellow as her idol and role model. In December 2008, she paid tribute to her with the song Ma Bella. On the album Benin passion vol.4 : les sucrées de Bella Bellow by RFI correspondent Jean-Luc Aplogan, she covered the tracks Zelie, Bouyelele, Nye Dzi, Lafoulou, Rockia, Denyigba, and Dasi ko.

=== Tributes ===
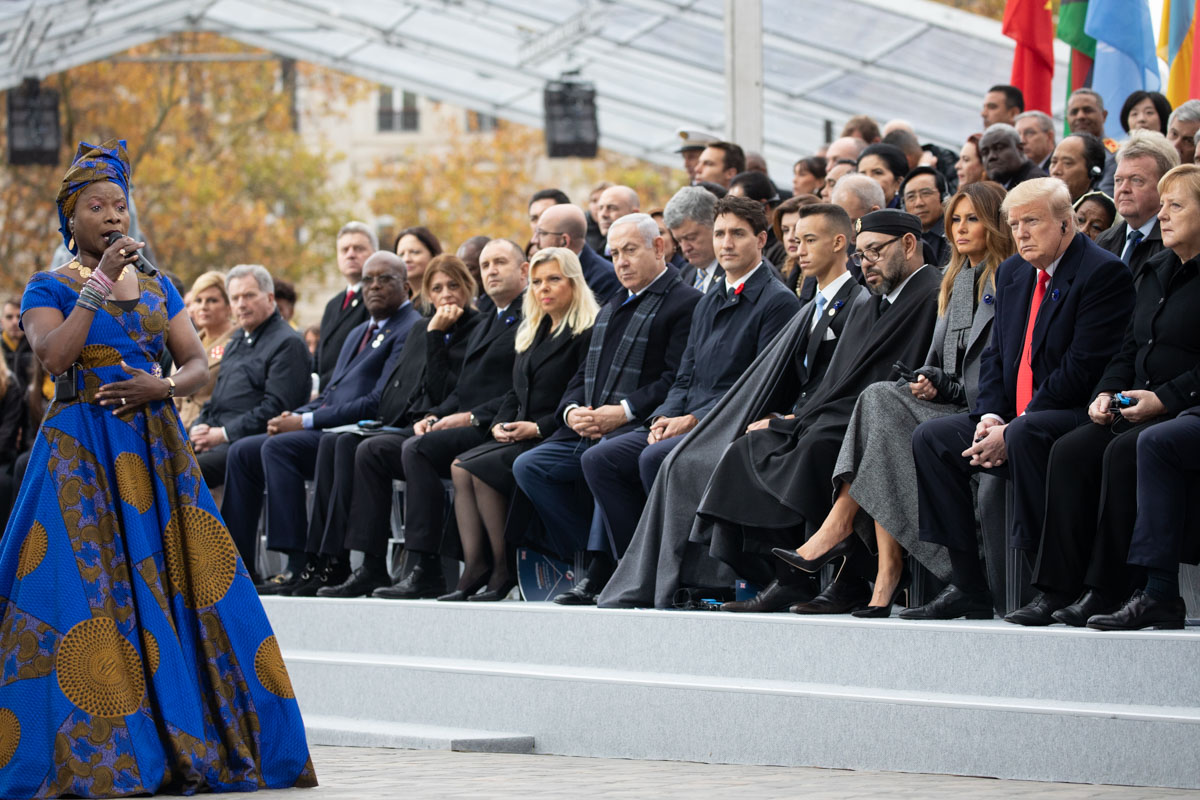
Angélique Kidjo performing Blewu before heads of state at the centenary of the Armistice in 2018.

Bella Bellow appears on the front of the former 10,000 CFA franc banknote, issued between 1979 and 1992 by the Central Bank of West African States (BCEAO). She is also depicted on several Togolese postage stamps.

On 10 December 2003, a major celebration was held in her honour. The Bella Bellow Cup, a women's football competition, was named after her to mark the occasion. The cup ran for four editions until 2007.

On the occasion of the fortieth anniversary of her passing, a foundation bearing her name was officially launched on 14 December 2013 in Lomé. The foundation, chaired by Nadia Elsa Agbodjan, Bella Bellow's only daughter, aims to promote the development and improvement of living conditions for Togolese youth and underprivileged children, as well as the emancipation of African women. It also promotes the development of music.

An orchestra named Bella Bellow, composed entirely of women, was created in her honour. It performs regularly on Togolese and regional stages, with the aim of paying tribute to heroines of the continent.

Beninese artist Angélique Kidjo performed Blewu at the ceremony marking the centenary of the 1918 Armistice on 11 November 2018 beneath the Arc de Triomphe, before approximately 70 heads of state.

In June 2019, the Bella Bellow University Stage, a 1500 seats performance venue, was inaugurated at the University of Lomé, Togo's main university.

During a national tribute organised to celebrate her memory, running from December 2023 into spring 2024, Kossi Gbényo Lamadokou, Togo's Minister of Culture and Tourism, announced that, through an emergency procedure, copyright protection over her works had been extended from fifty to seventy years post-mortem, in order to prevent them from entering the public domain in 2024. They are thus protected for an additional 20 years, until 2044. On the same occasion, the Société des postes du Togo unveiled a new series of stamps bearing her image.

== Discography ==
- In 1968, she released her only album, Rockia, in Paris. She was accompanied by a team comprising Cameroonian Manu Dibango on saxophone, keyboards, and arrangement, Jeannot Mandengue on bass, Ben's on drums, and Slim Pezin on guitar.
- In 1977, a memorial album was released on the Sonafric label, which specialised in African music:

Bella Bellow : album souvenir
| No. | Title | Writer(s) | Length |
|---|---|---|---|
| 1. | "Denyigban" | Bella Bellow |
| 2. | "Zelie" | Bella Bellow |
| 3. | "Lafoulou" | Bella Bellow |
| 4. | "Nye Dzi" | Bella Bellow |
| 5. | "Bem-bem" | Bella Bellow |
| 6. | "Rockia" | Bella Bellow |
| 7. | "Bouyelele" | Bella Bellow |
| 8. | "O Se Nye" | Bella Bellow |
| 9. | "Awula" | Bella Bellow |
| 10. | "Blewu" | Bella Bellow |

== Notes and references ==
=== Webography ===
- Ata Ahli Ahebla (6 January 2018). "Bella Bellow: Beloved Songbird of Togo". BBC. Archived from the original (Radio) on 2 March 2024.
- "Entretenir la flamme de Bella Bellow". RFI Musique (in French). 10 December 2018.

=== Bibliography ===
- Jeune Afrique Numéros 573-590. Société africaine de presse. 1972.
- Akyeampong, Emmanuel Kwaku; Gates, Jr, Henry Louis, eds. (2012). Dictionary of African Biography. Vol. 1–6. Oxford University Press. p. 2720.
- Murphy, David (2016). The First World Festival of Negro Arts, Dakar 1966: Contexts and Legacies. Liverpool University Press. p. 246. ISBN 9781781383513.
- Seely, Jennifer C.; Decalo, Samuel, eds. (2021). Historical Dictionary of Togo. Rowman & Littlefield. p. 466. ISBN 9781538122785.
