= Ne Kunda Nlaba =

Congolese film director

- Born: 1982 (age 43–44); Kinshasa
- Citizenship: Democratic Republic of the Congo
- Occupations: producer, director, screenwriter, actor, and political scientist.
- Notable work: Abeti Masikini: Le Combat d'Une Femme

Ne Kunda Nlaba (born 1982 in Kinshasa in Democratic Republic of the Congo) is a Congolese film producer, director, screenwriter, actor, and political scientist. He owns and is the CEO of his film production company, Labson Bizizi-cine Kongo Ltd., the film distribution company Afrika Bizizi Distribution Ltd., and the creator of Bizizi Box.

== Early life ==
Ne Kunda Nlaba began his artistic career as a child performing in plays and reciting poetry in primary and secondary school in Kinshasa in the Democratic Republic of the Congo. He won best actor trophies from school drama competitions. He began directing and giving drama training at age 16 to pupils from Baraka Primary School in Kinshasa, where he won prizes for Best Director and Best Performance for plays he had written, such as "Cri de Détresse et d’Espoir" and "L’Ivresse du Tresor".

He made his first film appearance as a lead actor in a short film “Un Virus a l'École” directed by Alain Ndontoni in 1998 in Kinshasa, Democratic Republic of the Congo.

Nlaba acted in several plays and performances including "Shella" (1998), "Pasteur Contre Evangéliste" (1999) with the Heaven Boyz Theatre Company, "Cri de Détresse et d’Espoir" (2005), and "Nsengane" ("Tale") (2007) with his own theatre company Virunga Theatre. He also participated in creating contemporary dance shows such as "Na Nini?" and "Bataille Sans Fin" with the Diba Dance Company of choreographer Jean-Marie Musungayi while working as their production manager.

Nlaba founded a theater company, "Virunga Theatre", and a Cultural Centre, "Labson Cultur'arts" in Kinshasa in 2004. He then created Festival Solo (also known as Mosi), a one-man performance festival with its first edition in 2005 and second edition in 2007 in Kinshasa.

In 2006, Nlaba began working with Canal 5 Television as a marketing/sales agent and presenter, and then joined Mbongi'Eto Cultural Centre with the griot Ne Nkamu Luyindula, and the project Kiamvu-Le Pont as well, as a communication officer, while still working as an actor.

In 2007, he founded a film production company Labson Bizizi-Cine Kongo, which began his film career in Kinshasa, and produced his first short horror film "The Next" in 2009 in London, a year after moving there. He produced his first documentary "The Steel Pan: The Spiritual Musical Instrument of the 20th Century" in 2010, which was screened at Montreal Black Film Festival in Montreal, Canada in 2011. He produced his first drama feature film "Cherie Bondowe" in 2012, while studying Film Production and Film Studies at University of West London, United Kingdom.

Nlaba co-directed "Abeti Masikini: Le Combat d'Une Femme" in 2015 with Laura Kutika. In 2015, he established a new film distribution company in London, Afrika Bizizi Distribution Ltd., dedicated to distributing "high quality and professional" African films made by African filmmakers, and also films about Africa produced by non-African filmmakers.

Nlaba intends to use his career experience to express his world view and to use his films to connect with the African public and with the public worldwide.

== Filmography ==
- "The Next" (2009)
- "The Steel Pan" (2010)
- "Living without Living" (2011)
- "Cherie Bondowe" (2012)
- "Abeti Masikini: Le Combat d'Une Femme" (2015)
- "Kimpa Vita: The Mother of African Revolution" (2016)
- "Kingdom of Kongo: In Search of The Destroyed Kingdom" (2020)
- "Afro Beat"
