= Kora Awards =

African music awards

KORA Awards
- Awarded for: Outstanding musical achievement in sub-Saharan Africa
- Country: Various
- First award: 1996
- Website: koraawards.com/en/

Television/radio coverage
- Network: Channel O

The KORA All Africa Music Awards are music awards given annually for musical achievement in sub-Saharan Africa. The awards were founded in 1994 by Benin born businessman, Ernest Adjovi, after a discussion in Namibia with the country's President Hage Geingob who was then a Prime Minister. The award is named after the kora, a West African plucked chordophone.

The awards have been subject to several postponements since 1994 with a variety of reasons given. Problems have arisen with contracts signed, large sums of monies have been paid and the event postponed.

In 2011 Adjovi was detained by the Nigerian Police Force with allegations he defrauded three Nigerian bodies. In 2008 Adjovi allegedly accepted [US]$2.5 million for the 2008 Awards to be hosted by the Cross River State Government. He later allegedly struck an agreement with the Lagos State Government for US$7.5 million but the awards were not staged until 2010 in Burkina Faso. At those awards brothers PSquare were named Artiste of the Year and were awarded a cash prize of $1 million but the prize was not forthcoming.

The 2015 awards were to be held 13 December in Namibia and a launch event was held in Namibia in May 2015. They were postponed to March 2016 and Adjovi was paid N$23,5 million. The awards did not take place and the whereabouts of Adovi is unknown. Namibia is trying to recover the money.

Since its inception, the KORA Awards has been staged eleven times on the African Continent. For the first ten years (1996-2005 - 9 Awards), the ceremony took place in South Africa. It has since moved to Burkina Faso (2010) and Ivory Coast (2012).

Winners have come from many different countries: Algeria, Angola, Benin, Botswana, Burkina Faso, Burundi, Cameroon, Cape Verde, Comores, Republic of the Congo, England, Ethiopia, France, Gabon, Ghana, Guinea, île de la Reunion, Ivory Coast, Kenya, Mali, Mauitius, Morocco, Nigeria, Democratic Republic of the Congo, Réunion, Rwanda, Senegal, Seyschelles, South Africa, Sweden, Tchad, Togo, Uganda, United States and Zimbabwe.

== Winners ==
Award	Winner	Award	Winner	Award	Winner	Award	Winner
1996
Best Male Artist of Africa	Youssou N'Dour (Senegal)	Best Male Artist of Africa	Papa Wemba (DRC)	Best Female Artist of Africa	Miriam Makeba (South Africa)	Most promising Male Artist of Africa	Lokua Kanza (DRC)
Most promising Female Artist of Africa	Brenda Fassie (South Africa)	Best Artist of North Africa	Cheb Mami (Algeria)	Best Artist of West Africa	Meiway (Ivory Coast)	Best Artist of Central Africa	Awilo Logomba (DRC)
Best Musician of Africa	Bheki Mseleku (South Africa)	Best Group of Africa	Bayete (South Africa)	Best Arrangement of Africa	Denzil Waela (South Africa)	LifeTime Achievement Award	Miriam Makeba (South Africa)
1997
Best Male Artist of Africa	Ismael Lo (Senegal)	Best Female Artist of Africa	Angélique Kidjo (Benin)	Most promising Male Artist of Africa	Cheikh Lô (Senegal)	Most promising Female Artist of Africa	Khadja Nin (Burundi)
Best Male Artist of North Africa	Cheb Khaled (Algeria)	Best Female Artist of West Africa	Cesária Évora (Cape Verde)	Best Artist of Central Africa	Awilo Logomba (DRC)	Best Male Artist of East Africa	Ziskakan (île de la Reunion)
Best Artist of Diaspora Europe / Caribbean	Edith Lefel (France)	Best Traditional Artist of Africa	Angélique Kidjo (Benin)	Best Traditional Group of Africa	Nigui Saff K-Dance (Ivory Coast)	Best Arrangement of Africa	Boncana Maïga (Mali)
1999
Best Male Artist of Africa	Femi Kuti (Nigeria)	Best Female Artist of Africa	Brenda Fassie (South Africa)	Most promising Male Artist of Africa	Axel Govinda (Ivory Coast)	Best Artist of North Africa	Takfarinas (Algeria)
Best Male Artist of West Africa	Femi Kuti (Nigeria)	Best Artist of Central Africa	Bozi Boziana (DRC)	Best Artist of East Africa	Khadja Nin (Burundi)	Best Artist from Southern Africa	Ringo (South Africa)
Best Artist of Diaspora USA	Lauryn Hill (United States)	Best Artist of Diaspora Europe / Caribbean	Natali Lorio (France)	Best Group of Africa	Bisso Na Bisso (Congo)	Best Traditional Group of Africa	Nigui Saff K-Dance (Ivory Coast)
Best Arrangement	Bisso Na Bisso (Congo)	Best Video	Bisso Na Bisso (Congo)	Lifetime Achievement Award Michael Jackson (USA)			
2000
Best Male Artist of Africa	Wes (Cameroon)	Best Female Artist of Africa	Zenzi (South Africa)	Most promising Male Artist of Africa	Kaysha (DRC)	Most promising Female Artist of Africa	Zenzi (South Africa)
Best Male Artist of West Africa	Kojo Antwi (Ghana)	Best Male Artist of Central Africa	André Marie Tala (Cameroon)	Best Male Artist of East Africa	Jean Marc Volcy (Seychelles)	Best Male Artist from Southern Africa	jabu khanyile (South Africa)
Best Artist of Diaspora USA	Sisqo (USA)	Best Group of Africa	Extra Musica (Congo)	Best Traditional Artist of Africa	King Mensah (Togo)	Best Arrangement of Africa	Valerie Kimani (Kenya)
LifeTime Achievement Award	Kofi Annan (Ghana)	Best Video of Africa	Wes (Cameroon)				
2001
Most promising Female Artist of Africa	Rokia Traoré (Mali)	Best Artist of North Africa	Rhany Kabbadj (Morocco)	Best Female Artist of Africa	Coumba Gawlo (Senegal)	Best Male Artis of Africa	Werrason (DRC)
Best Artist of Southern Africa	Mandoza (South Africa)	Best Artist of Diaspora USA	Bebe Winans (USA)	Best Group of Africa	Bongo Maffin (South Africa)	Best Female Artist of West Africa	Coumba Gawlo (Senegal)
Best Video of Africa	Sawt el Atlas (Morocco)	Jury Special Award	Brenda Fassie (South Africa)	Best Traditional Artist of Africa	Meiway (Ivory Coast)	Best Arrangement of Africa	Yvonne Chaka Chaka (South Africa)
Most promising Male Artist of Africa	Ernie Smith (Ivory Coast)	Most Promising Female Artist of Africa	Felia Mballo (Senegal)	Best Female Artist of East Africa	Sandra Mayotte (Mauritius)	Jury Special Award	Awilo Logomba (DRC)
2002
Most promising Female Artist of Africa	Annie-Flore Batchiellilys (Gabon)	Most promising Male Artist of Africa	Blak Twang (England)	Best Artist of East Africa	Eric Wainaina and Henrie Mutuku (Kenya)	Best Group of Africa	Makoma (DRC)
Best Arrangement of Africa	Meyway (Ivory Coast)	Best Male Artist of Central Africa	Koffi Olomidé (DRC)	Best Female Artist of West Africa	Suzanna Lubrano (Cape Verde)	Best Female Artist of Africa	Judith Sephuma (South Africa)
Best Traditional Artist of Africa	King Ayaovi Mensah (Togo)	Best Artist of Diaspora USA	Shaggy (USA)	Best Video of Africa	Koffi Olomidé (DRC)	Best Arrangement of Africa	Koffi Olomidé (DRC)
Jury Special Award	Koffi Olomidé (DRC)						
2003
Best Artist – West Africa – Male	Kojo Antwi (Ghana)	Best Artist – West Africa – Female	Suzanna (Cape Verde)	Best Artist – East Africa – Male	George Okudi (Uganda)	Best Artist – East Africa – Female	Chamsia Sagaf (Comores)
Best Artist – Central Africa – Male	Douleur (Cameroon)	Best Artist – Central Africa – Female	Mbilia Bel & Tshala Muana (R.D.Congo)	Best Artist – Southern Africa – Male	Oliver Mtukudzi ( Zimbabwe)	Best Artist – Southern Africa – Female	Busi Mhlongo(South Africa)
Best Artist Or Group Traditional	Machesa Traditional Group (Botswana)	Best African Group	Quartier Latin International (D.R. Congo) & nti-Palu (Ivory Coast)	Best African Video	Jeff Maluleke ( South Africa)	Best African Arrangement	Yvonne Chaka Chaka (South Africa)
Best African Gospel Female Artist	Rebecca (South Africa)	Best African Gospel Male Artist	Lundi (South Africa)	Best African Gospel Group	Notre Dame de la Salette (Gabon)	Most Promising African Female Artist	Barbara Kanam (D.R.Congo)
Most Promising African Male Artist	Jean-Paul Samputu (Rwanda)	Most Promising African Group	Macase (Cameroon)	Revelation Of The Year	Eben & Family (Gabon)	Most Promising Artist of the African American Diaspora	Ludacris (USA)
Best Female Artist of the African American Diaspora	Angie Stone (USA)	Best Male Artist of the African American Diaspora	R Kelly (USA)	Best Video of the African American Diaspora	R Kelly (USA)	Life Time Achievement Award	Oliver Mtukudzi (Zimbabwe)
Europe/ Caribbean Diaspora	Avalon (Mohombi & Djo Moupondo) (Sweden)	Special Judge Award	Soumbil (Ivory Coast) & Notre Dame de la salette (Gabon)				
2004
Best Traditional Artiste	King Mensah (Togo)	Best West African Female	Kamaldine (Guinea)	Best West African Male	Kunle (Nigeria)	Best African Group	JJC&419 Squad (Nigeria)
Best African Video	Reggie Rockstone (Ghana)	Best Gospel Group	Schekina (Ivory Coast)	Promising Male Artist	Madson Junior (Burkina Faso)	Best East African Female	Achieng Abura (Kenya)
Best East African Male	Big Pin (Kenya)	Best Gospel Male Artist	Kunle (Nigeria) DNG (Kenya)	Best East African Female	Tsedenia Gebremarkos (Ethiopia)	Best Central African Male	Félix Wazekwa (DRC) & Werrason (DRC)
Best Male African Artist	Werrason (DRC)	Promising Female Artist	Dinally (Cameroon)	Best S.A. Male Artist	Kabelo Mabalane (South Africa)	Best S.A. Female Artist	Thandiswa Mazwai (South Africa)
Best African Group	Malaika (South Africa)	Best Gospel Female	Deborah Fraser (South Africa)	Best Traditional Group	Mahube (South Africa)	Promising Female Artist	Swazi (South Africa)
Best African Video	Zola (South Africa)	Best Arrangement	Wanda Baloyi (South Africa)	Revelation of the Year	Malaika (South Africa)	Best African Female	Thandiswa Mazwai (South Africa)
2005
Best Male Artist of Africa	Hugh Masekela (South Africa)	Best Female Artist of Africa	Adja Soumano (Mali)	Most Promising Male Artist of Africa	2 Face Idibia (Nigeria)	Most Promising Female Artist of Africa	Kaz (Kenya)
Best Male Artist of West Africa	Martin Hod (Benin)	Best Male Artist of West Africa	Neji (Nigeria)	Best Female Artist of West Africa	Zeinab (Benin)	Best Female Artist of Central Africa	Naneth (Gabon)
Best Female Artist of East Africa	Neema (Kenya)	Best Male Artist of East Africa	Alain Auriant (Mauritius)	Best Video of Africa	Afrotenors (South Africa)	Best Group of West Africa and Africa	Ade Bantu (Nigeria)
Best Group of East Africa	Longombas (Kenya)	Best Female Artist of Southern Africa	Perola (Angola)	Best Group of West Africa	Praye (Ghana)	Best Arrangement of Africa	Toumani Diabate (Mali)
Best Artiste of Diaspora USA	Will Smith (USA)	Best Male Artist of Central Africa	Werrason (DRC)	Best Artist of Diaspora Europe / Caribbean	Kaysha (France)	Best Gospel Group of Africa	Maximum Melodies (Kenya)
Best Female Artist of West Africa	Adja Soumano (Mali)	LifeTime Achievement Award	Koffi Olomide (DRC)				
2010
Best Female Artist of Africa	Asa (Nigeria)	Best Traditional Artist of Africa	Bassekou Kouyate (Mali)	Best Ragga Group of Africa	Chronik 2H (Senegal)	Best Group of Diaspora Europe / Caribbean	Mc Malcriado (Cape Verde)
Best Reggae Artist of Africa	King Wadada (Nigeria)	Best Traditional Group of Africa	Ladysmith Black Mambazo (South Africa)	Best Arrangement of Africa	Toumani Diabate (Mali)	Best Male Artist of Africa	P Square (Nigeria)
Best Gospel Male Artist of Africa	Sammie-Okposo (Nigeria)	Best Hip Hop Artist of Africa	Smockey (Burkina Faso)	Best Reggae Artist of Africa	Sasha Marley (Ghana)	Most Promising Female Artist of Africa	Chidinma (Nigeria)
Best Gospel Female Artist of Africa	Noellie (Togo)	LifeTime Achievement Award	Pierre Akendegue (Gabon)	LifeTime Achievement Award	Cesária Évora (Cape Verde)	Best Gospel Group of Africa	Black Diamond (Senegal)
Best Group of Africa	P Square (Nigeria)	Best Video of Africa	P Square (Nigeria)	Best Female Artist of Diaspora Europe/Carrebean	Felia (Senegal)	Best HipHop Group	
2012
Best Artist of Africa	DJ Arafat (Ivory Coast)	Best Traditional Female Artist of Africa	Aida Samb (Senegal)	Best Artist of North Africa	Cheb Khaled (Algeria)	Best Female Artist of West Africa	Chidinma (Nigeria)
Most Promising Male Artist of Africa	Davido (Nigeria)	Best Female Artist of North Africa	Hasna El Necharia (Algeria)	Best Female Artist of East Africa	Juliana Kanyomozi (Uganda)	Best Male Artist of East Africa	Kidum (Burundi)
Best Male Artist of Central Africa	Lord Ekomy Ndong (Gabon)	Best Male Artist of West Africa	DJ Arafat (Ivory Coast)	Best Female Artist of Central Africa	Mounira Mitchala (Tchad)	Best Gospel Group of Africa	Seraphim Songs (Burundi)
Best Gospel Male Artist of Africa	Yvan(Benin)	Best Female Artist of Southern Africa	Zahara (South Africa)	Best Group of Africa	Magic Systeme (Ivory Coast)	Best Female Artist of Diaspora Europe/Caribbean	Sega El (Reunion)
Most Promising Female Artist of Africa	Sessime (Benin)	Best Traditional Male Artist of Africa	Stanlux (Togo)	Best Male/Group of Diaspora Europe/Caribbean	Sexion D'Assaut (France)	Best Male Artist of Diaspora USA	Chris Brown (USA)
Best Female Artist of Diaspora USA	Rihanna (USA)	Best Traditional Group of Africa	Les Freres Guedehoungue (Benin)	Best Director of Africa	Gelongal (Senegal)	Best Male Artist of Southern Africa	The Dogg (Namibia)
Best Gospel Female Artist of Africa	Soeur Lydie (DRC)						
