= King Wadada =

Nigerian musician and singer

- Born: Austin Peter; 1975 (age 50–51); Urhonigbe, Edo State, Nigeria
- Origin: Nigerian
- Genres: Reggae
- Occupations: Singer, musician
- Instrument: Vocalist guitarist congas
- Label: Miracle Day Music

Austin Peter, professionally known as King Wadada, (born on 6 August 1975) is a Nigerian reggae musician, singer, and songwriter. He won the Kora Awards in 2010 as Africa's best reggae artist of the year. He is best known for his song "Holy Holy."

== Early life ==
King Wadada was born on 6 August 1975 in Urhonigbe, in the Orhionmwon local government area of Edo State in Nigeria.

== Career ==
King Wadada was signed to Miracle Day Music. He won the Kora Awards as Africa's best reggae artist of the year in 2010.
