= Abeti Masikini: Le Combat d'Une Femme =

2015 film by Ne Kunda Nlaba

- Directed by: Ne Kunda Nlaba (in French)
- Screenplay by: Laura Kutika
- Produced by: Ne Kunda Nlaba Laura Kutika
- Narrated by: Fadila Belkacem
- Cinematography: Ne Kunda Nlaba
- Edited by: Laura Kutika
- Music by: Antonio Padiglia
- Production company: Un Sourire Nouveau Labson Bizizi-Cine Kongo Ltd.
- Release date: September 19, 2015 (Paris)
- Country: Democratic Republic of Congo

Abeti Masikini: Le Combat d'Une Femme (English: Abeti Masikini: The Struggle of A Woman) is a 2015 Congolese documentary film about the Congolese Diva and soukous star Abeti Masikini who fought for gender equality in the music industry during the 1970s. The film was directed by Ne Kunda Nlaba, who produced and wrote the film with Laura Kutika.

== Synopsis ==
Before 1970 in the Democratic Republic of the Congo, singing professionally was taken as a job for men; the industry was dominated by male singers.

Abeti Masikini (Elisabeth Finant), the daughter of the Congolese political figure Jean Pierre Finant assassinated with the first Prime minister, Patrice Emery Lumumba in 1961, stood up at age 16 and integrated the music industry. She gained success by bringing new melodies, style, and rhythm into the soukous genre despite rejections, deceptions, failures and hate for being a woman and for her voice.

She was the first African woman to perform at Bruno Coquatrix's Olympia in Paris in 1973, and then went to some big venues around the world such as Carnegie Hall, Royal Albert Hall, Wimbledon, Wembley Arena, and Le Zénith, among other venues.

Written by Laura Kutika, produced and directed by Laura Kutika and Ne Kunda Nlaba, Abeti Masikini: Le Combat d’une Femme shows the struggle of this woman singer, who had to cope with an artistic career and family life as a mother and later became an international icon, a voice and an example for other African young women in the industry. This documentary film raises the issue about female emancipation and takes us back to the 60s and 70s nostalgic music time.

The documentary film is a co-production between Un Sourire Nouveau and Labson Bizizi-Cine Kongo Ltd, and was premiered in Paris in France on 19 September 2015 and then screened at Festival du Film Africain de Belgique (FIFAB) in Brussels on 20 September 2015 and at Afrika Film Festival in March 2016 in Leuven.
