= Urhonigbe =

Town in Edo State, Nigeria

Urhonigbe, also known as Usonigbe, is a town about 60 miles away from Benin City in Edo State, Nigeria. Urhonigbe is located in Orhionmwon LGA, Edo State. Urhonigbe, is one of the culturally rich and ancient town dominated by warriors during the Benin empire.

== Clans ==
The town comprises three major quarters (Idun n' Okaro popularly known as Iduneka, Idun-Ehen and Idun Ogo which is headed by the senior quarters called Idun ugha). Added to these three major quatars of the town are two other villages, the Urhomehe and the Ovbiebo Camp. Urhonigbe is traditionally headed by Okavbo, who can be any confirm eldest citizen of the town.

== Festival ==
The Urhonigbe Festivals includes Izeki Festival which takes place at Urhonigbe in late February (1st 'moon' after the 12th moon) of every eighth year, The Igue Festival which takes place mild days of November month every year and The Ekaba Festival which is the most popular, it starts last two weeks of December and span across the year to end during the first week of the New year.

== Notable people ==
- King Wadada
