= King Mensah =

- King Mensah (2009)

Background information
- Origin: Lomé, Togo
- Genres: Afropop; Afrobeat
- Years active: 1996 – present
- Labels: Independent
- Website: King Mensah Official Website

King Mensah (born August 12, 1971), also known as "The Golden Voice of Togo", is a Togolese singer from West Africa. Though based in Lomé, he regularly records and promotes his albums in Paris, and has embarked on several world tours since 2005. Singing in Mina, Ewe, and French, King Mensah's sound fuses elements of traditional Ewe music (Agbadza and Akpessé), and Kabye dance-drum music, with funk, reggae and West African Afropop. King Mensah's lyrical themes are steeped in religion and hopeful encouragement for the orphaned, oppressed and downtrodden.

== History ==
King Mensah was born Ayaovi Papavi Mensah to a father from Togo and a mother from Benin. Mensah began performing with a 'ballet' of traditional Togolese folkloric music at age 9. In his formative years, he was a member of the band 'Les Dauphins de la Capitale'. He acted with Ki-Yi M’Bock Theatre in Abidjan, Côte d'Ivoire, in the early 1990s, then traveled to Europe, Japan, French Guiana, France and Benin as an actor and singer. In 2005, Mensah founded a philanthropic organization called "Foundation King Mensah" in Togo dedicated to the protection and education of orphans, including an orphanage in Agbodrafo, 25 km east of Lomé.

== Awards ==
- Togo Best artist ACCP with UNESCO of Paris in 1997
- Best Traditional African Artist
- Kora Award in South Africa in 2000
- Best Artist - Togo Music Awards in 2000
- Best Album ("Mensah, Mensah")- Togo Music Awards in 2000
- Price of excellence - Togo Music Awards in 2000
- Best Traditional African Artist - Kora 2004 in South Africa
- FIATI Trophy in Lomé in 2005
- Best African Social Artist in 2005
- Gold TAMANI in Mali in 2005
- Trophy of Independence in 2006 - Leader of the Togolese Music
- "Officer of the First Order" by the Togolese Head of State in 2008

== Discography ==
=== Albums ===
- Madjo (1996) ["I am Going"]
- Edidodo (1998) ["Courage"]
- Mensah Mensah (2000)
- Elom (2002) ["He/She Loves Me"]
- Yetonam (2008) ["He Answered My Call"]
- Da (2012) ["Mom"]
- Soke (2014) ["Forgive"]

== See also ==
- Music of Togo
- Afrofunk
