= Les Jumo =

French musical duo

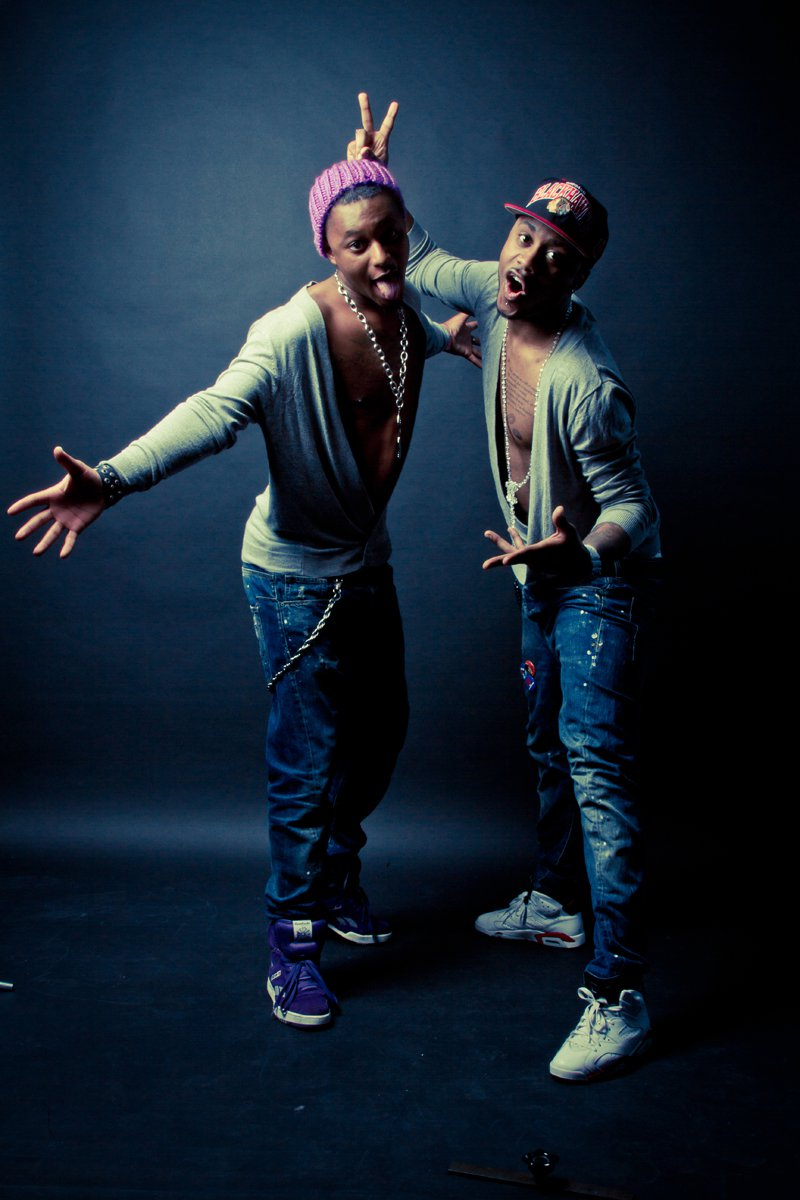
- Les Jumo (Linho de Gaucho on left, Docta Lova on right)

Background information
- Origin: France
- Genres: Pop, dance, zouk, coupé décalé, kuduro, hip hop, electro, reggaeton
- Years active: 2008 – present
- Members: Docta Lova "La Friandiz"; Linho de Gaucho "L'International"

Les Jumo (a phonetic way of writing Les Jumeaux in French, [le ʒymo], meaning The Twins) is a French singing and dancing duo with strong African influences formed in 2008 by the twin brothers known as Docta Lova La Friandiz and Linho de Gaucho L'International born 16 October 1985. They used the shortened Docta & Linho for some credits.

== With Selesao ==
In 2005, Jessy Matador created a music and dance group called La Sélésao, which was composed of Matador, Docta Love, Linho and Benkoff.

In late 2007, they signed with Oyas Records before signing with Wagram Records in spring 2008. They released their début single "Décalé Gwada" in June 2008, thus becoming one of the hits of that summer. On 24 November 2008, the group released the album Afrikan New Style, a musical hybrid of African and Caribbean influences with more urban sounds. The style is influenced by zouk, dancehall, reggae, hip hop, coupé-décalé, ndombolo and kuduro. In December 2008, they released their second single "Mini Kawoulé".

== As the duo Les Jumo ==
After forming the duo Les Jumo (a phonetic way of writing Les Jumeaux in French, meaning The Twins), they found fame on the dancefloor in the summer of 2009, mixing lively zouk (coupé-décalé) with dancehall, hip hop, reggaeton and electro influences as well as a beat rhythm influenced by Culture Beat. Also known as Les Jumo Selesao, their greatest success was the single "Zoomer", produced by Junior Caldera and promoted further by a dance music video. They have had collaborations with many dance acts including Jessy Matador, Willy William, Mohombi and others.

== Discography ==
=== Albums ===
Year	Title	Peak chart positions	Track listing
Year	Title	FR	Track listing
2012	Cartes sur table	–	1. "Zoomer" (3:31); 2. "Elle me donne chaud" (feat. Maradja) (3:20); 3. "C Show" (feat. Willy William & Vybrate) (3:00); 4. "Sexy" (feat. Mohombi) (3:07); 5. "On dit koi?" (feat. Linda William) (3:01); 6. "Boo G" (3:19); 7. "DéKoné" (3:33): (phonetically identical to [j'ai] déconné (I've messed up)).; 8. "Reine de Saba" (3:14); 9. "Tchouké Tchouké" (2:58); 10. "Tok Tok Tok" (3:00); 11. "Décalé 2.0" (3:33); 12. "36000 questions" (feat. Mello Mello) (3:14); 13. "Zoomer Remix" (feat. Admiral T) (3:39); 14. "Sexy" (Remix Sexy by DJ Kuba & Ne!tan) (5:35); 15. "Bouteille de Jack" (feat. Mello Mello) (3:55)

=== Singles ===
Year	Title	Peak chart positions	Album
Year	Title	FR	Album
2009	"Zoomer" (Les Jumo Sélésao)	5	Cartes sur table

Other songs and videos

Year	Title	Collaborating Artist(s)	Notes
2008	"Mama Sima"		
2008	"Zoomer" (credited as Les Jumo Sélésao)		
2010	"Boo G"		The title is phonetically identical to bouger (move)
2010	"C Show"	featuring Willy William and Vybrate	The title is a play on words: phonetically identical to C'est chaud (It's hot)
2010	"Tok Tok Tok"		
2011	"Sexy"	featuring Mohombi	
2012	"Elle me donne chaud"	featuring Maradja	
