= Authentik (Jessy Matador album) =

Studio album by Jessy Matador
- Released: 28 June 2013
- Recorded: 2012–2013
- Genre: World music, fusion music, zouk, dancehall, reggae, hip hop, coupé-décalé, ndombolo, zumba, kuduro
- Label: Wagram Music

Jessy Matador chronology
Elektro Soukouss (2010)	Authentik (2013)

Singles from Authentik
- 1. "Galera" Released: 1 August 2011; 2. "Zumba He Zumba Ha (Remix 2012)" Released: 2012

Authentik is an album by French singer Jessy Matador. Released on 28 June 2013 on Wagram Music, it is the third album of Matador following Afrikan New Style (2008) and Elektro Soukouss (2010).

== Track listing ==
No.	Title	Length
1.	"Morena" (feat. Romain)	2:59
2.	"Zumba He Zumba Ha (Remix 2012)" (DJ Mam's feat. Jessy Matador & Luis Guisao)	3:13
3.	"Dansa Pausa" (feat. Panetoz)	3:16
4.	"Galera" (feat. King Kuduro & Bra Zil)	2:57
5.	"Everybody's Free" (feat. Damon Blaze)	2:40
6.	"Ça va aller"	3:04
7.	"Danse danse" (feat. Zahouania by DJ Kim)	3:09
8.	"Mash Up" (by DJ Earworm)	3:10
9.	"Laissez passer" (feat. Sultan)	3:33
10.	"C Ma Night"	2:50
11.	"Lovin America"	3:04
12.	"Kentsuké" (feat. Baby C)	3:59
13.	"Oh la la j'adore" (feat. Baby C)	3:23
14.	"Ce soir on met le faya"	2:57

== Chart performance ==
Chart (2013)	Peak position
French Albums Chart	174
