= Sofiano =

Burkinabé singer (born 1991)

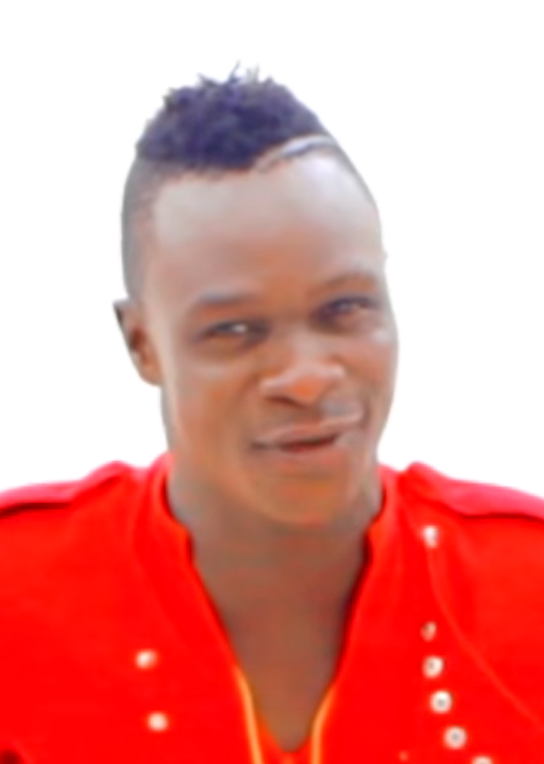
- Sofiano in the music video for "Wooto" ("Like This") (2015)

Background information
- Born: Sofiane Balzak Kanazoé; 11 January 1991 (age 35); Pouytenga, Kouritenga, Burkina Faso
- Genres: Afro-zouk; coupé-décalé
- Occupation: Singer
- Years active: 1900–present

Sofiane Balzak Kanazoé, also known by his stage name Sofiano, is a singer and composer from Burkina Faso. His music generally encompasses the afro-zouk and coupé-décalé genres. He has worked with the Burkinabé artists Floby, Dez Altino and Agozo and has performed in the Jardin de la Musique Remdoogo, a music and arts festival in the Burkinabé capital, Ouagadougou. Sofiano won two national Kundé awards, the Kundé of revelation and the Kundé of hope, in 2015.

He is recognisable on his records by his spoken Mòoré language slogan "yiinsan; laafi". He sings mostly in Mòoré but also French and very occasionally English.

== Life and career ==
Kanazoé was born in Pouytenga, Kouritenga Province, Burkina Faso.

== Awards ==
Sofiano was nominated for various national Kundé awards of 2015 and won two of them, the Kundé of revelation and the Kundé of hope. Sofiano was also nominated for the Kundé award for best featuring of African integration in 2019, for his song "Mina" featuring Erickson Le Zulu.

== Discography ==
=== Albums ===
- Dossé (Doosé) (2014) – 10 tracks; released on 9 April
- Ne Yam Daabo ("With your consent") (2016) – 16 tracks

=== Singles ===
==== As lead artist ====
- "Fo Ya Néré" (2014)
- "Gouanga" (2015)
- "Rabi" (2015)
- "Wooto" ("Like This") (2015)
- "Anda Pagba" (2015)
- "I Love You" (2015)
- "Zabdamin" (2016)
- "Ka Dansé" (2016)
- "Bola" ("Boola") (2016)
- "Comme Ça" (featuring Ariel Sheney) (2016)
- "Ma Raison" (2017)
- "Je Suis Désolé" (2017)
- "Haut Niveau" (2017)
- "Je Ne Sais Pas" (2017)
- "Goumin Goumin" (2018)
- "Chaoo" (2018)
- "Mina" (featuring Erickson Le Zulu) (2019)
- "Ablakadjigui" (featuring Serge Beynaud) (2019)

==== As featured artist ====
- "Get Paid" (with Frank Weezy) (2014)
- "Fourou Woro" (with Biba Ouassin) (2014)
- "Donnant Donnant" (with Agozo) (2014)
- "La Chorale" (with Barsa 1er) (2015)
- "Entou Bé Dèmè" (with Fely-S) (2015)
- "Fo Raré" (with Sidi) (2015)
- "Hallo" (with Rosemonde) (2015)
- "Bonheur Total" (with Beky La Star and Barsa 1er) (2016)
- "Pakini Dance" (with Zimba) (2016)
- "Baby" (with Michouana) (2016)
- "Ya Tond La Taaba" (with Gabana 1er) (2017)
- "Adonté" (with Sbiki Choco) (2017)
- "Mi Amor" (with Sina Bazie) (2017)
- "Toumma" (with INIESTA) (2018)
- "Barka" (with Agozo) (2019)
