= Abou Nidal =

Abou Nidal de Genève is the stage name of Aboubakar Doumbia born on December 29, 1974, in Divo (Ivory Coast), Ivorian composer, performer and producer. His pseudonym is linked to the fact that he lived for many years in Geneva, Switzerland. His nickname is also Wara Boss in reference to the Wara Tour.

== Career ==
In 2002, seven young Ivorian artists residing in France, led by Douk Saga, created La Jet7 (of Paris), a group at the origin of coupé-décalé. At that time, Abou Nidal, lives in Geneva (Switzerland) and is part of the first generation of creators of this musical movement. At the end of 2006 he released his first solo song in Abidjan (Ivory Coast), “La chaussure qui parle”.

Coupé-décalé singers are, above all, creators of concepts. That is why Abou Nidal's songs always carry a message. Thus, "La chaussure qui parle" (inspired by flamenco, Spanish dance), "C'est le moment" (glorifies the important moments of life), "Dialogue direct" (encourages exchange), "Le moussement final" (whatever you do, you return to dust), "Petit à petit" (you must adapt to the rhythm of life, do not want to skip steps because at the end of the effort is the reward).

In 2013 the Abou Nidal Foundation was established. In 2019, its name was changed to Lion Foundation to refer to the word "wara" which means Lion in Malinké.

In 2013, his track "Yaya cassez-tête" illustrates the concept: In life, better to think rather than choose the easy way.

In response to the terrorist attacks on March 13, 2016, in Bassam (Ivory Coast), Abou Nidal is one of the members of the group of Ivorian singers, the Collectif de Bassam. A song: "Même pas peur", was created to express, in music, the will to fight against jihadism, in favor of freedom of expression and Peace.

In 'April 2020, following the declaration of the COVID-19 pandemic by the World Health Organization (WHO), Abou Nidal created the song "Covid-19" to encourage people to respect social distancing, wearing masks, washing their hands and using hydroalcoholic gel. The artist performs the song with one of his protégés, the Ivorian singer Ismael Kolbashi. The text supports the health professionals and pays tribute to Manu Dibango, victim of the virus. During his tours in the interior of the country, the Ivorian singer distributes gel and masks to the vulnerable populations he meets.

In November 2020, Abou Nidal participated in the Collectif de Paix en Côte d'Ivoire brought together by Ivorian artist DJ Lewis to call for an end to the electoral unrest in Côte d'Ivoire. About fifteen Ivorian musicians, including stars such as Affou Keita, Didier Bilé, Jim Kamson, Molare, Ariel Sheney and Bebi Philip, launched a song titled "Nous on veut la paix" (We want peace). Abou Nidal considered that this was the moment to send a strong message to politicians: "Peace is not an empty word, it is a behavior".

2021 The album Confirmation is launched. It contains among others the title Abidjan, a song in which 3 times Award winner Toumani Diabaté plays the kora and Elown of the Kiff No Beat group sings.

== Humanitarian activities ==
Since 2012, the artist decided to get involved in humanitarian work and particularly in the fields of health, education and protection of the environment in Africa.

In 2013, Abou Nidal is the initiator and organizer of a concert in favor of the fight against AIDS. He brought together, in Abidjan, about twenty artists at the Palais de la Culture de Treichville (Ivory Coast). He supports patients infected with HIV (human immunodeficiency virus) by distributing food and health kits in Ivorian hospitals.

May 2018, Abou Nidal participates in the laying of the foundation stone of the school of the NGO L'Ecole des Enfants in Bouaké, for children from disadvantaged families of the city.

In April 2020, following the declaration of the COVID-19 pandemic by the World Health Organization (WHO), Abou Nidal created the song "Covid-19" to curse the virus and encourage people to respect social distancing, wearing of masks, washing of hands, and the use of hydro-alcoholic gel. The artist performs the song with one of his protégés, the Ivorian singer Ismael Kolbashi. The text supports the health professionals and pays tribute to Manu Dibango, victim of the virus. During his tours in the interior of the country, the Ivorian singer distributes gel and masks to vulnerable populations he meets.

In May 2021, he was vaccinated against COVID-19 in San Pedro, in public, to encourage Ivorians to do the same.

During the 2021 Wara Tour, Abou Nidal started to educate children on the protection of the environment.

== Wara Tour ==
The Wara Tour is an initiative of singer artist Abou Nidal, launched in 2017. Its slogan is: Educate - Encourage - Entertain. The anthem of the caravan, a song composed by Abou Nidal, is entitled: "Go to school!".

The Wara Tour 2020 was launched February 28 at the Abobo City Hall. The deputy of Tengrela, Traoré Mariam, representing the Prime Minister Amadou Gon Coulibaly and Kandia Camara, Minister of National Education, Technical Education and Vocational Training were present at the launching ceremony. The second caravan of 2020 ended on 24 October 2020 in Daloa.

In 2020 the laying of the foundation stone of the Abou Nidal Foundation school took place in Korhogo.

In 2021, the fifth edition of the Wara Tour, had for theme: "No to child labor in the cocoa-culture". The launching ceremony took place on 20 April, at the Sofitel hotel Ivoire, under the sponsorship and the effective presence of the first lady of Côte d'Ivoire, Dominique Ouattara. The caravan traveled through 20 cocoa towns to reward the best students with laptops, tablets, school kits, and many other prizes in kind. As part of the sensitization against child labor in cocoa farming, addressed to parents, teachers, and students, the caravan was accompanied in the field by experts and partners of the National Committee for Monitoring Actions against Trafficking, Exploitation and Child Labor (in French: Comité National de Surveillance des Actions de Lutte contre la Traite, l’Exploitation et le travail des Enfants /CNS) of Côte d'Ivoire.

The artist announces that a school, composed of six classrooms, will be offered to the children of the city of Korhogo by September 2022.Abou Nidal : "Il y a urgence à construire des écoles"

Abu Nidal encourages children to respect the environment. From now on, those who will not throw plastic bags in the nature will receive notebooks.

In 2021, the Wara Tour also worked with the Ivorian Ministry of Health, Public Hygiene, and Health Coverage. Indeed, the Ivorian authorities took advantage of the caravan to encourage vaccination against COVID-19 among local populations. Côte d'Ivoire was also congratulated by the Regional Director of the World Health Organization (WHO), Dr. Matshidiso Moeti, for its "good communication campaign for vaccination against COVID-19, which has resulted in good adherence of the population to vaccination.

The 2022 Wara Tour, has decided to raise awareness among parents, teachers and students about the 17 United Nations Sustainable Development Goals (SDGs).The theme of the sixth edition is: "No, to child labor and exploitation. Yes, to clean water in schools and to the protection of the environment." It is a way to recall the importance of advocacy in favor of quality education (SDG 4), access to clean water and sanitation (SDG 6) and it is also important to take action on climate change (SDG 13).

== Discography ==
- 2006 : La chaussure qui parle
- 2008 : Dialogue direct
- 2010 : Déclarez vos biens
- 2013 : Ça c'est quoi ça encore
- 2013 : Kpayaille
- 2014 : Yaya cassé tête
- 2015 : Biankouman
- 2016 : Waraba
- 2016 : Tu suis ou tu suis pas, Ici c'est pas là-bas, là-bas c'est pas ici
- 2019 : Moussement Final
- 2020 : Corona Feat Ismael Kolbashi
- 2020: "Nous, on veut la Paix" Collectif de Paix en Côte d'Ivoire
- 2020 : Mon coupé décalé
- 2021 : Abidjan Feat Toumani Diabaté & Elwo'n
- 2021 : Abidjan (Version Saxophone)
- 2021 : Bassam Tchin-tchin
