= Maradja =

French singer and producer

- Birth name: Korriche Toufik
- Born: Montauban, France
- Genres: Pop, dance
- Occupation(s): Singer, songwriter, record producer
- Years active: 2002–present
- Website: www.maradja.com

Korriche Toufik, better known by his stage name Maradja, is a French singer, songwriter and music producer. He has collaborated with a number of artists and is mostly known for his 2008 hits with DJ Assad, most notably "Everybody Clap" and "Summer Lovin'", both credited as DJ Assad vs Maradja. They were both French and pan-European club hits, further adapted by Greg Parys for hits in more countries including Italy, Portugal and Poland. He is also known for his first official solo single "Mi Amor".

Other collaborations include writing two hits for Jessy Matador, namely "Y'a qu'à demander" and "So Fine" in 2008, for Sandy Ground Factory in their hit "Move Ya Body" in 2009 and "Top of the World" appearing in DJ Nite Box as well as the hit "Come On Everybody" both in 2010 and the Les Juno hit "Elle me donne chaud" featuring Maradja. He has also worked with Willy William, Big Ali, Alex Milano, Xavier Decanter, Sandy Vee, Kylian Mash, Tom Snare and was featured in Kylian Mash's hit "Club Certified" which also featured Akon.

== Discography ==
Year	Single	Peak positions	Certification	Album
Year	Single	FR	Certification	Album
2008	"Everybody Clap" (DJ Assad vs Maradja)	25		
2008	"Summer Lovin'" (DJ Assad vs Maradja)	14		
2012	"Mi Amor"	–		

Featured in

- "Oh Oh" (DJ Assad vs Maradja) (2007) (second version featuring Maradja and Willy William)
- "Club Certified" (Kylian Mash feat. Akon and Maradja)
- "No Tomorrow" (Kylian Mash feat. Jay Sean and Maradja)
- "Elle me donne chaud" (2012) (Les Jumo feat. Maradja)

Appearances

- 2011: "Girl You So" in compilations Fun Dance 2011, Fun Anthology, NRJ Dance 2011 and H1ts 2011 – Tous les tubes de 2011
- 2011: "Party Tonight" in compilation Le son dancefloor 2011 – Vol. 2
