= Ryan Stevenson (drummer) =

Canadian drummer, musician, singer (born 1987)

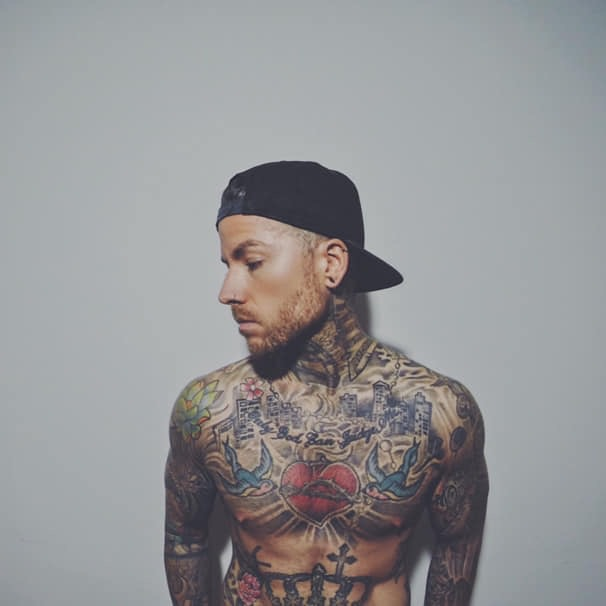
- Born: Ryan James Willis Stevenson; 14 June 1987 (age 39); Montreal, Quebec, Canada
- Other name: RJWS
- Musical career
- Genres: Rock; pop; hip hop; punk rock; rap rock; alternative rock
- Instruments: Drums; percussion
- Website: ryanstevensondrums.com

Ryan James Willis Stevenson (born 1987) is a Canadian musician from the province of Quebec. He released his debut album Better Late Than Never in February 2015 with "Never Let Me Go" as the single from the album. In addition to being a drummer, he is also a singer, songwriter, and guitar and keyboards player.

Stevenson is also known as RJWS (acronym of his birth name) started his career in rock music as a member of bands Red October and Kamakazi. Some of both bands' music clips aired on Canadian French and English TV and radio stations and two albums have been released. Afterward, Stevenson embarked on a solo career as a drummer with personal shows, at various special and public events and in collaborations with a great number of artists including P. Diddy, Snoop Dogg, Wyclef Jean, Drake, French Montana, Waka Flocka Flame, Ace Hood, T-Pain, Mohombi, K.Maro, Shy'm, Corneille, Massari, Mia Martina, Sean Paul, Hedley, Karl Wolf, Danny Fernandes, Booba, Soprano (of Psy4), DJ Battle with La Fouine, The Bilz and Kashif, L'Algérino, Ricky J, Imposs (and Muzion), Ale Dee, Marco Volcy, 4Say. He can be seen featured in Canadian artist's Souldia's music videos "Ce n'était pas voulu" and "Je n'ai pas mal. "

and others.

== In popular culture ==
The heavily tattooed Ryan Stevenson has been featured in several promotional posters and ads and a series of magazines as well as modelling. He was featured in Ridsa's debut hit single "Je n'ai pas eu le temps" which also featured Willy Williams.

He has performed in several drums remix videos notably that of DJ Assad's video "Addicted" featuring Mohombi, Craig David, and Greg Parys.

In 2014 Ryan was featured during the entrance ceremony of Haitian Canadian professional boxing champion Jean Pascal, on 6 December at the Bell Centre in Montreal. He was featured with Jean during his Entrance.Jean Pascal vs. Lucian Bute.

Ryan spent some time in China representing and touring and teaching while showcasing popular drum brands such as Tama Drums, and Sabian.

After his time in China in 2019, Ryan began working with A.J. McLean from the Backstreet Boys alongside Dj Lux, Franceso Yates, and others drumming for their Group ATCK also known as All The Cool Kids.

Recently, ATCK performed for the Victoria's Voice Foundation in Las Vegas with A.J. McLean, Chris Kirkpatrick (*Nsync), and Jeff Timmons of (98 Degrees). He has also performed with ATCK at the final Friday After 5 Music festival for the season in Owensboro Kentucky.

== Personal life ==
He is the son of Stephanie Willis. She died in 2014 at the age of 57. Stevenson's track "Dear Mom" is dedicated to her with family footage in his music video for the song.

== Discography ==
=== Albums ===
Title and details
Better Late Than Never
- Type: Album
- Released: February 19, 2015
Notes

No.	Title	Length
1.	"Day You Walked Away"	3:25
2.	"Never Let Me Go"	3:33
3.	"I'd Do"	3:15
4.	"It's Over"	3:47
5.	"Dear Mom"	4:13
6.	"Word That They Call Love"	4:05
7.	"Fire"	3:45
8.	"Interlude (Outro)"	1:30

=== Singles ===
Year	Single	Peak positions FRA	Album
2013	"Je n'ai pas eu le temps" (Ridsa feat. Willy William and Ryan Stevenson)	76	–
2014	"Bring Me Down" Co-Written By Matt Bueller	–	–
2014	"I'm A Champ" Tribute to Jean "Champ" Pascal Jean Pascal Featuring B.U. Sans Pression & Feezy	–	

Year	Single	Artist	Album
2013	"Hey Baby"	Ryan Stevenson Produced by Raphael Di Raddo Productions	
2015	"Never Let me Go"	Ryan Stevenson	Better Late Than Never
2016	"I Can't Win"	Anniska Written by Ryan Stevenson	
2016	"Coastal"	Ryan Stevenson	

Year	Single	Artist	Album
2016	"Moving Away	Ryan Stevenson	
2019	The Leap	Ryan Stevenson	
2020	"G-2"	Ryan Stevenson	

Year	Single	Artist	Album
2022	"Stay Inspired	Ryan Stevenson Ft Nick Gagnon	
2022	"Can We Go Back?"	Ryan Stevenson	

Live Performances
Year	Performance	Artist
2012	Mohombi Feat. Ryan Stevenson Finland	Mohombi,
