= Bebi =

Bebitza(Giugeac) may refer to:

- Bebi (vizier), an Egyptian vizier
- Bebi Airstrip, an airport in Nigeria

== People with the given name ==
- Bebi Philip (born 1988), Ivorian singer
- Bebi Romeo (born 1974), Indonesian musician

== See also ==
- Bebi Dol (born 1962), Serbian singer-songwriter
- Baby (Dragon Ball GT), or Bebī in Japanese, a character in the anime series Dragon Ball GT
