= Elektro Soukouss =

Studio album by Jessy Matador
- Released: 14 June 2010
- Recorded: 2009–2010
- Genre: Zouk, dancehall, reggae, hip hop, coupé-décalé, ndombolo, kuduro
- Label: Wagram Music

Jessy Matador chronology
Afrikan New Style (2008)	Elektro Soukouss (2010)	Authentik (2013)

Singles from Afrikan New Style
- 1. "Allez Ola Olé" Released: 10 May 2010; 2. "Dansez" Released: 24 January 2011

Elektro Soukouss is the second studio album by French singer Jessy Matador. It was released on 14 June 2010. It peaked at number 42 on the French Albums Chat.

== Singles ==
- "Allez Ola Olé" was the first single released from the album; it was released on 10 May 2010. Jessy Matador sang the song at the Eurovision Song Contest 2010 for France in the final Jessy scored 82 points and finished 12th, it reached number 1 on the French Singles Chart.
- "Dansez" was the second single released from the album; it was released on 24 January 2011; it reached number 86 on the French Singles Chart.

== Track listing ==
No.	Title	Length
1.	"Intro Money Jet"	1:44
2.	"Allez Ola Olé"	2:52
3.	"Bomba"	2:55
4.	"On dit quoi" (feat. Daïmonjo)	3:11
5.	"Elektro Soukouss"	3:35
6.	"Ca c'est bon"	3:20
7.	"Kariyimha"	3:41
8.	"Bla Bla Bla"	2:55
9.	"Dansez" (feat. Daddy Killa)	3:38
10.	"Sexy Lady"	3:16
11.	"V'la Les Fauves" (feat. Ayaman)	3:58
12.	"Caméra Filmée"	3:22
13.	"Sable Chaud"	3:17
14.	"Et Alors"	3:40
15.	"Encore Une Histoire" (feat. Laetitia Melody)	3:09
16.	"Tout Ce Que Je Veux"	3:29

== Chart performance ==
Chart (2010)	Peak position
French Albums Chart	42

== Release history ==
Region	Release date	Label
France	14 June 2010	Wagram Music
