= Authentik =

Authentik may refer to:

- Authentik (Jessy Matador album), 2013
- Authentik (Kenza Farah album), 2007
