= Dansa pausa =

2012 single by Panetoz

Single by Panetoz
- Released: February 17, 2012
- Recorded: 2012
- Genre: Pop
- Length: 2:59 (radio edit)
- Label: Warner Music Sweden
- Songwriters: Sergio Elgueta, Pa Moudou Badjie, Nebeyu Baheru, Johan Hirvi

Panetoz singles chronology
"Mer än ord" (2010)	"Dansa pausa" (2012)	"Vissla med mig" (2013)

Music video
- "Dansa Pausa" on YouTube

"Dance Pause"

Single by Panetoz
- Released: 2012
- Recorded: 2012
- Genre: Pop
- Length: 2:57 (radio edit)
- Label: Warner Music Sweden
- Songwriters: Sergio Elgueta, Pa Moudou Badjie, Nebeyu Baheru, Johan Hirvi

Music video
- "Dance Pause" on YouTube

"Dansa pausa" is single by Swedish multi-ethnic group Panetoz, and the musicproducer Memo Crescendo. It was released on Warner Music Sweden in February 2012, reaching the top of Sverigetopplistan, the official Swedish Singles Chart on week 19/2012 dated 11 May 2012. The single was certified gold on 8 May 2012. An English-language version "Dance Pause" was also released.

"Dansa pausa" follows three Panetoz singles that did not make it to the official charts, namely "Mama Africa", and together with musicproducer Memo Crescendo "Känn dig fri" and "Mer än ord".

== Track list ==
1. "Dansa pausa" (2:59)
2. "Dansa pausa" (radio house-remix) (4:22)
3. "Dansa pausa" (extended house-remix) (6:28)

A double A side bilingual single was released with the English-language version included. The release was a hit in Belgium:

1. "Dance Pause" (English version) (2:57)
2. "Dansa pausa" (Swedish version) (2:58)

== Charts ==
Dansa Pausa

Chart (2012)	Peak position	Certification
Sweden (Sverigetopplistan)	1	Gold

Year-end charts

Chart (2012)	Position
Sweden (Sverigetopplistan)	4

Dance Pause

Chart (2012)	Peak position	Certification
Belgium (Ultratip Bubbling Under Flanders)	3	Gold

(Appearing in Belgian Ultratip chart at number 3, effectively 53 in the general chart)

== Cover versions ==
Jessy Matador, the Democratic Republic of the Congo singer, currently residing in France has recorded a cover of the song with added French lyrics. The track credited to "Jessy Matador featuring Panetoz" appears as track number three on Matador's third album Authentik on Wagram Music released on 28 June 2013.
