= Boucantier =

In the Ivory Coast, a Boucantier is an artist or dancer who performs in the musical genre of Coupé-Décalé. It can also define a person who enjoys dressing in the fashion of a Coupé-Décalé artist, usually wearing similar styled clothes and jewellery.
