= Ridsa =

French singer

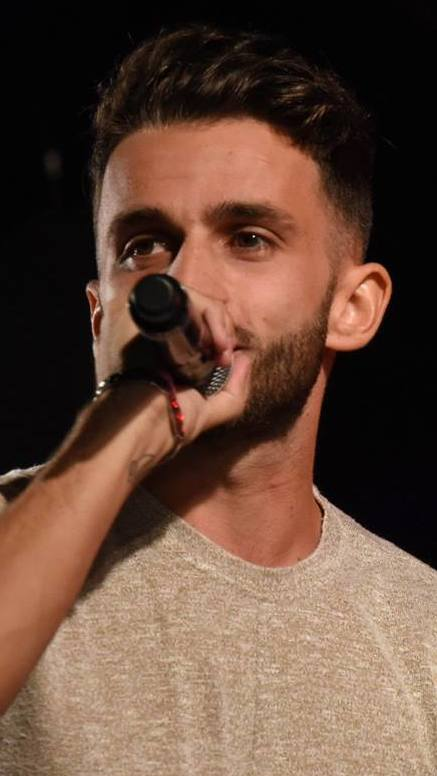

Background information
- Born: Maxence Boitez; 16 October 1990 (age 35); Orléans, Centre, France
- Genres: Pop; R&B; hip hop; pop-rap
- Occupations: Singer; rapper
- Instrument: Vocals
- Years active: 2010–present
- Labels: Juston Records; Musicast; Wagram Music

Maxence Boitez (French pronunciation: [maksɑ̃s bwatɛz]; born 16 October 1990 in Orléans), better known by his artistic name Ridsa (stylized as RIDSA), is a French singer and rapper of Spanish descent.

== Biography ==
After practicing soccer in his youth, he started rapping in 2010 putting his materials online gaining popularity. Recordings included collaborations with Flavie in "Toi et seulement toi", with Demhys in "J'aime quand" and with Latino, Cween, Angèle, Nabila etc. On 28 December 2012 he released "Amour Secret" with an accompanying music video. But it was his collaboration with Willy William and Canadian drummer Ryan Stevenson that gave him his first commercial success with the charting "Je n'ai pas eu le temps" and an EP Es tu fiesta containing "Es tu fiesta" and more mixes of "Je n'ai pas eu le temps".

Ridsa released his first album Mes histoires on 2 June 2014 with collaborations with Wanz, Dieselle, Pépé Rosso and Angèle. The album peaked at number 44 on the official French SNEP Albums Chart. The follow-up album L.O.V.E, released on 9 March 2015, made it to number 16. It featured collaborations with Marvin, Dieselle, Souf and DJ Kayz. He had further chart success with collaborations notably with Souf on the single "Baby" and with Kenza Farah on "Liées". His third album Tranquille was released on 11 December 2015. The track "Là c'est die" from the album became his biggest commercial success, reaching number 5 on the official French SNEP singles chart. A second track from the album, "Pardon", also charted. On 5 March 2017, Ridsa officially announced his fourth album, Libre, on Twitter.

== Discography ==
=== Albums ===
Year	Album	Peak positions			Notes	Certification
Year	Album	FR	BEL (Wa)	SWI	Notes	Certification
2014	Mes histoires: Date released: 2 June 2014; Record label: Juston Records (JST) / MUSICAST	44	176	–	No. / Title / Length; 1. / "Oh mama" / 3:21; 2. / "Solo" / 3:40; 3. / "Family (feat. Wanz)" / 3:32; 4. / "A la tienne" / 3:54; 5. / "Quoi qu'on en dise" / 4:17; 6. / "Elle a mal" / 3:38; 7. / "On s'évade" / 3:15; 8. / "Ne m'oublie pas" / 3:52; 9. / "Fais le vide (feat. Dieselle)" / 3:24; 10. / "Mes histoires" / 3:36; 11. / "Je cours" / 3:34; 12. / "Amour sans fin" / 3:34; 13. / "Laisse-moi parler" / 7:03; 14. / "Adios (feat. Pépé Rosso & Angèle)" / 3:26; 15. / "Nous et seulement nous" (feat. Angele)" / 3:44	
2015	L.O.V.E: Date released: 9 March 2015; Record label: Juston Records (JST) / MUSICAST	16	78	–	No. / Title / Length; 1. / "On s'est perdu" / 3:37; 2. / "Tout oublier" / 2:51; 3. / "Cogite" / 3:16; 4. / "Cette nuit" / 2:58; 5. / "Qu'une envie" (feat. Marvin)" / 3:06; 6. / "Je me souviens" / 3:09; 7. / "On s'aimera" (feat. Dieselle)" / 3:46; 8. / "Pour toi" / 3:40; 9. / "Baby (feat. Souf)" / 3:12; 10. / "Follow" / 3:12; 11. / "Je t'emmenerai" / 3:43; 12. / "Avec elle" / 3:12; 13. / "T'es dans le love" (feat. Marvin)" / 3:33; 14. / "Un petit ange" / 3:26; 15. / "Bailando, Contigo" / 3:46; 16. / "Progresse (feat. Marvin)" / 4:45; 17. / "Il te rend folle" / 3:42; 18. / "100 mecs sans meuf (feat. DJ Kayz & Li'lya Ds)" / 3:37; 19. / "Ecoute moi" / 3:30; 20. / "Tout oublier (Version acoustique)" / 2:13	
2015	Tranquille: Date released: 11 December 2015; Record label: Juston Records (JST) / Wagram	21	86	–	No. / Title / Length; 1. / "Dois-je m'en aller?" / 3:26; 2. / "C'est pas méchant" / 2:49; 3. / "Ti amo" / 2:54; 4. / "Fini" / 2:56; 5. / "La nuit" / 2:55; 6. / "Ils ne font que parler" / 3:04; 7. / "Je n'ai pas sommeil" / 3:07; 8. / "Là c'est die" / 3:15; 9. / "Tu connais la suite" / 2:53; 10. / "Elle me love" / 3:32; 11. / "Élégant" / 3:17; 12. / "Selfie (feat. H Magnum)" / 2:56; 13. / "Pardon" / 3:08; 14. / "Dans la ville (feat. Pepe Rosso)" / 3:49; 15. / "Tranquille" / 3:00; 16. / "On fait comment" / 3:48; 17. / "En Lové (feat. Stony)" / 3:21; 18. / "Laissez-moi" / 3:07; 19. / "Donne" / 3:40; 20. / "Seul" / 2:56; 21. / "Sa femme (feat. Roldan de Orishas)" / 2:53; 22. / "Génération" / 3:20; 23. / "Rien à prouver" / 3:06; 24. / "Tu te fais des scènes" / 3:07; 25. / "Je me rappelle" / 3:07; 26. / "Deux inconnus" / 3:07	FR: Platinum
2017	Libre: Release date: 14 April 2017	6	42	85	No. / Title / Length; 1. / "Oubliez-moi" / 3:23; 2. / "Avancer" / 3:37; 3. / "Leïla" / 3:23; 4. / "Si tu savais" / 3:15; 5. / "Pourquoi" / 3:27; 6. / "Mamamia" / 3:48; 7. / "Je chill" / 3:29; 8. / "Ça va aller" / 3:19; 9. / "Dernier verre" / 3:18; 10. / "Libre" / 3:28; 11. / "Les gens" / 3:01; 12. / "Fais ta maligne" / 3:26; 13. / "À la vie à la mort" / 3:11; 14. / "Encore" / 3:03; 15. / "Loco" / 3:14; 16. / "Porto Rico" / 3:33	FR: Gold
2019	Vagabond: Release date: 12 April 2019	20	–	–	No. / Title / Length; 1. / "Plume" / 3:49; 2. / "Ciao" / 3:40; 3. / "Joga Bonito" / 2:59; 4. / "Je les ferais danser" / 3:12; 5. / "Ragazza" / 2:57; 6. / "Je vais bien" / 3:06; 7. / "Tu m'aimes à mort" / 2:56; 8. / "Trop dit" / 3:03; 9. / "J'vais te" / 2:41; 10. / "Laisser couler" / 2:51; 11. / "Charbonné" / 2:41; 12. / "Vagabond" / 3:24; 13. / "Andale" / 2:56; 14. / "Douleur" / 3:06; 15. / "Magicienne" / 2:52; 16. / "Mambo" / 2:59; 17. / "C'est carré" / 2:49; 18. / "On s'est manqué (feat.Eva Guess)" / 3:15	–

=== EPs ===
Year
Album
Peak positions
Notes
FR

2013
Es tu fiesta (EP)
- Date released: 3 June 2013
- Record label: Willy William Music
–

No.	Title	Length
1.	"Es tu fiesta (Radio Edit) (feat. Willy William)"	3:09
2.	"Es tu fiesta (Club Edit) (feat. Willy William)"	4:36
3.	"Je n'ai pas eu le temps (Reggaeton Radio Remix) (feat. Willy William)"	3:20
4.	"Je n'ai pas eu le temps (Extended Reggaeton Remix) (feat. Willy William)"	4:52
5.	"Je n'ai pas eu le temps (Original Pop Rock Version) (feat. Willy William)"	3:35

=== Singles ===
Year	Single	Peak positions		Album
Year	Single	FR	BEL (Wa)	Album
2011	"Toi et seulement toi" (featuring Flavie)	–	–	
2012	"Amour Secret"	–	–	
2013	"Je n'ai pas eu le temps" (featuring Willy William & Ryan Stevenson)	76	–	
2013	"Es tu fiesta" (featuring Willy William)	–	–	Es tu fiesta (EP)
2013	"On part tonight"	–	–	
2014	"Nous et seulement nous" (feat. Angèle)	113	–	Mes histoires
2014	"Oh mama"	183	–	Mes histoires
2014	"Baby" (featuring Souf)	103	–	L.O.V.E
2014	"On s'est perdu"	52	–	L.O.V.E
2015	"Liées" (featuring Kenza Farah)	81	–	—N/a
2015	"Là c'est die"	5	28	Tranquille
2015	"Pardon"	15	39	Tranquille
2015	"Selfie" (featuring H Magnum)	137	–	Tranquille
2016	"Je m'en fous"	25	–	Libre
2016	"Porto Rico"	55	–	Libre
2017	"Avancer"	93	–	Libre
2017	"Mamamia"	79	–	Libre
2017	"Leïla"	190	–	Libre
2017	"J'aime bien"	172	–	
2018	"Désabonné"	36	–	
2018	"On s'en ira" (feat. DJ Samo)	62	–	
2019	"On s'est manqué" (feat. Eva Guess)	127	–	Vagabond
2019	"Laisser couler"	–	–	Vagabond
2023	"Nous Deux"	61	–	

*Did not appear in the official Belgian Ultratop 50 charts, but rather in the bubbling under Ultratip charts.

Appearances / Featured in

Year	Single	Peak positions		Album
Year	Single	FR	BEL (Wa)	Album
2014	"Olé olé" (Remix) (Lartiste, Zifou & Ridsa)	–	–	
2014	"100 mecs sans meuf" (DJ Kayz presents Ridsa & Li'lya DS)	–	–	
2015	"Validé" (DJ Kayz feat. Ridsa & Axel Tony)	12	40* (Ultratip)	
2015	"On s'met bien" (DJ Kayz feat. Ridsa)	143	–	

*Did not appear in the official Belgian Ultratop 50 charts, but rather in the bubbling under Ultratip charts.

=== Other songs ===
Year	Single	Peak positions	Album
Year	Single	FR	Album
2014	"Amour sans fin"	169	Mes histoires
2015	"Un petit ange"	84	L.O.V.E
2015	"Je me souviens"	175	L.O.V.E
2015	"Tout oublier"	193	L.O.V.E
2015	"Elle me love"	187	Tranquille
2016	"Dois-je m'en aller?"	–	Tranquille
2022	"Santa Maria"	18	
