= Agozo =

Burkinabé singer

- Birth name: Firmin Boubié Bazié
- Born: 5 March; Réo, Sanguié, Burkina Faso
- Genres: Coupé-décalé; zouglou
- Occupation: Singer
- Years active: 1995–present

Firmin Boubié Bazié, better known by his stage name Agozo, is a Burkinabé singer.

== Life and career ==
Bazié was born in Réo, in Sanguié Province, Burkina Faso. He is an ethnic Gurunsi.

According to Bazié, he originally received the name Agozo from his grandmother in the form of the Gurunsi (Lyélé) word "gbôzor", meaning "flat tô". Tô is a millet or sorghum porridge and a Burkinabé dish. When Bazié was a child, he didn't like heated tô, only flat tô. His college friends felt that it didn't sound good, so they added an "a" and removed the "b" to give Agozo.

Agozo first entered music in 1995 as part of the zouglou group Les Wôyô.

In August 2016, a music event and contest ranking the size of women's bodies, which Agozo featured in and promoted, was reported on by Western news networks such as France24, The Guardian and Reuters due to controversy surrounding it. The event was banned by the Burkina Faso Ministry of Women, National Solidarity and Family.

== Discography ==
=== Albums ===
- La Go (2015) – draws on Gurunsi binon musical tradition and coupé-décalé from Côte d'Ivoire.
