= Oxxy Norgy =

Ivorian singer

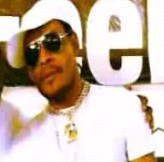

Background information
- Genres: World music, Coupé décalé

Oxxy Norgy is an Ivorian singer known for his Coupé Décalé style of music.

Oxxy Norgy first became known for his numerous features, including those with Boombastic Dj and 4x4 académia. He released his first album, which shared the same name of his initial concept "Moto bengué" and was inspired by "danse de la moto", a derivative of the coupé décalé style. Later, he created a new concept called "Maxhéro" which paid homage to the famous arranger of the same name.

Later, Norgy left Maxhéro and began producing with Afrikareprezenta (the rapper Rudy Rudiction's studio, and released a new concept called "prends côcôta, mets dans le sac", arranged by Deni di Lactif. In 2007, Norgy took part in the album of Dj Sisco, who created the concept of "Debout debout".

In April 2008, Norgy reemerged with a new discographic work that promoted a new concept called "corrigé corrigé" (corrected answer key). This last single was produced by 18 avril Production and the principal piece was arranged by N'Guessan Amessan, according to Bébi Philippe.
