= Everybody Clap =

Single by DJ Assad vs Maradja
- Released: 2008
- Recorded: 2007
- Genre: Merengue House
- Label: Scorpio Music

DJ Assad vs Maradja singles chronology
"Everybody Clap" (2008)	"Summer Lovin'" (2008)

Music video
- DJ Assad vs Maradja - "Everybody Clap" on YouTube

"Everybody Clap" is a 2008 bilingual French/English dance hit for DJ Assad vs Maradja and their first major hit in France. Released on Scorpio Music, it became very popular in European night venues and reached #25 in SNEP, the official French Singles Chart and staying a total of 16 weeks in the French charts.

For further propagation of the song, the collaboration of Greg Parys was sought with a new version credited to DJ Assad vs Maradja featuring Greg Parys. This version became a hit in Italy, Portugal and Poland.

== Music video ==
A music video was shot displaying Nancy, a smashing blonde getting a message that someone wants to court her. Throughout the video she encounters more solicitations from the persistent admirer to discover at the end to her utter shock that he is after all a rich old man...

== Charts ==
Chart (2008)	Peak position
SNEP French Singles Chart	25
