= Dansez =

Single by Jessy Matador featuring Daddy Killa

from the album Electro Soukouss
- Released: 24 January 2011
- Genre: Dance music
- Length: 3:38
- Label: Wagram Records
- Songwriters: Teetoff, Jessy Kimbangi
- Producer: Wewok Team

Jessy Matador singles chronology
| "Allez Ola Olé" (2010) | "Dansez" (2011) | "Galera" (2011) |

Music video
- "Dansez" on YouTube

"Dansez" is a single by French singer Jessy Matador, from his second album Electro Soukouss. The song features vocals from Daddy Killa. It was released on 24 January 2011 in France and peaked at number 86 in the French Singles Chart. As of May, 2011, it has had over 300,000 hits on YouTube.

== Track listing ==
Digital download

1. "Dansez" (Radio edit) – 3:38

== Credits and personnel ==
- Lead vocals – Jessy Matador and Daddy Killa
- Producers – Wewok Team
- Lyrics – Teetoff, Jessy Kimbangi
- Label: Wagram Records

== Chart performance ==
| Chart (2011) | Peak position |
|---|---|
| France (SNEP) | 86 |

== Release history ==
| Region | Date | Format | Label |
|---|---|---|---|
| France | 24 January 2011 | Digital download | Wagram Music |
