= Décalé Gwada =

Single by Jessy Matador

from the album Afrikan New Style
- Released: 23 June 2008
- Genre: Dancehall, Zouk, Ndombolo
- Label: Wagram Music

Jessy Matador singles chronology
"Décalé Gwada" (2008)	"Mini Kawoulé" (2009)

Music video
- "Décalé Gwada" on YouTube

"Décalé Gwada" is the first single by French singer Jessy Matador, from his debut album Afrikan New Style. The single cover credits the single to Jessy Matador a.k.a. La Selesao in reference to the collective that besides Matador included, Docta Love, Linho (later on members of Les Jumo and Benkoff. In great difference, the follow-up single "Mini Kawoulé" credited just Jessy Matador.

The single "Décalé Gwada" was released on 30 June 2008 in France and peaked at number 14 in the French Singles Chart. It was also a hit in Belgium reaching #23 in Ultratip Wallonia chart. The song was one of the hits of that summer. As of May 2011 it has had over 25 million hits on YouTube.

== Track listing ==
Digital download

1. "Décalé Gwada" – 2:55
2. "Décalé Gwada" (Extended) - 4:21

== Chart performance ==
Chart (2008)	Peak position
Belgium (Ultratip Wallonia)	23
European Hot 100 Singles (Billboard)	45
France (SNEP)	14

== Release history ==
Region	Date	Format	Label
France	1 June 2008	Digital download	Wagram Music
France	30 June 2008	CD single	Wagram Music
