= Là c'est die =

Single by Ridsa

from the album Tranquille
- Released: 23 September 2015
- Genre: R&B
- Length: 3:15
- Songwriters: Maxence Boitez; Rémy David

"Là c'est die" is a song by Ridsa from the album Tranquille.

== Charts ==
Chart (2015)	Peak position
Belgium (Ultratop 50 Wallonia)	28
France (SNEP)	5
