= Allez Ola Olé =

2010 song by Jessy Matador

Single by Jessy Matador

from the album Electro Soukouss
- Released: 10 May 2010
- Recorded: 2010
- Genre: Pop, dancehall, zouk, ndombolo
- Length: 2:52
- Label: Wagram Music
- Songwriters: Hugues Ducamin, Jacques Ballue

Jessy Matador singles chronology
"Mini Kawoulé" (2009)	"Allez Ola Olé" (2010)	"Dansez" (2011)

Music video
- "Allez, Ola, Olé" on YouTube

Eurovision Song Contest 2010 entry
- Country: France
- Artist: Jessy Matador
- Language: French
- Composers: Hugues Ducamin, Jacques Ballue
- Lyricists: Hugues Ducamin, Jacques Ballue

Finals performance
- Final result: 12th
- Final points: 82

Entry chronology
- ◄ "Et s'il fallait le faire" (2009)
- "Sognu" (2011) ►

"Allez Ola Olé" (French pronunciation: [ale ola ole], Come on! Ola! Olé!) is a song in the French language performed by French singer Jessy Matador that represented France at the Eurovision Song Contest 2010. The song was chosen internally, and was announced 24 February 2010. The song was to be used by French broadcaster France Télévisions as The Summerhit of 2010 and also for promoting the 2010 FIFA World Cup, and the title of the song refers to the album Music of the World Cup: Allez! Ola! Ole!, released in 1998 to coincide with the '98 World Cup, held in France.

Matador was selected internally by France Télévisions to represent France at the contest, and announced as the selected artist on 19 February 2010, after rumours of Christophe Willem, David Guetta and Emmanuel Moire being selected for the role. On 24 February Matador's song was announced, and was released online on 10 May. As of June 2020, it has over 61 million views on YouTube, making it one of the most-viewed videos on the official Eurovision channel.

== Track listings ==
- Digital download
1. "Radio Edit" – 2:52
2. "Radio Edit Electro" – 3:14
- German CD single
1. "Radio Edit" – 2:52
2. "Radio Edit Electro" – 3:14
3. "Video Clip" – 3:24
- French Promo CD single
1. "Kework & Cocozza Remix" – 4:24
2. "Afro Mix" – 4:01
3. "Techno Mix" – 3:47
4. "Radio Edit" – 2:52
5. "Radio Edit Electro" – 3:14

== Chart performance ==
Chart (2010)	Peak position
Austria (Ö3 Austria Top 40)	65
Belgium (Ultratop Flanders)	4
Belgium (Ultratop Wallonia)	13
Denmark (Tracklisten)	30
Europe (European Hot 100 Singles)	6
Finland (Suomen virallinen lista)	7
France (SNEP)	1
France Download (SNEP)	23
Germany (Media Control Charts)	17
Ireland (IRMA)	39
Norway (VG-lista)	5
Sweden (Sverigetopplistan)	34
Switzerland (Media Control Charts)	59
UK Charts (OCC)	81
US Hot Dance Club Songs (Billboard)	88

=== Year-end charts ===
Chart (2010)	Position
European Hot 100 Singles	36

== Release history ==
Region	Date	Format	Label
France	May 10, 2010	Digital download	Wagram Music
France	May 25, 2010	CD single	Wagram Music
Germany	June 11, 2010	CD single	Wagram Music
Worldwide	May 10, 2010	Digital download	Wagram Music
