= Souf (singer) =

French singer

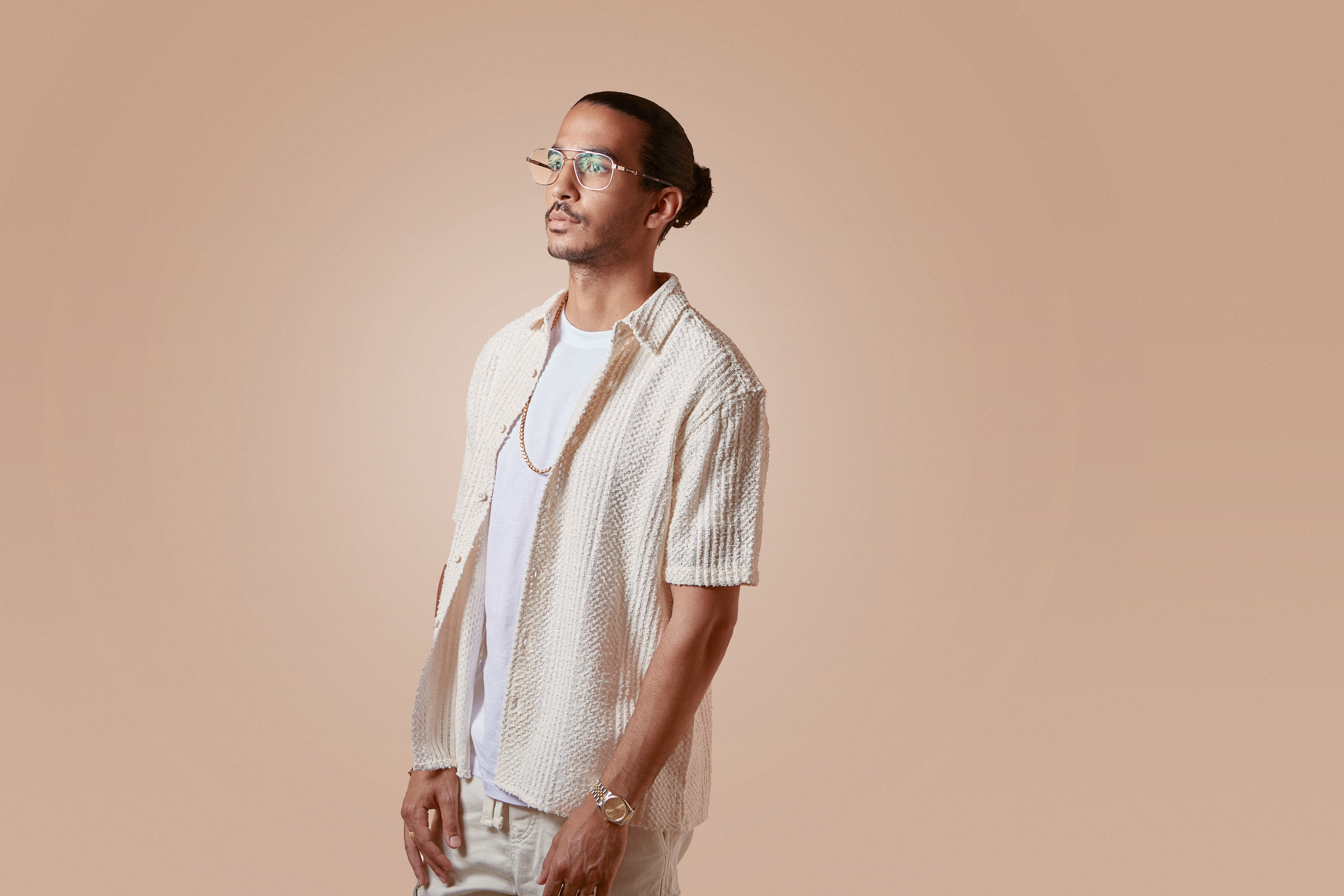
- Souf

Background information
- Born: Soufiène Nouhi; Nancy, France
- Origin: French of Moroccan and Algerian origin
- Genres: Urban pop; French rap; Latin pop; R&B
- Years active: 2010-present
- Labels: Polydor, Universal

Soufiène Nouhi (French pronunciation: [sufjɛn nui], [nwi]; Arabic: سفيان نوحي, sufyān nūḥī), better known as Souf, is a French singer of Algerian and Moroccan origins. He gained fame through his online releases, mostly covers of well-known songs. He also played the guitar, piano, violin and percussion. His first chart success was in 2014 when he was featured in Ridsa single "My Baby". He was eventually signed by Maître Gims to the label Monstre Marin Corporation, where Souf released his debut album Alchimie in 2016. "Mi amor" was pre-released as the debut single from the album reaching #23 on SNEP, the French Singles Chart. The follow-up single is "Mea Culpa". Both charted on SNEP, the official French Singles Chart.

== Discography ==
=== Albums ===
Year	Album	Peak positions	
Year	Album	FRA	BEL (Wa)
2016	Alchimie	16	47

Other album releases

- 2020: ADN

=== Singles ===
Year	Song	Peak positions		Album
Year	Song	FRA	BEL (Wa)	Album
2016	"Mi Amor"	23	43	Alchimie
2016	"Mea culpa"	96	–	Alchimie
2019	"Ça c'est fait"	114	–	ADN
2022	"Tout Doux"			ADN

=== Other songs ===
Year	Song	Peak positions	Album
Year	Song	FRA	Album
2018	"Wili Wili" (with Hassan)	–	TBA
2019	"Bye Bye" (with Hassan)	–	TBA

=== Featured in ===
Year	Song	Peak positions	Album
Year	Song	FRA	Album
2014	"Baby" (Ridsa feat. Souf)	103	Ridsa album L.O.V.E
2015	"Beauté marocaine" (DJ Kayz feat. Souf)	–	DJ Kayz album Paris Oran New York 2015
2015	"Mariage dérangé" (DJ Kayz feat. Souf, Farid & Oussama)	30	DJ Kayz album Paris Oran New York 2015
2017	"Fuego" (DJ Kayz feat. Souf)	44	
2018	"Beauté algérienne" (DJ Kayz feat. Souf & Mounir Kidadi)	174	

=== Music videos ===
- 24 June 2012: "Ce matin"
- 27 January 2013: "Mon amour pour elle"
- 8 May 2013: "Histoire d'un premier amour"
- 30 June 2013: "Danse avec moi"
- 31 October 2013: "Effacer"
- 2 March 2014: "Elle me rend fou"
- 30 May 2014: "Te dire merci"
- 1 July 2015: "Plus que des mots"
- 9 October 2015: "Après minuit"
- 23 October 2015: "Beauté marocaine"
- 1 January 2016: "Regarde moi"
- 29 January 2016: "Sans abris"
- 26 February 2016: "Mi Amor"
- 27 May 2016: "Echoué"
- 28 June 2016: "Mea Culpa"
- 28 July 2016: "Ma Bella"
- 29 September 2017: "Fuego"
- 8 June 2018: "Una noché"
- 1 July 2018: "Beauté algérienne"
- 19 September 2018: "Wili Wili"
- 10 October 2018: "Abusé"
- 18 February 2019: "5/5"
- 29 March 2019: "Di Caprio"
- 1 May 2019: "Ça c'est fait"
- 4 September 2019: "Bye Bye"
- 14 February 2020: "Appel masqué"
- 1 July 2020: "Plus jamais"
- 7 April 2021: "Fiancer"
- 15 June 2021: "Stop Là"
- 26 April 2022: “Tout Doux”
