= Vissla med mig =

2013 single by Panetoz

Single by Panetoz

from the album Det blir vad du gör det till
- Released: April 22, 2013
- Recorded: 2012–2013
- Genre: Pop
- Length: 3:34
- Label: Warner Music Sweden

Panetoz singles chronology
"Dansa Pausa" (2012)	"Vissla med mig" (2013)

Music video
- "Vissla med mig" on YouTube

"Whistle with Me"

Single by Panetoz
- Released: 2013
- Recorded: 2012–2013
- Genre: Pop
- Length: 2:34
- Label: Warner Music Sweden

Music video
- "Whistle with Me" on YouTube

"Vissla med mig" is a 2013 Swedish language song by Swedish band Panetoz and their follow-up single to the chart topping hit single "Dansa Pausa". The single was produced by Anders Lundström and released on 22 April 2013 with Warner Music Sweden.

An English version of the song was also released, titled "Whistle with Me".

== Charts ==
Chart performance for "Vissla med mig"
Chart (2013)	Peak position	Certification
Sweden (Sverigetopplistan)	45	Platinum
