= We Are Sthlm =

Annual youth music festival in Stockholm, Sweden

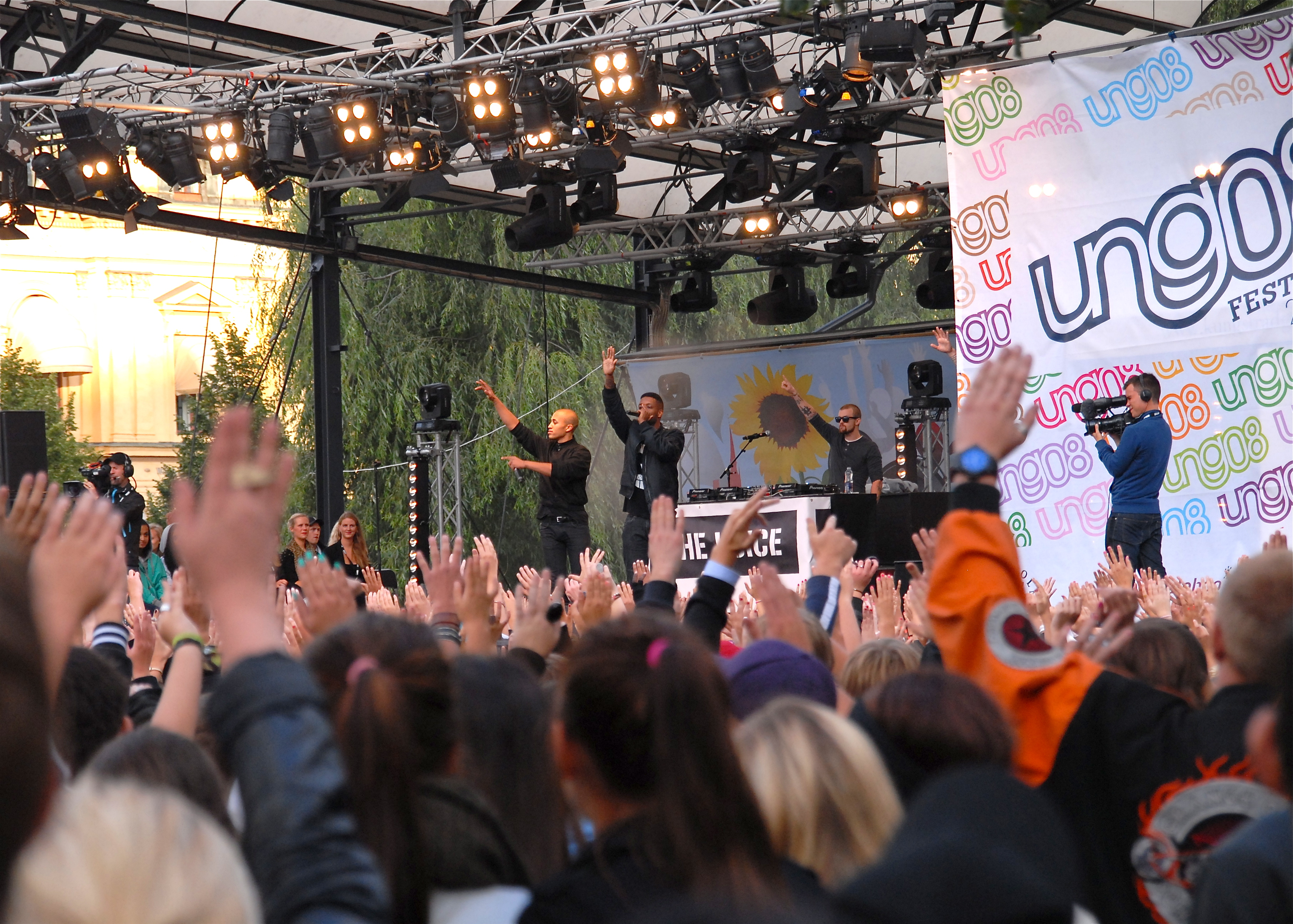
A performance during the 2011 event

We Are Sthlm is an annual youth music festival, intended for youths in the ages 13 until 19, in the Swedish capital Stockholm.

It was first established as a summer music festival for youth in 2001 under the name "Ung08" with free yearly public concerts and events in central Stockholm. The venture was successful and received support from Stockholm Municipality in 2003. In 2013, the festival was attended by 160,000 people and changed its name to "We Are Sthlm".

In 2015, there were reports that multiple sexual harassment incidents had been reported at the festival over the course of several years.

== Artists appearing ==
Artists who have appeared at Ung08 / We Are Sthlm have included:

- Adam Tensta
- Agnes Carlsson
- Albin Gromer
- Alex Moreno
- Alina Devecerski
- Anastacia (US)
- Andreas Tilliander
- Blues
- Brick & Lace
- Craig David (UK)
- Da Buzz
- Danny Saucedo
- Darin
- Darren Hayes (AUS)
- Elias and the Wizzkids
- Entombed
- Familjen
- Five (UK)
- Fjärde Världen
- Flo Rida (US)
- Geri Halliwell (UK)
- Gnucci Banana
- Good Charlotte (US)
- Hoffmaestro & Chraa
- Icona Pop
- Ison & Fille
- Jasmine Kara
- Jessica Folcker
- Kat DeLuna (US)
- Kim Cesarion
- Kings of Convenience (NO)
- Labyrint
- The Latin Kings
- Lazee
- Lloyd Banks (US)
- Ola Nordvik Myrstad (NO)
- Mack Beats
- Maskinen
- Mims (US)
- Mohombi
- Moto Boy
- Naïve New Beaters
- Natasha Bedingfield (UK)
- Newkid
- Näääk & Nimo
- Petter
- Panetoz
- Promoe
- Robyn
- Savant (NO)
- Sean Banan
- Slag Från Hjärtat
- Slagsmålsklubben
- Snook
- Sophie Ellis-Bextor (UK)
- Stockholmssyndromet
- Stress
- Swedish Radio Symphony Orchestra
- The Rasmus (FI)
- Those Dancing Days
- Timbuktu
- T-Pain (US)
- Zara Larsson

== Sexual assaults ==
In connection to the 2015 festival, Sveriges Radio reported that sexual harassment had occurred at the festival that year Dagens Nyheter reported that this had been a problem since it started in 2000, but that the information was withheld due to concern for the reputation of the event.

In 2014 and 2015, 38 incidents of sexual harassment at We Are Sthlm were reported to the police by female visitors to the festival, most of whom were under 15 years of age, but the Stockholm police did not publicize these incidents in their 2014 and 2015 press releases. After closing the festival earlier and changing order of the acts they managed to get a 90% decrease of the number of incidents.
