= Ego (Willy William song) =

2015 song by Willy Williams

Single by Willy William

from the album Une seule vie
- Released: 24 September 2015
- Recorded: 2015
- Genre: Electronic; · Halloween
- Length: 3:27
- Label: Scorpio; Play On; Warner Music
- Songwriters: Willy William; Zonee.L; Ansley Ford; Mathieu Evain
- Producer: Willy William

Willy William singles chronology
"Ego" (2015)	"Mi Gente" (2017)

Music video
- "Ego" on YouTube

"Ego" is a song by the French singer and producer Willy William. It was released on 24 September 2015 through Play On and Warner Music.

It reached a billion views on 14 September 2023, a few weeks after Dernière danse and Papaoutai, becoming the third French-speaking video to ever attain that number.

== Charts ==
=== Weekly charts ===
2015–2016 weekly chart performance for "Ego"
Chart (2015–2016)	Peak position
Belgium (Ultratop 50 Flanders)	16
Belgium (Ultratop 50 Wallonia)	3
France (SNEP)	12
Germany (GfK)	39
Hungary (Dance Top 40)	16
Hungary (Rádiós Top 40)	6
Hungary (Single Top 40)	18
Italy (FIMI)	18
Netherlands (Dutch Top 40)	4
Netherlands (Single Top 100)	10
Poland (Polish Airplay Top 100)	9
Switzerland (Schweizer Hitparade)	75
Turkey International Airplay (MusicTopTR)	1

2025 weekly chart performance for "Ego"
Chart (2025)	Peak position
Romania Airplay (TopHit)	82

2026 weekly chart performance for "Ego"
Chart (2026)	Peak position
Romania Airplay (TopHit)	80

=== Monthly charts ===
2025 monthly chart performance for "Ego"
Chart (2025)	Peak position
Romania Airplay (TopHit)	97

=== Year-end charts ===
Chart (2016)	Position
Belgium (Ultratop Flanders)	90
Belgium (Ultratop Wallonia)	65
Hungary (Dance Top 40)	62
Hungary (Rádiós Top 40)	56
Netherlands (Dutch Top 40)	26
Netherlands (Single Top 100)	46

Chart (2017)	Position
Hungary (Dance Top 40)	68

Chart (2024)	Position
Hungary (Rádiós Top 40)	34

2025 year-end chart performance for "Ego"
Chart (2025)	Position
Hungary (Rádiós Top 40)	82
Romania Airplay (TopHit)	147

== Certifications ==
Region	Certification	Certified units/sales
Belgium (BRMA)	Gold	10,000^{‡}
France (SNEP)	Platinum	133,333^{‡}
Germany (BVMI)	Gold	200,000^{‡}
Italy (FIMI)	2× Platinum	100,000^{‡}
Poland (ZPAV)	2× Platinum	40,000^{‡}
^{‡} Sales+streaming figures based on certification alone.
