= Willy William =

French DJ (born 1979)

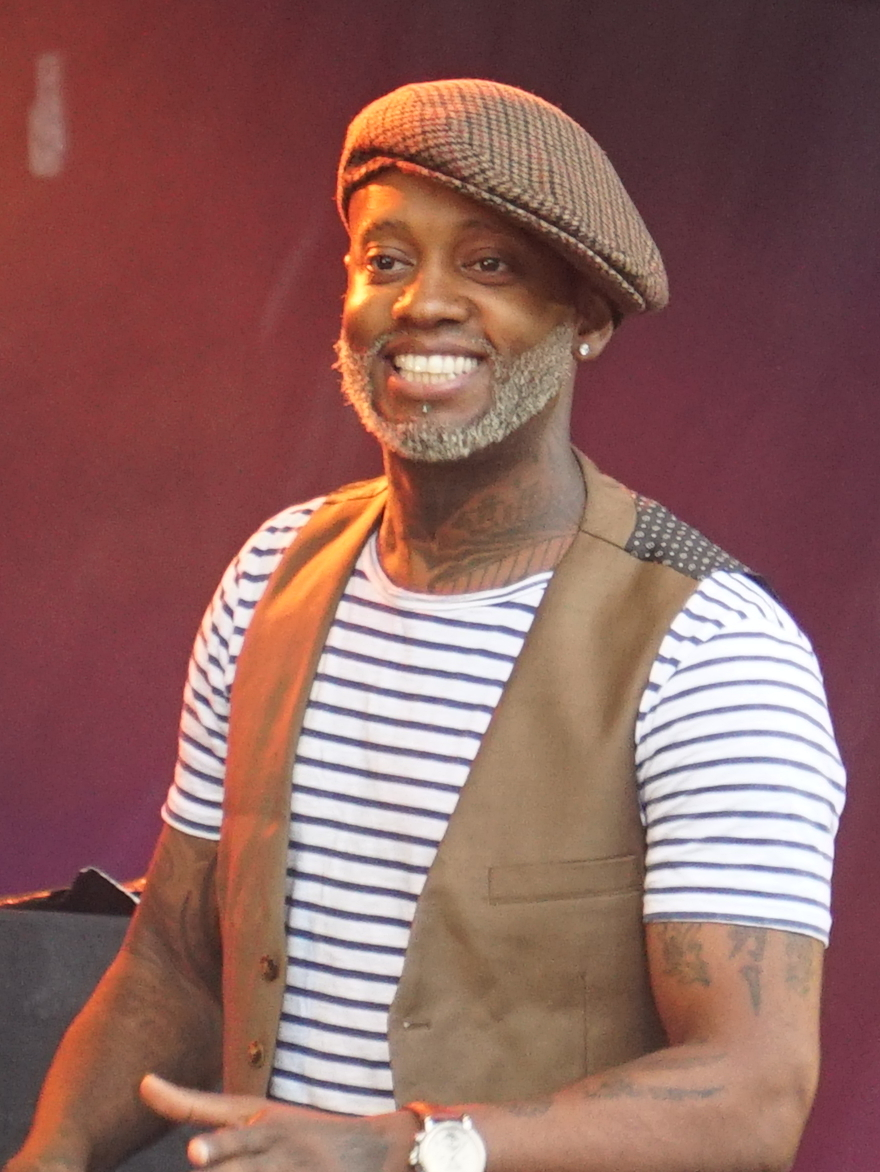
- William in 2016

Background information
- Born: Willy Fauade William; 27 June 1981 (age 45); Fréjus, Var, France
- Genres: Electronic
- Occupations: Disc jockey; record producer; singer; songwriter
- Years active: 2003–present
- Label: Scorpio Music

Willy Fauade William (born 27 June 1981) is a French DJ, record producer and rapper famous for his club remixes and vocal collaborations with a number of dance music artists. He is most famous for his French hit "Ego" and his Latin hit "Mi Gente", the latter with J Balvin.

== Early life ==
Willy Fauade William was born on 27 June 1981 in Fréjus, Var, to a Guadeloupean father and an Ethiopian mother from Eritrea. He was raised in Champagné, a commune in the department of Sarthe.

== Career ==
William came to prominence in 2003 with his work with DJ Flex in the dancefloor hit "B Boyz Shake da Body" and in 2004 as producer of "Tragedie" using the pseudonym "Lord William". He later joined the French music collective Collectif Métissé, also continuing to produce his own materials.

He collaborated with a great number of artists producing their songs and taking part in vocals as featured artists. He charted with collaborative songs with DJ Assad with "Li tourner", Les Jumo with "C Show" and "L'Italienne", and with Keen'V in "On s'endort?", Ridsa in "Je n'ai pas eu le temps" that also featured Ryan Stevenson on drums and many others.

In 2016, William got his major French hit with "Ego" which was produced and sung by himself. It was the main single from his 2016 album Une seule vie and his biggest French hit as a solo artist. "Ego" charted in France, Italy, Germany, Belgium and Poland amongst many others.

In 2017, he became an international sensation after the release of "Mi Gente" a collaboration with the superstar Colombian artist J Balvin. The huge international success of the song led to a version that also featured Beyoncé in a new remix. The song received a Latin Billboard Music Award and the music video amassed over 2 billion views and received in 2018 an MTV Video Music Award for Best Latin Video, maintained #1 Spotify Global for 12 consecutive weeks, while topping charts across the world as #1 in a great number of countries.

In 2018, William produced and released a dance track called "La La La" and he appeared on "Goodbye", a David Guetta and Jason Derulo song that featured William and Nicki Minaj.

== Discography ==
=== Albums ===
Title	Year	Peak positions		Track listing
Title	Year	FRA	BEL (Wa)	Track listing
Une seule vie	2016	12	20	1. "Te quiero" (radio edit); 2. "Ego" (radio edit); 3. "Une seule vie" 4. "Suis-moi" (featuring Vitaa); 5. "Le tour du monde" (featuring Natty Rico & Mika V); 6. "Dangereuse" (featuring Makassy); 7. "Qui tu es?" 8. "Tentation"; 9. "Les 6T d'or" 10. "Tes mots" 11. "On s'endort" (featuring Keen'V); 12. "Love"; 13. "Personne n'est parfait" (featuring JMI Sissoko); 14. "Les souris dansent" 15. "Dernier jour" (featuring Willy Denzey); 16. "Si j'étais le même"

=== Singles ===
==== As lead artist ====
List of singles as lead artist, with selected chart positions and certifications, showing year released and album name
Title	Year	Peak chart positions											Certifications	Album
Title	Year	FRA	AUS	BEL (Wa)	GER	ITA	NL	SPA	SWE	SWI	UK	US	Certifications	Album
"Te quiero"	2015	24	—	20* (Ultratip)	—	—	—	—	—	—	—	—		Une seule vie
"Ego"	2015	12	—	3	39	18	4	—	—	75	—	—	SNEP: Platinum; BEA: Gold; BVMI: Gold; FIMI: 2× Platinum	Une seule vie
"On s'endort?" (feat. Keen'V)	2016	36	—	10* (Ultratip)	—	—	—	—	—	—	—	—		Une seule vie
"Mi Gente" (with J Balvin)	2017	6	27	7	3	1	1	1	4	4	5	19	SNEP: Diamond; ARIA: 5× Platinum; BEA: 2× Platinum; BPI: 3× Platinum; BVMI: 2× Platinum; FIMI: 5× Platinum; GLF: 3× Platinum; IFPI SWI: Platinum; PROMUSICAE: 4× Platinum	Vibras (J Balvin album)
"Mi Gente (Remix)" (with J Balvin feat. Beyoncé)	2017	—	11^{1}	—	—	—	—	1	32	16	5^{1}	3^{1}	SNEP: Gold; ARIA: 3× Platinum; FIMI: Gold; PROMUSICAE: Gold; RIAA: 68× Platinum (Latin)	Non-album singles
"La La La"	2018	—	—	Tip**	—	—	—	—	—	—	—	—		Non-album singles
"Mambo" (with Steve Aoki featuring El Alfa, Sean Paul, Sfera Ebbasta and Play-N-Skillz)	2021	—	—	—	—	—	—	—	—	—	—	—		Non-album singles
"Trompeta"	2022	27	—	14	—	—	3	—	—	—	—	—	SNEP: Diamond; NVPI: Platinum	Non-album singles
"Solo" (with will.i.am and Lali)	2022	—	—	—	—	—	—	—	—	—	—	—		Non-album singles
"Boom, Boom, Boom, Boom" (with The Vengaboys)	2023	—	—	—	—	—	—	—	—	—	—	—		Non-album singles
"Cuentale" (with David Guetta and Nicky Jam)	2025	—	—	—	—	—	—	—	—	—	—	—		Non-album singles
"—" denotes a recording that did not chart or was not released in that territory.

Notes

- Note 1: Uses combined chart entries for "Mi Gente" and "Mi Gente (remix)"^{1}

*Did not appear in the official Belgian Ultratop 50 charts, but rather in the bubbling under Ultratip charts.
**Did not appear in the official Belgian Ultratop 50 charts, but rather in the bubbling under Tipparade charts.

==== Featured in ====
Internationally

Year	Single	Peak positions										Album
Year	Single	FRA	AUS	BEL (Fl)	BEL (Wa)	GER	ITA	NED	SPA	SWE	SWI	Album
2018	"Goodbye" (Jason Derulo and David Guetta featuring Nicki Minaj and Willy William)	93	33	20	15	47	92	16	33	16	50	David Guetta album 7
2019	"Highway" (Cheat Codes featuring Sofía Reyes and Willy William)	—	—	—	Tip**	—	—	—	—	— (Note: "Highway" did not enter the Swedish Singellista Chart, but peaked at number five on the Swedish Heatseeker Chart.)	—	Non-album singles
2020	"Loco" (SWACQ featuring Willy William)	—	—	—	—	—	—	—	—	—	—	Non-album singles
2026	"My Oh My" (Kris Kross Amsterdam featuring Luísa Sonza and Willy William)	_	_	_	_	_	_	_	_	_	_	
"—" denotes a recording that did not chart or was not released in that territory.

Francophone markets

Year	Single	Peak positions		Album
Year	Single	FRA	BEL (Wa)	Album
2010	"C'Show" (Les Jumo feat. Willy William)	—	—	
2013	"Je n'ai pas eu le temps" (Ridsa feat. Willy William & Ryan Stevenson)	76	—	Ridsa EP; Es tu fiesta (EP)
2013	"Es tu fiesta" (Ridsa feat. Willy William)	12	2* (Ultratip)	Ridsa EP; Es tu fiesta (EP)
2013	"Li tourner" (DJ Assad feat. Alain Ramanisum & Willy William)	12	2* (Ultratip)	
2014	"Alalila (Le Sega)" (DJ Assad feat. Denis Azor, Mario Ramsamy & Willy William)	76	14* (Ultratip)	
2014	"A l'Italienne" (Les Jumo featuring Willy William & Frédéric François)	—	—	
2014	"Me Gusta" (Dj R'AN featuring José de Rico, Willy William & Anna Torres)	—	—	
2014	"La demoiselle" (Miky Uno featuring Willy William)	—	—	
2015	"Englishman in New York" (Cris Cab feat. Tefa & Moox, Willy William)	16	26	Non-album singles
2016	"Keep My Cool" (Madcon feat. Willy William)	—	8* (Ultratip)	Non-album singles
"—" denotes a recording that did not chart or was not released.

*Did not appear in the official Belgian Ultratop 50 charts, but rather in the bubbling under Ultratip charts.
**Did not appear in the official Belgian Ultratop 50 charts, but rather in the bubbling under Tipparade charts.

=== Other songs ===
Year	Title	Peak positions		Album
Year	Title	FRA	BEL (Wa)	Album
2016	"Tes mots"	—	—	Une seule vie
2016	"Paris" (feat. Cris Cab)	106	—	
2016	"R.Q.T"	—	—	
2016	"Qui tu es"	—	Tip**	
2017	"Voodoo Song" (remake based on "Ego")	—	13* (Ultratip)	
2020	"Bollywood" (with Sandro Silva)	—	—	

*Did not appear in the official Belgian Ultratop 50 charts, but rather in the bubbling under Ultratip charts.
**Did not appear in the official Belgian Ultratop 50 charts, but rather in the bubbling under Tipparade charts.
