= Douk Saga =

Ivorian singer (1974–2006)

Stéphane Hamidou Doukouré (22 May 1974 – 12 October 2006), known professionally as "Douk Saga", was an Ivorian singer and the creator of Coupé-décalé music style alongside a dancing step. He popularized the music genre all over Africa and Europe, his most popular song in early 2000's was "Sagacité".

== Biography ==
Douk Saga was (born 22 May 1974) at Yamoussoukro, Côte d'Ivoire, died on October 12, 2006, in Ouagadougou, Burkina Faso

== Music career ==
Douk Saga's musical style and dancing steps remained history in Europe and Africa. He was the creator of Coupé-décalé music style, popularized with its own dancing step, involving hand gests like "Afuka Fuka" and also had a flamboyant lifestyle. In 2000's during Abidjan political crisis, Douk Saga's music was used to substitute war in Abidjan cum "Coupe" means (cut-off), the music genre had been widely received worldwide by music lovers.

== See also ==
- Coupé-décalé
