= DJ Assad =

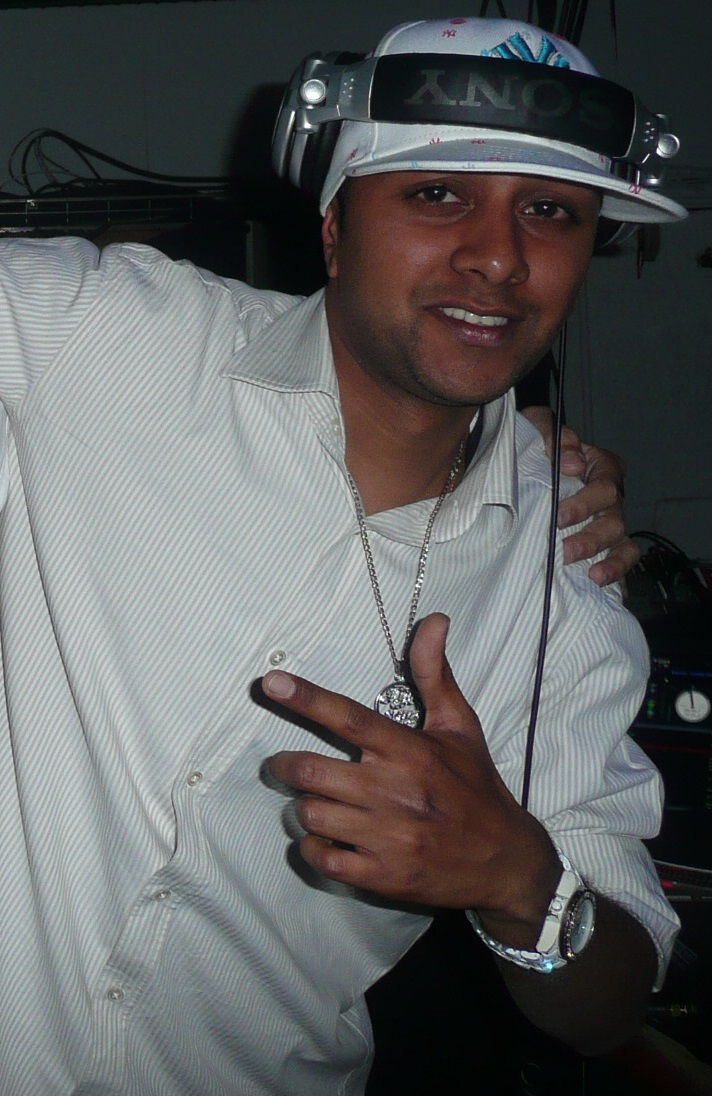
- DJ Assad In 2008

Background information
- Born: Adam Ashadally; December 14, 1982 (age 43); Mauritius
- Genres: Pop; dance
- Occupations: Singer; songwriter; record producer
- Years active: 2002–present

Adam Ashadally (born 14 December 1982), better known by his stage name DJ Assad, is a Mauritian-French DJ and record producer. He is best known for his Royal Mix radioshow on NRJ. The album Playground was released on June 7, 2010.

== Career ==
Assad was passionate about music from an early age. At age 18, he met with DJ Abdel and DJ Godjothai, and this launched his career in DJing; he considered them his mentors. Together with DJ Milouz, he launched the concept of "Royal Mix" on Radio FG in 2002. La Mixtape FG concept was born and he became a resident DJ with the station from 2002 to 2006, then moving to French radio station Fun Radio where he was given a regular spot on Saturdays from 7 to 9 pm to present his "Royal Mix".

In addition to his radio work, he found chart success in France with "Everybody Clap" and "Summer Lovin'", both credited to DJ Assad vs Maradja. He also mixed hit songs at various night venues like Pacha, Vip Room, Papagayo, Acapulco, Louise Gallery and Platinum.

In 2010, DJ Assad released his first album Playground with collaborations from Vincent Brasse, Big Ali, Willy William and Greg Parys with "For Your Eyes" as the main single from the album.

From August 2010, DJ Assad and fellow DJ Milouz moved the "Royal Mix" show to NRJ on Saturdays from 8 to 10 pm with Romuald Boulanger and later Léo Lanvin presenting the show. In September 2011, the show was reduced to 1 hour and was animated by Anto.

He is called to do the first part of the concerts in France by American artists Usher as well as that of Beyonce, Jennifer Lopez and Colombian international artist Shakira. In 2012, DJ Assad released the single during the summer season Make It Hot performed by singer Sabrina Washington and Addicted with the famous British singer Craig David and Mohombi and Greg Parys In December 2013, DJ Assad is chosen to take care of the first part of Will.i.am's French tour. In 2013, he released the title Li Tourner, sega Alain Ramanisum launched in 2001, remixed with Willy William. It will be a real card and he thus signs the hit of the summer of 2013, ranking number one in radio and in all the clubs of France, this title will earn him to win a NRJ DJ Awards and a gold record. In January 2014, he returns with a remix of the famous song Enamórame interpreted by Papi Sánchez in 2004 it also returns in the 2014 version accompanied by Luyanna. DJ Assad will choose to shoot the Enamórame music video in the heart of New York, a music video made by Dreamlife Productions, which also produced and directed the hits Li Tourner, Alalila and We Are One. In May 2014, DJ Assad released the single Alalila with Denis Azor, Mario Ramsamy and Willy William the single will rank among the top 5 hits clubs throughout the summer. DJ Assad is one of the rare DJs to have ranked 3 titles (Li Tourner, Enamorame and Alalila) in the top 5 of the hit club rankings during the same period (summer 2014). On November 12, 2014, he was nominated for the NRJ DJ Awardsin the best French male DJ category alongside David Guetta, Antoine Clamaran, DJ Snake and the Daft Punk. In December 2014, DJ Assad released the single We Are One with singer Greg Parys, this song symbolizes the unity of peoples and the richness of diversity. In 2017 DJ Assad is composer on the title of J Balvin’s super hit, Mi gente, featuring Willy William.

== Discography ==
=== Albums ===
Year	Album	Peak positions	Notes
Year	Album	FR	Notes
2011	Playground	174	

=== Singles ===
Year	Single	Peak positions		Certification	Album
Year	Single	FR	BEL (Wa)	Certification	Album
2008	"Everybody Clap" (DJ Assad vs Maradja)	25	–		
2008	"Summer Lovin'" (DJ Assad vs Maradja)	14	–		
2012	"Addicted" (feat. Mohombi, Craig David & Greg Parys)	97	15 (Ultratip)*		
2013	"Li tourner" (feat. Alain Ramanisum & Willy William)	12	2 (Ultratip)*		
2014	"Enamorame (Oui bébé)" (feat. Papi Sanchez & Luyanna - Tropical Family)	–	24 (Ultratip)*		
2014	"Alalila (le Sega)" (feat. Denis Azor, Mario Ramsamy & Willy William)	76	14 (Ultratip)*		
2015	"We Are One" (feat. Greg Parys)	–	–		
2016	""Le Temps Passe" (feat. Mohombi & Dalvin)	–	–		
2018	"Sweat" (with Laurell)	–	35 (Ultratip)*		
2020	"Candela" (with T Garcia)	54	–		
2021	"Hasta Luego" (with T Garcia)	54	–		
2021	"Case Départ" (with T Garcia)	54	–		

*Did not appear in the official Belgian Ultratop 50 charts, but rather in the bubbling under Ultratip charts.

Featured in

Year	Single	Peak positions		Certification	Album
Year	Single	FR	BEL (Wa)	Certification	Album
2014	"Twist 2k14" (Matt Houston feat. DJ Assad & Dylan Rinnez)	91	–		

Other releases

- 2007 : "Oh Oh" vs Maradja
- 2008 : "Just Dance" (feat. DJ Milouz & Kyle Evans)
- 2009 : "Come On Everybody" (feat. Greg Parys)
- 2009 : "For Your Eyes" (feat. Vincent Brasse)
- 2010 : "Playground" (feat. Big Ali & Willy William)
- 2010 : "So Far Away" (feat. Nadia Lindor)
- 2011 : "Pop My Life" (feat. Vincent Brasse)
- 2011 : "See U Again (Je Crois En Toi)" (feat. Gilles Luka & Nadia Lindor)
- 2012 : "Make It Hot" (feat. Sabrina Washington)

Songwriting

- 2017: "Mi Gente" - co-written with José Osorio, Willy William, Andrés David Restrepo and Mohombi Nzasi Moupondo - performed by J Balvin and Willy William
