= Mini Kawoulé =

Single by Jessy Matador

from the album Afrikan New Style
- Released: 2 February 2009
- Genre: Dancehall, Zouk, Ndombolo
- Label: Wagram

Jessy Matador singles chronology
"Décalé Gwada" (2008)	"Mini Kawoulé" (2009)	"Allez Ola Olé" (2010)

Music video
- "Mini Kawoulé" on YouTube

"Mini Kawoulé" is the second single by French singer Jessy Matador, from his debut album Afrikan New Style. It was released on 2 February 2008 in France and peaked at number 16 in the French Singles Chart. As of May 2011 it has had over 8.8 million hits on YouTube.

== Track listing ==
iTunes Digital download

1. "Mini Kawoulé" – 3:16
2. "Mini Kawoulé" (Music Video) – 3:10

CD single

1. "Mini Kawoulé" – 3:16
2. "Offset Gwada"
3. "Selesao"
4. "Mini Kawoulé"

== Chart performance ==
Chart (2009)	Peak position
European Hot 100 Singles (Billboard)	58
France (SNEP)	16

== Release history ==
Region	Date	Format	Label
France	2 February 2009	CD single	Wagram Music
