= Afrikan New Style =

Studio album by Jessy Matador
- Released: 24 November 2008
- Recorded: 2008
- Genre: Zouk, dancehall, reggae, hip hop, coupé-décalé, ndombolo, kuduro
- Label: Wagram Music

Jessy Matador chronology
Afrikan New Style (2008)	Electro Soukouss (2010)

Singles from Afrikan New Style
- 1. "Décalé Gwada" Released: June 2008; 2. "Mini Kawoulé" Released: December 2008

Afrikan New Style is the debut studio album by French singer Jessy Matador. It was released on 24 November 2008. It peaked to number 93 on the French Albums Chat.

== Singles ==
- "Décalé Gwada" was the first single released from the album; it was released on 23 June 2008; it reached number 14 on the French Singles Chart.
- "Mini Kawoulé" was the second single released from the album; it was released on 2 February 2009; it reached number 16 on the French Singles Chart.

== Track listing ==
No.	Title	Length
1.	"Intro"	1:20
2.	"Mini Kawoulé"	3:10
3.	"Décalé Gwada"	2:55
4.	"Telephone Rose" (feat. Perle Lama)	3:59
5.	"Afrikan Free Style" (feat. Anges d'Afrik)	2:56
6.	"Y a qu'a Demander"	2:56
7.	"Ambiance Groove"	2:43
8.	"Attrapez Botcho"	3:09
9.	"So Fine"	2:56
10.	"Selesao"	3:26
11.	"Socador"	3:24
12.	"Zot'Ok"	4:10
13.	"Say What"	3:23
14.	"Jour d'automne"	3:38
15.	"Mini Kawoule" (Remix 2)	3:09

== Chart performance ==
Chart (2008)	Peak position
French Albums Chart	93

== Release history ==
Region	Release date	Label
France	24 November 2008	Wagram Music
