= Panetoz =

Swedish multi-ethnic band

Panetos
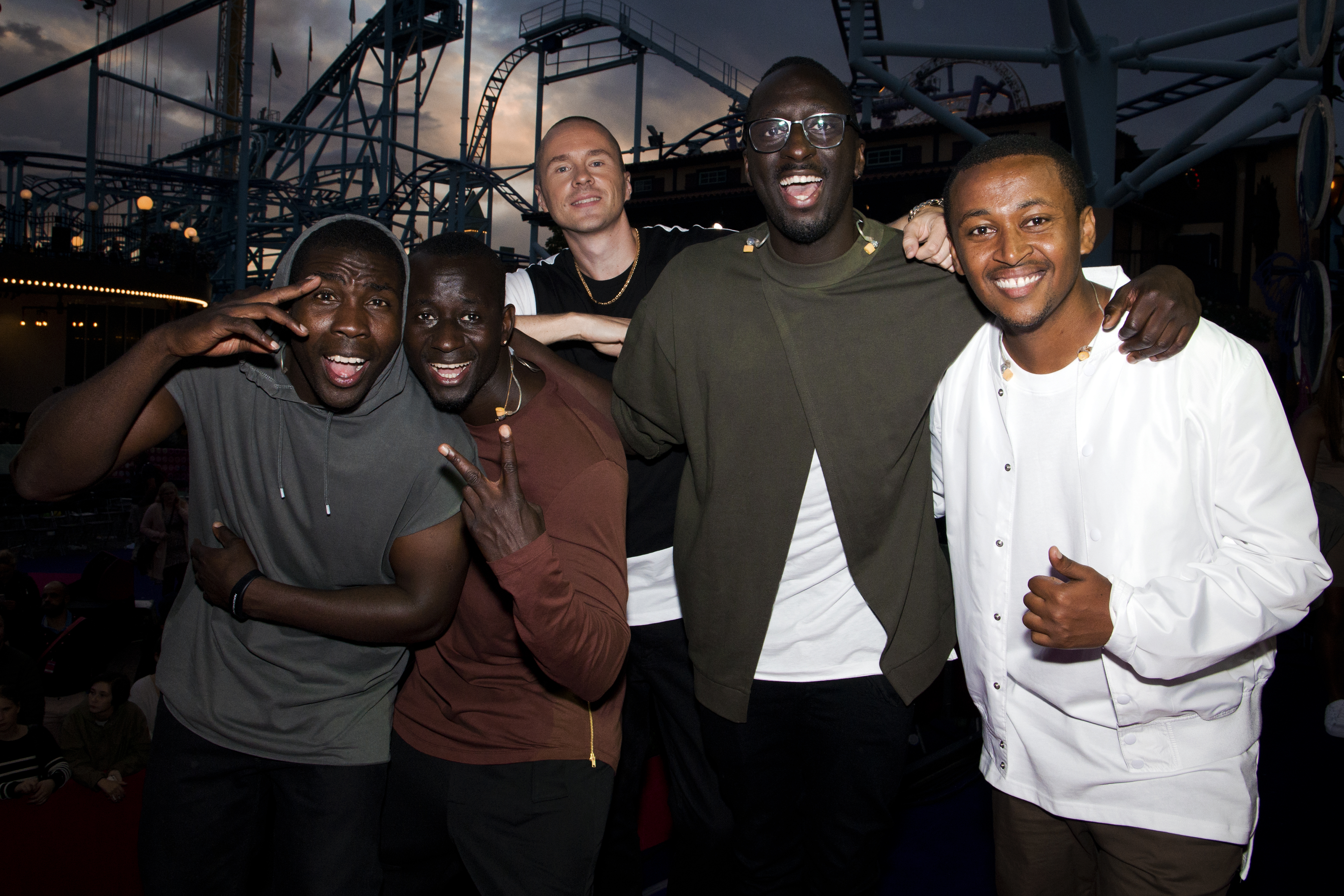
- Panetoz in 2016

Background information
- Origin: Jordbro, Sweden
- Genres: African music, hip hop, fusion music
- Years active: 2001–present
- Labels: Vägen Ut, Warner Music
- Members: Pa Moudou Badjie; Nebeyu Baheru; Johan Hirvi; Daniel Nzinga; Njol Ismail Badjie
- Past members: Tobias; Christian Omonomben
- Website: panetoz.com

Panetoz is a Swedish multi-ethnic band with members originating from Gambia, Ethiopia, Angola, Congo and Finland-Sweden. Panetoz are now signed to Warner Music that released their biggest hit, "Dansa pausa". Their repertoire is made up of a mix of Swedish language, English and various African languages with influences from traditional African music and Swedish hip hop and R&B.

== Career ==
=== Beginnings ===
Original band members of Panetoz were Pa Modou, Nebeyu and Tobias who were high school mates. Forming a trio band, they decided to name the group Panetoz by choosing the first two letters of their own names (Pa from Pa Modou, Ne from Nebeyu and To from Tobias). Their music teacher liked their potential and developed a musical project that included dance performances by the three. They were also offered to perform live gigs. Through initial encouragement, they wrote their initial tune called "Jordbro" in 2001.

Soon after Tobias left the project, but new members were invited to widen the band's appeal with Johan Hirvi being the first recruit after he took part in a compilation CD through Vägen Ut community multicultural musical project. Two other members, Christian Omonomben (aka DJ Flatline), and Daniel Nzinga joined in later.

=== Participation in Hitmakers ===
The band was introduced to the public when through an initiative of Daniel, Panetoz took part in Hitmakers, a Scandinavian reality show for songwriters on Sweden's Kanal 5 channel performing the song "Efterfest". The competition was open to participant songwriters from Sweden, Norway and Denmark. Panetoz applied in 2008 with three songs for consideration by 5 record companies from Scandinavia sitting as judges. The representative of the Danish record label Phatphase picked them, and offered to remix one of their songs. "Efterfest" was released as a digital single in Denmark, Norway and Sweden and the Danish artist Mosays made a remix of the song. But the signing with Phatfase fell through and Panetoz preferred to continue through their own independent means rather than sign with the Danish label.

=== Releases ===
The band has released many recordings independently through their own PNTZ Vägen Ut where their debut song was "Mama Africa" released on 11 August 2009 to coincide with their appearance at the Ung 08 festival in Stockholm. The song gained great popularity and was broadcast on radio stations like SR Metropol, Din Gata and P3 Street. They also opened for Busta Rhymes during their shows in Sweden. "Känn dig fri" was their follow-up release on 15 March 2010. It reached #2 on MTV's Top 7 at 7 show for new released music. "Mer än ord" featuring the vocals of Johan Hirvi followed "Känn dig fri" also in 2010.

But the group's release of "Dansa pausa" was what secured for them their first major chart success in Sweden and with many appearances on major Swedish radio stations and media outlets. The song reached #1 in Sverigetopplistan staying at the top for 3 consecutive weeks and was certified double platinum. An English language version charted in Belgian Ultratip. "Vissla med mig" charted briefly in Sweden reaching #45 in Sverigetopplistan. Produced by Sergio Elgueta, or Memo Crescendo as he's also known, it was written using Propellerhead Reason.

=== Melodifestivalen 2014 ===
Panetoz took part in Melodifestivalen 2014, the Swedish selection process to pick Sweden's entry to the 2014 Eurovision Song Contest which was to be held in Copenhagen, Denmark. The band presented the song "Efter solsken" (After sunshine) in semi-final 2 held in Linköping on 8 February 2014 qualifying directly to the Final 10 held in Stockholm Friends Arena on March 8, 2014, eventually finishing 9th in the final. Despite its loss, "Efter solsken" proved popular with the Swedish public and the song upon release as a single reached number four on the Swedish Singles Chart.

=== Melodifestivalen 2023 ===
Panetoz also took part in Melodifestivalen 2023, with their song On My Way, and made it to the final.

== Members ==
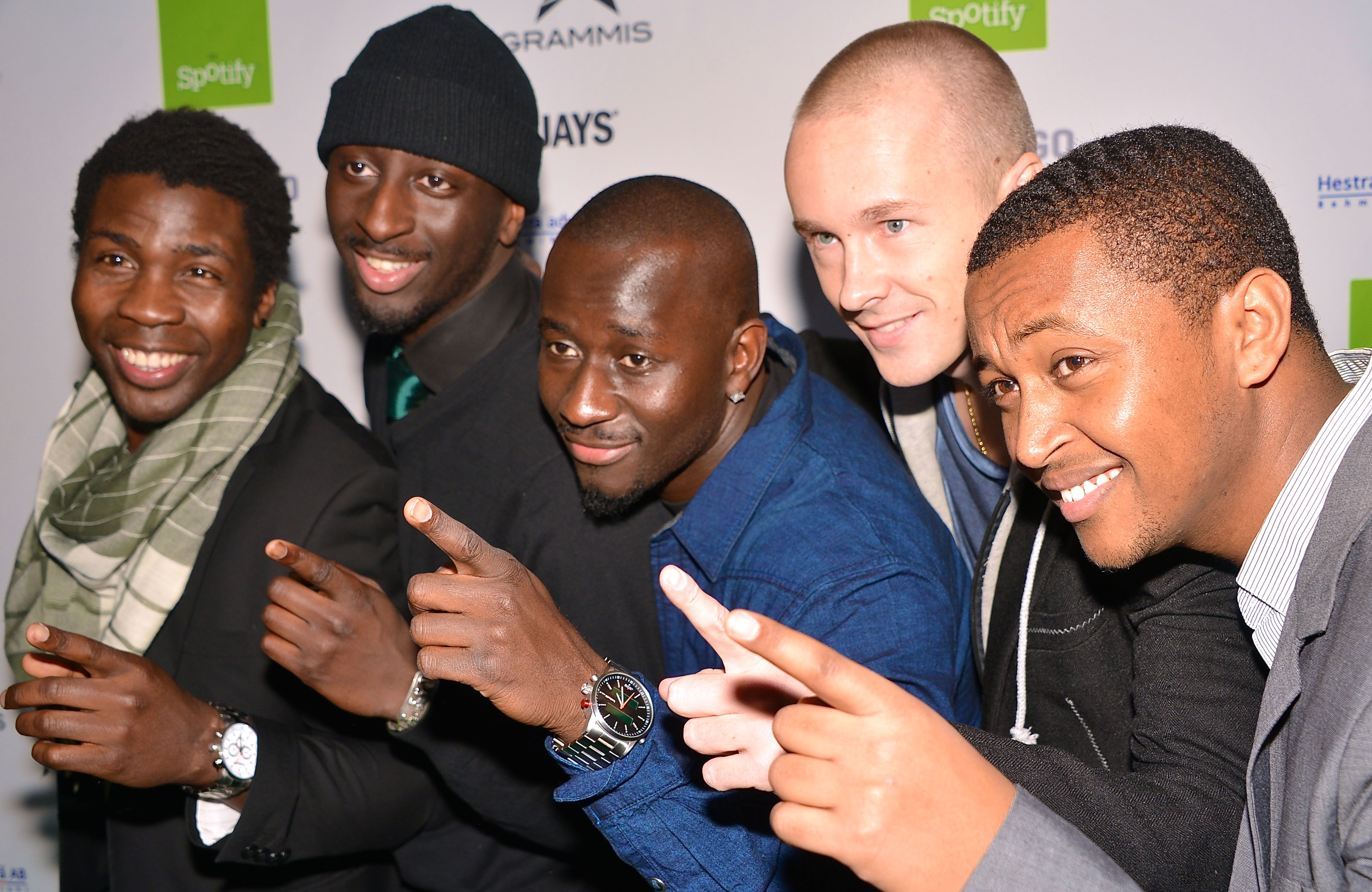
Panetoz current line-up

The band is made up of 5 individuals:

- Pa Moudou Badjie (of Gambian origin) immigrated to Sweden in 1996. An original member and band leader and most responsible for the musical output. He is also a studio manager at Haninge Jordbro based multicultural musical project Vägen Ut that provides studio facilities to aspiring artists through Haninge and two other locations in Stockholm.
- Nebeyu Baheru (of Ethiopian origin) was born to Ethiopian parents and grew up in Haninge. He studied economy and is the other original member of the band.
- Johan Hirvi (of Sweden-Finnish origin) was born to a Finnish father and a Swedish mother. He grew up in Haninge. He started music in intermediary school and wrote a few R&B style tunes. He had been invited to contribute to a compilation CD with other hip hop performers from Haninge through Vägen Ut. The project was sponsored and financed by the Haninge municipality. He joined in Panetoz in 2001 after the release of CD project he contributed in.
- Daniel Nzinga (of Angolan origin) was born in Angola and has lived in Sweden since 1990.
- Njol Ismail Badjie (of Gambian origin) the newest member in replacement of Christian Omonomben

Former members

- Tobias, a founding member of the band with Pa Moudou Badjie and Nebeyu Baherulla, but left to pursue other career paths
- Christian Omonomben (of Congolese origin, known as Chris aka DJ Flatline), grew up in Lidingö. He started music and dance in intermediary school. He is a "back-up" member and disc jockey for the band.

== Discography ==
=== Albums ===
Year
Title
Peak chart positions
Notes
SWE

2014
Det blir vad du gör det till
19

No.	Title	Length
1.	"Efter solsken"	3:10
2.	"Bubblar"	3:54
3.	"Joina oss"	2:48
4.	"Älska Ikväll"	3:28
5.	"Håll käften och dansa"	3:24
6.	"Hallå"	3:33
7.	"Sudra"	3:05
8.	"Speciell"	2:44
9.	"Kaos In Da House"	2:43
10.	"Mama Africa"	2:56
11.	"Känn dig fri"	3:12
12.	"Vissla med mig"	3:29
13.	"Dansa pausa"	2:59
14.	"När vi 2 blir 1"	3:01
15.	"Ooa hela natten"	2:56

=== EPs ===
Year	Title	Peak chart positions	Notes
Year	Title	SWE	Notes
2012	Dansa pausa (Remixes)	–	No. / Title / Length; 1. / "Dansa pausa" / 2:59; 2. / "Dance Pause (English)" / 2:56; 3. / "Dansa pausa (Swedish Mixed Language Version)" / 2:56; 4. / "Dansa pausa (House Remix)" / 4:22; 5. / "Dansa pausa (House Remix Extended)" / 6:28; 6. / "Dansa pausa (Instrumental Version)" / 2:56
2012	Le för mig	–	No. / Title / Length; 1. / "Le för mig" / 3:14; 2. / "Mama Africa" / 2:56; 3. / "Visa mig (Hoja hoje)" / 3:41; 4. / "Gör din grej" / 3:21; 5. / "Känn dig fri" / 3:12; 6. / "Dansa pausa (New Edit)" / 2:57

=== Singles ===
Title	Year	Peak chart positions		Certifications	Album
Title	Year	SWE	BEL (Fl)	Certifications	Album
"Dansa pausa"	2012	1	—	GLF: 8× Platinum	Det blir vad du gör det till
"Dance pause"	2012	—	— (Note: "Dance Pause" did not enter the Flemish Ultratop 50, but peaked at number 3 on the Ultratip chart.)		Det blir vad du gör det till
"Vissla med mig" / "Whistle with Me"	2013	45	—	GLF: Platinum	Det blir vad du gör det till
"Efter solsken"	2014	4	—	GLF: 2× Platinum	Det blir vad du gör det till
"Norge"	2015	— (Note: "Norge" did not enter the Swedish Singles Chart, but peaked at number nine on the Swedish Heatseeker chart.)	—		Non-album singles
"Håll om mig hårt"	2016	5	—	GLF: 2× Platinum	Non-album singles
"Om"	2016	88	—		Non-album singles
"On My Way"	2023	10	—		Non-album singles
"—" denotes a single that did not chart or was not released in that territory.

== Videography ==
- 2009: "Mama Africa"
- 2010: "Känn dig fri"
- 2010: "Mer än ord"
- 2012: "Dansa pausa"
- 2012: "Le för mig"
- 2013: "Vissla med mig"
- 2014: "Kaos In Da House"
- 2014: "Håll käften och dansa"
- 2014: "Älska Ikväll"
- 2014: "Norge"
