= Galera (song) =

Single by Jessy Matador featuring King Kuduro & Bra Zil
- Released: August 1, 2011
- Genre: Dance music
- Length: 2:56
- Label: Wagram Records

Jessy Matador singles chronology
"Dansez" (2011)	"Galera" (2011)	"Zumba He Zumba Ha (Remix 2012)" (2012)

Music video
- "Galera" on YouTube

"Galera" is a single by French singer Jessy Matador. The song featuring vocals from King Kuduro & Bra Zil; The original idea was born from the song titled "Galera" produced by the duo "BHB" Back Home Border Gianni Chiarparini & Nikholas Murphy; then the featuring with Jessy Matador that put his vocals on the instrumental beat. After that the song was released on August 1, 2011 in France and managed to peak to number 68 in the French Singles Chart. It samples the 1978 disco hit "Let's All Chant" by Michael Zager Band.

== Music video ==
A music video to accompany the release of "Galera" was first released onto YouTube on 3 October 2011 at a total length of three minutes and twenty-four seconds.

== Track listing ==
Digital download

1. Galera (feat. King Kuduro & Bra Zil) – 2:56

== Chart performance ==
Chart (2011)	Peak position
France (SNEP)	68

== Release history ==
Region	Date	Format	Label
France	August 1, 2011	Digital download	Wagram Music
