= Bebi Philip =

Ivorian musician

Bebi Philip (born 1988) is an Ivorian singer, songwriter, guitarist and music producer, associated with styles such as Coupé-décalé.

Phillip was born in Treichville, Abidjan, Côte d'Ivoire.
