= Erickson Le Zulu =

Ivorian disc jockey and singer (1978–2020)

- Born: Éric Bosiki; 1978; Abidjan, Ivory Coast
- Died: 16 February 2020 (aged 41); Paris, France
- Occupations: Disc jockey; singer

Erickson Le Zulu, stage name of Éric Bosiki (1978 – 16 February 2020) was an Ivorian disc jockey and singer.

== Biography ==
Le Zulu began singing at age 9 at his church in Zaire, while he began DJing in Ivory Coast. In 2006, Le Zulu won Male Performer of the Year at the RTI Music Awards in Ivory Coast.

Le Zulu was hospitalized as a result of Hepatitis B and cirrhosis of the liver, and died in Paris on 16 February 2020 at the age of 41.

== Discography ==
- Ouragan
- Suzanna (2003)
- Gloire (2007)
- Nouvelle Génération
- La main de Dieu
