= Jessy Matador =

French singer

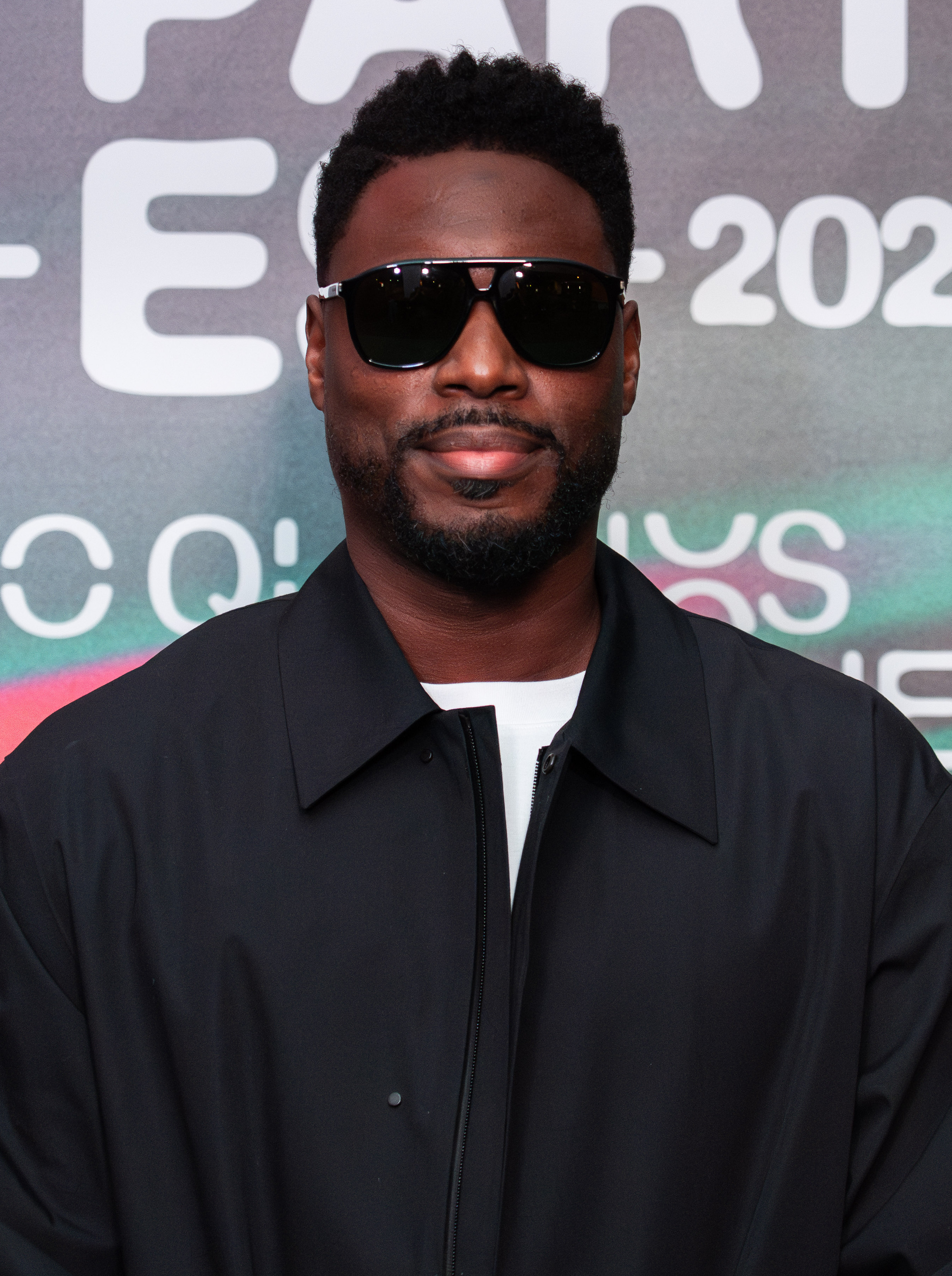
- Jessy Matador in 2025

Background information
- Born: Jessy Kimbangi; Paris, France
- Origin: Paris, France
- Genres: Zouk, dancehall, reggae, hip hop, ndombolo, coupé-décalé, kuduro
- Occupations: Singer, dancer
- Instruments: Vocals
- Years active: 2001–present
- Labels: Wagram Records
- Website: selesao.skyrock.com

Jessy Kimbangi (French pronunciation: [dʒɛsi kimbɑ̃ɡi]), better known by his stage name Jessy Matador, is a French singer.

== Biography ==
Matador began his career as a dancer in 2001. He later joined the group Dany Engobo’s band Les Cœurs Brisés (The Broken Hearts) with whom he toured the United States, Democratic Republic of the Congo, the United Kingdom, Italy and Canada. In 2005, he decided to create his own group called "La Sélésao" composed of members Dr. Love, Linho and Benkoff. The same members also formed the first edition of the group Magic System. In late 2007, they signed with Oyas Records before signing with Wagram Records in spring 2008.

They released their début single "Décalé Gwada" in June 2008, becoming one of the hits of that summer. On 24 November 2008 the group released the album Afrikan New Style, a musical hybrid of African and Caribbean influences with more urban sounds. The style includes influences of zouk, dancehall, reggae, hip hop, Coupé-Décalé, ndombolo and kuduro. In December 2008, they released their second single "Mini Kawoulé".

== Eurovision Song Contest 2010 ==
On 19 February 2010, it was announced by France Télévisions that Matador would represent France in the Eurovision Song Contest 2010, to be held on 29 May 2010 in Oslo, Norway with the song "Allez Ola Olé". Jessy Matador placed 12th in the final, which was one of France's better results in the 2000s.

== Discography ==
=== Albums ===
Title	Album details	Peak chart positions
Title	Album details	FRA
Afrikan New Style	Released: 24 November 2008; Label: Wagram Music	93
Elektro Soukouss	Released: 14 June 2010; Label: Wagram Music	42
Authentik	Released: 28 June 2013; Label: Wagram Music	174

=== Singles ===
Year	Title	Peak chart positions										Album
Year	Title	FRA	BEL	DEN	FIN	GER	IRE	NOR	SWE	UK	US Dance	Album
2008	"Décalé Gwada"	14	73	—	—	—	—	—	—	—	—	Afrikan New Style
2009	"Mini Kawoulé"	16	—	—	—	—	—	—	—	—	—	Afrikan New Style
2010	"Allez Ola Olé"	1	4	30	7	17	39	5	34	81	88	Electro Soukouss
2011	"Dansez" (feat. Daddy Killa)	86	—	—	—	—	—	—	—	—	—	Electro Soukouss
2011	"Galera" (feat. King Kuduro & Bra Zil)	68	—	—	—	—	—	—	—	—	—	Non-album singles
2014	"Zuluminati"	166	—	—	—	—	—	—	—	—	—	Non-album singles
2015	"Johnny Bilayo"	172	—	—	—	—	—	—	—	—	—	Non-album singles
2017	"Mi Amore"	16	—	—	—	—	—	—	—	—	—	Non-album singles
"—" denotes single that did not chart or was not released.

=== As featured artist ===
Year	Title	Peak chart positions	Album
Year	Title	FRA	Album
2012	"Zumba He Zumba Ha (Remix 2012)" (DJ Mam's featuring Jessy Matador & Luis Guisao	7	Non-album single

=== Other singles ===
Year	Title	Peak chart positions	Album
Year	Title	FRA (Club)	Album
2009	"Y'a qu'à demander"	15	Afrikan New Style
2010	"Bomba"	—	Elektro Soukouss
2010	"Une affaire de chut"	—	Elektro Soukouss
"—" denotes single that did not chart or was not released.

Notes

- ^{1} Digital Download

Awards and achievements
Preceded by Patricia Kaas with Et s'il fallait le faire	France in the Eurovision Song Contest; 2010	Succeeded by Amaury Vassili with Sognu
