= Coupé-décalé =

Ivorian dance music genre

- Stylistic origins: Zouglou; ndombolo; techno; tribal house; soca; reggae
- Cultural origins: Early 2000s
- Typical instruments: PC; turntables; drum machine; vocals

Coupé-décalé (French pronunciation: [kupe dekale]) is a type of popular dance music originating in Côte d'Ivoire. Drawing heavily from zouglou and ndombolo with other African influences, coupé-décalé is a very percussive style, featuring African samples, deep bass, and repetitive minimalist arrangements.

The genre was developed around 2001 by a group of young Ivorian club promoters and performers known as the Jet Set, led by Douk Saga. These performers, referred to as atalakus (hype men), gained recognition for their flamboyant performances, ostentatious fashion, and theatrical displays of wealth. The movement popularized Nouchi slang terms such as farot farot (to flaunt wealth) and travaillement (lavish distribution of cash), drawing inspiration from Congolese sapeur subculture. The terms "coupé" ("to cheat") and "décalé" ("to run away") were introduced by DJ Jacob in reference to the music and the accompanying dance styles, although Douk Saga is credited with creating and globalizing the concept, particularly with the 2003 hit "Sagacité".

Coupé-décalé emerged as a dominant cultural force during the political and social unrest that followed the 2002 outbreak of the First Ivorian Civil War. Amid curfews and national division, the genre provided a form of escapism and expression for Ivorian youth, who gathered in maquis (local bars) and nightclubs to dance and celebrate resilience. The Yopougon district, particularly Princess Street, became a hub for the movement, where DJs evolved from background figures into leading artists. Each song often introduced a new dance move or gesture that fueled the genre's popularity. The genre's second wave was led by artists such as DJ Arafat, who helped modernize and internationalize the genre with a more aggressive atalaku style and a digitally driven sound, ultimately becoming one of the genre's most influential figures. Other prominent artists include Serge Beynaud, Debordo Leekunfa, Mix Premier (DJ Mix), DJ Lewis, and others.

== Etymology ==
Coupé-décalé derives its name from Nouchi. According to journalist Siddhartha Mitter, coupé means "to cheat" while décalé means "to run away". Together, the phrase expressed a rebellious mindset linked to "beating the system" and escaping social or economic hardships, especially those associated with Western or colonial systems, in a way similar to the idea of "The Man" in American counterculture. Early coupé-décalé songs often celebrated people who achieved wealth or success abroad through cunning or resourcefulness. The term boucantier, which literally means "shoemaker" in French, came to describe artists known for flashy clothing or extravagant lifestyles, and later to fans and imitators of the movement.

Other interpretations of the genre's name have been suggested as well. In Tradition et modernité dans la musique de l'Afrique occidentale, musicologist Olivier Rivera Micalef argued that DJ Jacob was the first person to use the words coupé ("cut") and décalé ("shift") to describe particular dance movements performed by the Jet Set collective. Even though DJ Jacob introduced the terms, Douk Saga is generally considered the central figure who organized, expanded, and brought coupé-décalé to international audiences.

== History ==
Coupé-décalé was developed among the Ivorian diaspora in Paris rather than in West Africa itself. According to Ivorian researcher El Hadji Yaya Koné, Congolese dance styles such as kwassa kwassa and ndombolo were the main influences behind the movement. The genre emerged in the early 2000s through a group of young Ivorians known as atalakus, a term that originated in Congolese music, specifically with the band Zaïko Langa Langa in 1982, used for club hype men and entertainers, who regularly gathered at the Atlantis nightclub in northeastern Paris. This collective became known as the Jet Set and was led by Douk Saga. The group became famous for their energetic performances, flamboyant fashion, and ostentatious displays of wealth, especially the practice of throwing money to club audiences, a performance style known as travaillement. Strongly influenced by the fashion culture of Congolese La Sape, the Jet Set emphasized extravagant clothing and theatrical stage performances, which became central features of coupé-décalé. Their music often relied on sampled sounds and rhythmic vocal animation, while many of their dance moves were inspired by everyday actions or adapted from earlier Congolese dances. Although some observers attempted to connect the movement to traditional Ivorian culture, including claims that certain dance gestures came from Akoupé society, El Hadji Yaya Koné argued that this explanation was unlikely. He noted that Akoupé is mainly the name of a locality in southern Côte d'Ivoire and concluded that coupé-décalé's dance styles were more directly connected to modern Congolese dance culture than to older Ivorian traditions.

In 2002, during the First Ivorian Civil War, Douk Saga released the hit "Sagacité", which is built around atalaku-style vocal techniques and became the first hit of the genre as it resonated in a society affected by political instability and economic hardship.

Although arising from this time of political turmoil, coupé-décalé lyrically addresses topics such as relationships, earning money and maintaining a good mood or 'bonne ambiance'. These themes helped to popularized the genre across Africa and the diaspora. In February 2009, Akwaaba Music released an Ivorian and Ghanaian compilation, one of the first legal worldwide releases of coupé décalé. The compilation features music by DJ Menza, DJ Bonano, DJ Mix 1er & Eloh DJ and Kedjevara.

== Movements within coupé-décalé ==
In 2008, Georges Dyoula distinguished 3 waves in the development of coupé-décalé:

- 1st wave, ~2002–2004: The appearance, success and domination of the Jet Set, DJ Allan, DJ Arafat, DJ Jacob, DJ Serpent Noir, DJ Christy-B, DJ Arsenal, Don Mike le Guru, Bloco, Erickson le Zulu, DJ String, DJ Ressource, Shégal Mokonzi, Mama Ministre, Youlés Inter, DJ Jeff, Ayano.
- 2nd wave, 2005–2006: This period is essentially led by "la danse de la Moto" and dances relating to football (Konami, Drogbacité, Kolocité). The appearance, success and domination of Boulevard DJ, DJ Bombastik, DJ Rodrigue, Shanaka Yakusa, Danny Blue DJ, DJ Gaoussou, Oxxy Norgy, Roland Le Binguiss, Douk Saga, Christina DJ, Le Molare, Solo Béton, Erickson le Zulu, DJ Zidane, Ligue DJ, DJ Disconty, Kilabongo, PS One DJ.
- 3rd wave – 2006–2010: The 3rd wave includes the most new artists and new derivative styles of dance. This wave is also associated with a 'Congolization' of rhythms, lyrics and artists. The appearance, success and domination of DJ Lewis, DJ Bonano, DJ Roi Lion, Francky Dicaprio, Flamzy DJ, Joscar DJ, DJ Mix, Elloh DJ, DJ Phéno, Mustapha Al Kabila, Mareshal DJ, Harmony, Maty Dollar, Linda de Lindsay, Ronaldo R9, DJ TV3, Debordeaux DJ, Erickson le Zulu, Dollar-R, Miki Dollar, TPJ New Version, Jean-jacques Kouamé, Abou Nidal.

== Socio-political interpretations ==
In 2005, Vladimir Cagnolari suggested that the music is a way Ivorians are coping with their unstable political situation.

"For a few hours, the rooms is transformed into an ephemeral temple of festival/party, using carefreeness and amusement to counter the socio-political problems of a country still waiting for peace. ... In a musical landscape dominated by patriotic and military music, coupé-décalé arrives like a breath of fresh air to forget the difficult context in which Ivorians are living."

In 2006, Dominik Kohlhagen wrote:

"Over the past three years, coupé-décalé has become one of the most thriving forms of popular music in francophone Africa. Produced by people who claim to have achieved "success" abroad, coupé-décalé represents "elsewhere" as a site from which one can achieve a certain status in consumer society so as to return home to be celebrated. This music expresses generationel transformations that affect lifestyles in Africa as well as ways of projecting oneself in the world."

== Artists ==
The prominent artists of coupé-décalé are Douk-Saga (Doukouré) with its Jet Set, DJ Brico, DJ Arsenal, Papa Ministre with his famous tune "Coupé-Décalé Chinois", David Tayorault, Afrika Reprezenta, and many other talented Ivorian artists. DJ Lewis is a particularly notable singer, famous for his Grippe Aviaire Dance (en: avian flu dance).

In 2005, Jessy Matador decided to create his own group called La Sélésao composed of members Dr. Love, Linho and Benkoff. The same members also formed the first edition of the group Magic System. In late 2007, they signed with Oyas Records before signing with Wagram Records in spring 2008. They released their début single "Décalé Gwada" in June 2008, becoming one of the hits of that summer. On 24 November 2008, the group released the album Afrikan New Style, a musical hybrid of African and Caribbean influences with more urban sounds. In June 2013, an upbeat dance song was released on YouTube by Minjin titled "Coupé-Décalé". It featured Iyanya, a Nigerian artist famous for his hit single "Kukere".

== Influences ==
Coupé-décalé draws its musical foundation from earlier Ivorian styles such as Zouglou and youssoumba, and was heavily influenced in its formative years by Congolese ndombolo, as well as Cameroonian makossa and Caribbean musical forms. Language played a notable role in its development, with early tracks often incorporating pseudo-Lingala as noted by Ivorian music journalist Diarra Tiemoko.

== See also ==
- Sub-Saharan African community of Paris
