= Heineken (disambiguation) =

Heineken is a pale lager beer.

Heineken may refer to:

- Heineken N.V., Netherlands based brewing company
  - Heineken Asia Pacific
  - Heineken Hungária
  - Heineken Lanka
  - Heineken Laos
  - Heineken Malaysia
  - Heineken Srbija
- Heineken brands, beer produced by Heineken International
- Heineken Oud Bruin, oud bruin beer
- Heineken Premium Light, low alcohol beer

== Sport ==
- Heineken Cup, Rugby union competition
- Heineken Open (tennis), New Zealand tennis tournament
- Catalan Open, former golf tournament known as the Heineken Open
- Holland Heineken House, a Dutch meeting place during the Olympic Games
- Heineken (yacht), a yacht

== Other uses ==
- Heineken (surname)
- Heineken Music Hall, music venue in Amsterdam, Netherlands
- Dr A.H. Heineken Prize
