= Newcastle Brown Ale =

Brown ale

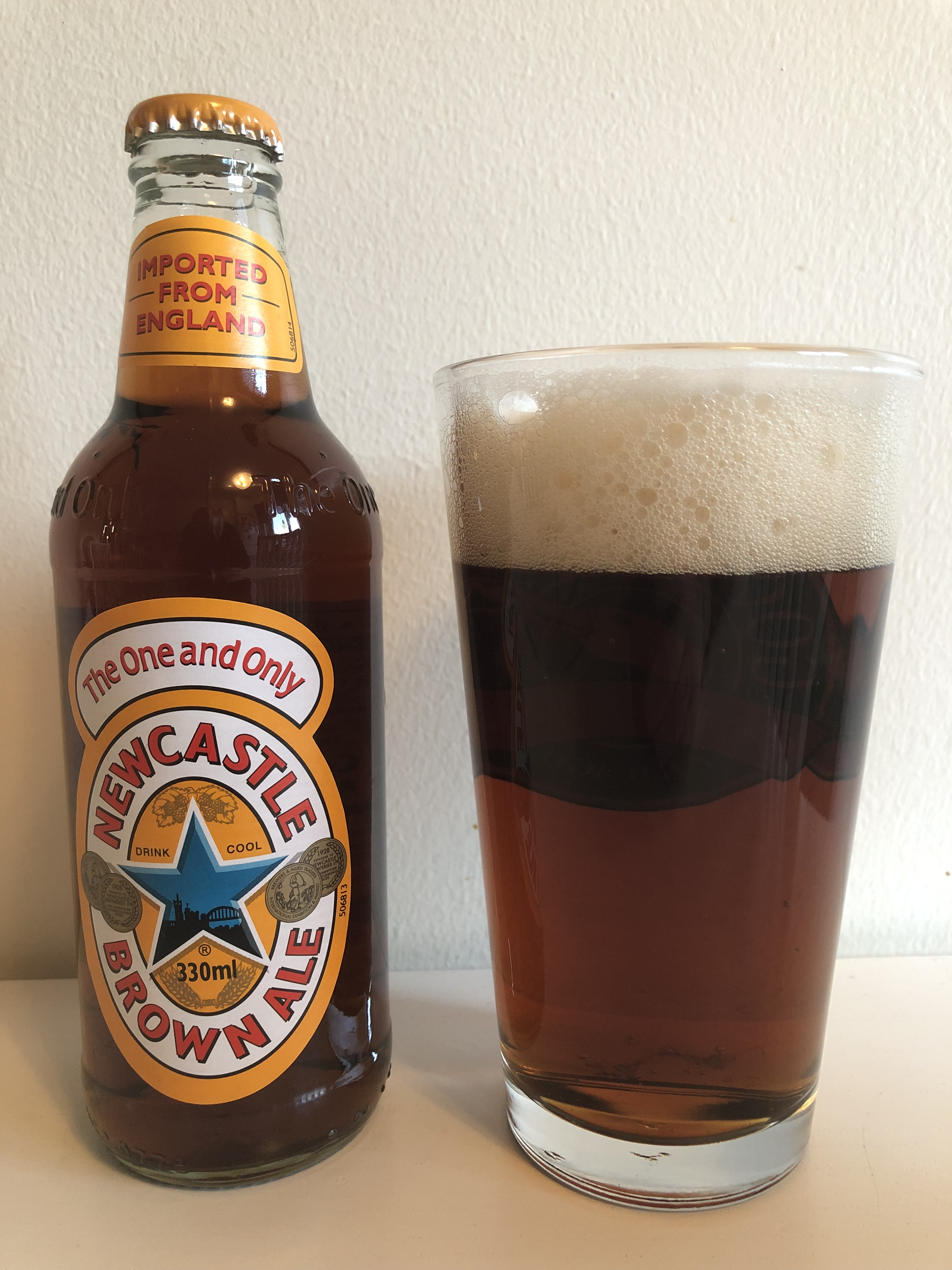
- Newcastle Brown Ale poured into a pint glass
- Type: Brown ale
- Manufacturer: Heineken
- Distributor: Heineken
- Origin: England
- Introduced: 1927; 99 years ago
- Alcohol by volume: 4.7%
- Colour: Red-brown
- Website: newcastlebrown.com

Newcastle Brown Ale is a brown ale, originally brewed in Newcastle upon Tyne, England. It was launched in 1927 by Colonel Jim Porter after three years of development. The 1960 merger of Newcastle Breweries with Scottish Brewers afforded the beer national distribution, and UK sales peaked in the early 1970s. The beer underwent a resurgence in the late 1980s and early 1990s with student unions selling it. Brewing moved in 2005 from Newcastle to Dunston, Tyne and Wear, and in 2010 to Tadcaster. In 2017, the Heineken Brewery in Zoeterwoude, Netherlands, also began production. Between 2019 and 2024, Heineken's Lagunitas Brewing Company brewed a revised recipe for the American and Canadian markets, but the change was unpopular and Heineken resumed importing the original.

Newcastle Brown Ale is perceived in the UK as a working-man's beer, with a long association with heavy industry: the traditional economic staple of the North East of England. In export markets, it is seen as a trendy, premium import, being predominantly drunk by the young. It was one of the first beers to be distributed in a clear glass bottle and is most readily associated with this form of bottle in the United Kingdom.

== History ==
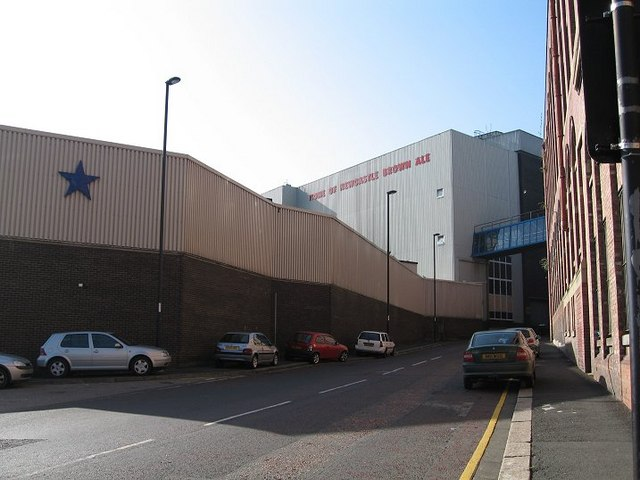
Tyne Brewery on Corporation Street, c. 2006, the same location in 2020

=== Tyne Brewery, Newcastle ===
Newcastle Brown Ale was originally created by Lieutenant Colonel James ('Jim') Herbert Porter (b. 1892, Burton upon Trent), a third-generation brewer at Newcastle Breweries, in 1927. Porter had served in the North Staffordshire Regiment in the First World War, earning his DSO with Bar, before moving to Newcastle. Porter had refined the recipe for Newcastle Brown Ale alongside chemist Archie Jones over a period of three years. When Porter actually completed the beer, he believed it to be a failure, as he had actually been attempting to recreate Bass ale. The original beer had an original gravity of 1060º and was 6.25 ABV, and it sold at a premium price of 9 shillings for a dozen pint bottles.

Newcastle Brown Ale went into production at Tyne Brewery in 1927, with Newcastle Breweries having occupied the site since 1890, and brewing on the site dating back to 1868.

The blue star logo was introduced to the Newcastle Brown Ale bottle in 1928, the year after the beer was launched. The five points of the star represent the five founding breweries of Newcastle.

After the merger of Scottish Brewers with Newcastle Breweries in 1960, Newcastle Brown Ale became a flagship brand of Scottish & Newcastle alongside McEwan's Export and Younger's Tartan Special.

By 1997, Scottish and Newcastle claimed that it was the most widely distributed alcoholic product in both pubs and off licences in the country.

=== Move to Federation Brewery, Gateshead ===
Despite investing £16.6 million in a new bottling plant at the Tyne Brewery in 1999, Scottish and Newcastle announced its closure on 22 April 2004, in order to consolidate the brewing of beer and ale at the Federation Brewery site in Dunston, Gateshead, which was to pass to them with their £7.2m purchase of the Federation Brewery. The purchase and consolidation at Dunston created the new brewing company, Newcastle Federation Breweries.

The last production run of Brown Ale in Newcastle came off the Tyne Brewery line in May 2005. Pre-production trial brews were conducted at Dunston to ensure there was no change in its taste after the move.

The Tyne Brewery site was bought by a consortium of Newcastle University, Newcastle City Council, and the regional development agency One NorthEast, as part of the wider Newcastle Science City project. Demolition of the former brewery began on 8 March 2007. The triggering of the controlled demolition of the former Barrack Road bottling plant opposite St James' Park was ceremonially performed by Sir Bobby Robson on 22 June 2008.

=== Move to John Smith's Brewery, Tadcaster ===
Bottling of Newcastle Brown Ale moved to the John Smith's Brewery in Tadcaster, North Yorkshire, in 2007.

Heineken bought Scottish and Newcastle in a joint deal with Carlsberg in 2008.

In 2010, Scottish and Newcastle closed the Dunston brewery, moving production of Brown Ale to the John Smiths Brewery in Tadcaster. The company cited the general fall in the market for beer, over-capacity in its plants in general, and the fact that the Dunston site was operating at just 60% capacity—despite the fact that sales of Newcastle Brown Ale had never been higher—as reasons for the closure.

In 2015, the caramel colouring, which has been used since the beer was launched, was removed for health reasons. Instead, roasted malt was used to darken the beer.

=== Move to Zoeterwoude Brewery, the Netherlands ===
In 2017, Heineken moved some production from the John Smith's Brewery, Tadcaster, to the Zoeterwoude Brewery in the Netherlands. The company claimed this would allow for shorter order lead times and faster transportation to the U.S. and allow distributors to purchase by the pallet rather than the container. Newcastle Brown Ale is still brewed in Tadcaster, Yorkshire, for the UK, some EU markets, and since late 2024 for North America.

=== Move to Lagunitas Brewing Company, USA ===
Between 2019 and 2024, the company moved production for the US and Canadian markets to Lagunitas Brewing Company (a Heineken subsidiary), which produced the beer at its breweries in Chicago and Petaluma. In an effort to appeal to American craft beer trends, Heineken revised the recipe to include more hops, but the change was unpopular. The recipe was discontinued and imports from Tadcaster resumed in late 2024.

== Production and distribution ==
Newcastle Brown Ale is brewed with pale malt and crystal malt. It has a lower hopping rate than traditional English bitters.

The beer is one of the United Kingdom's leading bottled ales and is in the top 20 highest-selling ales overall, selling around 100,000 hL (2,200,000 imp gal; 2,600,000 US gal) annually. At the time of brewing moving to Dunston in 2005, Newcastle Brown was being exported to 41 countries. At times, over half of the brewery's output is directed overseas to the U.S. In 2010, more than 640,000 hL (14,000,000 imp gal; 17,000,000 US gal) of the beer were sold in the United States, more than double the 2001 total.

In Canada and France (Brittany), the beer is available in short and tall bottles and in cans. The beer is also available in British-themed pubs as a draught beer in Australia and New Zealand, brewed in the UK and imported by World Brands Australia Pty Ltd. The UK-brewed bottled, kegs, and cans are widely available in Australian liquor outlets as part of their international range. It is also popular in Canada, available on draught at many British-themed pubs.

== Names and phrases ==
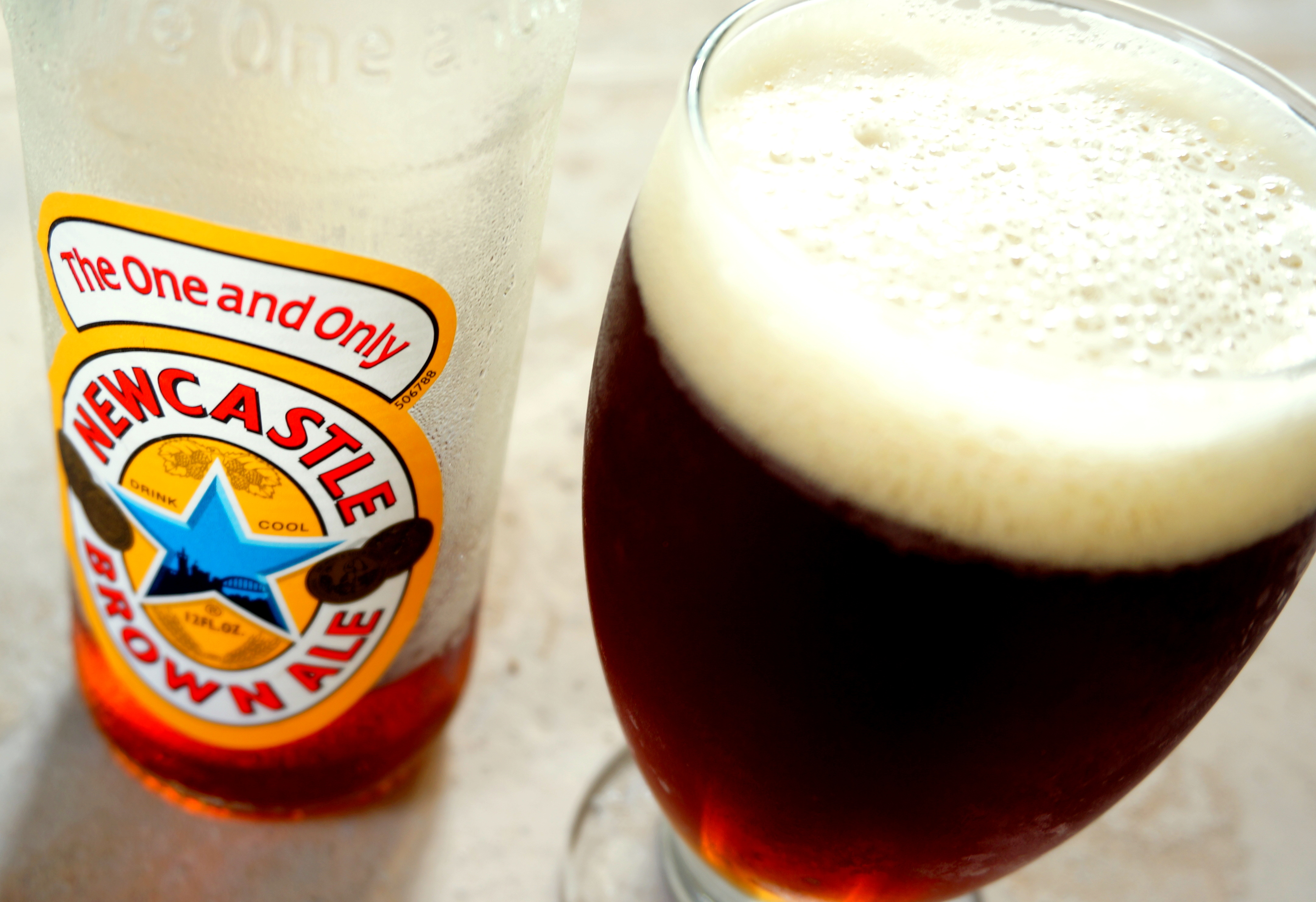
A glass of Newcastle Brown Ale

In 2000, the beer was renamed "Newcastle Brown" with the "Ale" being removed from the front label. This change, only in the UK, was due to market research claiming that the term "ale" was outdated and costing the company sales in the youth drinking markets. The older name was reinstated with no fanfare in 2004, when it was realised that the change had made no difference to sales.

In the North East, Newcastle Brown Ale is often given the nickname "Dog", alluding to the British euphemism of seeing a man about a dog. It is also known as Broon, "brown" pronounced in the Geordie dialect. Elsewhere in the UK, it is known as Newkie Brown.

== Serving ==
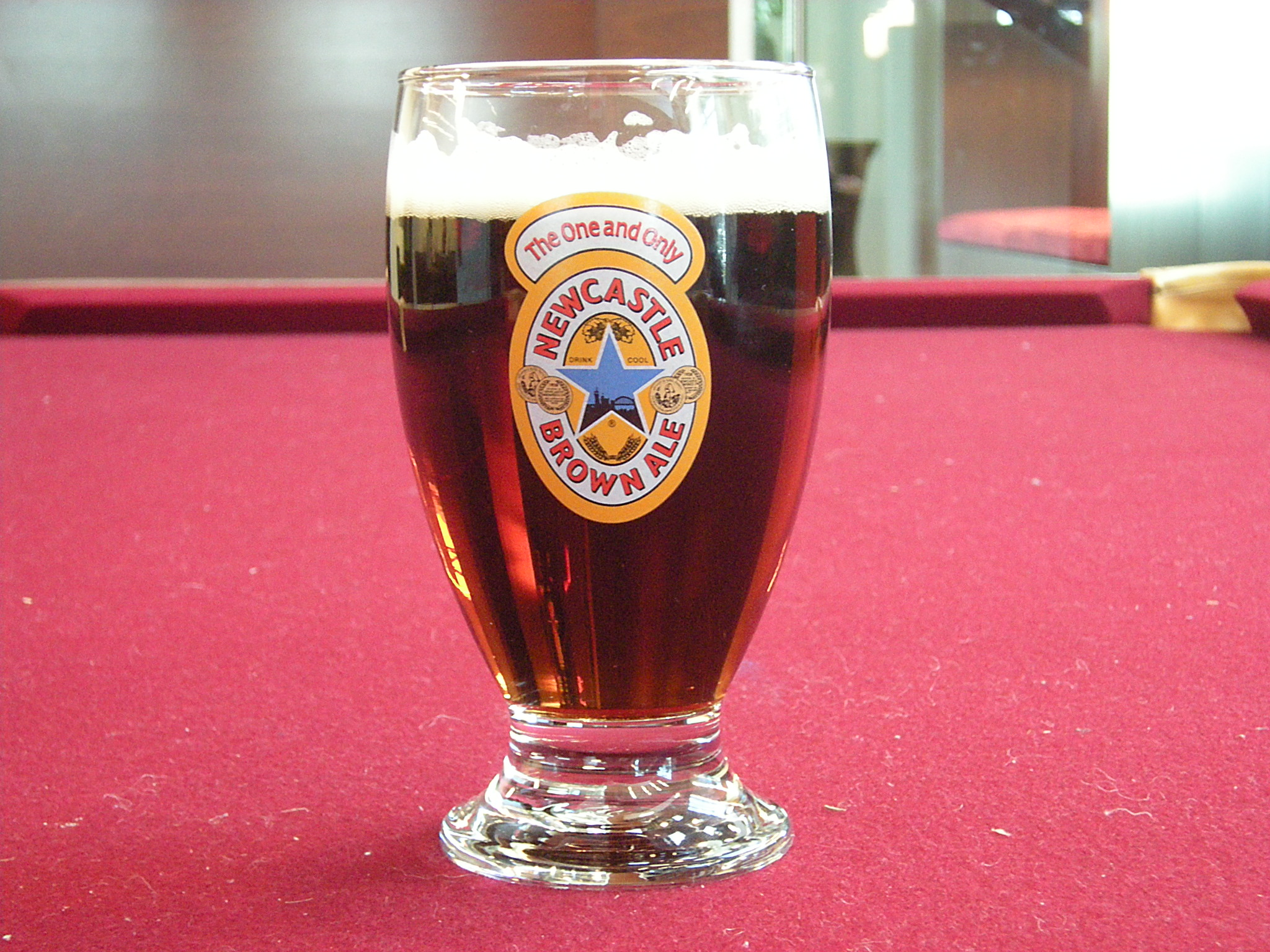
The Geordie Schooner

Newcastle Brown Ale is traditionally sold in Britain in 1-imperial-pint (568 ml; 19 US fl oz) and, more recently, 550-millilitre (0.97 imp pt) bottles. Typically, the ale is consumed from a 12-imperial-fluid-ounce (340 ml; 12 US fl oz) Wellington glass. This allows the drinker to regularly top-up the beer and thereby maintain a frothy "head". In the United States, it is sold in 12-US-fluid-ounce (350 ml) servings. In April 2010, Heineken USA introduced the Wellington glass, branded as the "Geordie Schooner," for Newcastle Brown Ale consumers in America. The glass features a nucleated base.

== Association with the North East ==
Like many British breweries, Newcastle Brown is strongly associated with its local area, in this case North East England. While the name provides a lot of this, the sponsorship of Newcastle United and the depiction of the River Tyne in the blue star has helped ensure its association. Its local provenance gave the brand an association with "hardy, working class traditions and values".

Under European Union Protected Geographical Status laws introduced in 1992, the name Newcastle Brown Ale was registered as a Protected Geographical Indication in 2000. In 2007, this was removed when brewing of the beer moved away from its place of origin to Tadcaster in Yorkshire. The company was not obliged to make a formal application to cancel it, but not move its production outside the area designated in its PGI application years before.

The closure of S&N's Dunston brewery in 2010 left Camerons Brewery in Hartlepool as the only remaining significant volume brewery in the North East of England.

== Variations ==
=== Special editions ===
When the Australian brewer Elders IXL launched a takeover bid for Scottish and Newcastle, locals of Newcastle began the "Keep Us on Top!" campaign. As a sign of solidarity, the Newcastle Brown label was inverted until the takeover was quashed.

In 2005, the last 3,000 bottles produced in Newcastle were given commemorative labels "121 years of brewing history, last bottles produced at Tyne Brewery April 2005." and given to the brewery staff.

In 2006, a special production run of 2.5 million bottles celebrated the career of Newcastle United striker Alan Shearer, who had recently broken the club's scoring record and was about to retire from football. The brewery produced the special editions featuring Newcastle United's black and white stripes and Shearer's portrait, in exchange for a donation to Shearer's testimonial match, and they went on sale from 17 April that year.

In 2007, a special edition was released to celebrate local rock band Maxïmo Park. The label was designed by the band and the beer released to coincide with the band's concert at Newcastle Metro Radio Arena on 15 December. Also in 2007, a special 80th anniversary themed bottle was distributed.

In 2013, Newcastle partnered with Taxi Magic to brew a Black Ale called Newcastle Cabbie as part of an Anti-Drunk Driving campaign.

=== Other Newcastle brands ===
Newcastle Exhibition is a draught pasteurised keg beer (4.3% ABV) first introduced in 1929 and commonly found around the Newcastle area.

Newcastle Amber Ale (1032 OG) was a light ale available until the 1980s. It was a diluted version of Exhibition. Amber Ale and a much stronger aged stock beer were formerly blended to create Newcastle Brown Ale. This method was discontinued sometime before the brand was moved to Dunston.

Newcastle Star was a strong bottled beer (7.5% ABV) available from 1999 to 2006.

In 2010, Heineken USA launched Newcastle Summer Ale in bottles. In 2011, Heineken USA launched Newcastle Werewolf (fall ale) and Winter IPA. In 2012, Heineken USA will introduce Newcastle Founders ale (an Extra Special Bitter style) as their spring seasonal.

In 2012, Summer Ale (4.4%) and Founder's Ale (4.8%) were launched in Tesco across the UK.

In winter 2012, Newcastle winter ale (5.2%) and Newcastle nocturnal ale (4.5%) were also launched in Tesco stores across the UK.
