= Julius Lenck =

Hungarian-German brewer (1845–1901)

- Gyula Lenck
- Born: 1845; Sopron, Austria-Hungary
- Died: 14 October 1901 (aged 55–56); Sopron, Austria-Hungary
- Occupations: trader brewer
- Board member of: CEO Soproni Sörfőzde
- Children: Oszkár; Richár; Elza

Julius Lenck (Hungarian: Gyula Lenck, 1845, ? – 14 October 1901, Sopron, Austria-Hungary) was a Hungarian-German brewer, wholesaler and the founder of the Sopron Brewery (Soproni Sörgyár).

== Life ==
Lenck was a successful entrepreneur and managed chemical and soap works in Sopron. There was a great phylloxera epidemic in Hungary in the 1890s which destroyed most of the grapefields in the country. So people could not produce enough wine which made an impact on the economy of that region, because Sopron was even then famous for its wine. Lenck looked for other options and started a dialogue with beer producers from Brno, Moravia. They wanted to import Czech beer into Hungary because they also recognised the growing demand for beer.

Lenck wanted to produce beer in Sopron so he offered his chemical plant for the beer manufacture and established a common company with the Czech beer producers. As a result of that in 1895 the Első Soproni Serfőzde és Malátagyár Rt. (First Brewery and Maltmanufacture Co.) was founded. The owners were mainly Lenck and the Czech investors, but ordinary citizens of Sopron could also buy shares in the company above 400 000 Forints.

The first beer they produced got the name Arany Ászok which exists today also. The initiative was despite the nearly Austrian market at the beginning really successful. They made traditional beers, like Export Márciusi, Polgári and Udvari, and brown beers with the name Milleniumi.

At the end of the century the production reached 20 000 hectolitres.

In 1899 the company opened its own beer garten which had live music and social activities which made it very popular among the citizens of Sopron.

== Personal life ==
He was a member of the Evangelical-Lutheran Church. He had one daughter, Elsa and two sons, Oskar and Richard.

== Sources ==
- 1961. XV. 1–4 – Soproni Szemle (local historical journal; in Hungarian)
