= Heineken N.V. =

Dutch multinational brewing company

- Logo used since 2011
- Type: Public
- Traded as: Euronext Amsterdam: HEIA; AEX component
- ISIN: NL0000009165
- Industry: Drink industry
- Founded: 15 February 1864; 162 years ago
- Founder: Gerard Adriaan Heineken
- Headquarters: Amsterdam, Netherlands
- Area served: Worldwide
- Key people: Dolf van den Brink (chairman/CEO); Laurence Debroux (CFO)
- Revenue: ▼€29.821 B (2024)
- Operating income: ▲€ 3.929 B (2024)
- Net income: ▼€978 M (2024)
- Total assets: ▼€55.069 B (2024)
- Total equity: ▼€22.402 B (2024)
- Owner: Heineken Holding N.V (50.5%); Charlene de Carvalho-Heineken (23%)
- Number of employees: 89,264 (2024)
- Website: www.theheinekencompany.com

Heineken N.V. (Dutch pronunciation: [ˈɦɛinəkə(n)]), branded as The Heineken Company, is a Dutch multinational brewing company, founded in 1864 by Gerard Adriaan Heineken in Amsterdam. As of 2019, Heineken owns over 165 breweries in more than 70 countries. It produces 348 international, regional, local, and speciality beers and ciders, and employs approximately 85,000 people.

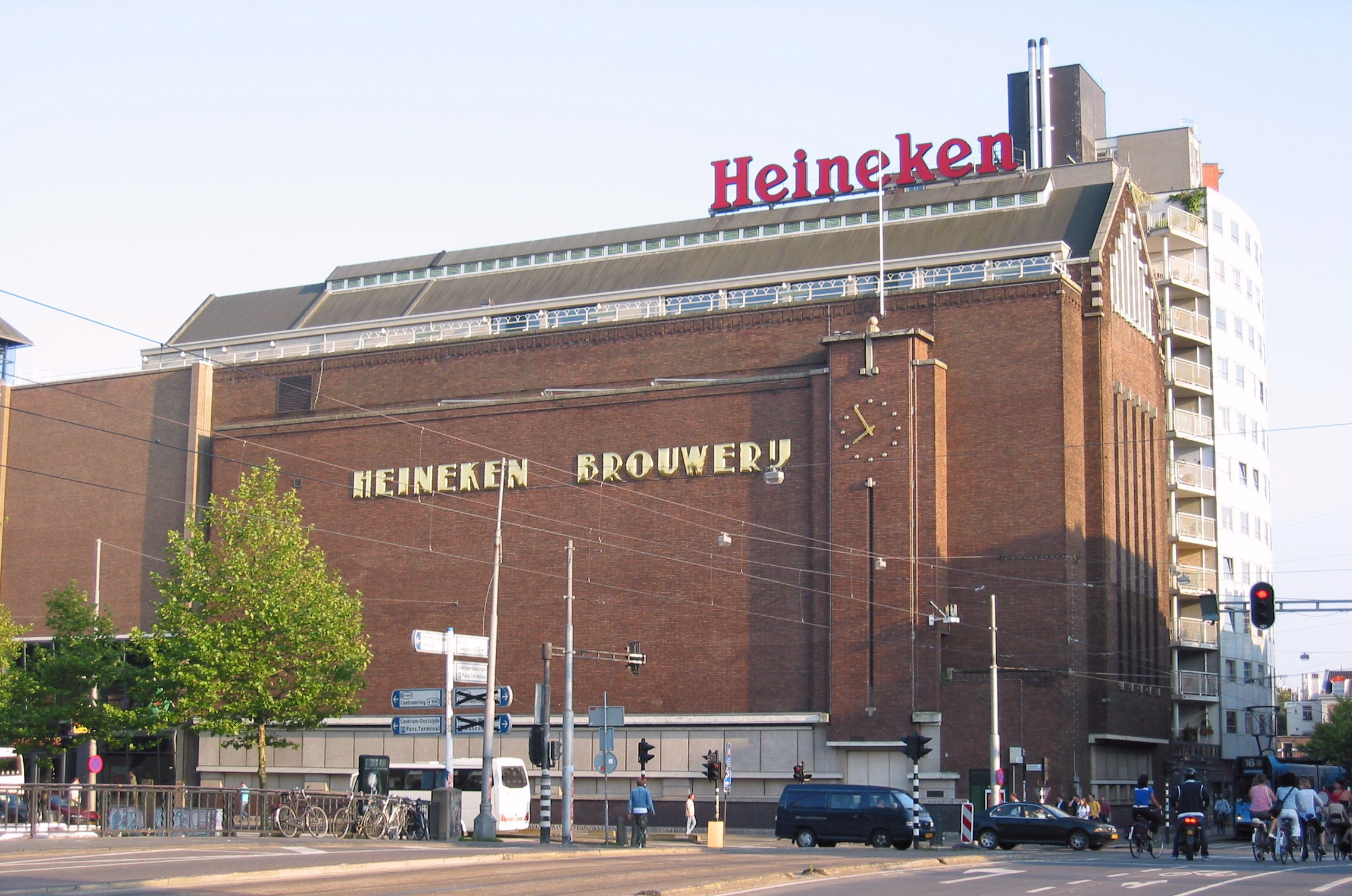
Exterior of the former Heineken brewery in Amsterdam on the Stadhouderskade and Ferdinand Bolstraat, built in 1867 and in use as a brewery until 1988. Now the museum Heineken Experience

With an annual beer production of 24.14 billion litres in 2019, and global revenues of €23.894 billion in 2019, Heineken N.V. is the number one brewer in Europe and one of the largest brewers by volume in the world. Heineken's Dutch breweries are located in Zoeterwoude, 's-Hertogenbosch, and Wijlre. The original brewery in Amsterdam, closed in 1988, is preserved as a museum called the Heineken Experience.

Since the merger between the two largest brewing empires in the world, Anheuser-Busch InBev and SABMiller, in October 2016, Heineken has been the second-largest brewer in the world.

== History ==
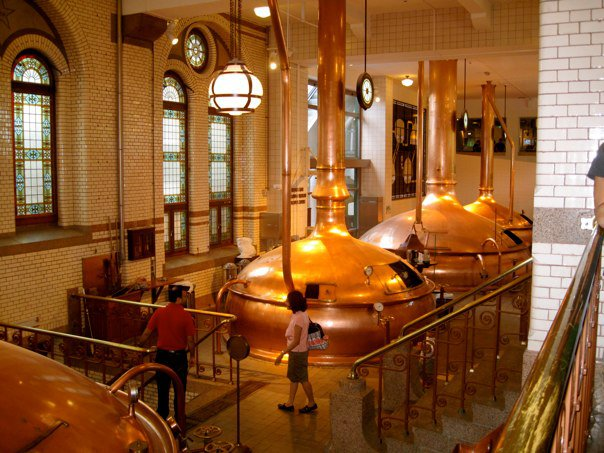
Interior of the former Heineken brewery in Amsterdam (now Heineken Experience)

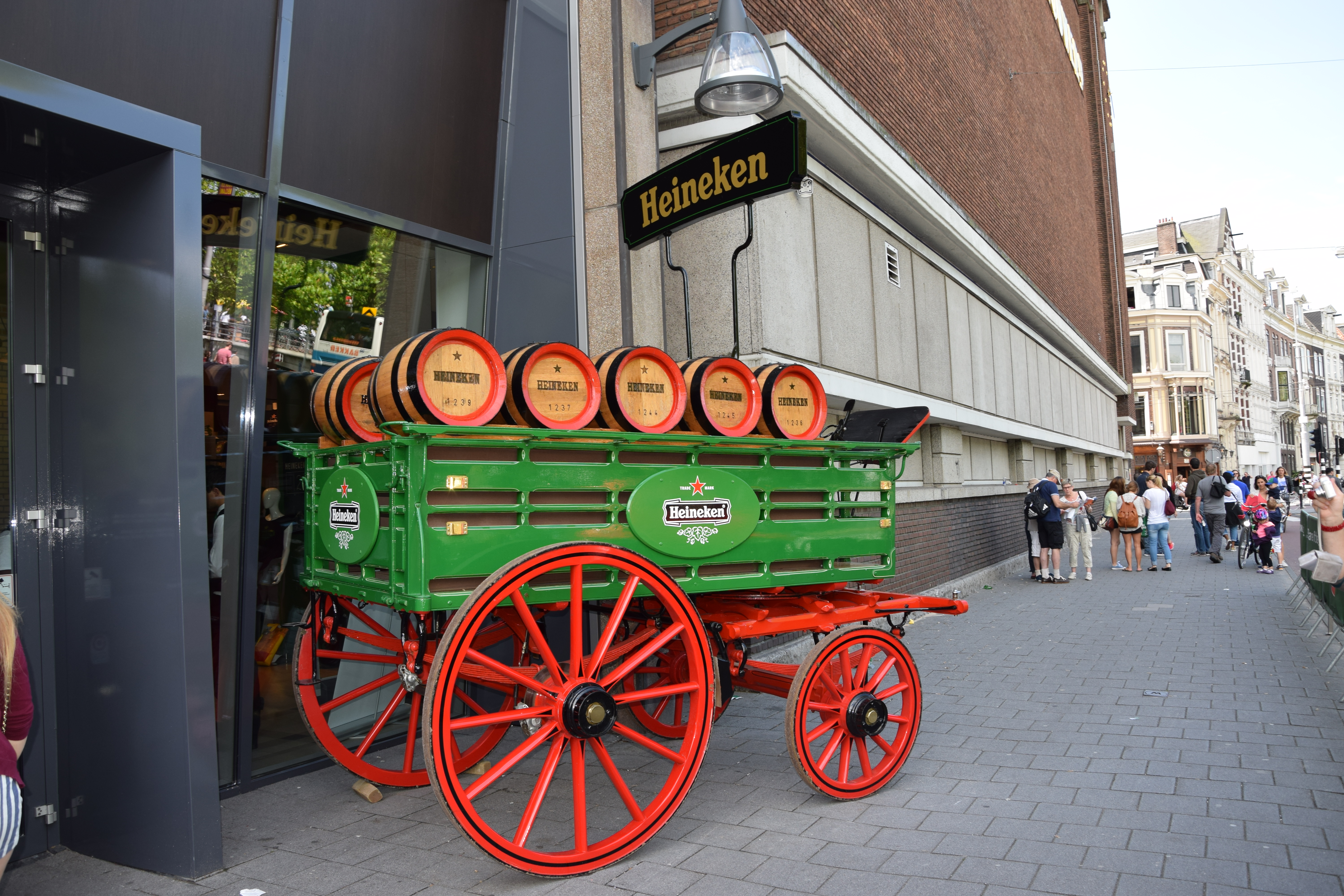
Exterior of the former Heineken brewery in Amsterdam (now Heineken Experience)

=== Gerard Adriaan Heineken ===
The Heineken company was founded in 1864 when the 22-year-old Gerard Adriaan Heineken bought a brewery known as De Hooiberg (the haystack) in Amsterdam. In 1868, the brewery is transferred from the Nieuwezijds Achterburgwal to the Stadhouderskade. In 1869, Heineken hired the experienced Bavarian brewer Wilhelm Feltmann, and switched to the use of bottom-fermenting yeast. In 1873 the brewery's name changed to Heineken's Bierbrouwerij Maatschappij (HBM), and opened a second brewery d’Oranjeboom (the Orange Tree) in Rotterdam in 1874. In 1886 Dr. H. Elion, a pupil of the French chemist Louis Pasteur, developed the "Heineken A-yeast" in the Heineken laboratory. This yeast is still the key ingredient of Heineken beer.

=== Henry Pierre Heineken ===
The founder's son, Henry Pierre Heineken, managed the company from 1917 to 1940, and continued involvement with the company until 1951. During his tenure, Heineken developed techniques to maintain consistent beer quality during large-scale production.

After World War I, the company focused more and more on exports. Three days after Prohibition ended in the United States, the first Heineken shipment landed in New York. From that day on, Heineken has remained one of the most successful imported beer brands in the United States.

=== Alfred Henry Heineken ===
On 1 June 1941, Henry Pierre's son, Alfred Henry "Freddy" Heineken, entered the service of the Heineken company, which by then was no longer owned by the family. Freddy bought back stock several years later, to ensure the family controlled the company again, and in 1971 was appointed chairman of the executive board. He was a powerful force behind Heineken's continued global expansion, and while he retired from the executive board in 1989, he maintained involvement with the company until his death in 2002.

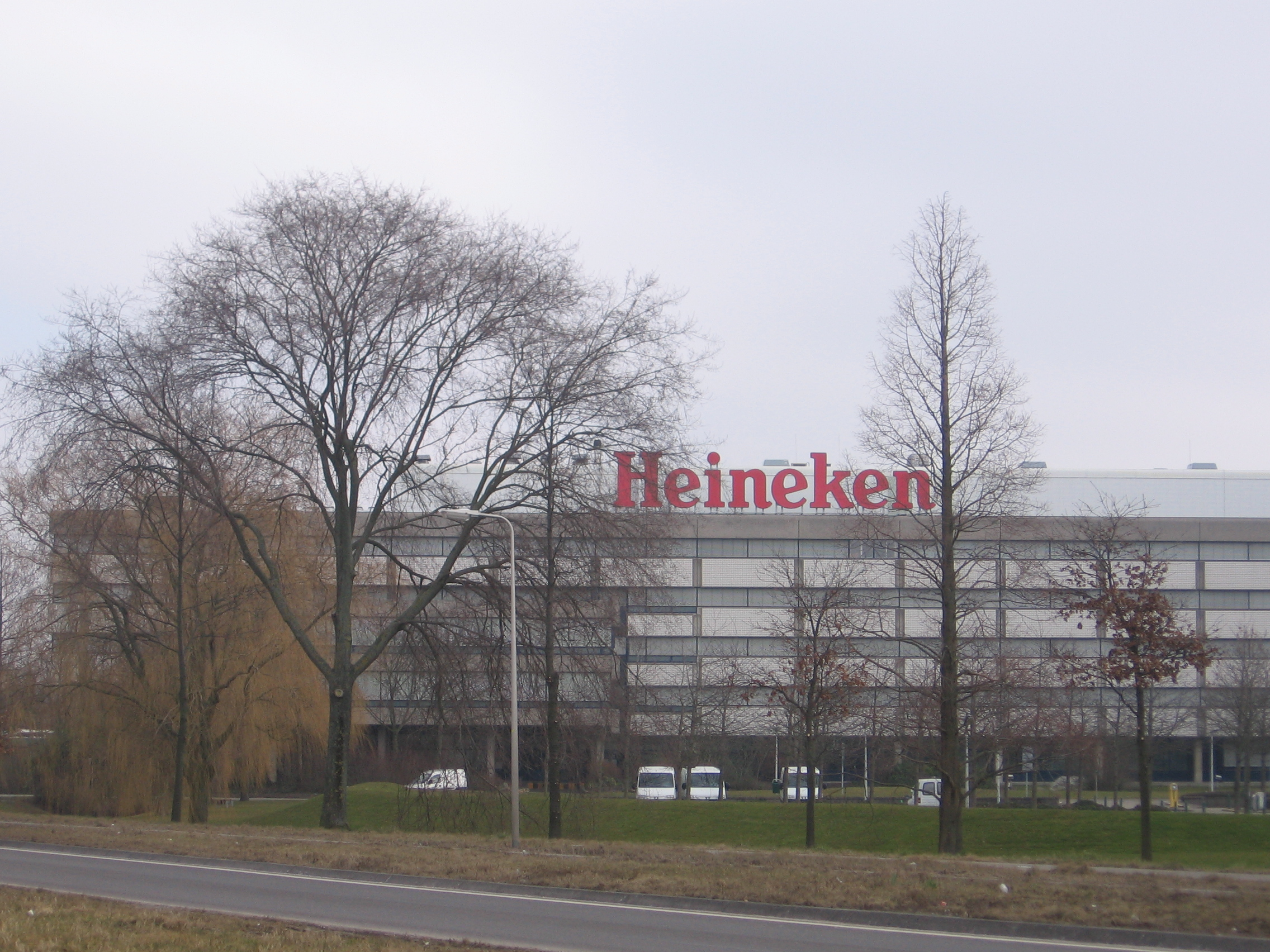
Heineken brewery in Zoeterwoude, Netherlands

During this period, Heineken tried to increase its stock price by purchasing competing breweries and closing them down. After World War II, many small breweries were bought or closed. In 1968 Heineken merged with its biggest competitor, Amstel, and in 1975 opened a new brewery in Zoeterwoude. The Amstel brewery was closed in 1980, and its production moved to Zoeterwoude and Den Bosch.

=== Recent history ===
Corporate logo used until 2011

Since mid-2007, Heineken has taken ownership of former S&N International brands such as Strongbow and Bulmers ciders, and John Smith's and Newcastle Brown Ale beers. With the part acquisition of Scottish and Newcastle in 2007/08, Heineken became the third-largest brewer based on revenues, behind the Belgian-Brazilian AB InBev and the British-South African SABMiller. Heineken owns the Czech brand Dačický, which was brewed in Kutná Hora from 1573 until Heineken took ownership of it and closed the brewery in 2009.

In October 2016, following the merger between Anheuser-Busch InBev and SABMiller, Heineken became the second largest brewer in the world.

On 12 January 2010, Heineken International successfully bought the brewery division of Mexican giant FEMSA in an all-stock deal, expanding its reach throughout Latin America. The deal brought brands such as Dos Equis, Sol, Tecate, Indio, Bohemia, and Kloster. Following the deal, Heineken started selling its products in Latin America through FEMSA's distribution network. The deal made FEMSA 20% owner of Heineken N.V. essentially becoming its largest single shareholder, after the Dutch Heineken and Hoyer families, who owns 25.83% and public shareholders owning 54.17%. The FEMSA acquisition is expected to keep Heineken in its strong position by growing its market share in the Latin American markets. FEMSA has a massive distribution network and owns Mexico's largest convenience store chain OXXO, which has thousands of locations throughout the country.

In September 2014, it was announced that Heineken would sell its Mexican packaging business Empaque to Crown for around €956M. Also during that month, Heineken revealed it was in talks to sell its Czech operations to Molson Coors.

On 10 September 2015, Heineken International announced it would acquire a 50% stake in Lagunitas Brewing Company of Petaluma in California as part of an effort to allow it (Lagunitas) to expand its operations globally. As part of the deal, Lagunitas would no longer be considered a craft brewer as the Heineken stake was greater than 25%.

In January 2017, Heineken announced it was in negotiations to buy the Kirin Company's 12 breweries in Brazil. The following month, Heineken closed the deal and bought Brasil Kirin for €664 million. (Note: The total consideration to be paid to Kirin for the shares was €664 million, corresponding to an estimated enterprise value of €1,025 million for Heineken)

On 4 May 2017, after previously acquiring 50% of Lagunitas Brewing Company, Heineken announced it would be purchasing the remaining 50% making it the sole owner of Lagunitas.

In 2018, Heineken signed an agreement with China Resources Enterprises to purchase a 40% stake into the company.

In June 2018, Heineken named Maggie Timoney as the CEO of Heineken USA, making her the first woman to become the CEO of a major United States beer supplier.

In June 2021, Heineken's stake in United Breweries of India increased to 61.5%, ultimately taking control of the company.

In April 2023, Heineken completed the acquisition of Distell and Namibia Breweries.

In May 2023, Heineken N.V. bought back €333M in shares from FEMSA. FEMSA would no longer hold any shares in Heineken N.V. and Heineken Holding N.V. other than the Heineken Holding N.V. shares underlying the exchangeable bond.

In August 2023, Heineken announced the sale of assets in Russia to the Arnest Group for €1 plus a €100M commitment to repay domestic debt.

In 2025, Heineken acquired a minority stake in the energy drink brand Tenzing, its first investment into the energy drink space.

In June 2026, the company announce that Rafael Oliveria would become its new chairman/CEO on October 1, 2026.

== Global structure ==
Heineken organises the company into five territories which are then divided into regional operations. The regions are: Western Europe, Central and Eastern Europe, The Americas, Asia Pacific and Africa and the Middle East. These territories contain 115 brewing plants in more than 65 countries, brewing local brands in addition to the Heineken brand.

=== Executive team ===
The executive team of the company consists of the following people:

- Harold van der Broek, Member Executive Board/CFO
- Yolanda Talamo, Chief People Officer
- Magne Setnes, Chief Supply Chain Officer
- Bram Westenbrink, Chief Commercial Officer
- Joanna Price, Chief Corporate Affairs Officer
- Romain Apert, Chief Digital & Technology Officer
- Alex Carreteiro, President Americas
- Jacco van der Linden, President Asia Pacific
- Guillaume Duverdier, President Africa, Middle East
- Glenn Caton, President Europe

=== Brewing plants ===
Heineken's brewing plants have been designed and engineered in 4 main parts of the world.

==== Europe ====
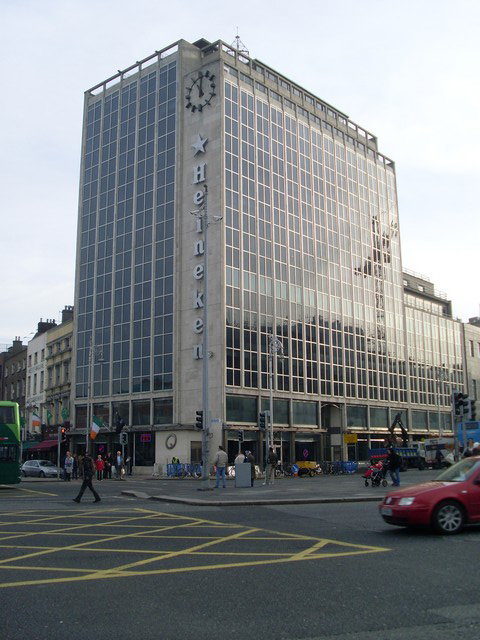
Heineken advertisement on the face of a prominent building on O'Connell Street, Dublin, Ireland

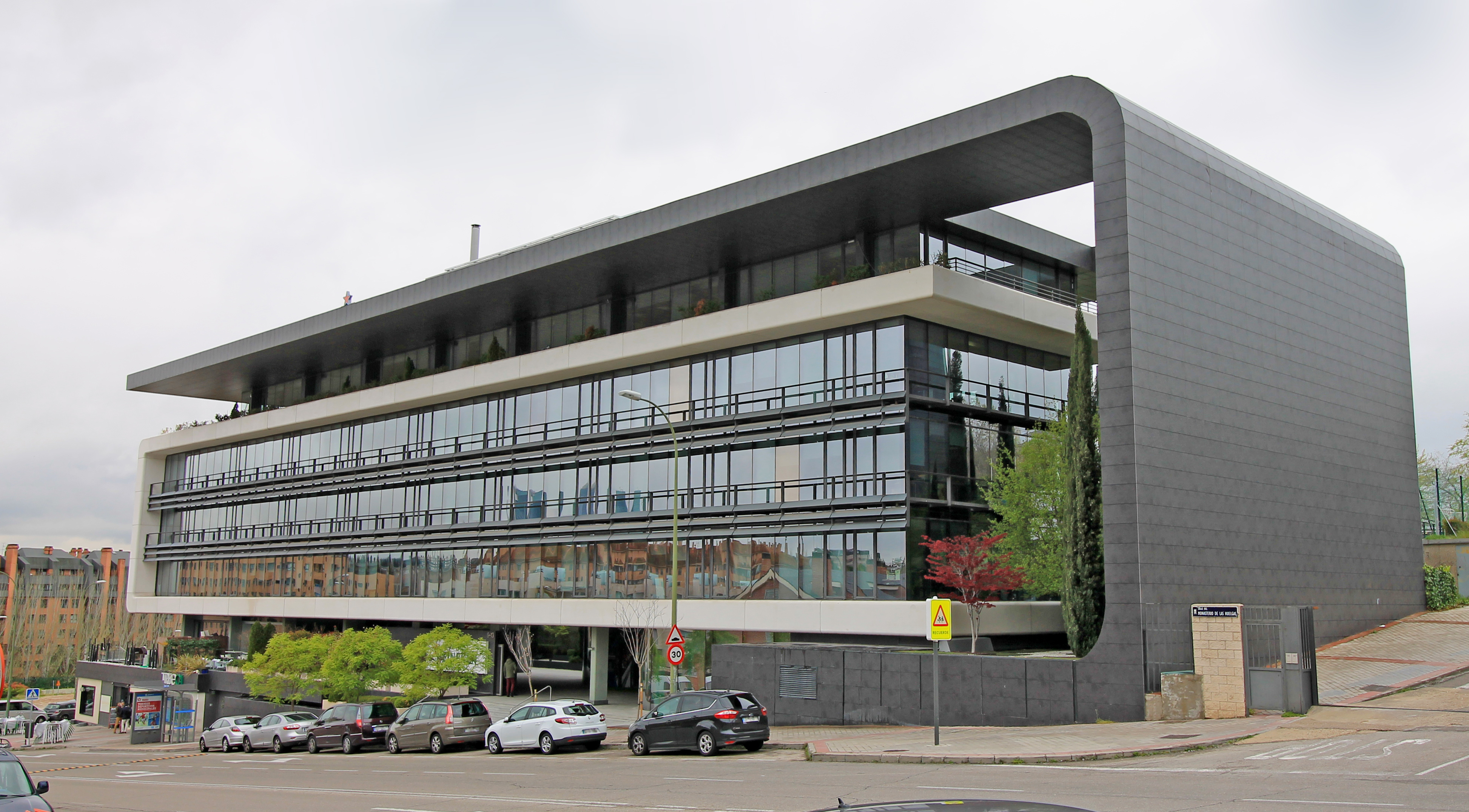
Heineken offices in Madrid, Spain

Heineken has 23 operating companies in Europe:

- Brau Union Österreich in Austria
- Alken-Maes in Belgium
- Zagorka Brewery in Bulgaria
- Karlovačka pivovara in Croatia
- Starobrno Brewery in the Czech Republic
- H. P. Bulmer in Hereford in England
- John Smith's in Tadcaster, England
- Royal Brewery in Manchester, England
- Heineken France:
  - Brasserie de l'Espérance in Schiltigheim
  - Brasserie Pelforth in Mons-en-Baroeul
  - Brasserie de la Valentine in Marseille
- Athenian Brewery in Greece
- Heineken Hungária in Hungary
- Heineken Ireland at Lady's Well Brewery in Cork, Ireland
- Heineken Italia in Italy
- Heineken Nederland in the Netherlands
- Żywiec Brewery in Poland
- Central de Cervejas in Portugal
- Heineken Romania in Romania
- Heineken Srbija in Serbia
- Heineken Slovensko in Slovakia
- Pivovarna Laško Union in Slovenia
- Heineken España in Spain, with breweries in Seville, Valencia, Jaén, and Madrid
- Heineken Switzerland in Switzerland
- Calanda Bräu in Switzerland

==== The Americas ====
Heineken has 9 operating companies in the Americas:

- Commonwealth Brewery in the Bahamas
- Heineken Brasil in Brazil
- Brasserie Nationale d'Haiti in Haiti
- Desnoes & Geddes in Jamaica
- Cuauhtémoc Moctezuma Brewery in Mexico
- Cervecerías Barú-Panama, S.A. in Panama
- Windward & Leeward Brewery in Saint Lucia
- Surinaamse Brouwerij in Suriname
- Lagunitas Brewing Company in the United States

==== Asia Pacific ====
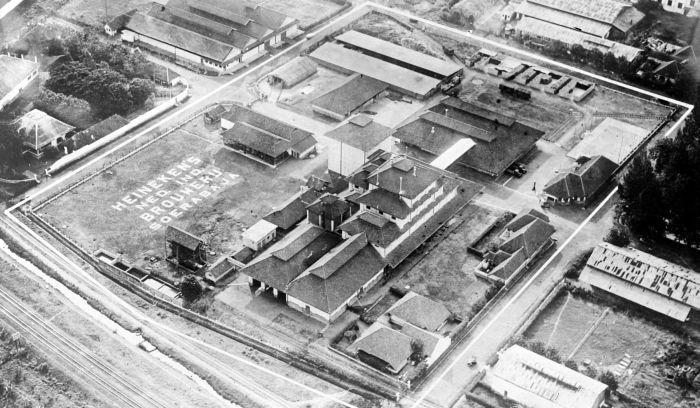
Heineken Brewery in Surabaya, Indonesia (at the time under colonial occupation as the so-called Dutch East Indies)

Heineken has 15 operating companies in Asia Pacific:

- Cambodia Brewery Ltd (CBL) in Cambodia
- Shanghai Mila Brewery in China
- Hainan Asia Pacific Brewery Company Ltd in China
- Guangzhou Asia Pacific Brewery in China (under construction)
- United Breweries Ltd in Banglore, India
- Multi Bintang Indonesia in Indonesia
- Heineken Lao Brewery in Laos
- Heineken Malaysia in Malaysia
- DB Breweries in New Zealand
- South Pacific Brewery Ltd (SPB) in Papua New Guinea
- Heineken Asia Pacific in Singapore
- Heineken Lanka (APB Lanka) in Sri Lanka
- Thai Asia Pacific Brewery in Thailand
- Heineken Vietnam Brewery Co Ltd in Vietnam
- Heineken Hanoi Brewery Co Ltd in Vietnam

==== Africa and the Middle East ====
Heineken has 18 operating companies in Africa and the Middle East. These include:

- Al Ahram Beverages Company, Egypt
- Amstel Jordan Brewery, Jordan
- Harar Brewery, Ethiopia
- Bedele Brewery, Ethiopia
- Bralirwa Brewery, Rwanda
- Brarudi Brewery, Burundi
- Brasserie Almaza, Lebanon
- Brasseries de Bourbon, Réunion
- Brasseries du Maroc, Morocco
- Bralima Brewery, Democratic Republic of the Congo
- Consolidated Breweries, Nigeria
- Heineken Kilinto Brewery, Ethiopia
- Distel, South Africa
- Groupe Castel Algérie, Algeria
- Namibia Breweries, Namibia
- Nigerian Breweries, Nigeria
- Société nouvelles des Brasseries SONOBRA, Tunisia
- Sierra Leone Brewery Limited, Sierra Leone
- Sedibeng Brewery, South Africa
- Tango Brewery, Algeria

=== Beer brands ===
Heineken International owns a worldwide portfolio of over 170 beer brands, mainly pale lager, though some other beer styles are produced. The two largest international brands are Heineken and Amstel; though the portfolio includes Birra Moretti, Edelweiss, Lagunitas, Sol, Desperados, and Tiger. Other regional brands include Affligem, Gösser and Sagres in Europe, Dos Equis, Red Stripe and Tecate in Americas, Bintang, Kingfisher and South Pacific Export in Asia-Pacific.

== Ownership ==
The shares of Heineken N.V are traded on the NYSE Euronext Amsterdam and OTCQX under the symbols: HEIA and HEINY respectively. As at May 2023, the shareholding in the group's stock was as depicted in the table below:

Heineken N.V stock ownership
| Rank | Name of Owner | % Ownership |
|---|---|---|
| 1 | Heineken Holding N.V^{1} | 50.5 |
| 2 | Others | 49.5 |
| | Total | 100.00 |

1. Heineken Holding N.V is a public company listed on the NYSE Euronext Amsterdam. Its single investment is Heineken N.V. It is majority owned by L’Arche Green N.V an investment vehicle of the Heineken family and the Hoyer family.

== Finances ==
The key trends of Heineken are (as at the financial year ending 31 December):

| Year | Revenue (€ mn) | Net income (€ mn) | Total assets (€ mn) |
|---|---|---|---|
| 2018 | 22,471 | 1,903 | 43,602 |
| 2019 | 23,969 | 2,166 | 47,508 |
| 2020 | 19,715 | −204 | 43,515 |
| 2021 | 22,137 | 3,324 | 49,821 |
| 2022 | 28,719 | 2,682 | 53,419 |
| 2023 | 30,362 | 2,304 | 56,387 |
| 2024 | 29,821 | 978 | 55,069 |

Sales in 2024 by geographic area:

| Region | Revenue (€ bn) | share |
|---|---|---|
| Europe | 11.79 | 38.7% |
| Americas | 10.43 | 34.2% |
| Asia Pacific | 4.23 | 13.9% |
| Africa and Middle East | 4.03 | 13.2% |
| Total | 29.82 | 100% |

== Marketing ==
=== Advertising ===
Heineken's main advertising slogan in the UK was "Refreshes the parts other beers cannot reach", some of which featured voice-over narration by Danish comedian/pianist Victor Borge. The British TV campaign ran for over 30 years – stopping in 2005. From March 2011 they have been advertising using the song 'The Golden Age' by The Asteroids Galaxy Tour. After the success of The Entrance, a web advert (4M views in YouTube), Heineken launched The Date in May 2011.

In March 2017 in Amsterdam, Heineken opened a pop-up bakery for five days to promote the yeast used in its brewing. The bread was made by Mark Plaating, and proceeds were donated to a local baking guild.

=== Sponsorships ===
==== Sports ====
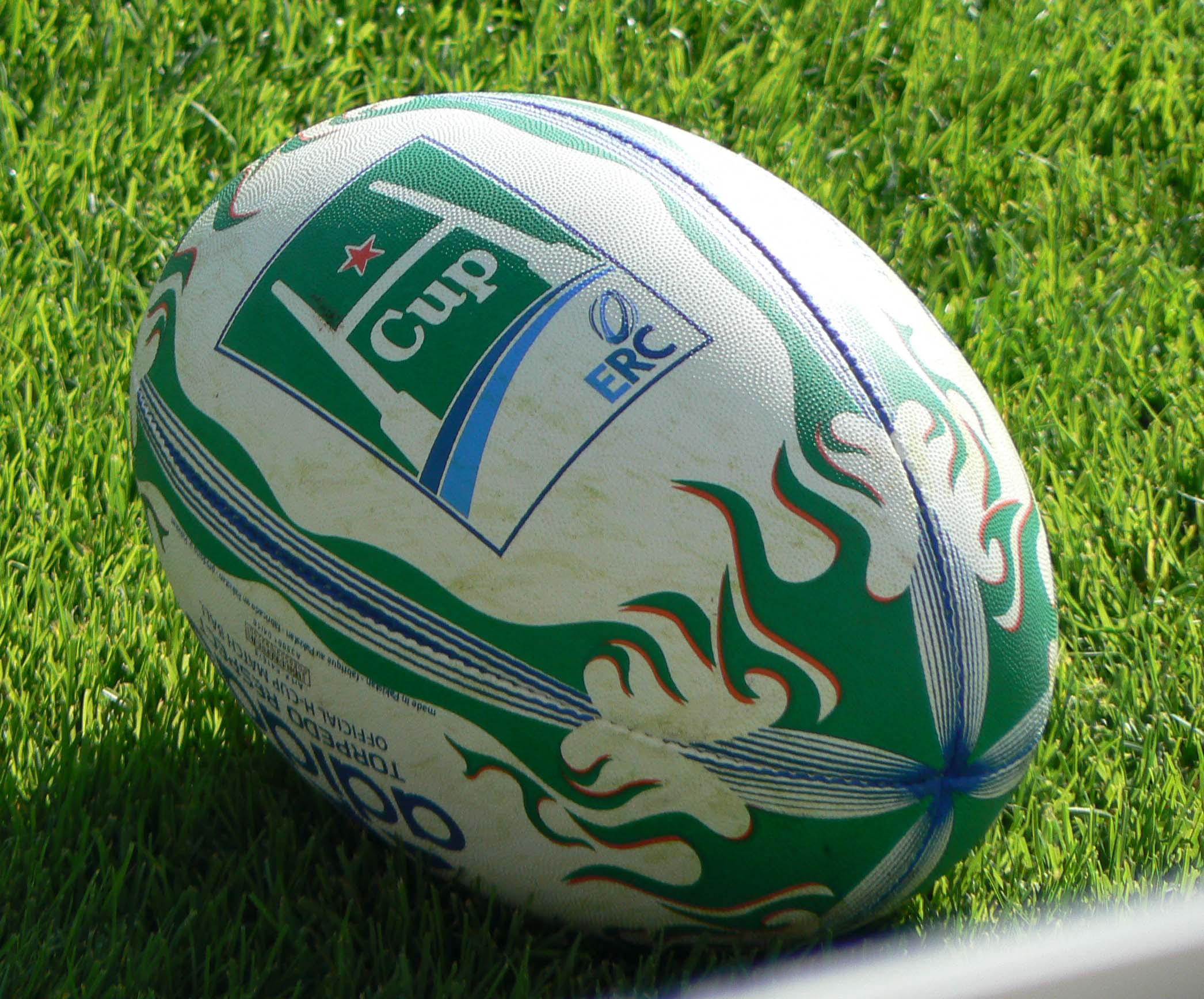
Rugby ball used in the Heineken Cup

Heineken sponsors several sporting events. The Heineken Cup was an annual rugby union knock-out competition involving leading club, regional and provincial teams from the Six Nations: England, France, Scotland, Wales, Ireland, and Italy. Heineken was the title sponsor from the cup's inaugural tournament in 1995–96, until the tournament ceased in 2014 and was replaced by the European Rugby Champions Cup. Heineken continued its sponsorship of European Club Rugby as the principle partner of the European Rugby Champions Cup returning to title sponsorship of the Champions Cup from 2018–19. They have been credited as the Founding Partner of European Rugby.

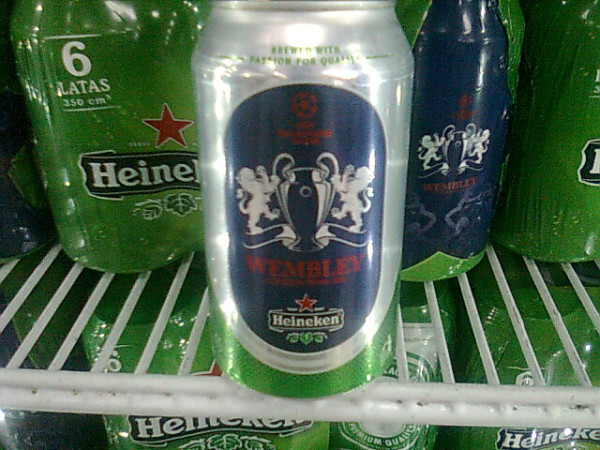
A can of Heineken with a logo of the 2011 UEFA Champions League Final

Heineken has been an integral partner of the UEFA Champions League since 2005, with a theme of "Enjoyed together around the world."

The Heineken Open (tennis) is a tennis tournament on the ATP International Series played in Auckland, New Zealand.

In 2016, Heineken became the Official Beer of the Formula One World Championship after the Canadian Grand Prix.

During the knockout stage of the 2019–20 season, Heineken 0,0% became the official beer of the UEFA Europa League as the season resumed followed with the start of the 2020–21 season.

==== Music ====
Heineken also sponsors the music events: the Heineken Open'er Festival, a contemporary music festival held in Poland; and, since 2004, the Oxegen music festival in Ireland. Heineken sponsors the Ballyheigue Summerfest in County Kerry, Ireland.

=== Holland Heineken House ===
Since 1992 Heineken organises, together with NOC*NSF, the Dutch meeting place at all the Olympic Games for TeamNL, called the Holland Heineken House.

=== Heineken Experience ===
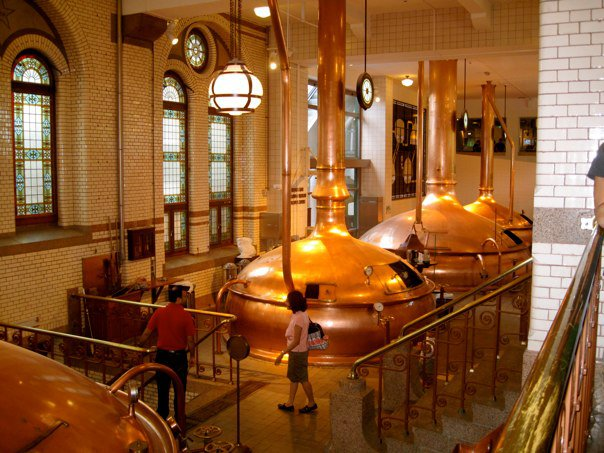
Inside the Heineken Experience

The Heineken Experience is a museum about Heineken Pilsener and the Heineken brewery, based in the original brewery in Amsterdam. The original building was built in 1867, and was in use as a brewery until 1988. In 1991, when part of the establishment was torn down, the Heineken Reception and Information Centre (Dutch: Heineken ontvangst- en informatiecentrum) was opened in the remaining building. In 2001 the name was changed to Heineken Experience.

The museum features "rides", interactive exhibits, and two bars. It also gives an insight into the company's history and brewing processes through the years. Visitors receive one small tasting glass and two full-sized glasses of Heineken beer to drink at the end of the tour, both paid for by the €21 entry fee.

== Controversies ==
=== Possible ties to the slave plantations ===
On 15 February 1864, Gerard Adriaan Heineken bought De Hooiberg (the Haystack) brewery in Amsterdam. It remains unclear whether the funds for the purchase of the Haystack came from his father, a cheese trader, or his mother, whose estate included proceeds from her previous husband's family's historical investments in West Indies slave plantations.

In a letter to his mother 18 June 1863, Gerard discussed the potential Haystack purchase and his plans for the future. Gerard's mother, Anna Geertruida van de Paauw, came to own shares in slave plantations in Berbice (modern day Guyana) and Suriname through her first marriage in 1829 to Pieter Jacob Schumacher van Oudorp (1804–1833) who died in 1833. The Schumacher family owned several plantations in Berbice and Suriname, according to records held at the UK's National Archive. After Pieter Schumacher died, Anna was remarried to Cornelis Heineken and had four children, one of which was Gerard Heineken. Anna died in 1881.

=== Price fixing and competition violations ===
Heineken has, over a sustained period, been subject to investigations, fines and litigation relating to anti-competitive conduct, including cartel behaviour, abuse of dominance and restrictive supply practices, both at a group level and through its subsidiaries.

At the EU level, one of the most significant enforcement actions in recent times arose from a Dutch beer cartel. On 18 April 2007 the European Commission fined Heineken €219.3m, Grolsch €31.65m and Bavaria €22.85m for operating a price fixing cartel in the Netherlands, totalling €273.7m. InBev, (formerly Interbrew), escaped without a penalty because it provided "decisive information" about the cartel which operated between 1996 and 1999 and others in the EU market. The brewers controlled 95% of the Dutch market, with Heineken claiming a half and the three others 15% each.

Neelie Kroes, the EU Commissioner, said she was "very disappointed" that the collusion took place at the very highest (boardroom) level. She added, Heineken, Grolsch, Bavaria and InBev tried to cover their tracks by using code names and abbreviations for secret meetings to carve up the market for beer sold to supermarkets, hotels, restaurants and cafes. The price fixing extended to cheaper own-brand labels and rebates for bars.

Heineken has also faced fines or sanctions in other EU markets. In France, the company was fined in 2004 alongside Kronenbourg (then part of Scottish and Newcastle), for anti-competitive conduct. In Austria another Heineken subsidiary, Brau Union, was found by the competition authority to have restricted "sales opportunities" to "oust existing drinks retailers from the market". According to the publication Brauwelt, Heineken could ultimately be fined up to 10% of its global turnover, which is over €30 billion.

In 2020, Star Pubs & Bars, a business owned by Heineken UK, was fined £2 million by the Pubs Code Adjudicator for repeated breaches of its Pubs Code where it reportedly forced its pub tenants to sell unreasonable levels of Heineken’s beer brands.

In Greece, Athenian Brewery, a subsidiary of Heineken, was also found to have abused its dominant market position by the Hellenic Competition Authority. Athenian Brewery was fined €31.5M for anti-competitive behaviour in the market between 1998 and 2014.

In response, two other beer companies (Carlsberg and Macedonian Thrace Brewery) brought follow-on damages claims in the Netherlands against Heineken for €300M and €180M respectively. The Dutch and European courts have established that Heineken is liable and that it will have to pay a minimum of €83M in damages to MTB. A final ruling is expected in 2026, according to reports.

=== Fake craft beers ===
In Ireland, Heineken briefly marketed "Blasket Blonde" in County Kerry from March 2015 to September 2016, and Beanntraí Bru in parts of County Cork in August 2016, as locally made craft beers, from invented breweries.

=== Investments in Russia ===
At the end of March 2022, over a month after Russia started its war in Ukraine, Heineken announced that it was leaving Russia (including with its other brands there, like Affligem, Amstel etc.), saying that ownership of the Russian subsidiary was no longer "durable or viable." But despite this promise Heineken hired more than 240 new staff and launched 61 new products on the Russian market in the last year, investigators from Follow the Money reported, based on an overview of 2022 by Heineken Russia.

The Dutch brewer's Russian subsidiary looked back on "a turbulent year, with many new growth opportunities." One of these opportunities being the departure of Coca-Cola and Pepsi from Russia, which Heineken "cynically" used to "enter the non-alcoholic carbonated beverage market". Heineken announced more investments for 2023, including more modern packaging and new flavours. New products launched in Russia included an Irish stout, replacing Guinness (which had been brewed and sold by Heineken, under licence), after Diageo withdrew from Russia.

In August 2023, Heineken announced the sale of its Russian subsidiary to the Arnest Group for €1 plus a €100 million commitment to repay domestic debt.

=== Iran operations (2018–2025) ===
In April 2018, Heineken quietly acquired a 51% majority stake in Castle Noush, an Iranian non-alcoholic malt beverage producer and subsidiary of the Solico Group, Iran's largest food conglomerate. The investment was not disclosed in any press release or annual report. Heineken revealed it only in a little-known annex to financial statements filed in the Netherlands. Negotiations for the joint venture were led by Mohammad Mohaghegh Damad, a senior adviser to Solico Group's chairman and nephew of Ali Larijani, the Islamic Republic's parliamentary speaker and one of Iran's most senior political figures at the time. Mohaghegh describes his role on LinkedIn as leading "a joint venture agreement from inception to completion between a high-profile multinational beverage company and Solico." Meetings between Heineken representatives and Mohaghegh took place in Vienna, with WhatsApp messages confirming his central role in the negotiations.

Iran experts have stated that it is virtually impossible for a company of Solico Group's stature not to have ties to the Islamic Revolutionary Guard Corps (IRGC), listed as a terrorist organisation by the United States and the European Union. Analysts have also noted that investing in Iranian food production without a pre-approved licence from the US could be in violation of US sanctions. By 2020 Heineken had returned its majority stake in Castle Noush to Solico Group. In September 2025 the company completed a full withdrawal from Iran, selling its remaining stake reportedly at a loss. When contacted by Der Standard with a detailed list of questions regarding the Larijani connection, Heineken did not respond. A company spokesperson confirmed only that the sale of its stake in Castle Noush had been completed.
