= See a man about a dog =

Idiom

To see a man about a dog or horse is an idiom, especially British English, of apology for one's imminent departure or absence, generally to euphemistically conceal one's true purpose, such as going to use the toilet or going to buy an alcoholic drink. The original non-facetious meaning was probably to place or settle a bet on a race, perhaps accompanied by a wink.

In the United Kingdom, its modern usage is a polite way of a person saying that they are going away, or have returned from somewhere, but do not want to be asked where, often with the facetious implication that they are up to no good.

In the Southern United States, going to see a man about a dog signifies that one is going to urinate, while going to see a man about a horse signifies that one is going to defecate, and thus may be away a bit longer.

== Historical usage ==
The earliest confirmed publication is the 1866 Dion Boucicault play Flying Scud, in which a character knowingly breezes past a difficult situation saying, "Excuse me Mr. Quail, I can't stop; I've got to see a man about a dog." Time magazine observed that the phrase was the play's "claim to fame". In Newcastle upon Tyne, Newcastle Brown Ale commonly gained the nickname of "Dog" from the frequent use of the phrase to describe going to the pub.

During Prohibition in the United States, the phrase was most commonly used in relation to the consumption or purchase of alcoholic beverages.

The phrase entered into American usage when Cary Grant used it to escape an awkward social situation in the 1938 film Bringing Up Baby, an iconic screwball comedy.
