= Reeb (beer) =

Chinese brand of beer

Reeb (Chinese: 力波; pinyin: Lìbō) is a Chinese brand of beer produced in by the Shanghai Asia Pacific Brewery. Reeb is beer spelled backwards. Reeb's distribution is primarily in the Shanghai area.

It has been described as the "most popular beer in Shanghai."
