= Amstel Brewery =

Dutch brewery

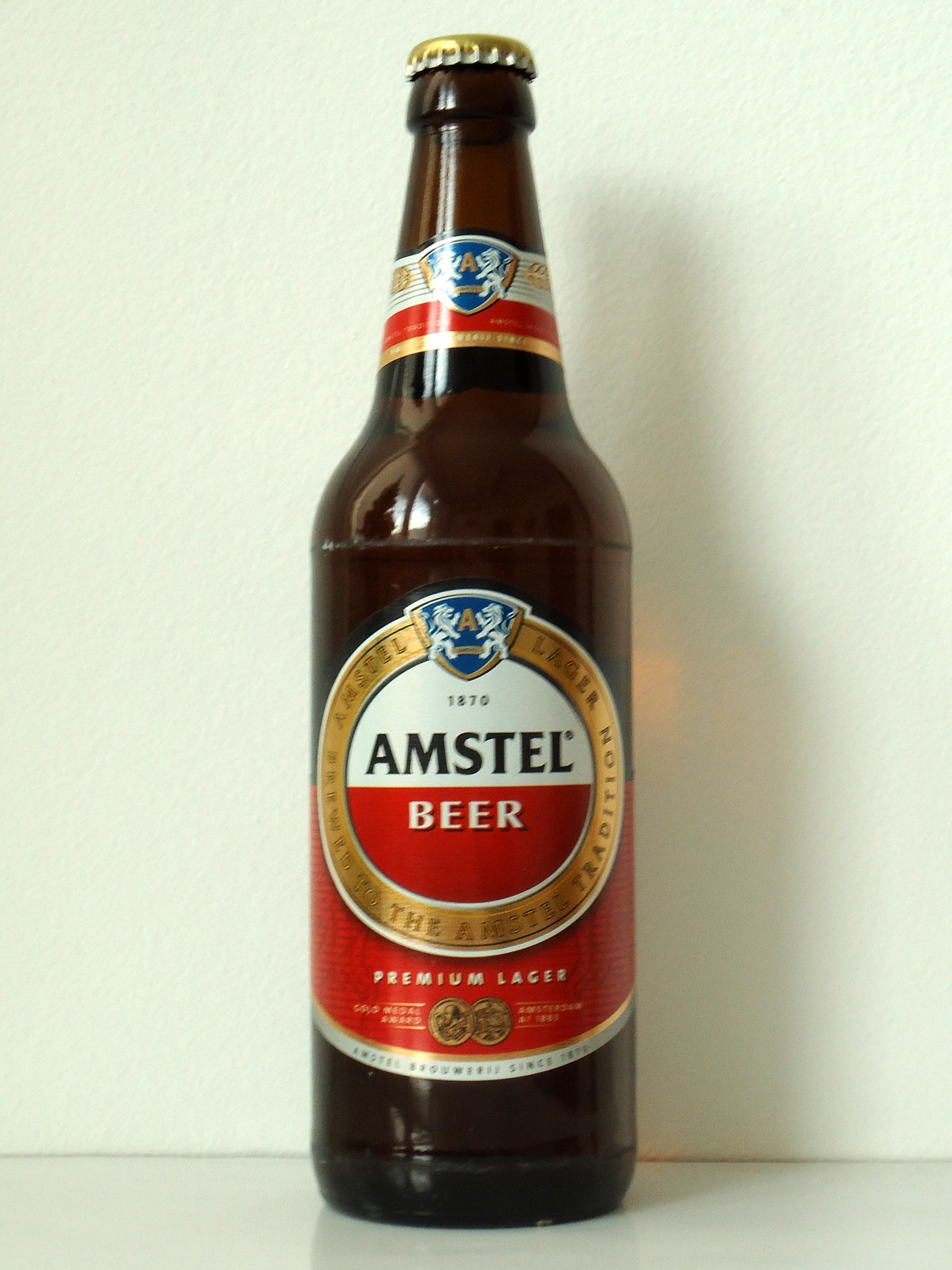
- Amstel Premium Lager
- Industry: Brewing
- Founded: 1870; 156 years ago
- Headquarters: Zoeterwoude, South Holland, Netherlands
- Area served: Worldwide
- Products: Beer
- Production output: 36 million litres
- Owner: Heineken N.V.
- Website: amstel.com

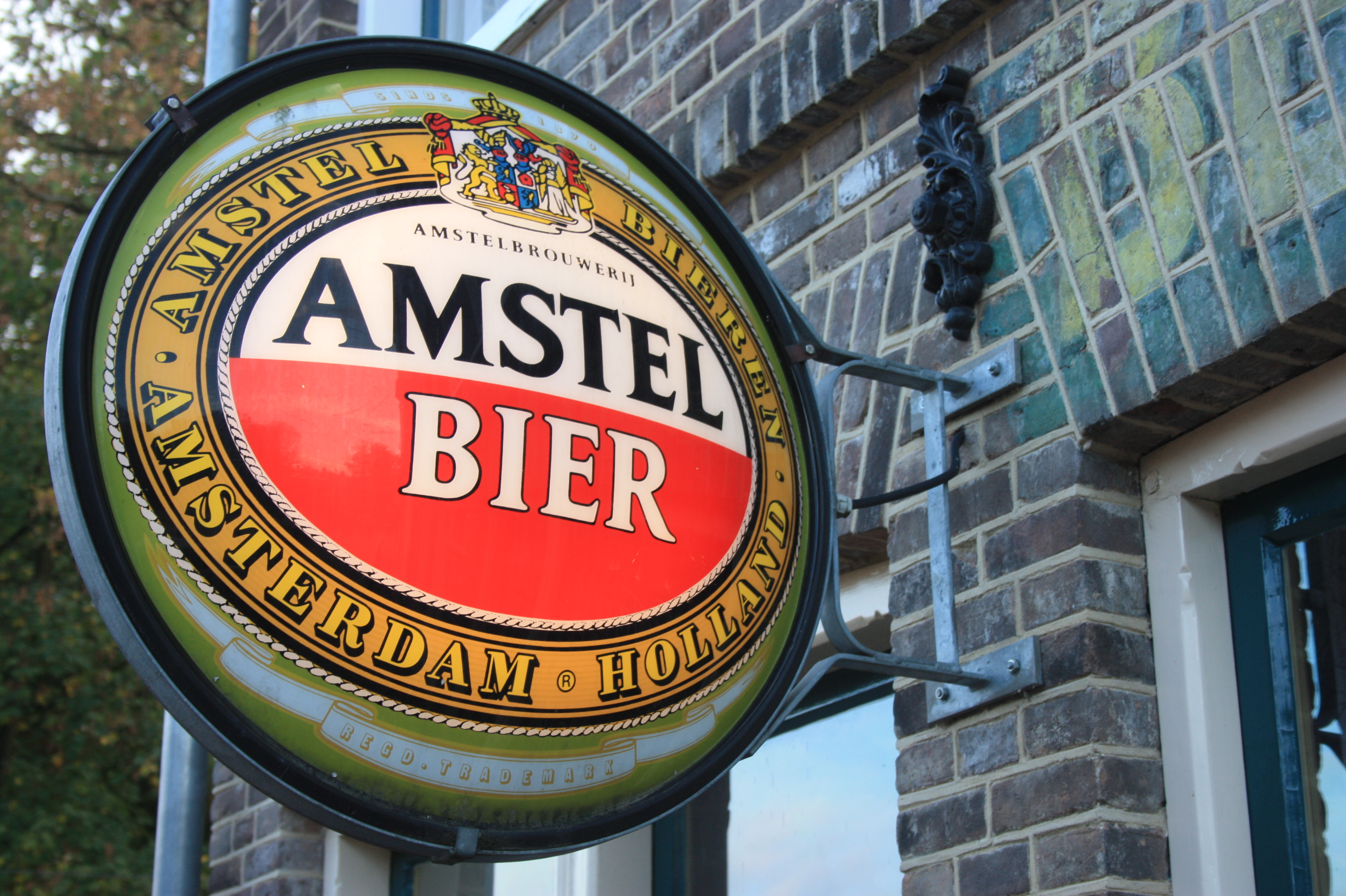
Amstel Bier sign, Netherlands Open Air Museum, Arnhem

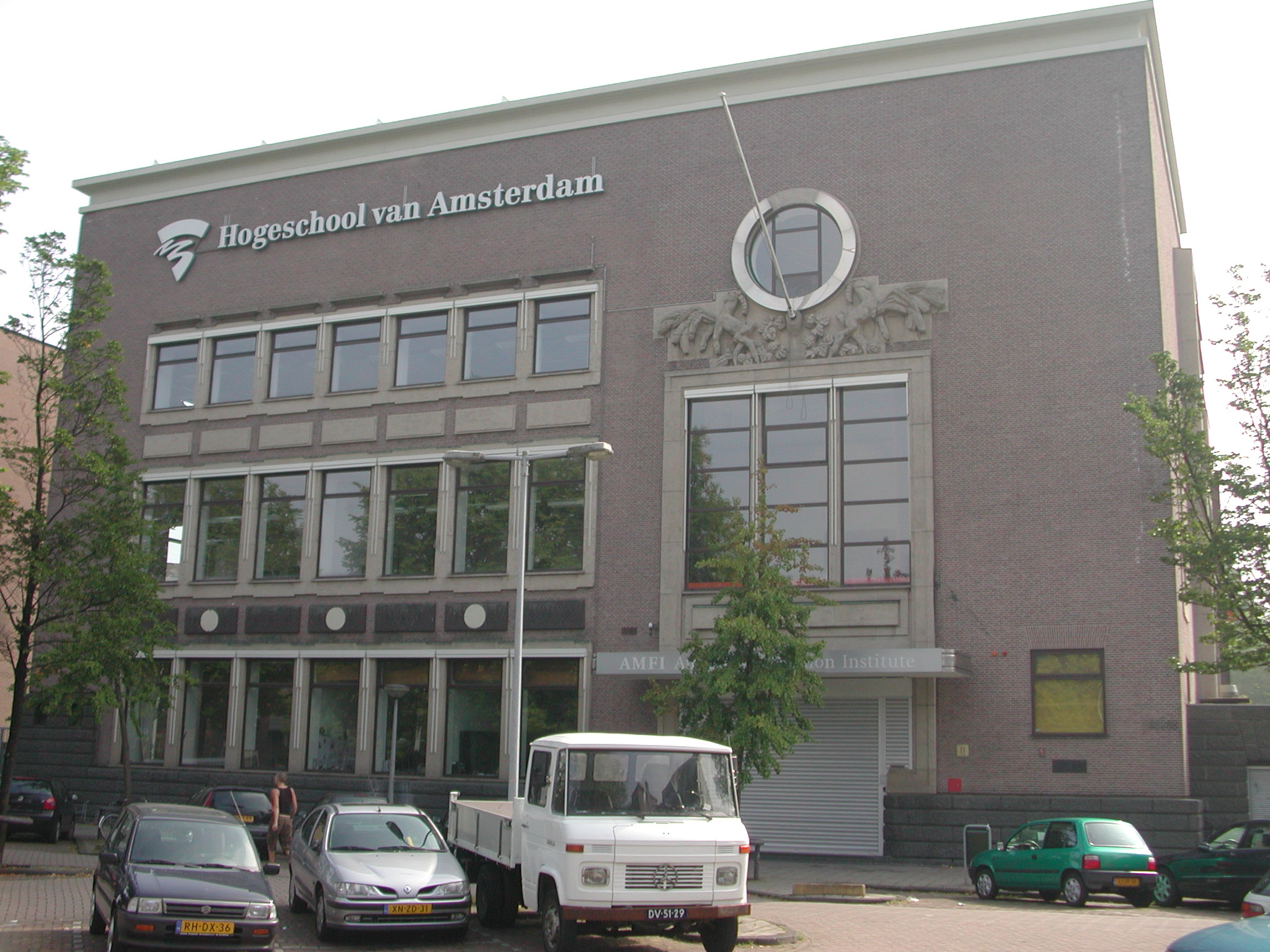
Former Amstel Brewery in the Netherlands, now a school

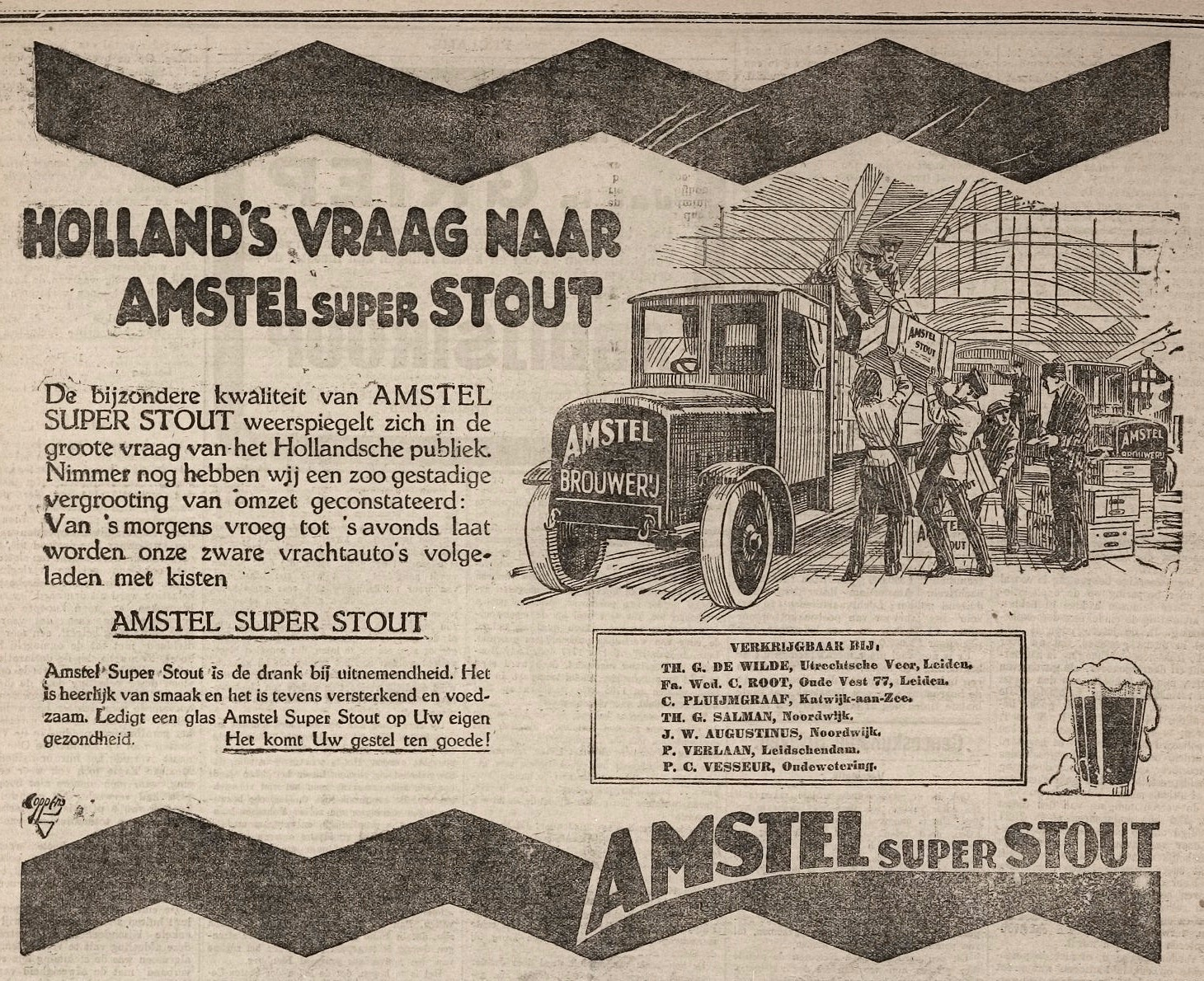
An advertisement for "Amstel super Stout" from 1922

Amstel Brewery (Dutch: Amstelbrouwerij [ˈɑmstəlbrʌuəˌrɛi]) is a Dutch brewery founded in 1870 on the Mauritskade in Amsterdam. It was taken over by Heineken N.V. in 1968, and the brewing plant closed down in 1982, with production moving to the main Heineken plant at Zoeterwoude, South Holland.

== History ==
The brewery was founded by Charles Antoine de Pesters (1842–1915), Johannes Hendrikus van Marwijk Kooy (1847–1916) and Willem Eduard Uhlenbroek (1839–1880). De Pesters and Van Marwijk Kooy were brothers-in-law, both coming from very affluent Amsterdam families. Uhlenbroek's father owned a small sugar refinery in Amsterdam. The brewery was named after the river Amstel in North Holland. The brewery's symbolic first stone was laid on 11 June 1870. The first brew was completed on 25 October 1871 and 2 1/2 months later, on 9 January 1872, the first beer was delivered to clients. The brewery was officially opened on 15 January 1872. At this time its annual brewing capacity was 10,000 hectoliters (220,000 imp gallons). For the purpose of storing the beer, winter ice from canals was kept in special double-walled cellars. Originally, Amstel beers were mostly drunk in Amsterdam. The expansion outside Amsterdam ran more or less parallel to the development of the Dutch railway network. Agents were appointed in towns along new railway lines. As from 1883, Amstel beers were also exported to Great Britain and the Dutch East Indies. In 1884 a special export bottling plant was built, where "tropical" beers for the Dutch East Indies and other overseas markets were pasteurised and packaged in metal kegs.

On 1 January 1891 the firm De Pesters, Kooy & Co. operating under the name Beiersch Bierbrouwerij De Amstel (Bavarian Beer Brewery De Amstel), was turned into a public limited company. In 1915 the production of Amstel had increased twenty-fold and in 1926, Amstel consisted of a third of the Dutch beer exports. In 1941, Amstel, together with Heineken N.V., bought up the Amsterdam brewery Van Vollenhoven's Bierbrouwerij, which was closed in 1961.

In 1954, Amstel built a brewery in Dutch Guiana. A few years later, Amstel was the first Dutch brewery to export beer in cans. At this time, the total exports of Amstel beer amounted to 101,000 hectoliters. In 1958 a subsidiary of Amstel produced its first beer in Jordan. In 1960, the third subsidiary of Amstel was opened in Curaçao. 1963 saw the opening of two new breweries, one in Puerto Rico and one in Greece.

Amstel was bought out by Heineken N.V. in 1968. In 1972 the Amstel Brewery in Amsterdam was closed and production was relocated to the main Heineken plant in Zoeterwoude, South Holland. The building on the Mauritskade was torn down. Only the former administration building was kept and has since become part of Amsterdam University of Applied Sciences.

At the end of the 20th century, in Spain, Heineken N.V. decided to replace the local centennial brand El Águila and convert it into Amstel.

== Beers ==
Heineken offers several beers under the Amstel brand. Amstel Lager uses predominantly light pilsner malt, although some dark malt is also used. It is sold in 75 countries. Amstel Light is a 3.5% Alcohol by Volume (ABV) pale lager sold in the US and the Netherlands, a 2.5% ABV variant sold in New Zealand.

In the United Kingdom Amstel Bier is 3.4% ABV, reduced from 4.1% in 2025, and 4.0% ABV in Mexico. Amstel 1870 is a slightly dark 5% ABV lager. In France a beer called Amstel Free, with minimal alcohol content –about one per cent ABV– is produced. A non-alcoholic beer, Amstel Zero, can be purchased in the Netherlands, Greece, Egypt and few other countries. Amstel Ultra Light is a beer made by Heineken Mexico for the Mexican market.

Amstel also markets a shandy called Amstel Radler in several countries. It contains 2% alcohol and it is a mix of lager beer and lemonade.
