= Schooner (glass) =

Tableware

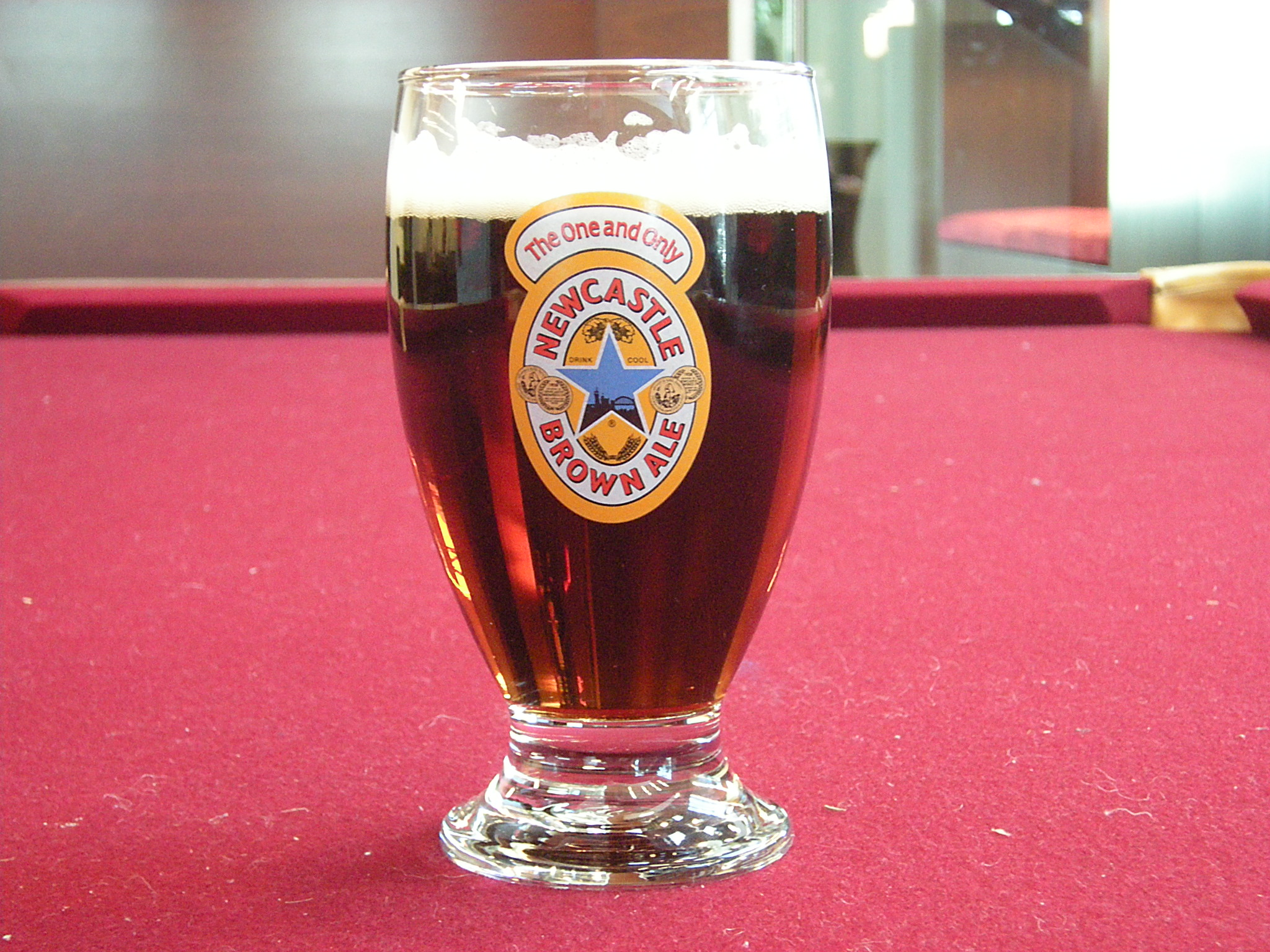
A "Geordie schooner" of Newcastle Brown Ale

A schooner is a type of glass or a fluid measure for serving alcoholic drinks, which varies by country.

== Australia ==
There is no legal definition of a schooner in Australia. In all parts of Australia other than South Australia, a schooner is usually a 425 ml (15 imp fl oz), or three-quarters of an imperial pint.

In South Australian pubs and clubs, a schooner is a glass with a capacity of 285 ml (10 imp fl oz), or half an imperial pint pre-metrication. This size of glass that is usually known as a "middy" or "pot", elsewhere in Australia.

== Canada ==
In Canada, a schooner is a large capacity beer glass. Unlike the Australian or British schooner, which is smaller than a pint, a Canadian schooner is larger. Although not standardised, the most common size of schooner served in Canadian bars is 33.3 Imp fl oz / 946 ml (32 US fl oz). It is commonly a tankard-shaped glass (dimpled mug shape with handle), rather than a traditional pint glass.

It should not be confused with Schooner Lager, which is a regional brand of beer found only in the eastern maritime provinces of Canada.

== United Kingdom ==
In Britain, a schooner is a large sherry glass. Sherry is traditionally served in one of two measures: a clipper, the smaller measure, or a schooner, the larger measure, both named after the sort of ships (clipper and schooner) that brought sherry over from Spain.

Since 2011, beer and cider have been permitted to be sold in 2/3 imperial pint (379 ml) glasses known by drinkers as "schooners", though these are not defined as such in UK legislation.

Newcastle Brown Ale is traditionally served in a 1/2 imperial pint (284 ml) glass called a schooner, or "Geordie schooner".

== United States ==
In most places in the United States, "schooner" refers to the shape of the glass (rounded with a short stem), rather than the capacity. It can range from 18 to 32 US fl oz (532–946 ml).

In the Pacific Northwest, "schooner" refers to a smaller-size pour, usually 8 to 12 US fl oz (240–350 ml).
