= Hop water =

Carbonated water beverage made with hops

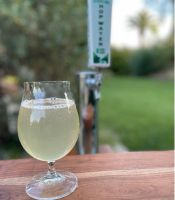
Hop water in a glass

Hop water is an American carbonated drink, mainly flavored with hops, a primary flavoring of beer.

Hop water was first sold by Californian homebrewer Paul Tecker, as H2OPS, in 2014. Production methods vary between makers, but they all involve adding hops, in oil form or in cones, to water and steeping them. The water is then carbonated, or carbonated water is added. Additional flavorings, including cannabis, are sometimes used. The drink is non-alcoholic, and generally low in calories.

Sales were $1.9 million in 2019 and $5.5 million or $13.6 million in 2022. As of 2022, there are more than a dozen brands, and Lagunitas Brewing Company is one of the producers.

The New York Times' writer said "...essentially LaCroix for beer fans. At its best, it’s crisp and refreshing, and it delivers a bit of what folks love about a good beer, without any of the alcohol-induced side effects." Men's Journal's writer said that while hop water doesn't taste like beer, it can "provide a refreshing beer-like experience." Taste of Home's writer said "Generally, I find that hop waters taste like a refreshing seltzer with a vibrant botanical edge and fresh notes of forest and citrus peel." One maker said "It's a placebo, like you are really stressed and there's an inclination to say you need a beer or you need to take a breath, but while a beer takes the edge off, it's still alcohol and can bog you down. Hop water, it tricks your brain into thinking you’re drinking a beer."

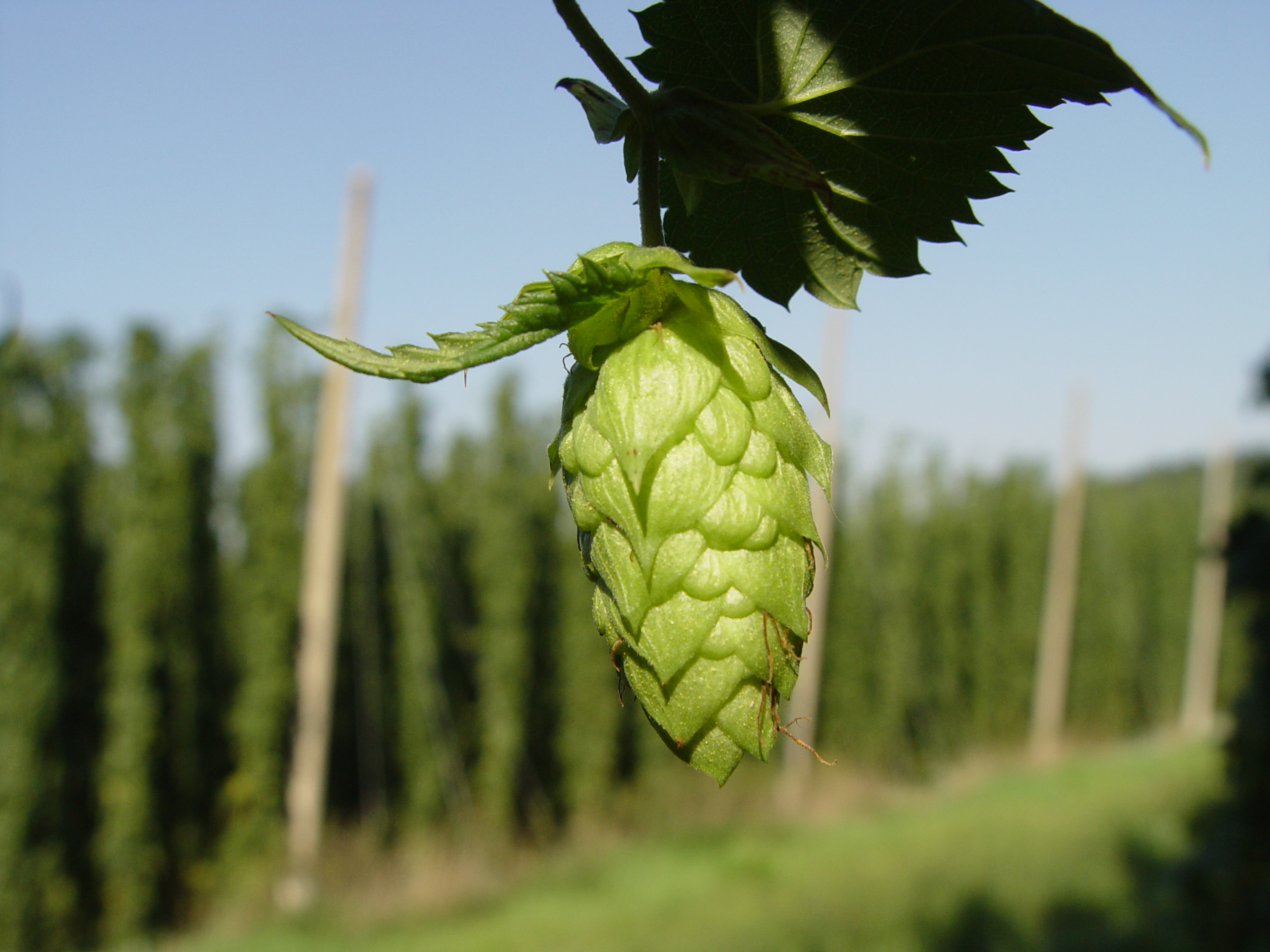
Hop flower or seed cone
