= Gerard Adriaan Heineken =

Dutch brewer and entrepreneur (1841–1893)

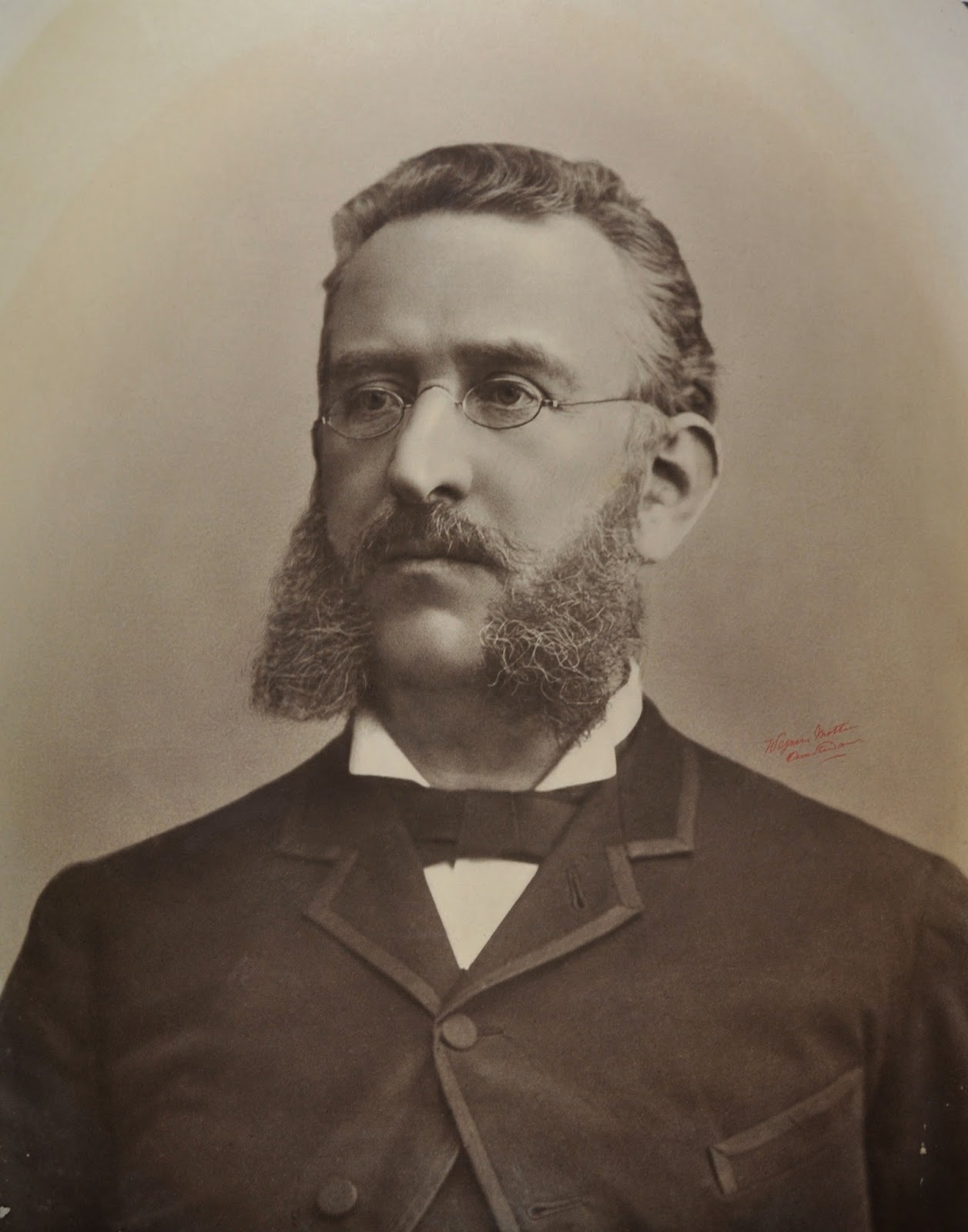
- Gerard Adriaan Heineken, c. 1870s
- Born: 28 September 1841; Amsterdam, Netherlands
- Died: 18 March 1893; Amsterdam, Netherlands
- Occupations: Brewer; business person
- Known for: Founding the brewery that became Heineken

Gerard Adriaan Heineken (Dutch pronunciation: [ˈɣerɑrt aːdrijaːn ˈɦɛinəkə(n)]; 28 September 1841 – 18 March 1893) was a Dutch brewer who acquired the Amsterdam brewery De Hooiberg in 1864 and developed it into the foundation of the company later known as Heineken.

== Early life ==
Heineken was born in Amsterdam to Cornelis Heineken and Anna Geertruida van der Paauw. He grew up in a merchant household.

== Career ==
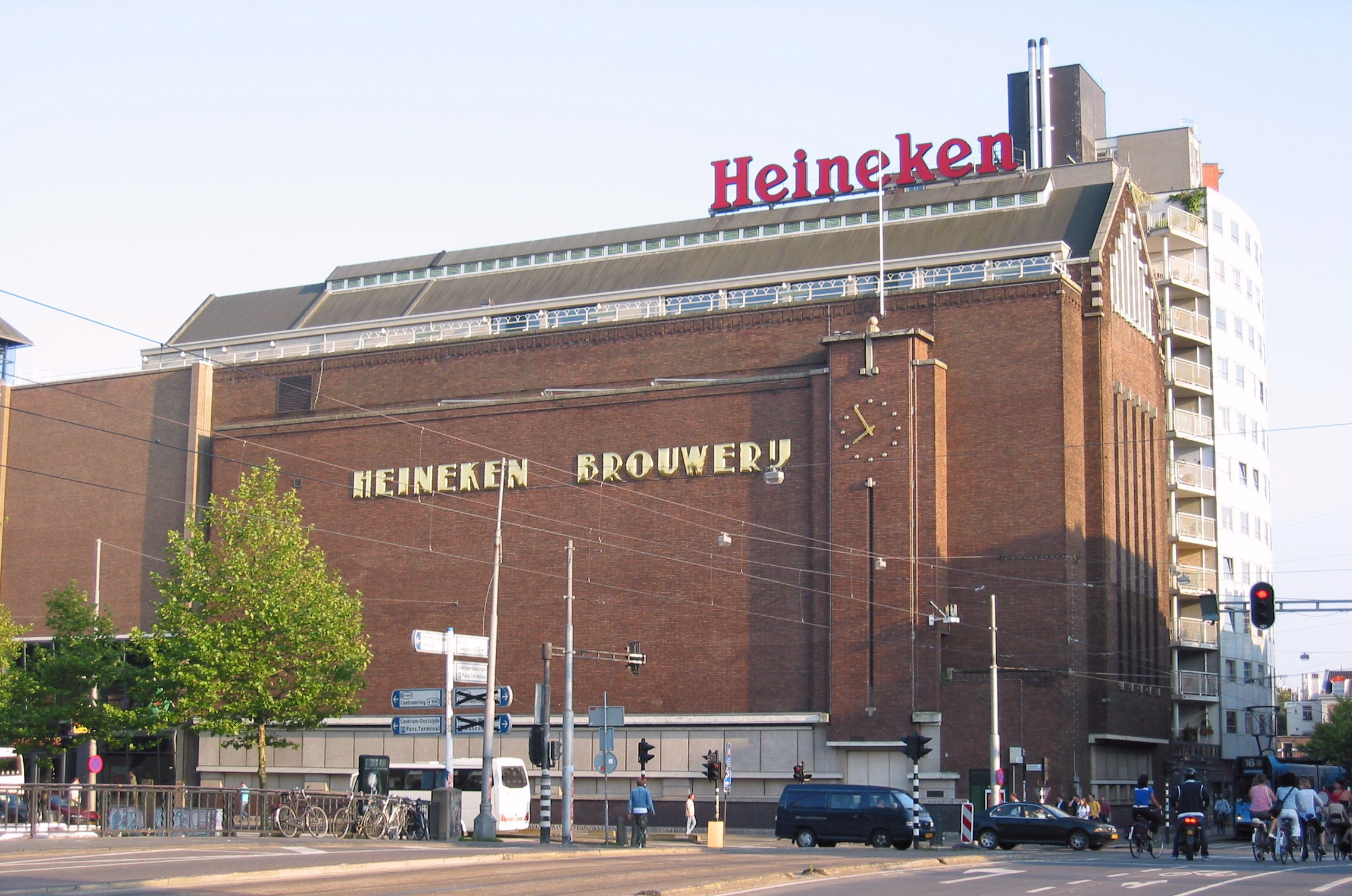
Former Heineken brewery on Stadhouderskade, Amsterdam.

On 15 February 1864 he arranged the purchase of the Amsterdam brewery De Hooiberg ("The Haystack"). De Hooiberg had been established in 1592. In 1873 he reorganised it into what became Heinekens Bierbrouwerij Maatschappij (HBM). He also moved it to the Stadhouderskade (Street in Amsterdam) site in those years.

During the 1870s the business shifted production from traditional top-fermented beer to Bavarian-style bottom-fermented lager; their board decided in January 1873 the discontinuation of "Hollandsch bier" in favour of Bavarian beer at the Stadhouderskade brewery. Expansion included a second production site in Rotterdam in the mid-1870s (Crooswijksesingel/Crooswijk).

Heineken supported laboratory-based quality control and the adoption of pure yeast culture. By 1886, the company's Rotterdam laboratory, led by Hartog Elion, was cultivating pure yeast strains later known as A-yeast (and D-yeast).

Heineken's brewery gained international recognition. In 1875 it was awarded the Médaille d'Or (Gold Medal) at the International Maritime Exposition in Paris, and in 1883 it received the Diplôme d'Honneur (Honorary Diploma) at the International Colonial and Export Exhibition in Amsterdam. Both awards are still referenced on the brand's label.

== Family ==
On 6 April 1871, Heineken married Marie ("Mary") Tindal. Their son Henry Pierre Heineken was born in 1886; questions of paternity became public in the 2010s, although it was discussed within the family and had been revealed in 1890. After Heineken's death in 1893, management remained with the directors; his son joined the board in 1914 and became chairman in 1917.

== Legacy ==
Heineken contributed to Amsterdam's civic and cultural life. In 1885 he donated his coin and medal collection to the city's museum collections, augmenting existing municipal holdings.

Through his early adoption of industrial brewing methods and export orientation, he established the foundation for the enterprise that would evolve into Heineken N.V., one of the world's largest breweries as of 2025.
