= Sierra Leone Brewery Limited =

Coordinates: 8°26′33.1″N 13°09′54″W

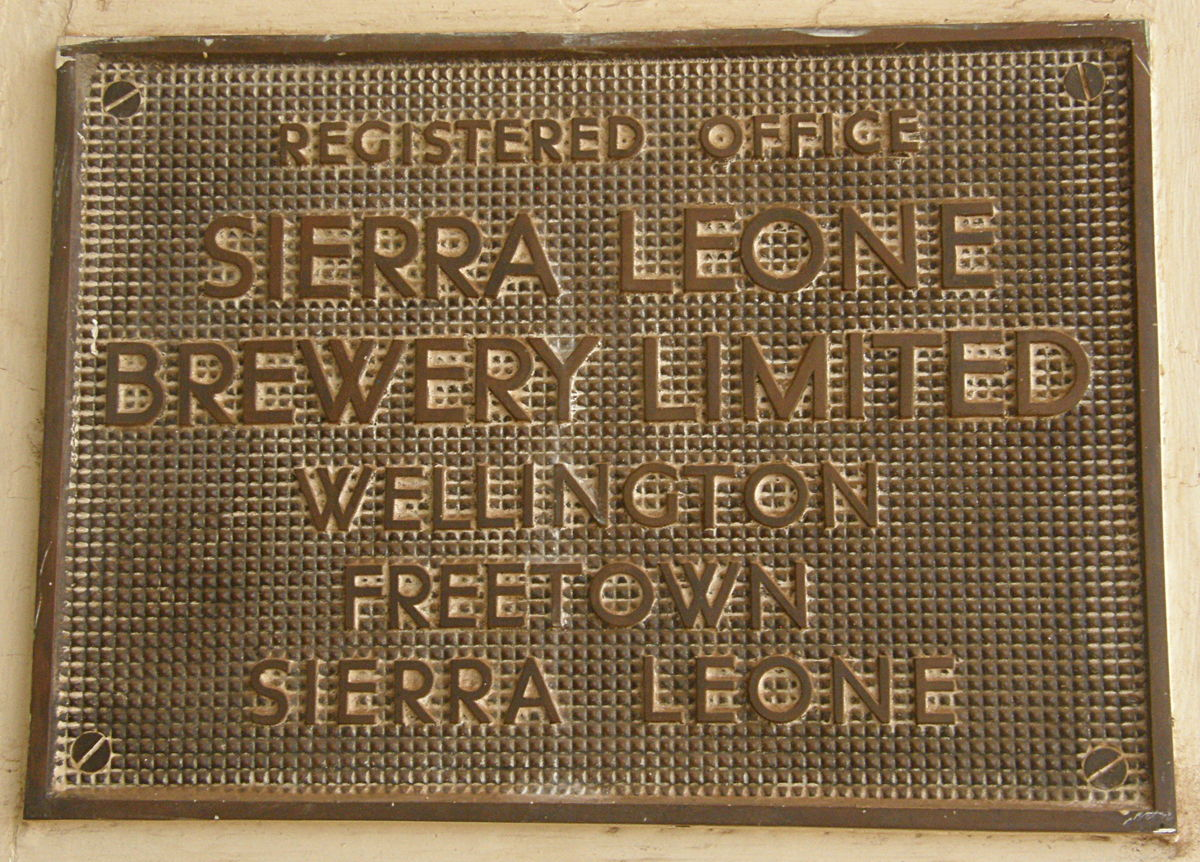
- Founded: Freetown, Sierra Leone (March 16, 1963)
- Headquarters: Freetown, Sierra Leone
- Key people: Willy Ngana (MD)
- Products: Beer, The brewing, marketing, and selling of lager, stout, and malt drink)
- Brands: Star, Maltina, Heineken, Guinness, Mutzig
- Owner: Heineken (83.15%) Guinness (11.59%); Paterson Zochonis (3.02%) Sierra Leoneans (2.24%)
- Number of employees: 125

Heineken and United African Company (UAC) began construction of the Sierra Leone Brewery Limited in October 1961 in Wellington Industrial Estate in Freetown, and the first brew was mashed-in on 23 November 1962. The first brand to be brewed was Star Lager.

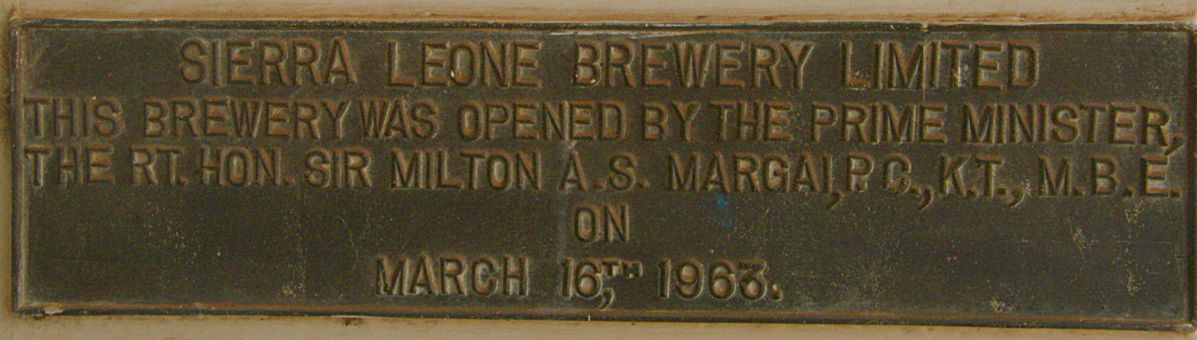
A Brass plaque recording the opening of the Sierra Leone Brewery by Sir Milton Margai on 16 March 1963

It closed for six months in 1982 following a shortage of foreign exchange, reopening after the end of the rainy season. During the 1997 Military Coup, the brewing stopped for six months after the brewery was ransacked. On 6 January 1999, the rebel forces looted the brewery, stopping production for one and a half years.

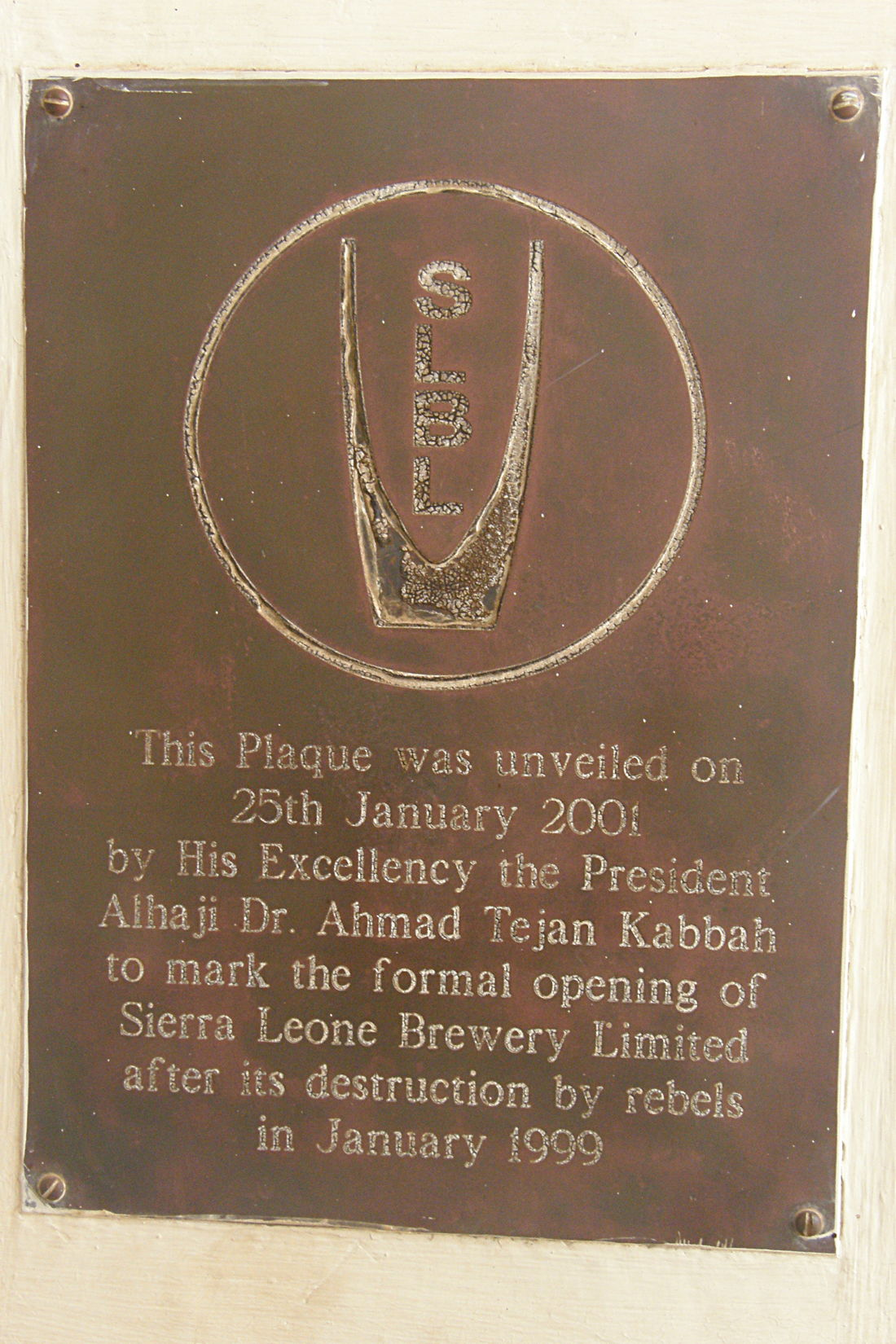
A brass plaque recording the reopening of the Sierra Leone Brewery by Ahmad Tejan Kabbah after the destruction of the brewery by rebels in the civil war.

== Products ==
- Star Lager - Pale Lager (launched in 1962)
- Amstel
- Guinness Foreign Extra Stout 7.5% ABV (launched in 1967)
- Mützig Lager (October 2013)
- Salone Beer (made of 100% sorghum)
- Maltina (Alcohol-free)
- Trenk Dark Malt Energy Drink

== Community investment ==
In 2006 a program was started to encourage local farmers to grow sorghum as part of a local sourcing drive. The current target of the local sourcing program is to receive 60% of raw materials from within Africa. The production of Salone Beer, made with 100% sorghum, has created a reliable source of income for over 12,000 farming families.
