= Heineken Malaysia =

Malaysian beverage manufacturer

Heineken Malaysia Berhad
- Type: Public limited company
- Traded as: MYX: 3255
- ISIN: MYL3255OO006
- Industry: Beverage
- Founded: 24 January 1964; 62 years ago in Petaling Jaya, Selangor, Malaysia
- Headquarters: Sungei Way Brewery, Lot 1135, Batu 9, Jalan Klang Lama, 46000, Petaling Jaya, Malaysia, Petaling Jaya, Malaysia
- Area served: Malaysia
- Key people: Idris Jala (Non Executive Chairman) Roland Bala (Managing Director)
- Brands: Beers, stouts, ciders, shandy, non-alcoholic malt beverages
- Owners: Heineken Malaysia Berhad; Heineken N.V.
- Website: www.heinekenmalaysia.com

Heineken Malaysia Berhad (HEINEKEN Malaysia) (MYX: 3255) is a major producer of beer, stout, cider and non-alcoholic malt beverages in Malaysia and has been listed on the Main Board of Bursa Malaysia since 1965. Among the brands they produce and market are Heineken, Tiger Beer, Tiger Crystal, Guinness, Strongbow Apple Ciders, Apple Fox Cider, Anchor Smooth, Kilkenny, Anglia, and Malta. The company also imports and distributes Heineken 0.0, Paulaner and Kirin Ichiban.

== History ==
Heineken Malaysia Berhad was first incorporated on 24 January 1964 under the name Guinness Malaysia Limited. It has been operating the Sungei Way Brewery which started its operations in 1965. Located in Selangor, the brewery occupies a land area of 23.72 acres (96,000 m^{2}). On 15 April 1966, the name changed to Guinness Malaysia Berhad.

Following the merger of Guinness Malaysia Berhad and Malayan Breweries (Malaya) Sdn Bhd in 1989, a new joint venture company, Guinness Anchor Berhad, was formed. GAPL Pte Ltd served as the holding company whilst Malayan Breweries (Malaya) became a dormant wholly owned subsidiary of the company.

On 7 October 2015, the company announced that Heineken N.V. acquired the remaining shares owned by Diageo Plc in GAPL Pte Ltd. Heineken N.V. controls 100% of GAPL which holds 51% equity interest in Heineken Malaysia Berhad. On 15 March 2016, the company announced its name change from GAB to Heineken Malaysia Berhad effective 21 April 2016, to reflect the corporate identity and branding of the company and its relationship with the Heineken group of companies.

== Management structure ==
- Board of Directors
  - Dato' Sri Idris Jala
  - Roland Bala
  - Martin Giles Manen
  - Datin Ngiam Pick Ngoh, Linda
  - Leo Evers
  - Yu Yu-Ping
  - Lim Rern Ming, Geraldine

- Management Team
  - Roland Bala
  - Szilard Voros
  - Renuka Indrarajah
  - Vasily Baranov
  - Pablo Chabot
  - Kukarajan (Kuhan) Kanagarajan
  - Salima Bekoeva
  - Janina Vrieesekoop

== Shareholding structure ==
The shares of Heineken Malaysia are traded on Bursa Malaysia under the symbols: HEIM. The shareholding in the company's stock is depicted in the table below:

Rank	Name of Owner	% Ownership
1	GAPL Pte Ltd^{1}	51
2	Public	49
	Total	100

1. 51% of Heineken Malaysia's equity interest is held indirectly by Heineken N.V. via its wholly owned subsidiary, GAPL Pte Ltd.

== Brands ==
=== Beer ===
- Heineken

Heineken is a 5% alcohol by volume (ABV) pale lager that is one of Heineken Malaysia's flagship products. It is brewed using an original recipe since 1873 from three main ingredients: water, malt (barley), and hops. The beer is recognisable for its iconic green bottle and red star.

- Heineken 0.0

Heineken 0.0 is a non-alcoholic malt beverage that was launched in the Netherlands in 2017 and introduced in Malaysia in July 2019. The beverage is double brewed with natural ingredients including water, malted barley, hops and yeast then undergoes a de-alcoholisation process.

- Tiger Beer

Tiger Beer is a 5% ABV Asian lager, first brewed in 1932 by Malayan Breweries Limited in Singapore. Available in over 60 countries worldwide, the lager has won over 50 international awards and accolade.

- Tiger Crystal

A variant of regular Tiger Beer, Tiger Crystal is a light lager with a 4.2% ABV, brewed at -1 °C giving the beverage a low bitterness and refreshing finish. Initially released as a limited-edition beverage in conjunction with the Lunar Year of the Tiger in Malaysia in 2010, the beverage returned in 2019 after proving to be a success across markets in Asia.

- Anchor Smooth

Anchor Smooth was the first lager to be brewed locally in Malaysia in 1933. The lager has a 4.0% ABV, brewed to a smooth blend of aromatic hops.

- Kilkenny

Kilkenny is a 4.0% ABV Irish ale that originated from the city of Kilkenny in Ireland in 1710. The red velvety ale combines the bitterness of hops with the sweetness from the malt along with hints of coffee from the roasted barley. This gives the beverage a mix of fruity, floral and malty aromas.

- Paulaner

Paulaner is a 5.5% ABV German wheat beer that is brewed using a membrane filtration system which ensures a gentle filtration process to produce a clear beer.

- Kirin Ichiban

Kirin Ichiban is a Japanese 100% malt beer with a 5.0% ABV. Available in more than 40 countries, the beer was first introduced in Malaysia in 2014, making it Heineken Malaysia's first Japanese product in its portfolio. The beer is brewed using a “First Press” method where only the first press of malt is extracted to make the beer. This gives the beverage a crisp, rich flavour that leaves an aftertaste.

=== Stout ===
- Guinness

Guinness is a 5.5% ABV stout recognised for its distinct taste and heritage. The beverage sells more than 10 million pints daily worldwide. In 1965, Heineken Malaysia brewed the first Guinness at its Sungei Way Brewery. Heineken Malaysia is a 5-time winner of the “Guinness League of Excellence,” in recognition for being the best brew in the world outside of Dublin.

=== Cider ===
- Strongbow Apple Ciders

Strongbow Apple Ciders is a 4.5% ABV cider sold globally in over 70 countries. Launched in the UK in 1960 by H.P. Bulmer, the beverage uses apples grown and harvested from Herefordshire where the cider is pressed and bottled.

- Apple Fox Cider

Launched in 2017, Apple Fox Cider is a 4.5% ABV New Zealand-inspired cider produced in Heineken Malaysia. Using apples sourced from orchards over the world, this gives the cider a crisp texture and intense flavour.

=== Other brands in Heineken Malaysia’s portfolio ===
- Anglia Shandy

Anglia Shandy is a beverage made of a blend of beer and fizzy lemonade with an ABV of less than 1%.

- Malta

Malta is a lightly carbonated non-alcoholic malt beverage containing high concentrations of vitamins B1, B3 and B6.

== Economic Contributions ==
=== Taxes ===
Heineken Malaysia contributed over RM1.3 billion in taxes to the Malaysian government annually.

=== Employment/Jobs creation ===
As part of the brewing industry, the company contributes to the creation of over 60,000 jobs in Malaysia.

== Corporate social responsibility ==
=== Sustainability ===
- HEINEKEN's Global sustainability strategy - Brewing a Better World (BaBW)

The BaBW supports 10 out of 17 of the United Nations Sustainable Development Goals.

- Value Chain - The company's sustainability strategy covers the entire value chain ‘From Barley to Bar’.

=== Advocating Responsible Consumption ===
Heineken Malaysia promotes their products responsibly, advocating responsible consumption to create a sensible drinking culture through their Drink Sensibly platform.

=== Community ===
- SPARK Foundation

SPARK Foundation is the CSR arm of Heineken Malaysia established in 2007. Most of the company's community programmes are carried out under SPARK Foundation to bring about positive social and environmental change.

- W.A.T.E.R (Working Actively Through Education and Rehabilitation) Project
- English Enrichment Training Programme
- Partnerships

== Awards ==
Year	Award
2019	Sustainable Business Awards (SBA) 2019 Heineken Malaysia received the Best Water Management Award, and received a Special Recognition under two categories: Sustainability in the Community and Waste & Material Productivity. Putra Brand Awards 2019 Heineken was awarded with the platinum award, while Tiger and Guinness both won gold. CSR Malaysia Awards 2019 Heineken Malaysia was awarded "Company of the Year" by CSR Malaysia for the manufacturing sector for its water and education initiatives such as the potable water systems in Sabah, the English Enrichment Training Programme in seven states and the Tiger Chinese Education programme.
2018	Putra Brand Awards 2018 Heineken won a gold, while both Tiger and Guinness won silvers under the beverage-alcoholic category. Sustainable Business Awards (SBA) 2018 Heineken Malaysia won two awards: the Best Water Management Award and Special Recognition for Flagship Initiative. National Annual Corporate Report Awards (NACRA) 2018 Heineken Malaysia was awarded the Certificate of Merit in recognition of its annual report.
2017	Putra Brand Awards 2017 Heineken collected the gold award, Tiger bagged the silver award, while Guinness received the bronze award. ACCA Malaysia Sustainability Reporting Awards (MaSRA) Heineken Malaysia was shortlisted under the category of ‘Sustainability Reporting’ for the 2015 Corporate Responsibility Report – ‘A Commitment to Sustainability’.
2016	Putra Brand Awards 2016 Both Heineken and Tiger won silver, while Guinness brought home a bronze.
2015	Putra Brand Awards 2015 Heineken was awarded the Putra Brand Icon for winning the gold award for four consecutive years. The same year, Tiger won a silver award. Ethical Corporation Responsible Business Awards 2015 The Drink Sensibly festive campaign was shortlisted as the ‘Best Engagement Campaign’ in the Communications Excellence category.
2014	Putra Brand Awards 2014 GAB wins three awards: Tiger and Heineken (gold), and Guinness (silver) bringing the total number of wins to 16 awards in the last five years.
2013	Reader's Digest Trusted Brand Awards 2013 Tiger was recognised as the Nation's Most Trusted Beer in the Food and Beverage category. MDBC Sustainability Awards 2013 Best Sustainable Supply Chain Management or Logistics Project ACCA Malaysia Sustainability Reporting Awards (MaSRA) Awards 2013 For the work and reporting done in the area of Product Responsibility in GAB's Corporate Responsibility report Putra Brand Awards 2013 Heineken received gold for the second consecutive year. Guinness wins its first gold award and Tiger was awarded silver
2012	Putra Brand Awards 2012 GAB received the most number of awards in the Beverage (Alcoholic) category: Tiger and Heineken (gold), Anchor (silver) and Guinness (bronze)
2011	Giant Supplier of the Year Awards 2011 In the Alcohol category for GAB's performance, execution and activation, service level, brand shares, business relationship and publicity The Edge Billion Ringgit Club Top 10 CSR Companies 2011 GAB was recognised as the Top 5 most profitable companies with the highest return on equity in the consumer products sector and one of the top 10 CSR companies Asia Responsible Entrepreneurship Awards (AREA) 2011 This is the second year GAB received the award for its Investment in People category Brand Laureate Awards 2011 Heineken received the award for Best Brand in Beer in the Heritage Brand category MDBC Sustainability Awards 2011 GAB won the inaugural Malaysian Dutch Business Council Sustainability Awards for its corporate sustainability practices in the area of Human Resources and Community Development Putra Brand Awards 2011 Heineken (silver), Tiger and Guinness (bronze) Guinness League of Excellence (GLoE) Award 2011 GAB is the only brewery in the world to have won the awards five years in a row (2007 – 2011)
2010	MCG Index Awards 2010 Distinction Award for Overall Malaysian Corporate Governance (CG) and for Most Improved Company Malaysia HR Awards 2010 Silver Recognition for the Employer of Choice Award Global CSR Awards 2010 Silver Award in the Workplace Excellence StarBiz–ICR Malaysia CR Awards 2010 For community projects carried out through GAB Foundation World Beer Cup 2010 Two gold awards for Tiger Beer in the International Lager Style category and Tiger Crystal in the Australian, Latin American or Tropical-Style Light Lager category Putra Brand Awards 2010 Three awards at the inaugural Putra Brand Awards: Tiger (gold), Heineken (silver) and Guinness (bronze) Guinness League of Excellence (GLoE) Award 2010 This is the fourth consecutive year GAB received the award since 2007 for brewing the best Guinness outside of Dublin

== See also ==
- Alcohol in Malaysia
- Beer in Malaysia
