= Shanghai Mila Brewery =

Brewery in Shanghai, China

The Shanghai Mila Brewery is a brewery which was founded in 1987 as the Yimin Brewery in Shanghai. It was taken over by Asia Pacific Breweries in 2001 but then divested in 2013 so that the Shanghai Asia Pacific Brewery is not now part of the APB group.

The brewery's best-selling beer is Reeb which has about a third of the market in the Shanghai area.
