= Lagunitas Brewing Company =

1993-2015 craft brewery; then became Heineken subsidiary

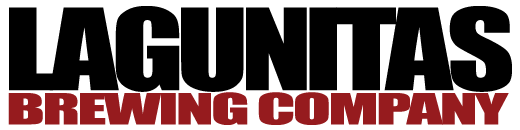

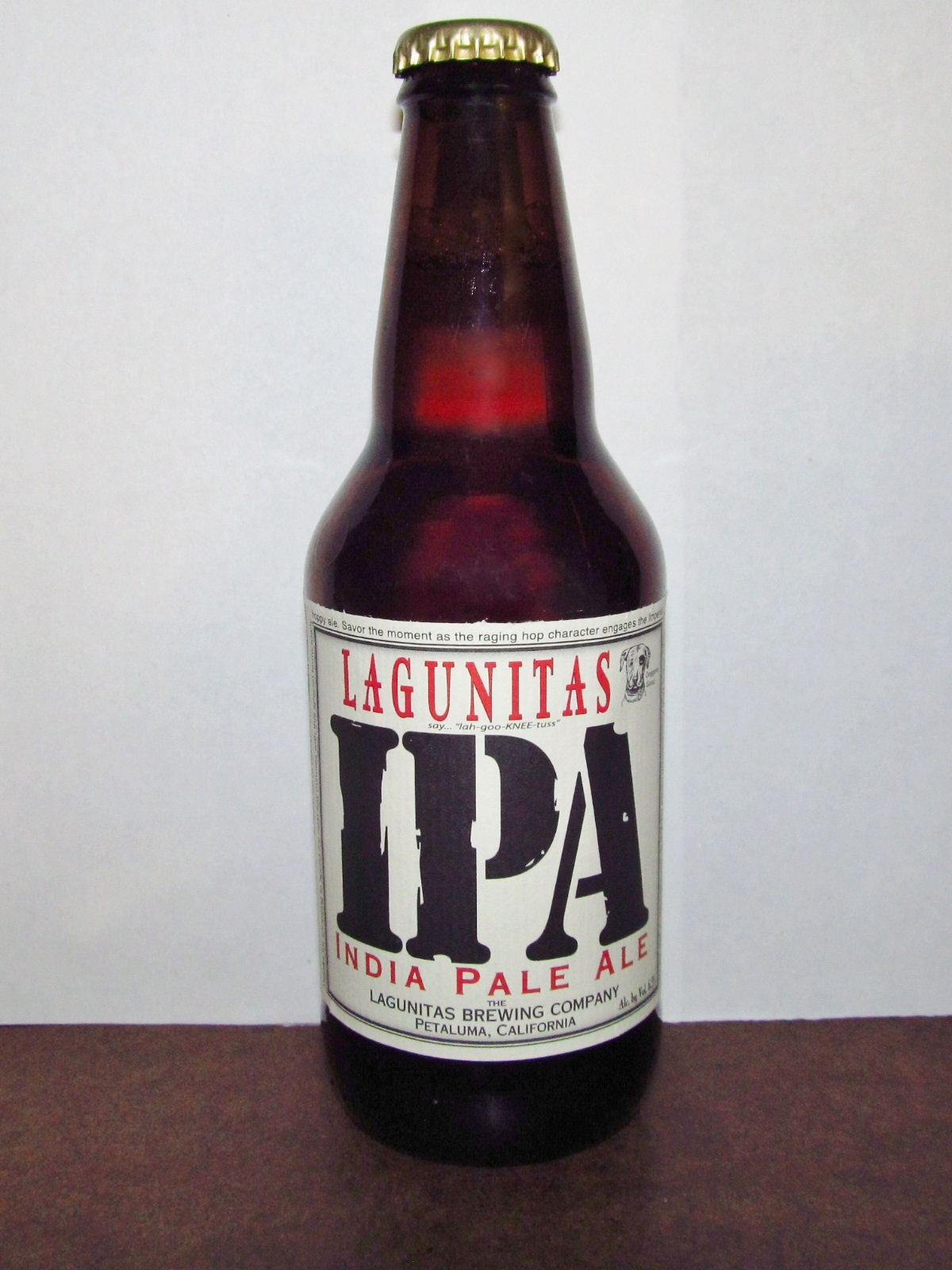
- Lagunitas India Pale Ale
- Interactive map of Lagunitas Brewing Company
- Location: Petaluma, California, United States
- Coordinates: 38°16′21″N 122°39′45″W
- Opened: 1993
- Key people: Tony Magee (Founder)
- Annual production volume: 916,420 US beer barrels (1,075,400 hL)
- Owner: Heineken International
- Website: lagunitas.com

The Lagunitas Brewing Company, founded in 1993 in Lagunitas, California, is a subsidiary of Heineken International. Before Heineken bought a 50% share of the company in 2015, the company met the definition of a craft brewery. Two years prior it ranked fifth top-selling craft brewery in the US. Heineken purchased the remainder of the company in 2017.

== History ==
The brewery was founded in 1993 by Tony Magee in Lagunitas, California, and moved a year later to nearby Petaluma, California, after they quickly outgrew their original rural West Marin location.

Lagunitas became one of the fastest-growing craft breweries in the United States. Production increased from 27,000 US bbl (32,000 hL) in 2004 to 106,000 US bbl (124,000 hL) in 2010. In March 2011, Lagunitas had 92 employees with distribution in 32 states. In 2012, Lagunitas began a $9.5 million expansion, which increased its brewing capacity to 600,000 US bbl (700,000 hL).

Also in 2012, Lagunitas began construction of a satellite brewery in the North Lawndale neighborhood of Chicago. The brewery was in a "space owned by film studio Cinespace "for at least 20 years." The Chicago brewery started producing beer on April 18, 2014, and opened an on-premises taproom a few months later. The Chicago brewery closed in 2024.

Lagunitas planned to build a third brewery in Azusa, California. However, it has not opened due to a slowdown in growth. In December 2014, Lagunitas sued Sierra Nevada Brewing Company over the use and style of the letters "IPA" on Sierra Nevada's label. The lawsuit was dropped a month later after public outcry.

In 2015, Heineken International acquired a 50% stake in Lagunitas enabling Lagunitas to expand its operations globally. However, since Heineken's stake was greater than 25%, Lagunitas no longer met the Brewers Association definition of "craft brewery". In 2017, Heineken purchased the rest of Lagunitas, becoming sole owner. Founder Tony Magee continued as CEO of Lagunitas, with the intention of expanding production and distribution of Lagunitas beers worldwide.

== Cannabis associations ==
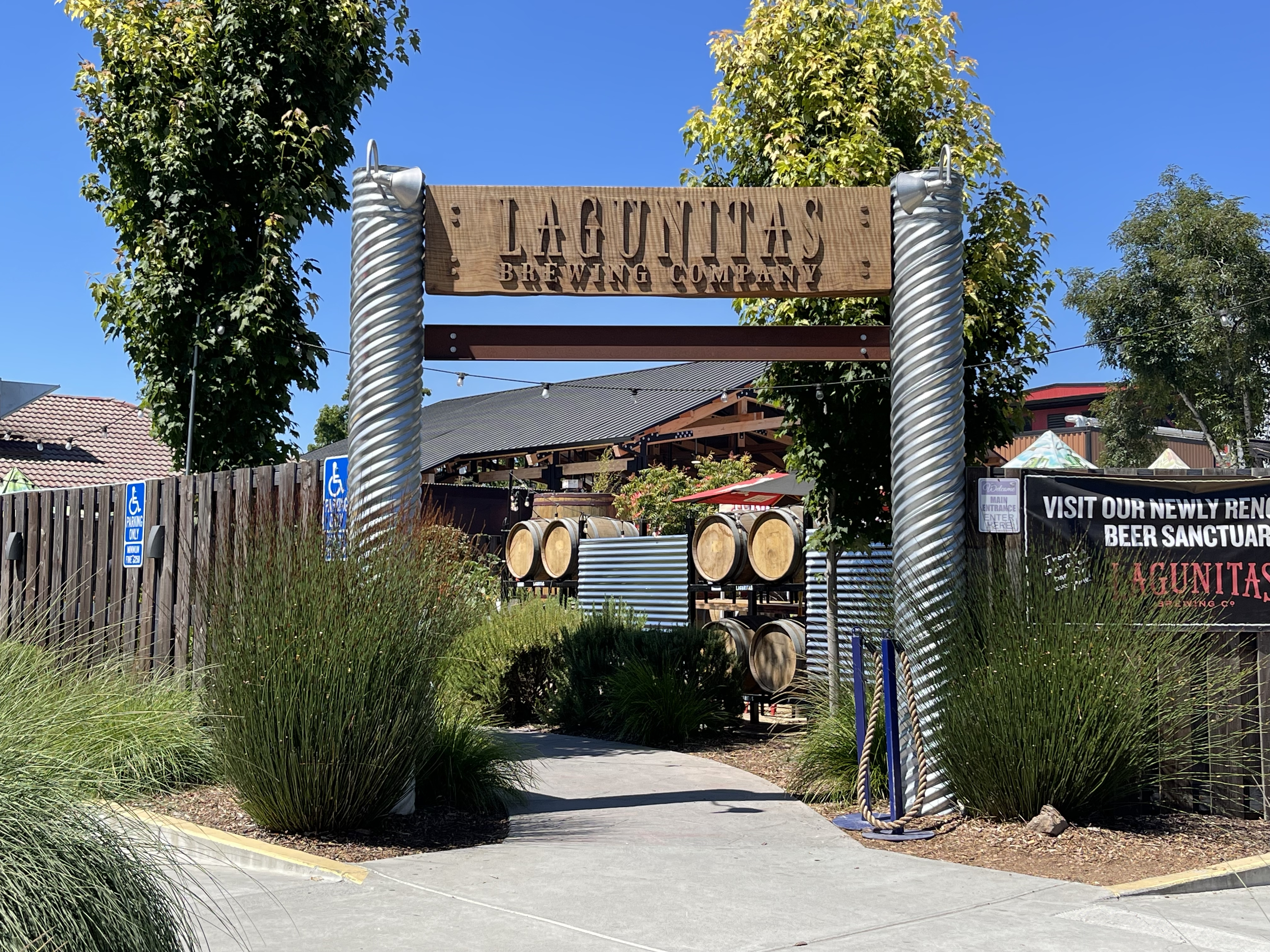
The entrance to the Lagunitas Brewing Company Taproom in Petaluma, California, July 2023

The brewery has long-standing associations with cannabis, which have at times caused legal problems. Some beers have had names associated with the plant, in one case resulting in a name being banned, (Note: Censored was original called "the Kronik", which was banned by the BATF as a cannabis reference (see The Chronic), while The Waldos' Special Ale is released on 4/20 and formerly featured 420 in its branding.) and using the number 420 in internal materials and external advertising. (Note: Production numbers have ended in 420, rather than in an even thousand, since 2004.)

On Saint Patrick's Day in 2005, the California Department of Alcoholic Beverage Control raided a weekly tasting party at the brewery to investigate alleged cannabis dealing by employees. Officers had staked out the brewery for two months to observe people consuming cannabis on the premises. No charges were filed. Magee admits "no one was willing to sell it to them, but everyone was willing to give it to them for free." Lagunitas was found in violation of Section 24200 of California's Business and Professions Code, better known as its "disorderly house" law. Lagunitas was eventually served a twenty-day suspension of operations and the ordeal was commemorated with a beer named Undercover Investigation Shut-down Ale.

Lagunitas dropped '420' from its labels in 2013 after a trademark claim by Sweetwater Brewing Company. In 2018, Lagunitas released a IPA-inspired sparkling water infused with THC and CBD. The beverage is called "Hi-Fi Hops" and is a collaboration with AbsoluteXtracts, a cannabis grower. It is currently only available in California.

== See also ==
- California breweries
