= Heineken Lao Brewery =

Laos beer producer

Heineken Lao Brewery Co. Ltd
- Industry: Alcoholic beverage
- Founded: 2008
- Headquarters: Vientiane, Laos
- Products: Beer
- Owner: Heineken Asia Pacific, Government of Laos, SBK Consultant Ltd.
- Number of employees: 172
- Parent: Heineken Asia Pacific
- Website: Official website

Heineken Lao Brewery (HLB), previously known as Lao Asia Pacific Breweries, is a producer of beer in Laos and is based in Vientiane. It is the second brewer to be granted a beer investment license by the Government of Laos. The company was known as Lao Asia Pacific Breweries (LAPB) prior to March 2017.

== History ==
Heineken Lao Brewery is a joint-venture between Heineken Asia Pacific (68%), the Government of Laos (25%) and SBK Consultant Ltd (7%). It opened its first brewery on 12 March 2008, at a cost of €23 million, with an initial capacity of 300,000 hectolitres per annum. The brewery was officially opened by Singapore’s Deputy Prime Minister and Minister for Home Affairs and Lao’s Deputy Prime Minister and Chairman State Control Commission.

== Products ==
The company currently produces and distributes four beers, Heineken, Tiger Beer, Namkhong and Namkhong Special.

=== Heineken ===
Heineken (5% ABV) is available in 330ml and 500ml cans, 330ml bottles as well as 640ml bottles and brew under a license from its parent company. It is commonly seen in premium restaurants and western bars in the urban areas of Laos and gaining popularity amongst the young drinkers.

=== Tiger Beer ===
Tiger Beer, a 5% ABV bottled pale lager originally from Singapore, is sold in 640ml bottles and draught.

=== Namkhong Beer ===
Namkhong Beer (5% ABV) was launched in Laos as the second local beer brand in Laos in 2008 and sold in 330ml cans, 640ml bottles and draught. Namkhong Beer has been awarded the Gold Quality Award in 2011 and 2013 at the Monde Selection, International Institute for Quality Selections founded in Brussels, the capital of Belgium. In 2016, Namkhong Beer announced a new value proposition and sells at less than USD 8 for a crate of twelve 640ml bottles.

=== Namkhong Special ===
In 2014, Namkhong Special (5% ABV) was launched with only 640ml bottles. Namkhong Special is a beer brewed with black rice, which is seen as a nutritious and premium type of rice in Laos. The beer is commonly known as "Beer Khao Khum" which means "Black Rice Beer" in Lao. In 2015, Namkhong Special was awarded with a Silver Award in the Monde Selection quality awards.
