= Heineken Hungária =

Hungarian subsidiary of Heineken Group

HEINEKEN Hungária Sorgyárak Zrt.
- Type: Subsidiary
- Industry: Beverage
- Founded: 1895; 131 years ago in Sopron, Hungary
- Area served: Hungary
- Products: Beer, cider, non-alcoholic beverages
- Number of employees: 587 (2019)
- Parent: Heineken N.V.

The Heineken Hungaria Breweries Plc., as a Hungarian subsidiary of the international Heineken Group. It has two sites in Hungary in Sopron and Martfű, based on the former Sopron Brewery (Soproni Sörgyár) and Martfű Brewery (Martfűi Sörgyár).

== History ==
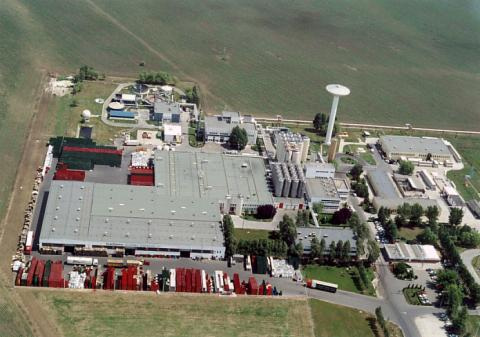
The brewery in Martfű

The Sopron brewery was founded in 1895 by the merchants of the town and the owners of the brewery in Brno, relying on the Czech brewing tradition. In 1949 it was nationalized and from 1971 it was a part of the Magyar Országos Söripari Tröszt (Hungarian National Brewery Trust). It became independent again in 1982 and from 1988 it purchased some licenses of Austrian brands (e.g. Steffl, Kaiser).

The Martfű brewing plant of Heineken Hungária is a young brewery as it was founded in 1981 to respond to the regional scarcity of beer in the market at that time. The brewery finally went into production in 1985 near the city of Szolnok.

As a result of privatisation, the Martfű and the Sopron breweries were controlled by the Austrian Bräu-Union AG, who merged them under the name of Soproni Sörgyár Rt. (Sopron Brewery). At the end of 2003, Heineken N.V. purchased the Austrian parent, the Brau Union Group, and the Hungarian operation thus became a member of one of the world's leading conglomerates.

The company has been continuing business as Heineken Hungária from June 2007.
