= List of African musicians =

This is a list of musicians from African countries

== Algeria ==
See: List of Algerian musicians

== Angola ==
See: List of Angolan musicians

== Benin ==
- Angelique Kidjo
- Wally Badarou
- Orchestre Poly-Rythmo de Cotonou

== Botswana ==
- Banjo Mosele
- Franco and Afro Musica
- Katlego Kai Kolanyane-Kesupile
- Matsieng
- Joe Morris
- Zeus

== Burkina Faso ==
- Balaké
- Cheikh Lô
- Dramane Kone
- Farafina

== Burundi ==
- Khadja Nin
- Sat-B
- Miss Erica

== Cameroon ==
See: List of Cameroonian musicians

== Cape Verde ==
- Cesária Évora
- Gil Semedo

== Côte d'Ivoire ==
- Alpha Blondy
- Magic System
- Nayanka Bell
- Monique Séka
- Ernesto Djédjé
- Tiken Jah Fakoly
- DJ Arafat
- Serge Beynaud

== Republic of the Congo (Congo-Brazzaville) ==
- Bisso Na Bisso
- Youlou Mabiala
- Pierre Moutouari
- Franklin Boukaka

== Democratic Republic of the Congo (former Zaire) ==
See: List of Democratic Republic of the Congo musicians

== Egypt ==
See: List of Egyptian musicians

== Eritrea ==
- Abraham Afewerki

== Gabon ==
- Oliver N'Goma
- Patience Dabany
- Annie-Flore Batchiellilys

== Gambia ==
- Sona Maya Jobarteh
- Foday Musa Suso

== Guinea ==
- Sona Tata Condé
- Sekouba Bambino
- Les Ballets Africains
- Balla et ses Balladins
- Bembeya Jazz
- Djeli Moussa Diawara
- Famoudou Konaté
- Mory Kanté
- Mamady Keita
- Ballet Nimba
- Mista Shaw

== Guinea-Bissau ==
- José Carlos Schwarz
- Eneida Marta

== Madagascar ==
See: List of Malagasy musicians

== Mali ==
- Vieux Farke Touré
- Boubacar Traoré
- Mory Kanté
- Salif Keita
- Toumani Diabaté
- Kandia Kouyaté
- Habib Koité
- Issa Bagayogo
- Rokia Traoré
- Tinariwen
- Ali Farka Touré
- Amadou et Mariam
- Oumou Sangaré
- Afel Bocoum
- Lobi Traoré
- Fatoumata Diawara
- Djelimady Tounkara
- Rail Band

== Mauritania ==
- Dimi Mint Abba
- Malouma
- Noura Mint Seymali

== Mozambique ==
- Wazimbo
- Ghorwane
- Fany Pfumo
- Stewart Sukuma
- Moreira Chonguica
- Lizha James
- Neyma
- Mingas
- Al Bowlly
- Wazimbo
- 340ml
- Afric Simone
- Zena Abacar

== Namibia ==
- Jericho

== Niger ==
- Mamar Kassey
- Mdou Moctar

== Nigeria ==
See List of Nigerian musicians

== Rwanda ==
- Christopher Muneza
- Ariel Wayz
- Alpha Rwirangira
- Tom Close
- Butera Knowless
- The Ben
- Urban Boyz
- Simon Bikindi
- Corneille (singer)
- Miss Jojo

== Senegal ==
- Akon
- Baaba Maal
- Étoile de Dakar
- Ismaël Lô
- Mansour Seck
- Orchestra Baobab
- Positive Black Soul
- Thione Seck and Raam Daan
- Star Band
- Touré Kunda
- Youssou N'Dour and Étoile de Dakar
- Xalam (band)

== Sierra Leone ==
- Bai Kamara
- S. E. Rogie
- Steady Bongo
- K-Man
- Emmerson
- Anis Halloway
- Supa Laj

== Somalia ==
- Xiddigaha Geeska
- Mohamed Mooge Liibaan
- Abdullahi Qarshe
- Waayaha Cusub
- Ali Feiruz
- Hasan Adan Samatar
- Aar Maanta
- Mohamed Sulayman Tubeec
- Maryam Mursal
- K'naan
- Guduuda 'Arwo
- Magool

== South Africa ==
See: List of South African musicians

== South Sudan ==
- Yaba Angelosi
- Mary Boyoi
- Emmanuel Jal
- Viviana Nyachan
- Silver X

== Sudan ==
- Abdel Aziz El Mubarak
- Abdel Gadir Salim
- AlKabli
- Emmanuel Jal
- Mohammed Wardi

== Swaziland ==
- Dusty & Stones
- Tendaness

== Tanzania ==
- Ali Kiba
- Bill Nass
- Freddie Mercury
- Joseph Lusungu
- Mnenge Ramadhani
- Muhiddin Maalim
- Hassani Bitchuka
- Saidi Mabera
- Remmy Ongala
- Kasaloo Kyanga
- Mr. Nice
- Saida Karoli
- Diamond Platnumz
- Lady Jaydee
- Professor Jay
- TID
- Rose Mhando
- Vanessa Mdee
- A.Y.
- Ruby
- Rayvanny
- Bi Kidude
- Carola Kinasha
- Imani Sanga

== Togo ==
- Bella Bellow
- Elikeh
- King Mensah
- Jimi Hope
- Abitor Makafui

== Tunisia ==
- Dhafer Youssef

== Uganda ==
See: List of Ugandan musicians

== Zambia ==
See: List of Zambian musicians

== Zimbabwe ==
See: List of Zimbabwean musicians

== See also ==
- List of Soukous musicians
- List of African guitarists
