= Music of Mozambique =

The native folk music of Mozambique has been highly influenced by Portuguese colonisation and local language forms. The most popular style of modern dance music is marrabenta. Mozambican music also influenced another Lusophone music in Brazil, like maxixe (its name derived from Maxixe in Mozambique), and mozambique style in Cuba and New York City.

Culture was an integral part of the struggle for independence, which began in 1964. Leaders of the independence movement used cultural solidarity to gain support from the common people, while the Portuguese colonialists promoted their own culture. By the time independence came in 1975, Mozambican bands had abandoned their previous attempts at European-style music, and began forging new forms out of local folk styles and the new African popular music coming from Zaire, Zimbabwe, Tanzania, Zambia and South Africa.

In 1978, the Ministry of Education and Culture organized a National Dance Festival that involved more than half a million people, and led to the creation of numerous organizations and festivals promoting Mozambican music.

== Timbila ==
The Chopi people of the coastal Inhambane Province are known for a unique kind of xylophone called the mbila (pl: timbila) and the style of music played with it, which "is believed to be the most sophisticated method of composition yet found among preliterate peoples." Ensembles consist of around ten xylophones of four sizes and accompany ceremonial dances with long compositions called ngomi which consist of an overture and ten movements of different tempos and styles. The ensemble leader serves as poet, composer, conductor, and performer, creating a text, improvising a melody partially based on the features of the Chopi's tone language, and composing a second countrapunctal line. The musicians of the ensemble partially improvise their parts according to style, instrumental idiom, and the leader's indications. The composer then consults with the choreographer of the ceremony and adjustments are made. (Nettl 1956, p. 18-19)

== Marrabenta ==
Marrabenta is the best-known form of music from Mozambique. It is urban in origin, and meant for dancing. Marrabenta was born as a fusion of imported European music played on improvised materials. The word marrabenta derives from the Portuguese rebentar (arrabentar in the local vernacular), meaning to break, a reference to cheap guitar strings that snapped quickly. Instruments were fashioned out of tin cans and pieces of wood. Lyrics were usually in local languages, and included songs of social criticism as well as love. Additionally, there are songs whose lyrics are in Portuguese, the official language of Mozambique, for nationwide and international promotion of the songs to other CPLP nations. The late 1970s saw tremendous innovation in marrabenta, as 1001 Music Productions recorded artists and staged large concerts. The compilation album Amanhecer was released, followed by more such LPs under the title Ngoma.

The most influential early marrabenta performer was Fany Pfumo, whose fame began after the success of "Loko ni kumbuka Jorgina". He recorded in South Africa on His Master's Voice and later incorporated South African kwela into his music. The group Orchestra Marrabenta Star de Moçambique formed in 1979, led by long-time performer Wazimbo. The group toured Europe and other parts of the world, and soon brought international recognition to marrabenta.

Many of the most popular musicians in modern Mozambique spent time with Orchestra Marrabenta Star de Moçambique, including Stewart Sukuma, Chico António, Mr. Bow, Neyma, José Mucavel and Mingas, while other popular bands include Ghorwane.

== Pandza ==
Pandza is the newest and most-popular style of Mozambican music, its invention credited to N'Star, Ziqo and Dj Ardiles in Maputo. Pandza is especially popular amongst Mozambican youths and is a mix of marrabenta and ragga. The roots of Pandza originate from marrabenta but pandza has a faster tempo with major influences from ragga and some hip-hop. Most pandza is sung in Portuguese and the Shangana language from Maputo and its lyrics most of the time, elaborate the daily lifestyles of young Mozambicans. The most notable pandza singers in Mozambique today include, Lizha James, Ziqo, Dj Ardiles, N'star, DH, Mr. Kuka, MC Roger, Denny Og, Dj Junior, Cízer Boss and Helio Beatz.

== Hip-hop ==
Mozambican hip-hop is developing bit by bit and it is receiving a positive response. In the first decade of the 21st century, people who were uplifting hip-hop were H2O, G-Pro and Danny OG. Modern hip-hop artists include Bander Artista, Kins Ferna's, Dygo Boy Jurus, Ziqo, Same Blood and Laylizzy. Azagaia, a Maputo-based rapper who was critical of the Mozambican government, was described as "the most influential rapper in Mozambique"; with marches taking place across the country in his honour following his death in 2023.

== See also ==
- International Library of African Music
- Xylophone
- Music of Africa
- Shona music
- Hugh Tracey

== Sources ==
- Nettl, Bruno (1956). Music in Primitive Culture. Harvard University Press.
- Paco, Celso. "A Luta Continua". 2000. In Broughton, Simon and Ellingham, Mark with McConnachie, James and Duane, Orla (Ed.), World Music, Vol. 1: Africa, Europe and the Middle East, pp 579–584. Rough Guides Ltd, Penguin Books. ISBN 1-85828-636-0
- Tracey, Hugh. (1948, reprinted 1970). Chopi Musicians: their Music, Poetry, and Instruments. London: International African Institute and Oxford University Press. SBN 19 724182 4.
