= Joe Morris =

Joe Morris may refer to:

== Music ==
- Joe Morris (trumpeter) (1922–1958), American jazz trumpeter
- Joe Morris, a stage name of Chris Columbus (1902–2002), American jazz drummer
- Joe Morris (guitarist) (born 1955), American jazz guitarist
- Joe Morris (drummer) (born 1960), American studio drummer
- Joe Morris (songwriter) (born 1966), Botswanan songwriter and musician

== Other ==
- Joe Morris (trade unionist) (1913–1996), Canadian trade unionist
- Joe Morris Sr. (1926–2011), Navajo code talker
- Joe Morris (American football) (born 1960), American former NFL running back
- Joe Hall Morris (1922–2003), oral surgeon and educator
- Joe Morris (rugby union) (born 1998), English rugby union player
- Joe Morris, suspected bomber of the Dar Al-Farooq Islamic Center in Bloomington, Minnesota
- Joe Morris, American businessman whose business ventures with Bernard Garrett were dramatized in the 2020 film The Banker
- Joe Morris (politician), British politician

== See also ==
- Joseph Morris (disambiguation)
