= Joseph Morris =

Joseph Morris may refer to:

- Joseph Morris (architect) (1836–1915), English architect
- Joseph Morris (Alberta politician) (1868–1937), politician in Alberta, Canada
- Joseph Wilson Morris (1922–2021), U.S. federal judge
- Joseph Morris (Ohio politician) (1795–1854), U.S. Representative from Ohio
- Joseph Morris (died 1862), leader of a schismatic Latter Day Saint sect called the Church of the Firstborn
- Joseph Robert Morris (1828–1885), American businessman and Mayor of Houston, Texas
- Joseph Morris (railway manager) (1845-1928) Superintendent of the Line for the Great Western Railway
- Joseph W. Morris (politician) (1879–1937), U.S. Representative from Kentucky
- Joseph W. Morris (educator) (1850–1913), lawyer and professor in South Carolina
- Joseph M. Bachelor (1889–1947), author known commonly by the pen name Joseph Morris
- Jo Morris (bowls), women's England international lawn and indoor bowler
- Joseph Morris (music publisher) (fl. early 20th century), American sheet-music publisher in Philadelphia
- Joseph Morris (sailor) (born 1989), American sailor
- Joseph Acton Morris (1901–1987), English geographer and school teacher
- Joseph B. Morris (born 1916/1917), American businessman whose business ventures with Bernard Garrett were dramatized in the 2020 film The Banker

== See also ==
- Joe Morris (disambiguation)
