= AfriMusic Song Contest =

Panafrican song contest

- AfriMusic Song Contest logo
- Dates: August–April
- Location: Africa
- Years active: 2018–present
- Founders: Michelle Fernandes Suzie Vicente Victor Nunes
- Website: afrimusicsongcontest.com

The AfriMusic Song Contest is a pan-African song contest inspired by the Eurovision Song Contest. It was first held in 2018, when Eswatini won with singer songwriter Symphony performing her original song "Sengikhona". The second edition of the event in 2019 was won by singer songwriter, Nonzwakazi from South Africa with her original song "Phakama Mbokodo". In 2020, Nigeria took the win with singer songwriter Dhortune That OndoBoy, with his original song "Yemi". The contest will continue as an annual event, acting as an African counterpart to the continental song contests such as Eurovision Song Contest, ABU Song Festivals or Caribbean Song Festival. The contest runs on digital platforms, opening entries to all songwriters and artists across all 54 countries in Africa.

== History ==
Prior to the launch of AfriMusic Song Contest, several unrelated unsuccessful attempts to start a song competition involving countries of African continent took place, including:

- Song of Africa – was planned to be held on May 25, 2011, in Johannesburg, South Africa as the European Broadcasting Union licensed version of the Eurovision Song Contest with the participation of nine to ten countries of the Sub-Saharan Africa. The overall contest cost was estimated between 15 and 20 million South African rand ($1.7–2.3 million) with the final deal for the license priced "some hundred thousand" US dollars yet to be signed, which was called by the organizing team in face of Brenda Sakellarides at the moment of the announcement in May 2009 a financial challenge to put together.
- Africa Song / Le Chant de l'Afrique – was due to take place in December 2014, organized by Africa Song Holdings Limited legally registered in Mauritius with the key personnel from South Africa. It was planned that each participating country would hold a national competition to select a song to represent them. The final was supposed to be a state-of-the-art, world class television production, consisting of live televised performances of each countries' selected song. Nine countries were believed to confirm their participation: Benin, Burundi, DR Congo, Ghana, Madagascar, Nigeria, Republic of the Congo, Rwanda and Zambia with private television station Muvi TV, with ten further expressing initial interest in the competition. Event was eventually cancelled due to the lack of funding.
- All Africa Song Contest – was due to be hosted in Addis Ababa, Ethiopia in 2015, organized by Kush Communications, London based production company led by Zeinab Badawi. Each country in Africa was supposed to be represented by a singer selected by its Ministry of Culture, and the show was due to contain five heats with entries presented in the form of a pre-recorded video, and the live final. Entries from Botswana, Gambia, Guinea-Bissau, Malawi, Rwanda, Somalia, South Sudan and Eswatini were already chosen for the competition that was said to have the backing of UNESCO, the African Union, and was being sponsored by Coca-Cola at this initial stage.

Arab states from Africa have the opportunity to take part in ASBU organized Arab Song Festival that was hosted at its headquarters in Tunis biennially since 2001 to 2013, and which was planned to revive in 2019. In 2008 the EBU has announced signing a deal to license the Eurovision Song Contest format to Nibras Media company from Riyadh, Saudi Arabia that was supposed to produce in partnership with Tanweer Group from Dubai, UAE, a Eurovision equivalent for the MENA region called Arabian Vision with a participation of eight or nine broadcasters, which was not established since.

Algeria, Egypt, Libya, Morocco and Tunisia currently have broadcasters – Members of the European Broadcasting Union, which makes them eligible for the Eurovision Song Contest, like with the participation of Morocco competing in Eurovision 1980, while artists from Benin, Sudan, Tunisia and Zambia have taken part in various ABU Song Festivals as African Union of Broadcasting invited acts.

== Winners by year ==
In three competitions, only representatives from three countries won: these are Eswatini, South Africa and Nigeria. The table below shows the announcement dates of the winners.

Year	Dates	Host city	Entries		Winner	Song	Performer	Language	Points
Year	Dates	Host city	Songs	Countries	Winner	Song	Performer	Language	Points
2018	29 March	Online only	19	19	Eswatini	"Sengikhona"	Symphony	siSwati, English	10
2019	12 April	Online only	20	10	South Africa	"Phakama Mbokodo"	Nonzwakazi	isiZulu, English	10
2020	27 April	Online only	28	24	Nigeria	"Yèmi"	Dhortune ThatOndoBoy	Yoruba, English	6.5

=== Winners by country ===
Wins	Country	Years
1	Eswatini	2018
1	South Africa	2019
1	Nigeria	2020

== Organizers ==
Organizing team of the event, AfriMusic Executive Body [EXCO], includes: Co-founder and Co-CEO Michelle Fernandes (who has prior experience of working on some of Africa's largest events such as the South African Music Awards (SAMAs), SA Sport Awards, MTV Africa Music Awards (MAMAs), Namibian Music Awards, Zambia Music Awards and others), Co-founder and Co-CEO, Suzie Vicente (who has worked with some of the biggest events globally recognised, such at the Gucci Chime for Change Music Concert in London, the London 2012 Summer Olympics and Paralympic Games, London, Paris and New York Fashion Week, the 2014 Sochi Winter Olympic Games, the 2015 England Rugby World Cup, The 2016 Rio Summer Olympic and Paralympic Games, Coachella Music Festival, Glastonbury Music Festival and others) and West Africa Producer Samuel Moses Opoku-Agyemang (Kwabena Poku).

== Format ==
Launching the event in August 2017, organizers promised it to be "a wonderful integration of musical styles, cultures and ethnicities that reflect the diversity and varying styles within the African continent" and to "provide established and aspiring songwriters the platform to showcase their best work". Aiming primarily to select "Best Song In Africa" and to "Shine the spotlight on the best songwriters in Africa", its declared goal is also establishment of "a platform that will educate, motivate and grow the music industry in Africa through its music room sessions and industry education programs".

The contest runs in five stages:

- Pre-Registration: Interested songwriters or artists need to complete pre-registration forms with their contact details to obtain official regulations (available in English, French and Portuguese languages) and entry submission instructions.
- Entries submission: Complete package of the required documents has to be digitally submitted including: Full track, Vocals only track, Instrumental track, Lyrics sheet, Music video of the song (if available), Professional images and Biography of the artist, Biography of the songwriters, Written consent of both artist and songwriters to the rules of the contest, Clearance letter from the record label (if the artist is signed to any).
- Vetting: The AfriMusic Song Contest EXCO reviews all entered songs to ensure they comply with the contest rules and regulations.
- National or Regional Selections: Competing entries are published on the contest's digital platforms in the form of presentation, lyric or music videos and are judged by the Expert Jury panels and the Public on the Votality platform with a predetermined number of entries from each Country/Region being chosen to qualify to the Final. Each National/Regional Expert Jury formed by AfriMusic EXCO should include 3–4 key members from the music industry of the African Continent and 1 international expert or member of the Eurovision community. While any interested member of the public from any part of the world can vote for any song in any National/Regional Selection, corresponding Expert Jury votes only in its pre-set Region.
- Final: Predetermined number of entries compete in the Final, and are judged in a similar way by one large Expert Jury and the Public. The result of each discipline first is calculated separately: Entry receiving the most Public or Jury votes respectively gets 12 points, second most – 10 points, third – 8 points etc., ninth-rated entry gets 2 points and all entries ranked ten and below – 1 point, which makes infamous nul points impossible in AfriMusic. An average from the Jury voting score and Public voting score is then calculated to determine the Winner. In case of a tie, public voting takes precedence. Votes are audited by an independent auditing firm.

== Eligibility ==
Eligible entries are original songs which have not been commercially released or published with a maximum duration of 4.5 minutes. Performing artist must be at least 18 years of age and be citizen or permanent resident in the participating country (any of 54 sovereign countries of Africa or partially recognized Western Sahara, not depending on African Union of Broadcasting membership). If born in another country and qualifies for dual citizenship, an artist may enter the competition representing a country of family origin. Each songwriter can enter up to 3 songs. No lyrics of political nature, unacceptable language or messages promoting any organization or institution are allowed.

== AfriMusic Song Contest 2018 ==
AfriMusic Song Contest 2018

Date and venue
- Final: 15–29 March 2018

Participants
- Number of entries: National Selections: 82 songs by 45 artists from 19 countries Final: 19 songs by 19 artists from 19 countries
- Debuting countries: see list of the participating countries
- Participation map: Participating countries

Vote
- Voting system: An average is calculated from the Expert Jury and Public votes, which award sets of 12–11–10...2 points to their 11 favourite songs, with songs ranked 12–19 receiving 1 point.
- Winning song: Eswatini; Symphony – "Sengikhona"

Pre-registration phase for the 2018 event took place from 3 August to 3 October 2017 and the first country to enter the competition was Rwanda. Entry submission period run from 1 November 2017 to 5 January 2018.

=== Participating countries ===
In its first year, 2 950 artists from 41 countries across the continent registered to participate in the contest. Following a vetting process, 81 artists from 19 countries made it through to the National Selections phase. Votes from the general public and the AfriMusic judging panel combined, resulted in the selection of 19 countries, Botswana, Cameroon, Central African Republic, Côte d’Ivoire, DRC, Egypt, Ethiopia, Gabon, Ghana, Guinea, Mozambique, Nigeria, Republic of the Congo, South Africa, Eswatini, Tanzania and Zimbabwe to participate in the 2018 AfriMusic Song Contest finals.

Two entries were also received from the US based songwriters, who, according to the rules, had to find African artists to perform their songs. However, after official submission and verification period the number of participating countries dropped down to 19.

With total number of 2 325 459 public votes across all 19 countries, Symphony, a songwriter and singer from the Kingdom of Eswatini, was crowned the very first AfriMusic Song Contest winner, for the year 2018.

Countries, which competed in the 2018 edition:

- Botswana (1)
- Cameroon (11)
- Central African Republic (2)
- Chad (2)
- Côte d'Ivoire (3)
- DR Congo (6)
- Egypt (3)
- Ethiopia (1)
- Gabon (7)
- Ghana (5)
- Guinea (1)
- Mozambique (2)
- Nigeria (6)
- Republic of the Congo (5)
- South Africa (14)
- South Sudan (4)
- Eswatini (2)
- Zimbabwe (4)
- Tanzania (3)

Countries, which submitted pre-registration but did not send valid entries:

- Algeria
- Angola
- Benin
- Burundi
- Guinea-Bissau
- Kenya
- Lesotho
- Liberia
- Libya
- Madagascar
- Malawi
- Mali
- Morocco
- Namibia
- Rwanda
- Senegal
- Sierra Leone
- Somalia
- Sudan
- Togo
- Tunisia
- Uganda
- Zambia

A National Selections phase followed, from 24 January to 1 March 2018, to determine the best entry from each country to proceed to the Final. Out of total of 82 songs by 45 performers, the largest number of entries in a national selection was in South Africa (14), followed by Cameroon (11) and Gabon (7). In Botswana, Ethiopia and Guinea only one entry competed, but it was still subject to Jury and Public evaluation before it could proceed further. In CAR (2), Egypt (3), Mozambique (2), Tanzania (3) and Chad (2) one Artist – several Songs National Selections took place. Finalists were revealed on 15 March, with Final voting running until 29 March.

=== Final ===
Country	Artist	Song	Language	Public points	Jury points	Average points	Place
Eswatini	Symphony	Sengikhona	siSwati, English	11	9	10	1
Cameroon	Ingrid White	Stop	English	6	11	8.5	2
Zimbabwe	Nina Watson	Close To Me	English	3	12	7.5	3
Botswana	Feine	Coloured Skin	English	7	7	7	4
Côte d'Ivoire	CCI Studio Orchestre Meets; D S Cynthia, Fabému, Masta Ricky & Papson D.C.	Juste en peu	French, English	12	1	6.5	5
Gabon	SAN	Saint Graal	French	9	3	6	6
South Africa	Kylie Unsworth	Secondhand Narcotics	English	2	10	6	7
DR Congo	Litho Ngonga	Africa	English	10	1	5.5	8
Chad	Stev'N-T	Sincérité	French	8	1	4.5	9
Egypt	Nadya Shanab	In a Fit of Remorse	English	1	8	4.5	10
Ghana	Erastus	Together	English	5	2	3.5	11
Central African Republic	Hybrid	Wali Ti Mbi	French, Sango	1	6	3.5	12
Mozambique	JayCudz	Mon Amour	Portuguese, French	1	5	3	13
Nigeria	Earl J.	Jesu Me Yo We	English, Yoruba	4	1	2.5	14
Guinea	Exploss	Courbée Courbée	French (Note: Contains occasional words in English)	1	4	2.5	15
South Sudan	Samse Sam	Party Time	English, Arabic, Lingala	1	1	1	16
Republic of the Congo	Emma Feron	Peine et Tristesse	French	1	1	1	17
Ethiopia	Pamfalon	Almeshem	Amharic (Note: Contains quotes of Malcolm X and Tupac Shakur as well as word 'propaganda' in English)	1	1	1	18
Tanzania	Zamangwa	Africa Let Us Celebrate	English	1	1	1	19

=== Jury ===
The 18-member judging panel for the Final was made up of Eurovision Song Contest experts, bloggers and community members; PanAmerican music experts and African music and production experts:

- France – Nisay Samreth – Eurovision-FR.net Editor-in-chief and Community Manager
- South Africa – Roy van der Merwe – AfriMusic 2018 Head of South Africa Selection, ESCCovers Editor-in-chief
- Brazil – Fabiana de Cássia Silva – ESCPedia Editor-in-chief
- Kazakhstan – Andy Mikheev – ESCKAZ Editor-in-chief
- Norway – Morten Thomassen – OGAE Norway President
- Austria – Andreas Blaschke
- Poland – Sebastian Mnich – Destination Eurovision Editor-in-chief
- United Kingdom – Ian Fowell – ESCCovers Journalist
- Liberia – Mouloukou Souleymane Kourouma – ANSO Music, Smart Event Producer, East & West Africa
- South Africa – Victor Nunes – Songwriter, AfriMusic Co-founder, Southern Africa
- Canada – Anthony Lopez Berardinelli (Tony KuKo) – PanAmerican Song Contest Producer
- Dominica – Melinda 'Mel-c' Ulysses – Caribbean Artist
- Ghana – Afeafa Nfojoh – GHOne TV Programmes Manager
- Ghana – George Britton – Talent Manager and Entertainment Critic, West Africa
- Ghana – Caroline Sampson – TV & Radio Personality, West Africa
- Ghana – Samuel Moses Opoku-Agyemang – AfriMusic Producer, Events and Media Marketing Specialist, West Africa
- Ghana – Sammy B – TV & Radio Personality, former housemate of Big Brother Africa, West Africa
- Angola – Jorge Henriques – Music Producer, Southern Africa

=== Winners ===
Two winners of the special prizes were announced:

- Prix de la Francophonie (Best French Lyrics Award): Stev'N-T (Chad) – "Sincérité"
- Best English Lyrics Award: Symphony (Eswatini) – "Sengikhona"

Representative of Eswatini Zanele 'Symphony' Cele with the self-written song "Sengikhona" (performed in siSwati and English and translated as "I Am Here") was declared overall winner of the contest on 30 March with full results of the contest revealed on 31 March. Interestingly, "Sengikhona" was the last entry, submitted to the contest prior the deadline on January 5, 2018.

As part of the prize, Symphony was invited to attend Eurovision Song Contest 2018 in Lisbon, Portugal. Official send off event was hosted by the Minister of Sports, Culture and Youth Affairs of Eswatini David Ngcamphalala. During the Eurovision week in Lisbon, Symphony made appearances in the official venues of competition: Euroclub and Eurovision Village. In the Ministerium club Symphony performed selection of her songs including a duet with 4-times Eurovision participant Valentina Monetta, and was also able to meet & greet future Eurovision 2018 winner Netta Barzilai. On the day of the Eurovision Grand Final, Symphony performed on Praça do Comércio in front of 20,000 people in the concert broadcast live by the Portuguese broadcaster RTP, which has also featured the Official Winners Award ceremony for the AfriMusic 2018.

== AfriMusic Song Contest 2019 ==
AfriMusic Song Contest 2019

Date and venue
- Final: 29 March – 12 April 2019

Participants
- Number of entries: Regional Selections: 49 songs by 45 artists from 13 countries Final: 20 songs by 20 artists from 10 countries
- Debuting countries: Malawi; Rwanda; Senegal; Zambia
- Non-returning countries: Botswana; CAR; Chad; DR Congo; Egypt; Ethiopia; Gabon; Guinea; Tanzania; Zimbabwe
- Participation map: Participating countries Did not qualify to the final

Vote
- Voting system: An average is calculated from the Expert Jury and Public votes, which award sets of 12–10–8...2 points to their 9 favourite songs, with songs ranked 10–20 receiving 1 point.
- Winning song: South Africa; Nonzwakazi – "Phakama Mbokodo"

Earlier plans for 2019 included hosting a live show in the Kingdom of Eswatini, however, eventually winning country has dropped from the hosting duties. Acting as brand ambassador, last year's winner Symphony has recorded several promotional videos inviting to apply and vote in the competition. Pre-registration phase was open from 1 September till 13 October 2018, the entry submission period ran from December 1, 2018, until February 17, 2019.

=== Participating countries ===
The participating countries were listed on AfriMusic Song Contest's official website on 11 March 2019, alongside the start of the National Selections process, with the number of pre-registering countries not announced this year. 3 502 entries were received from artists across 16 African countries, namely South Africa, Zambia, Cameroon, Côte d’Ivoire, Ghana, Nigeria, Mozambique, The Kingdom of eSwatini, Botswana, Congo, Liberia, Malawi, Rwanda, Senegal, South Sudan and Togo, no entries were received from the Central African Republic, Chad, DR Congo, Egypt, Ethiopia, Gabon, Guinea, Tanzania and Zimbabwe. 13 of the 16 countries saw 49 qualifying songs through to the National Selections round. The competition was joined by Liberia, Malawi, Rwanda, Senegal, Togo and Zambia. Entries from 13 countries were verified and allowed to proceed, with entries from Togo, Liberia and Botswana failing the process. Out of 49 entries by 45 performers the largest number of entries came from Ghana (16) and South Africa (10).

Following 714,810 number of votes from fans across the continent, 20 contestants made it to the Final round of the contest, representing South Africa, Zambia, Kingdom of eSwatini, Rwanda, Malawi, Ghana, Nigeria, Mozambique, Cameroon and Côte d’Ivoire.

A total number of 2 651 162 general public votes and judging panel combined across 13 countries, saw the undiscovered Afropop songwriter and singer, Nonzwakazi representing South Africa, take the 2019 AfriMusic Song Contest title.

In a change compared to 2018 edition, not all countries were automatically guaranteed participation in the Final: 13 countries were split into three Country Groups with a number of entries from each Country Group to progress to the Final. Regional Selections voting took place from 11 to 25 March 2019. Intermediate Public voting results were released on 18 and 22 March.

Western Region (10)	Central/Eastern Region (2)	Southern Region (8)
Cameroon (3); Côte d'Ivoire (1); Ghana (16); Nigeria (6); Senegal (2)	Malawi (1); Republic of the Congo (1); Rwanda (1); South Sudan (1)	Eswatini (3); Mozambique (3); South Africa (10); Zambia (1)

20 entries representing 10 countries chosen by Public and Expert Panels to compete in the Final were announced on 27 March 2019. Ghana was represented by five acts in the final, followed by South Africa with four entries, Nigeria with three, Eswatini with two and Cameroon, Côte d'Ivoire, Rwanda and Zambia with one each. Republic of the Congo, Senegal, South Sudan were eliminated in the Regional Selection process. Final voting run between 29 March and 12 April 2019. Intermediate Public voting results were revealed on 2 and 8 April 2019

=== Final ===
Country	Artist	Song	Language	Public points	Jury points	Average points	Place
South Africa	Nonzwakazi	Phakama Mbokodo	isiZulu, English	8	12	10	1
Mozambique	Jay Arghh A.K.A J'R	Carlitos	Portuguese	10	5	7.5	2
Zambia	Towela Kaira	Gold	English	4	10	7	3
Ghana	SSUE	Hypnotize	English	12	1	6.5	4
South Africa	Linda Kilian	I Will Never Fight Again	English	5	6	5.5	5
Ghana	Siboat	Always and Forever	English	7	3	5	6
Nigeria	Easrel	Fun Won Tan	English, Yoruba	1	8	4.5	7
Rwanda	Serge Iyamuremye	Ndakubaha	Kinyarwanda	1	7	4	8
Ghana	Da Saama	Cross Road	English (Note: Contains backing vocal bridge in Yoruba)	6	1	3.5	9
South Africa	Mellow	Ho Tlaba Jwang	English, Sotho	3	2	2.5	10
Eswatini	Amanda Mo	Uwami	siSwati (Note: Contains occasional words in English)	1	4	2.5	11
Ghana	Efe Keyz	Juju	English, Pidgin English, Twi	2	1	1.5	12
Nigeria	Laz B	Oleburuku	English, Pidgin English, Igbo, Yoruba	1	1	1	13
Ghana	Dee Tutu	Thunder Fire	English, Pidgin English	1	1	1	14
Eswatini	Miss Trophy	Ngik'tsandzile	siSwati	1	1	1	15
Côte d'Ivoire	DS Cynthia	Merci	French	1	1	1	16
South Africa	Kelstar	Can We Go Back	English	1	1	1	17
Nigeria	Alvan Morris	Dancehall on Fire	English	1	1	1	18
Cameroon	Joahn Lover	Game Over	French, English	1	1	1	19
Malawi	Mungo	Come Thru	English	1	1	1	20

=== Jury ===
The 10-member judging panel for the Final was made up of Eurovision Song Contest experts; PanAmerican music experts and African music and production experts. Six of them have already served in the judging panel in 2018 edition of the contest.

- Kazakhstan – Andy Mikheev – ESCKAZ Editor-in-chief
- Ghana – Nii Atakora Mensah – GhanaMusic.com Head of Content Development
- South Africa – Roy van der Merwe – ESCCovers Editor-in-chief, Eurovision South Africa President
- South Africa – Victor Nunes – Songwriter, AfriMusic Co-founder
- Ghana – Ameyaw Debrah – Entertainment Blogger
- France – Nisay Samreth – Eurovision-FR.net Editor-in-chief and Community Manager
- South Africa – Promise Motshele – Sound Engineer & Events Marketing Manager
- San Marino – Valentina Monetta – Four times Eurovision Song Contest participant
- Canada – Anthony Lopez Berardinelli (Tony KuKo) – Entertainment Blogger, PanAmerican Song Contest Producer
- Liberia – Mouloukou Souleymane Kourouma (Anso) – Music Label CEO & Producer

=== Returning artists ===
Singer from Côte d'Ivoire DS Cynthia has competed in AfriMusic final 2018 as part of the project CCI Studio Orchestre Meets DS Cynthia, Fabému, Masta Ricky & Papson D.C. and had a solo entry Jes Suis in the National Selection round as well.

=== Winners ===
Winners of the four special Recognition Awards were announced on 10 April 2019:

- Best English Lyrics: Siboat (Ghana) – "Always and Forever"
- Best French Lyrics: Joahn Lover (Cameroon) – "Game Over"
- Best African Language Song: Nonzwakazi (South Africa) – "Phakama Mbokodo"
- Most International Song (Song most likely to be covered in another language): songwriters Ylva & Linda Persson (Sweden) – "I Will Never Fight Again" (performed by Linda Kilian (South Africa))

Representative of South Africa Siphokazi 'Nonzwakazi' Maphumulo with the self-written song "Phakama Mbokodo" was announced as the overall winner of AfriMusic Song Contest 2019 on 15 April. The song is performed in isiZulu and English languages and translated as "Rise Woman" with 'mbokodo' literally meaning 'rock' – a reference to the line of the freedom song sang at 1956 Women's March in South Africa "you strike the women, you strike a rock". As part of the prize, Nonzwakazi was invited to attend Eurovision Song Contest 2019 in Tel Aviv, Israel and to perform there at the official venue of the contest – Eurovision Village in Charles Clore Park on the Grand Final day 18 May 2019.

Nonzwakazi's performance at the EuroVision Village, attracted 105,000 EuroVision fans and spectators. Nonzwakazi performed her winning song Phakama Mbokodo, and two other original songs live on stage. The AfriMusic Song Contest organisers held an official presentation in honour of Nonzwakazi's AfriMusic Song Contest win, where she received her AfriMusic Song Contest 2019 Statuette, to commemorate her win.

== AfriMusic Song Contest 2020 ==
AfriMusic Song Contest 2020

Date and venue
- Final: 10–27 April 2020

Participants
- Number of entries: Regional Selections: 113 songs by artists from 24 countries Final: 30 songs by 30 artists from 15 countries
- Debuting countries: Burundi; Equatorial Guinea; Kenya; Liberia; Morocco; Namibia; Tunisia; Uganda
- Returning countries: DR Congo; Gabon; Tanzania; Zimbabwe
- Non-returning countries: Rwanda

Vote
- Voting system: An average is calculated from the Expert Jury and Public votes, which award sets of 12–10–8...2 points to their 9 favourite songs, with songs ranked 10–20 receiving 1 point.
- Winning song: Nigeria; Dhortune ThatOndoBoy – "Yemi"

Immediately after South Africa's victory in the AfriMusic Song Contest 2019, organizers announced to be "working hard to introduce a live show to the contest and have a live South African Finals show" for the 2020 edition. The song submission period closed on 1 February 2020, with the regional selection period beginning on 20 February. 113 songs from 24 countries are in contention for a spot in the final, an increase of 64 competing songs and 11 countries from the year before. Among them, the highest number of songs came from Ghana (18), Nigeria (20), and South Africa (19). Burundi, Equatorial Guinea, Kenya, Liberia, Morocco, Namibia, Tunisia, and Uganda all submitted eligible competitors for the first time, while the Democratic Republic of the Congo, Gabon, Tanzania, and Zimbabwe returned after a year's absence. The winning song was revealed on 27 April 2020.

=== Final ===
Country	Artist	Song	Language	Public Points	Jury Points	Average Points	Place
Burundi	Miss Erica	In My Heart	English, French, Kirundi	1	7	4	9
Kenya	Crank	Cause You're Mine	English	8	1	4.5	5
Kenya	Otis Jela	Yako	Shona	1	1	1	29
South Sudan	Yuppie Jay	Bubble It	English, Hausa	1	1	1	30
Tanzania	Voice Prince	Nakupenda	Swahili	1	1	1	28
Uganda	Frank Magic	Sibiwulira	Chichewa	2	1	1.5	17
Cote d'Ivoire	Leflo Gnezale	Reste	French	1	1	1	20
Ghana	EpiqMenz	Downtown Guy	English	10	1	5.5	3
Ghana	Efe Keyz	Feelings	English	1	1	1	27
Nigeria	Ayuba Tete	Hope Song	English	1	5	3	12
Nigeria	Dhortune ThatOndoBoy	Yemi	English, Yoruba	12	1	6.5	1
Nigeria	Dr Philz	Butter	English, Swahili, Yoruba	5	1	3	11
Nigeria	Zinny	Little Girls Grow	English	1	12	6.5	2
Cameroon	Epiesco	Nga Di Scream	French	1	1	1	18
Cameroon	Joahn Lover	Ticket Valide	French	1	1	1	26
Cameroon	Liya Yoh	Broken	English	1	1	1	22
DR Congo	Anouchka Tuluka	Na Lela Yo	Zulu	3	1	2	15
DR Congo	Eddy Rug	BlaBlaBla	Somali	1	1	1	24
Tunisia	Hamza Mathcima	Samra	Italian, Somali	7	1	4	7
Malawi	Bamoc	Closed Doors	English	1	8	4.5	6
South Africa	Holly Rey	Fire	English	1	6	3.5	10
South Africa	Jolanda Becker	The Song of Hope	English	1	3	2	16
South Africa	Kenton Lee	Echo	English	1	1	1	21
South Africa	Leote Taylor	Everybody	English	6	2	4	8
South Africa	LusiBlaq	Emlanjeni	Xhosa	1	1	1	23
South Africa	Mandiamakhulu	Vukani	Zulu	1	1	1	19
South Africa	Presss	African Child	English	1	10	5.5	4
South Africa	Thato Kashe	Ndimilona	Xhosa	1	1	1	25
Zambia	Waina	Norita	Chichewa	1	4	2.5	14
Zimbabwe	Simple Claude	Marunjeya	Chichewa	4	1	2.5	13

Eastern Africa	Western Africa	Central & Northern Africa	Southern Africa
Burundi (1); Kenya (5); South Sudan (2); Tanzania (1); Uganda (5)	Côte d'Ivoire (2); Gabon (1); Ghana (18); Liberia (1); Nigeria (20); Senegal (2)	Cameroon (3); DR Congo (4); Republic of the Congo (1); Equatorial Guinea (1); Morocco (2); Tunisia (1)	Eswatini (1); Malawi (4); Mozambique (1); Namibia (2); South Africa (19); Zambia (9); Zimbabwe (7)

=== Winners ===
Winners of the four special Recognition Awards were announced on 23 April 2020:

- Best English Lyrics: Zinny (Nigeria) – "Little Girls Grow"
- Best French Lyrics: Miss Erica (Burundi) – "In My Heart"
- Best African Language Song: Hamza Mathcima (Tunisia) – "Samra"
- EurovisionCoverage Facebook Buzz Award: Miss Erica (Burundi) – "In My Heart"

== Participation ==
Table key

Withdrawn – Countries who have participated in the past but have withdrawn.

Country	Debuting year	Withdrawing year	Returning year	Number of entries in final	Wins
Botswana	2018	2019		1	
Burundi	2020			1	
Cameroon	2018			5	
Central African Republic	2018	2019		1	
Chad	2018	2019		1	
DR Congo	2018	2019	2020	3	
Egypt	2018	2019		1	
Equatorial Guinea	2020			0^{[d]}	
Eswatini	2018			3^{[d]}	1
Ethiopia	2018	2019		1	
Gabon	2018	2019	2020	1^{[d]}	
Ghana	2018			8	
Guinea	2018	2019		1	
Cote d'Ivoire	2018			3	
Kenya	2020			2	
Liberia	2020			0^{[d]}	
Malawi	2019			2	
Morocco	2020			0^{[d]}	
Mozambique	2018			2^{[d]}	
Namibia	2020			0^{[d]}	
Nigeria	2018			8	1
Republic of the Congo	2018			1^{[c]}	
Rwanda	2019	2020		1	
Senegal	2019			0^{[a]}	
South Africa	2018			13	1
South Sudan	2018			2^{[b]}	
Tanzania	2018	2019	2020	2	
Tunisia	2020			1	
Uganda	2020			1	
Zambia	2019			2	
Zimbabwe	2018	2019	2020	2	

=== Other countries ===
The following list of countries are eligible to participate in the AfriMusic Song Contest, but so far have yet to make their debut appearance.

- Algeria
- Angola
- Benin
- Burkina Faso
- Cape Verde
- Comoros
- Djibouti
- Eritrea
- Gambia
- Guinea-Bissau
- Lesotho
- Libya
- Madagascar
- Mali
- Mauritania
- Mauritius
- Niger
- São Tomé and Príncipe
- Seychelles
- Sierra Leone
- Somalia
- Sudan
- Togo

== See also ==
- Eurovision Song Contest
- ABU Song Festivals
- All For One Caribbean
- Caribbean Song Festival
- OTI Festival
- Voice of Asia
- Intervision Song Contest
- Island Africa Talent

== Notes and references ==
=== Notes ===
1. Senegal participated in 2019 and 2020, but did not qualify for the final in either year.
2. South Sudan participated in 2019, but did not qualify for the final.
3. Republic of the Congo had participated in 2019 and 2020, but did not qualify for the final.
4. Participated in 2020, but was not selected for the final.
