= Idrissa Camara =

Idrissa Camara may refer to:

- Idrissa Camara (dancer), Guinean dancer and choreographer
- Idrissa Camará (born 1992), Bissau-Guinean football winger
- Idrissa Camara (footballer) (born 1998), Senegalese football winger
