= Joseph W. Morris (educator) =

American lawyer

- Born: August 26, 1850; Charleston, South Carolina
- Died: July 13, 1913 (aged 62); Columbia, South Carolina
- Occupations: Lawyer, Professor
- Political party: Republican

Joseph W. Morris (August 26, 1850 - September 13, 1913) was an African-American lawyer and professor in South Carolina. He was principal of Allen University in the 1880s and 1890s.

== Biography and career ==
Joseph W. Morris was born in Charleston, South Carolina of free parents, John B. Morris and Grace Morris. He attended private school in Charleston taught by Simeon Beard, and after the US Civil War, attended public schools there. As a student, he worked in printing in the afternoons for R. Bruce Elliot at the Charleston Leader, and then with Richard H. Cain at the Missionary Record. At the Normal school of Charleston, one of his teachers was Francis Lewis Cardozo. In 1868, he enrolled at Howard University and graduated in June 1875. That fall he returned to South Carolina, enrolling in the law school at South Carolina University in Columbia, South Carolina. Franklin J. Moses, Sr., then chief justice of the South Carolina Supreme Court, gave Morris financial support and was one of his teachers and mentors in law school. In 1876, he was elected commissioner of public schools in Charleston and was nominated for state legislature, but declined both to finish his studies. Morris graduated with distinction in December 1876. He passed the South Carolina bar and began practicing law.

He worked in law for a very short time before becoming principal of Payne Institute. He held this position for four years until it was merged into Allen University in 1880. At Allen University, he served as professor of mathematics and ancient language, instructor of the Normal and Preparatory department, and secretary and instructor of the law department. February 14, 1884, Morris married Lizzy Perry at the AME Church in Georgetown, South Carolina. In 1885 he was elected president of Allen University. In the 1890 gubernatorial election, Morris led a group of black Republicans who endorsed Democrat Alexander Cheves Haskell for governor in a campaign that did not include a Republican. Haskell's opponent, Ben Tillman, sought to disenfranchise blacks in the state, and many white Republicans supported Haskell, but other black Republicans disagreed with Morris and opposed both Tillman and Haskell because Haskell had been involved in suppressing black votes in the 1876 gubernatorial election.

In 1893 he was appointed honorary vice president of the educational department of the 1893 Columbian Exposition in Chicago by the United States Commission of Education. He held the position of president of the University at least until 1895 and was vice president in the 1900s. Morris died Saturday, September 13, 1913 in Columbia, South Carolina. Williams was a member of the African Methodist Episcopal Church.
