= Mozambique (music) =

Mozambique refers to two separate styles of music.

== Cuban-style mozambique ==
Mozambique (pron.: mo.sam.'βi.ke) is a vigorous style of Cuban music and dance derived, like the conga, from music of Cuban street carnivals or comparsas. It was invented or developed by Pello el Afrokan (Pedro Izquierdo) in 1963.

=== Music ===
Although the rhythm shares many characteristics with Sub-Saharan African music traditions, it does not have anything to do with music from the African nation of Mozambique. The Cuban mozambique features conga drums, bombos (bass drums), cowbells and trombones. [See: "Mozambique Lesson in Cuba, 1985" (Pello el Afrokan), and "Mozambique Rhythm from Cuba" (Kim Atkinson). Izquierdo's composition "María Caracoles" was later recorded by Santana on their 1977 album Festival.

Izquierdo's rhythm made its début in 1963 in Havana on the television programme Ritmos de Juventud, with the presenter surrounded by drummers so in tune with each other that they created a piano-like sound, while simultaneously performing the Mozambique dance.

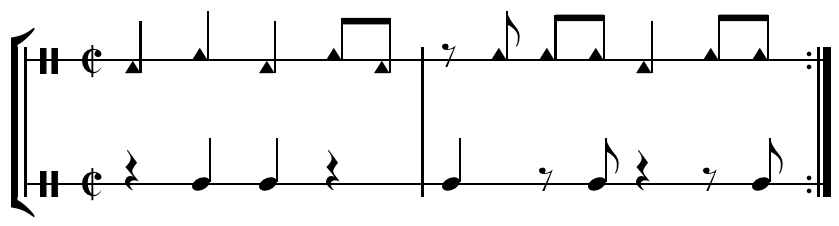
Cuban-style Mozambique bell pattern above rumba clave in 2-3 clave sequence..

=== Dance ===
The dance consists of bending the knee and lowering the body at the same time as lifting up a foot while returning the body to its normal upright position, continuing to bend the knees, and lowering the body. The dance looks like a cross between the "timeless" Afro-Cuban rumba and son, and the African-American twist, which was popular in the States during the early 1960s.

Mozambique peaked in 1965, when Izquierdo took a group to the Olympics in Paris, then was quickly discarded. Despite its short time in the spotlight, first Izquierdo, and later his son, have kept the mozambique alive through recordings and live performances. Mozambique was the first new genre of post-revolution Cuba, and the first popular band music to systemically use rumba clave. The mozambique began a new trajectory in band rhythms, which can be heard in its descendants—songo and timba.

== New York–style mozambique ==
In New York City during the 1960s, Eddie Palmieri created a rhythm called Mozambique that was inspired by Izquierdo's creation of the same name. Although both rhythms are based on conga de comparsa drums, they have no parts in common. [See: "The History of the New York–Style Mozambique" (Andy Gonzalez interviews Manny Oquendo).] Even the clave patterns are different; Izquierdo's rhythm uses rumba clave, while Palmieri's uses son clave. Izquierdo’s mozambiques are, for the most part, in major keys. Palmieri’s mozambiques are mostly in minor keys. However, both groups primarily use chord progressions in a 2-3 clave sequence, and a trombone horn section.

The following piano guajeo is in the New York style.

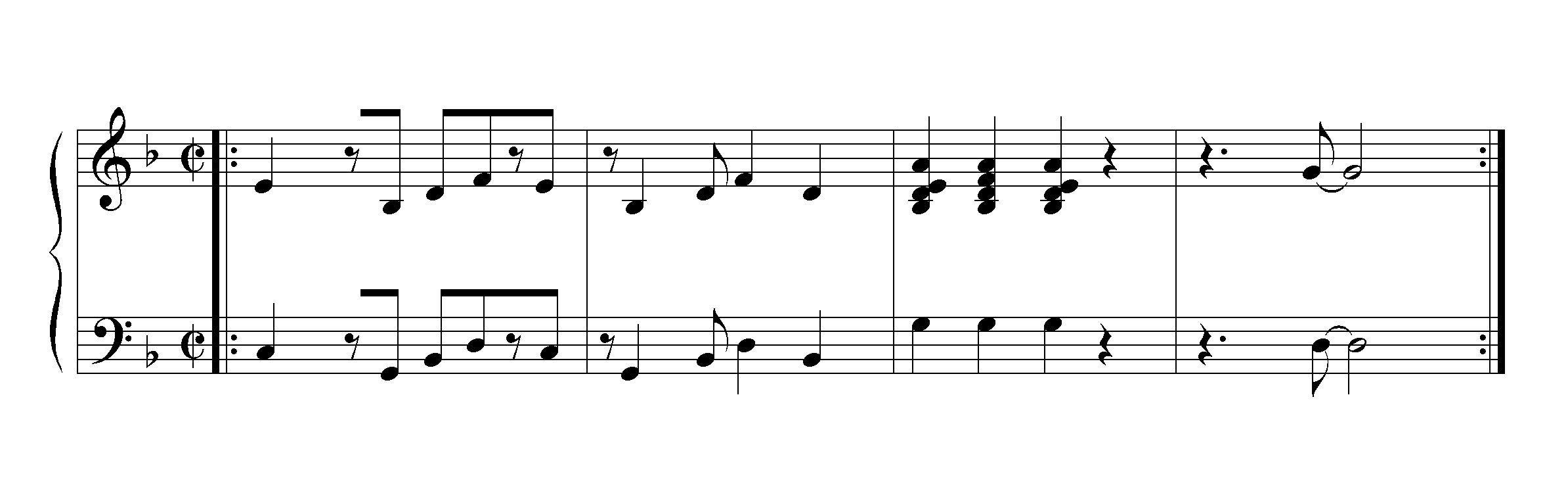
NY-style 2-3 piano guajeo by Rebeca Mauleón.

Rebeca Mauleón makes the point that because Cuban Mozambique originally began as a percussion genre, there is no set piano part for it. By contrast, while Izquierdo created specific percussion parts for his Mozambique, the only specific percussion part in the New York style is the bell pattern.

=== Bell pattern ===
The bell pattern used in Palmieri's rhythm was originally a guaguancó cáscara pattern. The Mozambique bell is similar to the pattern used in Havana-style conga de comparsa.

Tommy Lopez played congas in Palmieri's group. The bell pattern was first played by Palmieri's timbalero Julito Collazo and later by Manny Oquendo, who came to be closely associated with the Mozambique timbales part. [See: "Mozambique" (Manny Oquendo).] The NY Mozambique bell was later adopted by drumset players in North American jazz and popular music. For example, drummer Steve Gadd can be heard playing the NY Mozambique bell part on drumset (cymbal) during Paul Simon's song "Late in the Evening".

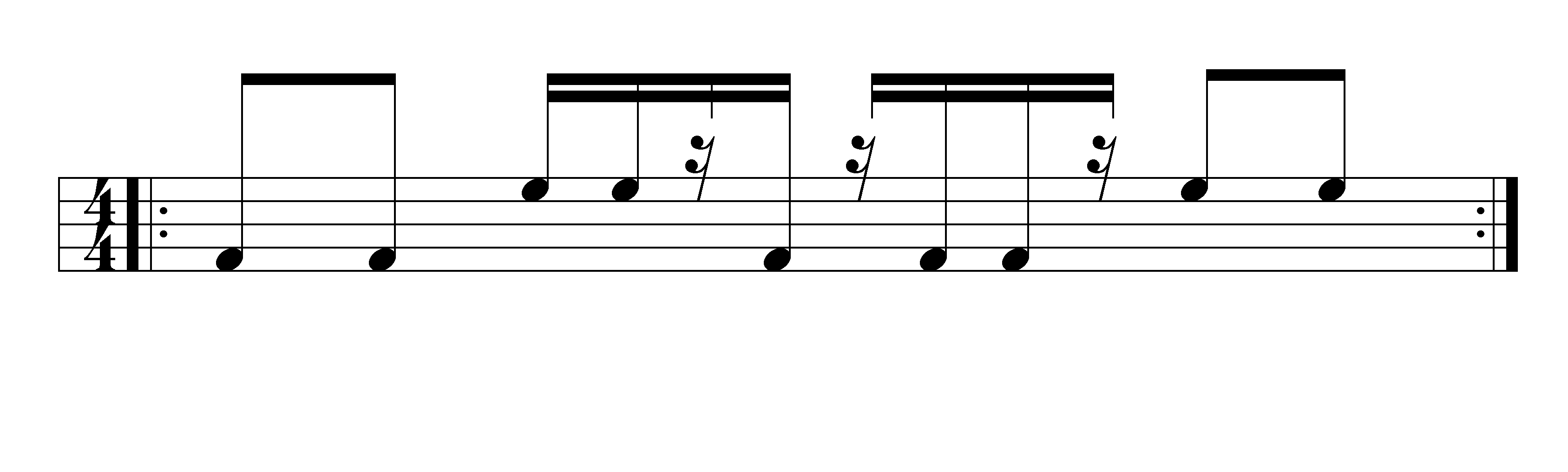
Bell pattern for Havana-style conga de comparsa, written in 2-3 clave sequence.

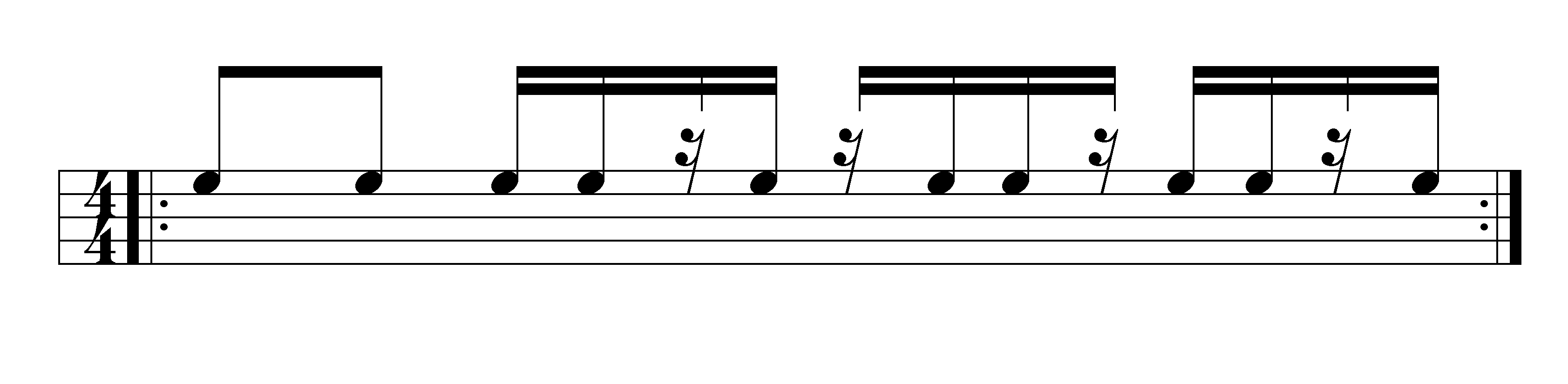
NY-style Mozambique bell pattern in 2-3 clave.

The NY Mozambique bell is nearly identical to the basic songo stick pattern. [See: "Basic Songo for Drum Kit" (Ignacio Berroa). The only difference is the stroke on main beat 3, sounded in the songo pattern. Both songo and NY Mozambique departed from the typical "angular" rhythms used in son montuno, mambo, and salsa, allowing more improvisational freedom for the conga drummer throughout the song.

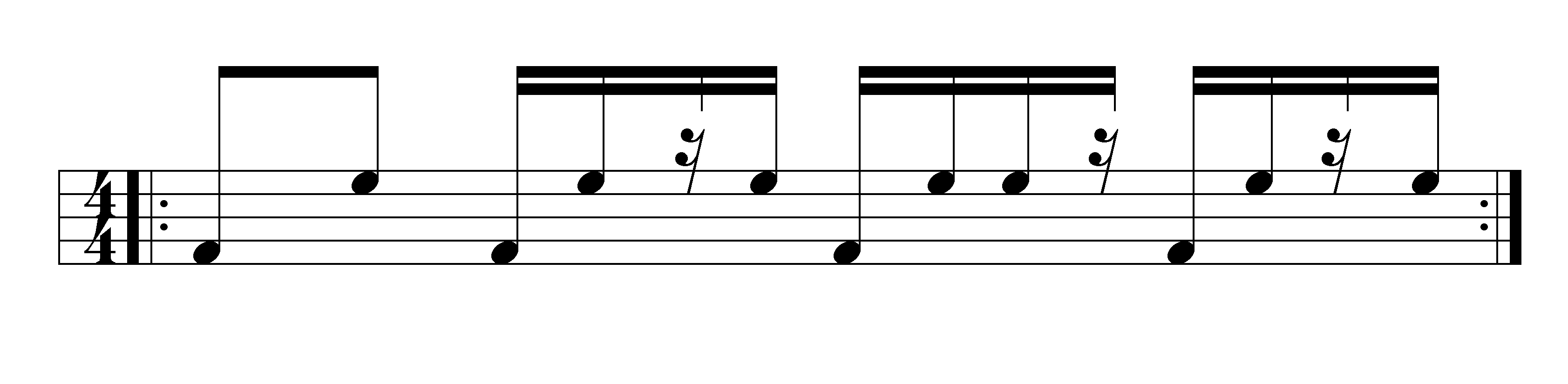
Basic songo stick pattern in 2-3 clave.
