= Eyuphuro =

Mozambican band

- Origin: Mozambique
- Genres: Marrabenta
- Years active: 1981–1991, 2001–present
- Labels: Real World Records
- Members: Firmina Louis Hunguana; Issufo Manuel; Belarmino Rita Godeiros; Jorge Cossa; Mahamudo Selimane
- Past members: Zena Bacar; Omar Issa; Gimo Remane
- Website: realworldrecords.com/artist/384/eyuphuro/

Eyuphuro is a Mozambican band. Eyuphuro's music is a combination of traditional African music and western popular music. Eyuphuro's music is sung mostly in Makua, a Bantu language. The name of the band means "whirlwind" in Macua.

== History ==
Omar Issa, Gimo Remane and Zena Bacar founded Eyuphuro in 1981. Eyuphuro released the successful album Mama Mosambiki before its initial breakup in 1990. In 1998, singer Zena Bacar reformed Eyuphuro and in 2001 they released a new album, Yellela. They made three albums over 25 years that were sold around the world, but the band members never saw these profits.

== Original members ==
- Zena Bacar
- Omar Issa
- Gimo Remane

== Current members ==
- Issufo Manuel
- Belarmino Rita Godeiros
- Jorge Cossa
- Mahamudo Selimane
- Firmino Luis Hunguana

The album Yellela also includes musicians who are not members of the band; singer Mariamo Mussa Hohberg, saxophonist Orlando da Conceicao and keyboardist Benedito Mazbuko.

== Discography ==
Albums

- Mama Mosambiki (1990)
- Yellela (2001)

Contributing artist

- Unwired: Africa (2000, World Music Network)
- The Rough Guide to Acoustic Africa (2013, World Music Network)
