= Sat-B =

Burundian musical artist

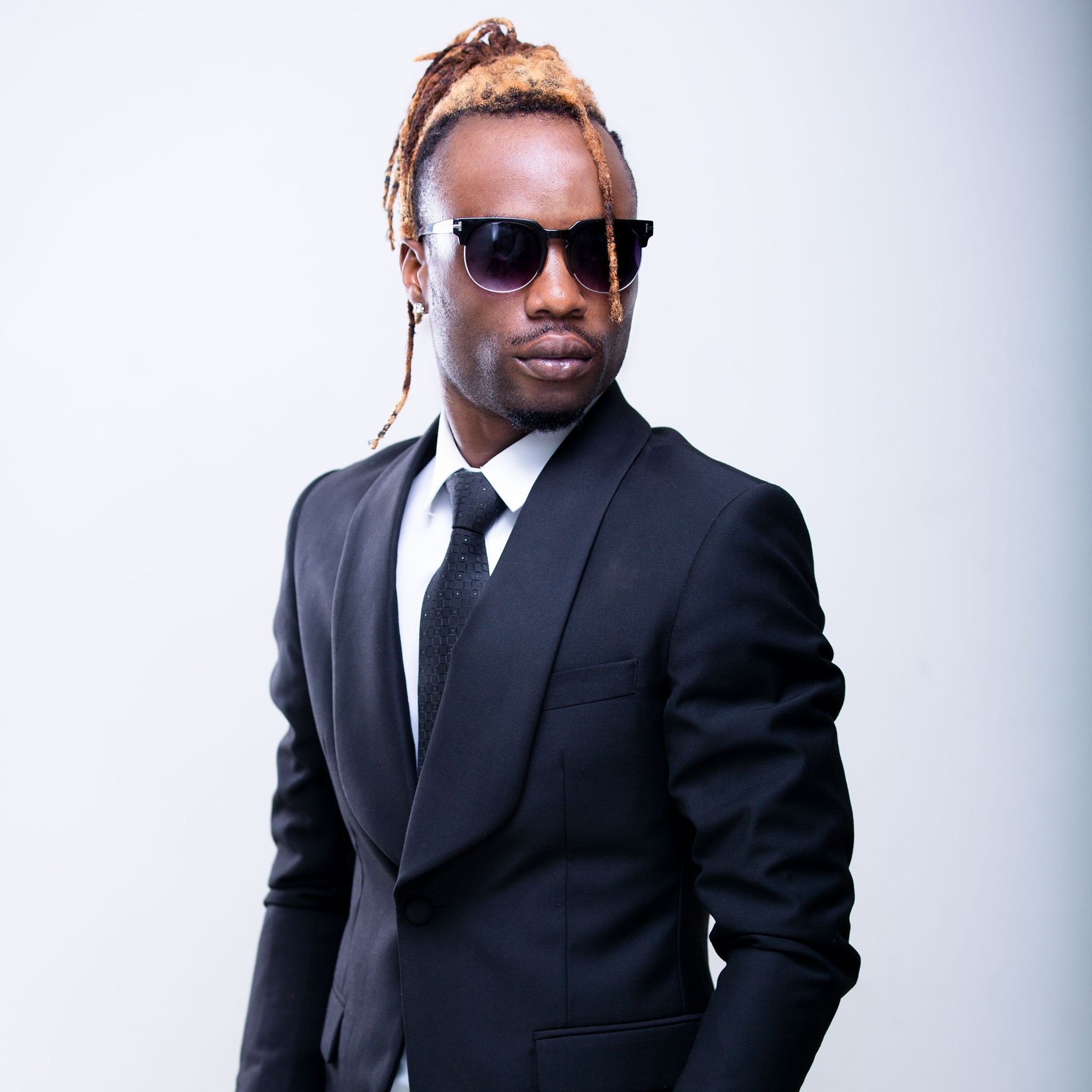

Background information
- Also known as: Sat-B, Satura Amabafle
- Born: Bizimana Aboubakar Karume; 7 December 1989 (age 36); Bujumbura, Burundi
- Genres: Afropop, R&B
- Occupations: Singer-songwriter, performer
- Years active: 2009–present
- Label: Empire Avenue

Bizimana Aboubakar Karume (born 7 December 1989), better known by his stage name SAT-B, is a Burundian musical artist and performer. Sat-B is the CEO of Empire Avenue, a music management label.

== History ==
Sat-B was born and raised in Bujumbura, Burundi.

== Discography ==
=== EP ===
- Romantic Sounds

=== Albums ===
- Inkuru y'Ukuri (2010)
- IWACU (2016)
- Hello Afrika (2022)

=== Singles ===
- "Nyanzobe"
- "Reka Mbege"
- "Simba Hawana Meno"
- "Nyandika"
- "Maisha"
- "Akabeba"
- "Walimwengu"
- "Satura Amabafle"
- "Wezere" featuring Big Fizzo
- "Urankirigita" featuring Urban Boyz
- "Kanitangaze"
- "I Love You" ft Urban Boyz
- "Rwagiye He?"
- "ShimirImana"
- "Ivyo Bintu" ft Magic Washington
- "Feel Love"
- "No Love"
- "Karabarya"
- "Amabuno" ft Best Life Music, Belle 9ice, Bain Turo & Clémentine Kavy
- "Love Controller"
- "Don’t Cry" ft Aslay
- "Umubabaro"
- "Sukamwo"
- "Izina"
- "Gacugere ft Bain Turo"
- "Izina Remix ft Fabelove, Chriss Eazy, AoBeats & Bain Turo"
- "Forgive Me"
- "Huge Me" ft Otile Brown

=== Music videos ===
List of music videos with directors, showing year released
| Title | Year | Director(s) |
|---|---|---|
| "Ikinyamugigima" | 2012 | Hugues Bana & Kent-P |
| "FreeStyle" | 2013 | Kent-P |
| "Nyandika" | 2014 | Camino Rwanda |
| "Satura Amabafle" | 2014 | Kent-P |
| "Impemburo" | 2015 | Kent-P |
| "Generation Moto Moto ft Nizzo Kaboss" | 2015 | Gilbert Benjamins & Kent-P |
| "Nyampinga" | 2016 | Gilbert Benjamins & Kent-P |
| "African Girl" | 2016 | Meddy Menz & Kent-P |
| "I Love You ft Urban Boyz" | 2016 | Grate Pest |
| "Too Much" | 2017 | Kent-P |
| "Ivyo Bintu Ft Magic Washington" | 2017 | Kent-P |
| "Feel Love" | 2017 | Sasha Vybz |
| "No Love" | 2018 | Joowzey |
| "Karabarya" | 2018 | Sasha Vybz |
| "50–100 (Amabuno) ft Best Life Music, Belle 9ice, Clementine Kavy and Bain Turo" | 2019 | Kent-P |
| "Love Controller" | 2019 | Taty Lameck |
| Ndemeye | 2024 | Kent-P |

==== Featuring videos ====
- Katoto Rmx by Dj Pro ft Mkombozi
- Stay With Me by Alida B
- Me & You by Esther Nish
- Only One by Mt Number One ft Sat-B
- Sweet Darling by Bahati ft Sat-B

== Awards ==
Sat-B awards and nominations
Awards and nominations
| Award | Wins | Nominations |
| Afrima | 0 | 1 |
| Top Ten Music Awards | 1 | 0 |
| Radio Achievement | 3 | 0 |
| Ikoh Multiservice | 1 | 0 |
| Buja Music Awards | 3 | 2 |

Totals (Note: Certain award groups do not simply award one winner. They acknowledge several different recipients, have runners-up, and have third place. Since this is a specific recognition and is different from losing an award, runner-up mentions are considered wins in this award tally. For simplification and to avoid errors, each award in this list has been presumed to have had a prior nomination.)
- Wins: 10
- Nominations: 5

=== East Africa Entertainment Awards ===
| Year | Nominee / work | Award | Result |
|---|---|---|---|
| 2022 | Sat-B | Artiste of the year, Burundi | Won |

=== HAPA AWARDS ===
| Year | Nominee / work | Award | Result |
|---|---|---|---|
| 2021 | Sat-B | BEST INDEPENDENT TRADITIONAL MUSIC | Won |

=== Hi Skool Awards ===
| Year | Nominee / work | Award | Result |
|---|---|---|---|
| 2020 | Sat-B | EAST AFRICA'S CHAMPION OF THE YEAR | Nominated |

=== Buja Music Awards ===
| Year | Prize | Work/Recipient | Result |
|---|---|---|---|
| 2019 | Artist of the Year | | Won |
| 2019 | Song of the Year | No Love | Won |
| 2019 | Best Performance | | Nominated |
| 2019 | Best Male Artist | | Won |
| 2019 | Video of the Year | Karabarya directed by Sasha Vybz | Nominated |

=== Afrima ===
| Year | Nominee / work | Award | Result |
|---|---|---|---|
| 2016 | Sat-B | Most Promising Artist | Nominated |

=== Ikoh Multiservice ===
| Year | Nominee / work | Award | Result |
|---|---|---|---|
| 2014 | Sat-B | Artist of the Year | Won |

=== Top Ten Tube Music Awards ===
| Year | Nominee / work | Award | Result |
|---|---|---|---|
| 2013 | Ikinyamugigima | Video of the Year | Won |

=== Radio Achievement ===
| Year | Award Ceremony | Prize | Work/Recipient | Result |
|---|---|---|---|---|
| 2017 | Buja Fm Hits Connection | Song of the month January | Too Much | Won |
| 2017 | RFM | Artist of the Year | Feel Love | Won |
| 2018 | Buja Fm | Song of the Year | No Love | Won |
