= Zena Bacar =

Mozambican singer

Bacar in concert in 2016

Zena Bacar (25 August 1949 - 24 December 2017) was a Mozambican singer, a pioneer in popular music in her country.

== Life ==
Bacar was born a Muslim in Nampula and began her relationship with music by interpreting folkloric themes and dancing in groups mainly composed of men from her village, aged six, and later conquering the fame with which she took her group Eyuphuro to the city of Maputo.

Her first song, entitled "Urera Krera", the same as "Vanity without Judgment" in the language of Camões, was recorded in 1980. She and her group Eyuphuro (meaning 'Whirlpool' in Macua) toured Canada in the late 1980s.

She became a Christian and she gave much of her money to the Universal Church of the Kingdom of God. She and Euphuru made three albums over 25 years that were sold around the world but the band members never saw these profits.

At the end of her life she was poor and she had to ask the church to return her house. She was ill and she was flown home to her home town by the Ministry of Health where she died on Christmas Eve.
