= Mingas =

Mozambican singer

Elisa Domingas Jamisse, better known by her stage name Mingas, is a Mozambican singer. Born in the capital city, Maputo in Mozambique Mingas started to sing at a very early age. Her music is a mixture of Afro sounds that gives prominence to the rhythms of the Chope people of southern Mozambique, and she is one of the most famous singers of Marrabenta. Her career is marked with big hits and collaborations with major African singers like Miriam Makeba, Hugh Masekela, Angélique Kidjo, Baba Maal, Yvonne Chaka Chaka, Jimmy Dludlu, Gilberto Gil, among others.

== Early life and beginning of career ==
She is the fourth of a close-knit family of six children, and developed the passion for music in the church. By the age of 15 she was part of the church choir and by the same time she participates in some music shows in Maputo. With a soft and sweet voice Mingas soon connects with the people and gets a contract to sing in the famous nightclub by the age of 17, 'Sheik'. With some objection by the part of her family, her supportive brother - Max - committed to drive her and look after her during the performances.

By the 70's the country was on the fight for independence, Mingas grew as a singer performing now additional in places like 'Buzios' and 'Zambi' and singing together with popular bands like 'Hokolókwe', 'Africa Power' and João Domingos' band. However, after independence in 1975 life in Mozambique changed a lot with a lot of club owners leaving the country and closing doors.

== The 1980s ==
With almost all the clubs with closed doors Mingas joined up as the lead singer of the band 'Hokolókwe' and, with their music, they toured the country, to the extent possible under the civil war conditions.

The 80's where a difficult period for almost all singers in Mozambique, but later she joins the most famous radio at the time 'Radio Mocambique' and in 1987 she joins 'Orchestra Marrabenta Star de Mozambique'. She becomes one of the female leaders of the group together with Dulce. The group choreographed a program that was presented with considerable success on a tour in Europe in 1987. Mingas' solo performances during the tour included the song 'Ava Sata Va Lomu' and the Marrabenta song 'Elisa Gomara Saya'. She also participated in the group as a dancer and as backing vocal. Orchestra Marrabenta continued their highly successful, international tours in 1988.

Mingas’ inclusion in the Grupo RM in 1989 was a landmark in her musical career which led to recordings in Paris and a Gala show in Guinea Conakry being awarded the ‘Grand Prix Decouvertes 90’. In 1989, she toured Brazil, and in the following years established her legendary status as one of Mozambique’s ‘greats’, touring and performing frequently in Mozambique.

== The 1990s ==
After a decade characterized with difficult period and success, the 90's was a promising way for Mingas. After a success with 'Nweti' Mingas started to focus more in a solo career, and in 1993 she is given the award 'Best Female Singer of 1993', at Ngoma Mozambique, for her performance of her song 'Nwananga'.

From 1995 to 1998, Mingas performed with Miriam Makeba.

In Australia (1995), she had the opportunity to sing in the famed Sidney Opera House. Also included in the Australian tour were Brisbane, Melbourne and Perth. In Rio de Janeiro, Brazil, she participated in Miriam Makeba's concert for Pope John Paul II in 1997. Also in 1997, a tour of western USA and Canada took them to several venues in the states of California, Washington and Oregon and to Victoria and Vancouver in Canada.

== The 2000 decade ==
In 2001, Mingas participated with solo performances in the 'Miriam Makeba Tribute to Dolly Ratebe', which took place at the Mandela Theater (previously known as the Civic Theater) in Johannesburg. Later the same year, she was invited by PJ Powers to perform for Nelson Mandela and Graça Machel at the launch of 'The Mandela Centre of Reconciliation' at the game reserve 'Shambala' in South Africa.

In 2005 she releases the CD 'Vuka Africa'.

She preceded the famous Mozambican Fado singer in 2006, Mariza with an opening Performance. And in the same year she is awarded with 'Ngoma Moçambique', 'Song of the Year' award in 2006 for her song 'Klonipho'.

In 2007 she celebrated 30 years of career with concert in the Centro Cultural Franco-Moçambicano in Maputo.

== Discography ==
Her solo releases include:

- 2005 - Vuka Africa (re-released in 2009)
- 2009 - DVD: Live: Mingas

Other works includes:

- 1988 - Independence (with Orchestra Marrabenta Star de Moçambique)
- 1991 - Cineta (with Amoya)
- 1996 - Piquenique (with Orchestra Marrabenta Star de Moçambique)

== Awards ==
- 2006 - 'Song of the Year' Klonipho
- 1990 - 'Grand Prix Decouvertes 90', together with Chico Antonio and Amoya
- - Best female Singer by Radio Mocambique
- 1989 - 'Best song for 'Nweti'

== Sources ==
- Mingas Website
- Mingas Returns to Zimbabwe, 20 Years Later
- https://mozmusic.blogspot.com/
- Mingas Voz de Ouro (portuguese)
