= Mista Shaw =

Ghanaian musician

- Born: Samuel Shawcross Attah; 1 June 1989 (age 37); Tema, Ghana
- Genres: Hiplife, Afro beat, hip hop
- Occupation: singer/rapper
- Instrument: Vocals
- Years active: (2009–present)

Mista Shaw (born June 1, 1989) is a Ghanaian musician known for his involvement in the music duo PhootPrintz. He was born in Tema.

== Music career ==
In 2013, Mista Shaw, along with Flyboy Geesus, formed the duo PhootPrintz and released the track 'Jackie Appiah,' featuring Sarkodie and Bisa Kdei, which gained prominence. This debut hit, produced by Laxio Beats, marked their entry into the music scene. Another single, 'Tell Me What You Want,' featuring Flowking Stone and produced by Magnom Beats, followed later that year.

In 2016, Mista Shaw embarked on a solo career, parting ways with his musical partner. He released his debut solo single "Popular" on November 17, 2016, produced by King of Accra, which gained recognition on SoundCity TV's Top 10 Ghana music countdown.

== Nominations ==
The PhootPrintz track Tell Me What You Want was nominated in the Best Group video category of the MTN 4syteTv Music Video Awards 2016.

== Discography ==
- 2016 – "Popular" – produced by King of Accra

== Videography ==
- 2016 – "Popular" – directed by Joy Williams
