= List of African guitarists =

This is a list of influential African guitarists.

== Guitarists ==
- Ibrahim Ag Alhabib - guitarist of the band Tinariwen
- Barthelemy Attisso - lead guitarist of Orchestre Baobab, of Senegal
- Afel Bocoum - Malian guitarist, Ali Farka Touré's noted protégé
- Omara "Bombino" Moctar - internationally acclaimed Tuareg guitarist and singer-songwriter from Agadez, Niger
- Henri Bowane - figure in the development of Congo rumba, early mentor to Franco
- Oliver De Coque - Ogene Sound Super of Africa
- Victor Démé - singer and guitarist from Burkina Faso
- Fatoumata Diawara - Malian guitarist and singer
- Diblo Dibala - Congolese soukous musician, known as "Machine Gun" for his speed and skill on the guitar
- Mamadou Diop (also known as Modou Diop) - Senegalese rhythm guitarist, now based in the United States
- Sona Jobarteh - Griot kora player, singer and guitarist from Gambia
- Nico Kasanda (a.k.a. "Dr. Nico") - a pioneer of soukous music
- Omar Khorshid - Influential Egyptian pioneer guitar virtuoso who accompanied many singers, including Farid Al Atrash, Umm Kulthum, Mohamed Abdel Wahab, and Abdel Halim Hafez.
- Habib Koité - vocalist and guitarist from Mali
- Ismaël Lô - Senegalese musician and actor
- Alick Macheso - bass guitarist of his owned band Orchestra Mberikwazvo, of Zimbabwe
- François Luambo Makiadi (a.k.a. "Franco") - Congolese musician; founder of the seminal group OK Jazz
- Michelino Mavatiku Visi (a.k.a "Michelino") - Soukous recording artist, composer, guitarist and vocalist.
- Nico Mbarga - lead guitarist; composer of the hit song "Sweet Mother"
- Louis Mhlanga - Zimbabwean guitarist and producer
- Oliver Mtukudzi - guitarist from Zimbabwe; leader of the Black Spirits
- Mono Mukundu - Zimbabwean music producer, composer, and multi-instrumentalist
- Jean-Bosco Mwenda - pioneer of African fingerstyle in 1950s, Congo
- Ray Phiri - lead guitarist from Mpumalanga, South Africa; guitar sessions on Paul Simon's album Graceland
- Jonah Sithole - Zimbabwean guitarist, played with Thomas Mapfumo
- Ebo Taylor - Ghanaian Highlife and Afrobeat guitarist, friend of Fela Kuti
- Boubacar Traoré - Malian folk and blues guitarist
- Djelimady Tounkara - lead guitarist for the Super Rail Band of Bamako, Mali
- Ali Farka Touré - singer and guitarist from Malif
- Vieux Farka Touré - son of Ali Farka Touré; young rising star from Mali
- Rokia Traoré - Malian songwriter and guitarist
- Sir Victor Uwaifo - guitarist from bini/Edo speaking people, based in Benin City, Edo State, Nigeria
- Dr Sir Warrior - vocalist and guitarist of Oriental Brothers International Band
