= Idrissa Camara (dancer) =

Guinean-born dancer and choreographer

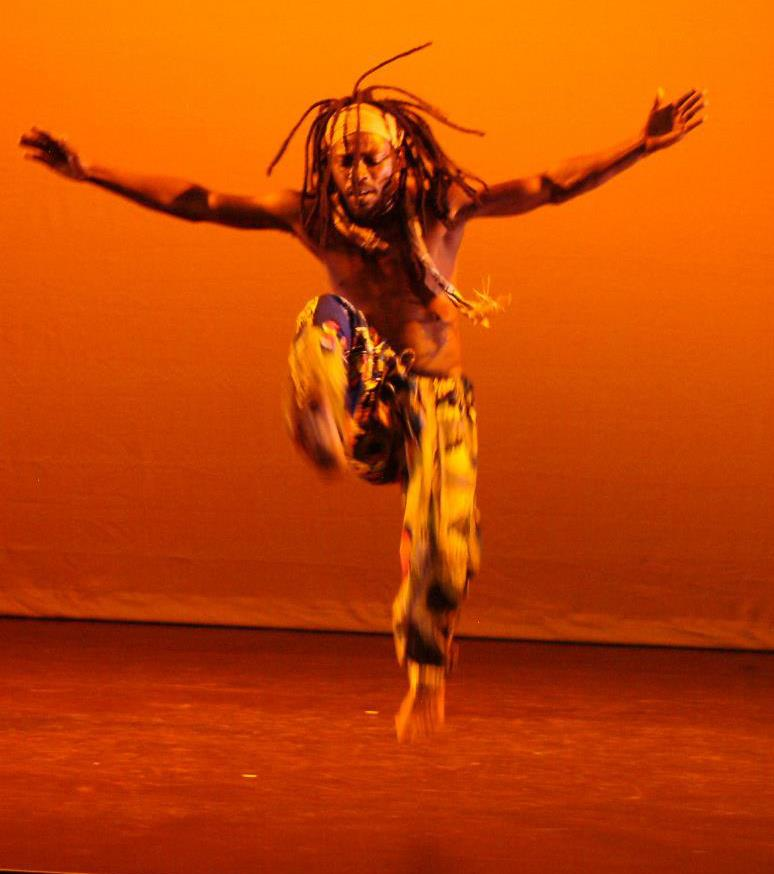
- Occupation(s): Dancer and choreographer
- Employer: Ballet Nimba
- Notable work: Sogay ("Sunrise"), 2012

Idrissa Camara is a dancer and choreographer originating from Guinea in West Africa. He has made the UK his home and is director of Ballet Nimba, an African dance theatre company that he founded in 2010. Camara is also a music recording artist, having produced an album titled Sogay with his company's musicians, and more recently he has turned his hand to filmmaking, producing the short documentary Fare Ta.

Ballet Nimba features traditional and contemporary West-African dance and music, with a strong presence in the Black Dance Sector. Camara was named as one of the top 10 people to meet at the 2010 Decibel Performing Arts Showcase, Arts Council England's biggest bi-annual event promoting diversity and equality in the Arts. In 2013, Camara was awarded a Trailblazer Fellowship from the Association of Dance of the African Diaspora. These 2013–14 trailblazer bursaries were given "in recognition of creative spark, ambition and leadership potential".

In 2012, Ballet Nimba became recording artists with their first album, Saiyama, and performed on the world stage, headlining festivals in the UK and in Europe. Their album was digitally released in 2013. They were asked to attend the Trac Cymru programme for International Development in 2013 and subsequently were successful in being picked for the WOMEX legacy tour for October 2013.

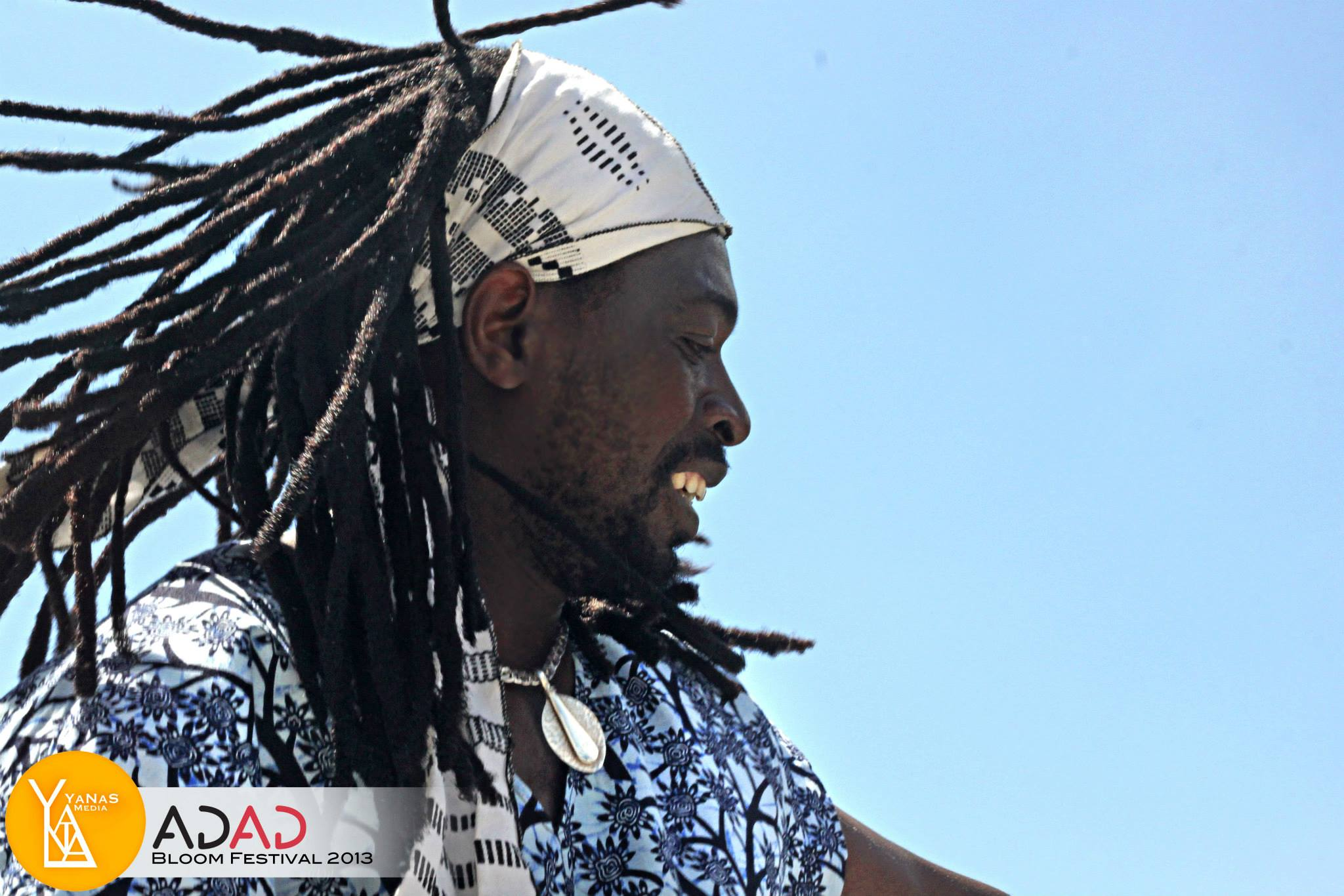
Camara performing with Ballet Nimba at the ADAD Bloom Festival 2013

In 2014, Ballet Nimba produced the company's first film, a documentary film by Camara, which was first screened at Chapter Arts Centre in Cardiff at the Wales Dance Platform Event. The film had its North American premiere at the Silicon Valley African Film Festival, where it won the award for Best Documentary Short.

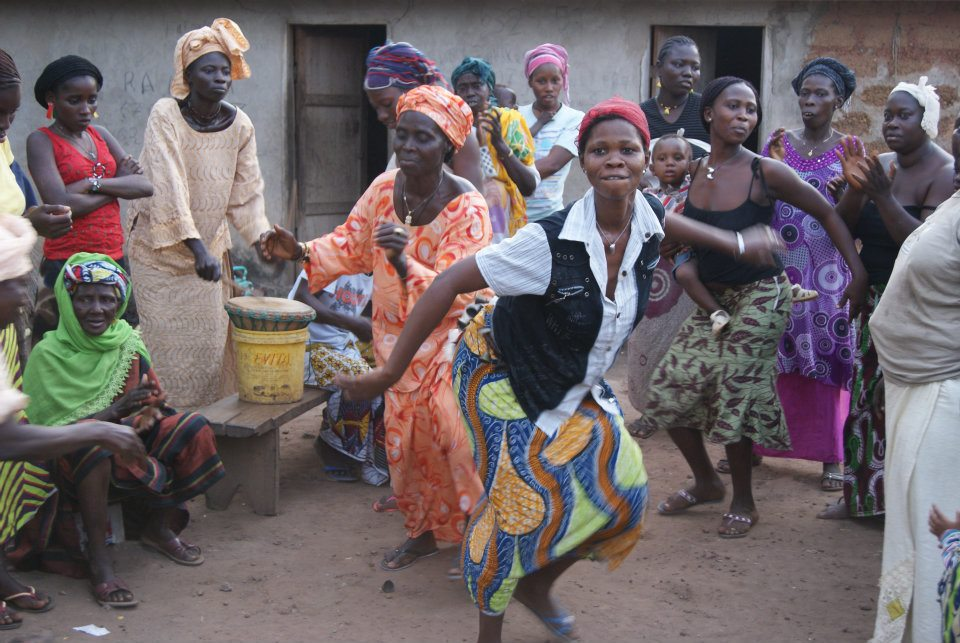
Fare-Ta, a film by Camara, wins Best Documentary Short at the Silicon Valley African Film Festival 2014

== Performances ==
Ballet Nimba are self-styled ambassadors for West African art and culture in the UK. The artists are from several West African nations and they have performed all over the UK at festivals, arts centres and rural touring venues, most significantly at London's Southbank Centre and WOMAD's UK festivals. Ballet Nimba's performances incorporate acrobatic dancing, traditional musicians and drama. Productions are based on traditional mythology but performed by young contemporary artists with an original soundtrack.

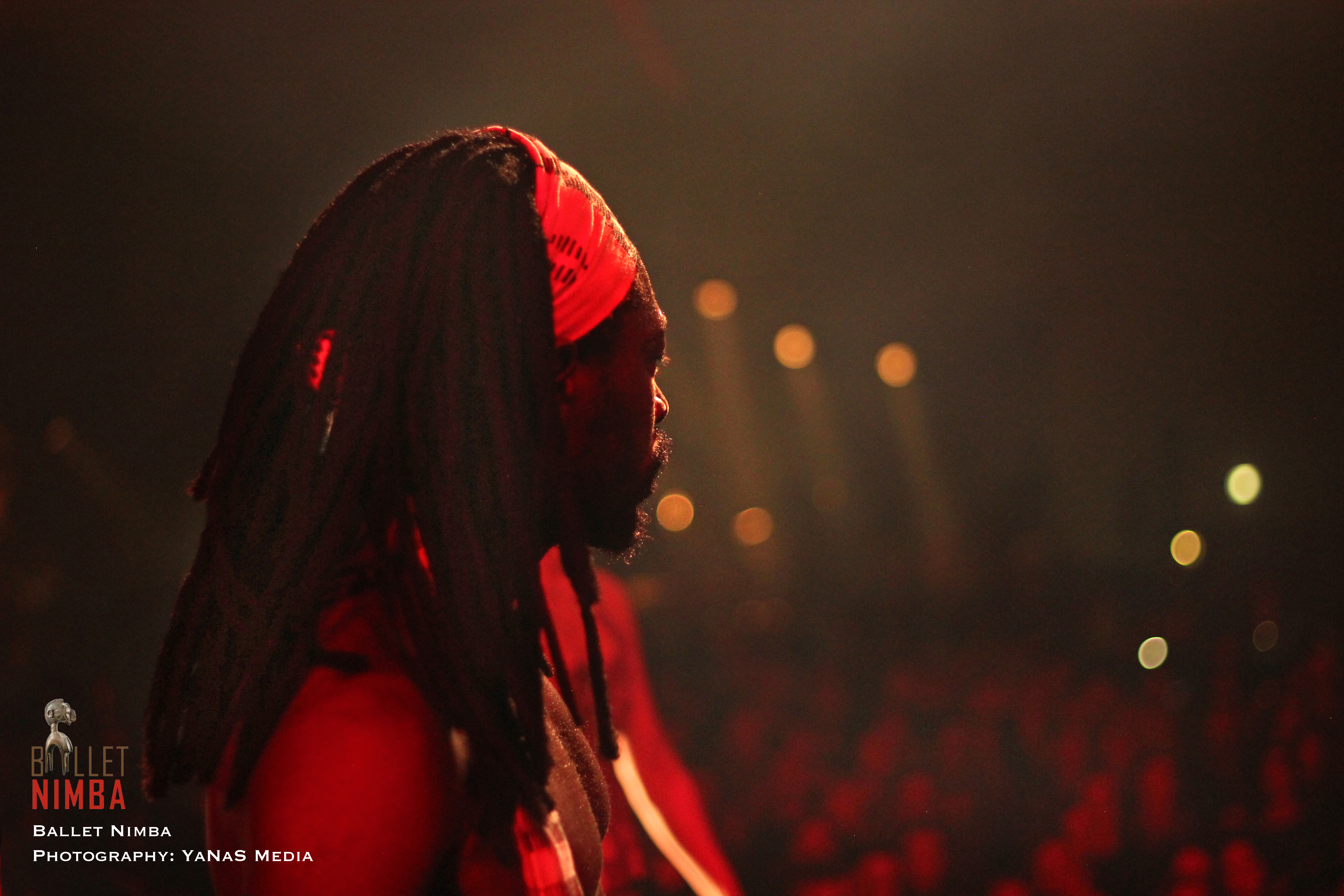
Camara at the 2013 Festival Complet Mandeng in France

== Productions ==
- Spirit Mask, 2010
- Saiyama and Payapaya, 2011
- BagaTai ("Land of the Baga"), 2012
- Kobaya, 2013 – a piece commissioned by MYDC for young people
- Sagatala ("Man"), 2014 – a look at masculinity from a Guinean perspective
- Fare-Ta ("Land of Dance") – a documentary short film by Idrissa Camara
- Ntokee ("The Way You See Me"), 2014–15

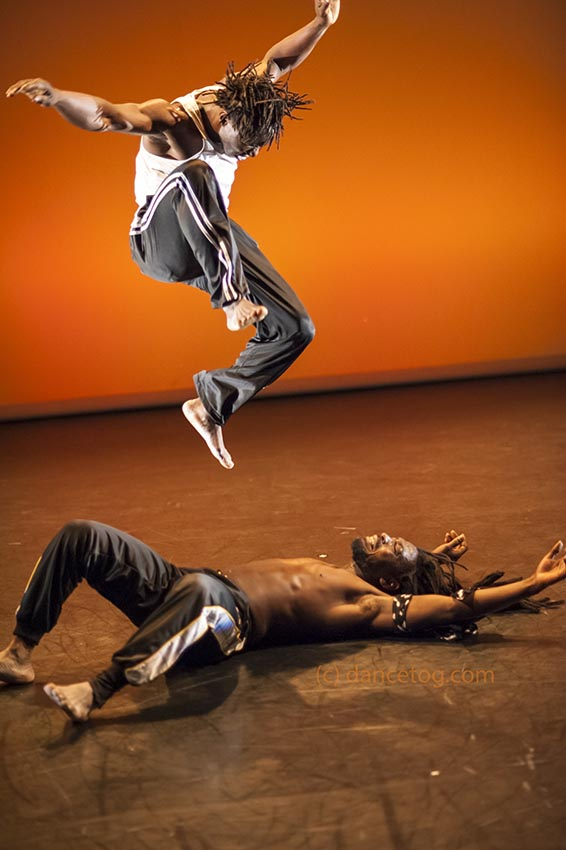
Sagatala looks at the socially constructed dominant masculine identity, juxtaposed with the individual's vulnerability. Danced and choreographed by Idrissa Camara and Oumar Almamy Camara

== Discography ==
- Sogay (Sunrise), 2012
