= Ballet Nimba =

Ballet Nimba from Guinea is an African dance theatre company and music recording artist. It is the first of its kind to be based in Wales, UK. It was founded in 2010 by Guinean choreographer Idrissa Camara with its home in Cardiff and is made up of a collective of about 15 dancers and musicians.

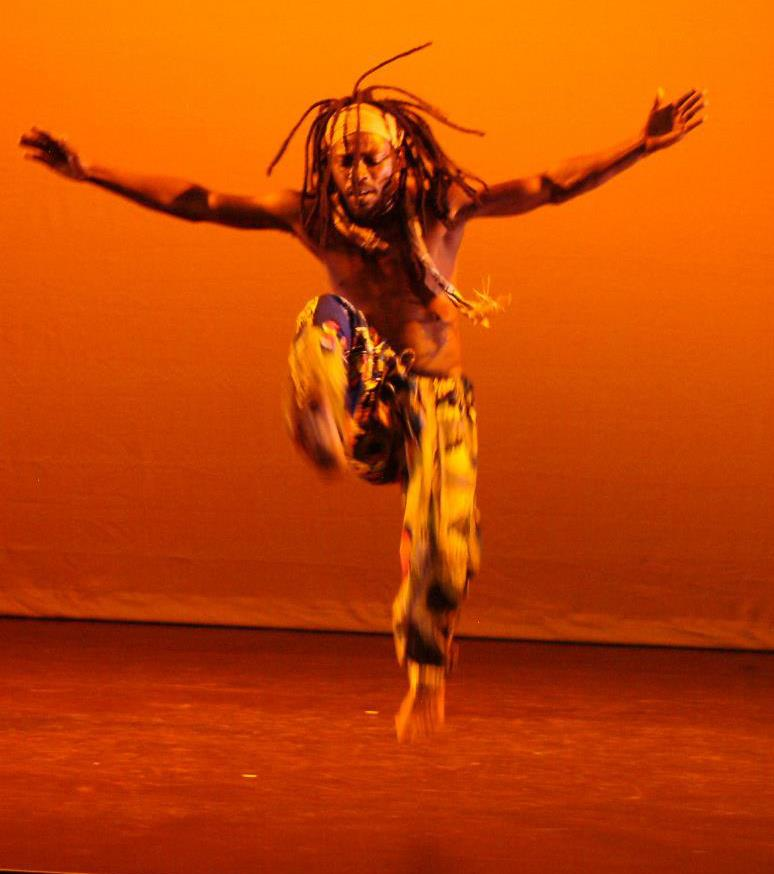
Ballet Nimba's Artistic Director performs at the Southbank Centre, London 2011

== History ==
Ballet Nimba, Wales's first and only professional Black dance company, was founded by Guinea-born choreographer Idrissa Camara in May 2010, following receipt of a grant from the Arts Council of Wales.

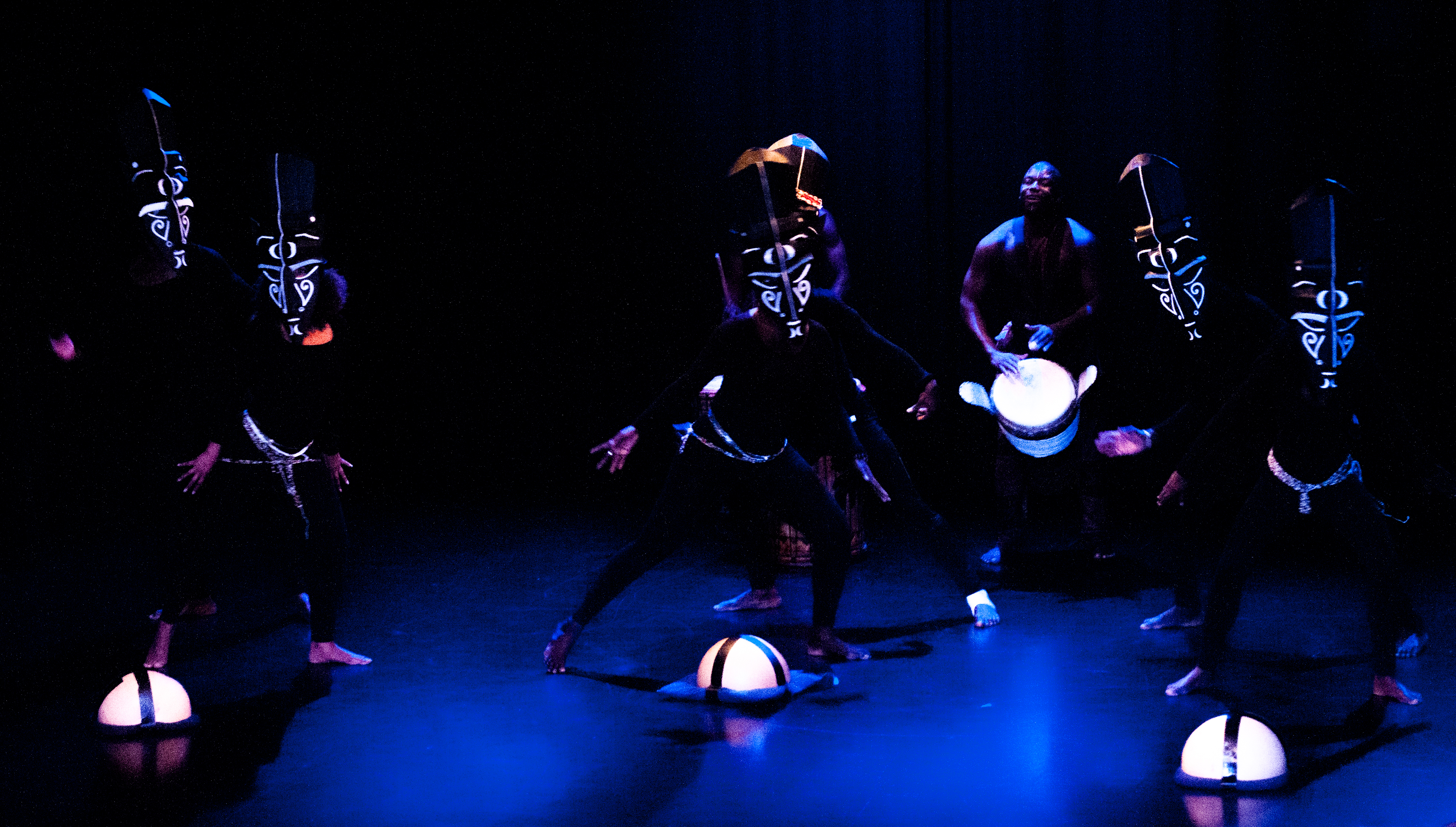
The masks in production "Bagatai" 2013

Ballet Nimba features traditional and contemporary West-African Dance and Music, with a strong presence in the Black Dance Sector. Idrissa Camara was named as one of the top 10 people to meet at the 2010 Decibel Performing Arts Showcase, Arts Council England's biggest bi-annual event promoting diversity and equality in the Arts. In 2013 Idrissa Camara was awarded a Trailblazer Fellowship from the Association of Dance of the African Diaspora. These 2013-14 trailblazer bursaries were given "in recognition of creative spark, ambition and leadership potential". Ballet Nimba is based on the "African Ballet" tradition which was born in Guinea to tell the stories of the Griots (travelling musicians and the region's oral historians) using artistic choreography and made famous by Les Ballets Africains. The name Ballet Nimba not only reflects the inspiration behind their work but is also a political statement regarding the reclamation of the term "Ballet" and challenges the perception that African dance is something from the past to be viewed with nostalgia, rather than the dynamic and exciting art form which it is.

In 2012 Ballet Nimba became recording artists with their first album Saiyama, and performed on the world stage, headlining festivals in the UK and in Europe. Their album was digitally released in 2013. They were asked to attend the Trac Cymru programme for International Development in 2013 and subsequently were successful in being picked for the WOMEX legacy tour for October 2013

In 2014 Ballet Nimba produced its first film, a Documentary Film by Idrissa Camara. It was first screened at Chapter Arts Centre in Cardiff at the Wales Dance Platform Event. It had its North American Premiere at the Silicon Valley African Film Festival where it won the award for Best Documentary Short.

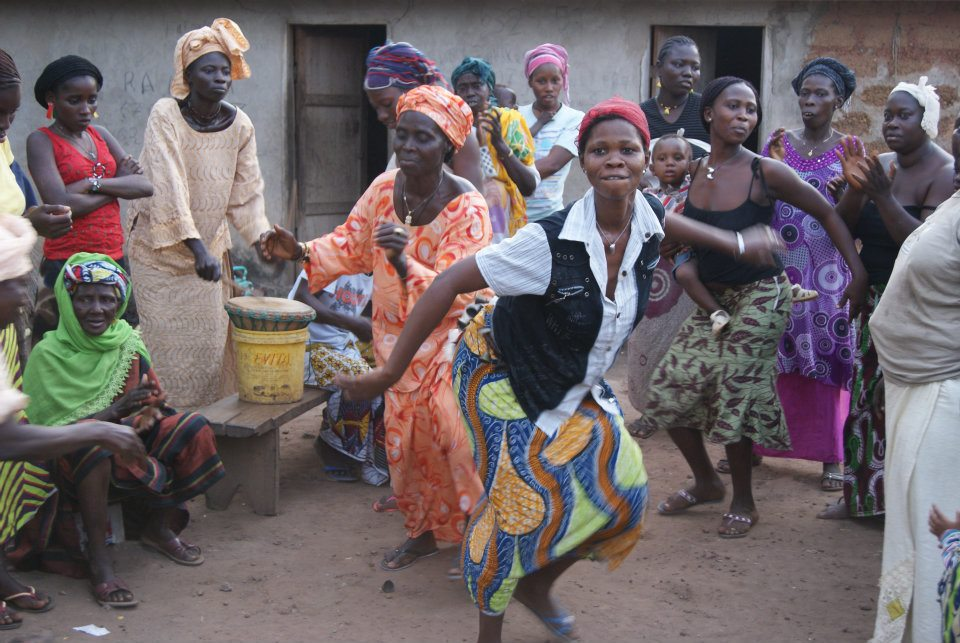
Fare-Ta, a film by Idrissa Camara wins Best Documentary Short at the Silicon Valley African Film Festival 2014

== Performances ==
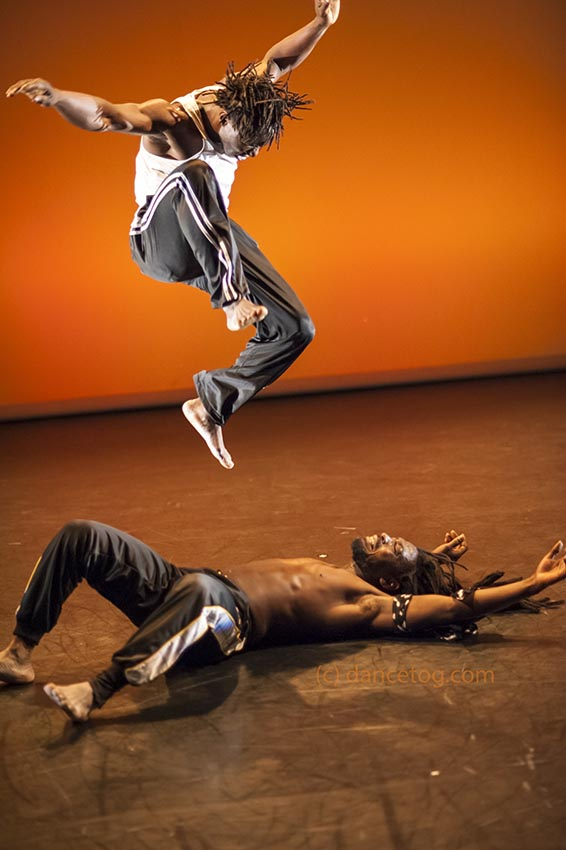
Sagatala looks at the socially constructed dominant masculine identity, juxtaposed with the individual's vulnerability.Danced and choreographed by Idrissa Camara and Oumar Almamy Camara

Ballet Nimba are self-styled ambassadors for West African Art and culture in the UK. The artists are from several West African nations and they have performed all over the UK at festivals, art centres and rural touring venues, most significantly at London's Southbank Centre and WOMAD's UK festivals. Their performances incorporate acrobatic dancing, traditional musicians and drama. Productions are based on traditional mythology but performed by young contemporary artists with an original sound track.

== Productions ==
- Spirit Mask, 2010
- Saiyama and Payapaya, 2011
- BagaTai (Land of the Baga), 2012
- Kobaya (2013), a piece commissioned by MYDC for young people
- Sagatala (Man), 2014, a look at masculinity from a Guinean perspective
- Fare- Ta (Land of Dance), a documentary short film by Idrissa Camara
- Ntokee (The Way you see me), 2014–15

== Discography ==
- Sogay (Sunrise) 2012
