= Viviana Nyachan =

South Sudanese singer

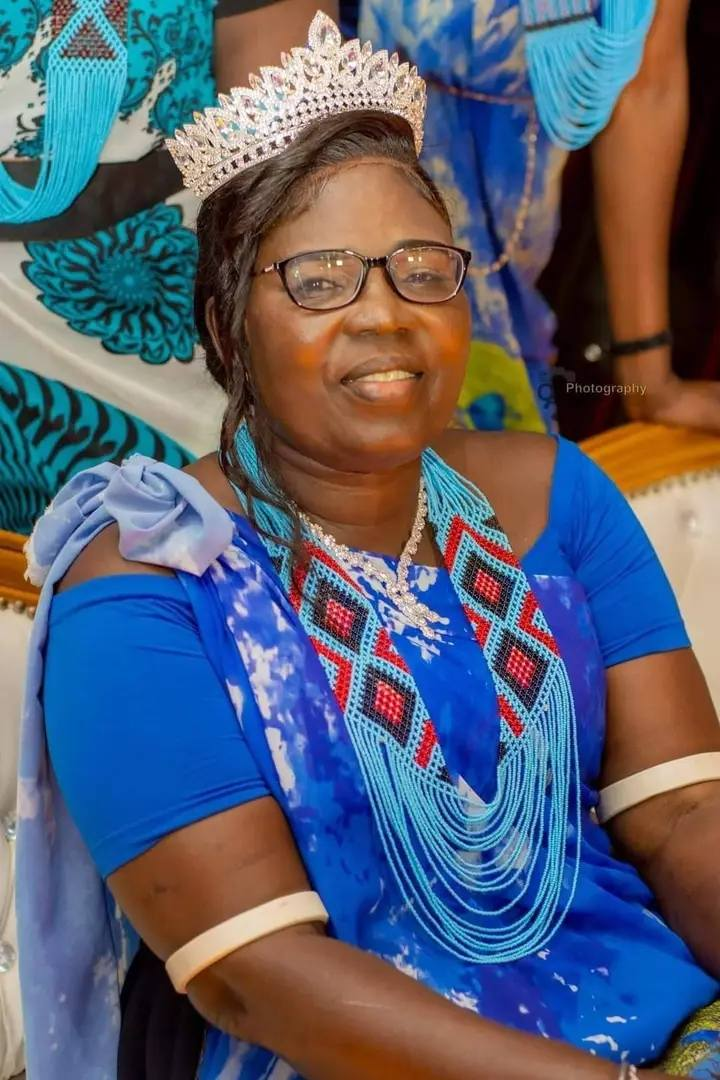

Viviana Nyachan James Chwai (1965 – 14 April 2026), popularly known as Nyachan, was a South Sudanese singer and songwriter regarded as one of the early pioneers of South Sudanese music. She performed primarily in the Shilluk language, while also singing in Arabic and English. Active from the 1980s, Nyachan became widely recognized for songs focused on peace, love, patriotism, and cultural identity. She was considered one of the most prominent female musical voices from South Sudan.

== Early life and education ==
Viviana Nyachan James Chwai was born in 1965 in Lul, Fashoda County, Upper Nile State, in present-day South Sudan. She belonged to the Shilluk community. She completed her elementary and intermediate education in Lul before attending Kodok Girls Secondary School in Fashoda County. After secondary school, she was admitted to a teacher training institute in Malakal, where she began developing her singing career.

Nyachan was fluent in Shilluk, Arabic, and English, and also had limited knowledge of Dinka and Nuer.

== Career ==
Nyachan began singing in the 1980s during a period of political instability and civil conflict affecting southern Sudan. Her music gained popularity among South Sudanese audiences for its themes of unity, resilience, peace, and cultural pride. Although many of her songs were performed in Shilluk, she developed a following that extended beyond Shilluk-speaking communities.

She became associated with the Sudanese Artists Union, where she was often selected to represent southern Sudan in performances and cultural events. During her career, she performed in several countries, including Switzerland, Kenya, Syria, and Australia, in addition to appearances across Sudan.

Nyachan's most active and commercially successful years were spent in Khartoum, where she reached a wider audience. Her musical career lasted approximately two decades.

She has been described as one of the pioneering figures of South Sudanese modern music, alongside other early artists such as Nyankol Mathiang.

== Musical style and themes ==
Nyachan's music combined traditional and folk influences with modern popular styles. Her songs addressed themes including peace and reconciliation, love and family life, patriotism, Shilluk cultural identity, social unity, and women’s empowerment.

She was especially known for songs that resonated during times of war and displacement.

== Selected songs ==
Among her best known songs were:

- Piny Dhali Tyenyo
- Lidho Yan
- Nyikang Ya Bi Lawi
- Alal Nya Bwojo
- Raj Piny
- Hakuma ta mara
- Pachoda Pa Mer

Her later recordings included the album Wadakona.

== Personal life ==
Nyachan had four children.

== Death and legacy ==
Nyachan died on 14 April 2026 at Gurei Hospital in Juba, South Sudan, after an illness. She was 61 years old. Her death was widely mourned by South Sudanese officials, musicians, and members of the public.
