= Joe Hall Morris =

American dentist, educator (1922–2003)

Joe Hall Morris (1922 – September 11, 2003) was an American oral surgeon and educator at the University of Tennessee who developed a Bi-Phase External Fixation Splint. Further key contributions to the field of modern dentistry include the Orthognathic Surgery Simulating Instrument, or OSSI. His work in the biomechanical aspects of oral and maxillofacial surgery have had an impact on the fields of maxillofacial trauma and Orthognathic surgery.

== Education ==
Morris graduated from the University of Tennessee, College of Dentistry in 1945. He trained in oral and maxillofacial surgery at the University of Tennessee. He served as an oral surgeon in the U.S. Army at Fort Benning, Georgia from 1951 to 1953.

== Career ==
Morris became the director of the Oral & Maxillofacial Surgery Program at the University of Tennessee in 1965. He was chairman of the Oral Surgery Department at the University of Tennessee from 1966-1988.
