= Chriss Eazy =

Rwandan singer

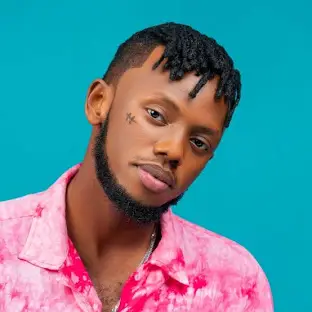

Background information
- Born: Murenzi Christian; 2002 (age 23–24); Kigali, Rwanda
- Genres: R&B, hiphop, Afro beat
- Occupations: Singer, songwriter, video director

Murenzi Christian, also known as Chriss Eazy, is a Rwandan singer. He released his debut single, Ese Urabizi, in May 2020. He followed up his debut with his sophomore single, "Tegereza". He released the singe "Bana" in October 2023. Chriss Eazy started music in hip hop but after continued in Afrobeat. He won KISS Summer Awards 2022 and other prizes. Chriss Eazy is the CEO of the fashion brand Ewuana.
