= Silver X =

silver x
- Also known as: Uztas Ta Dunia (which means "Teacher of the World")
- Born: Okuta Ceaser Malish Jeremiah; December 2, 1988 (age 37); Torit, South Sudan
- Genres: R&B; hip-hop; pop
- Occupation: Singer
- Instruments: Piano
- Years active: 2008–present
- Labels: International Records; South Sound Production; Granpa Records; Washington
- Website: silver-x.net

Okuta Ceaser Malish Jeremiah (born December 2, 1988) in Torit, South Sudan, known by his stage name Silver X, is a South Sudanese singer. Silver X has won many East African awards in Nairobi, Kenya as well as South Sudanese awards in Juba.

== Musical career ==
Before finding residence in Juba in 2007, he released his first album named Binia Lotuko before he founded a music group named New Sudan Superstars in 2008. Since the inception of Silver his living in Juba he has released his second album titled Wasaaka Bataal, which is translated, "rubbish is bad". The album was sponsored by NGO to run the campaign for awareness of hygiene and sanitation in Eastern Equatoria state in 2008. The same year he released his third studio album under the name "Sudan Belade Saeem", likewise the album was sponsored by the ministry of health of Eastern Equatoria state. In 2009 his fame went throughout southern Sudan (now South Sudan), Gulu in northern Uganda, and the Sudanese capital Khartoum. In 2010 he launched his fourth debut studio album titled "Fattisu Shockoal", which is translated, "searching for a job". The album is the most played song by Silver X because the song is concerned with the youths who are searching for jobs, yet no one is willing to employ them though they are qualified and graduated. The song was voted by many radio stations as a song of the year. The same year he unveiled his fifth studio album Wele which was voted as Voice of the People (VP) song of the year, and it was also voted as a song of the year by SSOSA music awards. In the year of 2012 he launched Masura, 2013 he launched Carolina, in 2014 he launched Ana Bi Wori, and in 2015 he launched Dunia Karabu. Silver X launched a video in Nairobi on 29 April 2016, the song titled East African Lover, it is Silver X's first collaboration with Kenyan female singer Rennee. The U.S. magazine Foreign Policy included Silver X as one of its 100 "top global thinkers" in 2014. In 2021 south Sudanese female musician attacks Silver X and calls him a musician feeding off sugar mummy properties.

== Personal life ==
Silver X the founder and CEO of Holyland music married Susan Diiku in Kampala.

== Awards ==
- 2014 - Best Male Artist, Eye Radio Music Awards
- 2018 - Best Male Artist of the year
- 2019 - Eye Radio Awards
- 2022 - Male Artist of the year SSMA awards
