= Dusty & Stones =

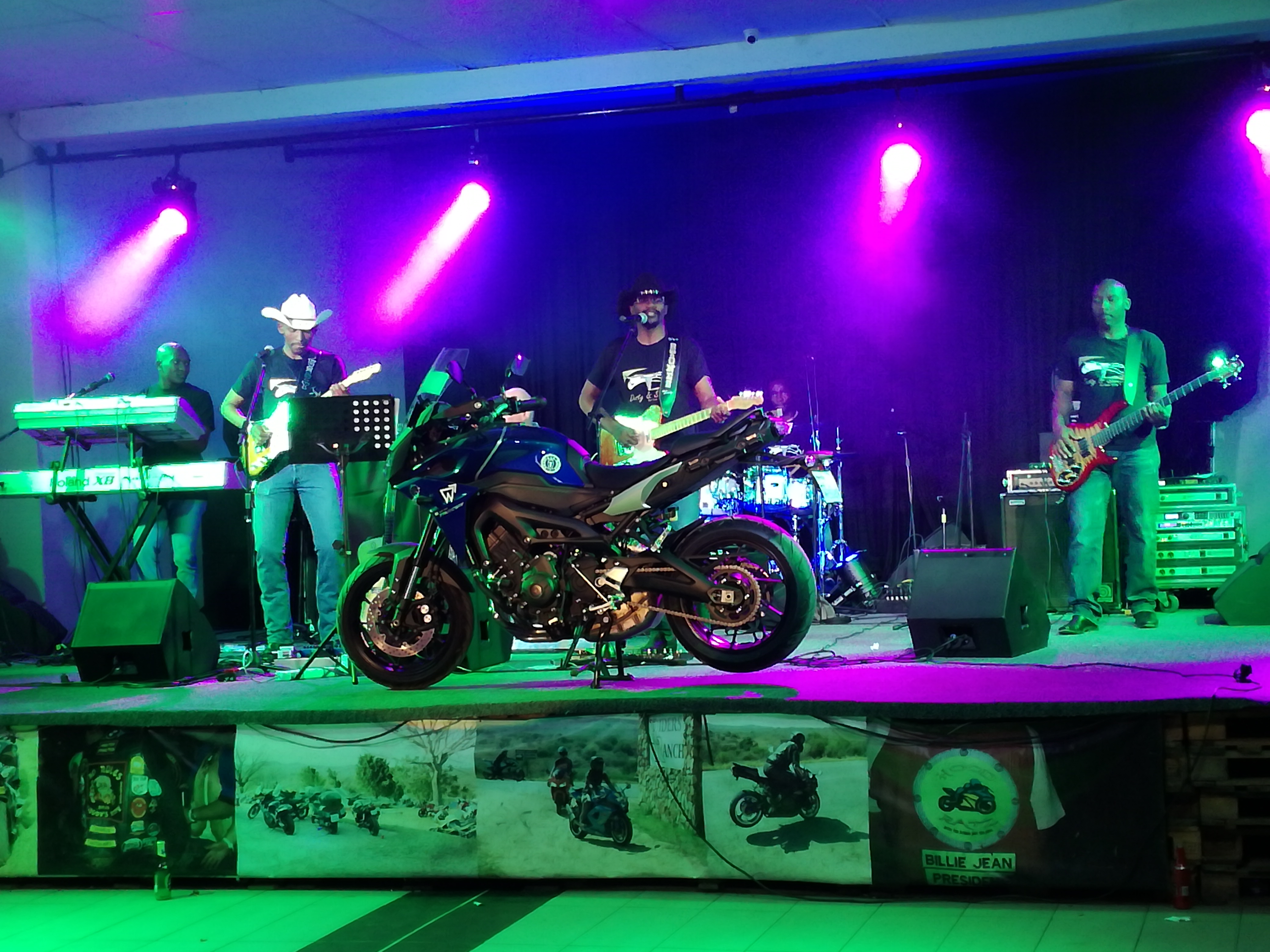
- Dusty & Stones and their Buck Horns Band performing at the Swazi Rally on 26 August 2017.

Background information
- Origin: Manzini, Eswatini
- Genres: Country
- Years active: 2005–present
- Members: Gazi Simelane "Dusty"; Lindokuhle Msibi "Stones"

Dusty & Stones is a country music duo from Eswatini, Africa, consisting of cousins Gazi "Dusty" Simelane (born 22 March 1982) and Linda "Stones" Msibi (born 23 December 1983), both vocalists, guitarists and songwriters. The duo was founded in 2005.

Dusty is mostly on lead vocals while Stones is mostly on harmony vocals. The duo released their first and only studio album, Mooihoek Country Fever, in 2009, which won the Best Country Music Artists/Group award in their home country for three consecutive years (2010, 2011 and 2013).

Two Irish radio DJs discovered their music in 2015. Their songs "Ride with me" and "Mkhulu welfu" became moderately popular in Ireland as a result.

Dusty and Stones share guitar solo parts during their performances.

They made their Grand Ole Opry debut performance on September 30, 2023.

Dusty & Stones has a feature film which was filmed from 2017 to 2020. This film chronicles the duo's musical journey. The film has featured in numerous film festivals, making its premiere at DOCNYC in November 2023. It also featured at the Treefort Film Festival in which the duo made its USA debut performance. The film also featured at the Nashville Film Festival 2023 in Nashville Tennessee.

== Early childhood and education ==
Dusty and Stone grew up together as cousins and spent time on their grandfather's farm together. They were drawn to country music as it reflected their experiences of a small town life on a farm. Their grandfather was a pastor and played harmonica, he was influential in their upbringing and taught them the value of patience and hard work which later affected their music. Dusty's brother Sicelo also fostered their love for music and had a collection of country music records he would share with them. Dusty went to Velebantfu High School for his high school education, while Stone moved around a bit more. He went to Ngwane Practising School for his early education, Franson Christian High for his secondary (middle school) education, and Ngwane Central High for high school. They both then received a college/university education as well with Dusty going to University of Eswatini and becoming a teacher and Stones going to Eswatini College of Technology and later Institute of Commercial Management, becoming qualified as a project manager.
