= Abitor Makafui =

Togolese female pastor and singer

- Citizenship: Togo
- Occupations: Singer; Pastor

Abitor Makafui is a physically disabled Togolese female pastor, activist and gospel music singer. In 2009, she was awarded the "Woman Leader" prize for her work in the Makafui foundation, a charitable non-governmental organization helping underprivileged children in Togo.
