= Neyma =

Mozambican singer (born 1979)

- Born: 6 May 1979 (age 47); Maputo, Mozambique
- Genres: Marrabenta; Kizomba; Afro-Zouk
- Occupation: Singer
- Years active: 1999–present
- Label: Vidisco (Marrabenta Productions)

Neyma Julio Alfredo (born 6 May 1979) is a Mozambican singer. She is known for producing songs of the Mozambican genre, such as Marrabenta and Kizomba.

== Biography ==
Neyma began her interest in music at a young age, singing at various events in and around Maputo. She was an ambassador for the United Nations Children's Fund (UNICEF) in Mozambique until the end of 2019.

== Career ==
Neyma began her music career appearing on the televised singing competition Fantasia where she took second place. Her breakthrough followed in 1999 upon her first commercial album, Brigas which features the popular singles "Brigas", "Mae virtude mais bela" and the well-received single, "Praia feliz". The success of the album Brigas led her to release Baila in 2000 and Renascer in 2001. Arromba, released in 2005, solidified Neyma as an acclaimed singer from Mozambique and the Lusophone world. In early 2010, she released her sixth album, entitled Neyma 10 Anos in reference to her 10 years in the Mozambican music industry.

== Arromba ==
In the summer of 2005, Neyma released Arromba, her most popular album to date which sold more than 40,000 copies in Mozambique. The album was well-received in Angola, Cape Verde, and Portugal. The album features the self-titled single, Arromba which is kizomba genre. Another single off the album which was well received was Lirrandzo, which turned out to be the most popular song of the year, and "Arromba" turned out to be the summer anthem of 2005.

== Neyma 10 Anos ==
Her sixth album entitled Neyma 10 Anos memorialized her 10 years in the Mozambican music industry. "Ilusão" is her single hit which is a balled duet with a popular international artist Grace Evora and it was awarded by Mozambique Music Awards alongside the award of Best Female Artist in 2010. "A Hi Dzimeni" is a traditional Marrabenta-style song that became the anthem for women's emancipation and the agricultural movement in the country. 10 Anos was awarded 'Best Selling Album' at 2011 MMA's.

== Idiomas ==
In early 2006, Neyma returned to the studio and recorded a new album. In late 2006, she released Idiomas and released Mbilo Yanga as the first single off the album. With this album, Neyma mixed Marrabenta, Coupé-Décalé, Kizomba and traditional Mozambican rhythms to create a unique sound. Mbilo Yanga, a Kizomba genre of music, put her again on the international scene where she received numerous nominations for the song. Other acknowledged singles off the album include Nunawanga Yuwi, Xilhamaliso, Marrido do Dono and Te Amo, a Kizomba-Balade style.

== Discography ==
=== Albums ===
- Brigas (1999)
- Baila (2000)
- Renascer (2001)
- Arromba (2005)
- Idiomas (2006)
- Neyma 10 Anos (2010)
- Neyma Greatest Hits (2014)
- Parabéns (2015)
