= Joe Morris (drummer) =

American musician

- Birth name: Joe Morris
- Also known as: "One Take Joe"
- Born: March 7, 1960 (age 65); Wilkes-Barre, Pennsylvania, US
- Genres: Jazz, Rock, Funk, Fusion, Pop
- Occupation: Musician
- Instrument(s): drums, percussion
- Years active: 1978 – Present
- Website: Official website

Joe Morris (born March 7, 1960) is an American drummer based in Phoenix.

He has released 5 solo CD's. One of which, Joe Morris and Friends, was released in GTS 5.1 Surround Sound, thereby making Joe the first drummer to put out a solo CD in this format. Additionally, this CD was used by Genelec for demo purposes at trade shows all over the United States and Europe.

Morris is a member of the Esteban Band. Joe has recorded over 17 Esteban CD's and produced the Esteban Live CD that went number 2 on Billboard. Additionally, he is on the Intimate Evening with Esteban video, The Esteban Live at Red Rocks DVD and the Esteban and Friends DVD which hit number 1 on the Billboard charts.

Joe is also a clinician for major drum manufacturers, and the music director at the Conservatory of Recording Arts and Sciences. He has performed in clinics all over the world. Joe Morris was chosen by The Fender Music Corporation to be the drummer on the Fender Stage at the 2002 Namm Show. Joe played with tons of different artists including: Greg Koch, Ray Riendeau, Gary Hoey, Kim Stone and Reggie Hamilton. He was also included in the Fender Clinic Tour featuring guitarist Greg Koch and bassist Ray Riendeau. When the clinic tour ended the band was invited to Steve Vai's Studio to record a CD. "Radio Free Gristle" is out on Favored Nations Records which is Steve Vai's label. Joe was featured on a track on the "Lords of the Bass" CD along with Dave Weckl and had the pleasure of playing Bass Day in New York with Ray Riendeau, Victor Wooten, Christian McBride, Matthew Garrison and T.M. Stevens.

Joe's touring and recording work includes movies, shows and artists like Jay Davidson, Whitney Houston, Rascal Flats, Steve Vai, Reggie Hamilton, Chuck Rainey, Bobby Vega, Robert Scovill, Donny Osmond, Greg Koch, Jesse McGuire, Kim Stone, Gary Hoey, Paul Cotton, Rusty Young, Poco, Esteban, Ramsey Lewis, Barely Legal, Lewis Story, The X-Files, Chill Factor, A Thousand Acres, Touched by an Angel, Chicago Hope, Millennium, Dallas, General Hospital, Another World, John Grisham's The Client, Fame L.A. and many more.
