= Miss Erica =

Burundian singer-songwriter (born 1993)

- Birth name: Irakoze Erica
- Born: 3 December 1993 (age 31); Bujumbura, Burundi
- Genres: Afro pop, hiplife, R&B, dancehall
- Occupation: Singer
- Years active: 2011–2023

Irakoze Erica, known professionally as Miss Erica, is a Burundian singer-songwriter.

== Early life ==
From Burundian and Rwandan parents, Miss Erica grew up in Kigali. She embarked on a musical career after high school.

== Career ==
She made her musical debut in 2011 as a member of the Kora Entertainment label in collaboration with Best Life Music. In 2016, Miss Erica formed a duo with Lacia and collaborated on a song, with Burundian artist Sat-B titled Joto.

Many of her earlier songs were in the dancehall genre but she released a highlife song Angalia in July 2017, featuring Kiwundo artists Vampino, Rabadaba, Diplomate and Milly. Her other singles include Buziraherezo, Give me love and Mon Amour.

== Discography ==
=== Singles ===
- "Nkundira" rmx ft Gaga Blue and Frank Duniano
- "Ndatashe" Iwacu ft Sat-B
- "Tell me"
- "Give me love"
- "Joto" ft Lacia x Sat-B
- "Buziraherezo"
- "Angalia" – all Stars Kiwundo
- "Impanvu" ft Sumi Crazy
- "Mon Amour"
- Sinovako
- In My Heart ft Sat-B
- My Hero

== Awards and nominations ==
=== Buja Music Awards ===
Year	Nominee / work	Award	Result
2019	Mon Amour	Song Of The Year	Nominated
2019	Mon Amour	Best R&B/Afro Song	Nominated
2019	Miss Erica	Best Female Artist	Won
2019	Mon Amour	Video Of The Year	Nominated

=== Afrimusic Song Contest ===
Year	Nominee / work	Award	Result
2020	Miss Erica / In My Heart	Afrimusic Song Contest 2020 winner	Nominated
2020	Miss Erica / In My Heart	Eurovision Coverage Facebook Buzz Award	Won
2020	Miss Erica / In My Heart	Best French Lyric	Won
