= Elikeh =

- Origin: Washington, D.C., United States
- Genres: Afrofunk, Afropop, World
- Years active: 2006–present
- Website: www.elikeh.com

Elikeh is an Afropop band based in Washington DC, founded by the Togolese, Serge Massama Dogo. Elikeh uses elements of Togolese rhythms as a foundation for exploration into American-influenced blues, funk and rock to produce captivating Afro-pop tunes that are as listenable as they are danceable. Although based in indigenous traditions, Elikeh's music has no borders, exploring global themes and personal odysseys. The sound is very close to Osibisa and Fela Kuti.

Massama Dogo was born in Togo and developed his singing and songwriting ability performing with several local bands. He also acted as musical director of the University Orchestra in Togo.

In August 2012, Elikeh released a new album, Between 2 Worlds, featuring the Malian guitarist Vieux Farka Touré and John Kadlecik, lead guitarist of Furthur and Dark Star Orchestra. Elikeh has performed with The Wailers, Sierra Leone's Refugee All Stars and Bombino. In 2013, Elikeh won the Wammie (Washington Area Music Award) for Best World Music Album. The band was also nominated for 6 other Wammies, including Album Of The Year, Artist Of The Year and Musician Of The Year for Massama Dogo.

== Discography ==
- Nyade (2006)
- Adje! Adje! (2010)
- Between 2 Worlds (2012)
