= Bai Kamara =

Sierra Leonean musician and activist

Morlai Bai Kamara Jr. (born December 2, 1966) is a Sierra Leonean singer-songwriter, record producer, performer and activist based in Brussels, Belgium. Bai was born in Bo Town, Sierra Leone, and spent his childhood years there. His father was a politician and his mother was one of Sierra Leone's longest serving ambassadors. His exposure to the harsh realities of African politics at a young age has led to the themes of corruption, abuse of power, and social justice being prevalent in much of his music today.

At the age of 15, Bai moved to England to continue his schooling, living in Bath and Manchester, where he started to write his first songs. In 1990 he moved to Brussels and decided to pursue a career in music rather than continue with his business studies.

Bai's first band in Brussels, Odex Protocol, was a multi-national band with members from Africa, Belgium, Albania, England and America. Odex fused soul, jazz, rock & afro, and released one EP Lay Your Body Down in 1994, and an album, Delivery Day (1996).

== Solo career ==
Bai released his first solo album, Living Room/Intrinsic Equilibrium, in 2001. The album was recorded over several weeks living in a friend's house and recording in the living room. Songs such as "Go on Press" and "The Powers That Govern Us" showed a cutting social awareness, while the anthemic "Downtown St. Josse" (penned about the neighbourhood of Brussels Bai was living in) brought widespread media exposure in Belgium, and remains a favourite of fans today.

In 2005, Bai released Urban Gypsy, an album that added a more rounded soul and funk side in comparison with the stripped acoustic feel of Living Room. Leading off with "Substitute" and "Urban Gypsy", perhaps Bai's most famous songs, the album also brought together the musicians that would form the core of his band for the next decade. Guitarist Eric Moens, who had worked with Bai since the days of Odex Protocol, was joined by Thierry Rombaux on bass.

In 2010, having taken some time out of solo recording to work with the bands 15:15 and Via Con Dios (see below), Bai released Disposable Society. His most political work yet, the Latin-tinged album directly addressed the plight of the poor of the world, and the rest of the world's unwillingness to do much other than acquire possessions. "Refugee", the lead single, attempts to give personhood to the asylum seeker who is rendered faceless by politics and the media, while "Making Beggars into Thieves" and attacks those who criminalise poverty. "Your Pressure", which takes aim at the hypocrisy of the west making aid conditional while exploiting the resources and people of developing countries. The album closes with some optimism with "Better Days to Come" and "Rise", homages to Bai's native Africa's ability to revive itself.

Having toured extensively for Disposable Society, 2012's This is Home was a return to the more sensitive acoustic Bai that many fans hold great affection for. The album puts songwriting front and centre, with bare acoustic arrangements, many recorded in one or two takes. The album also showed Bai exploring his unusual guitar technique, which combines plectrum-less strumming and picking, and moving baselines with unusual chord constructions such as diminished and major seventh chords that are rarely seen in rock and folk settings. The songs "For the Promise of Gold", "My Love is Here" and "Your Love Means the World to Me" have become firm live favourites both solo and with Bai's band.

Bai's fifth solo album is currently awaiting release, but on it he has once again expanded his recorded sound by utilising his 11-touring band, loosely dubbed as The Rare Earthlings and the Mystical Survivors. The band incorporates a horn section, percussion and backing vocals to give a blend of classic and modern funk and Rhythm and Blues. He is also rumoured to be working on an album of African Blues.

== Other projects and collaborations ==
In the late 1990s, Bai worked with Youssou N'Dour and the Refugee Voices, for a UNHCR (UN Refugee Agency) project entitled Building Bridges, and released in 1998.

In 2006, Bai formed the group 15:15 with Nader Hamid, an electric guitar player and singer-songwriter originally from Iraq. 15:15 took Bai in a more rock-orientated direction, with Hamid's explosive guitar playing bringing a tougher edge to the sound. 15:15 released the album, Stoned Love (2007). Bai and Nader remain close friends, and have plans to collaborate again in the future.

In 2007, Bai worked and toured with Vaya Con Dios, who covered one of his most well-known songs, "Substitute".

It 2013, Aramak Iab, the band Bai formed with guitarist Manu Ribot, bassist Thierry Rombaux, and drummer Didier Fontaine released their debut album, Something Strong For The Road (live album). The album captured the rock/blues outfit and shows a more classic rock side of Bai's composition and performance, enhanced by the atmospheric and sometimes fiery playing of Ribot.

Bai is also a member Valve, an acoustic band that comes together for occasional gigs, particularly at the legendary Archiduc cafe in Brussels. It is built around the musicians; Joe Higham (saxes), Thierry Rombaux (bass), Eric Moens (gtrs), and Joachim Saerens (keyboards). Joe Higham and Eric Moens are two of Bai's longest-serving collaborators, having worked with him since the days of Odex Protocol (see above).

== Live ==
In addition to playing hundreds of solo concerts, Bai has also played many festivals with his band. These include Couleur Cafe, Francofolies, and Esperanzah.

In 2007, Bai toured with Vaya Con Dios, often dueting with singer Dani Klien on Bai's compositions.

In 2008, Bai contributed two songs to the soundtrack of Spanish film director Paco Torres's Magic of Hope, in which he also made a cameo appearance.

In 2013 and 2014, Bai supported Vanessa Paradis on her European and French Love album tour.

In 2015, Bai put together an 11-piece soul band to record with, and they have also played concerts across Northern Europe.

== Advocacy work ==
Bai has had a close relationship with UNHCR, working on their Building Bridges project that was released in 1998. In December 2007 he returned to Sierra Leone with a UN film crew for their documentary on Sierra Leone 10 years after the war.

Bai is an active member of Amnesty International, and regularly performs for charity events organized by them and other aid organizations.

During the ebola crisis in Sierra Leone in 2014, he did several benefit concerts in Brussels in collaboration with Médecins Sans Frontières (MSF) and EMERGENCY.

In late 2015, After seeing the images of refugees and their families drowning on the beaches of Turkey and on the Mediterranean coast Bai assembled a team of top Belgian artists to record his song "If I could Walk On Water", to raise funds for MSF Belgium's Refugee support work. They included vocalists Daan, Guy Swinnen (The Scabs) Marie Daulne (Zap Mama), Stéphanie Blanchoud and Beverly Jo Scott. Manou Gallo played bass on the track, and it also included Nina Babet, Kiù Jérôme, Daddy Waku and Marie-Ange Tchaï Teuwen (all backing vocals), Jon Bradshaw (The Benzine Project) on percussion, and Eric Moens (guitars).

== Discography ==
- 1996 Lay Your Body EP (Odex Protocol)
- 1998 Delivery Day (Odex Protocol)
- 2001 Living Room/Intrinsic Equilibrium (Bai Kamara Jr.)
- 2005 Urban Gipsy (Bai Kamara Jr.)
- 2007 Stoned Love Vol. 1 (15:15)
- 2010 Disposable Society
- 2012 This Is Home
- 2017 Bai kamara Jr Presents The Mystical Survivors and Some Rare Earthlings Vol 1
- 2020 Salone (Bai Kamara Jr)
- 2023 Traveling Medicine Man
