= Simeon Beard =

American minister, teacher and politician

Simeon W. Beard was an American minister, teacher, and politician who worked in Charleston, South Carolina and then in Augusta, Georgia. He served in the Union Army. He was a delegate to Georgia's constitutional convention in 1867 and 1868. African American legislators were expelled from office in Georgia.

Beard was a member of the Union Waiter's Society. He taught in Charleston, South Carolina before returning to Augusta. His school in Charleston was established in the antebellum period. Beard's classes were relatively expensive and well supplied.

He was part of the Georgia delegation, along with Georgia Governor Rufus Bullock who met with the U.S. president.

He read the Declaration of Independence and Emancipation Proclamation at a Freedmen's Celebration. He addressed an 1870 meeting of Republicans.

The Sweetwater Enterprise described him as a bright mulatto and a fanatic. It noted his calls to arm Black militias to protect African Americans.

In 1867 he compared the American Civil War to the Biblical account of the parting of the Red Sea in Egypt to make way for freedom for the Jews.

He partnered with white Freedmen's Bureau agent John Bryant to establish the Loyal Georgian newspaper.

He was literate. Emily Edson Briggs described his appearance and wrote that "his words burn as if they had been forged in a redhot furnace."

== See also ==
- Georgia Constitutional Convention of 1867–1868
- African American officeholders from the end of the Civil War until before 1900
