= Marrabenta =

Musical genre

- Stylistic origins: Mozambique and Portuguese folk music
- Cultural origins: 1930s-1940s, Mozambique

Regional scenes
- Maputo

Marrabenta is a popular style of Mozambican dance music combining traditional Mozambican dance rhythms with Portuguese folk music. It was developed in Maputo, the capital city of Mozambique, during the 1930s and 1940s.

== Etymology ==
The name may be derived from the Portuguese word rebentar (arrabentar in the local vernacular), which means "to break". This may refer to the cheap musical instruments used in this music, which are often played energetically until they fall apart. Vocalist Dilon Djindji claims this refers to the energetic performances he delivered while on tour across Mozambique, as the intensity and vitality of his shows led audiences to believe that he was 'breaking' the emotional limits of those in attendance. The musicians who played Marrabenta came to be called arrabenta. Over time, the name Marrabenta has grown in popularity and continues to be used today.

== History ==
Marrabenta gained national popularity in Mozambique during the 1930s and 1940s while the nation was still under Portuguese colonial rule. Before the popularity of Marrabenta, Portuguese musicians in Mozambique played fado, a type of traditional Portuguese folk music. These musicians introduced the traditional orchestration and other influences of fado, such as the use of guitars, mandolins, drum sets, and other conventional Western instruments, to Mozambique. The Catholic Church, as a site for cultural interaction, also played a role in the development of the new genre, contributing influences of tonal harmony and the basic use of progressions like I-IV-V. Mozambican musicians combined the influences of church music, secular Western music, and African rhythms to create an entirely new genre.

Dance rhythms are a primary feature of traditional African music. In trying to duplicate these traditional sounds on new western instruments, Mozambican musicians created a new style of dance music, which quickly gained popularity among the youth in the 1940s. In 1977, Mozambique experienced a civil war. The government, viewing marrabenta as a way for people to express their dissent, shut down many music venues at the time. While Marrabenta's popularity began to decline during the Mozambican Civil War, it never disappeared. Fleeing the war to seek a better life and economic opportunities, many Mozambicans, including several Marrabenta musicians, migrated to South Africa. This introduced South African musical styles such as Kwela and Xangana to the Marrabenta style, adding rhythmic variety to the genre.

Upon gaining independence from Portuguese colonial rule, Mozambique came under the control of a socialist regime, resulting in new musical influences from communist Cuba. When Mozambique ceased to be a socialist country in the 1980s, Western musical influences flooded the country. These included rock and pop mainly from the United States. During this time, Marrabenta underwent significant transformation as musicians started using distortion and electronic instruments, while retaining the fundamental character of the music.

== Style ==
The Marrabenta style is a blend of traditional Mozambican rhythms and Portuguese folk music with influences from Western popular music that were brought over by radio. Early Marrabenta artists, such as Fany Pfumo, Dilon Djindji, and Wazimbo, were crucial in establishing the genre, which has evolved over time into its modern form. This evolution can be seen in Marrabenta bands such as Eyuphuro and Orchestra Marrabenta Star de Moçambique. In its contemporary form, it has combined with other pop genres. The Mozambican band Mabulu mixes marrabenta and hip hop music. The genre is celebrated annually in the Marrabenta Festival in Maputo.

== Contemporary form ==
Today, Marrabenta reflects global influences, including rhythm & blues, reggae, and blues. This has led to the emergence of a number of subgenres within Marrabenta, including pandza, which is a mix of reggae and Marrabenta and is currently very popular among the Mozambican youth. Marrabenta has also spread to other parts of Africa and the world.
