= Wazimbo =

Humberto Carlos Benfica, known as Wazimbo (born November 11, 1948), is a Mozambican vocalist considered one of the greatest voices of Mozambique and one of the most famous marrabenta singers. Born in Chibuto, in Gaza Province, Mozambique he moved to the capital — Lourenço Marques (present-day Maputo) — where he grew up in the popular neighborhood Mafalala. There he started as a vocal member for the local group "Silverstars" and then "Geiziers". Later, he joined Orchestra Marrabenta Star de Moçambique.

== Career beginnings ==
Wazimbo started to sing in 1964 with the Mozambican group Silverstars and continued as a singer with the Geiziers, performing a colonial mix of international pop music with a Brazilian tinge in Mocambique's capital, Maputo.

In 1972 he signed his first contract as a professional singer and moved for two years to Angola. In 1974, he returned to Mozambique and was actively in the African Music Association. After Independence, Wazimbo worked with the big band of the national radio station, Radio Mocambique (RM). He became the lead vocalist of Orchestra Marrabenta Star de Moçambique in 1979 and worked with various members from RM's big band. Led by Wazimbo, Orchestra Marrabenta Star de Moçambique developed a full and funky style of marrabenta featuring electric guitars, powerful horn lines and soulful vocals.

After becoming extremely popular at home in Mozambique, they toured in Europe and released two CDs on Germany's Piranha record label. Both showcased a varied mix of dance styles plus the occasional, strikingly soulful ballad. The 1990s saw a return to peace in Mozambique, but by then there were no recording studios or music venues, and the group finally disbanded in 1995.

== Trademark song and international success ==
One of the most famous works of this artist is the ballad "Nwahulwana" ("night bird"), first released in 1988. The song was featured in a Microsoft commercial in California, and in 2001 was part of the soundtrack for the movie The Pledge (directed by Sean Penn and starring Jack Nicholson).

In the song, Wazimbo expresses sadness at the lifestyle of a wonderful young lady, whom he refers to as "his sister - Maria", wasting her life having a different man every night. An excerpt from the song can be translated as: "You are a night bird, moving after dark from bar to bar."

== Selected discography ==
- 2001 CD Nwahulwana (Piranha CD-PIR 1572), with Orchestra Marrabenta Star de Moçambique
- 1996 CD Marrabenta Piquenique (Piranha CD-PIR 1043)
- 1989 CD IndepenDance (Piranha CD-PIR 15)

== Sources ==
- National Geographic world music
- Mbila
- Lusosphere-Mozambique
