= Joe Morris (songwriter) =

- Born: 1966 (age 58–59); Palapye, Botswana
- Instruments: Drums; guitar; keyboard; piano

Joseph Morris was born in Palapye, Botswana in 1966. His interest in music started early, playing the drums by the age of 8, later on guitar at 12, subsequently keyboards and piano at 14. He currently owns a home recording studio (Drum Boy Recording Studio) and has produced as many as 30 albums. One of his highlights was the release of the hit song "Ditlhopho Di Tsile" in 2004, a self-produced and performed song commissioned by Botswana's Independent Electoral Commission to advertise national elections in a bid to reduce voter apathy. An earlier hit was "Ntsha Nkgo" with Kast, a Hip Hop/Folk song released in 2003.

He has played a role in nurturing Botswana's infantile record industry, with noticeable work in not only his own productions but also with people like Socca Moruakgomo and the "Khalahari" afro jazz album, the birth of the pop group Davet Crew and Kast to name a few.
