= Fany Pfumo =

Fany Pfumo (also spelled Fany Mpfumo) (Lourenço Marques, October 18, 1928 – Maputo, November 3, 1987) was a Mozambican-born singer who was mainly active in South Africa. He is considered one of the founders and of the prominent artists in the marrabenta style scene. Born to a poor family, he started his career playing an "oil tin guitar" in Maputo's suburbs but later moved to South Africa in search of a better living. In Johannesburg, Pfumo had the opportunity to record with His Master's Voice, achieving international fame with songs such as Loko ni kumbuka Jorgina ("When I remember Georgina"); this one, in particular, remains one of the best known songs of marrabenta and Mozambican pop music. After achieving international fame in South Africa, Pfumo eventually returned to Mozambique.

Pfumo's trademark style is characterized by the mix of marrabenta rhythms with jazz elements as well as influences of South African kwela music. He played in a number of bands during the 1950s and 1960s but also recorded several solo singles.

== Partial discography ==
=== Singles ===
Pfumo's singles include:

- Leswi Wene Unga Xonga
- Famba Ha Hombe
- A Vasati Va Lomu

== Compilations ==
- Nyoxanine
