= Bracongo =

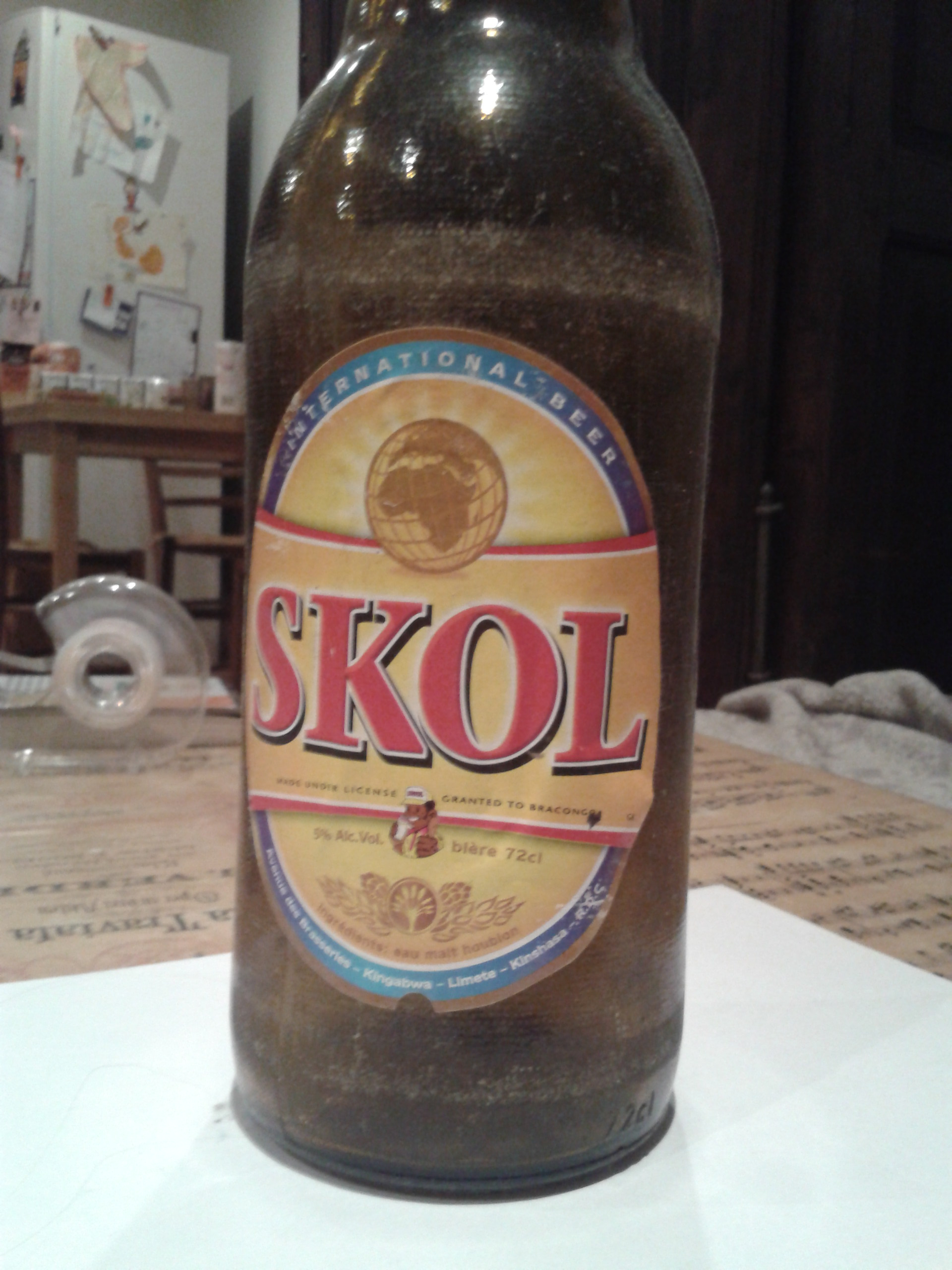
- Skol is Bracongo's flagship beer brand
- Interactive map of Bracongo
- Location: Democratic Republic of the Congo Avenue des Brasseries, N° 7666, Kingabwa, Limete, Kinshasa
- Opened: 1949; 77 years ago
- Annual production volume: Alcoholic beverages; soft drinks; mineral waters
- Parent: Société des Brasseries et Glacières Internationales (BGI)
- Website: https://bracongo.cd/

Bracongo (acronym for "Brasseries du Congo" or "Boissons rafraîchissantes du Congo") is a brewery in the Democratic Republic of the Congo with its headquarters in Limete, Kinshasa. Bracongo belongs to the Société des Brasseries et Glacières Internationales (BGI) that maintains breweries in several African countries. BGI belongs to the French Groupe Castel.

Bracongo was founded in 1949 and fused with three other breweries in 1961, then named Unibra - Congo. The company was renamed Bracongo in 1997. Bracongo's major brand is Skol, a brand also brewed in many other countries. Other beers are Beaufort Lager, Doppel Munich, 33 Export, Tembo, Nkoyi, and Castel Beer. The company also sells other drinks such as wine, soft drinks, and mineral water. Its main competitor in the DRC is Bralima

== History ==
=== 1949–1959: Stanleyville Brewery and Unibra ===
Founded in 1949 under General Alfred Dupont, the Stanleyville Brewery (Brasserie de Stanleyville), now located in Kisangani, saw its main facility inaugurated in December 1951 under General Alfred Lefranc. This was followed by the creation of several additional breweries: in Luluabourg (now Kananga) in July 1953, in Léopoldville (now Kinshasa) in July 1954, and in Paulis (now Isiro) in December 1957. These four breweries initially operated as separate and autonomous companies. On 14 October 1959, Michel Relecom succeeded General Lefranc as president of the four breweries shortly after his death. The breweries were subsequently unified under the name Union des Brasseries (Unibra), a merger that facilitated the sharing of personnel, equipment, and financial resources, which thus improved efficiency and reduced operating costs.

=== 1961–1996: Unibra-Congo, Unibra, capital expansion, and ownership changes ===
On 5 December 1961, Unibra-Congo was established as a Congolese limited liability company and registered on 14 December 1961 in the commercial registry at the clerk's office of the Court of First Instance of Léopoldville. Its statutes were published in the Moniteur Congolais (1962, issue no. 32, tenth section). The company's initial capital was set at 680 million Belgian francs, equivalent to 1,275,000 old Congolese francs. With the country's transition to the Republic of Zaire on 27 October 1971, the company revised its statutes during an extraordinary general meeting held on 20 November 1971, which adopted the name Unibra. Its capital was increased to 1,100,000 zaires and divided into 175,000 shares. Other capital increases followed, notably in February 1973 when it rose from 3,867,000 to 4,400,000 zaires, and later to 5,200,000 zaires through the issuance of 265,000 additional shares without nominal value. On 1 January 1975, in line with government policies aimed at Zairianisation and the subsequent radicalization of foreign-owned small businesses and large enterprises, the state appointed a General Delegate to oversee the company's management. In January 1976, a first retrocession measure restored 40% of the company's shares to former owners, which allowed them to appoint management, and by April 1976, the state appointed a representative of the principal shareholders as Chairman of the Board, which led to the abolition of the General Delegate position. In September of the same year, a second retrocession restored the capital structure to its pre-radicalization distribution. In December 1980, the issuance of 1,400,000 shares increased the company's capital to 5,200,000 zaires. These shares carried no nominal value, and the operation generated a premium of 5,075,120 zaires, which was placed in a non-distributable reserve account. After a capital increase authorized by Ordinance-Law No. 81/046 of 14 March 1981, the total number of shares rose to 3,115,025. In December 1984, subject to approval by the head of state, capital was further increased from 9,460,000 to 18,099,530 zaires through the issuance of 141,960 additional shares without nominal value, which generated a premium of 7,962,517 zaires and brought the total number of shares to 3,251,590.

After the monetary reform of December 1993 introduced the New Zaire (NZ), the share capital of 118,099,530 zaires was converted to 39 NZ. The unexpected death of President Michel Relecom on 6 December 1994 in Brussels triggered, fourteen months later, a complete restructuring of the company's shareholding. In 1995, Pierre Castel acquired the company, and in February 1996, his group, Brasseries et Glacières Internationales (BGI), purchased all shares of Unibra through affiliated entities. On 14 February 1996, an extraordinary general meeting acknowledged the resignation of directors representing the new shareholders. A subsequent meeting on 24 May 1996 approved several measures, including the merger of Société des Brasseries de Kinshasa (SBK) into Unibra through absorption, the conditional effectiveness of the merger upon state authorization leading to SBK's liquidation, and the renaming of the company to Union Nouvelle des Brasseries du Zaïre (UNOBRA), while retaining the acronym Unibra. On 25 May 1996, Pierre Castel inaugurated a new brewery in Mbuji-Mayi in the presence of Michel Relecom, following the decline of a key market in Kisangani. At the same time, Unibra transferred its industrial installations and Skol brand clientele to Bralima for a nominal price of one new zaire (1 NZR), with Bralima committing to absorb the entire Unibra workforce.

=== 1997–present: Renaming to Bracongo ===
On 17 May 1997, a major political transition took place with the fall of the Mobutu Sese Seko regime and the accession of President Laurent-Désiré Kabila. The country was subsequently renamed the Democratic Republic of the Congo. In response to this change, an extraordinary general meeting of shareholders held on 30 May 1997 approved, subject to presidential authorization, the renaming of the company to Brasseries du Congo (Bracongo). In 2007, the company transferred its Tshilenge plants located in Mbuji-Mayi and Kananga to Boissons Rafraichissantes Simba (Brasimba).

== Organization and administration ==
Bracongo operates four sites: Kananga, Isiro (closed), Mbuji-Mayi, and Kinshasa. The inland facilities are managed by directors supported by financial controllers, while Kinshasa, as the main headquarters, serves as the central administrative hub. It supervises and coordinates the accounting of all other sites, where financial statements are prepared before consolidation.

Administratively, the general assembly serves as the highest authority, which represents all shareholders, defines policy, and convenes annually to assess the implementation of decisions and determine future strategic directions, while also approving financial statements. The board of directors is responsible for overseeing the company management, with members including a president, vice president, managing director, general director, and statutory auditors, who all serve renewable one-year terms. Daily operations are handled by general management through a management committee, which ensures the execution of administrative decisions and exercises disciplinary authority over employees, subject to board approval. The statutory auditor monitors governance through audits and advisory functions. Supporting departments include Technical, Operations, Finance, and Administrative and Human Resources divisions.

== Products and Skol advertising posters ==
=== Products ===
- Beers: Skol, Castel Beer, Beaufort Lager, Tembo, 33 Export, Nkoyi Blonde, and Nkoyi Black
- Soft drinks: Energy drinks, Youzou, World Cola, and Top.
- Mineral waters: Eau Vive.

=== Skol advertising posters ===
The 1985 poster, Tonton Skol Tembe Nye, reflects a period when advertising primarily relied on hand-drawn illustrations rather than photography. It was produced using textured paper, pencil lines, brushes, and gouache. The central character, Tonton Skol, became a charismatic and symbolic figure representing the brand throughout the 1980s and 1990s, while his slogan Tembe Nye came to signify success and enjoyment in social settings.

The 2012 poster, Na Skol Esimbi, depicts a group of young people composed of three women and two men, aged between 20 and 25. A young man in the foreground holds a glass of beer and gestures that everything is fine, while the rest of the group stands behind him at a 90-degree angle, each presenting a bottle of Skol. The scene accentuates the pleasure of social gatherings, reinforced by a yellow-toned background that conveys joy, quality, and warmth.

The 2014 campaign Entre Nous Ça Skol portrays a group of young people composed of three women and three men, smiling and capturing a shared moment, as if taking a photo together on a weekend evening in Kinshasa around 7:00 p.m.

In 2016, the poster Molangi ya Mboka introduces a dual visual structure that juxtaposes past and present, with the monochrome section recalling the 1980s Zaire era, while the color section shows a more modern aesthetic. This contrast conveys a message that Skol has been around for a long time and is still enjoyed today.

The 2018 poster, Tozo Regner, takes a more dynamic and contextualized approach by incorporating elements of urban realism in Kinshasa, including a street vendor, a jeep, and the Limete Interchange. According to Divin-Sky Kayanga, a visual artist at the Académie des Beaux-Arts, although the depiction of informal beer sales is somewhat fictional, it effectively captures the liveliness and authenticity of the city.

In 2019, the poster, Tozo Regner, portrays a typical Kinshasa scene, with a group of young people laughing together over beer, alongside informal markets and street vendors.
