= Bernard Nguene =

Senegalese footballer (born 2001)

Personal information
- Date of birth: 4 August 2006 (age 20)
- Place of birth: Cameroon
- Height: 1.78 m (5 ft 10 in)
- Position: Forward

Team information
- Current team: Standard Liège
- Number: 26

Youth career
- Brasseries du Cameroun
- 2024–2025: Nice

Senior career*
Years	Team	Apps	(Gls)
2025–2026	Nice	7	(0)
2026	→ Standard Liège (loan)	1	(0)
2026–	Standard Liège	13	(1)
- * Club domestic league appearances and goals as of 31 May 2026

Bernard Nguene (born 4 August 2006) is a Cameroonian professional football player who plays as a forward for Belgian Pro League club Standard Liège.

== Club career ==
Nguene is a product of the youth academy of the Cameroonian club Brasseries du Cameroun. On 9 September 2024, he transferred to OGC Nice on a contract until 2028, originally assigned to their U19s. He made his senior and professional debut with Nice as a substitute in a 2–1 Ligue 1 loss to LOSC Lille on 17 January 2025.

On 19 January 2026, Nguene joined Standard Liège in Belgium on loan with an option to buy. Just two weeks later, after Nguene made his debut, his transfer to Standard Liège was made permanent and he signed a two-and-a-half-season contract with the club.

== International career ==
In July 2024, Nguene was called up to the Cameroon U20s for a set of friendlies.

== Playing style ==
Nguene is a forward who can play as a winger or striker He is not particularly physical or defensive, but enjoys possession of the ball and can play with his back to the goal. He is an adept dribbler, and has good acceleration and aerial skills.

== Career statistics ==
As of match played 11 January 2026

Appearances and goals by club, season and competition
Club	Season	League			Cup		Europe		Other		Total	
Club	Season	Division	Apps	Goals	Apps	Goals	Apps	Goals	Apps	Goals	Apps	Goals
Nice	2024–25	Ligue 1	1	0	—		—		—		1	0
Nice	2025–26	Ligue 1	6	0	2	0	4 (Note: Two appearances in UEFA Champions League, two appearances in UEFA Europa League)	0	—		12	0
Career total			7	0	2	0	4	0	0	0	13	0
