= Brarudi Brewery =

Burundian beverage company

Brarudi
- Native name: Brasseries et Limonaderies du Burundi
- Company type: Private
- Industry: Brewing
- Founded: 1955; 71 years ago
- Headquarters: Boulevard Ndadaye Melchior, BP 540 Bujumbura
- Area served: Burundi
- Key people: Laurent Bukasa Nsenda, CEO
- Products: Beer, soft drinks
- Number of employees: 500 (2013)
- Parent: Heineken
- Website: Homepage

Brarudi S.A., also known as by its French name Brasseries et Limonaderies du Burundi, is the largest brewer and soft beverage company in the Republic of Burundi.

== History ==
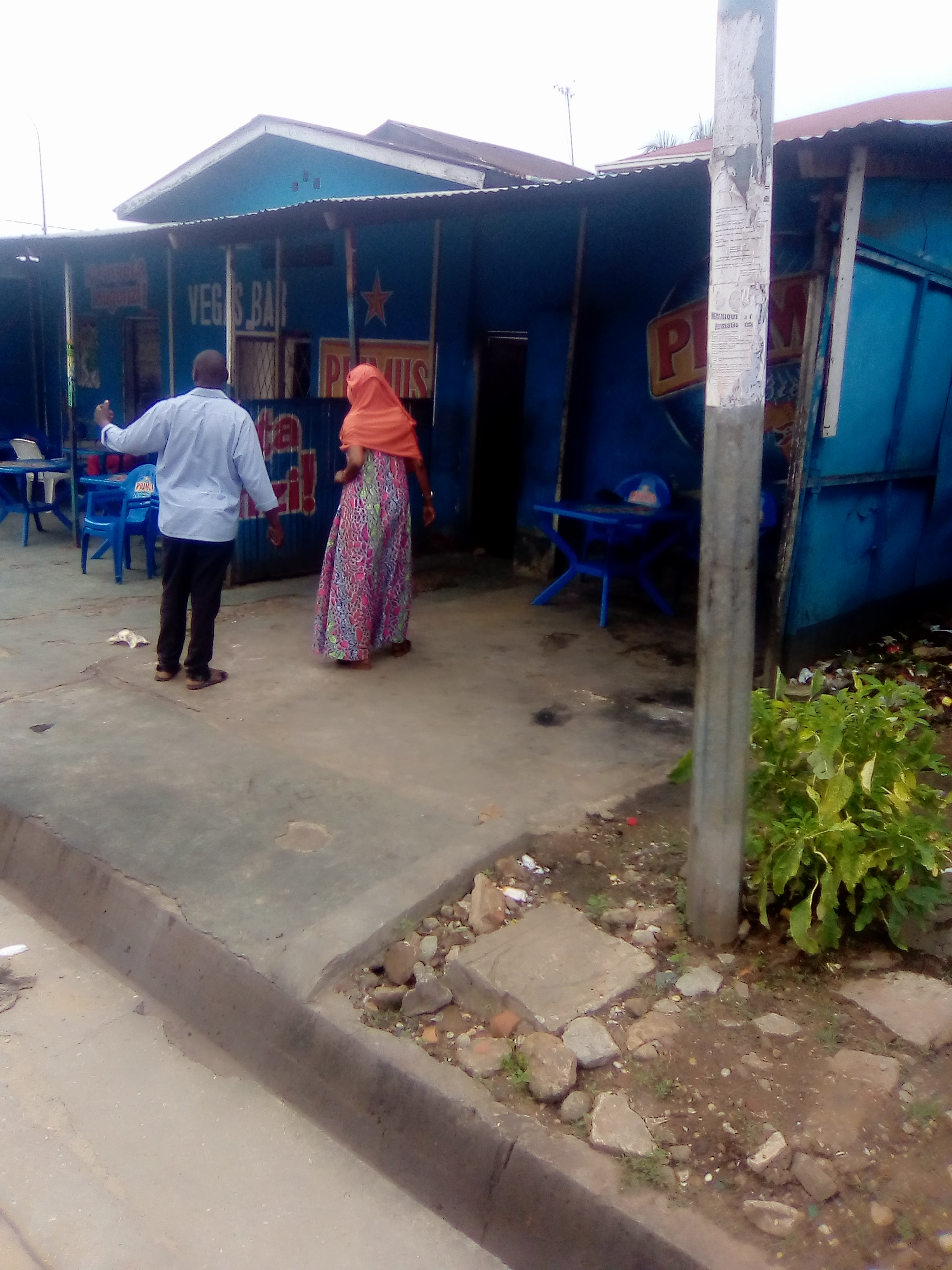
A Brarudi bar restaurant in Bwiza

The history of Brarudi goes back to 1955, when the management of the breweries of the Belgian Congo, then under the management of Brasseries de Leopoldville (now Bralima Brewery), decided to build a brewery in the Eastern region to server Ruanda-Urundi and Eastern Congo. The city of Usumbura (now Bujumbura), on the northern shores of Lake Tanganyika, was selected to house the new brewery, Brasserie du Rwanda-Urundi. The brewery became operational on December 23, 1955 and began producing Primus Beer.

In November 1957, Bralima started construction on a second brewery in Gisenyi on the northern shores of Lake Kivu under the name Brasseries et Limonaderies du Rwanda.

Upon the country's independence, Bralima was incorporated in Congo Léopoldville, Brarudi in Burundi and Bralirwa in Rwanda.

In 1966, Brarudi diversified into the production of soft drinks. This was through the brewer's partnership with the Coca-Cola Company, making it a bottler for Coca-Cola products. A beverage plant was opened in Gitega for this purpose.

In 1975, the Government of Burundi acquired 40% control of Brarudi while Banque Bruxelles Lambert (BBL) retained its 60% shareholding. BBL exited Brarudi in 1982 through selling its 60% stake to Heineken, a Dutch brewing conglomerate. This made Brarudi a subsidiary of Heineken.

The Moso Sugar Company (SOSUMO) was created on 13 July 1982 as a private law mixed economy company (SARL). The State of Burundi held 21,250 shares, and 100 shares each were held by Brarudi and the Société Burundaise de Financement (SBF).

== Ownership ==
The shares of stock of the company are privately held. The ownership of the company stock is as depicted in the table below:

Brasseries et Limonaderies du Burundi stock ownership
| Rank | Name of owner | Percentage ownership |
|---|---|---|
| 1 | Heineken International | 60.0 |
| 2 | Government of Burundi | 40.0 |
| | Total | 100.0 |

== Brands ==
The brands manufactured by Brarudi include the following.

=== Beers ===
- Amstel
- Heineken
- Maltina (nonalcoholic)
- Primus
- Viva (nonalcoholic)

=== Soft drinks ===
- Coca-Cola
- Fanta
- Schweppes
- Sprite

== See also ==
- List of companies of Burundi
- Economy of Burundi
- Heineken
- Bralima Brewery
- Bralirwa

== Sources ==
- Presentation de la SOSUMO (in French), SOSUMO
