= Mützig =

French beer brand

- Type: Beer, pale lager, premium lager
- Manufacturer: Heineken N.V.
- Alcohol by volume: 5.5% (regular)
- Website: Mützig

Mützig is a beer brand owned by Heineken and its subsidiaries, and was originally brewed in 1810 by Brasserie Mutzig of Alsace, France. It is now a 5.5% ABV lager available in 65cl and 33cl bottles. It has a full-bodied taste and distinctive packaging, and is the most successful premium, locally brewed beer in Central Africa. Mützig is considered a flagship African brand.

Mützig's slogan is "Mützig, the Taste of Success" in English and "Mützig, Le goût de la Réussite" in French.

== Alsace ==
The name Mützig originates from Mutzig, a commune of France located at the entrance of the Bruche river valley, in the Bas-Rhin department in Alsace, in north-eastern France. Brasserie Mutzig was founded in 1810 by Antoine Wagner and the beer was brewed there until the brewery closed in 1989, after merging into Alsacienne de Brasserie (Albra) in 1969, and being acquired by Heineken in 1972. The 1969 merger forming l'Alsacienne de Brasserie (Alsatian Brewery), combined Mutzig with the Alsatian breweries: de l'Espérance, de la Perle, de Colmar, and Haag à Ingwiller. The old Mutzig brewery was bought by the city of Mutzig in 1992. It was designated a historical monument in 2001, renovated in 2009, and now houses a business incubator.

== Mutzig Pils, biere d'Alsace ==
- Morvan, Herve (1949). "Mutzig Pils, La reine des bières d'Alsace". Antique Posters. France. "Stone Lithograph"

Gallery

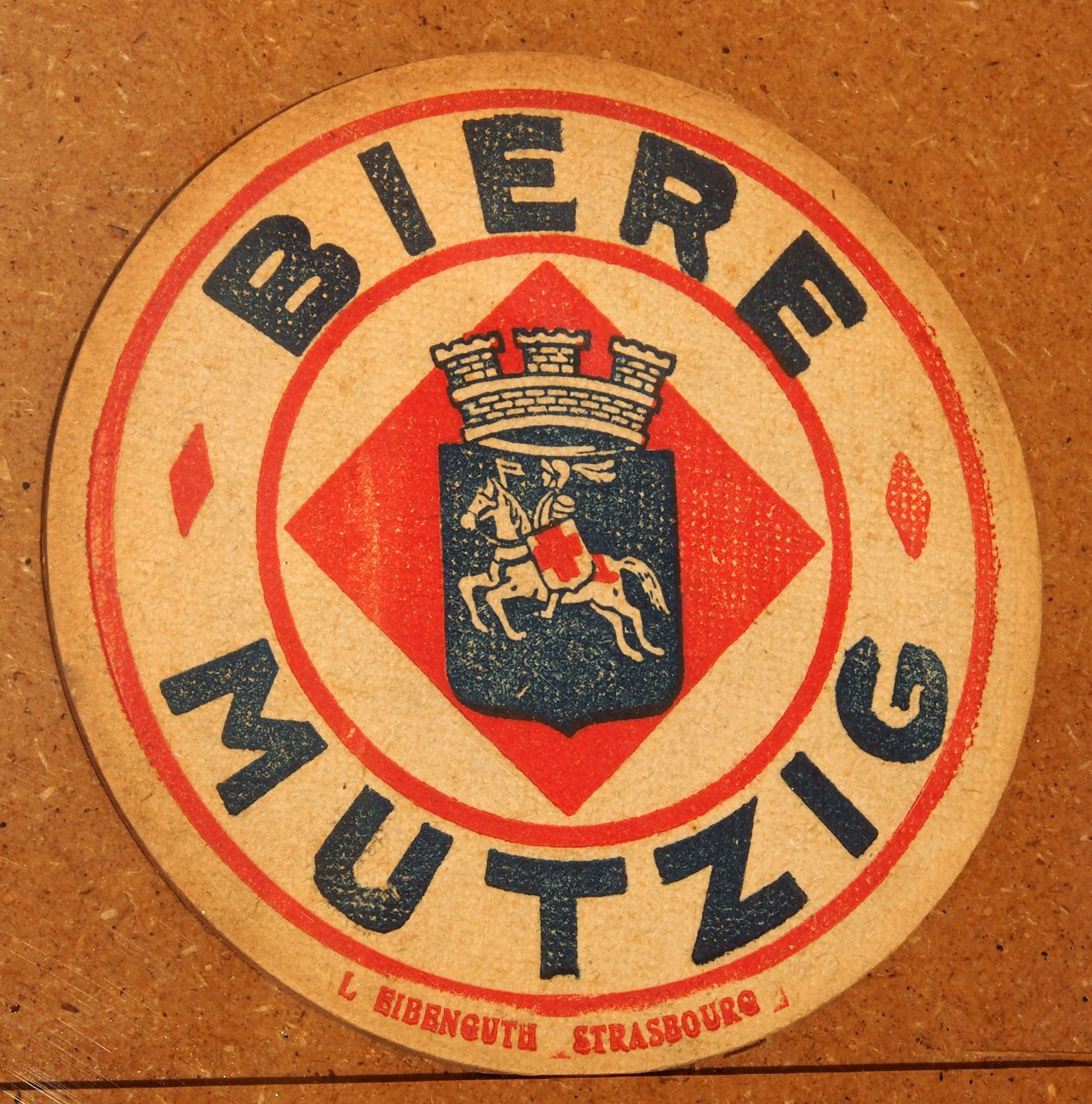

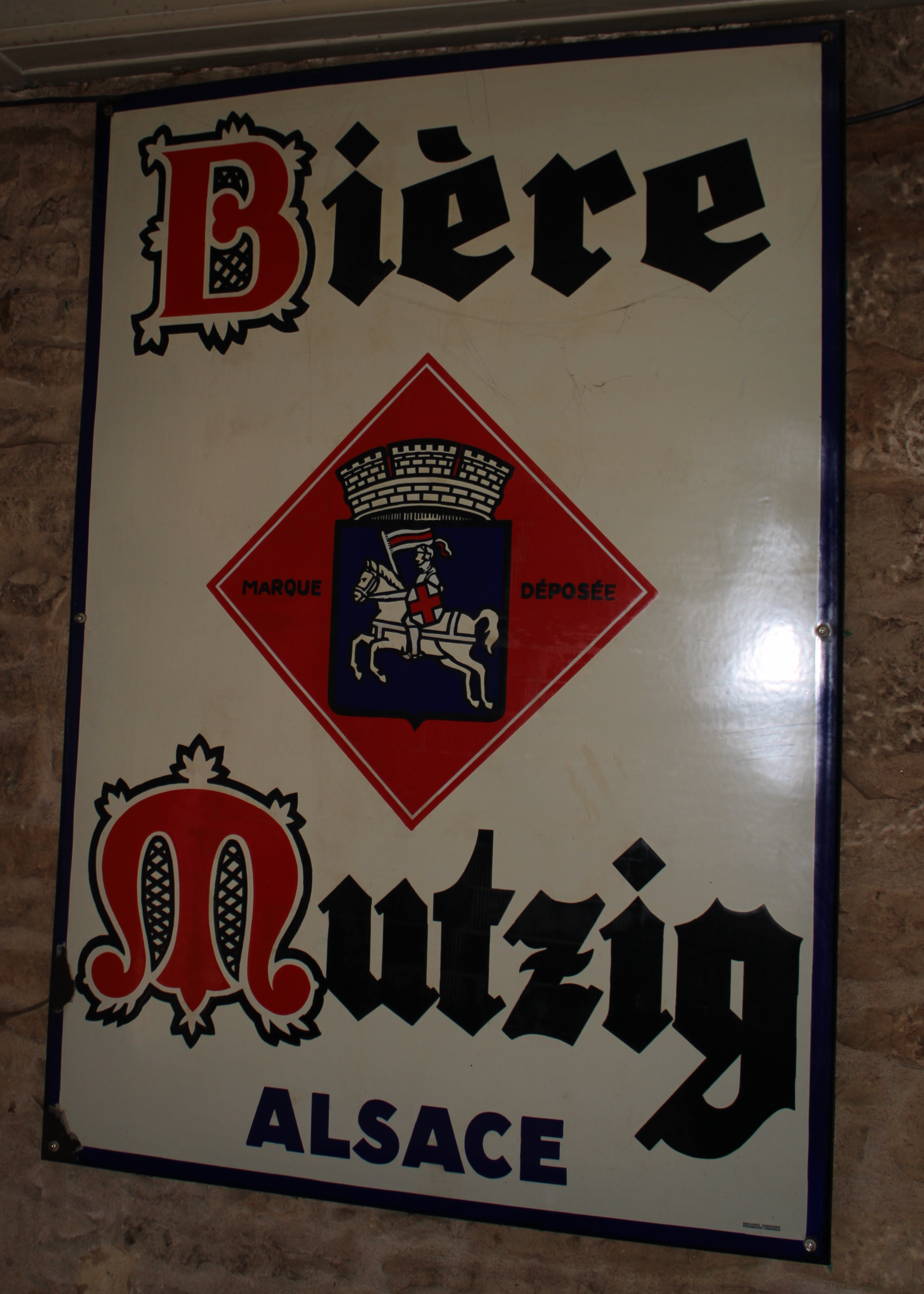

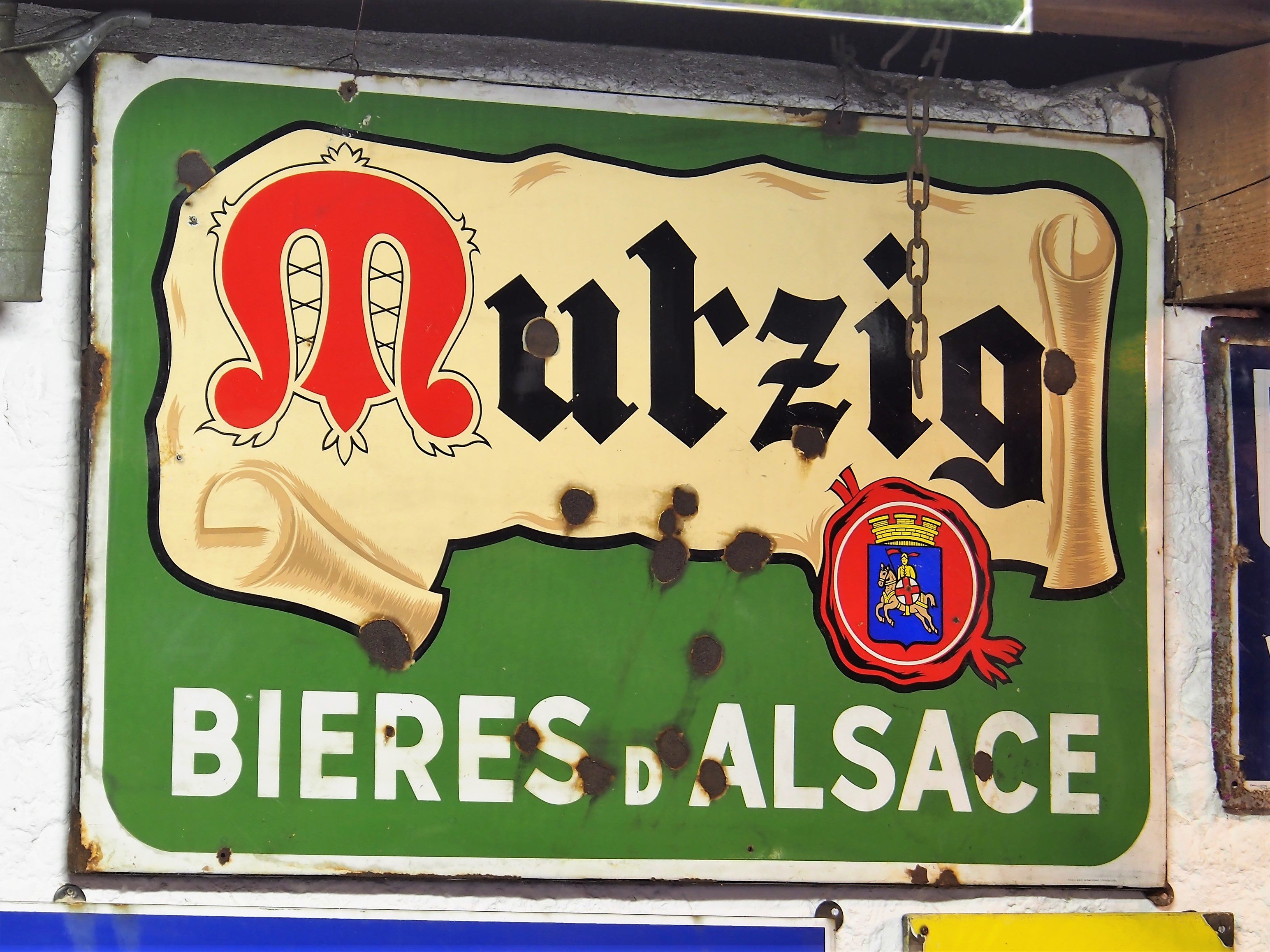

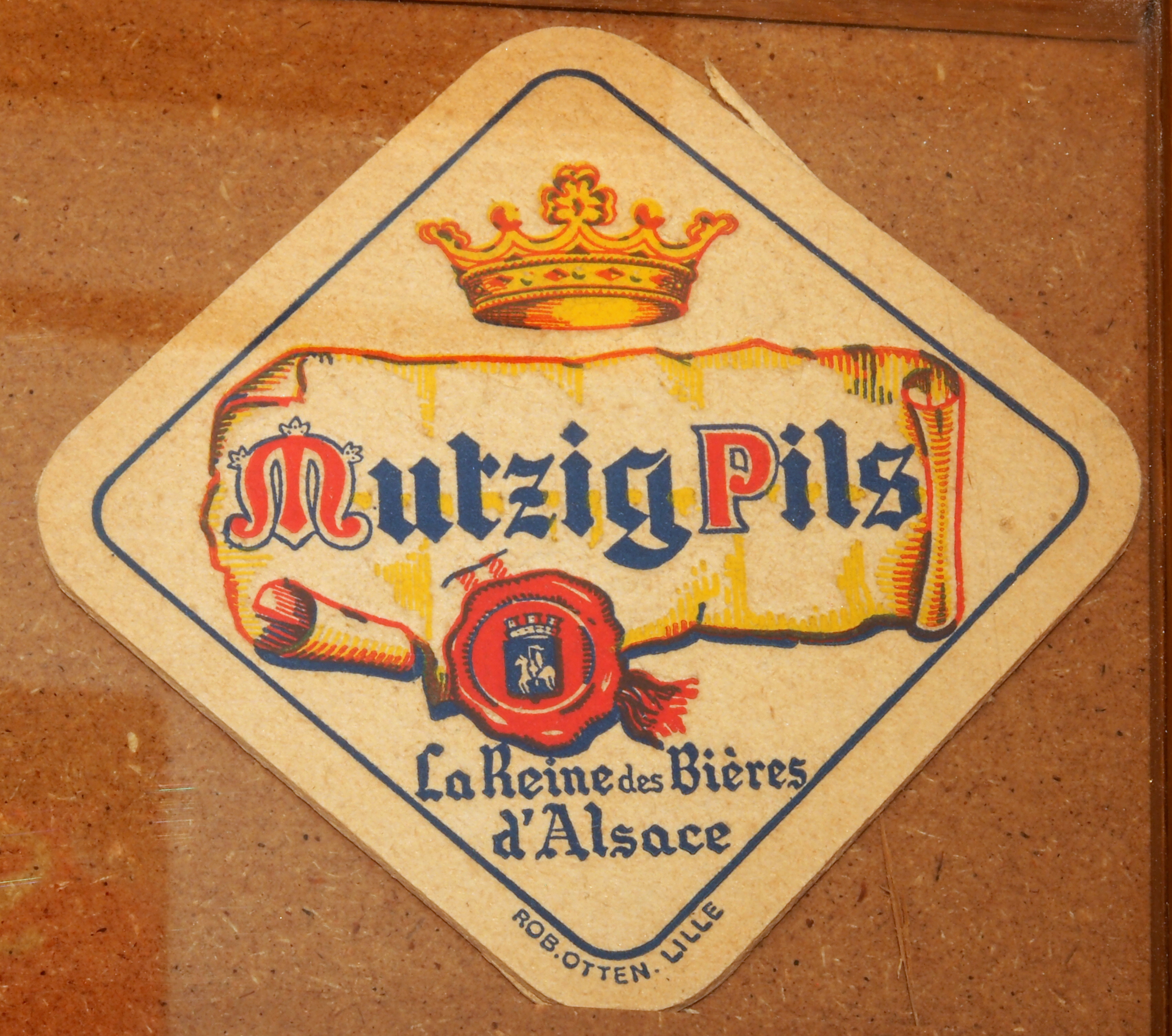

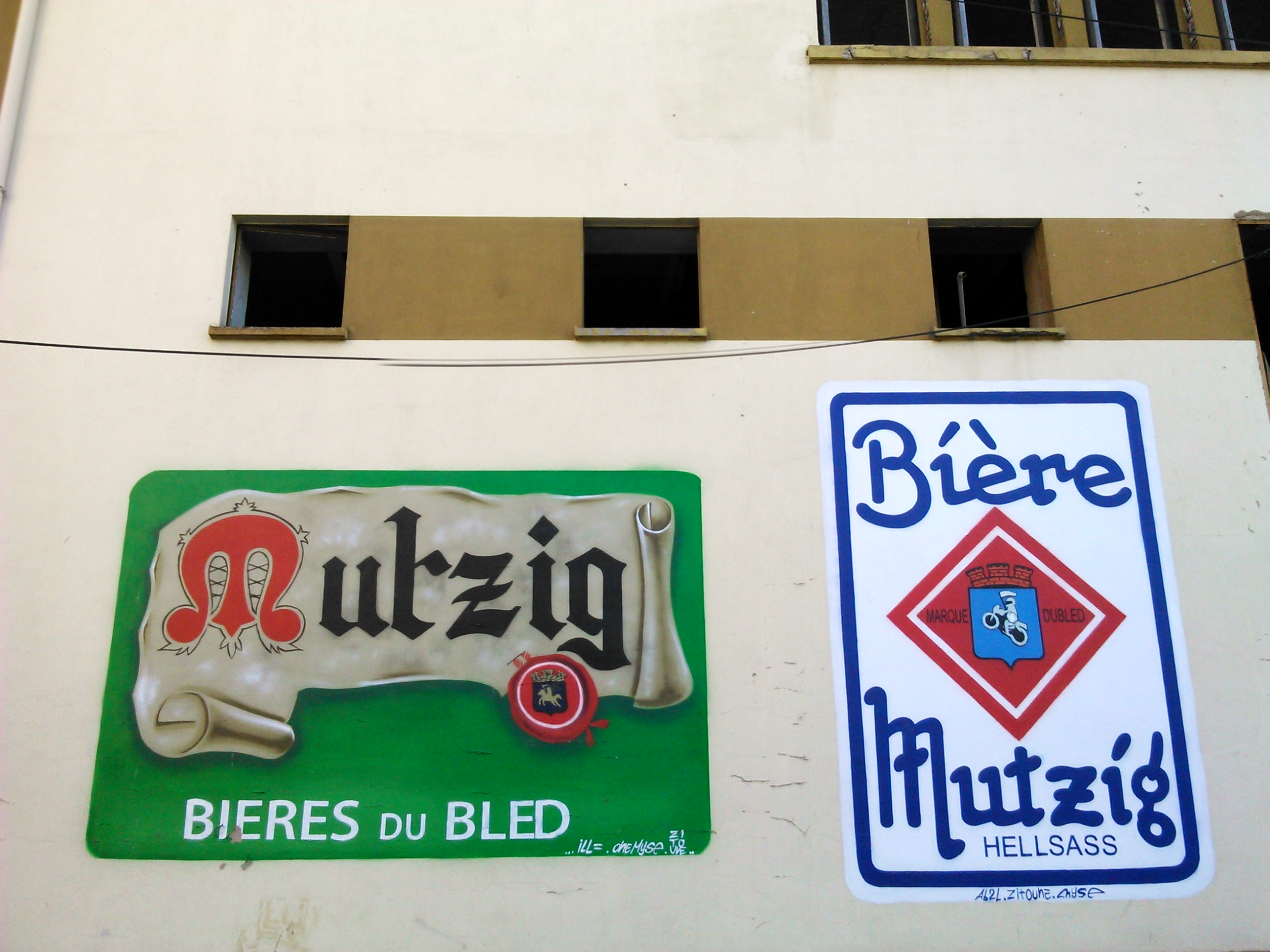
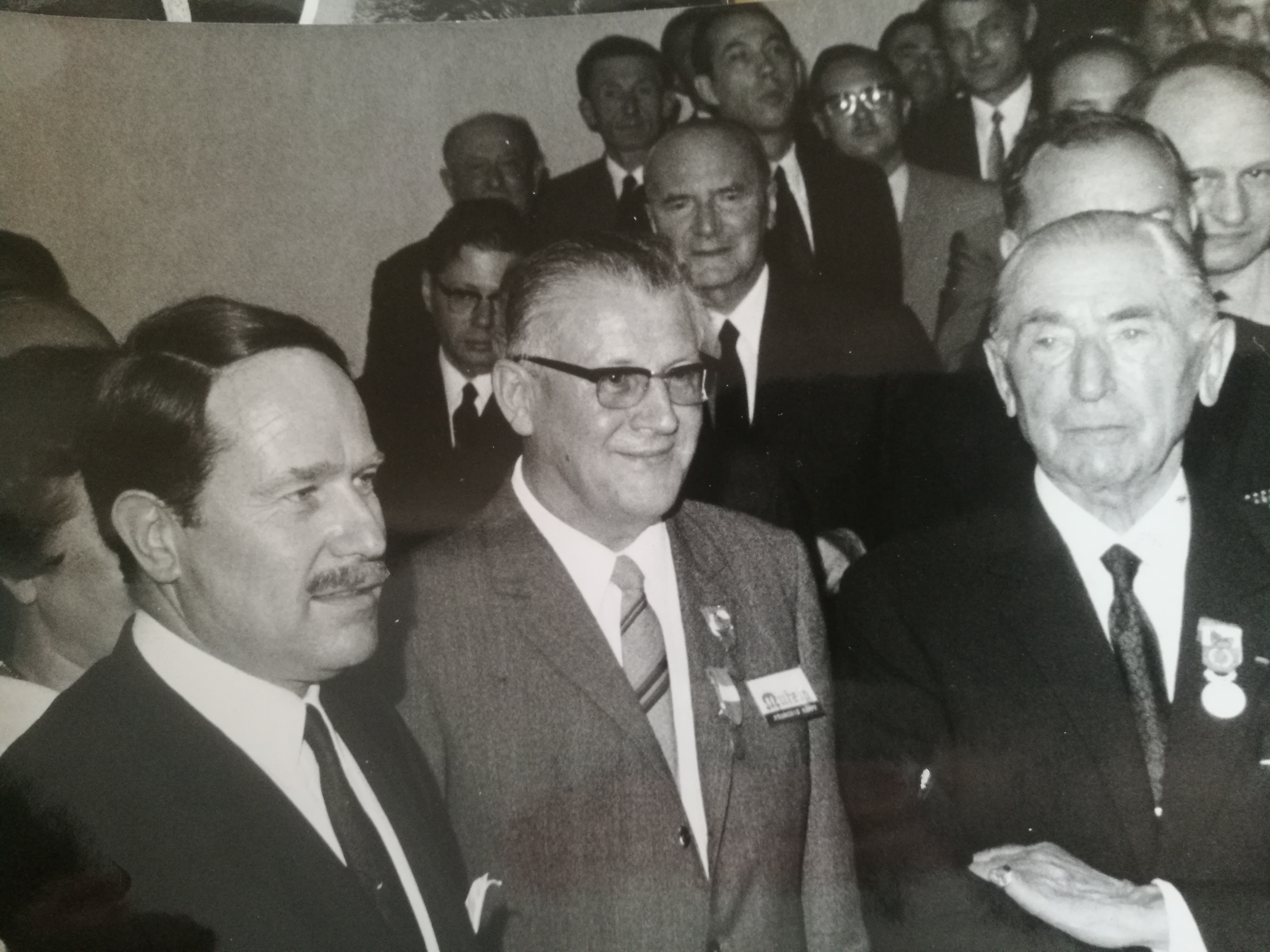

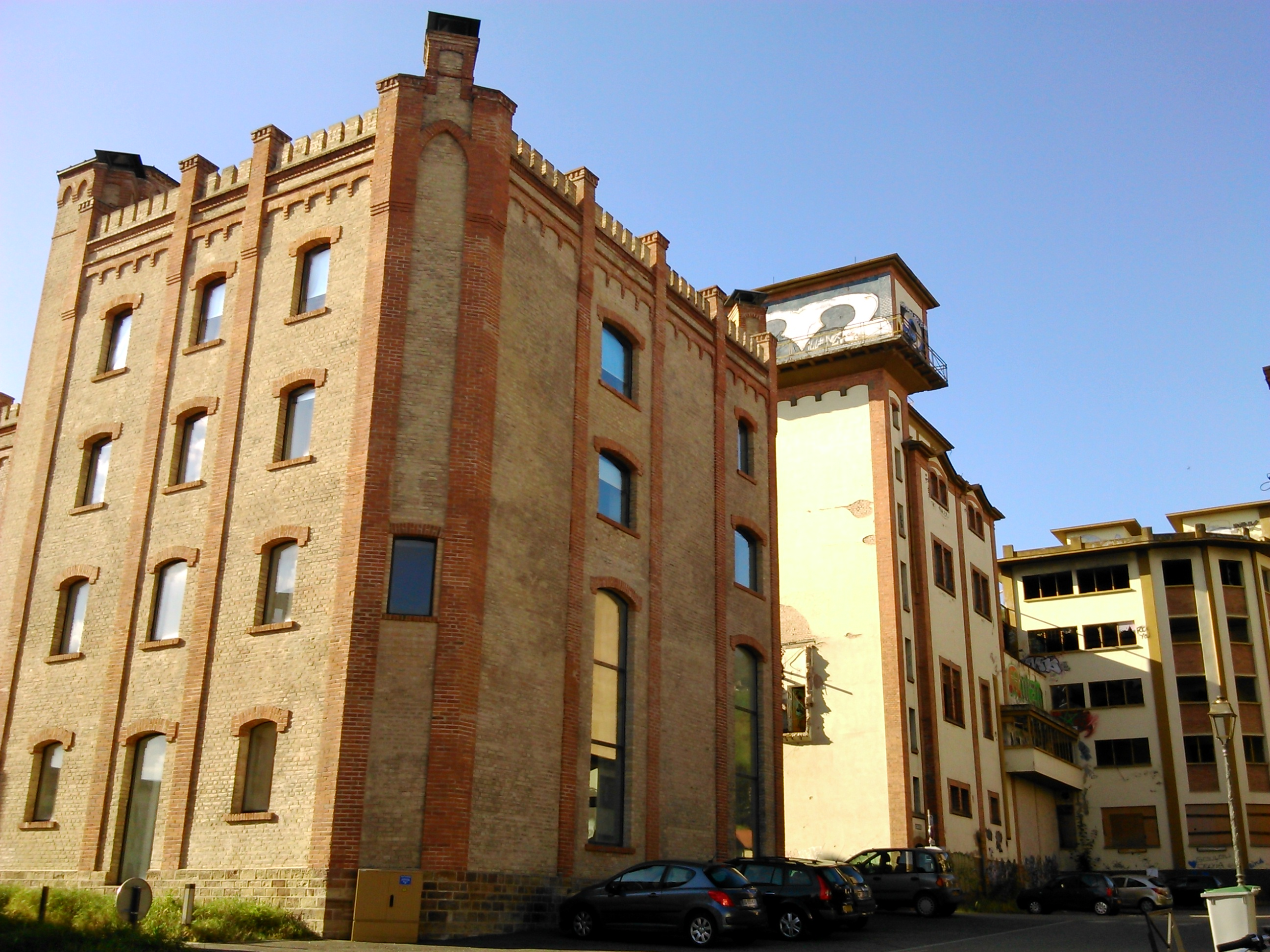

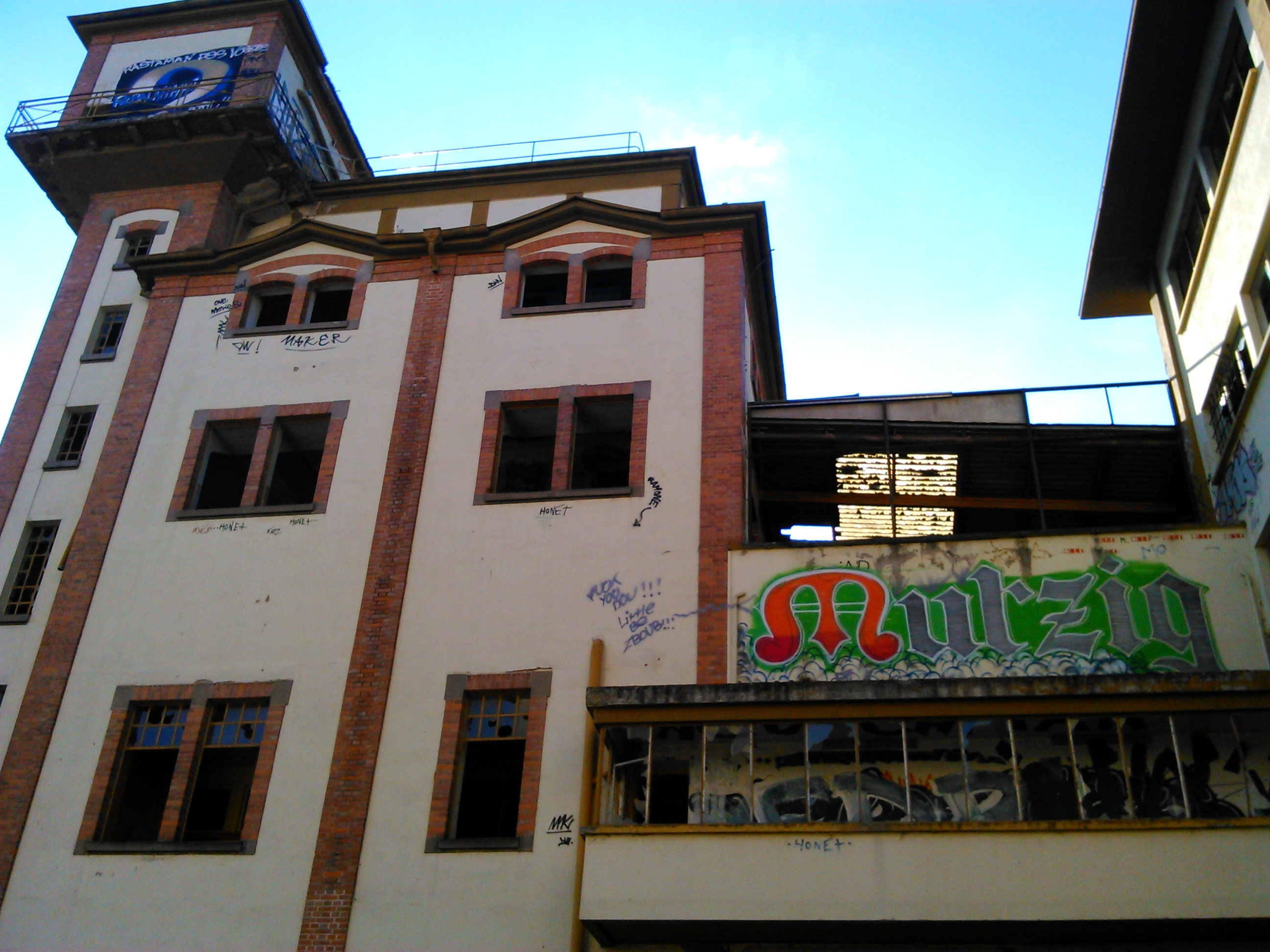

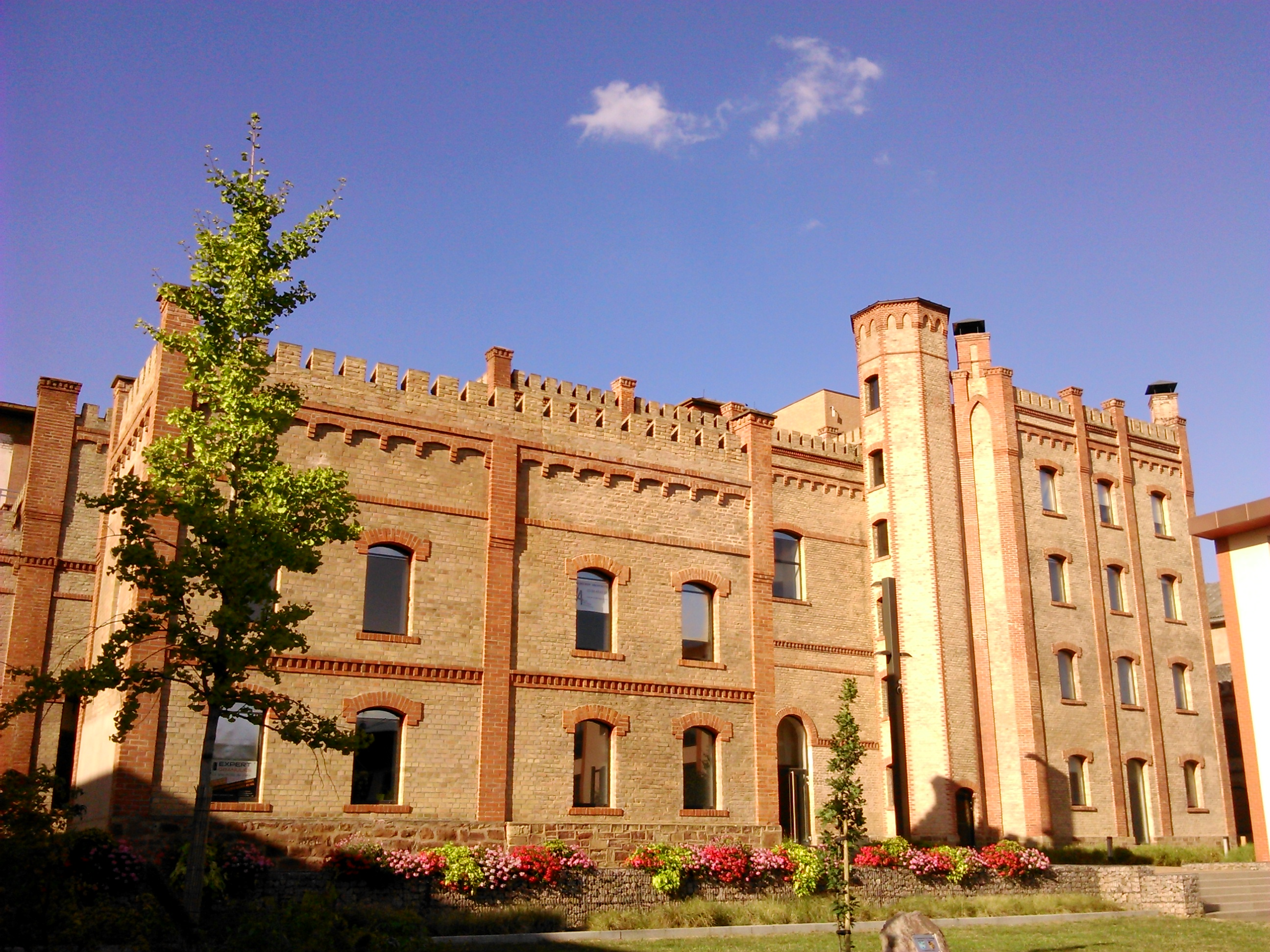
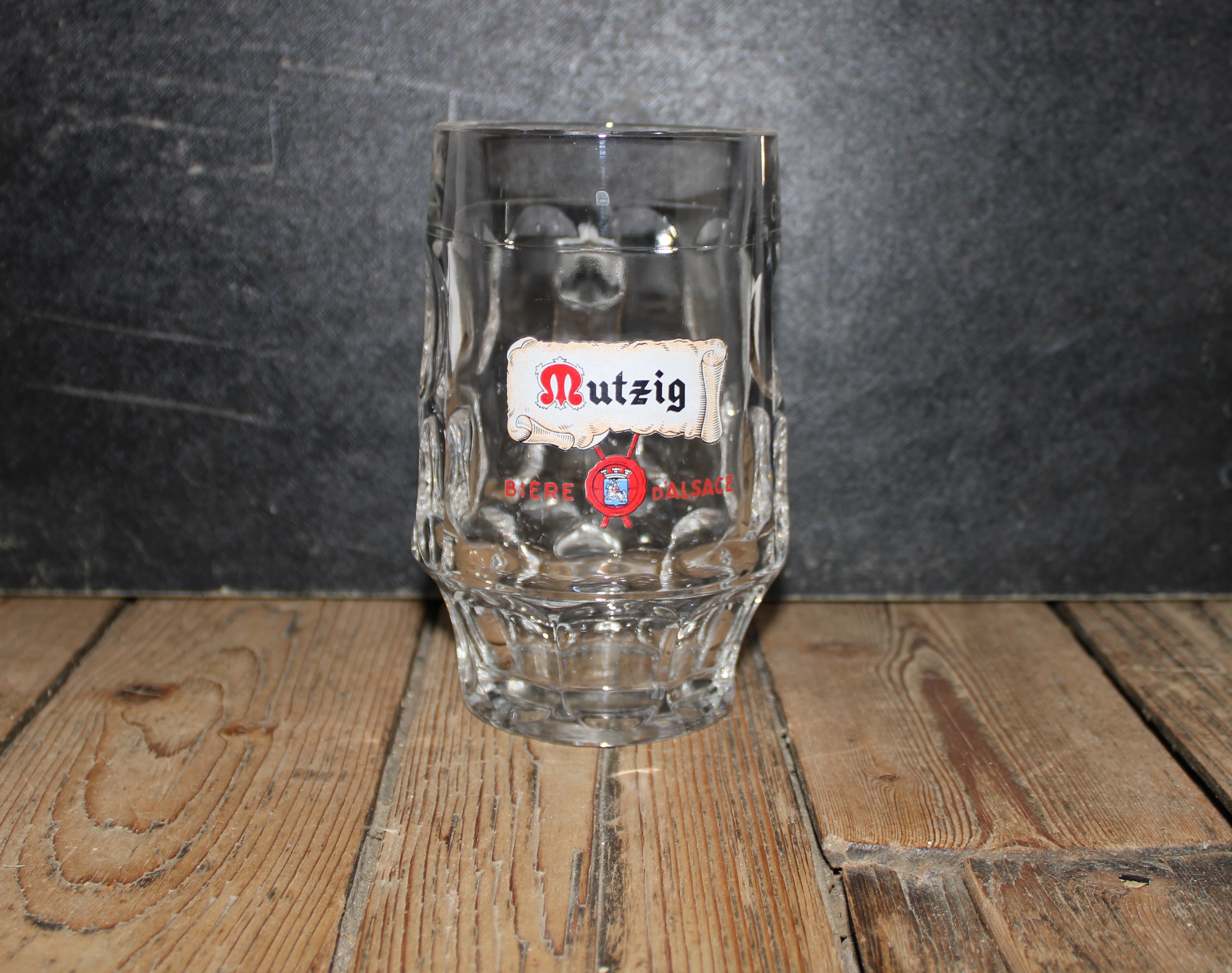

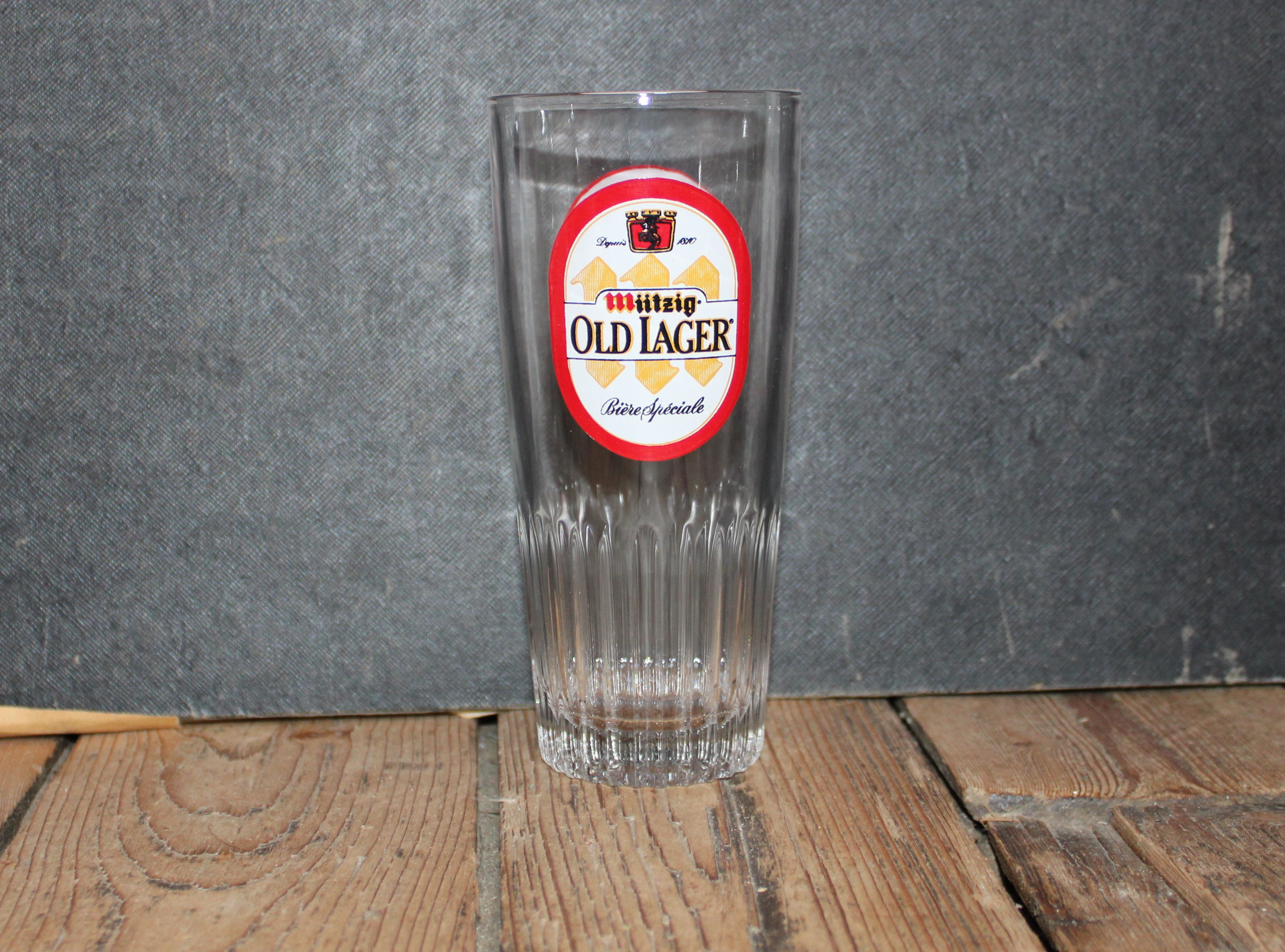

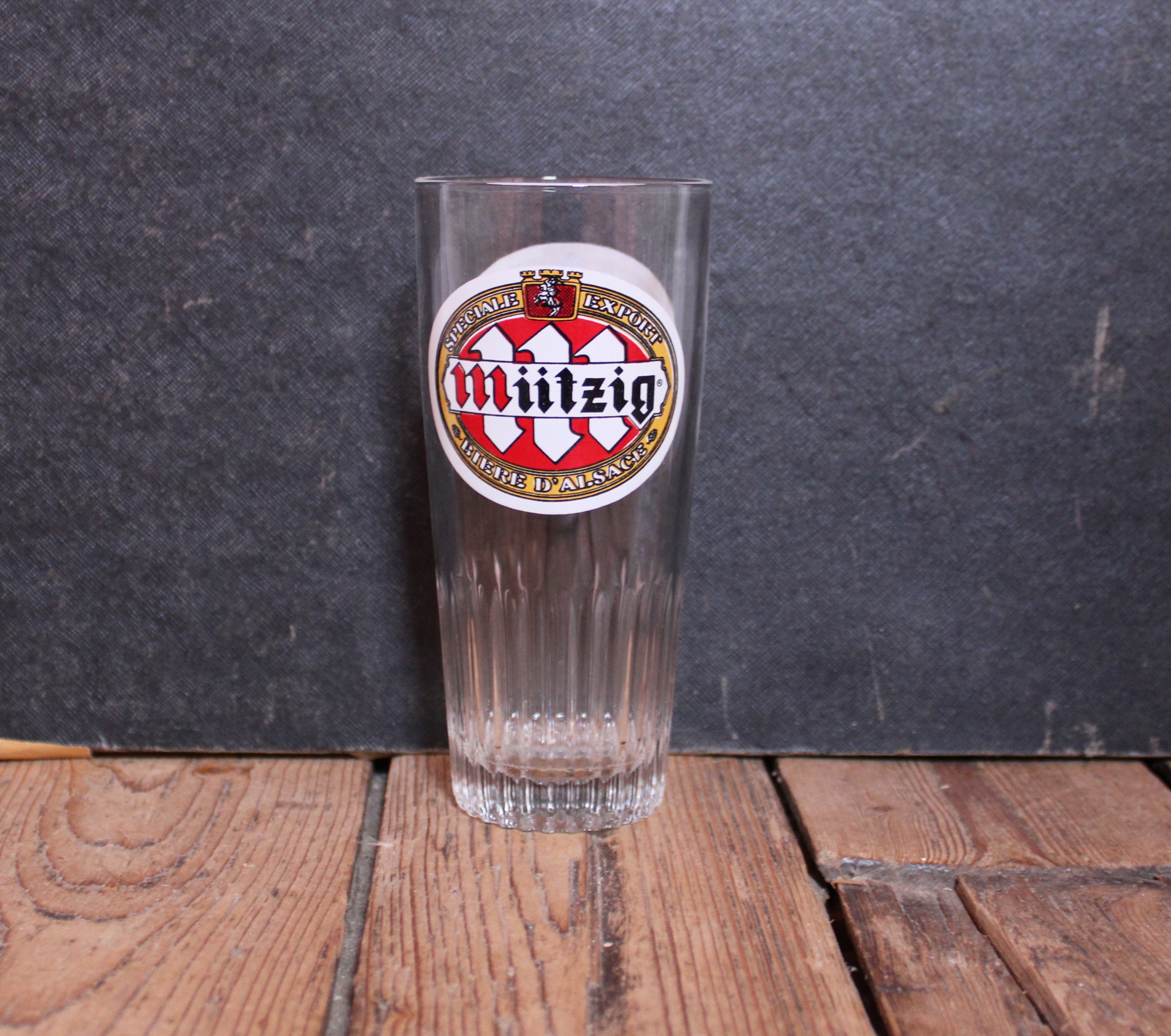

== Africa ==
The spelling of the name was Germanicized with an umlaut for marketing reasons, and Mützig was launched in Africa in 1987 to satisfy the needs of the consumers with a passion for a stronger, yet more refined and bitter tasting beer. It was developed from traditional local methods of sorghum beer fermentation.

The local brewers of Mützig are Bralirwa in Rwanda, Brarudi in Burundi, Brasseries du Cameroun in Cameroon, Brasseries du Congo in the Republic of Congo, Sierra Leone Brewery Limited in Sierra Leone and Bralima in the Democratic Republic of Congo

In Rwanda, Mützig is the most popular beer after Primus, another brand from the same stable, although one survey put Mützig ahead 72% to 69%. It is a more expensive beer than Primus, by some 30%, but cheaper than imported beers. It is packaged in 350 millilitres (12 imp fl oz; 12 US fl oz) and 650 millilitres (23 imp fl oz; 22 US fl oz) bottles. It is branded there as "The Taste of Success".

In Cameroon the beer is produced by Brasseries du Cameroun (Cameroonian Breweries), owned by the French company Castel.

From late 2013 the advertising for Heineken International's Africa brands Mützig and Gulder were handled by M. & C. Saatchi Abel.

Gallery

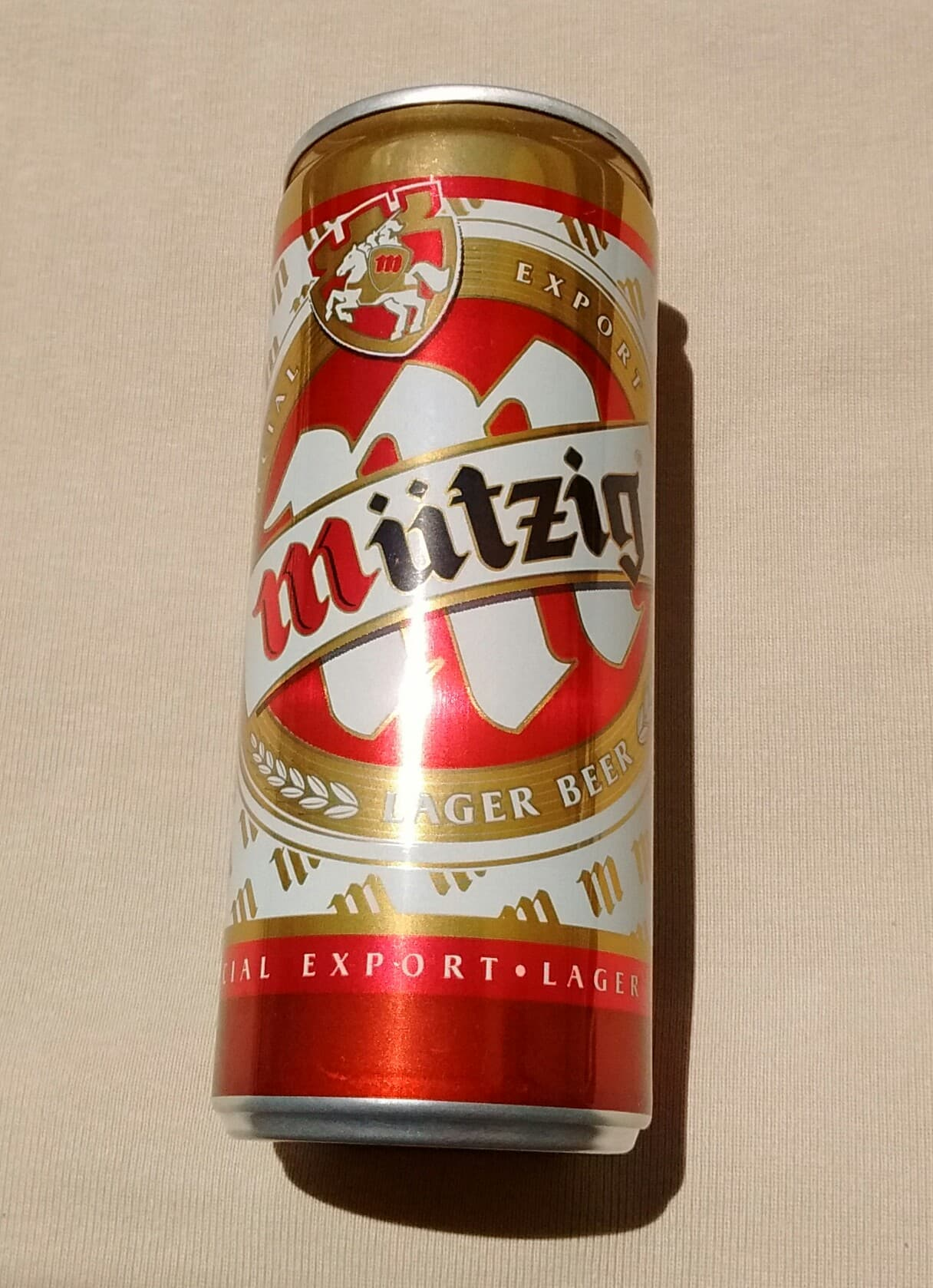

== Specification ==
(Rwanda)

- Gravity: 10.7 ° P
- Alcohol: 4.7% by volume
- Bitterness: 20 EBU
- Colour: 7 EBC

== Sponsorship ==
In Cameroon, Mützig sponsors the Mützig Star national singing competition, which promotes Cameroonian amateur musicians.

In 2015 Mützig was a sponsor of International Fashion week, Kigali, Rwanda.

== See also ==
- Heineken brands
- Heineken International
- Bralirwa
- Brarudi
- Brasseries du Cameroun
- Brasseries du Congo
- Bralima
