= Bralirwa Brewery =

Largest brewer and soft beverage company in Rwanda

Bralirwa
- Type: Public: RSE: BLRW
- Industry: Brewing
- Founded: 1957; 69 years ago
- Headquarters: Kigali, Rwanda
- Key people: Victor Madiela (managing director)
- Products: Beer, soft drinks
- Revenue: RWF:86.35 billion (US$101.2 million) (2017)
- Operating income: RWF:14.7 billion (US$17.24 million) (2017)
- Net income: ▲Aftertax:RWF:5.1 billion (US$5.95 million) (2017).
- Total assets: RWF:127.73 billion (US$149.72 million) (2017)
- Number of employees: 546 (2017)
- Parent: Heineken
- Website: Homepage

Bralirwa, also known by its French name Brasseries et Limonaderies du Rwanda, is the largest brewer and soft beverage company in Rwanda. Its shares of stock are listed on the Rwanda Stock Exchange, where they trade under the symbol BLRW. As of December 2017, the company's total assets were valued at RWF:127.73 billion (approximately US$149.72 million), with shareholders' equity of RWF:35.7 billion (US$41.83 million).

== History ==
The history of Bralirwa goes back to 1957. The management of the breweries of the Congo and Burundi, then under the management of Brasseries de Leopoldville (Brewery of Kinshasa), decided to build another brewery in the Eastern region. The city of Gisenyi, on the northern shores of Lake Kivu, was selected to house the new brewery. Gisenyi was selected for two reasons: it was easily accessible, by water, land and air; and Lake Kivu has a large quantity of proven reserves of methane gas, a source of alternative energy. The brewery became operational in 1959 and began producing Primus beer, the only brand produced until 1987. In 1987, a new premium local beer brand, Mützig was introduced. In 1989, Bralirwa began making Guinness under license.

In 1971, the Heineken Group, a Dutch brewing conglomerate, acquired a 70 percent majority shareholding in Bralirwa. With the acquisition, Bralirwa greatly improved its brewing process.

In 1974, Bralirwa diversified into the production of soft drinks. A soft beverages plant was opened in Kigali, Rwanda's capital and largest city. The brewer partnered with the Coca-Cola Company, which allowed Bralirwa to widen the range of products manufactured.

As of 2018, Bralirwa was a regionally and internationally recognized brewer and soft-beverage manufacturer, with an expanding portfolio of both alcoholic and non-alcoholic beverages.

== Ownership ==
The shares of stock of the company are listed on the Rwanda Stock Exchange (RSE), where they trade under the symbol BLRW. The Heineken Group owns 75 percent of the shares of the company. The remaining 25 percent are owned by individual and institutional investors. In December 2009, the Government of Rwanda successfully divested from the company by selling 5 percent shareholding directly to the Heineken Group and by listing the remaining 25 percent on the RSE, through an initial public offering (IPO). As of December 2017, the ownership of the company stock was as depicted in the table below:

Bralirwa stock ownership
| Rank | Name of owner | Percentage ownership |
|---|---|---|
| 1 | Heineken International | 40.01 |
| 2 | Belegginsmaatschapij BV | 35.00 |
| 3 | Arisaig Africa Consumer Fund Limited | 7.06 |
| 4 | Rwanda Social Security Board | 2.80 |
| 5 | CFC Stanbic Nominees Limited A/C NR13303 | 2.68 |
| 6 | FRB ITF Investec Africa Fund | 2.58 |
| 7 | CFC Stanbic Nominees Limited A/C NR 4262756 | 1.99 |
| 8 | Frontaura Global Frontier Fund LLC | 1.70 |
| 9 | Institutional and private investors via RSE | 5.18 |
| | Total | 100.00 |

== Governance ==
As of December 2017, the members of the board of directors of Bralirwa included the following individuals:

- Boudewijn Haarsma: chairman
- Victor Madiela: managing director
- Chantal Mubarure: non-executive director
- George Gakuba: non-executive director
- John Bosco Sebabi: non-executive director
- Jordi Borrut Bel: non-executive director
- Hubert Eze: non-executive director

== Operations ==
The Bralirwa brewery is located in Gisenyi, approximately 158 kilometres (98 mi), by road, west of Kigali, Rwanda's capital city.

The administrative headquarters of the company is located in Kigali. Also located in Kigali is the Soft Beverages Plant, where Coca-Cola carbonated beverages are manufactured under license. In May 2011, press reports indicated that the company was in the process of establishing a new soft drinks manufacturing line at the company's plant in Kicukiro, a suburb of Kigali, and upgrading its brewing plant in Gisenyi.

== Brands ==
The brands manufactured by Bralirwa include:

Beers

- Primus
- Primus Citron
- Turbo King
- Huza
- Mützig, a 5.5% ABV lager; launched in 1987.
- Mützig Lite
- Heineken
- Amstel
- Legend

Soft drinks

- Coca-Cola
- Coca-Cola-Zero
- Fanta: Orange, Citron, Fiesta, Pineapple
- Sprite
- Krest Tonic
- Soda-Water
- Cheetah-Energy-drink
