= 10 Congolese Franc bill =

Banknote of the DRC

10 Congolese Franc (CDF) bill
- Country: Democratic Republic of the Congo
- Value: 10 FC
- Material used: 75% cotton, 25 % linen
- Years of printing: 1998

Obverse
- Design: Luba wooden bowl

The 10 Congolese Franc (CDF) bill is a denomination of the official currency of the Democratic Republic of the Congo (DRC). It was introduced as part of the currency reform in 1998, replacing the New Zaire at a rate of 1 Congolese Franc = 100,000 New Zaires. The bill was designed to facilitate small transactions in a country experiencing economic challenges.

== Historical context ==
The introduction of the 10 Congolese Franc bill was part of a broader effort to stabilize the Congolese economy and restore public confidence in the monetary system. The New Zaire had suffered from hyperinflation and a loss of value, prompting the government to introduce a new currency. The 10 Franc bill was intended to cover everyday small purchases.

== Design and features ==
The 10 Congolese Franc bill features traditional Congolese cultural motifs and symbols. The front of the bill showcases a Luba-style pattern, while the back depicts a traditional Congolese woodcut. The bill is printed on a blend of cotton and linen, making it durable for everyday use. Security features include watermarks, a security thread, and raised printing to prevent counterfeiting.

== Economic impact ==
Over the years, the 10 Congolese Franc bill has faced challenges due to inflation and economic instability. The bill's value has significantly depreciated, making it less useful for transactions. Despite efforts by the Bank of Central Congo to combat counterfeiting and stabilize the currency, the 10 Franc bill has become less common in daily use.

== Current status ==
As of recent years, the 10 Congolese Franc bill remains a part of the country's currency system, although its usage has declined due to inflation and the introduction of higher denomination bills. The Bank of Central Congo continues to monitor and address economic challenges to ensure the stability of the Congolese Franc.
