= Bralima =

Beverage company in the Democratic Republic of the Congo

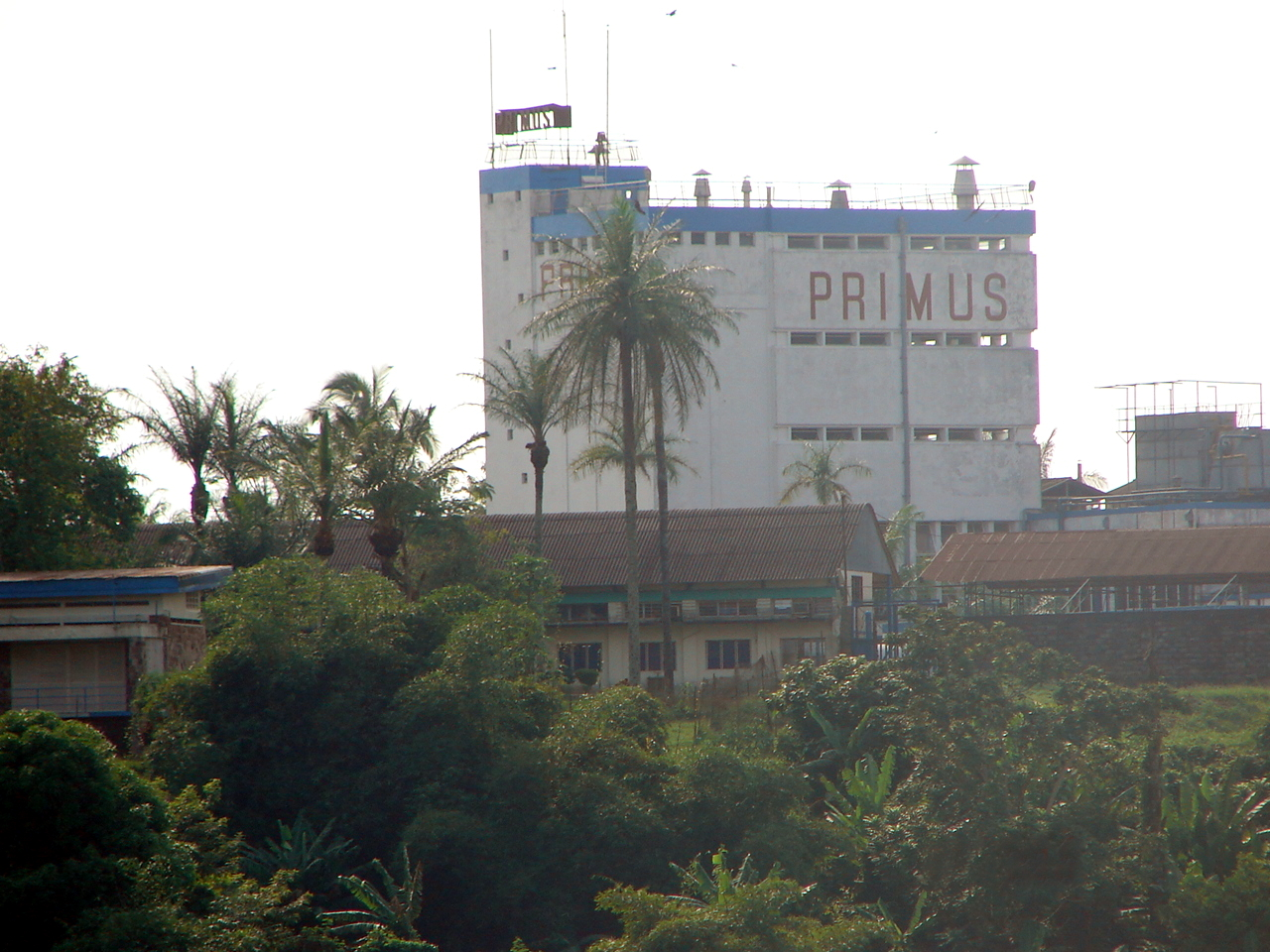
- Bralima brewery in Kisangani
- Type: Public
- Location: Head Office; Avenue du Drapeau; Barumbu, Kinshasa
- Opened: 23 October 1923; 102 years ago
- Annual production volume: Alcoholic beverages; soft drinks; mineral waters
- Revenue: CDF:249.84 billion (2019)
- Operating income: CDF:24.29 billion (2019)
- Net income: ▲Aftertax:CDF:24.29 billion (2019).
- Assets: CDF:102.62 billion (2019)
- Parent: ELNA Holdings Ltd
- Website: https://bralima.net/

Brasseries, Limonaderies et Malteries (contracted as Bralima) is a public limited liability brewing and soft beverage company headquartered on Avenue du Drapeau in Barumbu, Kinshasa, Democratic Republic of the Congo.

Founded on 23 October 1923 as the Brasserie de Léopoldville, it is one of the oldest and most prominent industrial companies in Central Africa. It became part of Heineken N.V. in 1986, which acted as its majority shareholder and strategic parent, before selling its stake on 10 April 2026 to Mauritius-based ELNA Holdings Ltd, which took over operations.

Bralima operates six breweries located in Kinshasa, Bukavu, Kisangani, Boma, Mbandaka, and Lubumbashi, and is known for its flagship Primus lager. On 19 November 2025, Heineken N.V. sold the Bukavu brewery for €1 to a Mauritian-based firm Synergy Ventures Holdings Ltd. As one of the country's largest formal-sector employers, Bralima had a total revenue of CDF 249.84 billion as of 2019, an operating income of CDF 24.29 billion, and total assets valued at CDF 102.62 billion.

Bracongo is Bralima's main competitor in the DRC.

== Organization ==
=== Objectives ===
Bralima's primary focus is the production and commercialization of a variety of beverages, including beer, soft drinks, bottled water, and ice blocks. The company plays an active role in reducing unemployment by creating job opportunities and supports the national economy through its tax contributions.

=== Headquarters and branch structure ===
The Kinshasa headquarters serves as the central hub for overseeing and coordinating its operations across all its branches. It receives strategic directives and goals from ELNA Holdings Ltd and communicates these to the regional branches in Bukavu, Kisangani, Boma, Mbandaka, and Lubumbashi. After receiving the corporate objectives, the headquarters ensures they are shared with all internal departments.

Each branch is structured around the following key departments:

Department/section	Responsibilities and services
Head office management	Responsible for decision-making and strategic management of the branch. Coordinates all departments and services at the head office.
Human resources dept.	Responsible for recruiting and managing staff. It also provides training for employees, monitors their social and working conditions, maintains discipline, and handles public relations for the company.
Commercial dept.	Divided into districts: North Kivu District; South Kivu District; The districts are managed by the department head and are further subdivided into sectors, each managed by a sector head. Their role is to ensure the sales and product promotion.
Finance dept.	Manages company assets and includes an accounting unit that prepares the financial elements to be included in Bralima Congo's balance sheet. It also manages relationships with banks, tax declarations, and other financial reporting. Subdivided into: General accounting; Client accounting; Supplier accounting; Cash accounting and payroll
Technical dept.	Responsible for machine maintenance and repairs. Divided into: Planned maintenance; Machine room; Garage
Medical dept.	Created to provide healthcare for employees and their families. Its mission is solely to provide medical care for BRALIMA employees and their legally recognized dependents.
Quality and technology dept.	Ensures that beer and soft drinks meet international standards to guarantee the health of consumers.
Manufacturing dept.	Transforms raw materials (malt, rice, sugar, chemicals) into finished products. Its primary task is to produce beer and make it available for distribution. Includes two main services: Brewing room (mixing and cooking); Fermentation cellar (fermentation, cooling, and beer filtration)
Bottling dept.	Bottles beverages coming from the fermentation cellar and soft drink production line. Includes: Bottling for beer; Soft drink bottling (limonaderie for BG)

== History ==
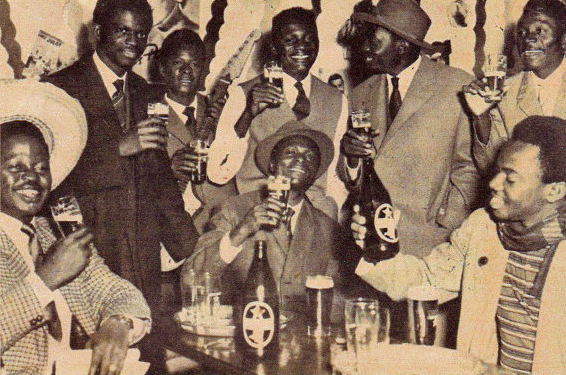
Members of OK-Jazz drinking Primus beer in Brussels, 1961

During the colonial era, traditional alcoholic drinks were the only beverages consumed in the Belgian Congo. Later on, Belgian colonists, seeking to stimulate economic development and investment, decided to set up a local brewing industry. With financial backing from the Société Congolaise de Banque, investors founded a brewery on 23 October 1923, in Léopoldville (present-day Kinshasa) under the name Brasserie de Léopoldville, with an initial capital of 4,000,000 Congolese francs. Shortly thereafter, the company was renamed Brasserie, Limonaderie et Malterie (abbreviated as Bralima). As noted by Congolese writer Pascal Ndegeyi Murhula, Bralima's establishment was intended to counteract the popularity of indigenous alcoholic beverages, which were distilled and fermented "under questionable hygienic conditions".

Three years later, on 26 December 1926, the brewery introduced its first beer, Primus. At the time, it was not pasteurized and production was still small, with around 5,000 bottles made each month. However, between 1926 and 1933, Bralima faced financial hardship due to the Great Depression of 1929, which led to a decline in the international value of its products. During this time, Primus faced competition from imported beers, and many locals found it too expensive. Government rules limited beer sales, and distribution was mostly restricted to urban areas.

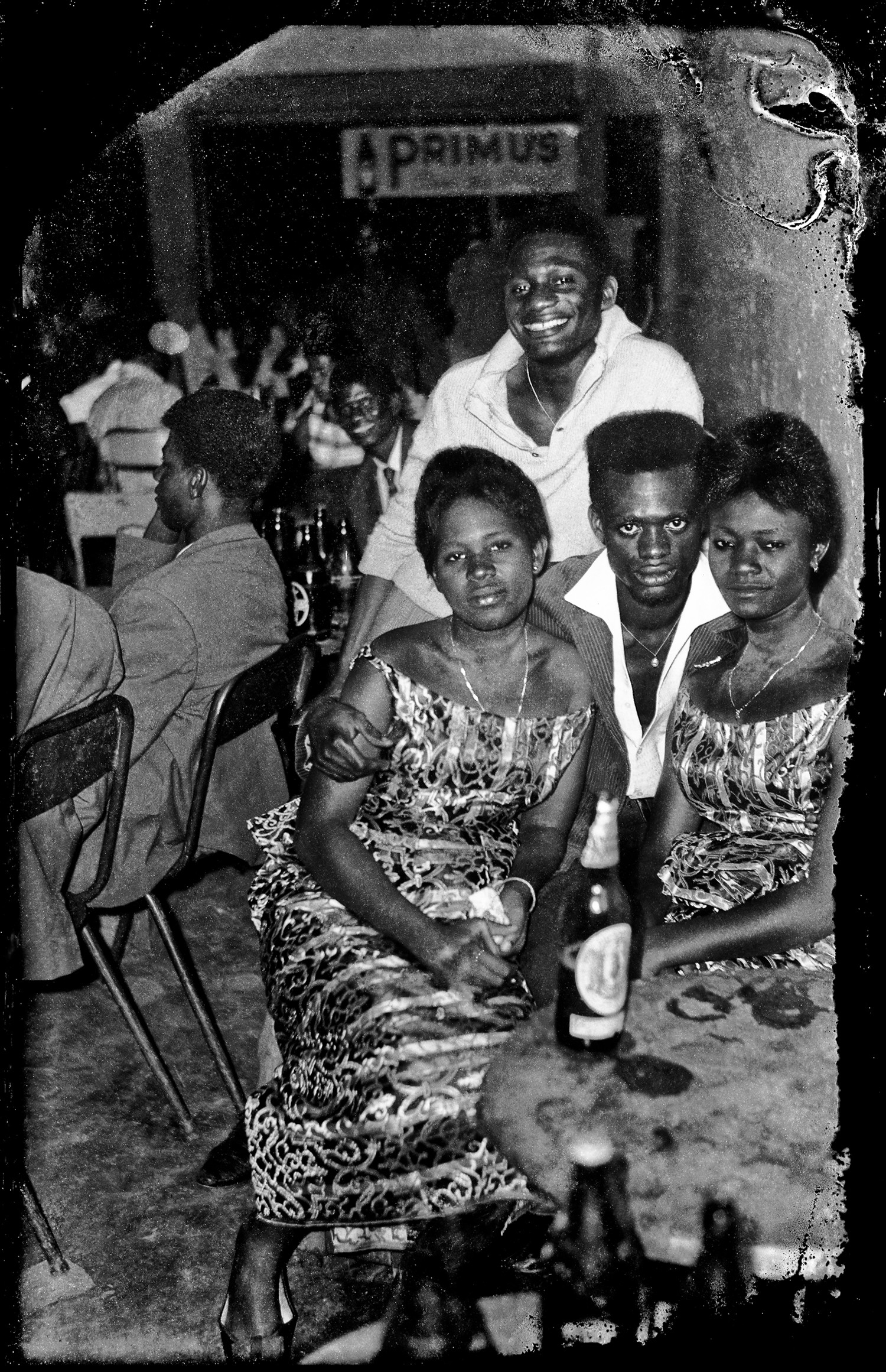
Congolese musicians Kwamy Munsi (standing) and Simaro Lutumba (sitting, center) at a Congolese rumba club in Léopoldville (now Kinshasa), with bottles of Primus beer visible on the tables.

By 1934, production had doubled to 10,000 bottles per month, salaries had increased, and a pasteurizer was installed to extend the shelf life. By 1936, output had climbed to 35,000 bottles per month. Following the Second World War, under "Mr. Viser" leadership, the brewery expanded during an economic boom in the DRC. Stakeholders were more likely to invest, and Bralima decided to implement a decentralized structure. Between 1950 and 1992, the company established several branches: Bukavu (1950), Brazzaville (1952), Kisangani (1957), Kigali (1957), Boma (1958), Mbandaka (1972), Gisenyi (1972), and Lubumbashi (1992). In 1973, Bralima launched a modernization drive that included constructing a Steinecker stainless-steel brewhouse as part of a long-term development program. The 1986 expansion of this facility added twelve fermentation tanks, each with a 250,000-liter capacity, along with a modern filtration system, a sterile water treatment plant, and labeling equipment capable of handling 24,000 bottles per hour.

Since 1986, the company has been majority-owned by Heineken N.V., which has allowed Bralima to maintain its position as a dominant player in the national brewing sector. Heineken N.V. also owns the Kinshasa Bottling Company (Bouteillerie de Kinshasa; BOUKIN), whose plant began operations in 1948 and produced its first bottle on 31 January 1950. The company became part of Heineken N.V.'s portfolio in 1987. In 1992, Heineken N.V. further expanded its presence through the acquisition and merger of the Industrial Soft Drinks Company (Compagnie Industrielle des Boissons; CIB) with Bralima. It also acquired the shares of CIB–Coca-Cola (Compagnie Industrielle des Boissons–Coca-Cola), which produced Coca-Cola beverages under license from the Coca-Cola Company and received financial backing from SODELEAU Bruxelles. This acquisition was officially ratified by Ordinance-Law No. 78/471, dated 26 December of the same year, under which President Mobutu Sese Seko of Zaire consolidated several Congolese beverage producers into a single corporation. The merged entities included the Compagnie Katangaise des Boissons (Katanga Beverage Company) based in Lubumbashi, Boisson de Matadi (Matadi Beverages) in Matadi, Compagnie Industrielle des Boissons (Industrial Beverage Company) in Boma, Compagnie Africaine des Boissons Gazeuses (African Soft Drink Company) in Kisangani, and Compagnie Congolaise des Boissons (Congolese Beverage Company) in Kinshasa.

Heineken N.V. acquired the Unibra plant in Kisangani, which was officially integrated into Bralima-Kisangani on 21 June 1996. Bralima has attracted scrutiny for alleged links with corrupt political figures and rebel leaders involved in the country's prolonged conflict. Due to instability across several regions, Bralima employs Top SIG, a private security firm affiliated with Saracen International, to protect its operations. During the M23 campaign in early 2025, "armed personnel" seized its sites in Bukavu and Goma. Before the conflict reached Goma and Bukavu, the company halted its operations and provided resources to enable employees to remain safely at home, with routine check-ins. On 15 February, after the withdrawal of the Armed Forces of the Democratic Republic of the Congo (FARDC) and the Congolese National Police, widespread looting erupted in Bukavu, which affected multiple organizations, including Bralima, whose depots and brewery suffered extensive damage and theft of stock, materials, and equipment. On 20 February, the Uvira depot was also plundered by military and militia groups, but no employees or their families were harmed, though operations remained suspended in Goma, Bukavu, and the surrounding areas.

On 19 November 2025, Heineken N.V. transferred its Bukavu brewery for €1 to a Mauritian-based firm Synergy Ventures Holdings Ltd, owned by regional entrepreneurs. The transfer followed the loss of operational control in June 2025 and was guided by humanitarian objectives, including safeguarding jobs, maintaining community services, and preventing misuse of the facility. The Bukavu site employed approximately 1,000 people directly and indirectly, and Synergy Ventures took full responsibility for operations, employee welfare, and tax compliance. Heineken N.V. retains a three-year option to repurchase the brewery if conditions improve.

On 10 April 2026, Heineken N.V. sold its stake to Mauritius-based ELNA Holdings Ltd, which took over Bralima's operations, including production, distribution, and employees.

== Brands ==
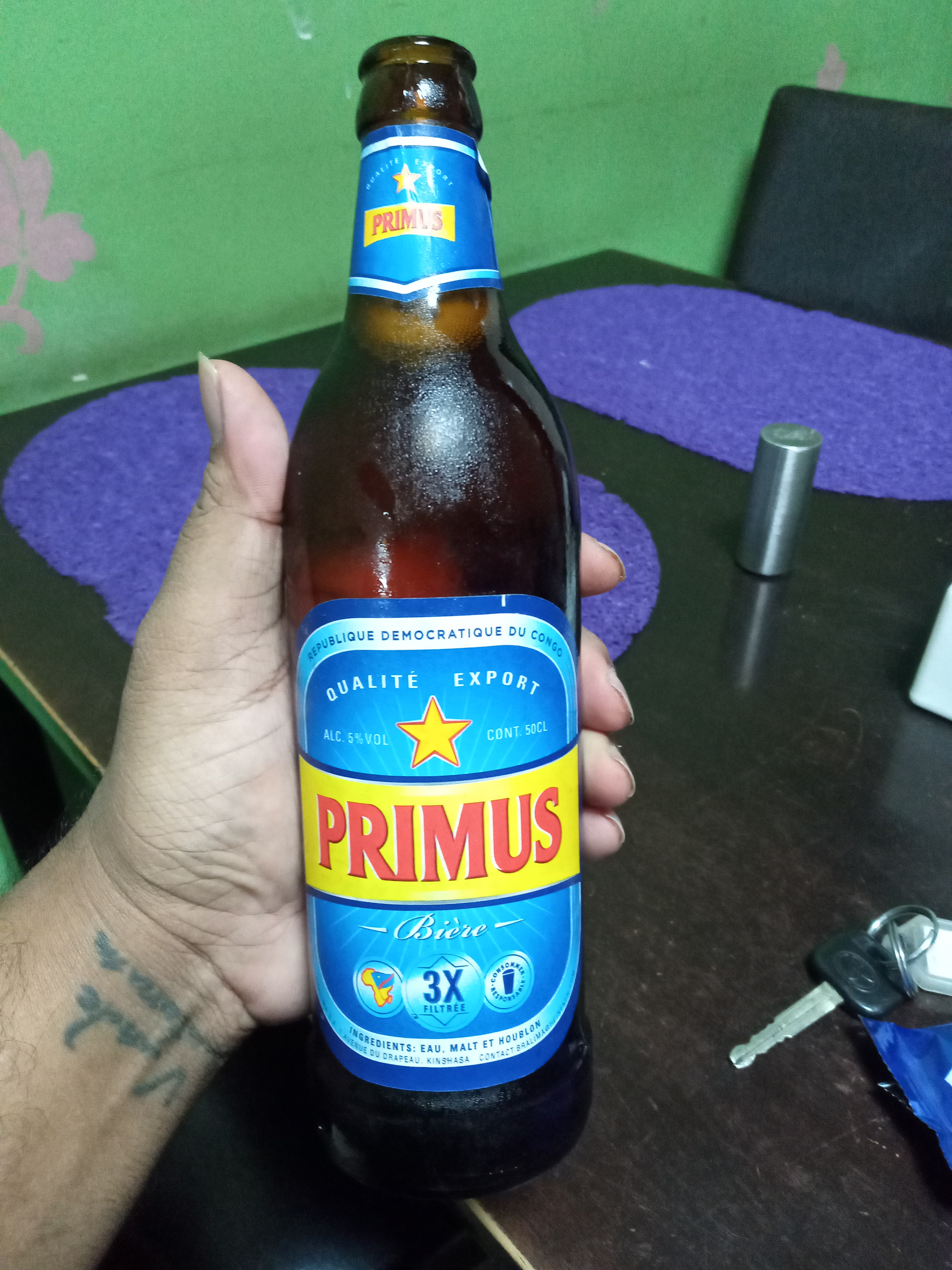
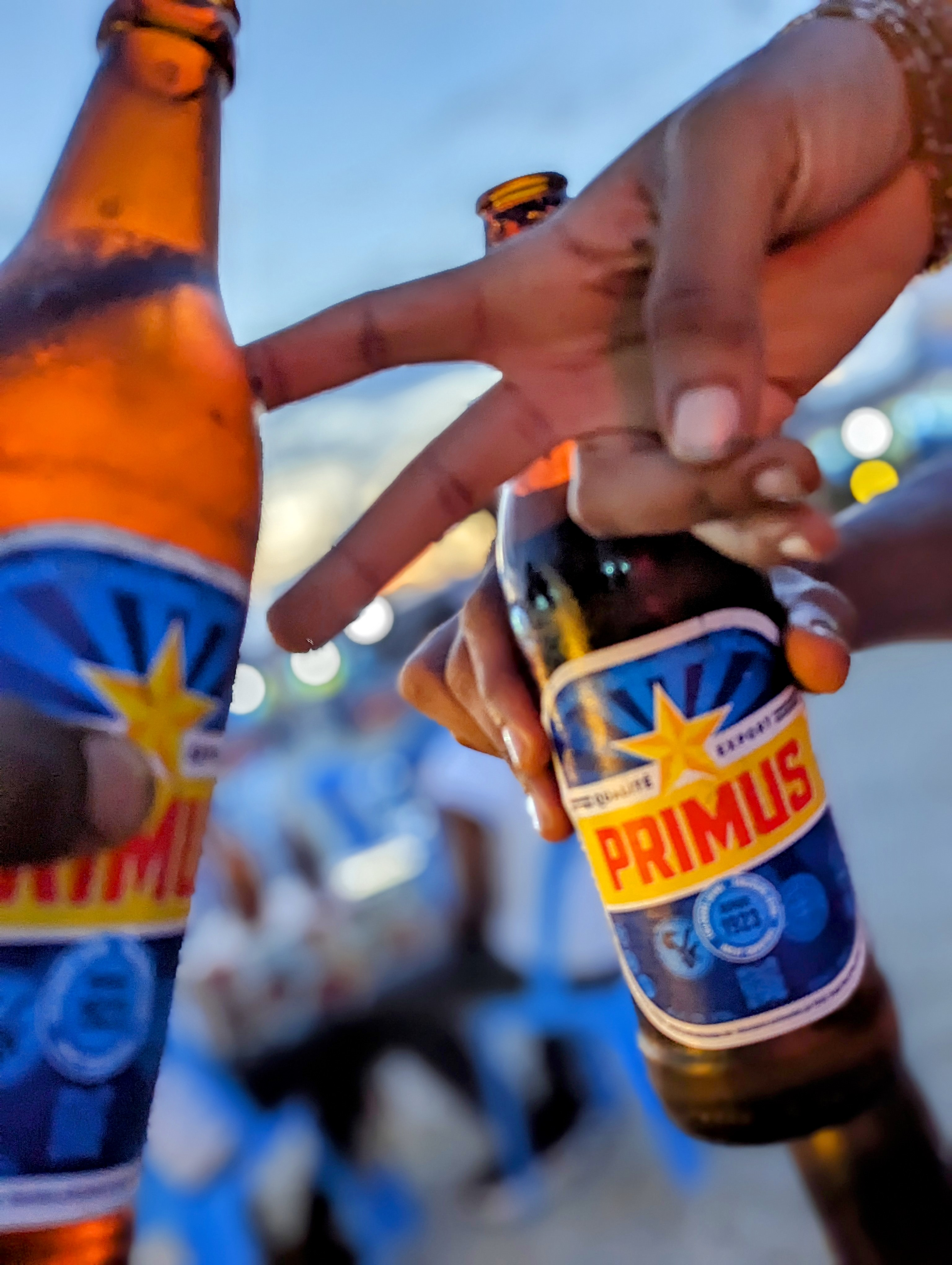
Primus beer is Bralima's main product.

=== Beers ===
- Primus beer:
  - Primus beer is a 5% abv lager that is brewed in Central Africa. It is brewed in Democratic Republic of the Congo, Republic of the Congo, Burundi and Rwanda.
- Mützig
- Turbo King

=== Soft drinks ===
- Orange Fanta
- Sprite
- Lemon Fanta
- Vital'O Grenadine 1/3
- Coca-Cola
- Vital'O Grenadine 2/3

=== Others ===
Others include bottled water (tonic, table water), and ice blocks.

== Financial performance ==
Between 2016 and 2019, the company maintained a stable financial position characterized by a substantial equity base and prudent liquidity practices. Bralima's assets grew steadily, as fixed assets rose from approximately 36.0 billion CDF in 2016 to over 52.6 billion CDF in 2019, while total assets expanded from 78.1 billion CDF to nearly 102.6 billion CDF. Throughout the same period, the working capital (fonds de roulement) remained in surplus, rising from 8.17 billion CDF to 21.46 billion CDF. Operating profitability (rendement d'exploitation) advanced consistently, with returns on employed capital fluctuating between 13% and 29% and averaging around 15% annually. Financial profitability (rentabilité financière), measured through return on investment (ROI), also showed improvement, increasing from 4% in 2016 to 18% in 2019. Commercially, Bralima's total revenue was primarily driven by beverage production volumes, with only a minor decline in 2018 due to reduced merchandise sales.

Year	Operating income	Net income	Total assets
2016	10,677,892,862 CDF	2,816,107,882 CDF	78,051,599,739 CDF
2017	24,222,101,708 CDF	24,222,101,708 CDF	89,606,644,660 CDF
2018	18,038,084,721 CDF	18,038,084,721 CDF	95,472,886,414 CDF
2019	24,292,077,833 CDF	24,292,077,833 CDF	102,617,384,312 CDF
