= Skol =

Trademark

- Type: Beer
- Manufacturer: Carlsberg; Unibra (Africa); Ambev (Brazil)
- Origin: Scotland
- Introduced: 1959; 66 years ago
- Alcohol by volume: 2.8–9%
- Website: www.skolafrica.com

Previous logo

Skol is an international lager brand produced by different companies in different parts of the world. It was first brewed in Scotland.

The name is the English language variant of the Scandinavian drink toast "skål". For a time, the Hägar the Horrible cartoon character was used for promotion.

Carlsberg holds the license to brew and market the beer worldwide, except for Africa and South America. Unibra holds the license for Africa, and Ambev holds it for Brazil. In Europe, the beer is also produced and marketed in Romania and Turkey. In Asia, it is distributed in Malaysia, China, Hong Kong, and Singapore. In Africa, it is present in Angola, Burundi, the Democratic Republic of Congo, Guinea, Madagascar, and Rwanda.

== History ==
Skol is a lager that was brewed originally by Ind Coope, at Alloa, Scotland, as Graham's Golden Lager. In 1958, the name was changed to Graham's Skol to give a Scandinavian impression (the plant had been imported from Sweden). The name was later revised to just Skol.

Allied Breweries (UK), Labatt (Canada), Pripps-Bryggerierna (Sweden), and Unibra (Belgium) formed a new company called Skol International in 1964. Its aim was the creation of a worldwide beer brand, Skol, which could be licensed, manufactured and marketed around the world. In the late 1960s, it was heavily advertised on Dutch pirate Radio Veronica as Skol International, with an advertising jingle sung by Patricia Paay, later a very successful Dutch pop singer and TV presenter. Since then participation in the company has changed significantly.

From 1973 to 1982, beer under the Skol brand was brewed by the Dutch Oranjeboom Brewery, but it was not a success in the Dutch market.

In 1980, Skol was the major sponsor of the Fittipaldi Automotive, after the end of the Copersucar sponsorship at the end of the previous season. The brand also sponsored the Scottish League Cup competition from 1984 to 1992, with a second 'Skol Cup' trophy being awarded to winners alongside the standard league cup during this period.

In 1992, the merger between Allied Breweries and Carlsberg created Carlsberg-Tetley's, who moved the production of Skol from Alloa to their brewery in Leeds until this brewery was closed in 2011. It continues to be distributed in the UK, with an ABV reduced to 2.8%.

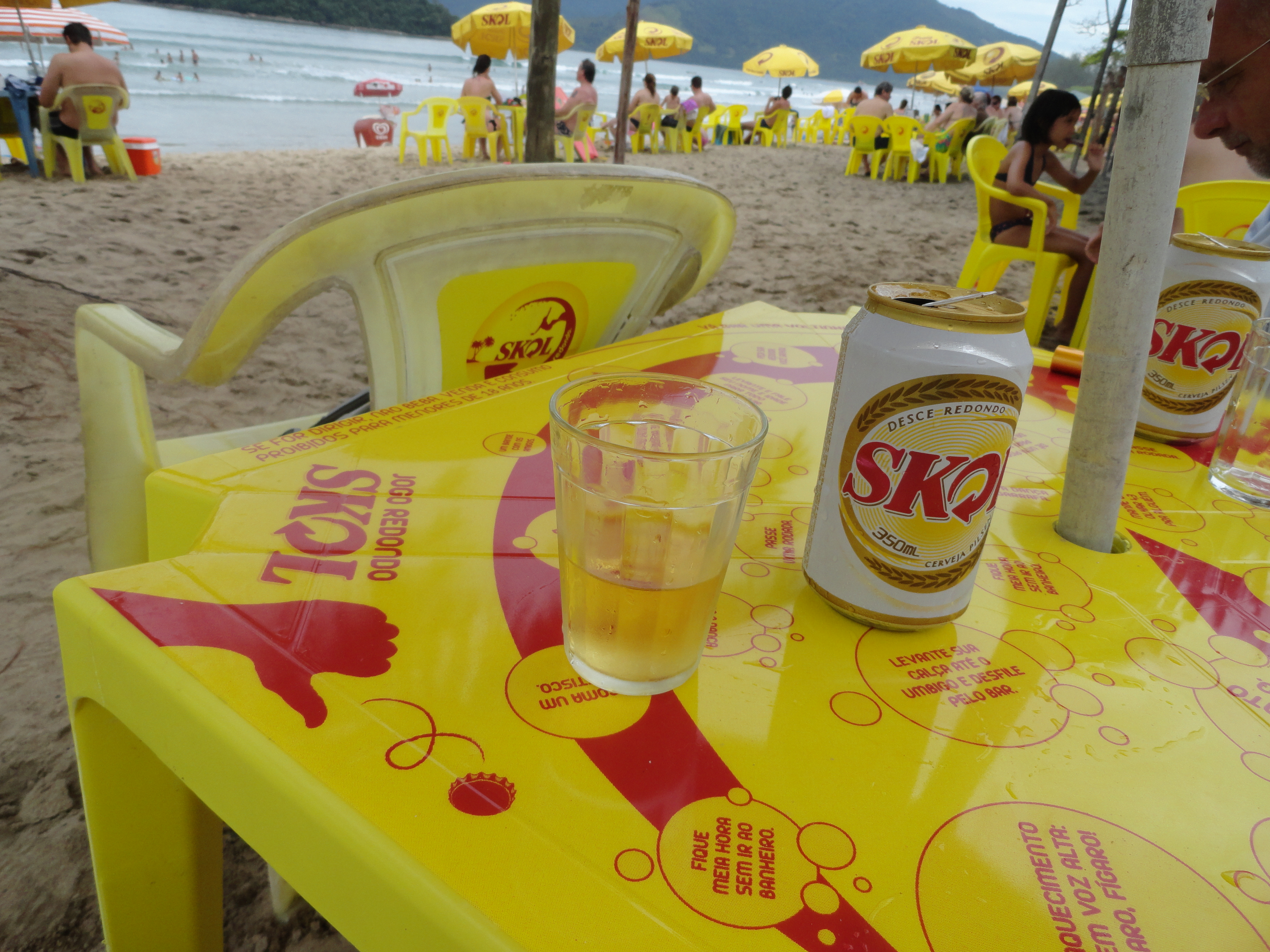
Skol cans and tables at the beach in Brazil

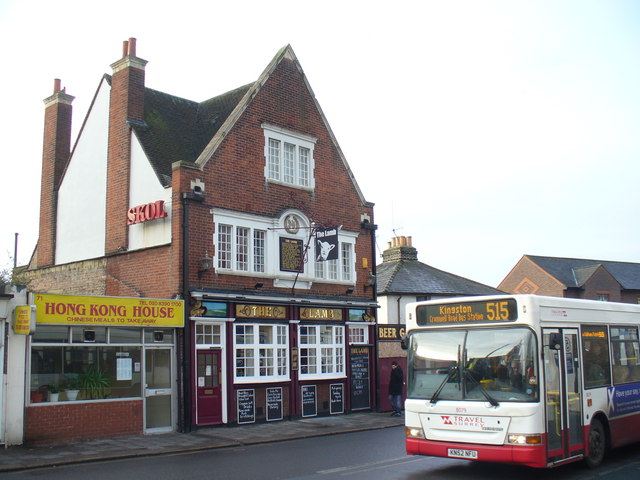
A pub in Surbiton, London advertising Skol

In the Brazilian market Skol has added a new drink to their brand named "Skol Beats" which has a citrus taste and several flavors, including blue, red, and green, in addition to a newer line of Skol Beats gin and tonic beverages all containing approximately 7.9% alcohol.

== Awards ==
The brand was awarded a Gold Award at the 2012 World Quality Selections, organized by Monde Selection. This was the second international award that Skol won. The beer was also awarded a gold medal for packaging and a silver medal in the taste category at the 2005 Australian International Beer Awards.
