= Boissons du Cameroun =

Brewing company in Cameroon

- Location: Douala; Cameroon
- Opened: 1948
- Annual production volume: 4.97 million hectolitres (4,240,000 US bbl)
- Owner: BGI Castel (75%), Heineken (8.8%)
- Website: www.boissonsducameroun.com

Active beers
| Name | Type |
| "33" Export | lager |
| Amstel | lager |
| Beaufort | lager |
| Castel | lager |
| Heineken | pilsener |
| Mützig | lager |
| Tuborg | lager |

Les Sociétés Anonymes des Brasseries du Cameroun (SABC or Groupe SABC) is a brewing company in Cameroon. Their offices and main factory are in Douala, with other breweries in Bafoussam, Douala, Garoua, and Yaoundé. Les Brasseries et Glacieres Internationales (BGI) owns a 75% share in the company, and Heineken owns 8.8%.

== Beer ==
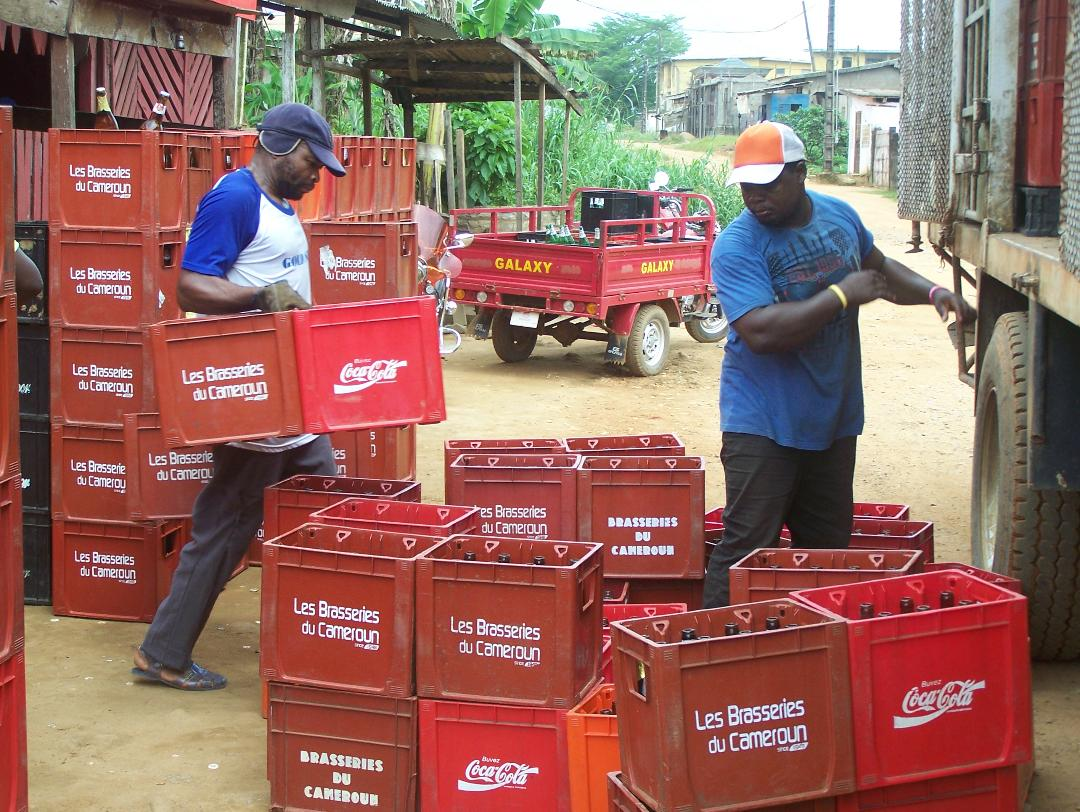
Loading products

Les Brasseries brews, bottles, and distributes several brands of beer: "33" Export, Beaufort, Castel, and Tuborg, as well as three beers from De Hooiberg (The Haystack): Amstel, Heineken (since 2005), and Mützig. Les Brasseries bottles and distributes Coca-Cola products in Cameroon, and local soft drink trademarks include Top and Djino. Today, les Brasseries du Cameroun holds a 75% share of the Cameroonian market for beer and soft drinks. Sales for 2000 were 170 billion FCFA (250 million US$) and profits were 8.5 billion FCFA (11 million US$). Sales came primarily from within Cameroon (95%), with the other 5% from exports to Chad, Equatorial Guinea, and Gabon. The company began construction of a factory in Equatorial Guinea on 14 November 2000. This was scheduled to open in 2001. In its annual report for 2012 (published on 27 June 2013), Les Brasseries produced 4.97 million hectoliters of beer, an improvement of 4.5% over 2011. Its market share of beer production in Cameroon stands at 82.2%.

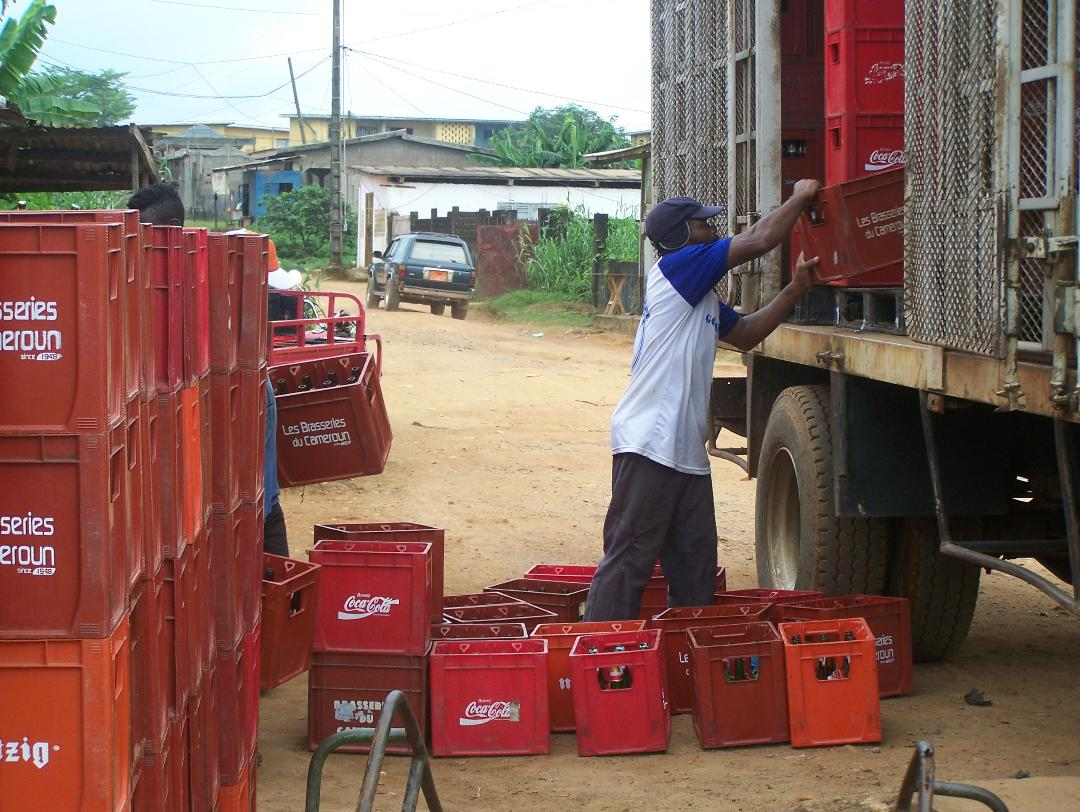
Chargeurs casiers2

== Football ==
Les Brasseries owns several Cameroonian football teams and is a major sponsor of the Cameroonian national football team. Since 1994, SABC has run a football school in Douala called l'École de Football des Brasseries du Cameroun (EFBC). Many of Cameroon's star players have come through this facility. In September 2008, Les Brasseries Du Cameroun announced its acquisition of the majority shares in SIAC Isenbeck, which is a subsidiary of the Germany-based group Warsteiner. This is in a major move by Warsteiner to re-orient the management of its interests in Africa through decentralisation and partnership. SIAC Isenbeck which started activities in Cameroon about a decade ago suffered a significant setback a few years later. This led to the company's inactivity for a while after which it resurfaced.

== Company history ==
Les Brasseries was founded in 1948 as a subsidiary of the French company les Brasseries et Glaceries d'Indochine (BGI). The company's first factory was in Douala, and others opened in Yaoundé, then Garoua, Bafoussam, and finally Limbe. Healthy profits and growth allowed the company to set up its own subsidiaries, including Tangui mineral water and a glass bottle plant. Les Brasseries was the only provider of such bottles within Cameroon, so even its competitors relied on it for these.

Les Brasseries enjoyed a monopoly on the Cameroonian market until 1982 when Nouvelles brasseries africaines (NOBRA) began production. In 1987, les Brasseries intensified its activities. However, la Crise, a nationwide recession, hit that same year, and les Brasseries du Cameroun struggled to remain profitable for the better part of the next decade. The company's multiple factories gave it a decisive edge over its competition by greatly easing distribution across the country. Even when SBAC was forced to close its Limbe brewery, it still had three plants. As Cameroon's economy recovered somewhat in 1995, les Brasseries recovered as well. This was partially due to increased utilisation of locally available materials such as maize instead of imported barley. By 1997, the company's financial situation was comparable to what it had been a decade earlier, although the number of bottles brewed was only about half of what it had been in 1987.

Les Brasseries du Cameroun's parent company, BGI, was purchased by the Castel Group, a company better known for its wines, in 1990. By the end of the decade, les Brasseries had captured 70% of Cameroon's alcoholic beverage market and 80% of the soft drink market. In 1994, SABC figures indicated that the brewery had produced 207,500,000 L of beer and 56,000,000 L of soft drinks.
