= Congolese franc =

National currency of the Democratic Republic of the Congo

franc congolais (French)

ISO 4217
- Code: CDF (numeric: 976)
- Subunit: 0.01

Unit
- Symbol: FC

Denominations
- Subunit
- 1/100: centime
- Banknotes: 1, 5, 10, 20, 50 centimes, 1, 5, 10, 20, 50, 100, 200, 500, 1,000, 5,000, 10,000, 20,000 francs

Demographics
- Date of introduction: 1 July 1998; 27 years ago
- Replaced: New zaire
- User(s): Democratic Republic of the Congo; Formerly: (Democratic Republic of the Congo) First Congolese Republic; South Kasai (Belgium) Ruanda-Urundi; Belgian Congo; Congo Free State

Issuance
- Central bank: Central Bank of the Congo
- Website: www.bcc.cd

Valuation
- Inflation: 9.27%
- Source: , 2022

The Congolese franc (French: franc congolais, code FC; Dutch: Congolese frank) is the currency of the Democratic Republic of the Congo. In the past, it was subdivided into 100 centimes. However, centimes no longer have a practical value and are no longer used. In April 2024, 2,800 francs was equivalent to one United States dollar (US$1).

== First franc (1887–1967) ==
Currency denominated in centimes and francs (called frank in Dutch) was first introduced in 1887 for use in the Congo Free State (1885–1908). After the Free State's annexation by Belgium, the currency continued in the Belgian Congo. The francs were equal in value to the Belgian franc. From 1916, the Congolese franc also circulated in Ruanda-Urundi (present day Rwanda and Burundi) and, from 1952, the currency was issued jointly in the names of the Belgian Congo and Ruanda-Urundi. After the independence of the Democratic Republic of the Congo in 1960, Ruanda-Urundi adopted its own franc, whilst, between 1960 and 1963, Katanga also issued a franc of its own.

A currency based on the gold standard was created for the Congo Free State in 1887. Banknotes were issued from 1896 in the name of the General Treasury of the Congo Free State (Trésoire générale de l'État indépendant du Congo) payable to the bearer, until the annexation of the Free State in 1908.

As a result of the confused legal definition under Article 11 of the 1908 Colonial Charter, it has been argued that the Congolese franc did not exist de jure as a currency between 1908 and 1960 and was instead merely a token representing a claim on Belgian francs. It did exist, however, as the sole de facto currency in the Belgian Congo and Ruanda-Urundi.

A decree in 1911 authorised the private Bank of the Belgian Congo (Banque du Congo Belge, BCB) to issue banknotes for the Belgian Congo payable to the bearer. They could be converted into the gold or silver currency of the Latin Union or into foreign currencies at the prevailing gold exchange rate. Convertibility was suspended during World War I and was only restored in 1927. Although the Congolese franc had appreciated during the conflict, it was restored to parity with the Belgian franc in 1919. Parity was again broken during World War II. After the conflict, the Congolese and Belgian francs continued to form part of the "Belgian monetary zone" under the Bretton Woods system. A central bank was created in 1951 entitled the Central Bank of the Belgian Congo and Ruanda-Urundi (Banque Centrale du Congo Belge et du Ruanda-Urundi, BCCBRU) which subsequently issued both coins and banknotes and dealt with foreign exchange controls and was partially supported by the National Bank of Belgium.

The franc remained Congo's currency after independence in 1960. Afterwards, its value relative to the Belgian franc fell. In 1967, when the zaire was introduced, at a rate of 1 zaïre = 1,000 francs.

=== Coins ===
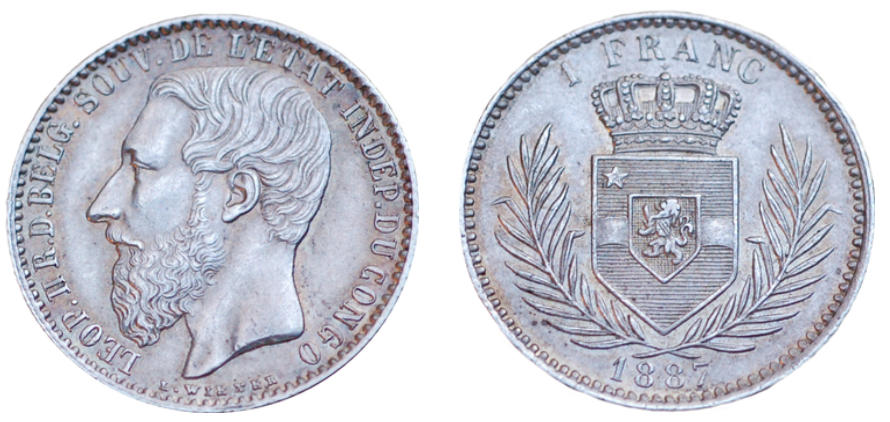
Obverse and Reverse of an 1887 Franc minted for the Congo Free State, with the unabridged and translated obverse lettering of "Leopold II, King of the Belgians, Sovereign of the Independent State of the Congo".

In 1887, holed, copper coins were introduced in denominations of 1, 2, 5 and 10 centimes, together with silver coins worth 50 centimes, and 1, 2, and 5 francs. Coins ceased to be minted in silver in 1896. Holed, cupro-nickel 5, 10 and 20 centime coins were introduced in 1906, with the remaining copper coins (worth 1 and 2 centimes) minted until 1919. Cupro-nickel 50 centime and 1 franc coins were introduced in 1921 and 1920, respectively.

The coinage of Belgian Congo ceased in 1929, only to be resumed in 1936 and 1937 for the issue of nickel-bronze 5 franc coins. In 1943, hexagonal, brass 2 franc coins were introduced, followed by round, brass coins worth 1, 2 and 5 francs, and silver 50 franc coins, between 1944 and 1947.

In 1952, brass 5-franc coins were issued carrying the name "Ruanda-Urundi" for the first time.

Aluminum coins worth 50 centimes, 1 and 5 francs followed between 1954 and 1957. In 1965, the only franc-denominated coins of the first Democratic Republic of Congo were issued, aluminum coins worth 10 francs.

As with Belgium's own coins, some types were issued in two distinct versions, one with French legends, the other with Dutch legends.

=== Banknotes ===
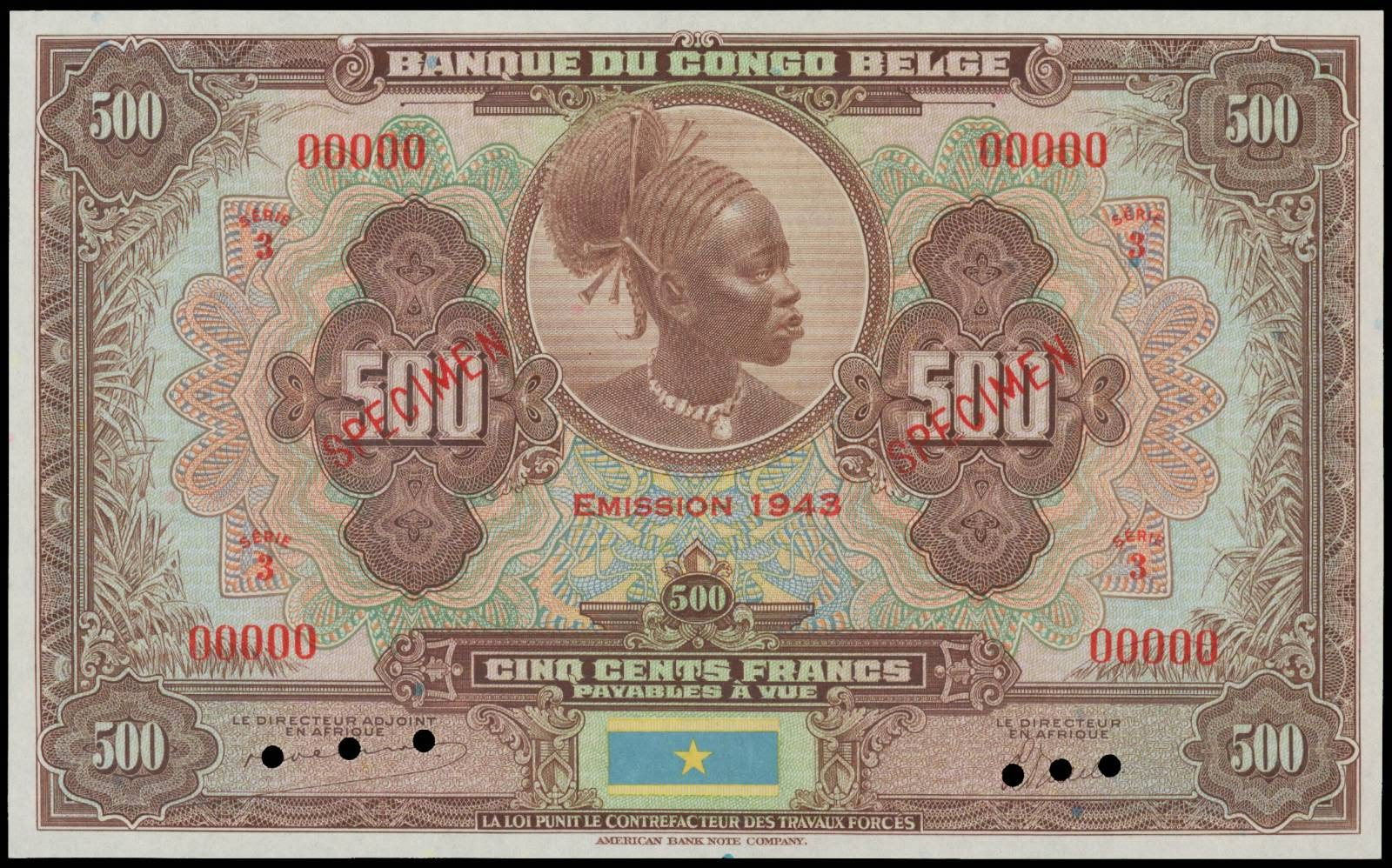
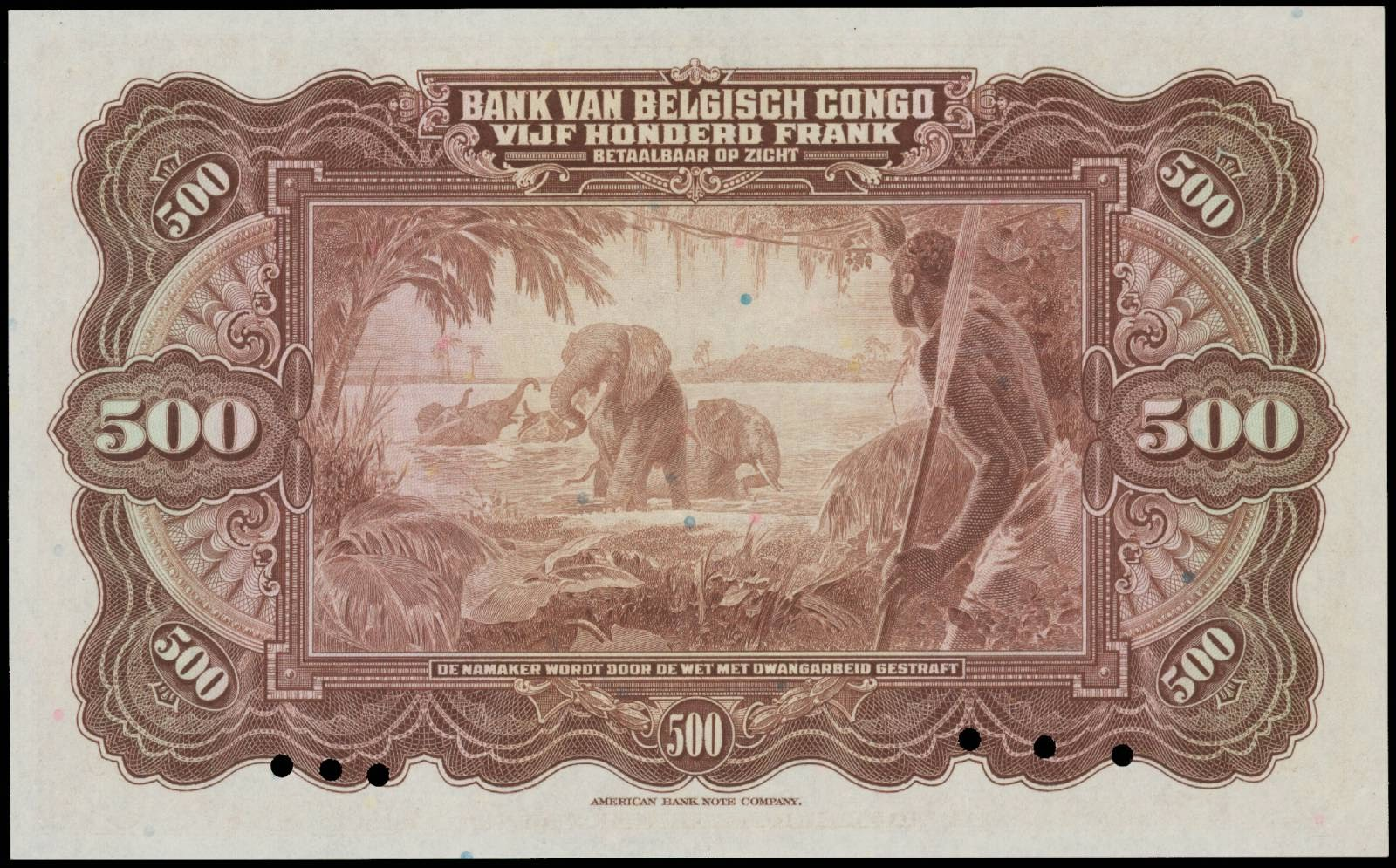
500 francs, issued by the Bank of the Belgian Congo, 1943 (obverse and reverse)

In 1896 the Congo Free State issued 10 and 100 franc notes. In 1912, the Bank of Belgian Congo introduced 20 and 1000 francs, followed by notes of 1, 5 and 100 franc notes in 1914. The 1-franc notes were only printed until 1920, whilst 10 franc notes were introduced in 1937. 500 francs were introduced in the 1940s, with 10,000 francs introduced in 1942.

In 1952, the Central Bank of Belgian Congo and Ruanda-Urundi introduced notes for 5, 10, 20, 50 and 100 francs, with 500 and 1000 francs added in 1953.

In 1961, the National Bank of Congo introduced notes for 20, 50, 100, 500 and 1000 francs, some of which were issued until 1964. In 1962, the Monetary Council of the Republic of Congo introduced 1000 franc notes, which were notes of the Central Bank of Belgian Congo and Ruanda-Urundi overprinted with the Monetary Council's name. In 1963, the Monetary Council issued regular type 100 and 5000 franc notes.

== Second franc (1997–present) ==
The franc was re-established in 1997, replacing the new zaïre at a rate of 1 franc = 100,000 new zaïres, equivalent to 300 trillion old francs.

Coins were not issued; denominations below one franc were issued in banknote form only. Coins were struck, but the value of the metal in each coin exceeded the value of the coin.

=== Banknotes ===
On 30 June 1998, banknotes were introduced in denominations of 1, 5, 10, 20 and 50 centimes, 1, 5, 10, 20, 50 and 100 francs, though all are dated 01.11.1997. 200-franc notes were introduced in 2000, followed by 500-franc notes in 2002. In February 2025, the only negotiable instrument in circulation in the Democratic Republic of the Congo was banknotes of 50, 100, 200, 500, 1,000, 5,000, 10,000 and 20,000 francs.

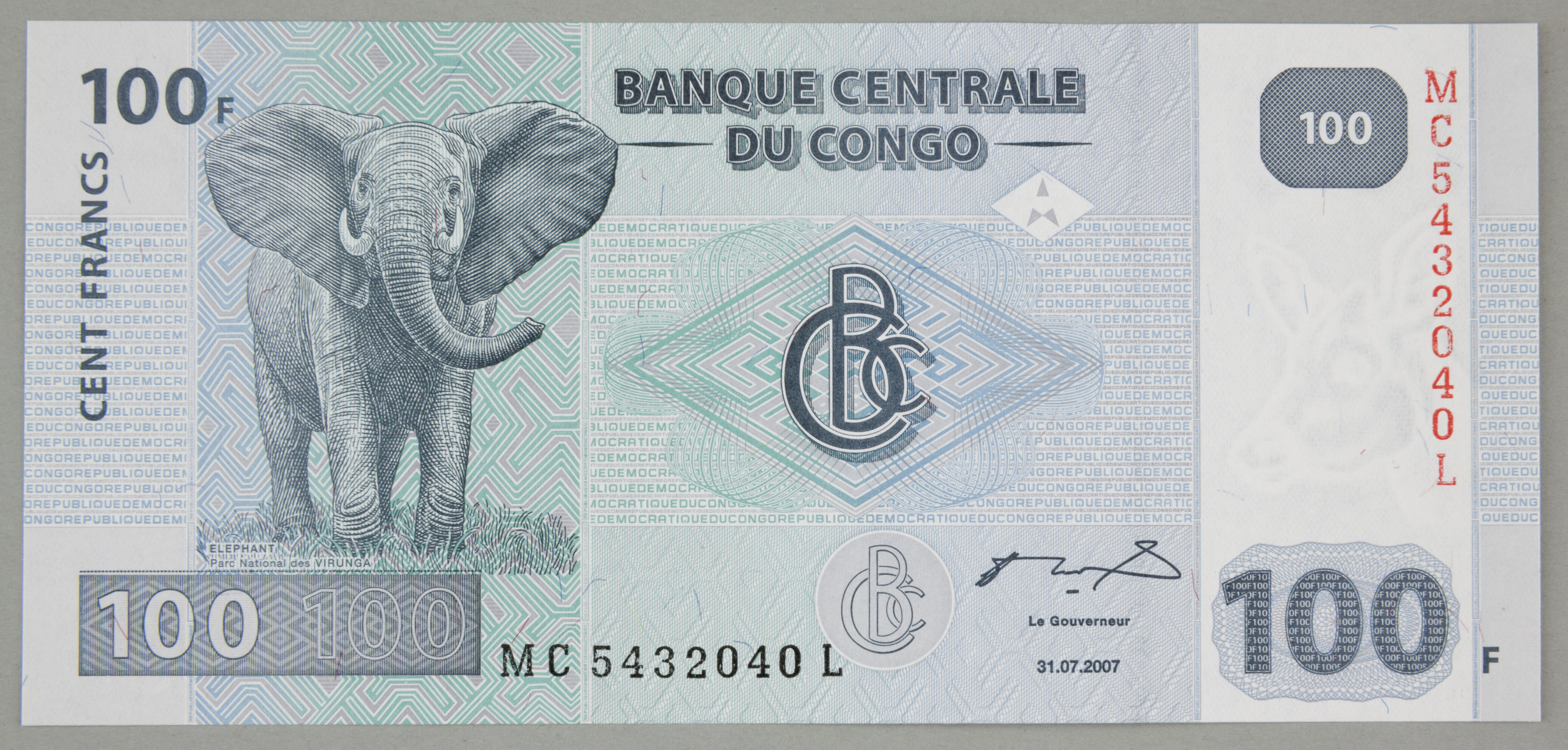
100 Congolese franc banknote (2007)

In 2010, the Central Bank of the Congo issued 20 million 500 franc banknotes to commemorate the country's 50th anniversary of independence from Belgium.

On July 2, 2012, the Central Bank of the Congo issued new banknotes in denominations of 1,000, 5,000, 10,000 and 20,000 francs.

The smallest note in use is 50 francs.

Banknotes of the Congolese franc (01.11.1997 issue)
Image	Value	Main color	Obverse	Reverse	Watermark
	1 centime	Deep olive-green, violet and dark brown	Coffee harvest	Nyiragongo volcano	Single Okapi head or multiple Okapi heads repeated vertically
	5 centimes	Purple	Suku mask	Zande harp	Single Okapi head or multiple Okapi heads repeated vertically
	10 centimes	Red-violet and dark-brown	Pende mask	Pende dancers	Single Okapi head or multiple Okapi heads repeated vertically
	20 centimes	Blue-green and black	Antelope	Upemba National Park	Single Okapi head or multiple Okapi heads repeated vertically
	50 centimes	Dark brown and brown	Okapi	Okapis at Epulu Okapi Reserve	Single Okapi head or multiple Okapi heads repeated vertically
	1 franc	Deep purple and blue-violet	Gécamines' copper smelting complex	Patrice Lumumba with his comrades after his capture	Single Okapi head or multiple Okapi heads repeated vertically
	5 francs	Purple and black	Rhinoceros, Garamba National Park	Kamwanga falls	Single Okapi head or multiple Okapi heads repeated vertically
	10 francs	Red-violet	Luba carving "Tête-à-Tête"	Luba carving	Single Okapi head or multiple Okapi heads repeated vertically
	20 francs	Brown-orange and red-orange	Lion, Kundelongu Park	Lioness with her cubs, Kundelongu Park	Single Okapi head or multiple Okapi heads repeated vertically
	50 francs	Blue-Purple	Tshokwe mask "Mwana Pwo"	Fishermen's village along the Congo River	Single Okapi head or multiple Okapi heads repeated vertically
	100 francs	Red	Elephant, Virunga National Park	"Inga II" hydroelectric dam	Single Okapi head or multiple Okapi heads repeated vertically

Banknotes of the Congolese franc (04.01.2000 issue)
Image	Value	Main color	Obverse	Reverse	Watermark
	50 francs	Lilac-brown	Tshokwe mask "Mwana Pwo"	Fishermen's village along the Congo River	Single Okapi head or multiple Okapi heads repeated vertically
	100 francs	Slate blue	Elephant, Virunga National Park	"Inga II" hydroelectric dam	Single Okapi head or multiple Okapi heads repeated vertically

Banknotes of the Congolese franc (30.06.2000 & 04.01.2002 (2003) issues)
Image	Value	Main color	Obverse	Reverse	Watermark
	200 francs	Lilac and olive-green	Fieldwork	Drummers	Single Okapi head or multiple Okapi heads repeated vertically
	500 francs	Blue	Diamond exploitation	Diamond exploitation, Etroite Valley	Single Okapi head or multiple Okapi heads repeated vertically

Banknotes of the Congolese franc (02.02.2005 & 18.02.2006 (2012) issues)
Image	Value	Main color	Obverse	Reverse	Watermark
	1000 francs	Green	Okapi, Kanioka box	Grey parrot; yellow corn	Okapi and electrotype 1000
	5000 francs	Orange	Zebras; Hemba statuette	Bowl; bundles of maniok; two helmeted guineafowl	Okapi and electrotype 5000
	10,000 francs	Violet	Two wildebeest; carved statuette	Bird on a branch; banana trees	Okapi and electrotype 10,000
	20,000 francs	Yellow	Giraffes; carved head "Bashilele"	Palm trees; date clusters; two grey crowned cranes (Balearica regulorum)	Leopard head and electrotype 20,000

Current CDF exchange rates
From Google Finance:	AUD CAD CHF CNY EUR GBP HKD JPY USD XAF ZAR
From Yahoo! Finance:	AUD CAD CHF CNY EUR GBP HKD JPY USD XAF ZAR
From XE.com:	AUD CAD CHF CNY EUR GBP HKD JPY USD XAF ZAR
From OANDA:	AUD CAD CHF CNY EUR GBP HKD JPY USD XAF ZAR

== See also ==
- Economy of the Democratic Republic of the Congo
- CFA franc
- Comorian franc
- Djiboutian franc
- Swiss franc

== Bibliography ==
- Boehme, O. (2007). "Monetary Affairs in the Heart of Africa. The National Bank of Belgium and Finance in Congo, 1945-1974". Journal of European Economic History (1): 13–45.
- Krause, Chester L.; Clifford Mishler (1991). Standard Catalog of World Coins: 1801–1991 (18th ed.). Krause Publications. ISBN 0873411501.
- Pick, Albert (1994). Bruce, Colin R. II; Shafer, Neil (eds.). Standard Catalog of World Paper Money: General Issues (7th ed.). Krause Publications. ISBN 0-87341-207-9.
