= Unibra =

Unibra is a Belgium based company operating in the African drinks market.

It was created by Michel Relecom in 1960 through the merger of four breweries in what is now the Democratic Republic of the Congo, and was established under Belgian law in 1961. In 1987, it gained control of the Sobragui brewery (Société des brasseries de Guinée) in Conakry, Guinea, now its main operation especially after it sold its Congo breweries in 1996.

It was one of the founders of the Skol beer brand in 1964, and it still holds the marketing rights for Africa. It operates in six countries: Skol is the most popular beer brand in Guinea.

The Unibra group also undertakes private equity and real estate investment.

In 2012 Unibra and the Mauritius-based Phoenix Beverages entered in cooperation with Nouvelle Brasserie de Madagascar SA Madagascar's beer market.
