= Music of Rwanda =

The music of Rwanda encompasses Rwandan traditions of folk music as well as contemporary East African Afrobeat and Congolese Ndombolo, and performers of a wide variety of Western genres including hip-hop, R&B, gospel music and pop ballads.

== Traditional music ==
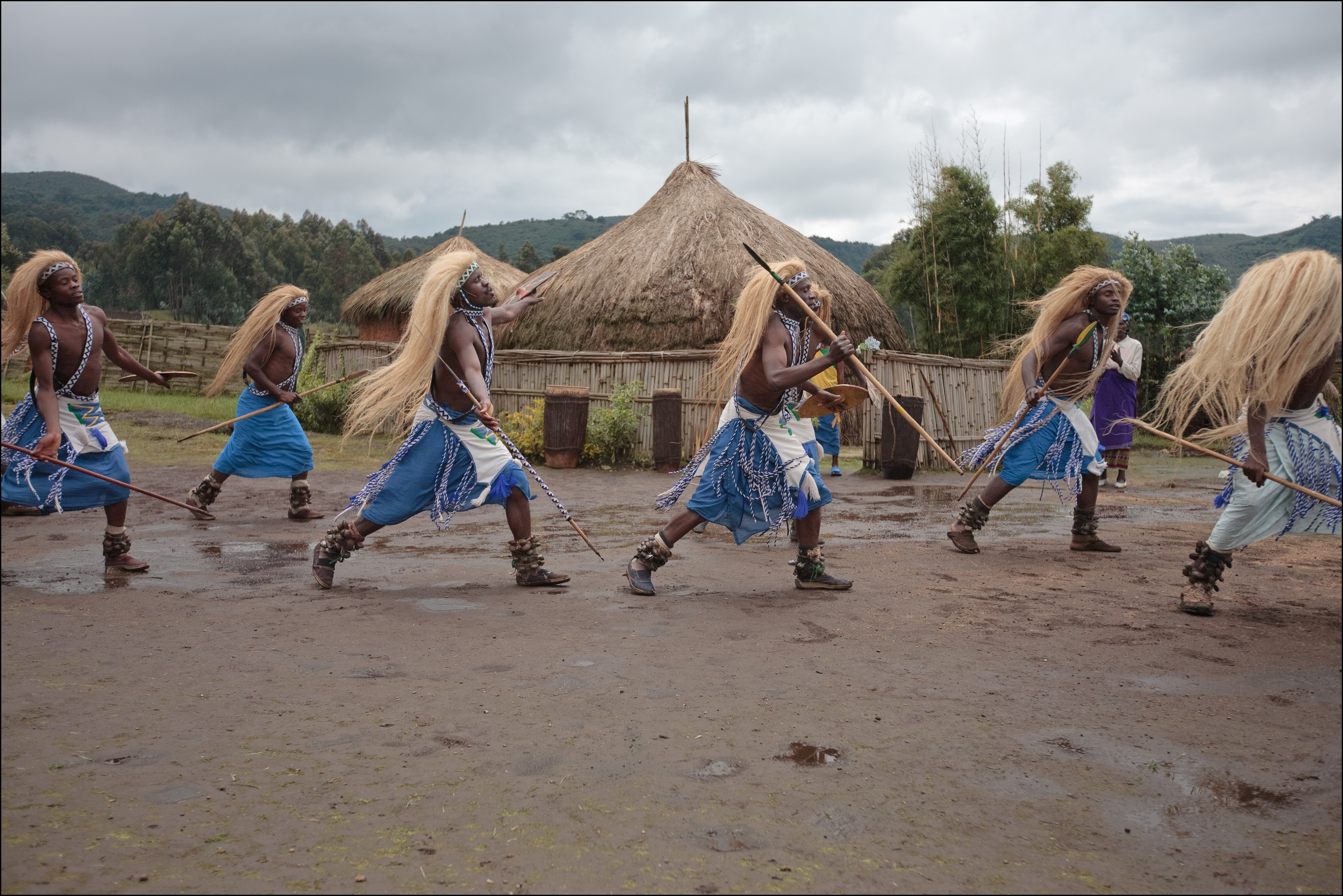
Twa dancers

Traditional music and dance are taught in "amatorero" dance groups, which are found across the country. The most famous of these is the Ballet National Urukerereza, which was created in the early 1970s to represent Rwanda in international events. Also famous were the Amasimbi n'amakombe and Irindiro dance troupes.

The ikinimba is perhaps the most revered musical tradition in Rwanda. It is a dance that tells the stories of Rwandan heroes and kings, accompanied by instruments like ngoma, ikembe, iningiri, umuduri and inanga. The inanga, a lyre-like string instrument, has been played many of Rwanda's best-known performers, including Rujindiri, Sebatunzi, Rwishyura, Simparingoma, Sentoré, Kirusu, Sophie and Viateur Kabarira, and Simon Bikindi.

Jean-Paul Samputu, along with his group Ingeli, won two Kora awards (African Grammy awards) for "Most Inspiring Artist" and "Best Traditional Artist" in 2003 for their performance of neo-traditional Rwandan music. The group tours the world spreading the Christian message of peace and reconciliation, and helps raise money for the many orphans of Rwanda. In 2007 Samputu brought twelve of these orphans, known as Mizero Children of Rwanda, to tour the U.S. and Canada. Cyprien Kagorora was nominated for a 2005 Kora Award in the category of "Best Traditional Artist". He is among the most recognizable male vocalists in Rwanda.

Notably, the musical tradition of pre-colonial Rwanda also included ballads and epic poems(ibitekerezo), which recounted history, genealogy and moral lessons, as well as praise songs dedicated to kings (abami) and heroes.

== Contemporary artists ==
In the post-colonial period, Rwanda produced popular local bands like Imena, Nyampinga, Les 8 Anges, Les Fellows, Impala, Abamarungu, Los Compagnons de la Chanson, Bisa, Ingenzi, and Isibo y'Ishakwe. They took influences from across Africa, especially the Congo, as well as Caribbean Zouk and Reggae.

Socio-military unrest and violence led many Rwandans to move overseas in the late 20th century, bringing their country's music to cities like Brussels and Paris. For many years, Rwandan-Belgian Cécile Kayirebwa was arguably the most internationally famous Rwandan musician. She is still played regularly on Rwandan radio stations. The late 1990s saw the arrival of Rwandan-Canadian Corneille and Jean-Paul Samputu.

The Rwandan genocide temporarily disrupted music production within Rwanda. In recent years music has gradually returned to the country, led by Rwandan youth. A crop of new stars has emerged, including such names as Kamichi, Aimé Murefu, Mani Martin, Tom Close, Urban Boyz, Miss Jojo, King James, Knowless, Dream Boys, Kitoko, Riderman, and Miss Shanel.

== Local music industry ==
The music industry in Rwanda is gradually growing and becoming more professionalized. An increasing number of companies are investing in the development of new talent, including the production of major music festivals like Kigali Up! and Primus Guma Guma Super Star, and the music competition television show .artists like Meddy, are now taking Rwandan music to the next level.

== Bibliography ==
- Jacquemin, Jean-Pierre, Jadot Sezirahigha and Richard Trillo. "Echoes from the Hills". 2000. In Broughton, Simon and Ellingham, Mark with McConnachie, James and Duane, Orla (Ed.), World Music, Vol. 1: Africa, Europe and the Middle East, pp 608–612. Rough Guides Ltd, Penguin Books. ISBN 1-85828-636-0
