= Culture of Rwanda =

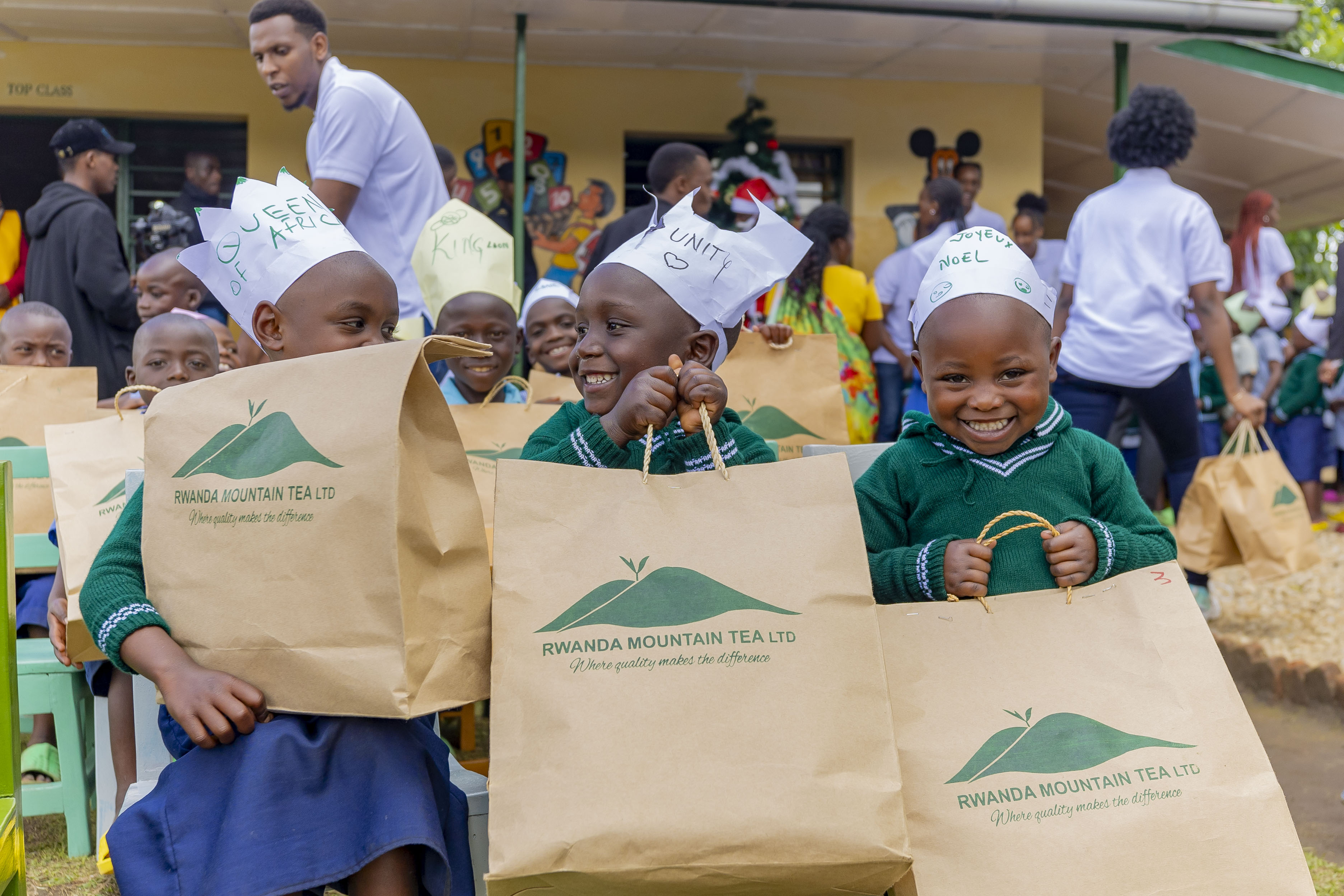
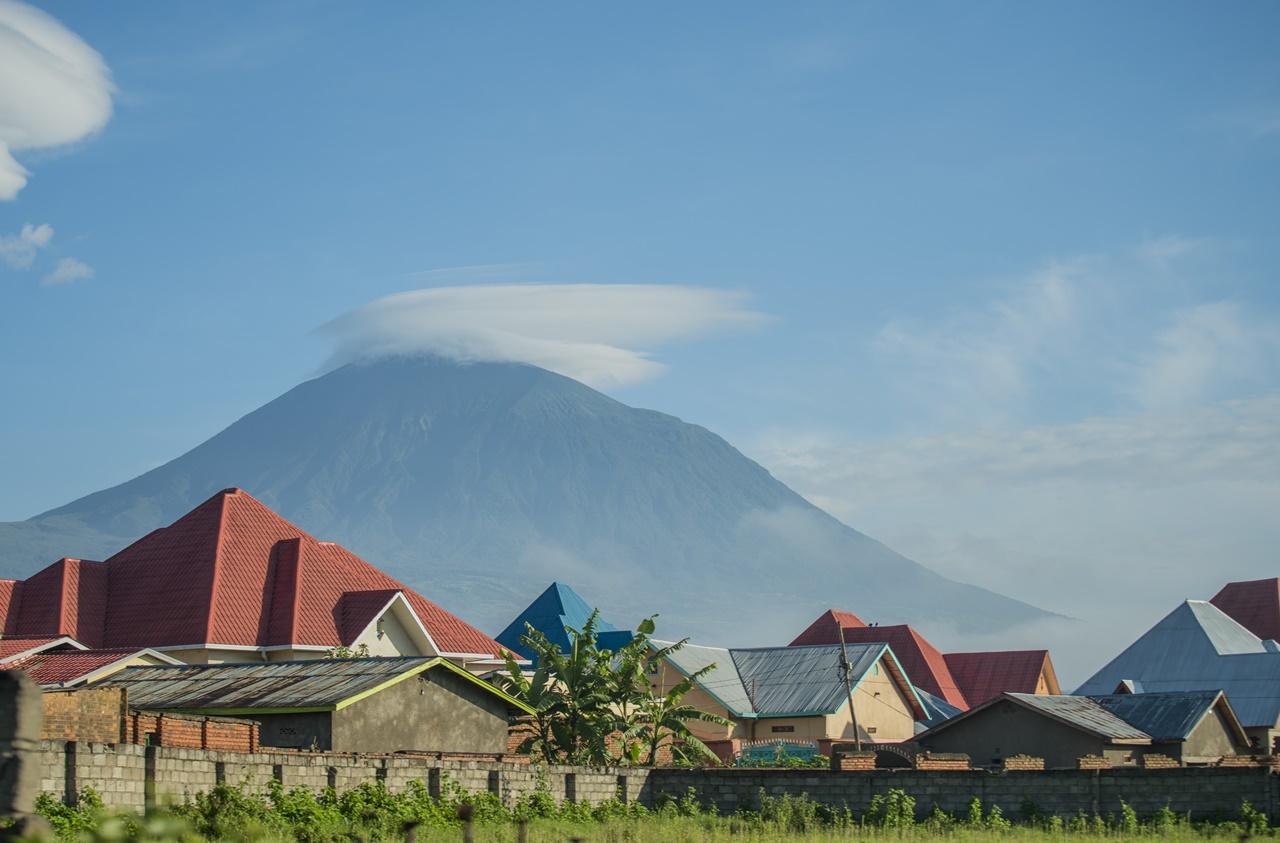
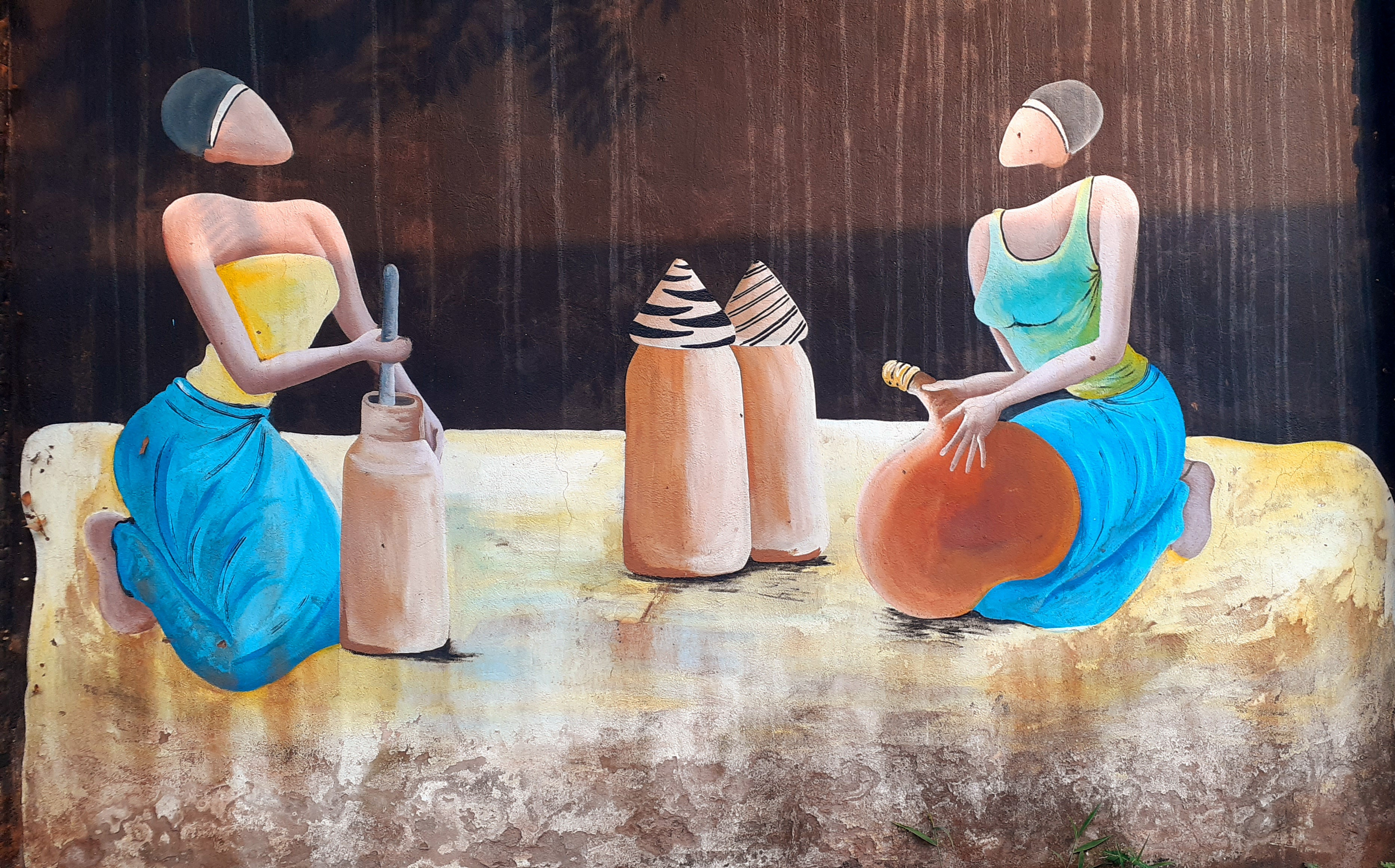
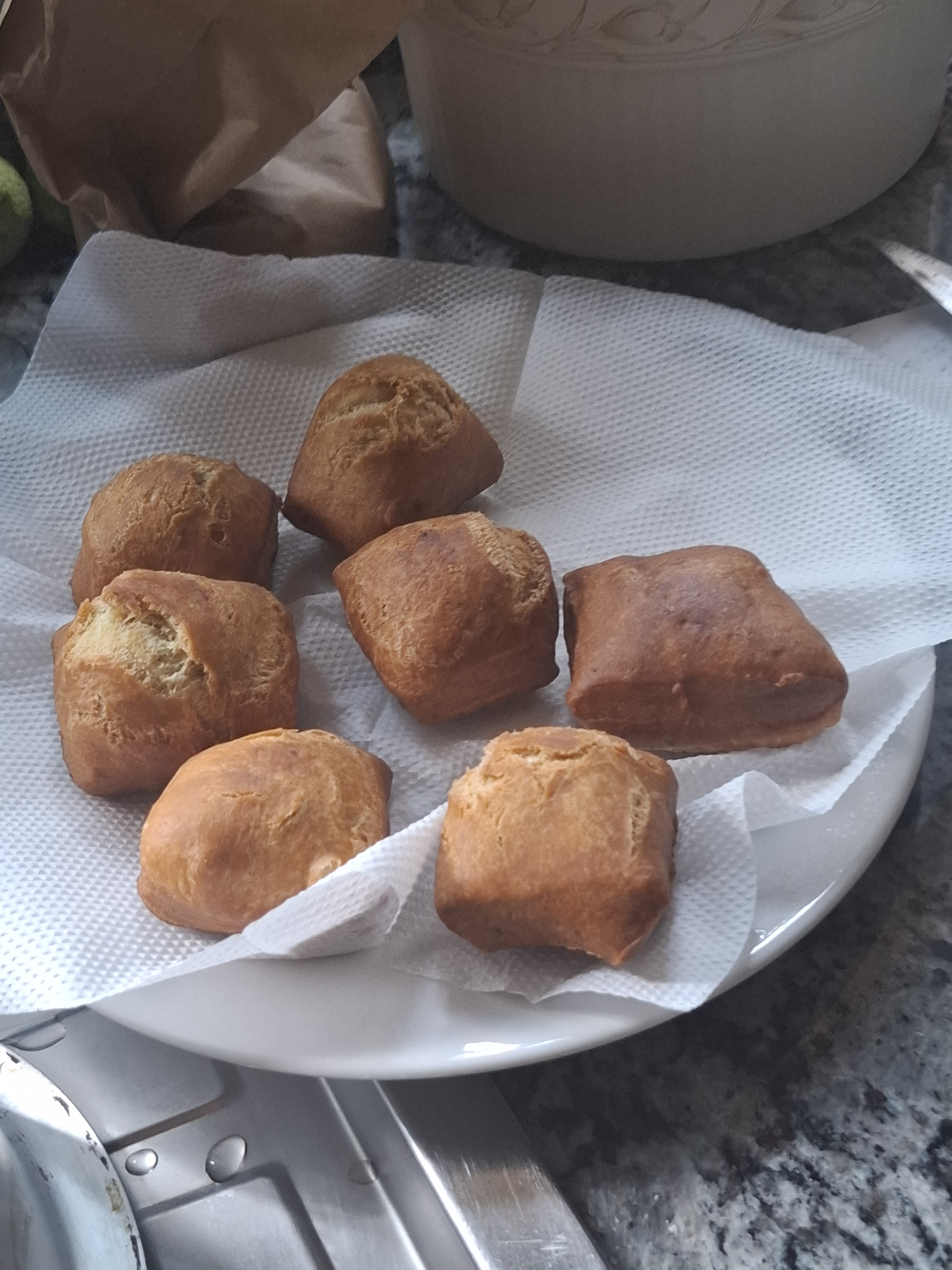
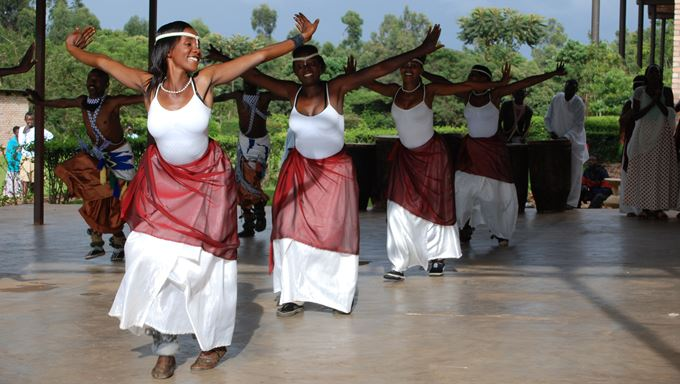
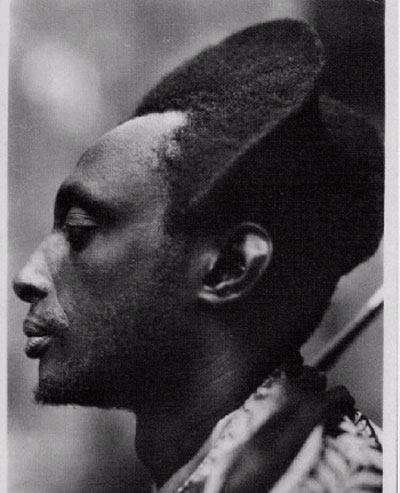
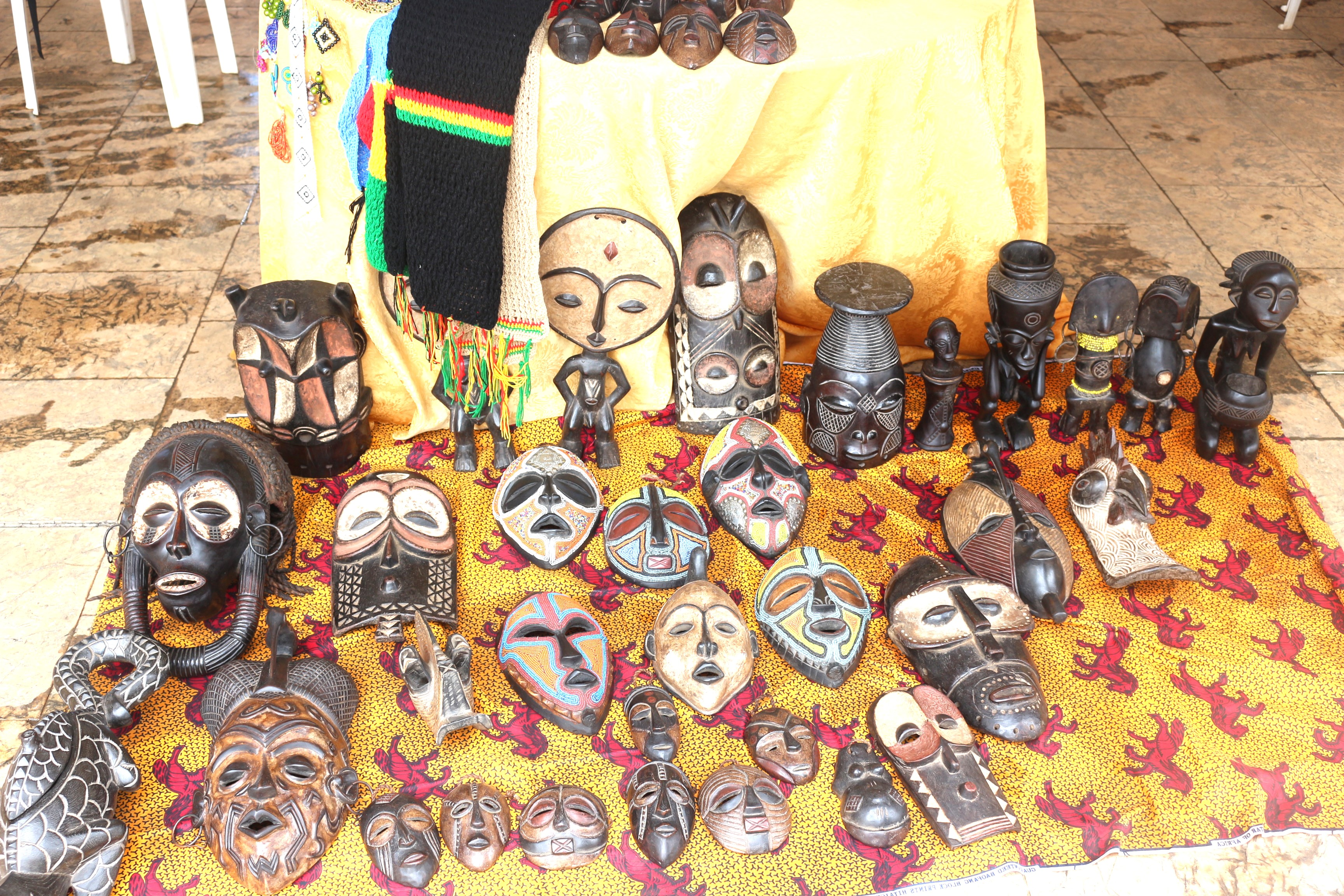
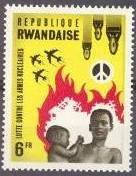
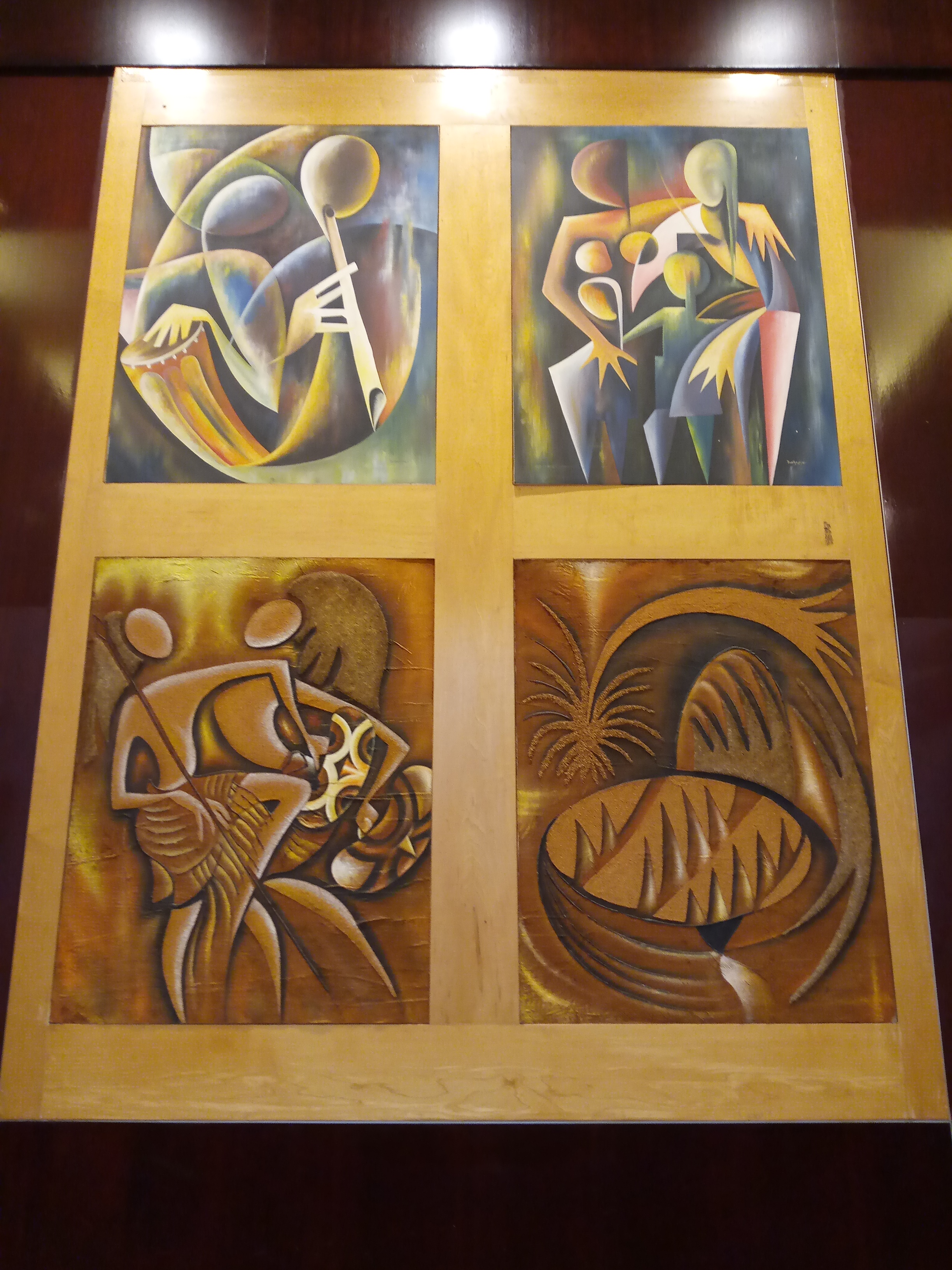
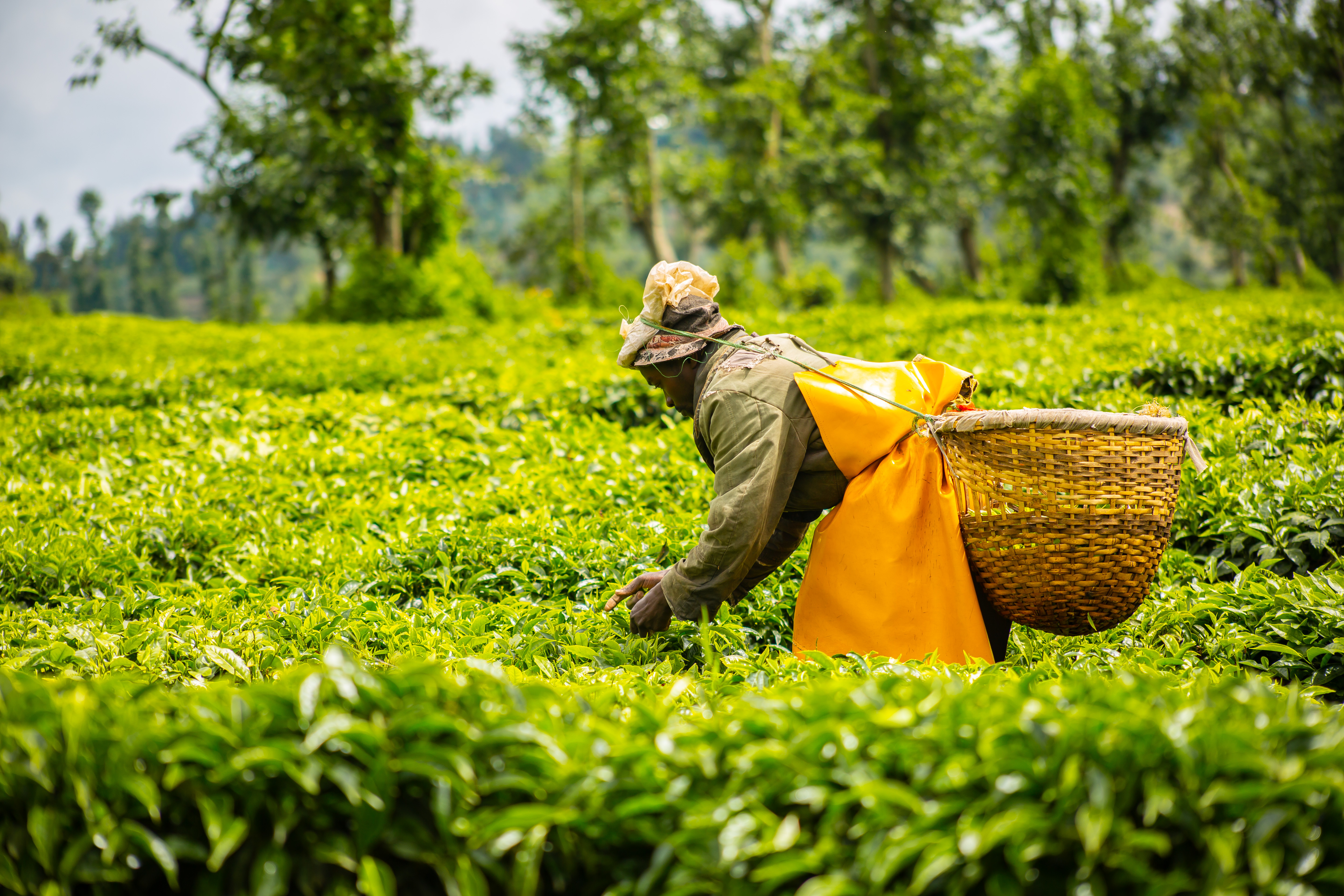
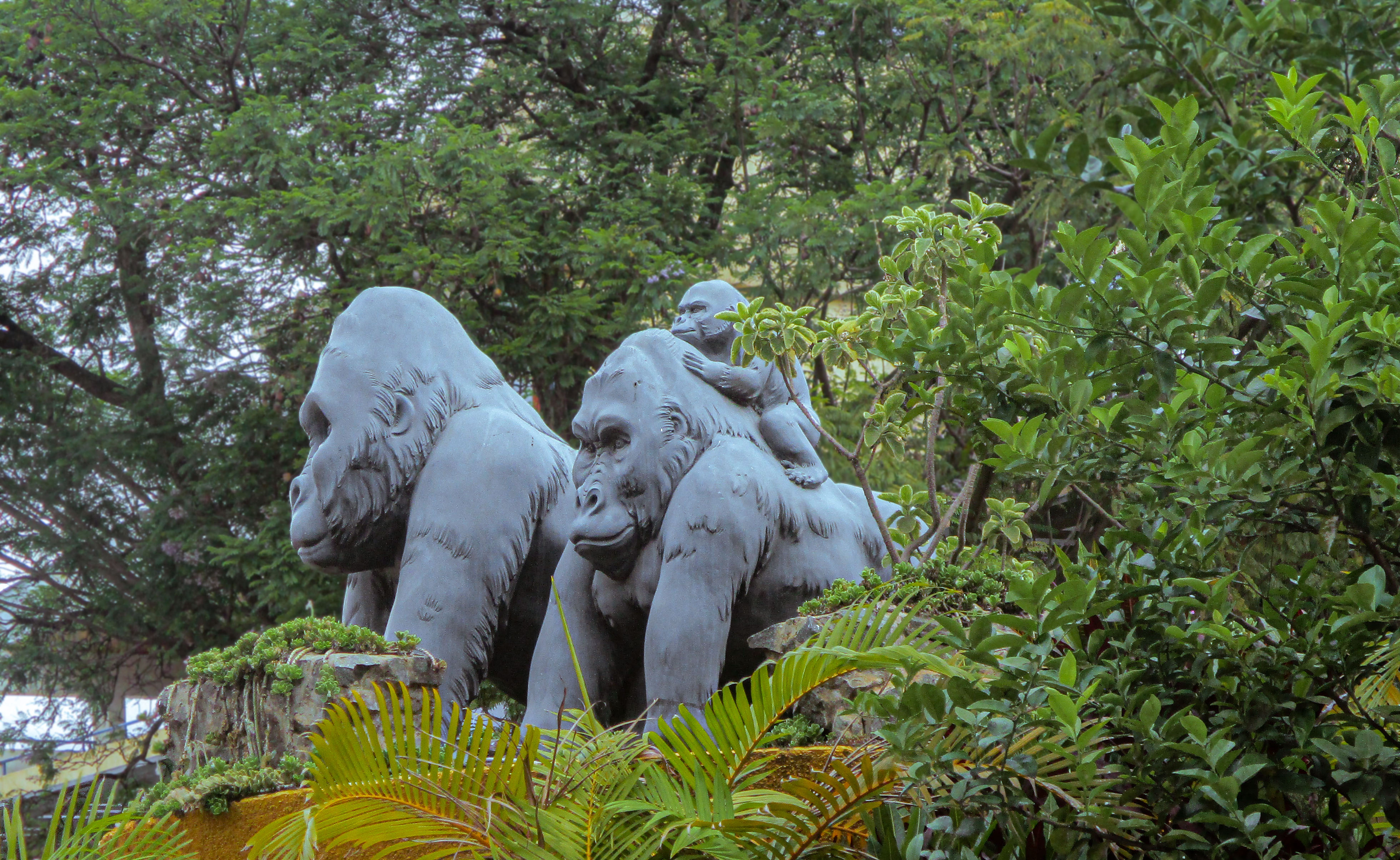
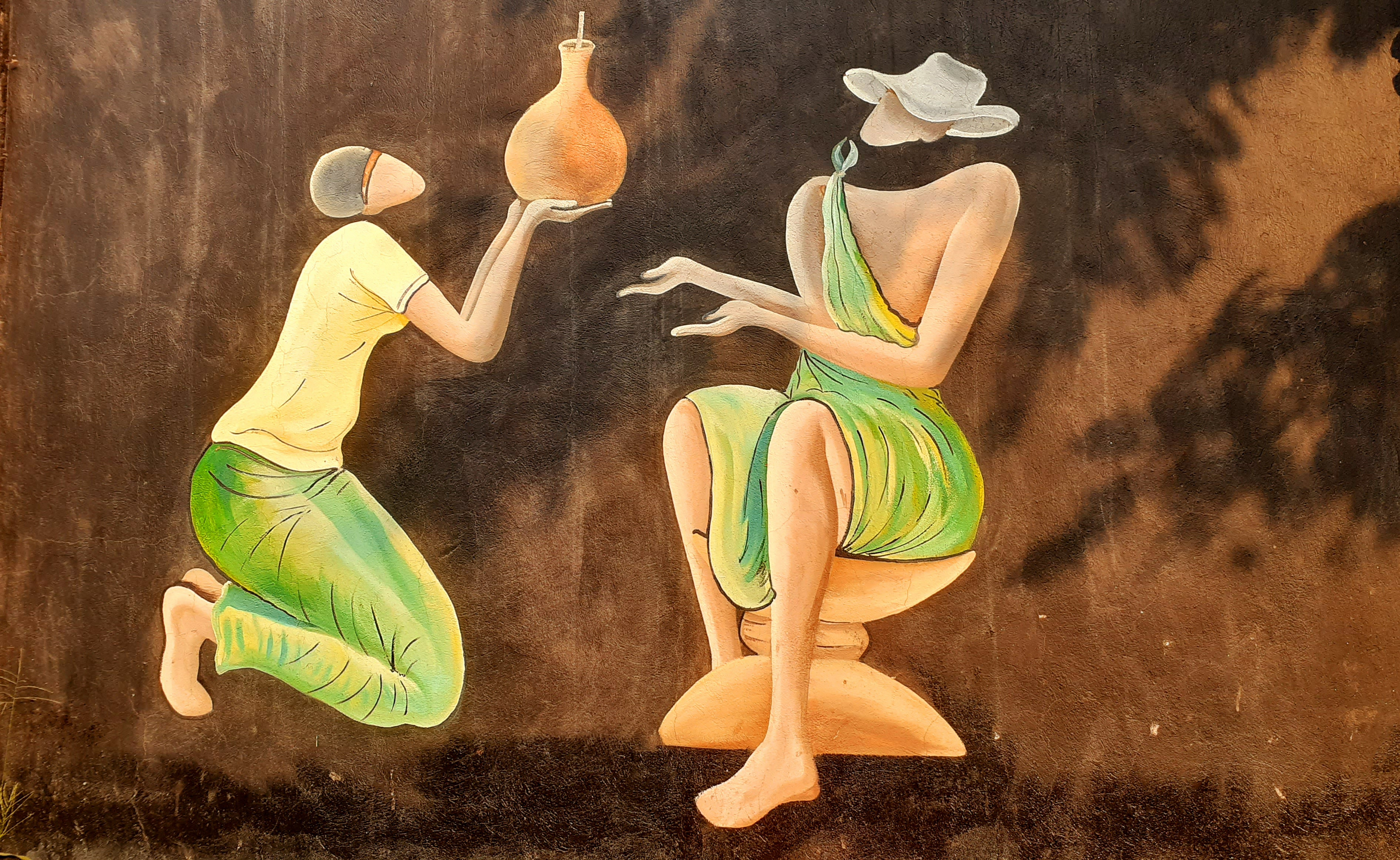
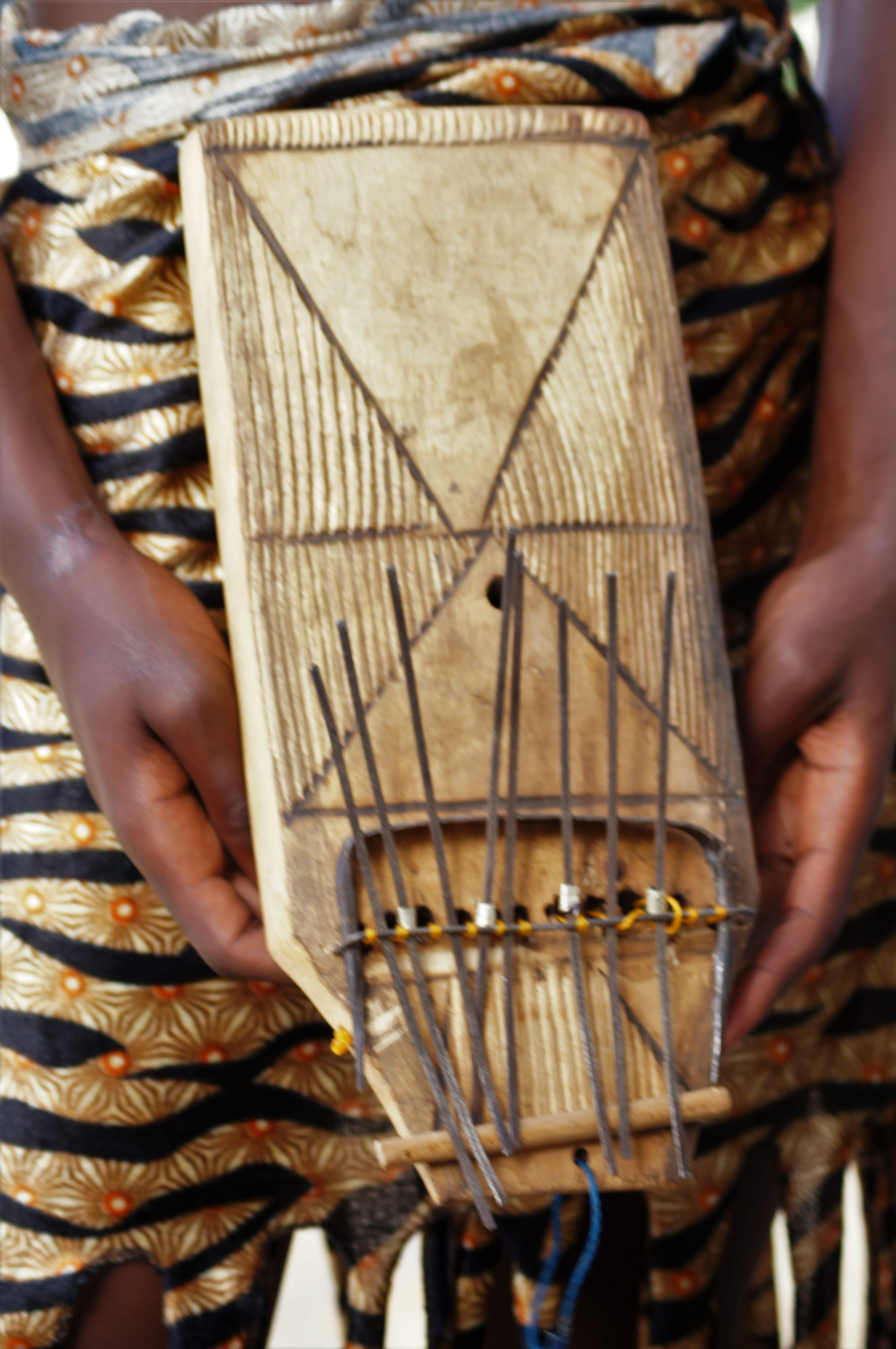
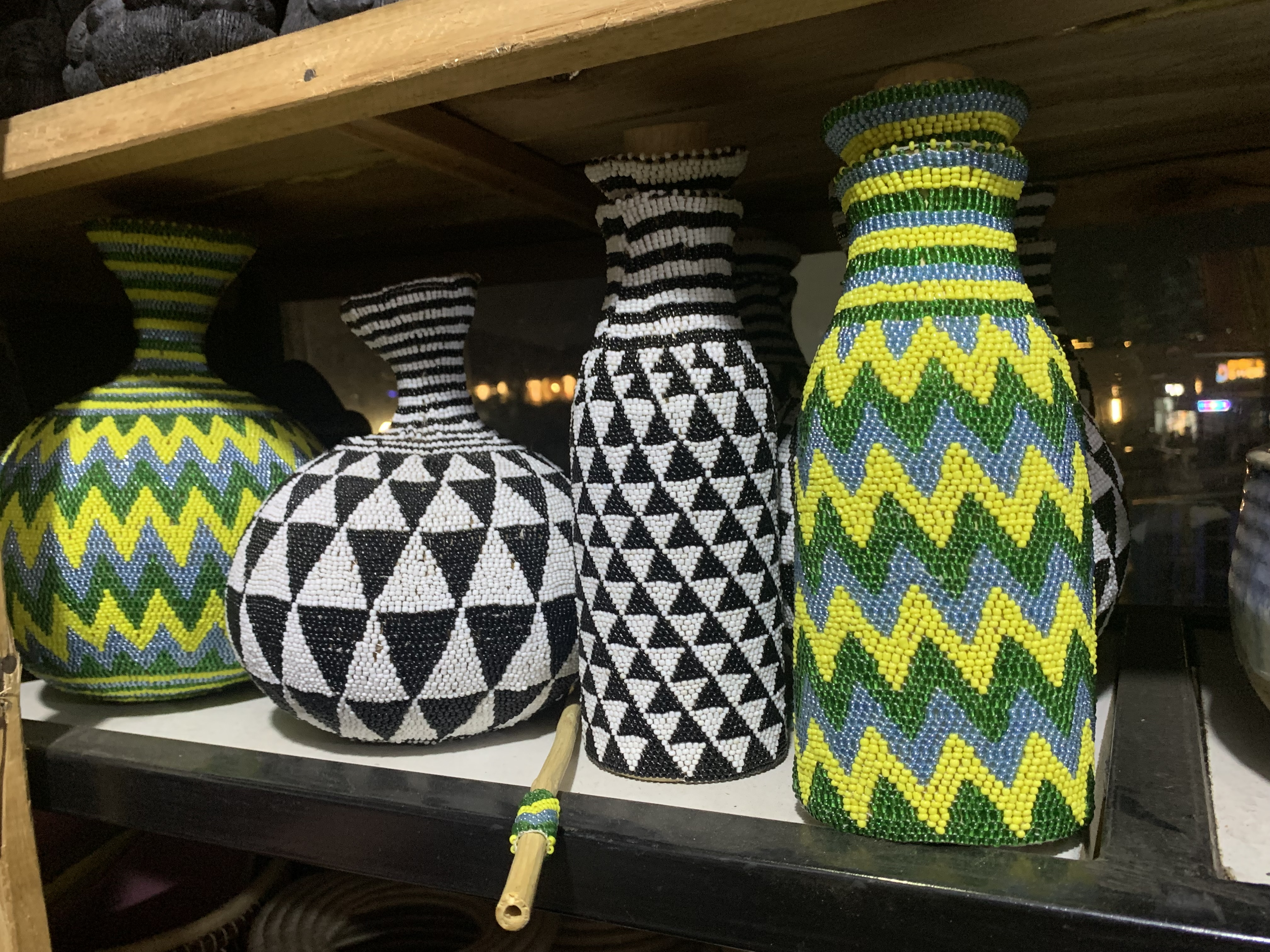

The culture of Rwanda is varied. Unlike many other countries in Africa, Rwanda has been a unified state since precolonial times, populated by the Banyarwanda people who share a single language and cultural heritage.

== Music and dance ==
Music and dance are an integral part of Rwandan ceremonies, festivals, social gatherings, and storytelling. The most famous traditional dance is Intore, a highly choreographed routine consisting of three components - the ballet, performed by women; the dance of heroes, performed by men, and the drums. Traditionally, music is transmitted orally with styles varying between the social groups. Drums are of great importance, the royal drummers having enjoyed high status within the court of the mwami. Drummers usually play together in groups of seven or nine.

Rwanda has a growing popular music industry, influenced by East African, Congolese, and American music. The most popular genres are hip-hop and R&B, often blended with ragga and dance-pop. Popular local artists include The Ben and Meddy, both of whom have won awards, and more recent artists like Miss Shanel, Kitoko, Riderman, Tom Close, King James, Mani Martin, Knowless, Charly na Nina and others.

== Cuisine ==
Rwandan cuisine is based on local staple foods produced by the traditional subsistence agriculture. Historically, it has varied among the country's different ethnic groups. Rwandan staples include bananas, plantains (known as ibitoke), pulses, sweet potatoes, beans, and cassava (manioc). Many Rwandans do not eat meat more than a few times a month. For those who live near lakes and have access to fish, tilapia is popular.

The potato, thought to have been introduced to Rwanda by German and Belgian colonialists, became very popular. Ugali (or ubugali) is a paste made from cassava or maize and water, to form a porridge-like consistency that is eaten throughout East Africa. Isombe is made from mashed cassava leaves and served with dried fish.

Lunch is usually a buffet known as melange, consisting of the above staples and possibly meat. Brochette is the most popular food when eating out in the evening, usually made from goat, but sometimes tripe, beef, pork or fish. In rural areas, many bars have a brochette seller responsible for tending and slaughtering the goats, skewering and barbecuing the meat, and serving it with grilled bananas.

Milk, particularly in a fermented form called ikivuguto, is a common drink throughout the country. Other drinks include a traditional beer called urwagwa, made from sorghum or bananas, which features in traditional rituals and ceremonies. Commercial beers brewed in Rwanda include Primus, Mützig, and Amstel.

== Arts and crafts ==
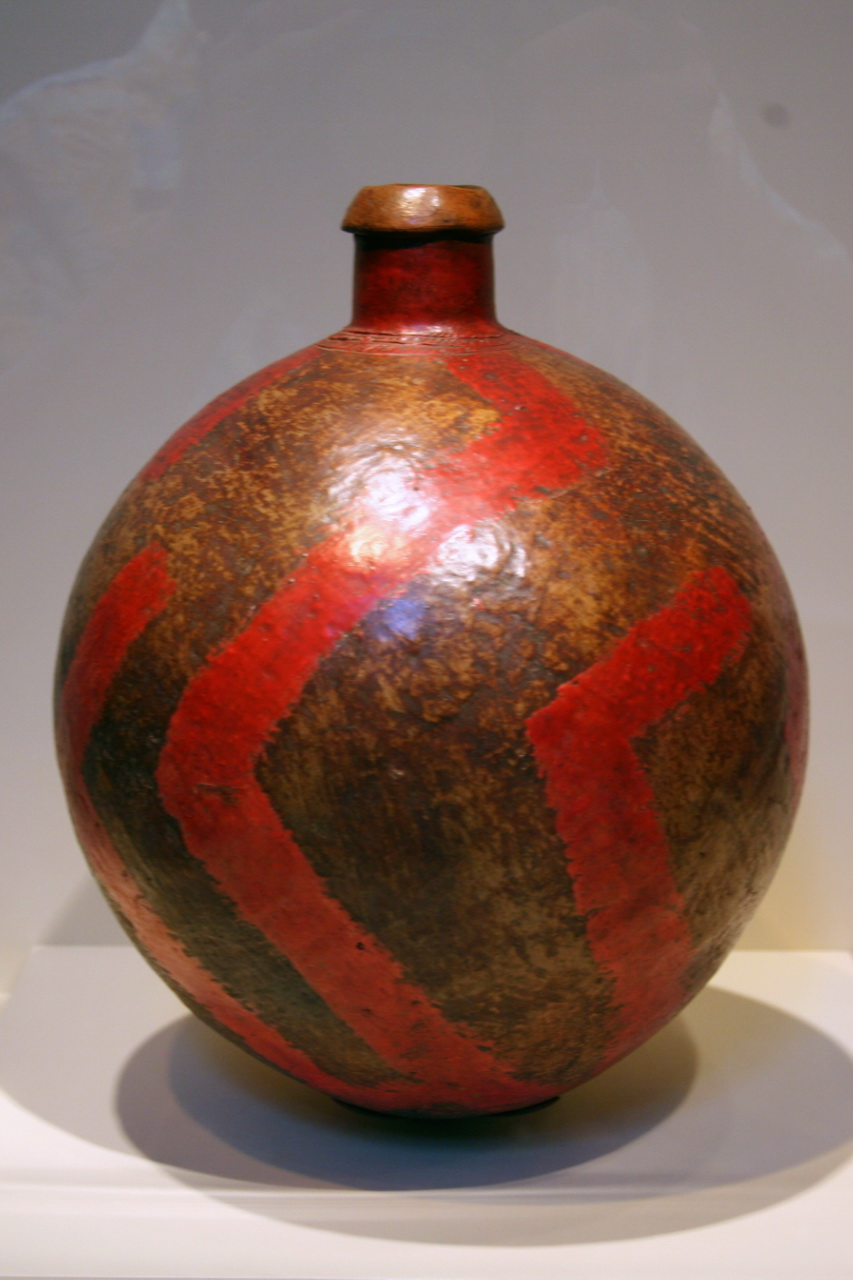
Bottle, Tswa people, Rwanda, early 20th century

Traditional arts and crafts are produced throughout the country, although most originated as functional items rather than purely for decoration. Woven baskets and bowls are especially common.

The south east of Rwanda is noted for imigongo, a unique cow dung art, whose history dates back to when the region was part of the independent Gisaka kingdom. The dung is mixed with natural soils of various colours and painted into patterned ridges, forming geometric shapes.

Other art and crafts include pottery/ceramic, painting and wood carving are made mostly by artist students from Ecole d'Art de Nyundo, the unique school of art Rwanda had from 1959 until today.

== Literature and performing arts ==
Rwanda does not have a long history of written literature, but there is a strong oral tradition ranging from poetry to folk stories. In particular the pre-colonial royal court developed traditions of ibitekerezo (epic musical poetry), ubucurabwenge (royal genealogies typically recited at coronation ceremonies), and ibisigo (royal poems). Many of the country's moral values and details of history have been passed down through the generations. The most famous Rwandan literary figure was Alexis Kagame (1912–1981), who carried out and published research into the oral tradition as well as writing his own poetry.

The Rwandan Genocide resulted in the emergence of a literature of witness accounts, essays, and fiction by a new generation of writers, such as Benjamin Sehene (who published the first francophone Rwandan novel since the genocide, Le Feu sous la soutane (Fire under the Cassock), published 2005) and Fred Mfuranzima.

Dorcy Rugamba is the son of Cyprien and Daphrose Rugamba, who were murdered along with six of their ten children in the genocide, and has written and produced many plays and other works about the genocide. He is the author of the 2024 memoir Hewa Rwanda, une lettre aux absents.

== Film industry ==
A number of films have been produced about the genocide, including the Golden Globe-nominated Hotel Rwanda and Shooting Dogs. The latter was filmed in Rwanda itself, and featured survivors in the cast.

Neptune Frost is a 2021 American-Rwandan Afrofuturist musical co-directed by Saul Williams and Rwandan-born artist and cinematographer Anisia Uzeyman. It stars Cheryl Isheja, Elvis Ngabo, Bertrand "Kaya Free" Ninteretse, Eliane Umuhire, Dorcy Rugamba, and other Rwandan actors.

== See also ==
- Rwandan names
- Languages of Rwanda
- List of writers from Rwanda
- Kunyaza

== Citations ==
=== Sources ===
- Adekunle, Julius (2007). Culture and Customs of Rwanda. Westport, CT: Greenwood Publishing Group. ISBN 9780313331770.
- Auzias, Dominique (2007). Rwanda (in French). Paris: Petit Futé. ISBN 978-2-7469-2037-8.
- Briggs, Philip; Booth, Janice (2006). Rwanda – The Bradt Travel Guide (3rd ed.). London: Bradt Travel Guides. ISBN 978-1-84162-180-7.
- Prunier, Gérard (1995). The Rwanda Crisis, 1959–1994: History of a Genocide (2nd ed.). London: C. Hurst & Co. Publishers. ISBN 978-1-85065-243-4.
