= Dream Boys =

Rwandan R&B Afropop Duo

Dream Boyz
- Origin: Rwanda
- Genres: R&B
- Years active: 2009-present
- Label: Kina Music
- Members: Platini P; Claude Mujyanama

Dream Boys is a Rwandan R&B duo composed of Nemeye Platini (known as Platini) and Claude Mujyanama (called T.M.C.). The group was formed in 2009 and has toured throughout Rwanda and across the region, including member countries of the East African Community, such as Uganda.

== History ==
Platini and Mujyanama have been friends since childhood and are both university graduates. The duo writes their own songs, which are produced by studio professionals in Uganda and Rwanda. They are managed under the label Kina Music.

Their first album, Sinzika, was released in 2009 and was a major success in Rwanda. The first single off the album, Magorwa, achieved widespread popularity across the country. Their second release, Isaano, was well received but garnered less attention than their debut. A third album, Uzambariza Mama, was released in 2012. The duo has also collaborated with other local and regional artists on numerous singles, including No one like me with Ugandan Eddy Kenzo, Nzagaruka with Burundian T-Max, and Rwanda uri Nziza with Rwandans Kitoko, Urban Boyz, Riderman and Uganda's Radio and Weasel. The band has named Rwandan artists Miss Jojo and Tom Close as inspirations, as well as Tanzanian Ali Kiba.

== Themes ==
The music of Dream Boys addresses themes relating to the challenges of their daily lives in Rwanda. The band has publicly advocated for social causes, including a male circumcision campaign in Ruhango District to reduce prevalence of HIV infection.

== Awards ==
Dream Boys took fourth place in the annual Primus Guma Guma Super Star talent competition, held at Amahoro Stadium in August 2013. The duo has won numerous other awards, including a Pearl of Africa music award.
