= Christopher Muneza =

Rwandan singer

- Born: Muneza Christophe; 30 January 1994 (age 32)
- Origin: Rwanda
- Genres: R&B, AfroPop
- Occupations: Singer, Songwriter
- Instrument: Vocals
- Years active: 2011 - present

Muneza Christophe (born 30 January 1994), commonly known as Christopher Muneza is a Rwandan singer, songwriter and performer.

He was a second-place finisher of Primus Guma Guma Superstar (PGGSS) seasons 6 and 7. He attributes his success to himself and his mentor Clement Ishimwe, who auditioned Muneza when he was 15 years old. In 2010, he started working with Kina Music House that also contains many artists including Butera Knowless and started making songs such as "Sigaho", "Amahitamo", "Ishema", and featured in Like a Queen by Lil G written by Rapper Racine. In 2017, this artist participated in the Primus Guma Guma Super Star competition where he said that after "PGGSS", he would no longer work with Kina Music.
