= Amalon =

Rwandan singer and songwriter

Amani Bizimana (born 1996), known professionally as Amalon is a Rwandan singer and songwriter. From Rubavu District, he initially gained recognition by releasing the "Yambi" music video in 2018.

== Early life and education ==
Amalon was born in 1996 in Rubavu district in the western province of Rwanda, to Amran and Uwamahoro Habiba. Amalon attended Kagarama Secondary School for ordinary level and later Integrated Polytechnic Regional Centre (IPRC Kicukiro).

He began his career as a rapper and later ventured into Afrobeat and R&B under the management of 1K Entertainment, a company founded by Pius Rukabuza, known as DJ Pius, a Rwandan singer and renowned DJ until 2021.

His debut single yambi set him up for making a name for himself with various hits that followed such as Byakubaho and Delilah featuring Ally Soudy.

== Performances ==
In 2019, he was among the artists, including Sheebah Karungi from Uganda, Bruce Melodie, Uncle Austin, Riderman, Social Mulah, Active, Safi Madiba, Marina, Queen cha and Jay Polly, who performed at Camp Kigali.

In that year, Amalon was the only Rwandan artist to perform on the stage alongside Burna Boy during the BurnaBoyExperience concert held at the Intare Conference Arena.

== Discography ==
Title	Details
Yambi	Released: 2019; Formats: Digital download
Byukuri	Released: 2019; Formats: Digital download
Byakubaho	Released: 2019; Formats: Digital download
Impanga	Released: 2020; Formats: Digital download
Ngirente	Released: 2019; Formats: Digital download
Tequila	Released: 2021; Formats: Digital download
Derila	Released: 2019; Formats: Digital download
Amabara	Released: 2020; Formats: Digital download
Mpobera	Released: 2020; Formats: Digital download
Fuego	Released: 2020; Formats: Digital download
Wanchekecha	Released: 2021; Formats: Digital download
ON ME	Released: 2022; Formats: Digital download
FAMILY	Released: 2023; Formats: Digital download
D.T.M.N.	Released: 2022; Formats: Digital download

== See also ==
- Music of Rwanda
- Daniel Izere
