= Kickin' It with the Kinks =

2016 Rwandan short film

Kickin' It With The Kinks
- Directed by: Cynthia Butare
- Written by: Cynthia Butare
- Distributed by: Mundia Situmbeko
- Release date: 2016 (Rwanda)
- Running time: 36 min.
- Country: Rwanda
- Language: Kinyarwanda

Kickin' It With The Kinks, is a 2016 Rwandan documentary short film directed by Cynthia Butare as a self-funded film with Mundia Situmbeko and Selina Thompson. The film deals with the issue of whether hair should be straightened or be natural.

In 2011, Butare made the short film Kickin' It With The Kinks for her university project. The film received a prize for best documentary in her department. Later in 2016, Cynthia along with her friend Mundia, decided to produce a longer version of the film. The film received critical acclaim and screened at several international film festivals.

The film received positive reviews and won several awards at international film festivals.
