= Daniel Izere =

Rwandan record producer

- Born: May 11, 1995 (age 30); Kigali
- Occupations: Record producer; Composer; Entrepreneur; Songwriter

Daniel Izere (born 1995) commonly known as Dany Beats, is a Rwandan record producer, sound engineer, songwriter, and entrepreneur in the music industry.

He is best known for his work which includes Sabrina, Ni Wa Ne, Banana, Guma Mu Rugo, and Twifunze. INDUSTRY EP He is also the producer of the soundtracks for Urugwiro village events, a contract he signed in 2021.

Artists Danny Beats has recorded with include Angel Mutoni, Weya Viatora, Kivumbi King, Rita Ange Kagaju, Amalon, Mike Kayihura, Sintex, Bushali, Rapper Racine Rwanda, Kevin Skaa and Gisa cy’Inganzo among others.

== Early life and career ==
Dany Beats was born in Gasabo, and is part of a family of three children, including his twin brother Irimaso Samuel, also known as DJ TrapBoy, and his older brother Bwanakweli Pacifique (P.Lee). His parents are Bwanakweri Dominique and Mushongana Prudence.

He attended several schools for his education, including Lycee De Kigali in 2009, London College of Saint Lawrence in Uganda in 2010, Lycee De La Colombiel in 2011, and SOS Technical High School in 2013. In 2014, he graduated from ADB Nyarutarama with a degree in Electricity Technology.

Later, in 2016, Dany Beats joined the University of Kigali to pursue further studies. After completing high school he joined DreamLand Records. Starting, he produced a single 'Bad Girl Swag' by Angel Mutoni later, he also produced 'Empty House' by Weya Viatora which went on to be played on international radio stations like Voice of America in 2015. Since 2015, Dany has played a significant role in rising of Rwandan artists like Kivumbi King, Rita Ange Kagaju, Amalon, Sintex, Kevin Skaa, Mike Kayihura and others. Dany is currently working as an independent music producer.
