= Julien Bmjizzo =

Rwandan music director (born 1994)

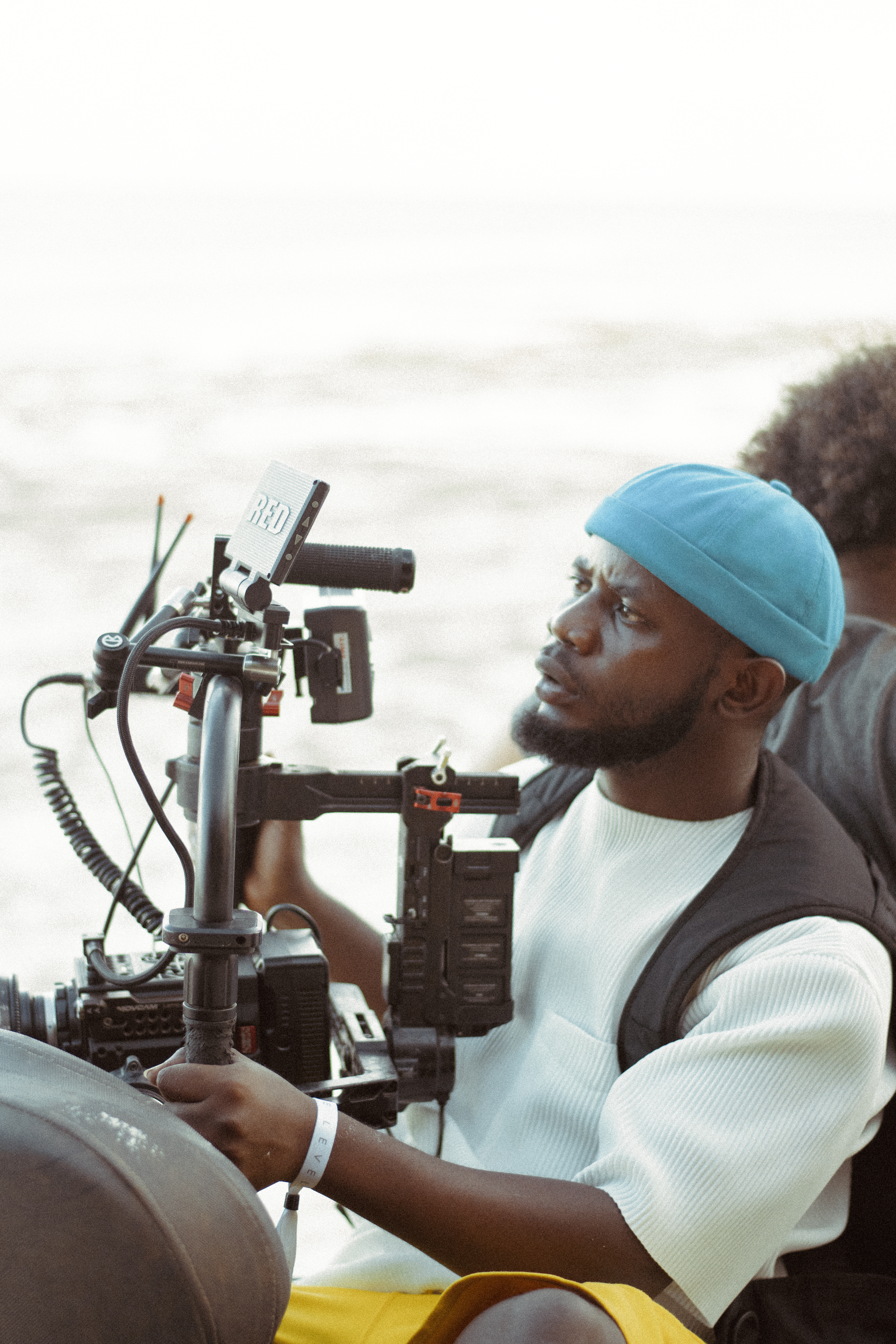
- Born: Irankunda Julien; 27 February 1994 (age 32); Kigali, Rwanda
- Occupations: Music video director, Filmmaker, Cinematographer
- Years active: 2015–present
- Website: www.julienbmjizzo.com

Irankunda Julien, commonly known as Julien Bmjizzo (born February 27, 1994, in Kimihurura, Gasabo to Kwibeshya Sébastien and Kasine Marie Grace), is a Rwandan music video director, and founder of record label called Bproud Music.

== Early life and education ==
Born in Kigali, Rwanda, Bmjizzo went to a school known as ESAPAG Gitwe in Rwanda but dropped out at the end of his high school in 2011 due to the fact that his family was moving to Belgium. He continued his further education in Belgium at a school called Virgo Plus where he completed his high school education in Computer Science Management and Accounting. He later attended a university in Belgium where he studied Communication and Multi media.

== Music career ==
In 2015, Bmjizzo established BproudMusic, a Belgium-based music production platform that focuses on audio visual productions. In the same 2021, Bmjizzo produced his own song titled Kamwe which featured eleven Hip hop and RnB Rwandan artists.

== Cinematography ==
Since 2015, Bmjizzo has worked with Rwandan and Tanzanian musicians such as such Diamond Platnumz, The Ben and Bruce Melodie. Julien Bmjizzo worked on his first music project, Only you by The Ben ft Ben Kayiranga, as a video director in 2015. In 2021 Bmjizzo shot and directed a song titled Why by The Ben and Diamond Platnumz. This music project which went viral further brought Bmjizzo on greater spotlight on the global music scene. This first music project brought him to limelight in the Rwandan music industry and other countries as he started doing more music video jobs working as a director. Bmjizzo has produced over 500 music videos.

Year	Video	Artist
2016	Only you	Ben kayiranga ft The Ben
2019	Katerina	Bruce Melodie
2020	Madede	Marina
2020	Worokoso	Marina
2021	Byukuri	Bulldog
2021	I'm in love	Babo
2021	Zunguza	Mk isacco ft Lil saako
2021	Kamwe	Julien Bmjizzo & BABALAO ft Rwandan allstars
2022	Why	The Ben ft Diamond Platnumz
