= Calvin Mbanda =

Rwandan singer and songwriter

Mbanda John, commonly known by his stage name Calvin Mbanda, born (October 26, 1998 (age 27) in Kinyinya, Gasabo District, Rwanda is a Rwandan singer, songwriter and performer. He started his music career in 2019. He partly credits his success to his label owned by BadRam, who auditioned Mbanda when he was 21 years old. In 2019, he started working with The Mane Music House which also contains artists including Jay Polly and started making songs such as "Aye", "Tiktak", "Aba People". He released songs featuring Ariel Wayz, Marina, Zizou Al Pacino, P Fla, Bulldogg,Tuyishime Joshua, Safi Madiba, Victor Rukotana, Mbanda is well known for his first singles. All of his songs were nominated in three awards including Kiss summer awards, The choice awards, Isangonamuzika awards, after which Mbanda mentioned he would no longer work with The Mane Music House.
