= Tuyishime Joshua =

Rwandan musician (1988–2021)

Jay Polly
- Born: Tuyishime Joshua; 5 July 1988; Kigali, Rwanda
- Died: 2 September 2021 (aged 33); Kigali, Rwanda
- Resting place: Rusororo, Kigali, Rwanda
- Occupation: Musician
- Years active: 2006–2021
- Known for: Music and charity work

Tuyishime Joshua (5 July 1988 – 2 September 2021), also known as Jay Polly, was a Rwandan musician.

Jay Polly was the winner of Primus Guma Guma Super Star seasons 4 (PGGSS4). He was one of the successful hip-hop artists in Rwanda and former member of local hip-hop gang called Tuff Gang with other rappers like Fireman, BullDogg, P Fla, and Green P.

In 2014, Jay Poly was the brand ambassador of MTN Rwanda.

== Early life ==
Jay Polly was born on 5 July 1988, in Gikondo, Kigali city, Rwanda. He was the second child in a family of three including his older brother, Uwera Jean Maurice known as Uncle Morris, a journalist of RBA Rwanda. Jay Polly attended Kinunga primary school and former ETO Kicukiro now Integrated Polytechnic Regional College (IPRC) Kigali.

== Music career ==
=== Early life ===
Jay Polly started writing and recording songs in 2003, while he was in high school with his then-friend and now rapper; Green P with other friends, they formed a music group named G5. In 2004, the group was separated and Jay started recording solo music. He released his single Money, followed by hit songs Ndacyariho, Ibyo ubona, and many more.

=== Tuff Gang ===
In 2007, Jay Polly and Green P recorded in ONB studio where producer Lick Lick was working. Lick Lick was recording for various Rwandan then-upcoming artists; now stars including King James, Meddy, and The Ben and other 3 young rappers BullDogg, Fireman, and P Fla. Lick Lick realized that the five young rappers had the same vision and potential. He decided to connect them and created a music group named Tuff Gang.

=== PGGSS ===
In 2011 and 2013, Jay Polly was nominated in Primus Guma Guma Super Star (PGGSS) but he did not win it. In 2013, he signed a 3-year contract with Touch Records where he released various hit songs including Deux fois Deux, Ndacyariho Ndahumeka, Malaika, and Siribateri ft Bruce Melodie to mention a few. In 2014, he was nominated in PGGSS season 4 which he won on 30 August same year.
