= Rwandan names =

Naming conventions used in Rwanda

Rwandan names are personal names used in Rwanda. A modern Rwandan name typically includes an individual Kinyarwanda surname and may include an additional given name. Rwanda's civil-registration system treats a person's names as their full name and does not use inherited family names in the Western sense.

A distinctive feature of the Rwandan system is that the surname is generally not hereditary in the sense of an inherited family name. A child normally receives an individual name at birth; siblings usually do not share the same names, and children do not inherit the name of either parent. As a result, a Rwandan name does not normally identify a family line, and two people having the same name is usually coincidental rather than evidence that they are related.

== Structure ==
Modern Rwandan personal names commonly consist of a Kinyarwanda surname and a given name. The Kinyarwanda surname is chosen for the child and is not normally inherited from a parent; siblings therefore usually have different surnames. The given name may be Christian or Muslim, such as Jean, Marie, Patrick, Grace, Muhammad, or Fatuma.

Rwandan passports follow international travel-document conventions and distinguish between a surname and given names. In Rwanda's civil-registration system, however, inherited family names are not used in the Western sense; ID4Africa notes that official documents may use "Names" rather than separate "First Name" and "Family Name" fields.

== The Kinyarwanda surname ==
=== Formation and semantics ===
Kinyarwanda surnames are often meaningful words, phrases, or clauses. Some names combine verbal and nominal elements into a single orthographic word, allowing a name to express a statement about the child, the family, circumstances of birth, or religious belief.

Examples include:

- Hakizimana - "God heals"
- Iradukunda - "God loves us"
- Nshimiyimana - "I thank God"
- Mugisha - "blessing"
- Ishimwe - "gratitude"

=== Motivation for names ===
Rwandan surnames may reflect religious belief, family circumstances, or events associated with a child's birth. Many names are theophoric, referring to Imana ("God"). God's presence in Rwandan public life has been expressed in several ways, including through theophoric names.

Other names refer to family circumstances or events associated with birth. Examples include Gisubizo ("answer"), Nyiramvura ("of rain" or "associated with rain") and Mvuyekure ("I came from far away").

== Written order and capitalisation ==
=== The "surname first" format ===
In many Rwandan contexts, the Kinyarwanda surname is written before the given name, often in uppercase. This order is used in Kinyarwanda and French-language publications and helps identify which element of the name is the surname.

For example, in the written form MUGISHA Jean, Mugisha is the Kinyarwanda surname and Jean is the given name.

=== Official records ===
Rwanda's civil-registration naming system does not use inherited family names in the Western sense, and official documents may list a person's names under a single field, "Names", rather than separate "First Name" and "Family Name" fields. In such records, the Kinyarwanda surname is commonly written first, followed by the given name. The national identity card includes the field label Amazina/names.

== Address in spoken life ==
In ordinary speech, Rwandans commonly address one another by the given name rather than by the Kinyarwanda surname. The surname may be used where a more formal or identifying form is needed, especially when distinguishing a person in written or official contexts.

A parent may also be referred to by the name of a child; for example, a woman whose child is named Teta may be called Mama Teta. This practice is an example of teknonymy.

== International and database contexts ==
Because Rwandan surnames are not inherited family names, Rwandan names can be difficult to fit into systems that treat surnames as family identifiers. Rwanda's civil-registration naming system does not use the concept of family names, which can cause confusion when Rwandan names are transcribed into Western name formats. Siblings normally have different names, while unrelated people may share the same given or full name by coincidence. Most Rwandans have names particular to themselves and do not share a common family name; when two people have the same name, this is usually coincidental rather than evidence that they are related.

== See also ==
- Kinyarwanda
- Culture of Rwanda
- Personal name
