= Cynthia Butare =

Rwandan-Swiss filmmaker

- Born: Geneva, Switzerland
- Education: Manchester Metropolitan University
- Occupations: Director, videographer, blogger
- Years active: 2011–present
- Website: www.cynthiabutare.com

Cynthia Butare, is a Rwandan–Swiss filmmaker as well as a videographer. She is best known as the director of critically acclaimed Rwandan film Kickin' It With The Kinks.

== Personal life ==
Butare was born in about 1988 in Geneva, Switzerland. She lived there until the end of high school and she then moved to the UK for higher studies.

== Career ==
She obtained a bachelor's degree in Digital Media and Communications and later completed a Master's in Documentary Practice at Manchester Metropolitan University. In 2011, she made the short film Kickin' It With The Kinks for her university project. The film received a prize for best documentary in her department. Later in 2016, Cynthia along with her friend Mundia, decided to produce a longer version of the film. The film received critical acclaim and screened at several international film festivals. In the same year, she started her own company, 'CB Production'.

While a teenager, she started blogging in 2003. Even though she stopped blogging after three years, she restarted it in 2012. In 2013, Butare received the Award for Best Blog of The Year by the BEFFTA. However, she moved to Rwanda in 2014. While in Rwanda, she made her second documentary film, Ishimwa: From Bloodshed To Grace. It was screened as part of the Rwanda Film Festival. She was working on a project called The Return in 2015.

== Filmography ==
Year	Film	Role	Genre	Ref.
2013	Tears & Blood Behind Made In China	Videographer	Documentary short film	
2016	Kickin' It With The Kinks	Director	Documentary film	
2019	Ishimwa: From Bloodshed To Grace	Director	Documentary film	
