= Racine Kamatari =

Rwandan rapper and songwriter

- Also known as: Racine
- Born: Kamatari Thierry; October 9, 1996 (age 29); Rwanda
- Origin: Rwanda
- Occupations: Musician, Rapper, songwriter, actor

Kamatari Thierry, popularly known by his stage name as Racine Rwanda (born in Kigali, Rwanda) is a Rwandan rapper, poet and songwriter.

Racine acts in Rwandan series called Impanga. He was nominated for best male actor in Impanga Series Awards. His song Crush was a second-place finisher of best Rwandan music on RFI. Among the songs he wrote include Like Queen by Lil G feat Christopher Muneza and Katapilla by Bruce Melodie.

== Early life ==
He's the son of Rutajoga Innocent, and Gahongayire Genevieve, being the second born among five children. He's the father of Inganzo Aiden Lyric who was born in 2023.

Racine is a Rwandan rapper and is considered to be one of the most talented rappers from Rwanda in the late 2010s, who rose to fame precisely in 2017 after releasing his first hit song “Agahugu”.

His rap is largely rooted in poetry as he used to be a poet way before becoming a rapper back in secondary school. Later on, he became a rapper by the stage name “G-Hero” where he would perform at school.

Before having a debut album, Racine collaborated on a couple of projects, one being a megahit WAKIWAKI Remix featuring all-stars under Ish Kevin's ownership. Racine played a big role in creating music cyphers that were not a thing in Rwanda back in days. He made one of the remarkable cyphers named “Imizi cypher” in 2018 that showcased a lot of talented rappers. He was said to be sending subliminal shots to his fellow rappers in his single KAREZI He surfaced on social media in 2021 due to his fastest rap verse appeared on GANG-LA ft WAWA. He is also a ghostwriter for a lot of artists.

== Discography ==
Racine had his debut album in 2022, RWAHIPHOP, figuratively means Rwandan Hip Hop that has 13 singles, with a controversial collaboration called IKANZU that was a talk of the city due to its uniqueness that was unusual because it was so horrorcore. This is the only album he has got so far. In 2023, he released an Extended Play (EP) called 2023AD. His 2022 debut album RwaHiphop.

- 12 singles featured in over 1000 songs.

=== Singles ===
- 2017: Agahugu ft Sean brizz
- 2017: Karezi ft Extra
- 2018: Nzura
- 2018: Ntakundi
- 2018: Bizacamo ft G-Bruce
- 2019: Yarakwibagiwe ft Passy Kizito
- 2019: Io
- 2020: Overnight ft Mugaba
- 2020: Nsengera
- 2021: Crush
- 2021: Ntako
- 2021: Ibaruwa ft Aime Bluestone

=== Album studios ===
Rwahiphop

- Intro (Rwahiphop)
- Kamatari
- Nkawe ft Symphony Band
- Interlude ft Mazimpaka Prime
- Injajwa
- Mwuzukuru
- Ikanzu
- Wait for me
- Letter
- Mom
- Ibugande
- No name
- Story

=== Ep ===
Hinduka

- Hinduka ep1 ft King ohallah
- Hinduka ep2 ft King ohallah
- Hinduka ep3 ft King ohallah

== Cinematography ==
Racine acted in Impanga series in 2020 where he started with episode 3, season 1, and he was voted for the best male actor of the show. In the show, he appears to be an impoverished young boy coming from rural areas trying to make a living in the Kigali City by doing rap music.
