= The Ben =

Rwandan singer

- Also known as: The Ben
- Born: Mugisha Benjamin; January 9, 1987 (age 39); Kampala, Uganda
- Origin: Rwanda
- Genres: R&B Afrobeats
- Occupations: Musician, singer, songwriter
- Instrument: Vocals
- Spouse: Uwicyeza Pamella

Benjamin Mugisha (born January 9, 1987), known professionally as The Ben, is a Rwandan singer-songwriter.

== Career ==
In 2010, he moved to the United States where he collaborated with Detroit based hip-hop artist Mike-E Ellison. Later, he was invited to perform at the UN headquarters. Ben's song "I'm in Love", released in October 2012, led to the creation of a new music category at the 2012 Salax Music Award Presentations in Rwanda making him the first ever recipient of Award for Best Music Artist in the Diaspora.

In 2021 Julien Bmjizzo a Rwandan Music video director shot and directed a song titled Why by The Ben and Diamond Platnumz.

== Personal life ==
He was born on January 9, 1987, in Kampala, Uganda.

The Ben is married to Uwicyeza Pamella.

== Discography ==
=== Singles ===
- Urarenze
- Ese Nibyo
- Amahirwe yanyuma
- Incuti nyancuti
- Wigenda
- Amaso Ku Maso
- I'm in Love (2012)
- I can See
- Habibi
- Fine girl
- Naremeye
- Ndaje
- Vazi (2019)
- Suko (2019)
- Ngufite kumutima (2020)
- Ni Forever
- Indabyo Zanjye (2025)

=== Collabos ===
- Binkolera ft Sheebah Karungi from Uganda
- No you no life ft B2C of Uganda
- Ngufite Kumutima ft ZIZOU AL PACINO
- This is love ft Rema Namakula from Uganda
- Why ft Diamond Platnumz from Tanzania
- Lose control ft Meddy (Rwanda)
- Sikosa ft Kevin Kade, Element Eleeh (Rwanda)
- best friend ft Bwiza (Rwanda)
- Umugisha ft vincent (Rwanda)

== Awards ==
Ben was recognized as "Best Afro R&B Singer of the Year" at the Salax Awards, a national music awards show Rwanda in 2008–2009. In 2009–2010 he again received "Best Afro R&B Singer of the Year as well as "Best Male Artist". In 2010–11, he won "Best Song" Ben received a Salas Award song of the year in 2010–2011.
