= Jean-Paul Samputu =

- Born: Jean-Paul Samputu; March 15, 1962 (age 64); Butare, Rwanda
- Genres: Soukous, rumba, reggae, afrobeat, gospel
- Occupation: Musician
- Instruments: Vocals, guitar
- Years active: 1977–present
- Formerly of: Nyampinga

Jean-Paul Samputu (born 15 March 1962) is a Rwandan singer, songwriter, and musician. A winner of the Kora Award in 2003, Samputu travels the world as a cultural ambassador for Rwanda.

Born in Rwanda in 1962, Samputu began singing in 1977 in a church choir, and was influenced by traditional and contemporary music, including Stevie Wonder, Bob Marley, Jimmy Cliff, and Lionel Richie. He arrived in the US in 2004 for Ten Years Remembering, an event commemorating the 10th anniversary of the genocide in Rwanda.

Samputu sings in six languages(Kinyarwanda, Swahili, Lingala, Ganda, French and English) and in styles ranging from soukous, rhumba and reggae, to traditional Rwandan 5/8, Afrobeat, pygmy, and gospel. He combines unique musical traditions from all regions of Rwanda, among them, Intwatwa, Umushayayo, Imparamba, and Ikinimba.

== Early life ==
Jean Paul Samputu was born on 15 March 1962 in Butare, Rwanda.

== Awards and honours ==
- Kora Award for Most Promising African Male Artist, 2003
- 2006 International Songwriting Competition: 1st-place winner for World Music for "Psalm 150"
- Inter Religious and International Federation for World Peace: Ambassador of Peace, 2007

== Discography ==
=== Albums ===
Year	Title
1985	Tegeka Isi
1991	Bahizi Beza
2003	Abaana
2004	Testimony from Rwanda
2014	Rwandan Dream (with Iain Stewart)
2015	Only Love
2016	Voices from Rwanda

=== Singles ===
- Suzuki (1983 with Nyampinga

Band)

- Nyaruguru
- Ingendo Y'Abeza (1984 with Nyampinga Band)
- Mr. Bigirumwami (1986 with Ingeli Band)
- Rwanda Rwiza (1987)
- Twararutashye (1993 with Ingeli Band)
- Kenyera Inkindi Y'Ubuzima (1995)
- Mutima W'Urugo (1996)
- Ubaha Ikiremwa Muntu (1997)
- Ubuphura Buba Munda (1997)
- Igihe Kirageze (1999)
- Disi Garuka (2000)
