= Butera Knowless =

Rwandan singer (born 1991)

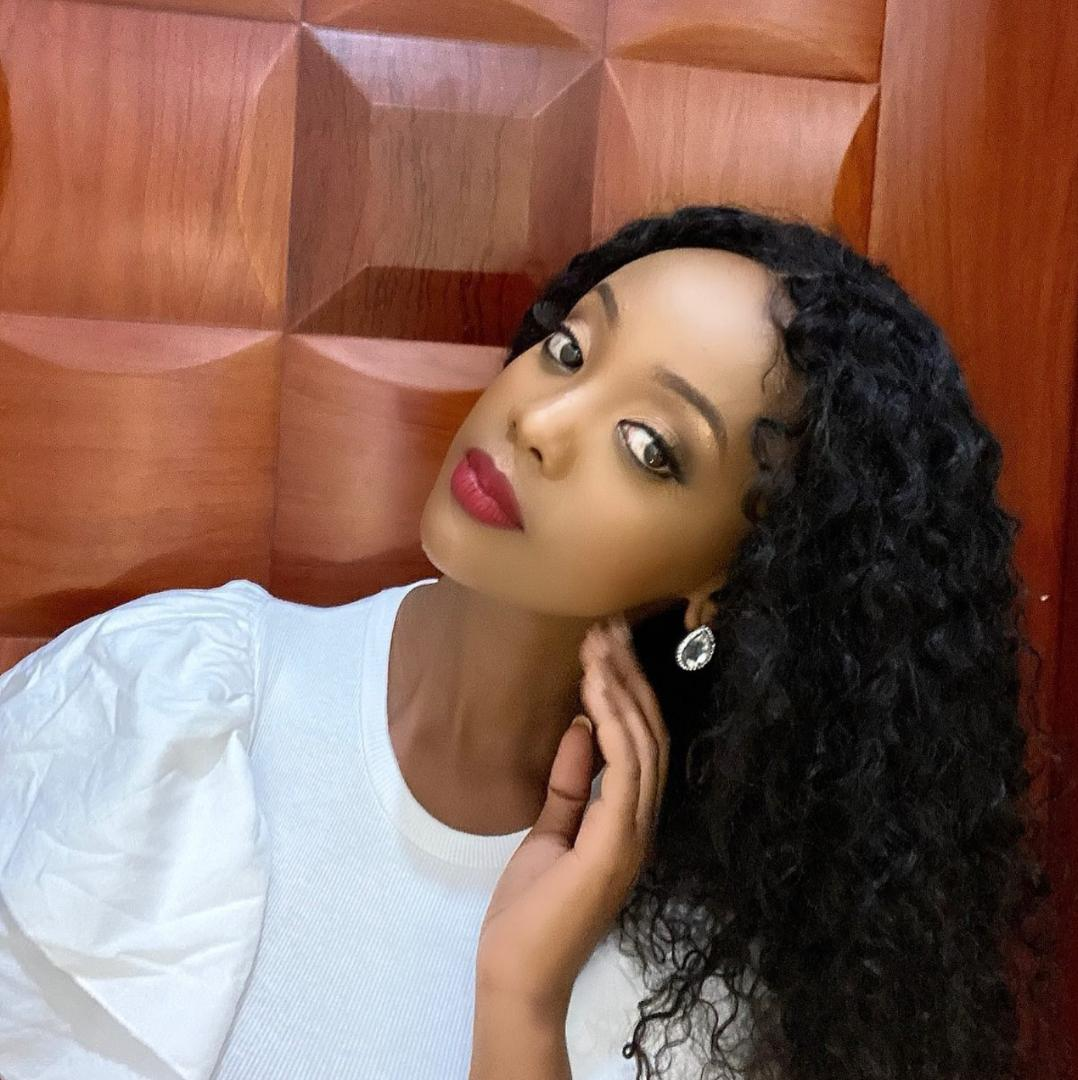
- Image of Butera Knowless

Background information
- Born: Jeanne d’Arc Ingabire Butera; Ruhango
- Origin: Rwanda
- Genres: R&B; Afrobeats
- Occupation: Singer
- Instrument: Vocals
- Years active: 2011–present
- Label: Kina Music
- Website: www.instagram.com/buteraknowless

Knowless (born Jeanne d’Arc Ingabire Butera) is a Rwandan singer and a winner of Primus Guma Guma Super Star seasons 5 (PGGSS). Butera writes many of her own songs. Her songs touch on such themes as romantic relationships, societal issues and daily life.

== History ==
=== Early years and background ===
Jeanne d’Arc Ingabire Butera was born in Ruhango District, the only child of Jean-Marie Vianney Butera and Marie Claire Uyambaje, who are both deceased. Her mother was the lead singer in a local Seventh-day Adventist church choir. Butera attended ESCAF primary school in Nyamirambo, APARUDE secondary school in Ruhango and APACE secondary school in Kigali with a focus on computer sciences and management. As a teenager she sang in the local choir. In 2012 she began to pursue a university degree at Kigali Institute of Science and Technology. In 2019, she graduated with an MBA at the Oklahoma Christian University.

She is married to Ishimwe Clement and is a mother of two girls named Or and Inzora Butera.

=== Musical career ===
Knowless released her debut album, Komeza, in December 2011. Her second album, Uwo Ndiwe, was released in March 2013. Knowless is managed under the label Kina Music.

She has performed throughout Rwanda and in neighboring countries, including Uganda, and has collaborated with Rwandans Danny, Mc Tino, Paccy, Ciney, Jay Polly, Kamichi and Urban Boyz, and the Ugandan group Vampos. She has named Belgium-based Rwandan musician Cecile Kayirebwa and American R&B singer-songwriter Brandy Norwood as her inspirations. In 2021 she released an album called Inzora.

=== Private life ===
Her husband is Clement and they have two daughters.

== Awards ==
Knowless won "Best New Artiste" in the 2010 Salax Awards competition. In August 2013, she took third place in the annual Primus Guma Guma Super Star talent competition, held at Amahoro Stadium. In March 2013 she won her second Salax Award, this time in the category of "Best Female Artist".

In 2013, Knowless was one of three Rwandan acts to perform at the "Rwanda Day" event held in London. In 2015, Knowless Butera won the Primus Gumma Gumma Superstar 5th Edition, and she is the first woman to win such a competition.
