= Meddy =

- Industry: Internet, Digital Health
- Founded: 2015
- Founder: Haris Aghadi, Abdulla Alkhenji, Maahd Shahzad, Ali Naqi
- Successor: HeliumDoc
- Headquarters: Doha, Qatar
- Area served: Qatar, UAE
- Products: Online doctor bookings
- Website: www.meddy.com

Meddy is a GCC-based doctor appointment booking service. Similar to ZocDoc and Practo, Meddy allow users to search for medical care facilities in their region and book appointments. The service was initially launched in Qatar and currently operates in Qatar and UAE.

Meddy was founded by Haris Aghadi, Abdulla Alkhenji, Maahd Shahzad and Ali Naqi in 2015 and is a Silicon Valley 500 Global (previously 500 Startups) portfolio company.

== Services ==
The platform allows patients to find and book doctors based on reviews, location, insurance and specialization. The service may be used as Android, iOS, or web application. The company charges clinics to use their booking software and a booking fee for online appointments.

The platform provides clinic management software to assist doctor's with calendars, billing and CRM.
