= Ikinimba =

Northern Rwanda dance

Ikinimba is a northern Rwanda dance, typically performed by young people are part of a courtship ritual. Songs that accompany the dance often advise unmarried women how to behave towards her prospective in-laws; women do not perform the dance once they are married.
