= Isombe =

Popular stew in Rwanda

Isombe is a vegetable stew dish from Rwanda. It is believed to have originated in the Democratic Republic of the Congo. Vegetables grown in Rwanda are used to prepare isombe, with cassava leaves being the primary ingredient. Peanut butter is usually added to the stew. Other ingredients include tomatoes, onions, coriander, and garlic. Stock from meat bones are also used as an ingredient. The leaves are chopped and boiled with the other ingredients. Peanut butter is added last. It is usually eaten with some type of ugali, rice and beans or bread. Isombe is also eaten in Burundi.

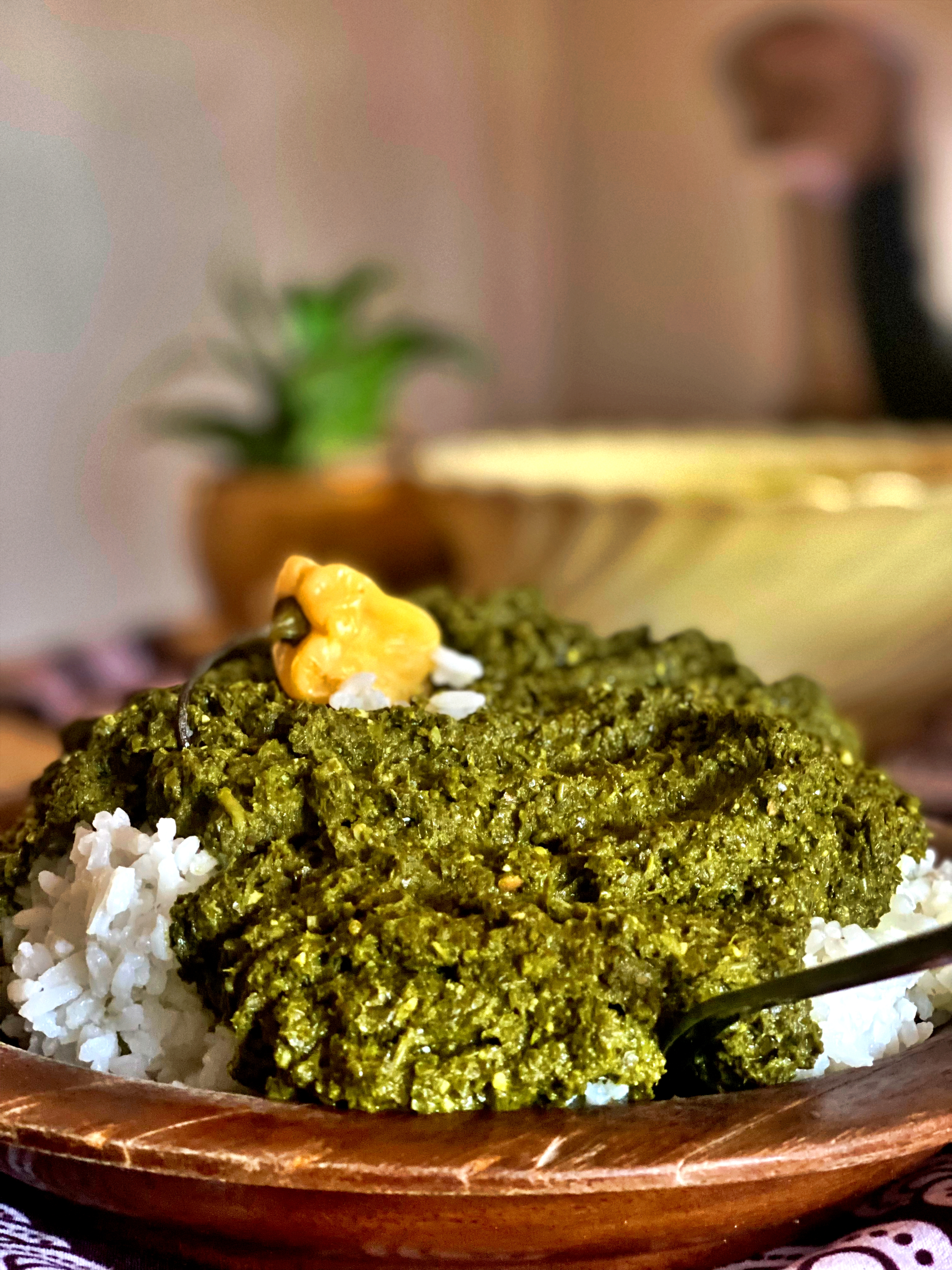
Isombe on rice
