= Bwiza =

Rwandan singer and songwriter

- Born: Bwiza Emerance; August 9, 1999 (age 26); Muhanga District, Rwanda
- Genres: Afro beat

Bwiza Emerance (born 9 August 1999), commonly known as Bwiza, is a Rwandan singer, songwriter and performer signed by Kikac Music Label. She has performed at the Choice Awards and Trace Awards.

== Early life ==
Bwiza Emerance was born in Muhanga District in Rwanda, the firstborn in a family of four children. She lives with her parent in Nyamata located in the bugesera District. Her family later moved to kigali before eventually settling in nyamata. Bwiza attended primary school at kigali harvest and completed her secondary education at St. Joseph's High School and briefly continued her studies at St. Bernadette in Gisagara District. She graduated from St. Aloysius High School in Rwamagana.

In 2020, she began a degree in hospitality and tourism management at Mount Kenya University.

== Music career ==
From a young age, Bwiza developed a passion for music which was fostered by attending church with her parents and enjoying the music performed there. As she grew older, she joined various choirs, including children's choirs. She started singing in the choir at the age of eight and has since become an integral member of the choir at her church, which was initially based in Kigali before moving to Nyamata. Bwiza is passionate about advancing female representation and gender equality in the Rwandan music industry. She is currently collaborating on a song with another renowned Rwandan artist, Uwineza Josiane, also known as Miss Jojo the ben, mico, danny vumbi, and also bwiza attended different concert in Rwanda and abroad. After more than ten years of stepping away from music, Miss Jojo is making a comeback, and their collaboration will be featured on an album set to release in September 2023. Bwiza is also organizing a concert in her hometown of Bugesera, as part of the promotional activities for the album, which will include songs that reflect her love for music and life.

== Releases ==
=== Albums ===
- My Dream
- 25 Shades (2025)

=== Songs ===
- ahazaza
- warubizi
- yiwe
- no bady
- wibeshya
- excgange
- Rudasumbwa
- soja
- iyo twicaranye
