= Cécile Kayirebwa =

Rwandan singer (born 1946)

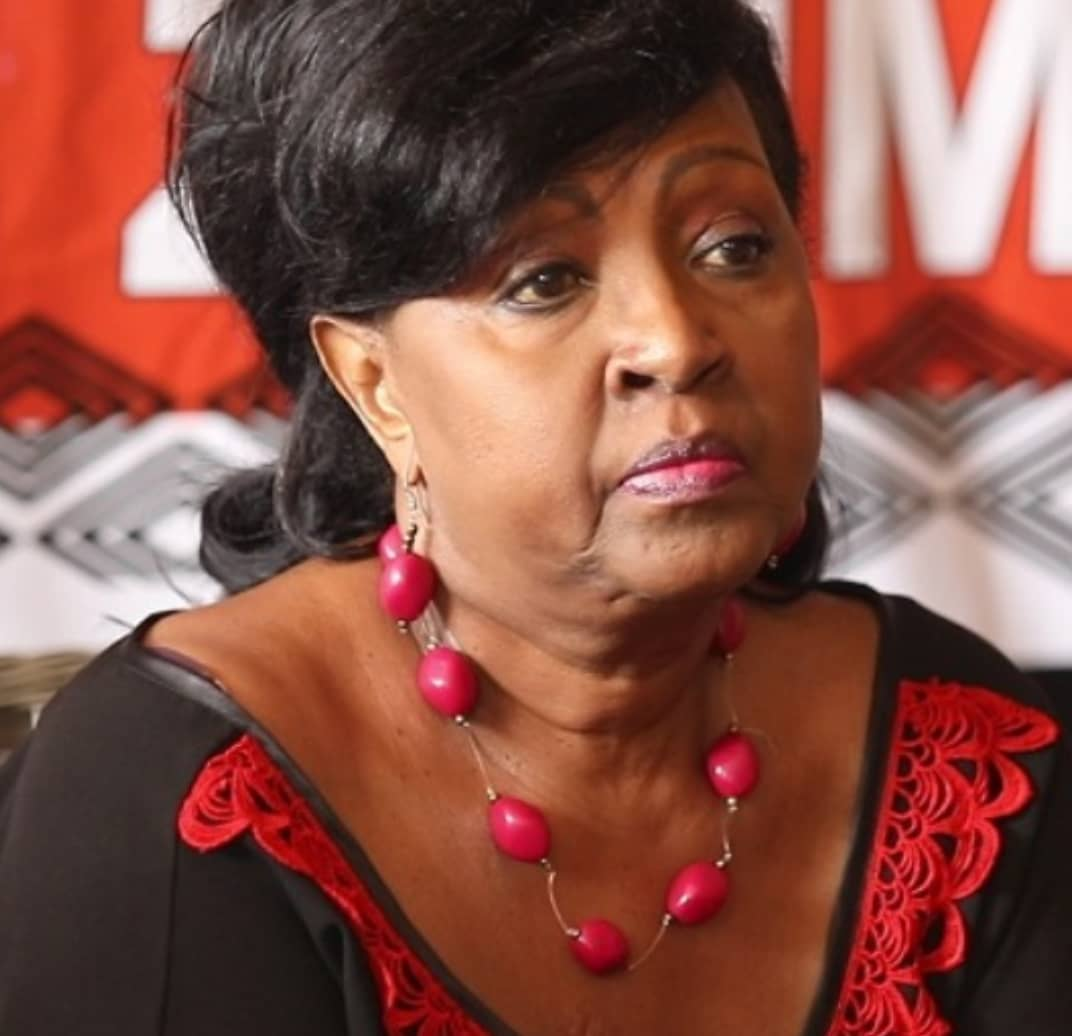
- Cecile Kayirebwa
- Born: 22 October 1946 (age 79); Kigali
- Known for: singing about Rwanda
- Children: four

Cécile Kayirebwa (born 22 October 1946) is a Rwandan singer. She brought her family up in Belgium, but she has toured and published albums. She is known for singing about Rwanda. She sued Rwandan radio stations in 2013 for failing to pay her royalties.

== Life ==
Kayirebwa was born in Kigali in 1946. Both of her parents were enthusiastic singers and she would sing pop songs that she had heard sung by Johnny Hallyday, Stevie Wonder and France Gall. She joined a group who were broadcast by Radio Rwanda whilst she was still a child. She had a happy childhood and she trained to become a welfare officer. Meanwhile her singing developed into composing where she built on her study of traditional Rwandan music. She notably wrote songs in praise of the Rwandan Queen Rosalie who was a benign ruler.

Kayirebwa was invited to sing for her Queen, but in 1973 war broke out in her country and she left with her mother to live in Belgium. They also lived in Lozère, where her mother lived with a French soldier and she became fluent speaking and singing in French. She was a member of a group called Iyange for five years. In Europe she continued to work as a singer to her fellow members of the Rwandan diaspora. She and her husband had four children and she studied her cultural heritage at the Royal Museum for Central Africa in Tervuren. She appeared around Europe and America in the group Bula Sangoma in the mid 1980s and they created an album in 1985.

In 1988 she returned home too late to be reunited with her mother, who died in Rwanda just before she arrived. She sang her song about happiness which was titled "Umunezero" and the song was said to be popular with the Rwandan Patriotic Front. Kayirebwa sang in groups and alone. Her first solo album was titled "Music from Rwanda" and it included songs by Jean-Christophe Matata. She released albums in 2002 and 2005 and she participates in festivals including the Holocaust Memorial Event in London in 2001.

She and Christine Coppel formed a charity called "Hope, the Children of a Thousand Hills" which is concerned with her homeland.

In 2013 Kayirebwa sued Rwandan radio stations including the state broadcaster, Radio Rwanda, as she was frequently heard but she had received no royalties.
