= Kamichi =

Rwandan singer

- Born: Adolphe Bagabo
- Origin: Rwanda
- Genres: Afrobeats, R&B
- Occupation: Singer
- Instrument: Vocals
- Years active: 2009–present

Adolphe Bagabo, commonly known as Kamichi, is a Rwandan musical artist. He is distinguished by his unique and hoarse vocal delivery.

As a child, Bagabo sang in local choirs. The 2009 release of the single "Zoubeda" brought him national popularity and won him a Salax Award in 2010 in the category of "Best Song of the Year". The same year he also won a Salax Award in the category of "Best Afrobeat Artist". He released his second album, Ubumuntu, in 2012. He has collaborated with many Rwandan artists.

As of August 2013, Bagabo is completing studies in Journalism and Communications at the Catholic University of Kabgayi. He worked as a journalist for Voice of Africa (Rwanda)|Voice of Africa in Rwanda.
