= Miss Jojo =

- Born: Josiane Uwineza; 1983 (age 42–43); Bugesera District, Rwanda
- Origin: Rwanda
- Genre: R&B
- Occupation: Singer
- Instrument: Vocals

Miss Jojo Singer

Josiane Uwineza (born 1983), also known as Iman Uwineza and Miss Jojo, is a Rwandan R&B singer. Her music blends R&B and traditional Rwandan musical elements.

== History ==
=== Early years ===
Born in a town in the Bugesera District of Rwanda in 1983, Uwineza enjoyed singing and dancing as a child and her parents encouraged her to develop her talent.

=== Musical career ===
Uwineza launched her singing career after winning the 2007 Rector Excellence Award in the category of "Best Female Artiste" at the National University of Rwanda, where she was completing a Bachelor's Degree in English. Miss Jojo released her debut album, Genesis, the following year.

This was followed by the release of her second album, Woman, in 2012. Her latter album promotes the theme of female empowerment, a cause that the singer champions both on and off the stage. She also uses her lyrics to raise youth awareness of the dangers of drug abuse and HIV/AIDS and encourage Rwandans to participate in national development efforts and make wise choices for their future. She is very active in promoting humanitarian causes. Uwineza has been on a break from her music career since 2012.

== Personal life ==
In 2007 she publicly converted to Islam and changed her name from Josiane to Iman. This change attracted the attention of media reporters who speculated the singer had converted to please her then-boyfriend and producer, an allegation that Uwineza denies.

== Awards ==
- 2011: Best Female artist (salax)
- 2010: Best Female artist (salax)
- 2010: Best female artist (ijoro ry'urukundo)
- 2010: Song of the year Siwezi Enda (ijoro ry'urukundo)
- 2009: Pam award (Pearl of Africa Music Award) Best Rwandan female artist
- 2009: Best female artist (salax)
- 2008: Pam award (Pearl of Africa Music Award) Best Rwandan female artist
- 2007: Best Female Artiste (Rector excellence award)
