= Primus Guma Guma Super Star =

Music Competition

- Created by: East African Promoters and Bralirwa Primus Lager
- Country of origin: Rwanda
- Original languages: Kinyarwanda; English
- No. of seasons: 6

Original release
- Network: RTV
- Release: 2011 – present

Primus Guma Guma Super Star (aka PGGSS) is an annual Rwandan reality singing competition show. PGGSS is sponsored by Bralirwa's Primus lager and was created by East African Promoters (EAP) to help grow music entertainment in Rwanda. Unlike East Africa's Tusker Project Fame and American Idol where the competitors are unknown talent, Primus Guma Guma Super Star takes known Rwandan artists (like Tom Close, Bruce Melodie, King James, Riderman, and Dream Boys) and has them compete against each another in hopes of winning cash to promote their music career to new heights.

The 3rd season, which took place in 2013, was bigger than the previous 2 seasons and the journalists and show biz analysts billed Bralirwa's Primus Guma Guma Super Star the biggest and most-intense music contest in Rwanda.

== Controversy ==
In 2013, the media accused East African Promoters and Bralirwa, the two main organizers of Primus Guma Guma Super Star, for a massive rigging of the 2013 PGGSS season in favour of the current winner, Riderman (rapper).

== Past winners ==
Season	Year	Winner
Season One	2011	Tom Close
Season Two	2012	King James (singer)king james
Season Three	2013	Riderman
Season Four	2014	Jay Polly
Season Five	2015	Butera Knowless
Season Six	2016	Urban Boyz
Season Seven	2017	Dream Boys
Season Eight	2018	Bruce Melodie
