= Tom Close =

Rwandan-based musician

- Born: Thomas Muyombo; October 28, 1984 (age 41); Uganda
- Genres: R&B, Afrobeat, dancehall
- Occupations: Singer, physician
- Instrument: Vocals
- Years active: 2005–present
- Label: Kina Music
- Formerly of: Afro-Saints
- Website: instagram.com/tomclose/

Thomas Muyombo (born 28 October 1984), also known as Tom Close, is a Ugandan-born, Rwandan-based musician, and physician. A ChimpReports reviewer in 2013 described him as "the king of Afrobeat and dancehall" in Rwanda.

== Early life and education ==
Muyombo, the second of three children, was born on 28 October 1984 to Edward Karangwa and Faith Grace Dukuze in the Masindi District of Uganda. After beginning his primary education in Uganda, Muyombo relocated to Rwanda, where he completed his secondary education at Kiziguro secondary school and the French Lycée de Kigali. In fourth grade, he began singing in church choirs.

He completed a university degree in Human Medicine at the National University of Rwanda in 2013.

== Career ==
=== Musical career ===
As a musician, Muyombo goes by the name Tom Close.

In 2005, Muyombo formed his first group with four friends under the name Afro-Saints, recording five songs between 2006 and 2007 but without gaining popular success. His first single as a solo artist, "Mbwira", was recorded in November 2007 and was followed by the release of his debut album, Kuki, in May 2008. He recorded four more albums between 2008 and 2013, entitled Subeza, Ntubanyurwa, Komeza Utsinde and Mbabariara Ugaruke.

He has collaborated with numerous Rwandan and international artists, including Professor Jay, Radio and Weasel, General Ozzey, Knowless, and Sean Kingston. He has toured widely in Rwanda and the countries of the East African Community, and performed in the United States in 2011. He performed at a cohas ncert celebrating the tenth anniversary of regional telecommunications company MTN alongside international artist Shaggy.

Muyombo win first annual Primus Guma Guma Super Star famous artists competition, held at Amahoro Stadium in 2011. In 2008, he won Best Artist at a competition hosted by the National University of Rwanda. He also won Artist of the Year at the Salax Awards in 2009, 2010 and 2011.

=== Medical career ===
After graduation, Muyombo joined the pediatrics department of Kacyiru hospital in 2014. In 2015, he joined the blood transfusion service in 2015 and was appointed as the Director of Regional Centre for Blood Transfusion for Kigali in 2019.

He has also worked as doctor at the national police hospital located in Kigali.

== Selected publications ==
- Inka Yanjye (comic, three volumes)
- Nkunda u Rwanda (comic)
- suka Yanjye (comic)

== Personal life ==
Muyombo's mother died in 1996. He is married and had two children.
