= Kitoko Bibarwa =

Rwandan singer

Kitoko
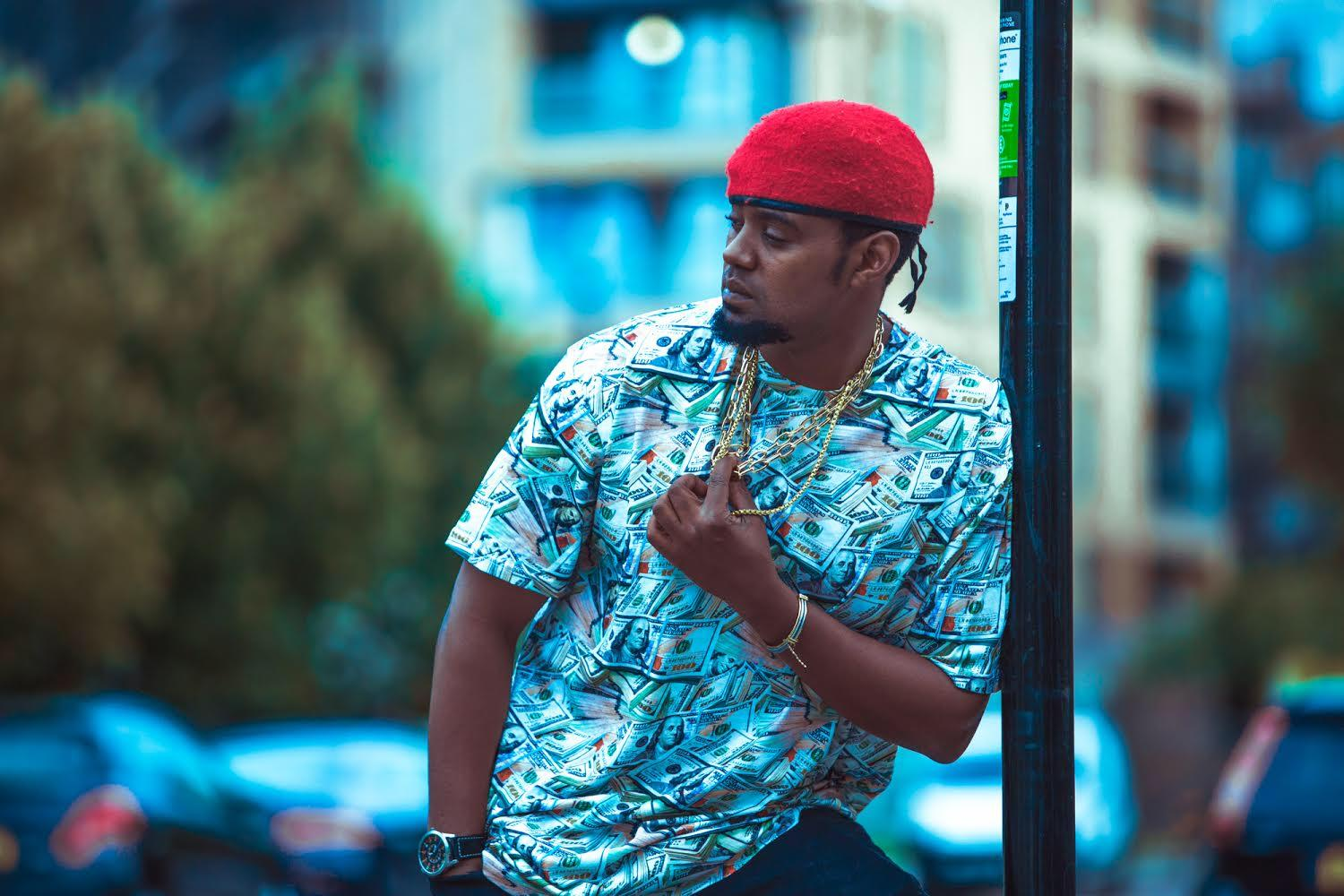

Background information
- Born: Patrick Bibarwa; September 12, 1985 (age 40); Zaire
- Origin: Rwanda
- Genres: Afrobeats, hip hop, R&B
- Occupation: Singer
- Instrument: Vocals
- Years active: 2009-present
- Label: Trill Boys House
- Website: https://www.instagram.com/kitokolife/?hl=en

Kitoko, born Patrick Bibarwa, is a Rwandan singer. He released his debut album, Ifaranga, in January 2010. The album enjoyed immediate and wide success in Rwanda and Uganda. In 2012 a reviewer for Ugandan newspaper The East African called him "the biggest Rwandan artiste at the moment". Prior to launching his musical career, Bibarwa sang in a local church choir.

In 2012, Kitoko was invited to give a private performance at the birthday of Ange Kagame, daughter of Rwandan president Paul Kagame. In February 2013, Kitoko performed at the Rwandan Cultural Festival in Jylland-Fyn, Denmark. He has also performed throughout the East African Community and in the United States, France and Belgium. He was a winner twice at the Salax Awards, including in the category of Best Afrobeat Artiste.

In June 2013, Kitoko announced his retirement from the music industry for unknown reasons.

== Discography ==
=== Albums ===
Kitoko Bibarwa

=== Songs ===
Kitoko songs
2007	"Manyobwa"
2008	"Igendere"
2010	"Ikiragi"
2012	"akabuto"
2015	"Rurashonga"
2015	"Sibyo"
2015	"Urankunda Bikandenga"
2018	"Rurabo"
2019	"wenema"
2024	"Tiro"
