= Bruce Melodie =

Rwandan singer

- Born: Itahiwacu Bruce; 3 March 1992 (age 34); Rwanda
- Genres: R&B, AfroPop, Afro beat, jazz
- Occupations: Singer, songwriter, music executive, actor
- Instrument: Vocals
- Years active: 2011–present
- Partner: Catherine Umuhoza
- Website: instagram.com/brucemelodie

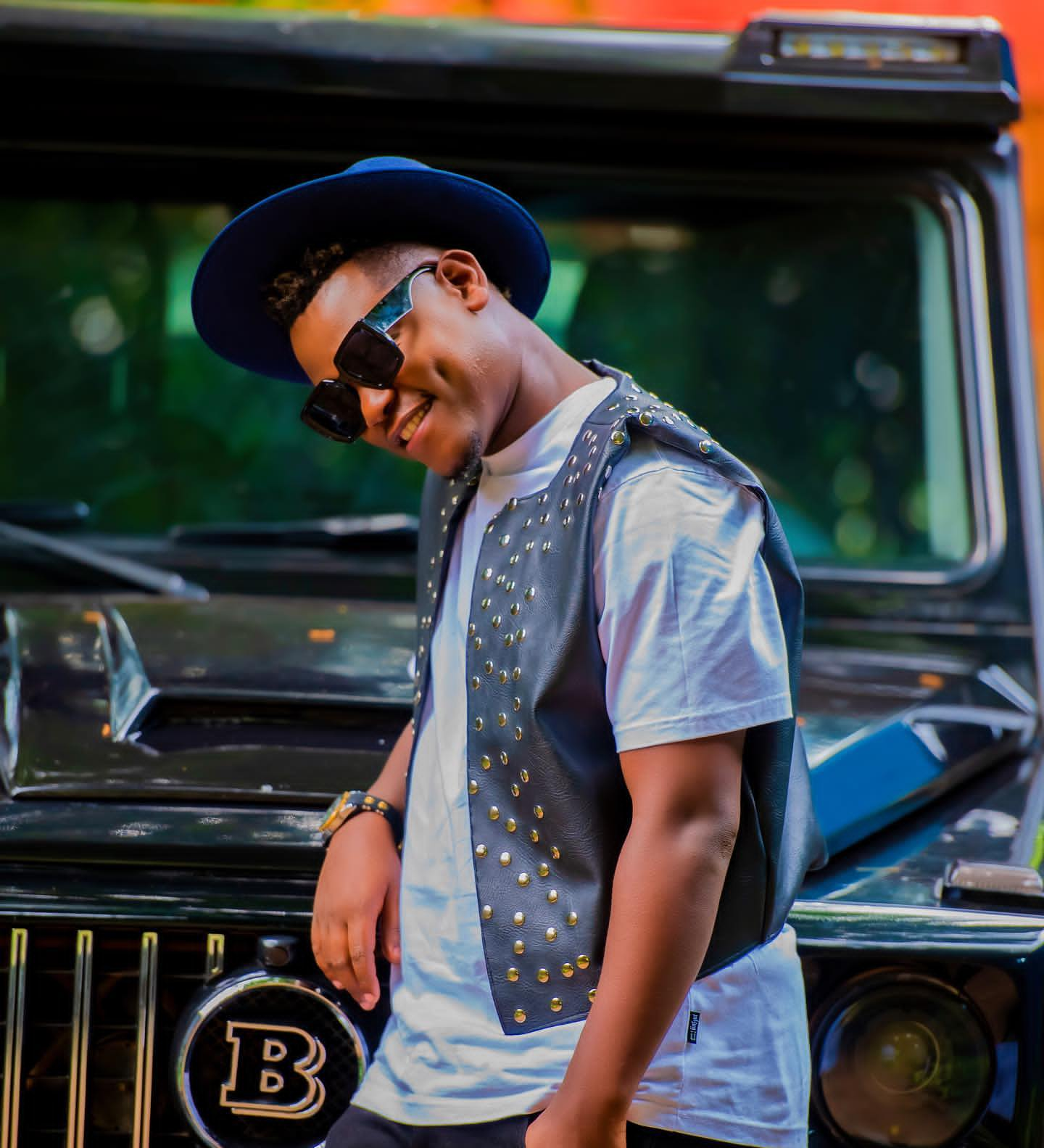
Bruce Melodie, Rwandan Recording Artist

Itahiwacu Bruce (born 3 March 1992), commonly known as Bruce Melodie aka Munyakazi, is a Rwandan singer and a winner of Primus Guma Guma Super Star seasons 8 (PGGSS).

He is the Founder of Igitangaza Music record Label. Bruce is also a brand ambassador of BK Arena and Primus. He does his music under 1:55 AM label which was led by Coach Gael. In October 2023 Bruce melody released a single "When she is around" featuring Jamaican international hit maker "Shaggy" also he release out hit of hit album called Colorful Generation.

== History ==
=== Early years ===
Bruce Itahiwacu was born in Kicukiro District. He is the second born in a family of four by "Gervain Ntibihangana (father) and Velene Muteteri (deceased in 2013). Bruce attended Camp Kanombe primary school in Kanombe, Rwamagana Islamic secondary school.

=== Musical career ===
Bruce is considered a Current Rwanda Musician Leader. He started singing at an early age in a church choir and released his debut song "Tubivemo" under the album called, Ndumiwe, in August 2013. His second album, Ntundize, was released in 2014. At that time, Bruce was managed under the "Super Level Music Label". In February 2021, Bruce announced that he had signed with Cloud9 Entertainment to manage his music career, but in 2022 he terminated the contract with Lee and joined new management, 1:55AM Entertainment, headed by Gael Karomba AKA Coach Gael.

==== Studio albums ====
List of studio albums with selected details
Title	Details
Ndumiwe	Released: 13 August 2014; Label: Bruce Melodie; Formats: Digital download
Ntundize	Released: 2014; Label: Super Level Music Label; Formats: Digital download
Colorful Generation	•Released: 2025; •Label: 1:55AM; •Formats: Digital download

He has performed throughout Rwanda and in neighboring countries, including Uganda and has collaborated with numerous artists, including Urban Boyz, Queen Cha, Jay-C, Sheebah Karungi, Pallaso, B2C, Fik fameica and Khaligraph Jones. He named Craig David as his inspiration. He was the first Rwandan artist to perform at Coke Studio (Africa)|Coke Studio Africa. .In 2020 Bruce melodie raised Kenny Sol and Juno kizigenza. In 2023 he got featured in Harmonize's song called "Zanzibar" and performed it together in the front of thousands at the trace awards in Zanzibar . In 2025 he got featured in Joeboy's song called Beauty on Fire feat and became.

== Awards ==
Year	Award	Category	Nominee(s)	Result	Ref
2014	Salax Awards	Best RnB Artist	Bruce Melodie	Won	
2016	Salax Awards	Best Male Artist	Bruce Melodie	Won	
2017	HiPipo Awards	Song of the Year (Rwanda)	Turaberanye	Nominated	
2018	Salax Awards	Best Artist	Bruce Melodie	Won	
2018	PGGS8	Best Artist	Bruce Melodie	Won	
2019	Salax Awards	Best R & B Artist	Bruce Melodie	Won	
2019	Salax Awards	Best male artist	Bruce Melodie	Won	
2019	Kiss Summer Awards	Best Summer Artist	Bruce Melodie	Won	
2019	HiPipo Awards	Song of the Year (Rwanda)	Embeera zo	Nominated	
2019	HiPipo Awards	Video of the Year (Rwanda)	Blocka	Won	
2021	The Choice Awards	Artist of the Year	Bruce Melodie	Won	
2021	Kiss Summer Award 2021	Best Summer Artist	Bruce Melodie	Won	
2023	Trace Awards	Best Rwandan Artist	Bruce Melodie	Won	

== Net worth ==
Bruce Melodie, in 2021, was preferred as one of Rwandan artists with financial stability. Bruce Melodie and his group launched a TV Station ISIBO TV (2020) He also signed the greatest endorsement deal with BROK Company of 50 millions RWF He has worked with local telecommunication companies (MTN, Airtel) through advertisement and has signed with Infinix mobility as its ambassador. He also signed a contract with TECNO mobile in 2021. He signed new contract with Kigali Arena which was valued at 150 millions of Rwandan francs and in 2021 he became a billionaire in Rwandan Francs by signing a contract of US$1 million $ with Food Bundles. He is among top 20 musicians from East Africa on the list of millionaires in USD.

According to Kigali Daily News his Net Worth Estimated at $6 million

Funga macho
- https://players.brightcove.net/296474766/rJNVvNCfe_default/index.html?videoId=6349322443112
