= Urban Boyz =

Rwandan R&B Afropop Duo

- Origin: Rwanda
- Genres: R&B, Afropop
- Years active: 2008-2018
- Labels: The Hub Entertainment
- Members: James Manzi (Humble Jizzo); Muhammed Nshimiyimana (Nizzo Kaboss)
- Past members: Safi Madiba

Urban Boyz is a Rwandan R&B Afropop Duo composed of 2 members James Manzi (Humble Jizzo) and Muhammed Nshimiyimana (Nizzo Kaboss). A reviewer for the Rwandan newspaper New Times described them in 2013 as "the country's leading music group."

== History ==
Urban Boyz released their debut album, Icyicaro Today, in 2008 and have since released more than 70 singles and three studio albums. They have collaborated with numerous regional artists, including Rwandans Riderman, Mico The Best, Riderman and King James and Ugandans Jackie Chandiru, Rabadaba and Goodlyfe crew of Radio and Weasel. The group performs songs written in English, Kiswahili and Kinyarwanda.

== Awards ==
Urban Boyz took second place in the annual Primus Guma Guma Super Star talent competition, held at Amahoro Stadium in August 2013. Their single, Bibaye, was voted song of the year. In March 2013, Urban Boyz won four Salax Awards in the categories Artiste of the Year, Best Male Artiste, Best Group and Best Video.
