= Souzy Kasseya =

Congolese musician (born 1949)

- Also known as: Souzy Kaseya
- Born: Kaseya Suzy Seyo Souza; 20 April 1949 (age 77); Élisabethville (now Lubumbashi), Katanga, Belgian Congo (now the Democratic Republic of the Congo)
- Genres: Congolese rumba; soukous; mutuashi; soul; funk; rock; pop
- Occupations: Guitarist; singer-songwriter; composer; arranger; multi-instrumentalist
- Instruments: Guitar; vocals
- Years active: 1962–present
- Labels: Papa-Disco; Eska Production; Productions Balafon; WEA West Africa; CBS; Associated Sound Limited; Safari Sound; Tsavo Records; PolyGram Records; Mercury; Earthworks
- Formerly of: Vox Africa; African Team

Kaseya Suzy Seyo Souza (born 20 April 1949), known professionally as Souzy Kasseya, is a Congolese guitarist, singer-songwriter, composer, arranger, and multi-instrumentalist. Often referred to as touche à tout ("jack of all trades"), he is considered one of the leading figures of the mid-1980s Paris-based soukous scene. His music is a blend of Congolese rumba, soukous, and mutuashi with elements of soul, funk, rock, and pop.

Born in Lubumbashi, Kasseya began his career at the age of 13, and in 1967 he relocated to Kinshasa to become the lead guitarist for the band Vox Africa, which caught the attention of Le Grand Kallé, who subsequently invited him to join the Paris-based revival of African Team. He commenced his solo career in 1973 and gained national fame in 1975 with the politically charged song "Yoka maloba ya Mobutu". After moving to Brussels in 1978, he studied musical arrangement at the Royal Conservatory of Brussels and earned a diploma in musical techniques. His debut solo album, Africa Now, was released in 1980, followed by Mami-Wata in 1982, and his third album, Le Retour De L'As (1983), achieved international success, with the lead single "Le Téléphone sonne", selling over 700,000 copies and charting in multiple European countries. In 1985 he broke into the UK market with The Phenomenal Souzy Kasseya on the Earthworks label.

Over his career, Kasseya has worked with several artists, including Tshala Muana, Pépé Kallé, Bébé Manga, François Lougah, Uta Bella, Grace Jones, Édith Lefel, Papa Wemba, Evoloko Jocker, Madilu System, Mbilia Bel, Koffi Olomide, Werrason, Fally Ipupa, and Ferre Gola.

== Life and career ==
=== 1949–1972: Early life, Vox Africa and African Team ===
Kaseya Suzy Seyo Souza was born on 20 April 1949, in Élisabethville (present-day Lubumbashi), Katanga Province, in what was then the Belgian Congo (later the Republic of the Congo, subsequently Zaire, and now the Democratic Republic of the Congo). Kaseya began his career at a young age as a session musician, collaborating with various bands of his choice. Beginning in 1962, at the age of thirteen, he performed with bands in Stanleyville (now Kisangani), Lubumbashi, and Lusaka, alongside compatriot Bovick Shamar (guitar, vocals) and the Angolan musician Mário Matadidi Mabele, also known as Mário "Buana Kitoko" ("handsome boy" in Lingala). Mário would later co-found, in 1972, the band Trio Madjesi with Loko Masengo (later of Kékélé) and Bonghat Sinuku Tshekabu Maximilien, known as Saak Saakul "Sinatra". The band's name derived from the initials of its three founders: "Ma" (Mário), "Dje" (Djeskain), and "Si" (Sinatra).

In 1967, Kaseya moved to Kinshasa, where, performing under the name Seyo Souza, he joined Vox Africa Orchestra as lead guitarist, replacing Antoine Nedule Monswet (known as Papa Noël). This marked the beginning of his rise within the influential band, founded in 1960 by Jeannot Bombenga and Franklin Boukaka. Vox Africa served as a training ground for many major Congolese musicians, including Sam Mangwana (1967), Ntesa Dalienst (1967–1968), Marcel Loko Masengo (until 1970), and Papa Noël (until 1968). It was also during his time with Vox Africa that Joseph Athanase Tshamala Kabasele (known as Le Grand Kallé) noticed Kaseya and invited him to participate in the revival of African Team, a short-lived Paris-based band formed in 1969. The band featured Jean Serge Essous, Manu Dibango, Joseph Mulamba Mujos, Don Gonzalo, Edo Clary Lutula, and Jean Munsi Kwamy, among others.

== Solo career ==
=== 1973–1982: Solo breakthrough, European relocation, Africa Now, and collaborations ===
Kaseya embarked on his solo career in 1973, and in 1975, he gained national recognition for composing the politically charged song "Yoka maloba ya Mobutu" ("Listen to Mobutu's Words"). He relocated to Paris in 1977 and, according to music journalist Jeannot Ne Nzau Diop, settled permanently in Europe the following year. He studied for two years at the Royal Conservatory of Brussels, specializing in musical arrangement and earning a diploma in musical techniques. During this time, he also developed an interest in computer-assisted music (musique assistée par l'ordinateur; MAO).

While based in Paris, Kaseya joined forces with Assi Kapela, Bopol Mansiamina, and Empompo Loway to work with M'pongo Love and her band Tsheke Tsheke Love. There, he met Tshala Muana, who was then a dancer and backing vocalist. He composed and arranged several of M'pongo Love's songs, including "Rebe", "Destinée", "Ah Mony", and "Yoko". At the same time, he collaborated with Sam Mangwana, who supported the production of his 1980 debut solo album, Africa Now. The album blended Congolese rumba, mutuashi, soul, funk, and pop influences and featured musicians Aladji Touré (bass), Jimmy Mvondo Mvele (guitar), Jules Kamga (guitar), Ben's Belinga (saxophone), and Jerry Manga (trumpet). Produced by Productions Balafon and distributed by WEA West Africa (Warner–Elektra–Atlantic), Africa Now was described by Jeannot Ne Nzau Diop as showcasing Kaseya's "distinctive personal style and passion for musical exploration". That same year, he represented Zaire at a major African music festival, which led to a continental tour that eventually brought him to Abidjan, where he promoted Africa Now and examined the evolution of Zairean music in West Africa, where many of his contemporaries had relocated. Although Africa Now fell short of commercial expectations, it proved to be his pursuit of cross-genre experimentation.

In Abidjan, Kaseya collaborated with fellow Congolese musicians Lokassa Ya M'Bongo, Nyboma Mwan'dido (later of Kékélé), Théo Blaise Kounkou, and Ange Lino, which these collaborations contributing to the revitalization of soukous. He later recorded his second studio album, Mami-Wata, in Lomé, which was released in 1982 by Papa-Disco in the Ivory Coast. He reunited with Tshala Muana in Lomé, and the two decided to collaborate. Kaseya composed and arranged several of her early songs, including "Amina", "Ndeka ya Samuel", and "Koumba".

=== 1983–present: Le Retour De L'As, collaborations and releases ===
In 1983, he produced his third studio album, Le Retour De L'As, in Paris under Eska Production, which he also managed. The album featured Rigo Star (rhythm guitar), Domingo Salsero (drums), Léa Lignanzi and Baba Bhy-Gao (vocals), Prosper N'Kouri (percussion), Kinzonzi André du Soleil (bass), and horn players Fredo Tete and Jimmy Mvondo Mvele. The album's lead single, "Le Téléphone sonne", a fusion of mutuashi, Congolese rumba, soukous, soul, funk, and pop, stood out for its percussion and intricate guitar lines. The song became a major hit in France and Central Africa, selling over 700,000 copies, earning gold certification, and reportedly topping European charts, surpassing even Bob Marley in sales at the time. Although its UK release on Earthworks Records achieved less success, the song propelled Kaseya into a European tour that included France, the Netherlands, England, Germany, Italy, and Spain.

In 1985, Kaseya broke into the UK market with The Phenomenal Souzy Kasseya, released on Earthworks and featuring Jean Papy's vocals. The Phenomenal Souzy Kasseya was a "firmly roots-based soukous set which successfully added hi-tech electronic effects and instrumentation to the mix". That year, he also lent his guitar, voice, and songwriting to the charity single "Starvation/Tam Tam Pour L'Ethiopie". During the latter half of the 1980s, he became a sought-after session guitarist in Paris studios. In 1989, Kaseya collaborated with Evoloko Jocker on the album Mbonge Mbonge, and in 1992, he co-arranged Koffi Olomide's acclaimed album Haut de Gamme – Koweït, Rive Gauche, alongside Maïka Munan and Philippe Guez.

During the Second Congo War in 1998, Kaseya composed the patriotic song "Tokufa po na Congo" ("Let's Die for Congo"), which united about twenty Congolese artists in protest against the conflict. The song became a symbolic anthem calling for national unity and resistance. In 2000, amid the National Debate, he composed another song urging Congolese leaders to guide the country out of political crisis. Around this period, he signed a contract with Bralima and the RG Agency of Riva Kalimasi and Georges Ngalula, arranging commercial jingles for the brewery's brands, including "Pelisa Ngwasuma" and "Kindingou". With Mbilia Bel, Kaseya arranged, played guitar, programmed drums, and provided backing vocals on her albums Welcome (2001) and Bellissimo (2004).

On 13 February 2026, he composed "Franc Congolais Nkolo Mabele", a patriotic Congolese rumba promoting the Congolese franc over foreign currencies, which brought together more than ten artists such as Koffi Olomide, Werrason, JB Mpiana, Lokua Kanza, Ferré Gola, Fally Ipupa, Héritier Watanabe, Félix Wazekwa, Karmapa, Fabregas Le Métis Noir, Gally Garvey, Cindy Le Coeur, Yannick Ntumba, Céline Banza, Reddy Amisi, Mbilia Bel, Manda Chante, Icone Ranza, Jossart N'Yoka Longo, Evoloko Jocker, Ibrator Mpiana, But Na Filet, Jean Goubald Kalala, Djo Kizi, RJ Kanierra, Gaz Mawete, Kadiyoyo, and Kadno. Richard Ntumba of the Congolese French-language digital outlet Ouragan.cd noted that through their performance, the artists credited the appreciation of the Congolese franc to the Central Bank of the Congo's sustained efforts to reinforce monetary discipline and better manage foreign exchange reserves. Kaseya emphasized that the currency had long suffered repeated fluctuations and declines, which led many to believe that improvement was impossible.

== Legacy ==
Kaseya's work played a key role in bringing soukous to prominence during the 1980s. AllMusic describes him as one of the "leading light of the mid-80s, Paris-based soukous scene", noting that his album Le Retour De L'As, driven by the hit "Le Téléphone sonne", became a massive success in France and throughout Central Africa. He is also listed among the founders of the Ngwomo Africa, a Pan-African music prize launched in Kinshasa in 1994 by François Londala Bongwalanga, head of Laudert Production.

Congolese music journalist Jeannot Ne Nzau Diop described Kaseya as "an attentive and engaged observer of the ongoing evolution of modern Congolese music". His long-running collaboration with Tshala Muana, hailed as the "queen of mutuashi", a Luba traditional musical style, established him as "one of the pioneers of ethnomusicological research in Congo".

Throughout his career, Kaseya has collaborated with numerous artists, including Tshala Muana, Pépé Kallé, Bébé Manga, François Lougah, Uta Bella, Grace Jones, Édith Lefel, Papa Wemba, Evoloko Jocker, Madilu System, Mbilia Bel, Koffi Olomide, Werrason, Fally Ipupa, and Ferre Gola. With Tshala Muana, he arranged nearly a dozen albums since 1986. In 1989, he worked with Evoloko Jocker on the album Mbonge Mbonge, and in 1992 co-arranged Koffi Olomide's acclaimed Haut de Gamme – Koweït, Rive Gauche with Maïka Munan and Philippe Guez. His later collaborations with Mbilia Bel included arranging, guitar, drum programming, and backing vocals on Welcome (2001) and Bellissimo (2004).

== Discography ==
Selected discography
Title	Year	Label	Remarks
Africa Now	1980	Produced by – Productions Balafon; Distributed by – WEA West Africa	LP
Mami-Wata	1982	Distributed by Papa-Disco	LP
Le Retour De L'As	1983	Eska Production; Distributed by – Afro-Rythmes	LP
Le Téléphone sonne	1983	Record company – Phonogram; Phonographic copyright – Eska Production	Maxi-single
Le Téléphone sonne	1983	CBS	Maxi-single
"Princesse Ogoyo"	1983	Associated Sound Limited	Single
Le Phénomènal	1984	Eska International	LP
The Phenomenal Souzy Kasseya	1985	Earthworks	LP
La Vie Continue	1985	Producer: Jean-Marie Salaun	Maxi-single
Le Telephone Sonne	1985	Makossa	Maxi-single
"Uta Mbuta"	1987	Tsavo Records and Polygram Records	Single
