= Pépé Kallé =

Congolese singer-songwriter (1951–1998)

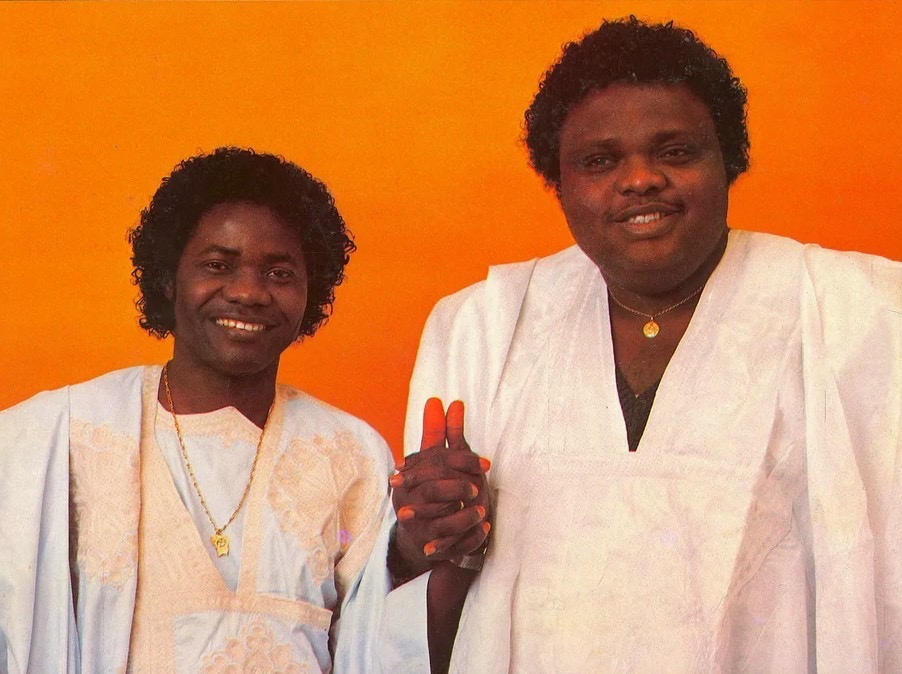
- Pépé Kallé (right) and Nyboma in 1986

Background information
- Born: Jean-Baptiste Kabasele Yampanya wa ba Mulanga; 30 November 1951; Léopoldville, Belgian Congo (present-day Kinshasa, DR Congo)
- Died: 29 November 1998 (aged 46) Kinshasa, Democratic Republic of the Congo
- Genres: Congolese rumba; soukous
- Occupations: Singer-songwriter; bandleader; performer
- Instrument: Vocals
- Years active: 1966–1998
- Labels: Éditions Vévé International; Syllart Records; Mélodie Distribution; Alia Music; Leader Records; Kagi; Afro-Rythmes; SonoDisc; Babi Production International; Ndiaye
- Formerly of: African Choc; Orchestre Bamboula; Orchestre Myosotis; Orchestre Bella Bella; Orchestre Vévé; Lipua Lipua; Empire Bakuba

Jean-Baptiste Kabasele Yampanya wa ba Mulanga (30 November 1951 – 29 November 1998), known professionally as Pépé Kallé, was a Congolese singer-songwriter, bandleader, and performer. Noted for his robust, throaty baritone voice, he was a significant figure in the evolution of soukous and was referred to by various nicknames, among them the "elephant of Zaire music", "La Bombe Atomique", and "the elephant of African music". Before entering the music industry professionally, he composed songs that he sold to various bands to finance his education while also participating in the group African Choc, alongside Papy Tex. His early recordings also brought him into contact with influential veterans such as Le Grand Kallé, whose work played an important role in shaping Congolese rumba and influenced Pépé Kallé's musical direction.

Pépé Kallé's first breakthrough came in the late 1960s, when he joined Orchestre Bamboula under guitarist Papa Noël Nedule. He later performed with several groups in the early 1970s, including Orchestre Myosotis, Bella Bella, and Orchestre Vévé, where he provided lead vocals to Verckys Kiamuangana Mateta's socially conscious hit "Nakomitunaka". In March 1973, he became one of the founding bandleaders of Empire Bakuba, which later emerged as one of the most influential bands in Congolese popular music. Alongside Dilu Dilumona and Papy Tex, he helped develop a style that blended rumba, sebene guitar sections, and theatrical live performances. The band's popularity in Zaire rose sharply after the release of the hits "Dadou" in 1978 and "Zabolo" in 1982. During the mid-1980s, Empire Bakuba signed with Senegalese producer Ibrahima Sylla's Syllart Production, and Pépé Kallé collaborated with fellow Congolese singer-songwriter Nyboma on the albums Zouke Zouke (1986) and Moyibi (1988), which fused soukous with zouk and achieved broad popularity in Francophone Africa and the French Caribbean. In 1987, he made his acting debut in the film La Vie est Belle.

Pépé Kallé was noted for his multi-octave vocal range and large physical stature, standing about 190 centimetres (75 in) tall and weighing over 136 kilograms (300 lb). Music critic Martin Enyimo noted that the contrast between Pépé Kallé's stature and the energetic performances of Empire Bakuba's dwarf dancers made the group especially visually distinctive on stage. Alongside his work with Empire Bakuba, he also pursued a solo career through several records. The 1989 albums Pon Moun Paka Bougé and Cé Chalè Carnaval helped popularize the modern générique, a style centered on long, dance-oriented sebene sections and choreographed performances. He died in Kinshasa on 29 November 1998, after suffering a heart attack.

== Early life and career ==
=== 1951–1971: Childhood, education, and music debut ===
Jean-Baptiste Kabasele Yampanya wa ba Mulanga was born in Léopoldville (present-day Kinshasa) in the Belgian Congo (now the Democratic Republic of the Congo) on 30 November 1951, to "Papa" Angbando and "Maman" Mbula. He was the eldest of 15 children, eight of whom were boys. The city became the capital of the First Congolese Republic after independence on 30 June 1960 and was where Congolese rumba emerged.

Kabasele Yampanya showed his vocal abilities from an early age. His parents, however, were hesitant about his passion for music, as his father hoped he would join the military, while his mother preferred that he pursue a career in public administration. He began singing in his church choir and completed his primary education at Saint Charles Catholic School and Saint Paul School in Barumbu. He later attended Institut Saint Raphaël de Limete and Institut Technique et Social de Ngiri-Ngiri for secondary studies. According to the Ivorian legal information website Loidici.com, founded in 2008 by Dame N'Guessan, Kabasele Yampanya wrote songs and sold them to local bands to finance his schooling. During this period, he sharpened his musical skills and built friendships with fellow aspiring singers from his neighborhood and school, including Nyboma Mwan'dido, Jossart N'yoka Longo, and Papy Tex Matolu. He later gave up his studies in order to pursue music professionally. Alongside Papy Tex, he joined the group African Choc, where they were mentored by Le Grand Kallé of African Jazz, to whom they also submitted compositions, including "Pardon Papi", written by Papy Tex in 1967 and later recorded in the studio. The guitarist Lokassa Ya Mbongo later recalled that Kabasele Yampanya was constantly joking onstage and during recording sessions. Kabasele Yampanya's meeting with Le Grand Kallé had a major influence on his career and inspired him to adopt the professional name "Pépé Kallé", to honor his mentor. The nickname "Pépé", taken from a female friend from his neighborhood, was added to avoid confusion with Le Grand Kallé.

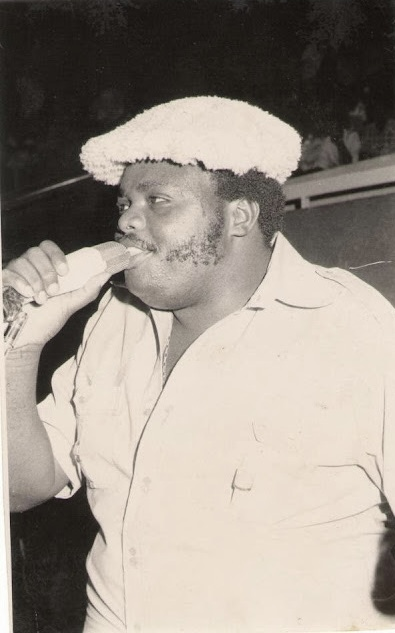
Pépé Kallé in the 1970s

Pépé Kallé's professional career took off in 1969, after he joined Orchestre Bamboula, led by guitarist Papa Noël Nedule, a former member of Rock-a-Mambo and Les Bantous de la Capitale. There, he worked alongside Madilu System and Bozi Boziana. That same year, Orchestre Bamboula represented Congo-Kinshasa at the Pan-African Festival of Algiers, where they shared the stage with Miriam Makeba, Stokely Carmichael, and Hugh Masekela. The event also included collaborative jam sessions among the invited performers.

In 1970, Pépé Kallé joined Orchestre Myosotis, which was led by Manzenza Nsala Munsala, where he performed Congolese rumba-inspired songs with several emerging artists and quickly attracted audiences in Kinshasa. Shortly after, in 1972, he recorded with Orchestre Bella Bella and contributed to the hits "Sola" and "Mbuta". The producer and saxophonist Verckys Kiamuangana Mateta, impressed by Pépé Kallé's voice and stage presence, recruited him into his band Orchestre Vévé, where he performed lead vocals on the hit "Nakomitunaka", which criticized the depiction of angels as being white and the marginalization of African identity in religious art. Following internal rivalries and financial disputes within Bella Bella in early 1973, Verckys reorganized musicians from his Editions Vévé International label into a new group, Lipua Lipua (also rendered Lipwa Lipwa), meaning "confusion" or "disorder", with Pépé Kallé, Nyboma, Assosa Tshimanga, and Tagar Mulembu Tshibau serving as its principal vocalists.

=== 1972–1985: Empire Bakuba's formation, early success, and releases ===
In late 1972, Pépé Kallé and Papy Tex participated in the recording of "Nazoki" and "Libaku Mabe" (Lingala for "bad luck"), which were released as singles by the group Les Bakuba, founded by Seskain Molenga after leaving Afrisa International. Molenga chose the name "Bakuba" as a tribute to the Kuba Kingdom after developing an interest in Zaire's pre-colonial history, a choice Pépé Kallé also appreciated because, according to him, "the king of the Bakuba is as big as I am". The recording sessions also introduced Pépé Kallé to Yossa Taluki and Dilu Dilumona of René Moreno's band Les As, although internal tensions soon began to emerge among the founders during the recording process. Molenga imagined the group as an "empire" in which the musicians and fans represented the people while the founders symbolized royalty. Although Pépé Kallé, Dilu, and Papy Tex handled much of the group's administration, Molenga regarded himself as its symbolic king and maintained that none of them could exclusively claim ownership of the name Empire Bakuba because, in his view, the founding "king" still symbolically existed.

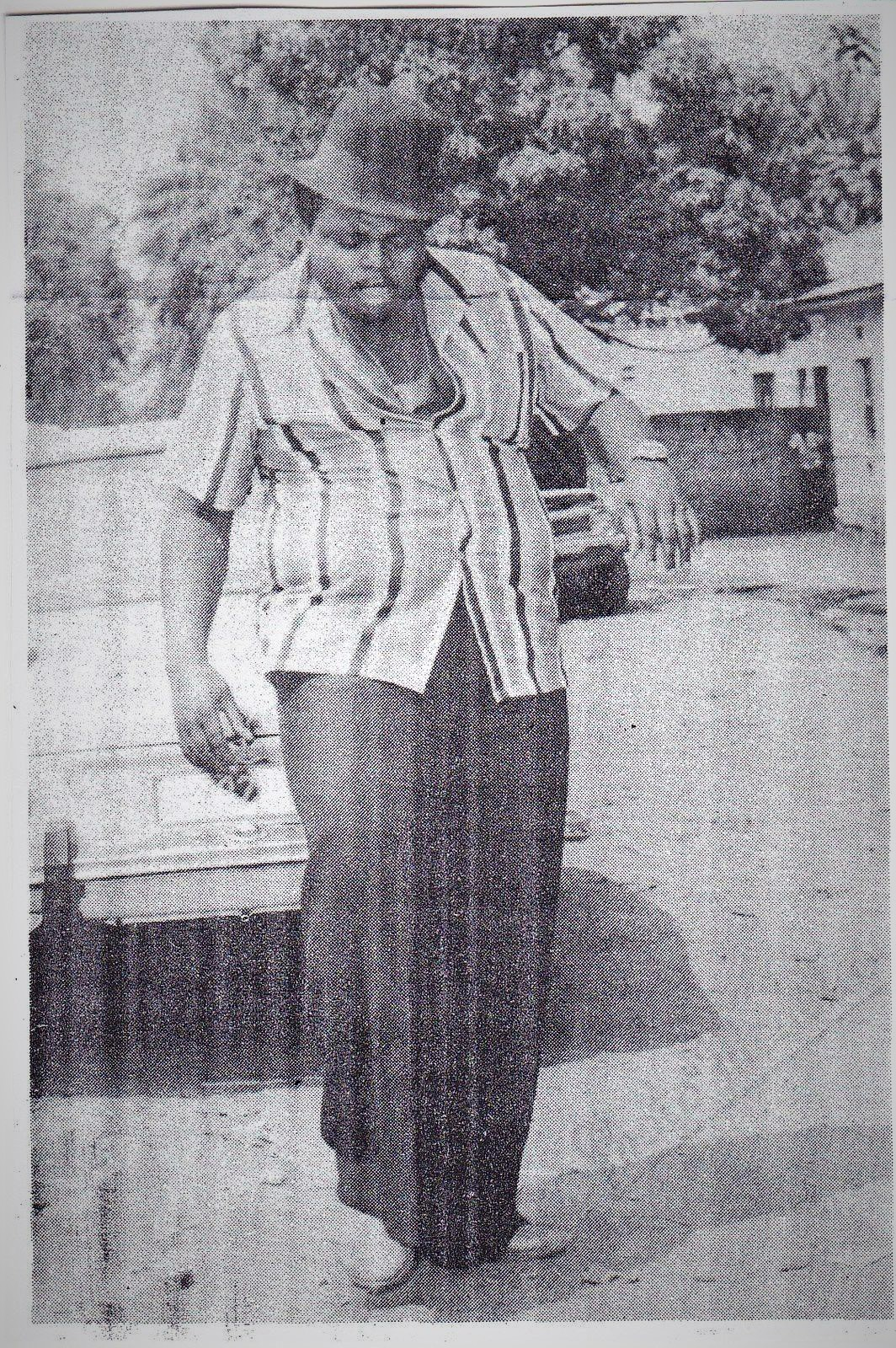
Pépé Kallé in 1978 in Kinshasa

Empire Bakuba was officially established in March 1973 under the joint leadership of Pépé Kallé, Papy Tex, and Dilu, and the band soon signed with Verckys' Éditions Vévé International. Pépé Kallé left Orchestre Vévé, because he was dissatisfied with what he called a "second-class status", and he later told Zaïre magazine: "I don't have a grudge against my former publisher [Verckys]. I have to admit, however, that for a long time I've wanted to fly on my own". Pépé Kallé and Papy Tex had first planned to revive African Choc, but Verckys reportedly pushed for the adoption of the name "Empire Bakuba". In its early period, the band survived mainly through studio recordings since it "had no instruments of its own", despite Verckys' promises to supply them. The band's principal vocal trio—Pépé Kallé, Dilu, and Matolu—became known as KaDiMa. Among Pépé Kallé's earliest compositions for Empire Bakuba, between 1973 and 1974, were "Milongo Ya Bana", "Kauka", and "Lundokisi"—the latter dedicated to his muse Pauline Ndekani Lundokisi. In 1978, he released "Dadou", which later appeared in multiple versions during the 1980s and 1990s. The song explored domestic struggles caused by an absent father and reminisced about the hardships and instability of urban life. In 1980, Empire Bakuba performed at the Malekia venue in Kasa-Vubu, Kinshasa, where Super Jeneusse Aroumbaya—a group created after Ditutala Mbuesa, Miyalu Kalonda, Bébé Atalaku, Nono Monzuluku, Djerba Manzeku, and Colorado left 3Z to form Bana Odeon—appeared as the opening act. At the end of the concert, Pépé Kallé, impressed by the performance of the 18-year-old Djouna "Big One" Mumbafu, asked him when he intended to join Empire Bakuba and later sent Londa, who had recently joined the band, to finalize Djouna's recruitment. In 1981, the group released their third album, L'Empire Bakuba De Pepe Kallé, Dilu Dilumona Et Papy Tex, which contained Pépé Kallé's hit "Zabolo". In 1982, after joining the Trio Madjesi's Editions Sosoliso and shortly before celebrating their tenth anniversary, Empire Bakuba had established their prominence on the Zairean music scene.

In 1984, Pépé Kallé appeared alongside Carlyto Lassa on the Alia Music-produced album Likita Ya Bilima, directed by Simaro Lutumba. The record featured Simaro's "Verre Cassée" and "Maya", Carlyto's "Nasala Nini?", and Denis Bonyeme's "Namekaki Bango". Additional musicians on included bassist Flavien Makabi, mi-solo guitarist Rodeo, soloist Papa Noël Nedule, tumba drummer Henri "Micorason" Weteto-Sasa, and saxophonist Empompo Deyesse. "Verre Cassé" and "Maya" became hits throughout Africa and were recognized as classics of Congolese rumba. The music critic Simba Ndaye remarked that Simaro excelled in "melancholic poetry" in "Verre Cassé", enhanced by Carlyto's "intentionally cracked voice" and Pépé Kallé's "thunderous baritone timbre". As Empire Bakuba gained international recognition, the group began touring outside Zaire. In 1985, they recorded the album Explosion Bonana '85 in Brazzaville, which included songs such as "Johnny Bitoto" and "Article 15 Beta Libanga". The latter title became a hit and referred to President Mobutu Sese Seko's cynical advice encouraging citizens to "rely on Article 15", a fictional constitutional provision humorously interpreted as "fend for yourselves". In the song, Pépé Kallé referenced the social hardships faced by ordinary people in Kinshasa. During the same year, Empire Bakuba also issued the four-track album Obosani Ki Somele through the Zairean label Mol-Mol. Supported by Pépé Kallé's "Obosani Ki Somele" alongside Papy Tex's "Malu", "Mwana Akimi Kelasi", and "Maguy", Obosani Ki Somele was arranged by Pépé Kallé and Papy Tex and mixed by Molende Kwi-Kwi. Later in 1985, the KaDiMa trio also issued the collaborative four-track album Chérie Ondi with Empire Bakuba.

The Afro-Rythmes-produced album Bombe Atomique also appeared that year and included Pépé Kallé's "Bombe Atomique" and "Wilfred Ya Pafioti" as well as Kichar Kilesa and Pépé Kallé's "Police de Roulage" and "Ebeme Ya Soso". According to Le Potentiel music critic Martin Enyimo, Pépé Kallé addressed ordinary people "directly in accessible language", using simple expressions such as "money does not bring happiness" and "only God knows" At the same time, he became known for double-entendre lyrics and irony about the difficulties of everyday life in Zaire. The band also adopted the extravagant La Sape fashion subculture, which pushes theatricality to Grand Guignol-like extremes. Because Pépé Kallé's giant physique sharply contrasted with the playful performances of the dwarf dancer Emoro—who joined Empire Bakuba in 1985 after reconnecting with Pépé Kallé in Kisangani, despite the pair having first known each other during a European tour in 1962—the band's live shows "became increasingly spectacular". This visual and theatrical style was especially accentuated in Bombe Atomique, which also earned Pépé Kallé the nickname "La Bombe Atomique" among fans and in the media.

== Solo career ==
=== 1986–1988: Solo beginnings, film debut ===
With Empire Bakuba now producing music in Paris after their settlement there in 1985, Pépé Kallé signed a record deal with Senegalese producer Ibrahima Sylla's Syllart Production. In 1986, Pépé Kallé and Nyboma released their six-track collaborative album Zouke Zouke under the Empire Bakuba name. Although rooted in soukous, the project was clearly directed toward the French Caribbean market and became one of the year's top-selling albums. It featured soloist Dally Kimoko, rhythm guitarists Lokassa Ya Mbongo and Boffi Banengola, and French composer Philippe Guez. Pépé Kallé composed songs such as "Dodo Limbisa Ngai", "Pamelo Okemema Ngambo", "Tika Makanisi", and the Creole-language track "Zouke Zouke" to connect with the Caribbean audience. The music critic Gary Stewart remarked that the song "rollicked at the pace of Paris soukous and Caribbean zouk", while noting that Pépé Kallé's embrace of the fast-paced Paris soukous sound eventually helped the album gain acceptance in Zaire, where reactions had initially been lukewarm. Around the same time, kwassa kwassa, a dance created by Jeanora and characterized by simultaneous back-and-forth movements of the hands and hips, quickly gained popularity throughout Africa. Many Congolese bands adopted the style, including Empire Bakuba, which released the four-track album Kwasa Kwasa in 1987.

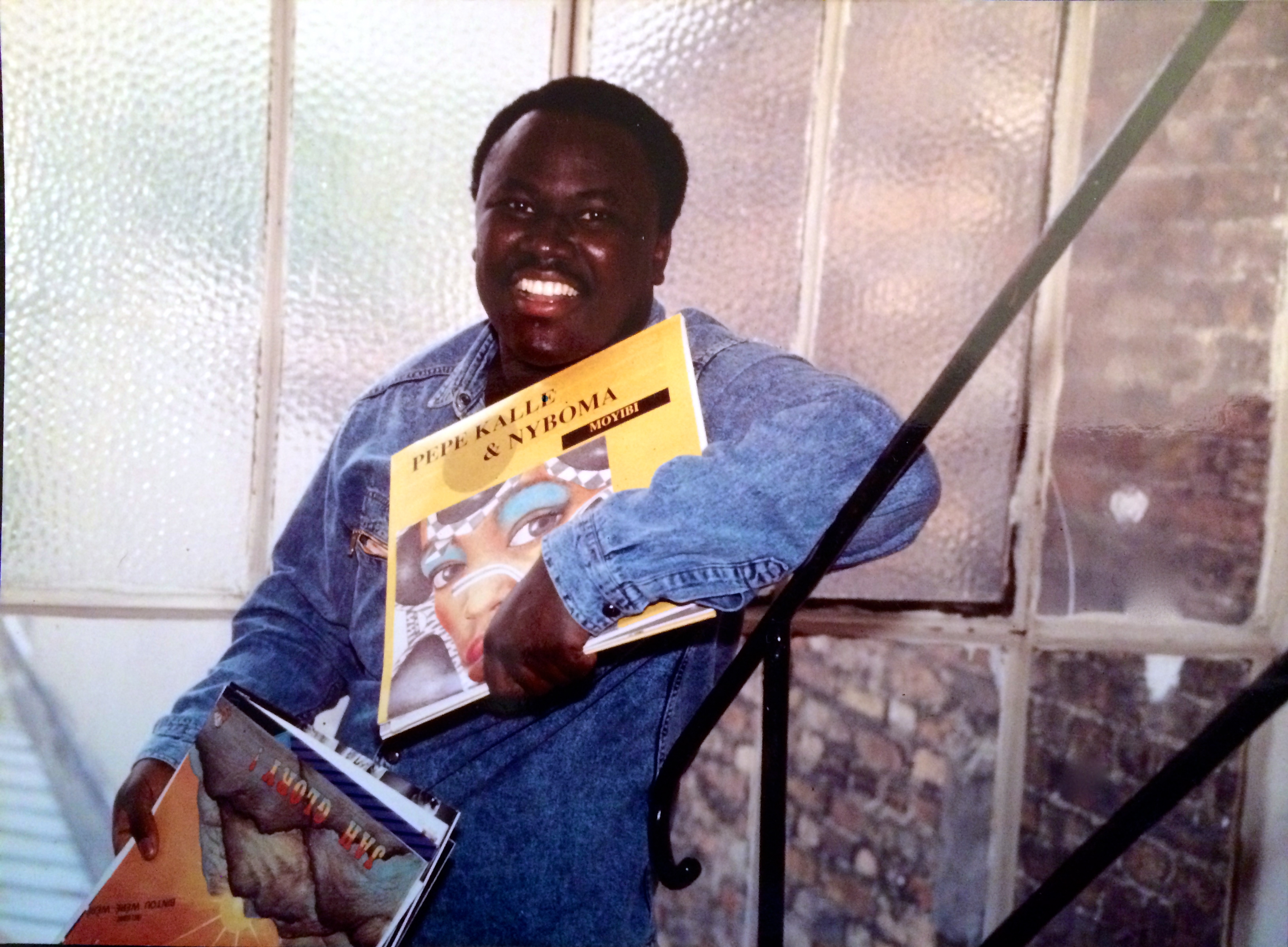
Ibrahima Sylla holding a vinyl record of the album Moyibi by Pépé Kalle and Nyboma from 1988

In 1987, the film La Vie est Belle, directed by Mweze Ngangura and Benoît Lamy and starring Papa Wemba, premiered in cinemas. Pépé Kallé made his first major international film appearance in the production. The movie was later screened at the Taormina International Film Festival and received an award at the Ghent International Film Festival. In 1988, Pépé Kallé contributed to the soundtrack of the film Black Mic Mac 2, in which he performed "Article 15 Beta Libanga" and appeared onstage with Empire Bakuba. He then reunited with Nyboma for their second collaborative six-track album, Moyibi, which surpassed the success of their previous project and further boosted their popularity in Africa and the Caribbean. The soukous-oriented album was arranged by Manu Lima and Lokassa Ya Mbongo, who also played rhythm guitar alongside lead guitarists Dally Kimoko and Vieux Faye. Moyibi also featured bassist Miguel Yamba; atalaku performers Kanda Bongo Man, Monzali, René Cabral, and Wuta Mayi; saxophonist Sulaiman Hakim; trombonist Pierre Chabrèle; trumpeter Ron Meza; and percussionists Michel Lorentz and Sammy Maracas, while Francis Perréard handled the mixing.

=== 1989–1991: Releases, tours, and collaborations ===
Pépé Kallé released two solo albums in 1989: Pon Moun Paka Bougé and Cé Chalè Carnaval. He co-produced, arranged, and mixed the four-track Pon Moun Paka Bougé with Jacky Reggan and producer David Ouattara. It included tumba drummer Komba Bellow Mafwala, lead guitarist Dally Kimoko, rhythm guitarist Diblo Dibala, bassist Ngouma Lokito, and synthesizer player Charles Maurinier. Pépé Kallé also served as an atalaku, alongside Luciana Demingongo and Solo Sita. Pon Moun Paka Bougé included the kwassa kwassa hit "Pon Moun Paka Bougé" as well as "Djarabi Adjatou", "Marché Commun", and "Bilala – Lala". "Djarabi Adjatou" recounted Pépé Kallé's romance with a young woman from Ouagadougou in Burkina Faso bearing the same name, who was said to have been "certainly charmed" by him during one of his African tours.

Cé Chalè Carnaval, also a four-track release performed with Empire Bakuba, included "Cé Chalè Carnaval", "Djoni Bitoto", "Tiembe Raid Pa Moli", and "Ndako Ya Zeke". Alongside Pon Moun Paka Bougé, the record achieved considerable success across Francophone Africa and played a role in popularizing generiques, the opening tracks in Congolese popular music built entirely around the sebene section. While traditional rumba generally followed a two-part structure with slower passages followed by fast sebene instrumentals, Pépé Kallé and Empire Bakuba instead "start out fast and then, for the second section, overlay the same beat with double-time cross-rhythms". The music critic Jon Pareles of The New York Times noted that soukous musicians in the 1980s were extending melodies, using "gentler vocals, streamlining the syncopations and topping the arrangements with an inexhaustible stream of rippling, arpeggiated guitar lines".

On 30 November that year, Pépé Kallé and Empire Bakuba performed at the Kilimanjaro "ethnic club" on West 19th Street in New York City, where they were scheduled to play for the remainder of the week. Emoro participated in the band's choreographed dances, swaying his hips and even performing a headstand routine while kicking his legs in the air to the rhythm. Pareles described the concert as a "revue" that featured instrumental showcases, solos from two backup singers with "distinctive high, sweet tenor" voices, elaborate dance routines, and Pépé Kallé's stage presence. At one point, three women from the audience were invited onstage to dance provocatively with Pépé Kallé and Emoro.

Pépé Kallé thereafter continued touring internationally and recording prolifically with Empire Bakuba. In July 1990, they released the SonoDisc-produced four-track album Liya Liya Faina. In the eponymous track, Pépé Kallé sang in Kiswahili about a woman from Rwanda, which endeared him to audiences in East Africa. That same year, he appeared on Empire Bakuba's six-track album Show Times, which was produced by Mayala and distributed through the Paris-based company Mélodie Distribution. Globe Style, a sub-label of the British company Ace Records, also issued his greatest hits compilation Gigantafrique!. Pépé Kallé's 1991 eight-track album, Gérant, became one of the most successful of his career. The music journalist François Bensignor noted that the record assembled an "unparalleled Parisian studio team" that reflected the "extraordinary melting pot that the French capital constituted for African music". The album featured backing vocals by Nyboma, Likinga Magenza, Luciana Demingongo, Abby Surya, Ballou Canta, Bessy, and Leila Negrau; Boncana Maïga led the brass section; and Manu Lima managed keyboards, programming, and arrangements alongside Souzy Kasseya, while Lokassa Ya Mbongo played rhythm guitar and served as executive producer. The recording sessions also brought together the lead guitarists Kimoko, Popolipo, and Kasseya, bassists Guy Nsangué and Ngouma Lokito, saxophonist Alain Hatot, and trumpeter Éric Giausserand. The album included the songs "Gérant", "Milla" (also titled "Roger Milla"), "Shikamo Seye", "Zonga Aime", "Pedro", "Beli Seyo", "Muyenga", and "Milla (Version Stade)". "Roger Milla" paid tribute to the Cameroonian footballer whose performances at the 1990 FIFA World Cup in Italy captivated global audiences.

=== 1992–1997: From Larger Than Life to Full Option ===
In January 1992, the British world music distributor Stern's Africa released Pépé Kallé's greatest hits compilation Larger Than Life, for which Pépé Kallé composed alongside Kasseya, who also handled arrangements together with Lokassa Ya Mbongo and Manu Lima, while Boncana Maïga arranged the horn section. The album featured bassists Guy Nsangué and Ngouma Lokito, lead guitarists Kimoko, Popolipo, and Kasseya, rhythm guitarist Lokassa Ya Mbongo, keyboardist and drum programmer Manu Lima, percussionist Mavungu, saxophonist Alain Hatot, trombonist Jacques Bolognesi, and trumpeter Eric Giausserand. In his review for AllMusic, Carl Hoyt observed that the songs "are a little more polished than Bakuba's and a tad heavy on the synth", but they do not overwhelm Pépé Kallé's vocals. During the same year, Empire Bakuba collaborated with Guadeloupean-Haitian singer-songwriter Doudou Bastide on the album Sacrée Doudou, a project that blended compas and soukous. They also issued the six-track album Divisé Par Deux, which included Pépé Kallé's "Divisé Par Deux", "Monano", and "Mama Leki Ndaya". It was released in France through Babi Production International and SonoDisc and featured bassist Godessy Lofombo, lead guitarists Doris Ebuya, Kinanga Boeing 737, and Rolls Papillon, rhythm guitarist Elvis N'Kunku, tumba drummer Yayay Londa, synthesizer player Ghi Matope, and atalaku Bileku Mpasi, also known as Djuna Mombafu. The title track, along with "Mama Leki Ndaya" and "Retroviseur", later became staples of Empire Bakuba's live performances. Another record released that year was the SonoDisc-produced collaborative album Lisanga Ya "Banganga" with Tabu Ley Rochereau. The six-track record was produced and artistically directed by Tabu Ley and arranged by Tabu Ley, Pépé Kallé, and Maïka Munan, who also directed the recording sessions and played acoustic and rhythm guitars.

In 1992, Empire Bakuba held a concert in Gaborone, Botswana, where Emoro died. Fellow bandmate Djouna stated that media reports claiming Emoro died onstage were inaccurate. According to him, Emoro began feeling ill after enjoying himself at a nightclub. Emoro, who had bowed legs associated with his dwarfism, had previously suffered similar pains. After his death, a temporary all-star collective of Zairean musicians that included Pépé Kallé, Nyboma, and Bopol Mansiamina came together to release the four-track tribute album Hommage à Emoro.

In 1994, the Paris-based record label Flash Diffusion Business issued the seven-track album Dieu Seul Sait, which was distributed by Ets Ndiaye. Empire Bakuba later released the Sun Records-produced nine-track album Gardez Votre Souffle, for which Pépé Kallé wrote songs including "Guyguy Madimba", "Don't Cry Dube", "Muana M'Mobowa", and "Young Africa". In 1996, he participated in the album Prudence UNICEF, which was dedicated to raising awareness about HIV/AIDS and supporting children orphaned by the epidemic in Kinshasa. The next year, B. Mas Production of Paris released Empire Bakuba's eight-track album Merci Maman, which was distributed by Debs Music. During the same year, Pépé Kallé also appeared on the Babi Production International collaborative album Full Option with Papy Tex and Empire Bakuba, an 11-track record that included his songs "Full Option", "Pesa Wax", and "Chou".

== Later years and death ==
In February 1998, Pépé Kallé made his first visit to the American West Coast after IMA Records invited him for a month-long tour with "Rigo Star's African Revue", a band that included guitarists Rigo Star and Syran Mbenza, along with singer Abby Surya. His final eight-track album, Cocktail, recorded at G.N.D Studios in Kinshasa and released through SonoDisc on 14 November 1998, was arranged, programmed, and produced by Empire Bakuba bassist Godessy Lofombo, who also mixed the album alongside Pépé Kallé and JP Kyss Kyungu. The album brought together lead guitarists Doris Ebuya, Kinanga Boeing 737, and Mateta Papillon, rhythm guitarist Elvis N'Kunku, synthesizer player Bruno Nsona, atalakus Bileku Mpasi, Jhon Scott, Moussa, and Papy Rebelle, conga player Shora Ekunde, and sound engineers Guy Matope and Papy.

Two weeks later, on 28 November, Pépé Kallé suffered a heart attack at his home in Kinshasa and was rushed to the nearby Clinique Ngaliema, where he died shortly after midnight. His death shocked the nation and was treated as a national tragedy. Tabu Ley Rochereau, one of his mentors, described him as the "only musician who never had a problem with anybody" and praised his role in uniting different generations of musicians. The Culture and Arts Minister Juliana Lumumba declared that a state funeral would be held at the Palais du Peuple and ordered the suspension of musical performances nationwide in his honor. His remains were displayed at various sites throughout Kinshasa linked to his personal and professional life. The music historian Gary Stewart noted that "more than one million people" reportedly gathered at the Palais du Peuple and along the funeral procession route to pay their respects. He was buried on 6 December 1998 at Gombe Cemetery during a large state funeral attended by political leaders and ordinary citizens.

== Personal life ==
Pépé Kallé's first love was Pauline Ndekani Lundokisi, with whom he regularly attended church in his youth. Lundokisi's parents, however, opposed their relationship and insisted that she could only marry a Kuba. In 1973, Pépé Kallé dedicated the song "Lundokisi" to her, and two years later, in 1975, his parents arranged for him to marry a 15-year-old girl named Brune Tshite. Although Pépé Kallé accepted the union out of obedience, he continued seeing Lundokisi, and this persistent involvement with her eventually led to his divorce from Tshite due to infidelity.

As Pépé Kallé sought to officially establish a relationship with Lundokisi, his parents introduced another young woman, Mweni, then aged 16. Despite the marriage, Pépé Kallé remained emotionally attached to Lundokisi, and Mweni eventually left after a year, having given birth to a son. In 1979, Pépé Kallé began a relationship with Mimi, whom he reportedly loved "almost as fiercely as Pauline". However, while he was touring Europe, Mimi became involved in another relationship, which inspired Pépé Kallé to compose the 1981 song "Zabolo", the Lingala word for "devil". He then settled with Lundokisi, and the couple had three children together. Nevertheless, by the time of his death, the music critic Christina Roden wrote in 1998 that he was "survived by his wife and five children". Lundokisi died on 23 February 2019.

== Legacy ==
Pépé Kallé was one of the co-founding bandleaders of Empire Bakuba in 1973, which emerged as one of the influential bands of Congolese popular music by bridging older Congolese rumba with the younger, upbeat sounds that dominated Kinshasa's music scene during the 1970s and 1980s. Influenced by Le Grand Kallé, he blended rumba-style singing with fiery showmanship, while Empire Bakuba continued using brass instruments at a time when many younger bands, such as Zaïko Langa Langa, had abandoned horn arrangements. His collaboration with Nyboma on the 1986 hit "Zouke Zouke" helped introduce and popularize Paris-inspired soukous in Congo through a fusion of rapid soukous rhythms and zouk influences. The 1989 solo albums Pon Moun Paka Bougé and Cé Chalè Carnaval also popularized the "générique", a fast-paced opening section centered almost entirely around rapid sebene guitar patterns and choreographed dance performances. Rather than following the traditional rumba format of slow vocal passages leading into sebene sections, Pépé Kallé and Empire Bakuba frequently intensified the same rhythm through accelerated cross-rhythms and layered instrumentation. The music critic Jon Pareles noted that Congolese musicians of the era extended melodies with "gentler vocals" and "an inexhaustible stream of rippling, arpeggiated guitar lines", innovations that became associated with Empire Bakuba's sound. Toward the end of his career, however, Pépé Kallé increasingly called for stylistic renewal within soukous. During his last interview, with C.C. Smith, he argued that "soukous has reached an impasse" and insisted that Congolese artists needed to pursue new musical directions instead of relying solely on repetitive dance formulas. Although he reaffirmed his attachment to rumba and African folk, he promoted a synthesis of folk music, rap, Afrobeat, and world music influences. In 1998, he explained that "I'm looking for a new path" and promised listeners "the new sound of Pepe Kallé". His final album, Cocktail, is often viewed as his determination to modernize soukous while remaining rooted in its traditional foundations.

Standing over 6 feet (1.8 m) tall and weighing more than 300 pounds (140 kg), Pépé Kallé often built his stage performances around the contrast between his imposing physique and the playful presence of the dwarf dancers Emoro Penga, Dokolos, and Jolie Bébé. In a 1998 interview with C.C. Smith, Pépé Kallé described the symbolism behind this contrast: "We are two extremes. On one side, you have Pépé Kallé, six feet—on the other side, opposite side, you have a little guy, short, a dwarf... without even starting to play, it is a big spectacle". Combined with Empire Bakuba's embrace of the flamboyant La Sape fashion subculture, these performances propped up the band's increasingly theatrical stage reputation with the dance style known as masasi calculé and influenced the visual culture of Congolese dance music throughout the 1980s and 1990s.

Although many leading Congolese musicians relocated to Europe during the political and economic turmoil of the Mobutu Sese Seko and Laurent-Désiré Kabila periods, Pépé Kallé chose to remain in Kinshasa, explaining in 1998: "I don't want to cut myself off from my roots". The veteran journalist Achille Ngoye likewise remembered Pépé Kallé as "a man of the people" with "an elephantine memory", capable of spontaneously greeting audience members through his songs during performances.

== Selected discography ==
=== Albums ===
Year	Album	Label	Details
1982	Pepe Kale Et L'Empire Bakuba	Éditions Vévé International	With Empire Bakuba
1982	L'Empire Bakuba De Pepe Kallé, Dilu Dilumona Et Papy Tex (also titled Empire Bakuba)	Éditions Vévé International	Collaborative album with Empire Bakuba, Dilu Dilumona, and Papy Tex
1983	Verckys Présente L'Empire Bakuba	Éditions Vévé International	With Empire Bakuba
1984	Likita Ya Bilima	Alia Music	Collaborative album with Carlyto Lassa and Simaro Lutumba
1985	Bonana 85	Alia Music	With Empire Bakuba
1985	Chérie Ondi	Éditions Vévé International	Collaborative album with Dilu Dilumona, Papy Tex, and Empire Bakuba
1985	Obosani Ki Somele	Mol-Mol	With Empire Bakuba
1985	Bombe Atomique	Afro-Rythmes	With Empire Bakuba
1986	Zouke Zouke	Syllart Production	Collaborative album with Nyboma
1986	Massasy Calcule A Abidjan	A.C.M.P.I.	Collaborative album with Emoro and Empire Bakuba
1986	Soucis Ya Likinga	Kagi Production	With Empire Bakuba
1987	Kwasa Kwasa	Leader Records	With Empire Bakuba
1987	Sombokila	Tsavo Records	With Empire Bakuba
1988	L'Argent Ne Fait Pas Le Bonheur!	Gefraco	Solo album
1988	Moyibi	Syllart Production	Collaborative album with Nyboma
1989	Mwana Ndeke – Diarrhee Verbale	JM Production	Collaborative album with Simaro Lutumba
1989	Pon Moun Paka Bougé	Afro-Rythmes	Solo album
1989	Cé Chalè Carnaval	A.F.R.	Solo album
1989	Atinze Mwana Popi	Babi Production International	Solo album
1989	Les Deux Geants De La Musique Zairoise	M.D.L. Production	Collaborative album with Mavuela Somo and Empire Bakuba
1990	Liya Liya Faina	SonoDisc	With Empire Bakuba
1990	Show Times	Mayala	With Empire Bakuba
1990	Gigantafrique!	Globe Style	Greatest hits compilation
1990	"Santa" (Amour Eloko Malamu)	Sudima Production	Collaborative album with Bozi Boziana
1991	Gerant	Syllart Production	Solo album
1992	Larger Than Life	Stern's Africa	Greatest hits compilation
1992	Hommage À Emoro	Syllart Production	Tribute album to Empire Bakuba dancer Emoro
1992	Sacrée Doudou	Not on label	Collaborative album with Doudou Bastide and Empire Bakuba
1992	Divisé Par Deux	Babi Production International	With Empire Bakuba
1992	Lisanga Ya "Banganga"	SonoDisc	Collaborative album with Tabu Ley Rochereau
1992	Mamie Music Clarification	Editions Kaluila	Collaborative album with Papy Tex and Empire Bakuba
1994	Dieu Seul Sait	Flash Diffusion Business	Solo album
1995	Gardez Votre Souffle	Sun Records	With Empire Bakuba
1997	Merci Maman	B. Mas Production	With Empire Bakuba
1997	Full Option	Babi Production International	Collaborative album with Papy Tex and Empire Bakuba
1998	Cocktail	SonoDisc	Solo album

=== Singles ===
Year	Single	Label
1973	"Milongo Ya Bana"	African
1974	"Kauka"	African
1974	"Lundokisi"	Pathé
1978	"Kanindo"	Taty

== Filmography ==
- La Vie est Belle (1987)
- Black Mic Mac 2 (1988) — cameo appearance with Empire Bakuba and soundtrack contribution ("Article 15 Beta Libanga")
- Tango Ya Ba Wendo (1992) – documentary film appearance
