= Mbenza =

Mbenza is a surname and given name. Notable people with the name include:

== Given name ==
- Mbenza Bedi (born 1984), Congolese footballer

== Surname ==
- Guy Mbenza (born 2000), Congolese footballer
- Isaac Mbenza (born 1996), Belgian footballer
- Pasi Mbenza (born 1966), Congolese cyclist
- Syran Mbenza (born 1950), Congolese guitarist
