= Ibrahima Sylla =

Senegalese-Ivorian record producer (1956–2013)

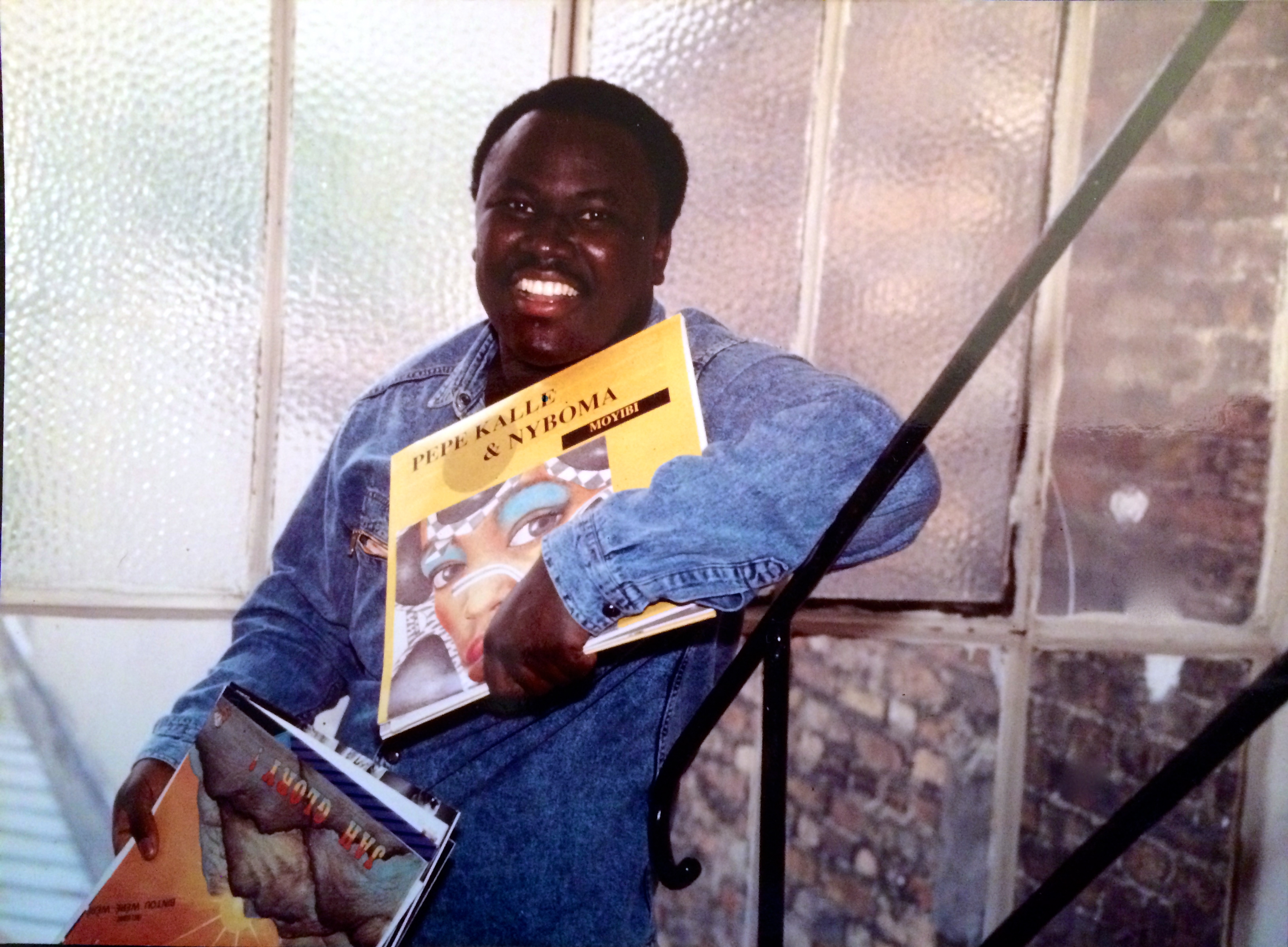
Ibrahima Sylla in 1989

Ibrahima Sylla (2 April 1956 – 30 December 2013) was a Senegalese record producer born in Ivory Coast and founder of the African music label Syllart Records. He was a musician whose production and music direction defined popular African music. From West African dance, to Congolese soukous (sung in Lingala), to melodic griot-led songs, Sylla's signature as a music producer is unmistakable. He has demonstrated his familiarity with many contemporary African musical genres, and he has worked with most of Africa's musical greats.

== Biography ==
Sylla was born in the Ivory Coast, into a prominent family; his father was Guinean (French Guinea) and was an influential public figure who was well known in West Africa, and whose work took the family to Dakar in Senegal. Sylla developed his love for music whilst studying at a university in Paris, France. He released compilation albums of his favorite Salsa music, and from 1980 he embarked on record production work. He financed an album by Étoile de Dakar, featuring Youssou N'Dour and Orchestra Baobab. It was in Paris that Sylla developed working relationships with Africa's upcoming musicians, many of whom were living there.

Sylla has worked with many of Africa's contemporary musicians and he has demonstrated finesse in his production of their music. He worked with many of Zaire's (now the Democratic Republic of Congo) greats, including: Les Quatre Etoiles - the renowned DRC group consisting of soukous greats Bopol, Wuta Mayi, Syran Mbenza and Nyboma; Pépé Kallé, Sam Mangwana, Tshala Muana, Mbilia Bel, and others. Sylla developed the soukous concept of tingling, repeated, guitar melodies, adding orchestral harmonies, innovative key changes, and introducing tinges of salsa music. An example of this can be experienced in his production of Nyboma's groundbreaking solo album, Anicet.

Zairean Soukous music is highly popular across Africa, South America, and among World Music fans in the West. Sylla's soukous productions are still celebrated, and they continue to influence the shape and direction of African dance music.

Sylla's production excellence is also demonstrated by his productions of West African dance music, such as in Oumou Dioubate's albums, and in his direction of Malian and Senegalese griot-led songs. He has also worked with Baaba Maal, Bako Dagnon, Ismael Lo, Pape Seck, Oumou Sangare, Gnonnàs Pedro, Kouyate Sory Kandia, Bembeya Jazz, Fanta Damba, Cape Verde Show, Alpha Blondy, Africando, and Miriam Makeba.

A recent compilation of his work, the five-album 20 Years History - The Very Best of Syllart Productions (Sono/Sterns), introduces new listeners to Sylla's work.
