= Madilu System =

Congolese singer (1950–2007)

- Also known as: Madilu Multi System; Grand Ninja; Le Grand Pharaon; Ramses II
- Born: Jean de Dieu Bialu Makiese; 28 May 1950; Kisantu, Belgian Congo (present-day Democratic Republic of the Congo)
- Died: 11 August 2007 (aged 57) Kinshasa, Democratic Republic of the Congo
- Genre: Congolese rumba
- Occupations: Singer-songwriter; bandleader
- Instrument: Vocals
- Years active: 1969–2007
- Labels: VISA; Edipop Production; Rythmes Et Musique; Bleu Caraïbes; Espera; Musicanova; Syllart Records; Babi Production International; SonoDisc; JPS Production; KTC
- Formerly of: Orchestre Symba; Orchestre Bamboula; Festival des Maquisards; Fiesta Populaire; Orchestre Bella Bella; Orchestre Bakuba Mayopi; Orchestre Pamba Pamba; Orchestre Afrisa International; TPOK Jazz; Tout Puissant Multi-System

Jean de Dieu Bialu Makiese (28 May 1950 – 11 August 2007), known professionally as Madilu System, was a Congolese singer-songwriter and bandleader. Over a nearly four-decade career, he became one of the leading vocalists in Congolese rumba. He was noted for his husky tenor voice and was referred to by various nicknames, among them the "Madilu Multi System", "Grand Ninja", "Le Grand Pharaon (The Great Pharaoh)", and "Ramses II".

Madilu began performing in 1969 and his early groups included Orchestre Symba, Papa Noël Nedule's Orchestre Bamboula, Fiesta Populaire, and Orchestre Bella Bella. He later co-founded Orchestre Bakuba Mayopi, where the hit "Pamba-Pamba" brought him early recognition, before forming Orchestre Pamba-Pamba and briefly performing with Tabu Ley Rochereau's Afrisa International. His breakthrough came in 1980 when he joined TPOK Jazz, led by Franco Luambo. Initially recruited as a backup vocalist, he became one of the band's principal vocalists in 1983 after Franco spotlighted him during the recording of the controversial track "Non". He then provided lead vocals on hits such as the 1984 "Mamou (Tu Vois)" and the 1985 duet "Mario" with Franco.

Following Franco's death in 1989 and altercations in TPOK Jazz in December 1993, Madilu launched a solo career. Alternating between Europe and Kinshasa, he led his own band, Tout Puissant Multi-Système, and released a series of albums, including Sans Commentaire (1993), Album '95 (1995), L'eau (1998), Pouvoir (1999), Bonheur (2001), and La Bonne Humeur (2007). He also collaborated with artists, including Nyboma, Zaïko Langa Langa, Rigo Star, Josky Kiambukuta, and the Afro-salsa group Africando. He died on 11 August 2007 in Kinshasa at age 57.

== Early life and career ==
=== 1950–1971: Childhood, education and musical debut ===
Jean de Dieu Bialu Makiese was born on 28 May 1950 in Kisantu, Bas-Congo (now Kongo Central, Democratic Republic of the Congo), to Antoine Bialu Kaba and Madeleine Makiese. Shortly after his birth, the family moved to the colonial capital, Léopoldville (now Kinshasa), where they settled in the commune of Kimbanseke. As the oldest and only son, Bialu was raised alongside his four sisters: Élisabeth, Bena, Madeleine ("Mado"), who later married actor Sans Soucis, and Diana Nsimba Bialu.

Growing up in post-independence Kinshasa, Bialu often skipped school to follow local bands, and on one occasion he disappeared from home for an entire week to watch them, which nearly led to his expulsion from school. His father intervened and persuaded the school to readmit him. After finishing sixth-form secondary school, his mother arranged an administrative position for him, but he turned it down to pursue a musical career. When his parents later separated, Bialu became the family's primary provider, using income from his early performances to provide for his mother and younger sisters.

Bialu began his music career in 1969 at the age of 19 with Orchestre Symba. He subsequently joined Orchestre Bamboula, led by guitarist Papa Noël Nedule, where he performed alongside Pépé Kallé, Wuta Mayi, and other musicians. He later became a member of Festival des Maquisards, led by Sam Mangwana. In 1971, he performed with Fagus Izeidi's Fiesta Populaire before briefly joining the Soki brothers' Orchestre Bella Bella. His stage name was inspired in part by James Brown. While in Izeidi's band, Izeidi suggested "James Madhi" for Bialu, with "Madhi" drawn from a Tamil term meaning "moon" or "knowledge/mind". Unconvinced by the "James" part, he retained "Madhi", omitted the "h" due to a spelling error to form "Madi", and then combined it with the final syllable of his surname, "lu", to create the stage name "Madilu".

=== 1973–1980: Early leading band ventures ===
In 1973, under President Mobutu Sese Seko's authenticité policy, which required many Zaireans to abandon Western or Christian names, often those of European saints, in favor of authentic "Zairean" names, Madilu started going by his surname, Bialu. That year, he joined guitarist Yossa Taluki and vocalist Pirès to form Orchestre Bakuba Mayopi, whose name was derived from the first two letters of each co-founder's name (Ma-Yo-Pi). The band released singles including "Zunguluke", "Mbiyavanga" and "Sunda", while Madilu composed "Kaya Yolande", "Nzele" and the hit "Pamba-Pamba" between 1973 and 1975. After internal disagreements, he left the group in 1976 to form Orchestre Pamba Pamba, which was named after the band's hit. The group dissolved within two years despite releasing several singles.

In 1978, he joined Orchestre Afrisa International, the band led by Tabu Ley Rochereau. Working primarily as a backing vocalist, Madilu found himself obscured by Tabu Ley's demanding leadership and the band's established stars, and had limited opportunities to record lead vocals. The low point of his association with the band happened in 1980 when the band was invited to perform a series of high-profile concerts in Paris. Having never traveled outside Central Africa, Madilu was scheduled to fly with the group. He spent the night before departure awake with excitement and arrived early at Ndjili Airport. However, he was left stranded at the terminal when Tabu Ley and the band management boarded the aircraft. The incident left him without financial support in Kinshasa.

=== 1980–1991: TPOK Jazz and breakthrough ===
In April 1980, after leaving Afrisa, Madilu was recruited into TPOK Jazz. He was introduced to bandleader Franco Luambo by vocalist Ntesa Dalienst. During his first three years with TPOK Jazz, Madilu remained virtually unknown to the public. He worked primarily as a live backing vocalist and did not appear prominently on the band's studio recordings. During this period, Franco reportedly doubted Madilu's vocal abilities and frequently telling other band members that he lacked the refinement necessary for a lead role. In 1982, he appeared as a backing vocalist on tracks such as "Aimer sans amour" and "Très fâché".

Madilu's professional breakthrough occurred in 1983 during TPOK Jazz's European tour. Franco had composed the classic "Non", a Congolese rumba about the breakdown of a marriage by casting blame on the wife. Earlier, in 1978, Franco and several of his musicians had been imprisoned at the Makala Central Prison by Zaire's Attorney General due to the explicit and politically sensitive lyrics of his songs "Helene" and "Jackie". Fearing further legal consequences, the band's main vocalists, including Josky Kiambukuta and Dalienst, refused Franco's requests to sing the lead vocals on "Non". Seeking a vocalist for the song, Franco met Madilu in a hotel hallway just as the singer was preparing to leave the group permanently. Franco invited him to try the lead vocal part in an informal recording session. Madilu sang the lyrics into a portable cassette recorder while Franco accompanied him on acoustic guitar. When Franco played back the recording, his wife Annie Mbuli, who was also at the hotel, was astounded by Madilu's voice and wondered how such a gifted singer had remained unnoticed in the background of the orchestra for three years.

The release of "Non" in 1983 was a massive commercial success and established Madilu as one of TPOK Jazz's leading vocalists, as well as Franco's preferred duet partner. Music scholar Gary Stewart noted that "Non" is built around a simple guitar pattern of only eleven notes, and while the melody was appealing, he described the lyrics as a harsh satire of women's behavior, addressing themes such as rejection of polygamous relationships, leaving husbands, and prostitution. The contrast between Franco's deep, spoken-word commentary and Madilu's tenor became part of the band's signature sound. That same year, he was a guest on two single recordings ("Madesu" and "Mama Akoma Kotekisa") by Nono Monzuluku and Zaïko Langa Langa.

In 1984, Franco released "Mamou (Tu Vois)" as the B-side of the LP Très Impoli, a theatrical rumba about two women trading accusations of marital infidelity and societal gossip (radio trottoir). Madilu sang the lead role of a married woman defending her extramarital affairs by accusing her friend of being a troublemaker. "Mamou" became a major success across sub-Saharan Africa and around African diaspora in Europe. That year, Madilu also performed another duet on Franco's composition "Makambo ezali bourreau" and Madilu's first composition for the band, "Pesa Position", an up-tempo track on the album Franco et le T.P. O.K. Jazz à l'Ancienne Belgique.

In 1985, Franco released "Mario", which was written by him and released on the eponymous album Mario. The song, which tells the story of an educated young man who chooses to live as a gigolo supported by an older, wealthy woman, became one of the band's biggest commercial successes. Madilu provided the lead vocals as the female protagonist, while Franco interjected spoken-word admonitions and sung vocals. The duo followed this with the critically acclaimed "La Vie des Hommes" (1986), a critique of male behavior released on the eponymous album marking TPOK Jazz's 40th anniversary. That year, Madilu had a hit with "Boma Ngai Nga Naboma Yo". In 1988, he contributed backing vocals to So.Pe.Ka, an album by his fellow band member Josky Kiambukuta. The album, for which Kiambukuta composed all the tracks, also featured fellow band member Malage de Lugendo and guest guitarist Mayaula Mayoni.

In 1989, while Franco was seriously ill, Madilu collaborated with singer Nyboma on the album Stop Feu Rouge, Voisin, released on the Bleu Caraïbes label. Madilu wrote two hits, "Magali" and "Voisin". That same year, he appeared as a guest artist on Rigo Star's album Exploration, alongside Mbilia Bel, contributing to the track "Mother Africa". He also released a duet album with Kiambukuta titled Destin, La Sincérité, which included his composition "Destin", dedicated to his wife, Pierrette Mbiyavanga Matumona. Franco's death on 12 October 1989 affected the structure of TPOK Jazz. Simaro Lutumba took over the band's leadership. In 1990, the band's first album after Franco's death, Eau Bénite (subtitled Héritage De Luambo Franco), on the Tamaris label. Madilu served as the lead vocalist on Simaro Lutumba-written title track "Eau Bénite", which became one of the band's greatest classics. In 1991, he composed "Mort Vivant Somida" on the TPOK Jazz album Maby… Tonton Zala Sérieux.

=== 1992–2007: Solo career ===
In 1992, Madilu began recording solo material while continuing to perform with TPOK Jazz. He released his debut solo LP, Na Pokwa Ya Lelo, through the Espera label. The album included two new tracks and a medley of his earlier hits.

In 1993, Madilu released Sans Commentaire, recorded at Studio Harry Son in Paris and issued by Syllart Records. Supported by the success of the hit songs "Ya Jean" and "Biya", the album achieved widespread success across sub-Saharan Africa and helped establish his solo career. He also appeared on TPOK Jazz's album Chaude Ambiance. It was one of the final major releases by the band's core lineup released as TPOK Jazz. Later that year, following a solo tour of Europe, he was suspended for several months by the administrators of TPOK Jazz for allegedly performing under the band's name, which was reserved for the group's official activities. During his suspension, tensions intensified between the band's musicians and Franco's family. According to Lutumba, the family proposed a 60–40 division of the band's revenues in its favor, a plan that the musicians rejected. After an ultimatum was reportedly issued to Lutumba, he resigned from TPOK Jazz, and most members followed him to form Bana OK under his leadership after a farewell concert in December 1993. Madilu did not join the new group, instead pursued his solo career. In 1995, he released Album '95 (also known as Le Nouveau Madilu System). The album included the hits "Frère Édouard", a narrative-driven piece with spoken dialogues, "Fanta", "Maria", "Shamita", "Pardon", "Djaffar", and the folkloric-inspired "Mbadicoco". He subsequently founded his backing band, Tout Puissant Multi-System (later referred to as OK System), with members including drummer Adricha Tipo Tipo, guitarists Fofo Le Collégien, Volvo Lukebuka, and atalaku Jeannot Ngidi Ngodi.

Madilu divided his time between Zaire and Western Europe, particularly France, which had become a major center for Congolese musicians. He often collaborated with Paris-based musicians while maintaining an active touring schedule in Europe and Africa. He also collaborated with Debaba Mbaki on the collaborative album Licencié Sans Fonction. In 1998, Madilu issued L'Eau, a thematically diverse album produced under JPS Productions. The album included the Franco tribute "Yaya", the title track "L'Eau", "Colonisation", "Mokonzi", "Saah", "Sans Effets", "Ako", "Tends-Moi la Main", "Soeur en Christ", and "Thermomètre". In 1999, he released the 10-track album Pouvoir, which featured the hits "Faute Ya Visa" and "Si Je Savais Ça". He followed it with Bonheur in December 2001. Like his earlier solo work, Bonheur explored romantic relationships, social life, and daily experiences. Musically, it blended rumba odemba style with extended guitar passages and vocal harmonies typical of the Paris-based Congolese scene, including Nyboma, Wuta Mayi and Malage de Lugendo.

Le Tenant du Titre, released in 2004, was the first studio recording of Tout Puissant Multi-System, after several lineup changes. In 2006, he appeared on Kékélé's album Kinavana, singing on the track "Tapale". In 2007, he reprised "Mario" as a guest vocalist on Africando's Ketukuba. That spring, Madilu completed his final album La Bonne Humeur, which he recorded with Syran Mbenza, Caien Madoka, Fofo Le Collégien, Dally Kimoko and Papa Noël, alongside singers Nyboma and Wuta Mayi, who each contributed a song. It was released in June. Frank Bessem described Madilu's voice as remaining strong and considered La Bonne Humeur as one of his best solo recordings.

== Death ==
In early August 2007, Madilu travelled to Kinshasa to shoot music videos for La Bonne Humeur. He collapsed on 10 August 2007 and was admitted to the Clinique Universitaire de Kinshasa. He died there early on 11 August around 7:00 a.m., from complications related to long-standing diabetes and hypertension.

His funeral was the subject of considerable public attention in Kinshasa. The burial, initially scheduled for 21 August, was postponed after the government assumed responsibility for organizing the ceremony. He was ultimately buried on 22 August. La Bonne Humeur's music videos were released on DVD in October of that year.

== Personal life ==
Madilu was married to Pierrette Biya, who was living in Paris at the time of his death. They had three children: Magali Madilu, Blaise Bialu, and Letitia Madilu.

Away from music, he was said to value people who were serious, friendly, modest, and generous, and to dislike dishonesty, arrogance, and ingratitude. His favorite dish was reportedly mfumbwa served with chikwangue and smoked or grilled fish.

== Discography ==
- Na Pokwa Ya Lelo (1992)
- Sans Commentaire (1993)
- Album '95 (1995)
- L'eau (1998)
- Pouvoir (1999)
- Bonheur (2001)
- Le tenant du titre (2004)
- La Bonne Humeur (2007)

== See also ==
- Franco Luambo
- Sam Mangwana
- Josky Kiambukuta
