= Bako Dagnon =

Malian singer

- Born: 1948 or 1953; Golobladji, Mali
- Died: 7 July 2015; Bamako, Mali
- Occupation(s): Griot, singer
- Years active: 1966–2015

Bako Dagnon (1948 or 1953 – 7 July 2015) was a Malian griot singer. She is considered to be a popular representative of Mandinka culture and has released several records in local languages.

== Early life ==
Bako Dagnon was born in the little village of Golobladji, around 20 kilometers away from Kita in a family of griots and n'goni players. The origins of her family can be traced back to the time of Sundiata Keita. In her birth village, she learned the songs from Ségou from her grandmother and those from Guinea from her mother, while her grandfather who had fought with Samori Ture taught her battlefields songs.

Her mother died when Bako Dagnon was seven years old, her father sent her into the care of a childless wife of a griot in Kita. Because she was badly treated that she finally left her adopted family later on to study the stories of the Mandinka Empire before its colonisation (the "tariku") with the grand Mandinka griot Kele Monson Diabate.

== Career ==
=== First success ===
In 1966, Bako Dagnon gave her first public concert in Kita during the local edition of the "Youth Week" (Semaine de la Jeunesse). This event had been created by the first president Modibo Keïta to "boost the cultural traditions of Mali". She performed a Fulani song in Bambara, Yirijanko Le, for which she won an award that allowed her to participate at the regional edition of the "Youth Week" of Kayes Region the following year. There she won again and performed at the national competition, the Bamako Biennale. Following these successes she performed regularly with the Regional Orchestra of Kita. In Bamako, she sang on weddings and gained popularity.

=== Work with the Ensemble Instrumental National ===
On demand of the Minister of Arts, Sports and Culture of the time, in 1974, Bako Dagnon joined Mali's National Instrumental Ensemble (Ensemble Instrumental National or EIN) which had been established shortly after the declaration of independence in 1961. The EIN was the most prestigious music ensemble in the country and consisted of about forty of the best Malian musicians. Although Bako Dagnon didn't live in Bamako but in Kita with her husband and children, she regularly performed with the EIN. She also joined the EIN on a concert tour in Korea and China, where she played for Mao. Her performances led to an increase of her own reputation and that of the EIN as well. She gained notoriety in the whole of Mali with the song Tiga Monyonko (meaning "while peeling peanuts") which remains one of her most popular songs.

=== Career without the EIN ===
It was only in 1980 that the singer chose to move to Bamako with her children. After a serious road accident, Bako Dagnon decided to leave the National Instrumental Ensemble of Mali which at the time was also suffering from a lack of funding and the omnipresent government corruption. In 1990, she was offered a record deal by an Indian music producer from Liberia and registered her first cassette record. After the recording of a second cassette, the production company disappeared in the midst of the First Liberian Civil War.

In the 1990s, Bako Dagnon continued giving public and private concerts. She did no recordings until the beginning of the 2000s when she also managed in gaining popularity outside of Mali. She participated on the albums Mandekalou (2004) and Mandekalou II (2006) of the Mandika griot collective of the same name of Ibrahima Sylla. She also appeared on the song Donso Ke on the album Electro Bamako (2006) by Marc Minelli. Her first international solo album, Titati, was again produced by Ibrahima Sylla and appeared on his label Syllart Records in 2007. François Bréant was the musical director.

Sidiba, her seventh album, was released two years later. The song Le guide de la révolution was the only song in French and was released as a single.

On 14 January 2009, Bako Dagnon was made a knight of the National Order of Mali.

== Death ==
Bako Dagnon died on 7 July 2015 at around six in the morning at the Hospital of Point-G in Bamako after a long illness. Her funeral was organised the following day in the neighbourhood Hamdallaye ACI 2000 where she had been living. The funeral took place in the presence of numerous personalities, including members of the government and Keïta Aminata Maiga, the First Lady of Mali from 2013 to 2020.

== Discography (incomplete) ==
- 2004: Mandekalou: The Art and Soul of the Mande Griots I (Album as part of the griot collective Mandekalou)
- 2006: Mandekalou: The Art and Soul of the Mande Griots II (Album as part of the griot collective Mandekalou)
- 2007: Titati (Solo album)
- 2009: Sidiba (Solo album)
- 2010: Le guide de la révolution (Solo single)
