= Les Quatre Étoiles =

Les Quatre Etoiles was a Congolese musical group active from 1982 to 1996. They played the Soukous style of dance music, which gained widespread popularity in the 1980s and 1990s.

The members were Paris-based musicians Bopol Mansiamina (bass and rhythm guitar), Wuta Mayi (vocals), Syran Mbenza (lead guitar) and Nyboma (vocals). It was commonly called a "supergroup," since each of the four members of Les Quatre Etoiles had long established individual musical careers before joining forces.

== Band history ==
The band was formed in Paris in 1982, upon a request to Syran Mbenza from David Ouattara Moumouni, who produced their first album and released it on his Afro-Rythmes label, although they did not adopt Quatre Etoiles as the band's name until a year and a half later, when they recorded their second album in late 1983. The first album was recorded in late December 1982, and included one song by each of the four musicians.

When the group formed, each of its four members was a well-known and prolific musician. Based on its members’ negative experiences with bandleaders such as Franco and Tabu Ley Rochereau, Les Quatre Étoiles was a loose-knit arrangement rather than an exclusive one; during its existence, each of its members continued to release solo records, formed other bands, and played as sidemen in support of other musicians (notably including one another). As two of many examples, in 1988 Syran Mbenza formed another band, Kass Kass, with Passi Jo and Jean-Papy Ramazani, and all four members of Les Quatres Etoiles played on the 1995 album "Hello, Hello" by Mose Fan Fan and Somo Somo Ngobila.

The band also seemed to involve an egalitarian arrangement among the four members—for example, several of their albums contained four songs, one written by each band member. Finally, its lineup was flexible - a particular version of the band might be missing one member and/or include other African musicians.

Their polished renditions begin in the soukous tradition, with a slow, harmonious introduction; this then breaks out, again as in the soukous tradition, into a fast-paced chorus known as the sebene with resonating, repeated electric guitar rhythms in the background, interwoven with a choice assortment of African percussion instruments accompanied by orchestras.

Following the end of Les Quatre Etoiles in 1996, in 2000 three of its members (Syran Mbenza, Wuta Mayi, and Nyboma) joined other African musicians to form Kékélé.

The group reunited for at least two concerts in 2010; on June 20, 2010, they played the Afrika Festival Hertme, in the Netherlands, and on July 11, 2010 they played Bozar at Brussels, Belgium, in honor of the 50th anniversary of the independence of the Democratic Republic of the Congo.

== Discography ==
Although it is difficult to be complete in listing African recordings, from the discography compiled below it appears that they released seven studio albums and three live albums, although one of the three live albums may be a repackaged version of another.

Their album, Sangonini, was produced by the renowned African music producer Ibrahim Sylla. The song "Doly" enjoyed worldwide popularity, reaching No. 3 in the Colombian music charts. The song "Papy Sodolo", has been covered by Tabu Ley Rochereau, another African musician of note. Another song, "Sangonini", produced in Paris and released in 1993, has also been popular.

=== Albums ===
Title	Album Artist	Album details	Tracks (credits, as listed)
[Afro-Rhythmes Presente] 4 Grandes Vedettes de la Musique Africaine	4 Etoiles [this is on cover, but it might be the album name, given statement above that the band name was not chosen until later]	Release date: 1983; Label: Afro-Rthymes (Paris, France); Format: LP	Mayi (Wuta-May); Mama Iye-Ye (Nyboma); Zouzou (Syran); Maquereau (Bopol)
4 Stars [or (on record label) "4 Super Etoiles" or (first song) "Enfant Bamileke"]	Les Quatre Etoiles	Release date: 1984; Label: Syllart (Paris, France); Format: LP	Enfant Bamileke (Wuta May); Mawa Na Ngai (Syran); Luila (Bopol); Nvuna Chantal (Nyboma)
Dance	4 Stars / Etoiles	Release date: 1985; Label: Tangent (France), GEL (Brazil) (1987); Format: LP	Kabyby (Nyboma); Mayanga (Bopol); Ba Relations (Wuta Mayi); Kelele (Syran); 4 Stars (Nyboma, Bopol, Wuta Mayi, Syran)
6 Hits / 6 Tubes	Quatre Etoiles / 4 Stars	Release date: 1987; Produced by: Ibrahima Sylla; Label: Melodie/Syllart (Paris, France), CBS (Zimbabwe) (different title); Format: LP	Zunkuluke (Bopol); Omba (Nyboma); Veroda (Wuta Mayi); Samba (Nyboma); Manque d’occupation (Wuta Mayi); Makani (Syran)
Zairian Stars Show in the US - Kilimanjaro Heritage Hall	4 Stars	Release date: 1988; Label: Kilimanjaro Int'l Productions (Washington, DC, USA); Format: LP; Based on list of musicians on back cover, Nyboma was not with the band here.	Zairian Stars Show in the U.S.: Kouame / Elena / Ayant Droit / Tuti /Zou-Zou (Wuta-Mayi / Don Paolo / Syran M'Benza / Caesar A. Zarsah); Amerika (Blaise Mayanda [= Wuta Mayi]); Djina (Don Paolo [= Bopol]); Dovi Dina (Syran M'Benza)
Four Stars [also known as Kouame or Live]	Four Stars/Quatre Etoiles	Release date: 1989; Label: Four Stars Production; Format: LP; Live album from their 1988 US tour. (Based on similar track names, this may be a repackaging of the "Zairian Stars Show" album from Kilimanjaro.)	Kouamé; Héléna; Ayant droit; Tuti; Zouzou; Amerika; Djina; Ayite-Dovi
[Eti-Edan 1er Presente] Les 4 Etoiles [also known as Souffrance]	Les 4 Etoiles	Release date: 1991; Label: Celluloid (France); Format: LP	Souffrance; Nikuze; Tukina Kuetu; Tantine Oza; Adama; Mbono Ngomo
Sangonini	4 Etoiles	Release date: January 27, 1993; Label: Sterns (UK); Format: CD; Includes two tracks from Enfant Bamileke, all of 6 Tubes, plus new material.	Loi de la Nature; Coup de Fil; Doly; Papy Sodolo; Zunkuluke; Omba; Veroda; Samba; Manque d’occupation; Makani; Enfant Bamileke; Luila
Adama Coly	4 Etoiles	Release date: 1995; Label: Lusafrica (France); Format: CD	Alima (Syran Mbenza); Antho (Nyboma); Polygamie (Bopol – Mansiamina); Adama Coly (Wuta May); Nsangu Zimuangane (Bopol); Mimi Tenkolé (Wuta May); Samba Samba (Syran Mbenza); Zouzou (Syran Mbenza)
Live in London	Les Quatre Etoiles du Zaire	Release date: 1996; Label: Air B. Mas Production (Paris, France); Format: CD	Kabibi Maria; Youyou; Papy Sodolo; Doly; Loi de la Nature; Double Double; Zunguluke; Nina; Mado; Enfant Bamileke
