= Orchestre Bella Bella =

L'Orchestre Bella Bella (also known as Frères Soki & l'Orchestre Bella Bella or simply Bella Bella; sometimes written Bella-Bella) was a prominent DR Congo soukous band that formed in the early 1970s. It was led by the Soki brothers ("Les frères Soki" in French).

With Shama Shama and Lipwa Lipwa, it was one of the bands that popularized a smoother, softer style in the soukous scene. The band was a starting ground for many successful musicians, including Nyboma and Pepe Kalle.

== History ==
The band was founded in 1969 by the Soki brothers, Maxim and Emile Soki. Its lineup included guitarists Johnny Roger and Jean Bosco. Emile, who was only 16 when Bella Bella started, became a teen idol of the youth of Kinshasa. Since their early years, the band recorded several hits, such as Baboti bapekisi, Sylvie, Alexandrine, Mwasi ya moto, Luta, Lina, Mandendeli, Mbuta, Bipale ya pembeni, and Sofele.

Around 1972 the band experienced drastic changes in its lineup and internal quarrels, that eventually led to one the Soki brothers, Emile, leaving the band for a while to create a spin-off group called Bella Mambo. In the same period, Pepe Kalle joined Bella Bella for a few years, in order to earn the money he needed to buy instruments for his own band Empire Bakuba. Nyboma joined at the same time. With Kalle as a replacement for Emile, Bella Bella managed to keep their leading position in the soukous scene, with hits like Mbuta, Kamale, Kimbundi, Lipua Lipua and Sola.

In 1973 Emile quit Bella Mambo and rejoined his brother in Bella Bella. In the same year, the Soki brothers created their own recording label, Allez-y frères Soki, which released two major hits of their career, Bienvenue Doudou and Sentina. Both were written with the contribution of Dizzy Mandjeku. These two singles were incredibly successful, and brought several talented musicians to ask the Soki brothers to join in. These two singles were followed by a string of other hits (e.g., Mwana yoka toli, Menga, De base, Tikela ngai mobali, Pambindoni, Nganga, Houleux-houleux, Zamba). Eventually, the Soki brothers became so rich that they would sponsor other ensembles, one notable example being Papa Wemba's Viva La Musica.

In 1977, while the Soki brothers were on tour in Europe, Emile had health problems that would lead to a nervous breakdown and, eventually, to his definitive departure from the band. Maxime made several attempts at revitalizing the band, but several longtime members left between the late 1970s and the early 1980s. New entries (including, most notably, Kanda Bongo Man and Diblo Dibala) did not save the band from its decline. Maxime himself finally gave up Bella Bella and relocated in Germany.

== Partial discography ==
- Les plus grands succès de l'orchestre Bella Bella – vol. 1 (Ngoyarto NG 029)
- Les plus grands succès de l'orchestre Bella Bella – vol. 2 (Ngoyarto NG 030)
- Les plus grands succès de l'orchestre Bella Bella – vol. 3 (Ngoyarto NG 031)
- Les plus grands succès de l'orchestre Bella Bella – vol. 4 (Ngoyarto NG 032)
- Les plus grands succès de l'orchestre Bella Bella: The serie single fetish (Ngoyarto NG 049)
- La naissance de l'Orchestre Bella Bella: Jamais de la Vie (Ngoyarto NG092)
- Les plus grands succès de l'Orchestre Bella Bella: Nono (Ngoyarto NG093)
- Les plus grands succès de l'Orchestre Bella Bella: Sola & Sofele (Ngoyarto NG094)
- Les plus grands succès de l'Orchestre Bella Bella: Muana Yoka Toli (Ngoyarto NG095)
- Les plus grands succès de l'Orchestre Bella Bella & les frères Soki – vol. 5 (Ngoyarto NG096)
- Bella Bella des Freres Soki 1970/1973 (Sonodisc CD 36541)
- Frères Soki & Bella Bella 1970/1975 (Sonodisc CD 36602)
- L'Afrique danse avec l'Orchestre Bella Bella & Soki Vangu (Sonodisc 1976)
- Compilation Orchestres de la generation "Bella-Bella" (VVAA compilation, Sonodisc CD 36532)
- Jeunes Orchestres Zaïrois (VVAA compilation, Sonodisc CD 36517)
