= Kékélé =

Congolese band

Kekele was a band formed in 2000, composed of leading veteran African musicians, mostly from the Democratic Republic of the Congo. They played Congolese rumba in a revival style harkening back to the 1950s, 60s, and 70s, using acoustic guitars. Kekele seems to be dormant or defunct, having not released a recording since 2006 nor performed since (apparently) 2010.

== Origins ==
The African-record producer Ibrahim Sylla formed Kekele in 2000 to record its first album, Rumba Congo. According to one report, the band was originally intended as a "one-off" effort, only meant to exist for that one album. The word kekele in the Lingala language means a type of fibrous vine, sometimes woven together to make rope. One writer speculated that this is a metaphor for the musicians who comprise the band.

The band's inspiring spirit was a dissatisfaction with the direction Congolese popular music had recently taken, and a desire to return to its roots. As Kekele guitarist Syran Mbenza said, "There were no more songs, no more melodies. . . . Our music was becoming decadent. We had to wake it up again."

As an effort by a group of older musicians to revive an older style of music, many writers compared this group's work to the Buena Vista Social Club, the 1990s Havana band and album. Perhaps along similar lines to the Buena Vista Social Club, Kekele seems aimed at a largely non-African target audience; Martin Sinnock, a U.K. expert in Congolese music, described Kekele's first album as "the most popular Congolese release of 2001"—among those "[o]utside the African community," because African fans of Congolese music were more interested in other musicians such as Koffi Olomide.

== Personnel ==
As Kekele has recorded and toured, its membership, the ten to twenty musicians in the studio or on stage, has regularly changed. Each lineup, however, has consistently been an all-star cast of experienced musicians, most from the Democratic Republic of the Congo but some from elsewhere in Africa.

The consistent core members of Kekele include vocalists Nyboma (Nyboma Mwan'dido), Wuta Mayi, Bumba Massa, and Loko 'Djeskain' Massengo, and guitarist Syran Mbenza. Loko 'Djeskain' Massengo is from the Republic of the Congo, while the other four are from the Democratic Republic of the Congo, and all were between age 50 and 55 in 2001. These five core members of Kekele include three of the four "stars" who comprised the supergroup Les Quatre Etoiles (The Four Stars): Nyboma, Wuta Mayi, and Syran Mbenza.

== History: personnel changes, musical styles, critical reactions ==
=== First album, Rumba Congo (2001) ===
The first iteration of Kekele was led by the older guitarist Papa Noël Nedule as music director, and included, in addition to the five core members named above, Jean-Papy Ramazani (vocals), Yves Ndjock of Cameroon (guitar), Sungu Debat (conga), and Viviane Arnoux of France (accordion).

By contrast to the increasingly fast, electronic Congolese music of the 1990s, the album's musical style was a throwback, with slow rumba tempos, acoustic guitars, and accordion. Reviewers noted the high quality of the musicians and the slow, smooth nature of the music. For example, Mark Romano wrote, "Here is the full glory of Congolese rumba, played with style and an elegant sensuality that is without equal in the world of African music. . . . There is no filler here, only unguent guitar work, honey-laced vocals, piping-hot percussion, and tight fat horns." Christina Roden wrote, "The tunes uniformly reflect the languid yet well-marked Cuban clavé beat, chiming strings, and close-harmony vocals that characterized the older, more classic styles. There is not a single rough edge or hurried tempo within earshot. Ultimately, the project comes across as a mellifluous living history taught by those who know." Rock critic Robert Christgau wrote "As long on lilt as it is devoid of drive, the abiding quietude is irrelevant to an up-and-at-'em mood. But when nothing seems sweeter than home, it's a blessed comfort--the harmonies whispering, the drums twining, the groove massaging each overtaxed muscle until the blood can do its work there and flow on."

The album was critically well-received. Christgau gave the record an A−, and Romano concluded "It would be difficult to top this recording for Congolese rumba album of the year or, for that matter, African album of the year."

=== Second album, Congo Life (2003) ===
Papa Noël was ill when the second Kekele album was recorded, and did not participate. He was replaced on guitar by Rigo Star Bamundélé. Ramazani and Ndjock also did not return for the second album.

Similar to the first album, the second featured acoustic guitars and slow conga rhythms. Differently, it added flute, clarinet, and violin. It includes a tribute to OK Jazz, Souvenirs-OK-Jazz. Reviewers again focused on the record's beauty. John Armstrong, for BBC Music, described the album's "[d]elicious melodies, inspired and original arrangements, faultless and non-indulgent playing, scalp-tingling voices." The album's song composed by Rigo Star, Oyibi Bien, was singled out by two reviewers as particularly outstanding.

Christgau preferred the first album over the second, but other reviewers felt differently. Rick Sanders of fRoots magazine wrote "here, a couple of years down the line, comes number two, an album that shows even more warmth, wit and soul than its predecessor." John Pareles wrote in the New York Times, "Kekele is an alliance of musicians who have played in some of Congo's best-known bands, and on "Congo Life" (World Music), they feature acoustic instruments—guitars, woodwinds, marimbas—in pristinely recorded soukous that's no less danceable for its gentle arrangements."

=== Third album, Kinavana (2006) ===
Papa Noël returned for the third album, on which Kekele was joined by saxophonist Manu Dibango, from Cameroon, and singers Mbilia Bel and Madilu System, both from the Democratic Republic of the Congo.

The title of the third album refers to an imaginary place, a combination of Kinshasa (Democratic Republic of the Congo), and Havana (Cuba). The album explores the connections between Congolese and Cuban rumba music. In Kinavana, the band takes songs written or performed by the Cuban songwriter Guillermo Portabales, and plays them in a Congolese style, replacing their Spanish lyrics with Lingala ones.

Band member Nyboma has pointed out that Cuban rumba — both the word and the dance -- derives from the Congolese nkumba, with the Spanish "r" added to the word, and that it was brought from Congo to Cuba in the transatlantic slave trade. When Congolese rumba developed after World War II, it was heavily influenced by Cuban music. Thus, Kinavana incorporates at least three successive cultural crossings of the Atlantic—music and dance from Congo combining with other influences to become Cuban rumba, that same Cuban music then contributing to the Congolese rumba, and then bringing the music of Portabales into Congolese music for Kinavana.

This album also received positive reviews. Norman Weinstein wrote for All About Jazz: "This music sounds effortless, joyous, free of contrivance, and even for ears steeped mainly in jazz, intensely swinging. This is not just the best African album I've heard in years; it's superior to most of the world music releases that I've heard lately, from any place. What a case for how age can bring a perfect blend of musical seasonings".

== Live performances ==
Between their first concert tour, ten or eleven performances in the UK in November–December 2001, and what appears to be their most recent concert, a July 9, 2010 show at Bozar in Brussels, one source reports that Kekele toured the United States and Canada in summer 2004 and summer 2006, and Europe in summer 2005 and summer 2007, as well as performing in the Canary Islands, Réunion, Guadeloupe, the Dominican Republic, Morocco, and Congo Brazzaville. Additionally, their 2006 live album is described as being recorded "during Kekele's 2005 winter tour in Canada and the U.S."

An incomplete list of reviewed or noteworthy performances include the following:

- Band on the Wall, Manchester, UK (shortly before 27 November 2001)
- Bataclan, Paris (opening for Africando) (15 November 2003)
- Skirball Center, New York (1 May 2004)
- Central Park Summerstage, New York (opening for Thomas Mapfumo) (11 July 2004)
- HotHouse, Chicago (28 July 2004)
- Grant Park, Chicago (29 July 2004)
- Concert de bienfaisance "CONGO-Rythmes et rumba", UNESCO, Paris (23 September 2004)
- San Francisco Bay area, California (3 July 2006)
- Kennedy Center Millennium Stage, Washington, D.C. (4 August 2006)
- Celebrate Brooklyn African Festival, New York (5 August 2006)
- Tempo Latino Festival, Vic-Fezensac, France (26 July 2007)

== Discography ==
Rumba Congo

- Released: 2001
- Format: CD
- Label: Sterns Africa
- Producer: Ibrahim Sylla
- Tracks: "Mbote Ya Pamba" (Syran Mbenza), "Dido" (Nyboma Mwan Dido), "Mandze Mandze" (Loko Massengo), "Baninga" (Papa Noël Nedule), "Elembetele Lala" (Jean-Papy Ramazani), "Massamour" (Bumba Massa), "Pinzoli Ya Africa" (Wuta Mayi), "Kubola" (Loko Massengo), "Patenge" (Jean-Papy Ramazani), "Gina" (Nyboma Mwan Dido), "Kaka Ngai" (Bumba Massa), "Success Ya Grand Kalle" (Joseph Kabasele), "Otage Ya Bolingo" (Wuta Mayi), "Likambo" (Yves Ndjock)

Congo Life

- Released: 2003
- Format: CD
- Label: Sterns Africa
- Tracks: "Delali", "Lolita", "Issake Shango", "Affaire Mokuwa", "Bebe Yaourt", "Nakobala Te", "Mandoyi", "Lili", "Souvenirs-Ok-Jazz", "Oyebi Bien", "Silence"

Kinavana

- Released: 2006
- Format: CD
- Label: Sterns Africa, Syllart
- Producer: Ibrahim Sylla
- Tracks: "Mace", "Tokobaka Mikuwa", "Tapale", "Ponton La Belle", "Ba Kristo", "Fungola Motema", "Yo Odeconer", "Yoka Biso", "Oh Miguel", "Tubela", "Chérie Sandra", "Consequence"

Live: Tournée Américaine & Canadienne

- Released: 2006
- Format: CD
- Label: Kekele [self-published]
- Tracks: "Baninga", "Lili", "Delali", "Dido", "Lolita", "Affaire Mokuwa", "Mandoyi", "Mandze-Mandze", "Kubola", "Massamour"
