= Nyboma =

Congolese musician (born 1952)

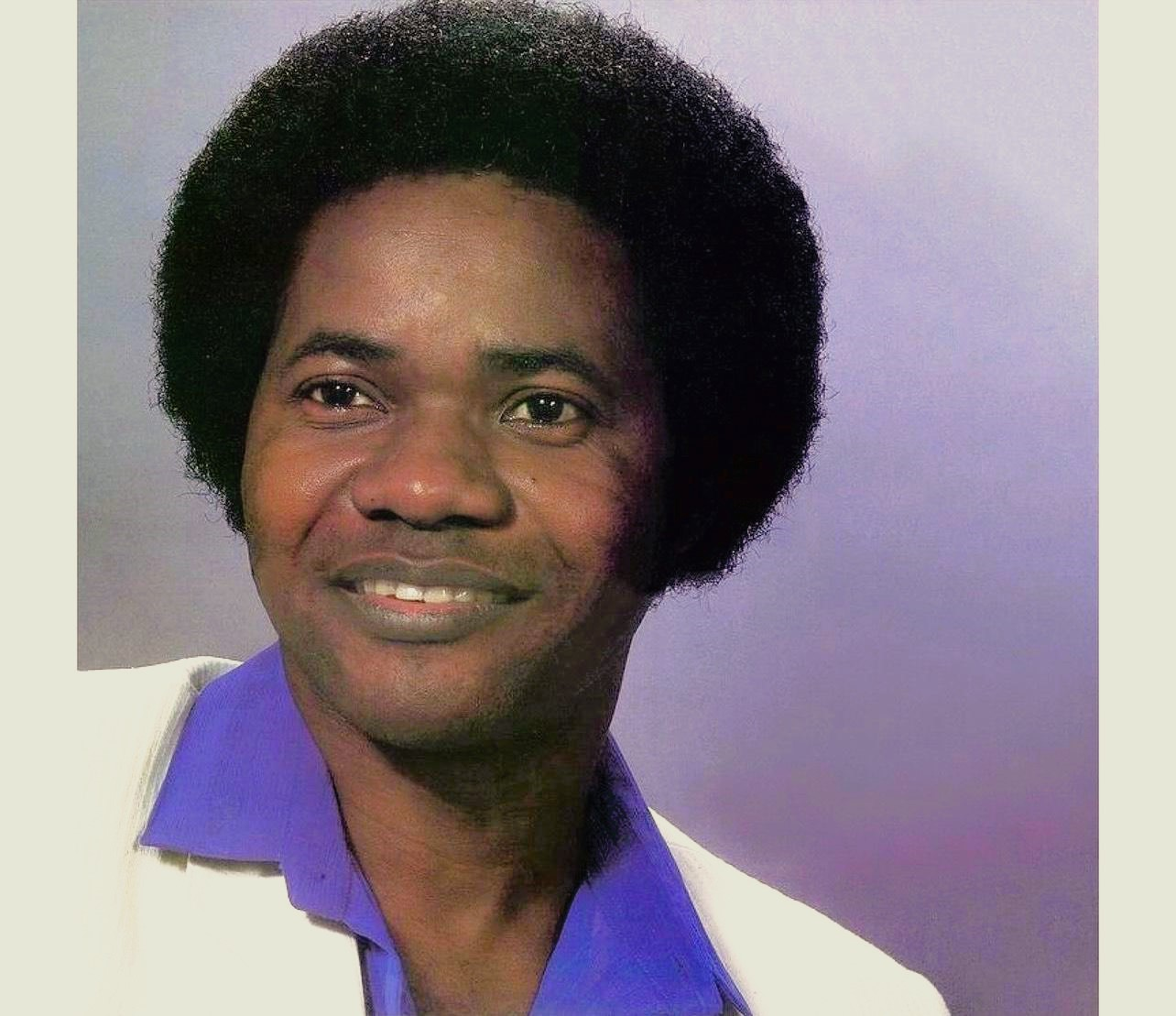
- Nyboma in 1973

Background information
- Born: Nyboma Mwan'dido; December 24, 1952 (age 73); Léopoldville (now Kinshasa, Belgian Congo (modern-day Democratic Republic of the Congo)
- Origin: Congolese
- Genres: soukous
- Occupations: Vocalist; songwriter; record producer
- Instruments: Guitar vocals
- Years active: 1960s–present

Nyboma Mwan'dido (or Muan'dido), often simply Nyboma (born 1952), a prominent Congolese soukous tenor vocalist, has been over a fifty-year span a leading member of several outstanding bands, including Orchestre Bella Bella, Orchestre Lipua Lipua, Orchestre Kamale, Les Quatre Étoiles, and Kékélé, in addition to performing and recording as a solo artist. He is widely recognized as one of the best singers in Congolese music.

== Biography ==
=== 1952-1970: Early years and first bands: Baby National and Negro Succès ===
Nyboma was born on 24 December 1952 in Nioki, a river town 200 km northeast of the capital of what at the time was the Belgian Congo, later the Republic of the Congo and Zaire, and is now the Democratic Republic of Congo. He learned to sing as a child in Nioki, in the church choir. He sang in the school chorus when his family moved to Kinshasa while he was still in primary school.

Early bands that Nyboma joined were l'Orchestre Baby National and Orchestre Negro Succès, although sources differ on the order and his age when he joined them. According to one source, at the age of 16 he began singing with Negro Succès. According to other sources, he quit his job as apprentice electrician to join his first band, Baby National, as a professional singer in 1969 at the age of eighteen and he later moved to Negro Succès. He left the latter band when its co-leader, Bavon Marie-Marie, Franco's brother, died in 1970.

=== 1970s: Work with Verckys: Bella Bella, Lipua Lipua, Orchestre Kamale, Les Kamale ===
He then signed with the Editions Veve record label owned by Verckys Kiamuangana Mateta (a soukous recording artist and producer/financier, composer, saxophonist, and band leader in the Democratic Republic of the Congo). He joined the band Orchestre Bella Bella, led by the Soki brothers, in 1972, when it was part of Verckys's stable of artists, until 1973 when its founders left Verckys and Editions Veve. In 1972 Bella Bella's record Mbuta, with Nyboma, was considered the song of the year. Another of Bella Bella's records was called Lipua Lipua, for which Nyboma named his next band in a pattern that continued to the following band.

In 1973 with other musicians from Bella Bella including Pepe Kalle, Nyboma formed the band Orchestre Lipua Lipua, also referred to as Lipwa Lipwa, (another band under Verckys's Editions Vévé label), which he sang with until his departure in 1975. "Lipua Lipua" means confusion or disorder. He sang on Orchestre Lipua Lipua's first release in April 1973, the hit "Kamale," which was considered the song of the year in 1973; reportedly that name came from a friend of Nyboma's attempt to pronounce the French word "camarade." In 1975 Nyboma and other members left Lipua Lipua to form Orchestre Kamale; Lipua Lipua continued to perform and record under guitarist "Professor" Vata Mombasa, who had joined in 1974.

In 1975 he became the leader of Orchestre Kamale, under the Editions Veve record label; the group was established by Verckys using some members of Orchestre Lipua Lipua. Orchestre Kamale disbanded in 1978 when Assosa and Mulembu left to create Fuka Fuka. The Orchestre Kamale vestige was renamed Les Kamale with Nyboma at the helm. In the 1970s, Les Kamale was a popular danceband with their hits "Salanga" and "Afida na ngai."

=== 1979-present: West Africa and Paris - solo work, collaborations, Les Quatre Etoiles, Kékélé ===
In 1979 Nyboma was drafted by Dizzy Mandjeku, along with guitarist Dally Kimoko, from Les Kamale into a version of the African All-Stars in Lomé, Togo, after the band's founder Sam Mangwana had left with another version of that band.

In 1981 Nyboma moved to Abidjan, Côte d'Ivoire, where he recorded one of his biggest hits “Double Double” with his new band which he named Les Kamale Dynamiques Du Zaire. In 1982, he moved to Paris, where he has lived since, except for a period in the United States in the 1990s. The supergroup Les Quatre Etoiles which he founded with three other leading soukous musicians, Bopol, Syran Mbenza, and Wuta Mayi, recorded and toured from 1982 to 1996. The group was a loose arrangement that allowed its four members to pursue their own projects while they were members of Les Quatre Etoiles. In 1983–84, he recorded another three albums under the name Les Kamale Dynamiques Du Zaire.

In the late 1980s Nyboma also joined Pepe Kalle, his old bandmate from Bella Bella and Lipua Lipua, on two records produced by Ibrahima Sylla, Zouke Zouke and Moyibi (meaning "thief"), in a combination contrasting "Pépé Kallé's earthy baritone voice with Nyboma's airy tenor." Nyboma's 1995 album Anicet was also produced by Sylla, whose signature is evident from the polished, multi-layered songs in the album—including a song in which Nyboma pays tribute to Malcolm X (in a song of the same title) and to Pan-Africanism in a song entitled Abissina.

In a 1990s interview with the journalist Gary Stewart, Nyboma expressed unhappiness with the African music then being made in Paris as being commercial, and lacking feeling: "Commercial music is appreciated here [in Paris]. Because here you don't put in a lot of words. You just put in music that goes, Boom! Boom! Boom! Boom! Boom! To sell it, just to sell it." He similarly complained to Georges Collinet, who was interviewing him for a 1996 radio program, about the state of Congolese music being made in Paris in the 1990s, saying, "Singers should get back to the basics, beautiful melodies and highly tuned voices." Perhaps with these sentiments in mind, in 2000 he formed the acoustic throwback group Kékélé, with another group of outstanding musicians.

== Assessments ==
Over the course of his career, Nyboma has worked with many Congolese musical greats, from Pepe Kalle and others in Empire Bakuba, to Koffi Olomide, Madilu System, Lokassa Ya Mbongo, and his counterparts in Les Quatre Etoiles: Bopol, Syran and Wuta Mayi.

Critical assessments of Nyboma's singing all include superlative comparisons and descriptions with high praise, such as, "he is possessed of the finest tenor voice in Africa," "There are a handful of Congolese singers: Franco, Nyboma, Sam Mangwana, Papa Wemba, who have unmistakable and magical voices, capable of transporting you with a few notes," "Nyboma's high, sweet-as-honey voice soaring above exuberant guitar and bass," "One of the great singers of Congolese music, Nyboma's tenor voice is airy, effortless and supple," and "one of the great African voices."

== Discography ==
The following is based on several sources.

=== Solo records (or as band leader) ===
- Les Editions Vévé présentent l'Orchestre Kamale & son célèbre chanteur Nyomba (or Ayindjo) (1977)
- Double Double (1981) [back cover credits L'Orchestre les Kamale]
- DeDe (or De De) (Nyboma & Les Kamale Dynamiques) (1982)
- Pepe (Nyboma & Les Kamale Dynamiques du Zaire) (1983)
- Coeur a Coeur (Nyboma & Kamale Dynamique) (1983)
- Bandona (Nyboma & Les Kamale) (1985)
- Anicet (1995)
- Kanta d'Or (2020)
- Live au Cabaret Sauvage (2020)

==== Compilations ====
- La Voix Danos Canta - Vol. 1/3 1971-1974 Le Mérite De La Musique Congolaise (1995 or 1998) [CD from Glenn Music; with songs of Kamale (actually later than 1974–1975)]
- La Voix Danos Canta - Vol. 2/3 1972-1974 Le Mérite De La Musique Congolaise (1995 or 1998) [CD from Glenn Music; with songs of Lipua Lipua]
- La Voix Danos Canta - Vol. 3/3 1974-1975 Le Mérite De La Musique Congolaise (1995 or 1998) [CD from Glenn Music; with songs of various bands]
- Lipwa Lipwa De Nyboma (1997) [CD from Sonodisc]
- Kamale & Lipwa Lipwa (1997) [CD from Sonodisc; Nyboma not named on cover, which says "Lipwa Mipwa"]
- Nyboma & Kamale Dynamique (2005) [CD from Sterns; two tracks from each of Double Double, DeDe, Pepe, Coeur a Couer, and Bandona]
- Verckys presente Nyboma, La Voix Qui Console (2015) [digital release from Sterns of 1973-75 Lipua Lipua singles)

=== Featured with other artists ===
- Innovation, vol. 6 (Nyboma & Bovi) (1980)
- Innovation, vol. 7 (Nyboma & Bovi) (1981)
- Innovation, vol. 8 (Nyboma & Bovi & Kilalo) (1982)
- Deception Motema (Bopol Mansiamina & Nyboma Mwan'Dido) (1984)
- Pepe Kalle & Nyboma (or Zouke Zouke or Empire Bakuba: Pepe Kalle & Nyboma) (1986)
- Tabu Ley, Sacramento avec Canta Nyboma (1986)
- Moyibi (Pepe Kalle & Nyboma) (1988)
- Stop Feu Rouge - Voisin (Nyboma & Madilu) (1989 or 1990)
- Hommage À Emoro (Les Etoiles du Zaire: Pepe Kalle, Nyboma, Bopol) (1992)

=== As a band member ===
- Orchestre Lipua Lipua, [singles, 1973-75]
- Orchestre Kamale, [singles, 1975-78]
- Les Kamale, [singles, 1978-79]
- Les Kamale, Les Kamale (1979) [Sonafric SAF 50.087]
- Les Kamale, Les Kamale (1979) [Sonafric SAF 61.012; these two albums with identical titles and very similar cover art are different.]
- Orchestre African All Stars International, Vol. 2 (early 1980s)
- Orchestre African All Stars International, Vol. 3 (early 1980s)
- Les Quatre Étoiles, 4 Grandes Vedettes de la Musique Africaine (1983)
- Les Quatre Étoiles, 4 Stars (or Enfant Bamileke) (1984)
- Les Quatre Étoiles, Dance (1985)
- Les Quatre Étoiles, 6 Hits / 6 Tubes (1987)
- Les Quatre Étoiles, Zairian Stars Show in the US - Kilimanjaro Heritage Hall (1988, live)
- Les Quatre Étoiles, Four Stars (or Kouame) (1989, live) [may be same as Kilimanjaro live album]
- Les Quatre Étoiles, Les 4 Etoiles (or Souffrance) (1991)
- Les Quatre Étoiles, Sangonini (1993)
- Les Quatre Étoiles, Adama Coly (1995)
- Les Quatre Étoiles, Live in London (1996, live)
- Soukouss Force One, Asipo (1998)
- Kékélé, Rumba Congo (2001)
- Kékélé, Congo Life (2003)
- Kékélé, Kinavana (2006)
- Kékélé, Live: Tournée Américaine & Canadienne (2006)

=== As a supporting artist ===
[This is a representative sample; there could be dozens, if not hundreds, of disks on this list.]

- Bopol Mansiamina, Manuela (1983)
- Koffi Olomide, Rue d'Amour (1987)
- Koffi Olomide Golden Star, Elle Et Moi (1989)
- Pepe Kalle, Gérant (1991)
- Syran Mbenza, Symbiose (1991)
- Madilu System, Sans Commentaire (1993)
- Mose Fan Fan and Somo Somo, Hello Hello (1995)
- Diblo Dibala, Pas Moi (1999)
- Mbilia Bel, Welcome (2001)
- Samba Mapangala and Orchestre Virunga, Song & Dance (2006)
- Wuta Mayi, La Face Cachée (2019)

== See also ==
- Music of the Democratic Republic of the Congo
