= Bopol Mansiamina =

Congolese musician (1949–2021)

- Born: Paul Mansiamina Mfoko; 26 July 1949; Kinshasa, DR Congo
- Died: 7 November 2021 (aged 72) Paris, France
- Genre: Soukous
- Occupation: Guitarist
- Years active: 1969–2010s
- Formerly of: Les Quatre Etoiles · Nyboma Mwan'dido · Wuta Mayi · Syran Mbenza

Bopol Mansiamina (26 July 1949 – 7 November 2021), also known as Bopol or Don Paolo, was a prolific and renowned Congolese musician (bass player, guitar player most commonly as a rhythm guitarist, vocalist, composer, and producer). He recorded and performed extensively over four decades as a solo artist, as a member of leading African bands, and in support of many African musicians. Bopol was best known for his work in the 1980s and early 1990s as one of the four members of the Paris-based supergroup Les Quatre Etoiles (the 4 Stars) and as a solo artist.

== Career and history ==
=== Early life ===
Mansiamina was born 26 July 1949, in Leopoldville (now Kinshasa, Democratic Republic of the Congo) as Paul Mansiamina Mfoko (or M'Foko Mansiamina).

=== 1969 to c.1980: Zaire, Cote d'Ivoire, Togo ===
From 1969 to 1978 Bopol was based in Zaire and played in a series of bands. He joined many of the leading Congolese musicians of the past and next generations. After that time, he moved to West Africa for a few years.

After completing secondary school, in 1969 he joined Orchestre Bamboula (led by Papa Noël and also including Madilu System; Pepe Kalle; Bozi Boziana; and Wuta Mayi, then known as Blaise Pasco, with whom Bopol would work for decades). Orchestre Bamboula was chosen to represent Zaire in the 1969 Festival of African Music in Algeria. The band broke up, however, shortly after its return from Algiers.

After that Bopol led a revival of Orchestre Rock-a-Mambo. He then joined Dr Nico's African Fiesta Sukisa in 1970. In 1971 he co-founded Orchestre [or L'Orchestre or Orchestra] Continental, which included Blaise Pasco (later Wuta Mayi), and Josky. From 1973 to 1976 he joined Afrisa, led by Tabu Ley. Another report, however, says that Bopol and Wuta Mayi joined Franco and TPOK Jazz from 1974. In 1975, Bopol and Wuta had a joint band, or "activity," called Orchestre Mamumay, which released at least two records. In 1976 he started the group Ya Toupas, with Ray Lema and Félix Manuaku Waku. Ya Toupas either supported or included the singer M'pongo Love. Bopol continued to work musically with her until her death in 1990. For example, Bopol played rhythm guitar on her 1987 album Partager, and three of its six songs (including the title track) were written by him.

In 1978 he moved to West Africa - Lome, Togo, and Abidjan, Cote d'Ivoire - and joined Sam Mangwana's African All-Stars. Other Congolese musicians in that band included Syran Mbenza, Ringo Moya, and many others. The original version of that band only lasted about a year, though, then split in two, with one group (including Mangwana, Bopol, and Syran Mbenza) moving to Abidjan, and another staying in Lome.

=== 1980s and early 1990s: Paris ===
In 1980, Bopol began recording as a solo artist. What some may consider to be his first solo albums are not labelled as such: they are three of the series of eight albums released under the name Orchestre Mode Succes, Innovations (vols. 1-8). Volumes 1, 3, and 4 in that series feature Bopol and Baba Ley Assaka. By 1982 Bopol was living in Paris and recording solo albums. That year he formed Les Quatre Étoiles (the Four Stars), with Wuta Mayi, Nyboma, and Syran Mbenza. Les Quatre Etoiles played together as a band, but also served as a core group of talented musicians who often played on each other's records, and those of other artists—as is evident from Bopol's discography during the 1980s. He recorded and performed with that band, as a solo artist, and in support of other artists through the 1980s and early 1990s. On some of his records, the producer or a songwriter is listed as Don Paolo, another name for Bopol.

=== Recent years ===
By 1996, Bopol was living in the United States. Georges Collinet reported on an edition of his radio program Afropop Worldwide devoted to Les Quatre Etoiles, "After more than ten years living in France, Bopol and Nyboma have now come to the US, looking for a new base, because they say that in America, business is business, while in France, people are always looking at the color of your skin." Collinet continued, translating from his interview in French with Bopol for the program, "Bopol says, if there were good studios in Zaire I would prefer to work there, because there I have lots of inspiration -- you can see what people are doing. We compose our songs by observing people around us. In Europe it's very difficult; you have a different life."

Between 2000 and 2010, Bopol recorded and toured with other artists, notably Samba Mapangala's band, Virunga, and Ricardo Lemvo.

=== Death ===
Bopol died on 7 November 2021, at his home in Paris, of a stroke.

== Evaluations ==
Bopol contributed to much of the Congolese soukous music made during its 1980s and 90s. His best work may be that from the early 1980s. "Manuela" is recognized among his outstanding tracks.

Much of his music is recognized as being highly danceable, although somewhat repetitive. Some of his songs - such as "Pitie, Je Veux La Reconciliation", "Samedi Soir", "Bety Bety" - were common staples on many 1980s dance floors around the world.

On his solo recordings, he consistently surrounded himself with stellar musicians. The guitar interplay between Bopol and his frequent collaborator, Syran Mbenza, has been described as "legendary."

== Discography ==
=== Solo albums ===
Title	Date	Label	Tracks	Notes
The Original Innovation, Deception Motema	1981?	Star Musique (USA) (SMP 6011)	"Déception Motema"; "Cardiaque ya l'amour"; "Issa Touré"; "Papy Ozonga"	With Nyboma, Dally Kimoko. Tracks may be listed in wrong order.
Maillot Jaune (Bopol Mansiamina & Besisimou)	1982	Editions Tina (Zaire) (MAR 100)	"Maillot Jaune"; "Because No Money"; "Bety Bety"; "Zola Zola"	With Syran Mbenza
Mariage Forcé	1982	Star (Cote d'Ivoire) (SHA 021), Sacodis (France) (LDS 21/001) (1983)	"Mariage Forcé"; "Yenga Yenga"; "Kala Ye Ngangu"; "Ye A Bouger"	
Manuela	1983	Syllart (France) (SYL 8301)	"Manuela"; "Controleur"; "Choisi"; "Bameli Pena"; "Bonjour Le Soleil"	With Syran Mbenza, Nyboma, Wuta Mayi
Bopol (a/k/a/ "Samedi Soir" or "Afric'Ambiance")	1984	Syllart (France) (SYL 8305)	"Samedi Soir"; "Madela"; "Afric' Ambiance"; "Muana Samba"	With Syran Mbenza, Ray Lema, Jean Papy
Helena (12" single) (Bopol & Innovation)	1984	Syllart (France) (SYL 8310)	Helena; Oh! Motema	With Daly Kimoko, Jacob Desvarieux, Syran Mbenza, Wuta Mayi
Bopol Mansiamina (a/k/a "Ca C'est Quoi")	1985	Celluloid (CEL 6749)	"Ça c'est quoi?"; "Mu Karame"; "Makwandungu"; "Patience"; "Maizo"	With Wuta Mayi, Jean-Papi, Dally Kimoko
Serrez Ceinture	1987	Syllart (France) (SYL 8320)	Serrez ceinture; Moi pas confiance; Houle Muke Kuela Ngue; Cousin cousine; Motema mo vire	
Bopol	1988	Syllart (France) (BM 004) Bleu Caraibes (France) 82426-1	Dada Micha; Yo Mukarame; Yo Mukarame (remix); Ce Le; Samala; Cheri Coco (A.B.C)	Zouk record
Belinda	1989	Syllart (France) (SYL 8397)	Belinda; M.F.A.; Nzungu Yakala Instrumental; Fausta Mare; Afrinight; Nzungu Yakala; (CD version with "3 titres bonus" adds three tracks from Serrez Ceinture)	
Innovation	1991 (or 1990)	B.M. Productions (BM 005)	Dienaba; Misère; Aida (instrumental); Aida; Yembele Yembele	With Nyboma, Dally Kimoko
Koumbe Trahison	1992	Afro-Rythmes (France) (20611, AR 1023)	Bouchira; Bamako Night; Mahele (Mix); Afric Antilles; Koumbe Trahison; Mahele (Instrumental)	
Akuna Matata	1997	H&R Ents. (HR2243)	Mama Afrika (Paris Mix); Misere; Caresse Moin R.A.; M'Bongi; Isabella "Akuna Matata"; Mukarame "La Rumba"; Maweke Weke; La Vie; Ati Kayla; Aidara; Djeneba; Mama Africa (LA Mix)	

=== Compilations ===
Title	Date	Label	Tracks
Greatest Hits	?	Serengeti (SER129)	Pitie, Je Veux La Reconciliation; Ca C'Est Quoi?; Afric' Ambiance; Samedi Soir; Because No Money; Muana Samba
The Very Best of Bopol	1998	H&R Enterprises (Irving, Texas, USA) (HR 2561)	Jalousie; Belinda; Fausta Mare; Bouchira; Bamako Night; Marie Jeanne Innovation; Pitie Je Veux; Makwadungu; Choisi; Controleur

=== Featured among other artists ===
Title	Album Artist	Date	Label	Tracks	Notes
Innovation, vol. 1	Orchestre Mode Succes, Baba Ley Assaka, Bopol Mansiamina	1980	(INLP 001)	"Pitié, Je Veux La Réconciliation", "Le Lycée", "Bibiche Oyambaka Ngaï", "Titina"	
Innovation, vol. 3	Orchestre Mode Succes, Baba Ley Assaka, Bopol Mansiamina	1980	(INLP 003)	"Tu m'as déçu, Marie-Jeanne"; "Diffamation Ya Nini?"; "Naboyi Amour na sense unique"; "Mystère de Popol"	
Innovation, vol. 4	Orchestre Mode Succes, Baba Ley Assaka, Bopol Mansiamina	1981	(INLP 004)	"Nabeli Maladie Ya Tension"; "Je Peux Attraper Hypertension"; "Elisa Kina Kimbwa"; "Contre Temps"	
Deception Motema	Bopol Mansiamina & Nyboma Mwan'Dido	1984	Overseas Records (Japan)	Deception Motema; Cardiaque Ya L'Amour; Issa Toure Muana Sokode; S. S. Sans Souci	
The Best African Sound a/k/a "Sambela"	Bopol Mansiamina & Syran Mbenza	1987	PG Production (France) (PG 87101)	Sambela; Marie Jeanne; Reviens Moussa; Mokili; Africa Diaspora	With Sam Mangwana, Teo Blaise
Hommage À Emoro	Les Etoiles du Zaire—Pepe Kalle, Nyboma, Bopol	1992	Syllart (France) (38117-1)	Pardon Faina; Moussa Hypocrite; Pembe; Amba	

=== As a band member ===
- Orchestre Continental, Les Grands Succes de l'Orchestre Continental (1975, compiling singles from c. 1972)
- Tabu Ley, The Voice of Lightness, CD2, tracks 1-8 (Afrisa International tracks)
- Orchestre Mamumay, "Luila" / "Beaux parents" (1975)
- Orchestre Mamumay, "Mamy Zola" / "Mayanda" (1975)
- Les Ya Toupas du Zaïre, Vol. 1 - Je Ne Bois Pas Beaucoup (1976)
- Orchestre Les Ya Tupa's [sic] (with Mpongo Love), Ndaya (1977)
- Les Ya Toupas du Zaïre, Les Ya Toupas du Zaïre (1978)
- Sam Mangwana & African All-Stars, vol. 1 (or "Matinda") (1979)
- Les Quatre Etoiles, 4 Grandes Vedettes de la Musique Africaine (1983)
- Les Quatre Etoiles, 4 Stars (or "Enfant Bamileke") (1984)
- Les Quatre Etoiles, Dance (1985)
- Les Quatre Etoiles, 6 Hits / 6 Tubes (1987)
- Les Quatre Etoiles, Zairian Stars Show in the US - Kilimanjaro Heritage Hall (1988, live)
- Les Quatre Etoiles, Four Stars (or "Kouame") (1989, live)
- Les Quatre Etoiles, Les 4 Etoiles (or "Souffrance") (1991)
- Les Quatre Etoiles, Sangonini (1993)
- Les Quatre Etoiles, Adama Coly (1995)
- Les Quatre Etoiles, Live in London (1996)

=== As a supporting artist ===
Bopol has played on certainly dozens, and probably hundreds, of other artists' records. This lists only some of them.

- Wuta Mayi, Le Beach (1980s)
- Nyboma, Doublé Doublé (1982)
- Nyboma & Les Kamale Dynamiques, Dé Dé (1982)
- Nyboma Et Les Kamale Dynamiques Du Zaire, Aïcha Motema (1983)
- Mpongo Love, Safari Sound (1983)
- Mpongo Love, Partager (1987)
- Syran Mbenza with the best of Paris, Symbiose (1990 or 1991)
- Nyboma, Anicet (1994)
- Sam Mangwana, Maria Tebbo (1995)
- Mose Fan Fan & Somo Somo, Hello Hello (1995)
- Ricardo Lemvo & Makina Loca, Tata Masamba (1996)
- Madilu, L'Eau (1998)
- Ricardo Lemvo & Makina Loca, Mambo Yo Yo (1998)
- Ricardo Lemvo, Sao Salvador (2000)
- Samba Mapangala & Orchestra Virunga, Ujumbe (2001)
- Déesse Mukangi, Lettre Anonyme (2002)
- Ricardo Lemvo, Ay Valeria! (2003)
- Mose Fan Fan, Bayekeleye (2004)
- Samba Mapangala & Orchestra Virunga, Song and Dance (2006)
- Columbiafrica, Voodoo Love Inna Champeta Land (2007)
- Zaïko Langa Langa, Rencontres (2007)
- Ricardo Lemvo, Isabela (2007)
- Ricardo Lemvo, Retrospectiva (2009)
- Syran Mbenza, Immortal Franco (2009)
