= Syran Mbenza =

Congolese-French guitarist

- Also known as: M’Benza
- Born: 31 May 1950 (age 76); Leopoldville, Belgian Congo (modern-day Democratic Republic of the Congo)
- Origin: Congolese
- Genres: Rumba; soukous
- Occupations: Guitarist; singer; composer; songwriter
- Instruments: Guitar vocals
- Years active: 1961—present

Syran Mbenza (or M’Benza; born May 31, 1950) is a guitarist, originally from the Democratic Republic of the Congo, who has lived in Paris since about 1981. He has recorded and performed prolifically over five decades, including as a solo artist; as one of the four members of the popular soukous "supergroup" Les Quatre Étoiles; as a founding member of the acoustic, Congolese rumba revival band Kékélé; in other bands; and in support of numerous artists. He has been described as one of the greatest guitar players of Africa.

== Career and history ==
=== Early years: Congo/Zaire (1950 to early 1970s) ===
Mingiedi "Syran" Mbenza was born on May 31, 1950, in a family of six, in Leopoldville (now Kinshasa), in what was then the Belgian Congo (and was later the Republic of the Congo, then Zaire, and is now the Democratic Republic of the Congo).

Mbenza began to play guitar at about age 11. He grew up hearing the music of Franco Luambo, and taught himself to play guitar in Franco's style. He played in a number of local bands, and learned from "Docteur Nico" (Nicolas Kasanda) of African Jazz. In 1968, while still in school, he joined a neighborhood group called La Banita and stayed until about 1970. This was followed by stints with Jamel Jazz, Dynamic Jazz, Ewawa de Malph, and Somo-Somo. (This list is included in several thumbnail biographies of Mbenza, though not confirmed by the few available sources on those bands, e.g. a list of renowned musicians with early experience in Jamel Jazz.)

He then joined the band Lovy du Zaire, formed in 1971 or 1972 by Victor "Vicky" Longomba, who was previously a co-founder of OK Jazz and afterward a member of African Jazz. Other later-famous musicians in Lovy du Zaire included Bumba Massa, Youlou Mabiala and Mose Se Sengo (Mose Fan Fan).

=== Beginning of musical career: Zaire and West Africa (1970s) ===
After leaving Lovy, Mbenza decided to become a professional musician, working with a group called Orchestre Kara (or Kara de Kinshasa) in a nightclub with the same name. Vicky Longomba had created that group in 1973 or 1974, as the successor band to Lovy.

In 1978 Mbenza moved to, in the words of Congolese-music historian Gary Stewart, "what looked — from downtrodden Kinshasa at least — like the more prosperous climate of West Africa," initially Lomé, Togo. There he joined the African All Stars of his cousin Sam Mangwana, with other Congolese musicians including guitarist Bopol Mansiamina, who would become a lifelong collaborator, and drummer Ringo Moya. The original version of that band only lasted about a year, though, then split in two, with one group (including Mangwana, Mbenza, and Bopol) moving to Abidjan, Cote d'Ivoire, and another group staying in Lomé.

After the split, Paris-based producer Eddy Gustave flew Mangwana, Mbenza, Bopol, and Pablo Lubadika to Paris for a September 1979 recording session, which resulted in two albums on his Eddy'son record label, including remakes of some African All-Stars hits. Confusingly, the covers of both albums are titled Eddy'Son Presente Sam Mangwana. For the next year, those four musicians "shuttled back and forth between Paris and the Abidjan-Lomé corridor," playing together as International Sam Mangwana.

The caption of a photo of the 1979 version of the African All Stars lists Mbenza's instrument as "mi-solo guitar." In Congolese music the mi-solo, or half-solo, guitar plays a part "between the solo guitars and the rhythm guitars." Mbenza's work with Mangwana made his name in Congolese music circles. In 1990, the New York Times noted his lead guitar work on Mangwana's 1979 "Maria Tebbo," which it described as "a pan-African hit."

While in West Africa, in 1980, he recorded his first solo album, Kouame.

=== With Les Quatre Étoiles: Paris (1980s and early 1990s) ===
In about 1981 Mbenza moved to Paris, where he has been based since, while frequently touring worldwide with other African musicians, including in Europe, North America, and East Africa. The years immediately following his move to Paris were his most prolific, to this date.

In Paris, Mbenza was in great demand as a session musician. As one of a number of Congolese "session men" in Paris — other such guitarists included Diblo Dibala, Rigo Star Bamundélé, and Dally Kimoko — he was often called on by producers to play guitar on others' records, for which he received a flat fee, in addition to leading on his own records, for which he earned royalties. He continued to work often with Bopol, who had moved from Lomé to Paris at about the same time, usually with Mbenza playing lead guitar and Bopol playing rhythm guitar. Producers who engaged Mbenza included Eddy Gustave and his Eddy'Son label, Moumouni Outtara and Afro-Rythme, Richard Dick and Africamania, and Ibrahim Sylla and Syllart, as well as the Salsa Musique, Melodie, and Buda Musique labels. Mbenza released several more solo albums: Ilanga on Eddy'Son, Elisa Dangwa on Africamania, Sisika on Syllart, and Symbiose.

In 1982, initially for Outtara's label, Mbenza and Bopol joined well-known Congolese singers Nyboma (Nyboma Mwan’dido) and Wuta Mayi to found the popular and influential soukous group Les Quatre Etoiles (the Four Stars), which released seven studio albums and three live albums (though two of those may be the same) through the mid-1990s, and played live shows as recently as 2010. Each of its four members was a star in his own right who recorded solo albums. Les Quatre Étoiles was a loose-knit arrangement rather than an exclusive one; Mbenza and its other three members released solo records, formed other bands, and played as sidemen in support of other musicians (notably including one another) throughout the time of their membership in Les Quatre Étoiles.

When Mbenza was touring the United States, Ibrahim Kanja Bah, who ran an African music radio show, record store, and record label in Washington, D.C., arranged recording sessions for him, resulting in his album Africa: The Golden Years, a medley of West African songs covered in Congolese style that was lamented by aficionados as starting a genre of "megamix" albums, and a similar approach to American soul classics released as Soul on Fire by "Maloko."

In 1988, Mbenza joined Congolese vocalists Passi Jo and Jean-Papy Ramazani to create a "side project" band called Kass Kass, which recorded several albums of high-energy, dance-floor soukous. Some of its music showed an influence of zouk, the French Caribbean dance music of that time, and in an interview Mbenza noted that he had worked in the studio with the zouk band Kassav'.

=== Recent years: Paris (late 1990s to present) ===
In addition to continuing to record and tour, Mbenza has engaged in two significant projects since Les Quatre Etoiles.

First, in 2000, with other veteran African musicians he formed Kékélé, a band that played slow-tempo Congolese rumba in a revival style harkening back to the 1950s, '60s, and '70s, using acoustic guitars. Its founders took this approach in reaction to the direction of Congolese music in the 1990s; as Mbenza explained, "There were no more songs, no more melodies. We thought about this and decided we had to get back to the rumba, what we played in the past. . . . Our music was becoming decadent. We had to wake it up again." He said that producer François Bréant "had the idea of asking me to form a band that would make records in the style [of vintage Congolese rumba] so that this great music should not die."

Kékélé was assembled under executive producer Ibrahima Sylla. The band's consistent core members were Mbenza on guitar and vocalists Nyboma, Wuta Mayi, Bumba Massa, and Loko ‘Djeskain’ Massengo. Other members of the band's cast at different times included guitarists Papa Noël Nedule, Yves Ndjock, and Rigo Star Bamundélé, saxophonist Manu Dibango, and singers Jean-Papy Ramazani, Mbilia Bel, and Madilu System. Kékélé released three studio albums and one live album between 2001 and 2006, and toured Europe, North America, the Caribbean, and Africa until 2010.

Second, in 2009, Mbenza recorded Immortal Franco: Africa's Unrivalled Guitar Legend, an album that paid tribute to the guitarist who had been his childhood inspiration, Franco. Its personnel included vocalists Wuta Mayi, Elba Kuluma, Ballou Canta, and Ketsia, guitarist Bopol, bassist Flavien Makabi, and saxophonist Jimmy Mvondo. It received positive notices from the Evening Standard (London) and Songlines magazine (UK), the Australian Broadcasting Company, RootsWorld (concluding, "Mbenza and his associates here salute the man in fabulous fashion"), and Concertzender radio (Netherlands). The Indie Acoustic Project named it as one of three finalists for Best CD of 2009 in the World Music: Africa category.

== Evaluations ==
Mbenza has been one of the best lead guitarists in a genre of music that is, as he explained to The New York Times, guitar-driven. He has played with nearly all of the top Congolese musicians of his time. His work is recognizable, with solos featuring fast runs of sparkling high notes that circle around a short theme, restating and amending it. The interplay of his guitar work with that of his frequent collaborator Bopol has been described as "legendary."

Several published assesments have characterized Mbenza's guiter playing favorably. He has been described as “an exceptionally gifted guitarist,” “extraordinary master guitarist,” “one of the best guitar virtuosos in Africa,” one of Africa's greatest guitarists, and “one of the world's finest guitarists.” One commentator described him as “the greatest living guitarist,” comparing him favorably with Carlos Santana and Ali Farka Toure. BBC broadcaster Andy Kershaw has also been quated as saying that Eric Clapton “isn't fit to tune Mbenza's guitar strings”.

== Discography ==
=== Solo albums ===
- Kouame (Syran M'Benza & L'African All Stars) (1980)
- Ilanga or Syran or Signé Eddy'Son (1983)
- Elisa Dangwa (1984)
- Sisika (1986)
- Bana or Mister (Super Hit Track Bana) (1987) [This is an alternative packaging of the album Kass Kass, by Kass Kass (listed below, under "As a Band Member").]
- Africa: The Golden Years (1989)
- Symbiose (Syran M'Benza with the Best of Paris) (1990 or 1991)
- Immortal Franco: Africa's Unrivaled Guitar Legend (Syran Mbenza & Ensemble Rumba Kongo) (2009)
- Rumba Africa (2026)

=== Featured With Other Artists ===
- Syran Mbenza & Bopol Masiamina [sic], The Best African Sound or Sambela (1987)

=== As a Band Member ===
- Vicky & Lovy du Zaire, (1971/1972/1973) (early 1970s singles, compilation released 1993)
- Orchestre Kara de Kinshasa, Orchestre Kara de Kinshasa (1979)
- Orchestre Kara de Kinshasa, Kiyika Masamba (Flamy) (1970s)
- Sam Mangwana & African All-Stars, vol. 1 (or Matinda) (1979)
- Les Quatre Étoiles, 4 Grandes Vedettes de la Musique Africaine (1983)
- Les Quatre Étoiles, 4 Stars (or Enfant Bamileke) (1984)
- Les Quatre Étoiles, Dance (1985)
- Kass Kass, Kass Kass (1987)
- Les Quatre Étoiles, 6 Hits / 6 Tubes (1987)
- Kass Kass, Kass Tout (1988)
- Les Quatre Étoiles, Zairian Stars Show in the US - Kilimanjaro Heritage Hall (1988, live)
- Maloko, Soul on Fire (1988)
- Les Quatre Étoiles, Four Stars (or Kouame) (1989, live) [may be same as Kilimanjaro live album]
- Les Quatre Étoiles, Les 4 Etoiles (or Souffrance) (1991)
- Les Quatre Étoiles, Sangonini (1993)
- Les Quatre Étoiles, Adama Coly (1995)
- Les Quatre Étoiles, Live in London (1996, live)
- Kékélé, Rumba Congo (2001)
- Kékélé, Congo Life (2003)
- Kékélé, Kinavana (2006)
- Kékélé, Live: Tournée Américaine & Canadienne (2006)

=== As a Supporting Artist ===
This is a partial list, a representative sample of the many albums on which Mbenza played guitar.

- Sam Mangwana, Maria Tebbo (1979)
- Sam Mangwana, Eddy'Son Presente Sam Mangwana or Georgette Eckin’s (1979)
- Sam Mangwana, Eddy'Son Presente Sam Mangwana or Matinda (1979)
- Asi Kapela, Jocker (1970s?)
- Bopol Mansiamina & Besisimou, Maillot Jaune (1982)
- Bumba Massa, L'Argent Et La Femme (1982)
- Pablo Lubadika, Idie (1982)
- Bopol Mansiamina, Manuela (1983)
- Nyboma Et Les Kamale Dynamiques Du Zaire, Aïcha Motema (1983)
- Wuta May [sic], Zalaka Mayele (1983)
- Wuta Mayi, Blaise Pasco Chante Saka Mache (1983)
- Bopol Mansiamina, Bopol (or Samedi Soir or Afric'Ambience) (1984)
- Bopol & Innovation Helena (12" single) (1984)
- Lea y Domingo, Jalousie (c. 1984)
- Pablo Lubadika, Concentration (1984)
- Wuta Mayi, Tout Mal Se Paie Ici Bas (1984)
- Lady Isa, Malembe (1986)
- Bopol Mansiamina, Belinda (1989)
- Fefe David Diambouana, Fefe David Diambouana or Mama Cathie (1980s?)
- Mayos, Muana Ngombo (1980s?)
- Passi-Jo & Kass Kass Connexion, Kayifi (1980s?)
- Wuta Mayi, Le Beach (1980s)
- Madilu System, Sans Commentaire (1993)
- Sam Mangwana, Rumba Music (1993)
- Pablo Lubadika, Okominiokolo (1994)
- Awilo Longomba, Moto Pamba (1995)
- Monique Seka, Okaman (1995)
- Mose Fan Fan & Somo Somo, Hello Hello (1995)
- Samba Mapangala and Virunga, Karibu Kenya (1995)
- Samba Mapangala and Orchestra Virunga, Vunja Mifupa (1997)
- Ricardo Lemvo & Makina Loca, Mambo Yo Yo (1998)
- Passy-Jo, Les Hommes Voltigeurs (1990s?)
- Sans Papiers, Sans Papiers (2000)
- Samba Mapangala & Orchestra Virunga, Song and Dance (2006)
- Madilu System, La Bonne Humeur (2007)
