= Uta Bella =

- Born: June 23, 1947
- Died: February 21, 2021 (aged 73)
- Genres: Afrobeat, disco
- Years active: 1970-2021

Uta Bella (June 23, 1947 - February 21, 2021) was a Cameroonian singer and composer.

== Biography ==
In the late 1960s and early 1970s, Uta Bella released a series of 45-rpm recordings. Nassa Nassa's album was released, and she performed at the 20th anniversary of President Ahmadou Ahidjo's rise to power. She was a composer.

Her genre was Afrobeat, and she was a pioneer of this style. Her cover of the song "Amio," incorporated these sounds.

She was diagnosed with COVID-19 and died from complications from it on February 21, 2021.

== Discography ==
Albums

- Kekeh meyilamba (1969)
- Alu (1973)
- Nassa nassa (1978)

=== Singles ===
- “Metek” (1978)
- “Pour Etre Heureux” (1981)
- “Monboulae” (1969)
