= Empire Bakuba =

Congolese soukous band

- Origin: Kinshasa, Democratic Republic of Congo
- Genres: Congolese rumba; soukous
- Years active: 1972–2001
- Past members: Pépé Kallé; Papy Tex; Dilu Dilumona; Bileku Mpasi Djouna Mumbafu; "Boeing 737" Kinanga Nanzao; "Doris" Ebuya Lange; Dokolos; Jolie Bebe; "Emoro" Tumba Ayila

Empire Bakuba was a soukous band formed in Zaire (now Democratic Republic of the Congo) in 1972. The name of the band refers to the Bakuba Kingdom; it is sometimes reported as Empire Bakuba du Grand Kalle, in honor of Grand Kalle, the "father of Congolese music", who was also bandleader Pepe Kalle's mentor. The band has never formally disbanded, although its activity has been scarce since Pepe Kalle's death (in 1998).

Core members of the group include singers Pepe Kalle, "Papy Tex" Matolu Dode, Dilu Dilumona, and lead singer, dancer, songwriter, choreographer and animateur Bileku Mpasi Djouna Mumbafu (Bigone). Djouna played a major role to popularize Empire Bakuba since 1980 at the age of 15 years when he was discovered by Pepe Kalle and brought into the Empire Bakuba Band, through November 1998, when Pepe Kalle died. Djouna Mumbafu continues to be active both with the current scarce Empire Bakuba band activity, and as a solo artist with his Orchestre Big One. Other members of Empire Bakuba include guitarists "Boeing 737" Kinanga Nanzao and "Doris" Ebuya Lange, Dokolos, Jolie Bebe and the dancer "Emoro" Tumba Ayila.

== History ==
Empire Bakuba was founded in 1972 by Pepe Kalle, Papy Tex and Dilu Dilumona, who were all at the time members of Lipua Lipua, and had previously been part of neighbourhood band African Choc. They quickly established themselves as one of the leading youth bands of Kinshasa, becoming a constant presence in the Congolese charts and a major part of the soukous scene in the 1970s and 1980s.

Compared to that of other popular soukous bands of the time, such as Zaiko Langa Langa, Empire Bakuba's sound was characterized by the strong influence of Congolese traditional and tribal music. This also reflects in the kwassa kwassa, a dance style that was popularized by Empire Bakuba and later adopted by several other Congolese acts, most notably Kanda Bongo Man and Koffi Olomide. Empire Bakuba's live performances were highly scenographic, with frontman Pepe Kalle, who was six feet tall and weighing 300 pounds, accompanied by dwarf dancer Emoro.

In 1992, the band had to face Emoro's sudden death. By this time, the apex of Empire Bakuba's success had passed, yet the group remained quite popular. Emoro was replaced by three Pygmy dancers and Empire's live performances became even more similar to circus shows. When Pepe Kalle died in 1998, and his death was followed by a serious car accident involving Papy Tex. For a while, Empire Bakuba was considered by the media to have ceased to exist. By 1999, nevertheless, Papy Tex had recovered and become the new leader of the band, which released a few more albums. Papy Tex is still with Empire Bakuba, although the band has not been very active in recent years.

== Partial discography ==
Sources:

- Nazingi Maboto
- Chérie Ondi (Editions Veve 198?)
- Zabolo (Rythmes et Musique 1982)
- Amour propre (Editions Veve 1984)
- Tête africaine (DK 1985)
- Bombe atomique (Mélodie 1985)
- Muana Bangui (Rythmes et Musique 1985)
- Trop c'est trop (Rythmes et Musique 1985)
- La Belle Etoile (Rythmes et Musique 1984)
- Bonana 85 (PF 1985)
- Kabambare (1985)
- Livre d'or (DV 1986)
- Dans Masassi calculé à Abidjan (ACMP 1986)
- Adieu Dr. Nico (Sonodisc 1986)
- Obosini Kisomele (Syllart 1986)
- Allah (Rythmes et Musique, 1986)
- Bakuba Show (Syllart 1987)
- Sombokila (Syllart 1987)
- Blanche neige (Rythmes et Musique 1987, with Grand Zaiko Wa Wa)
- Nzoto ya chance / 8000 km, also known as Kwassa Kwassa (Leader Records Repro 1987)
- Joe Dikando (LS 1987)
- Pon Moun Paka Bougé (Afrorythmes 1988)
- Moyibi (Syllart 1988)
- Ya Moseka de l'Empire Bakuba (SIC 1988)
- Show times (1989)
- Cé Chalé Carnaval (Afrorythmes 1989)
- Pepe Kalle chante le poète Simaro (JM Production 1989)
- Atinze Mwana Popi (BB 1989, reissued by Sonodisc in 1993)
- Gigantafrique (Globestyle 1990)
- L'argent ne fait pas le bonheur (Gefraco/Kaluila 1990)
- Mavuela Somo & Pepe Kalle (MDL 1990, with Mavuela Somo)
- Stop feu rouge – voisin (Bleu Caraibes 1990)
- Le tube de vos vacances: Liya Liya Faina (SIMS/Sonodisc 1991)
- Feux d'artifice (Sonodisc 1992)
- Hommage à Emoro (Syllart 1992)
- Larger than Life (Stern's STCD 1992)
- Divisé par deux (Sonodisc 1993)
- Poto Malili: Kinshasa Moto! Moto! (Musicanova 1993)
- Mamie (Gefraco/Kaluila 1993)
- Savoir vivre (B-Mass BMP 1995)
- Gardez votre souffle (SUN 1995)
- Kamola Basse (1995)
- Wasiwa (Sonodisc 1996)
- Welcome in Africa (Babi/Jimmy's 1996)
- Full Option (Babi Production 1997)
- Souci ya Likinga (Flash FDB 1997)
- Merci Maman (B-Mass BMP 1997)
- Loin des yeux, Dieu seul sait (Flash FDB 1997)
- Les plus grands succès (Ngoyarto 1998)
- Cocktail (Ndiaye/Mélodies Tempo 1998)
- Best of... (Syllart 1998)
- Young Africa (EXW 1999)
- Souvenirs (Syllart 1999)
- The Best of Pepe Kalle (BMG-Milan 1999)
- Sauvetage (J.P.S. 2001)
- Sango Ya Mawa (Ngoyarto 2003)
- La naissance de l'Orchestre: Nazoki (Ngoyarto 2003)
- Johnny Bitoto (Ngoyarto 2004)
