= Rigo Star =

Congolese musician (1955–2023)

Rigobert Bamundele (28 August 1955 – 26 October 2023), best known as Rigo Star, was a Congolese soukous guitarist and composer. He played with several major soukous and world music acts, including Papa Wemba's Viva La Musica, Bozi Boziana's Anti-Choc, Kanda Bongo Man, Koffi Olomide, Kékélé, Paul Simon, and Fally Ipupa. His name is mostly associated with Congolese female singer Mbilia Bel, with whom he collaborated almost exclusively throughout the 1990s. He also released a few solo works, including the 1998 album Attention! with Sam Mangwana on vocals. Star died on 26 October 2023, in Reims, France, at the age of 68.

== Partial discography ==
=== Solo ===
- Got the Feeling (1997)
- Attention! (1998)
- Ne refuse pas (1985)

=== With Mbilia Bel ===
- Phénomène (1988)
- Ironie (1993)

=== With Mbilia Bel and Vivick Matou ===
- Yalowa (1996)

=== With Koffi Olomide ===
- Aï aï aï la bombe eclate (1987)

=== With Bozi Boziana's Anti-Choc ===
- Coupe Monte
- Pere Noel Confiance

=== With Paul Simon ===
- The Rhythm of the Saints (1990)
