= Matt Sharp (television producer) =

American television producer

Matt Sharp (born April 13, 1972, in Syracuse, New York) is an American television producer.

Sharp is the founder and CEO of Sharp Entertainment, a major producer of unscripted television founded in 2003 and now part of Sony Pictures Television Nonfiction.

== Early life and education ==
Sharp's parents were history professor James Roger Sharp and the late journalist and professor Nancy Sharp, both of whom taught at Syracuse University. He attended Fayetteville-Manlius High School and the University of Vermont, and was a teenage entrepreneur. Early in his career he worked at Viacom and CBS News in production and development.

== Sharp Entertainment ==
Sharp's first production credit with Sharp Entertainment was VH1's The Fabulous Life in 2003. His other production credits include 90 Day Fiancé and its many spinoffs, Love After Lockup, Marrying Millions, American Tarzan, Man v. Food, Love Off the Grid, Doomsday Preppers, Food Wars, Extreme Couponing, Bert the Conqueror, and most recently the Western docuseries The Wranglers.

His shows have appeared on The Discovery Channel, TLC, VH1, National Geographic, Bravo, Travel Channel, A&E, The Food Network, and others.

Sharp is best known for 90 Day Fiancé. He got the idea for the show in 2011, but the networks he initially shopped it to didn't think its seemingly unlikely premise would be a success. It finally launched in 2014 and has been in production ever since, spawning many spinoffs.

Sharp executive-produced numerous TV movies, including Halloween's Most Extreme, Lost Magic Decoded, and The iPod Revolution. In 2012 he produced the Syracuse basketball documentary Orange Glory.

== Awards and honors ==
In 2021 Sharp Entertainment won a Critics Choice Real TV Award for Outstanding Achievement in Nonfiction Production. In 2023 he received the RealScreen Award for "Outstanding Achievement: Reality Docusoap" for 90 Day Fiancé. In 2023 The Hollywood Reporter named Sharp a "Reality Heatmaker."

B+C Multichannel News named Sharp Producer of the Year for 2024.
