= Awilo Longomba =

Congolese musician (born 1962)

- Born: Louis Albert William Longomba; 5 May 1962 (age 64); Kinshasa, Democratic Republic of the Congo
- Genres: Techno-soukous; rumba; ndombolo
- Occupations: Singer; dancer; composer; songwriter; record producer; drummer; media personality
- Years active: 1980s—present
- Labels: Jip Productions; Mélodie Distribution; Section Zouk Records; AJIP
- Formerly of: Viva La Musica; Orchestre Stukas; Loketo; Nouvelle Génération
- Website: awilomusic.com

Louis Albert William Longomba (born 5 May 1962), known professionally as Awilo Longomba, is a Congolese soukous singer, drummer, songwriter, dancer, and producer. William is known for pioneering the techno-soukous genre, a variant of soukous that blends techno music with ndombolo, often incorporating elements of electronic dance music and zouk.

Between 1980 and 1995, William made his music debut as a drummer for Viva La Musica, Stukas, Loketo, Nouvelle Génération. He rose to fame across Africa and among the continent's diaspora in Europe after releasing his debut solo album Moto Pamba, which won him two consecutive Best Artist of Central Africa at the 1996 and 1997 Kora Awards. In 1998, William released his second studio album, Coupé Bibamba. The album's eponymous single (featuring Jocelyne Béroard on vocals), became a chart-topper in Africa and gained a considerable following among the African diaspora residing in Europe and America. It is often regarded as one of Africa's most acclaimed Lingala songs. The song was later featured in the World Tribute to the Funk compilation album by Sony Music, featuring a new funk remix titled "Comment Tu T'Appelles" with James D-Train Williams.

His third studio album Kafou Kafou, debuted in July 2000, later won him the Judges' Special Awards at the 2001 Kora Awards for his contribution to African music. In September 2003, he issued his fourth studio album, Mondongo. In August 2008, he published his fifth studio album, Superman. In 2009, William clinched the accolade of Best Soukous Entertainer at the IRAWMA Awards.

== Early life and career ==
=== 1962–1994: Childhood, education and music debut ===
Awilo Longomba was born Louis Albert William Longomba on 5 May 1962, in Kinshasa (formerly Léopoldville) to a Mongo father and a Ngombe mother from Équateur Province. Longomba hailed from a well-known musical family: his father, Vicky Longomba, was the lead vocalist and founding member of Tout Puissant OK Jazz. He was born to a family of six sisters and three brothers. He is the uncle of the Kenyan-based music duo Lovy Longomba and the late Christian Longomba. His older sister, Malou Longomba, is the mother of French professional soccer player Claude Makélélé.

As a child, Longomba spent every moment around music, frequently attending his father's rehearsals. His father, influenced by his views on contemporary musicians as dissolute figures, often clothed himself in sartorial splendor and ardently discouraged his son from pursuing a music career. In an interview with Daily Nation, Longomba mentioned, "My father inspired me but he never wanted me to get into music. Despite that, he was a loving father who ensured that all his children got a good education". Logomba's passion for music burgeoned exponentially, leading him to abandon school and become a drummer for Papa Wemba's band Viva La Musica in 1985.

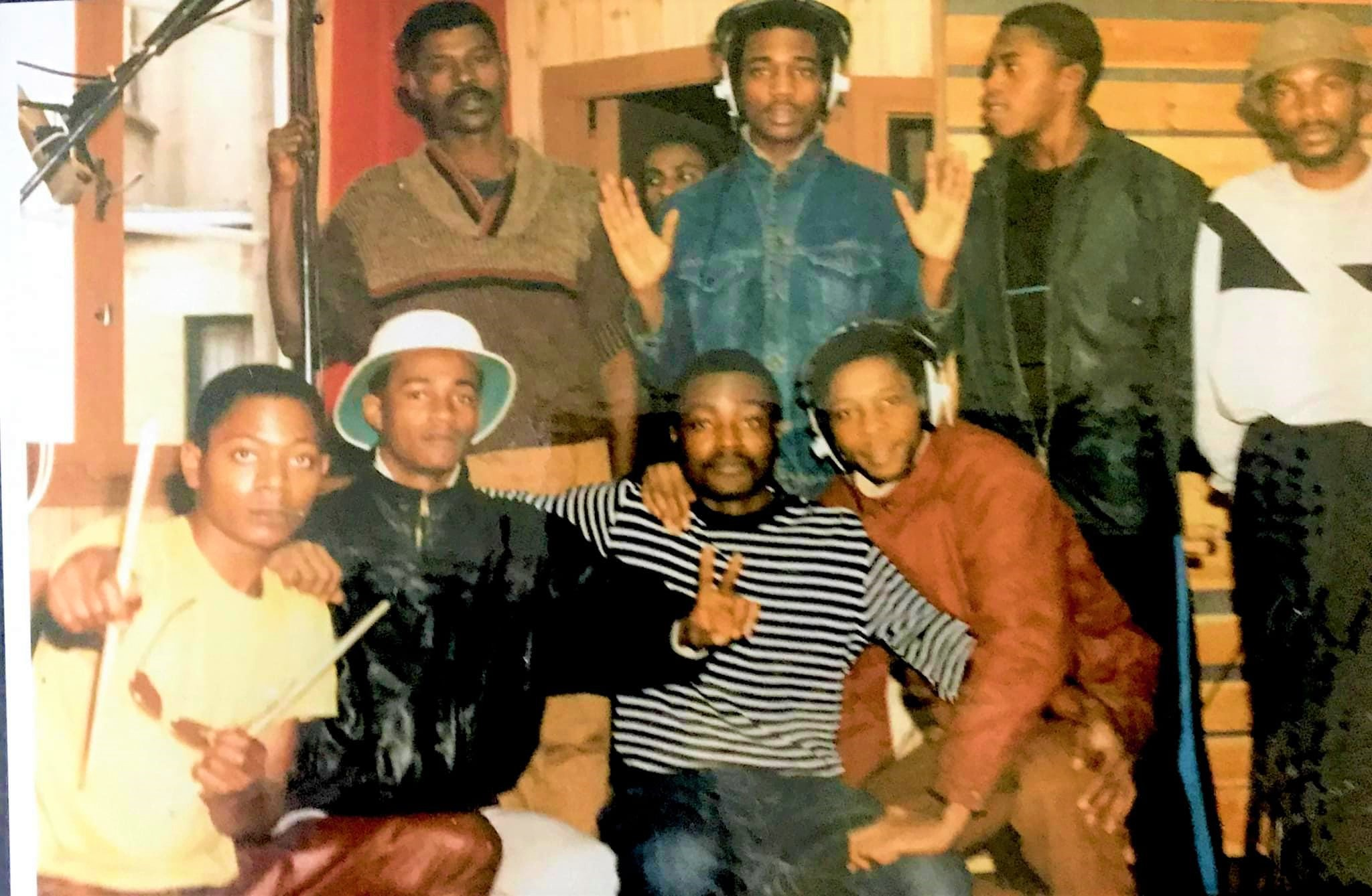
Longomba (far left) photographed in 1985 during a studio session with Viva La Musica.

In 1986, as part of their Euro–Asia tours, Longomba and Viva La Musica toured Matonge in Brussels to record their project "Destin ya Moto" at Gina Efonge's bar. There, his stature as an exceptional drummer within the group gained momentum. In 1989, he permanently relocated to Paris and applied for his Carte de Séjour. During his residency in Paris, Longomba encountered prejudiced attitudes towards Afro-French and became increasingly resentful of the emergence of Jean-Marie Le Pen's movement, which accentuated the pervasiveness of racism in France, particularly within political factions like the National Front. In a 1996 interview with historian James A. Winders of Appalachian State University, Longomba noted "....I saw that there was discrimination coming from the prefecture-how they spoke to people, to Africans, to others who did not understand French well. It was there that I saw that there is a very dangerous discrimination". Though not as high-profile as Ray Lema, he had assimilated into Parisian life and had formed a personal attachment to the city.

In the early 1990s, while with Viva La Musica, Longomba began drumming for various Congolese bands, including Orchestre Stukas and Loketo. In 1991, he toured Kenya for the first time, accompanying Aurlus Mabélé and the Loketo band as a drummer. A year later, he parted ways with Viva La Musica and founded his band, La Nouvelle Génération, of which he became the bandleader, accompanied by members Luciana de Mingongo, Lidjo Kwempa, Fataki Ndoko José, Maray Maray, Maestro Fanfan, and Fafa de Molokaï. The newly established group swiftly garnered acclaim in Africa and produced several albums. He collaborated on numerous records in France and toured globally with prominent African artists. He became a French citizen in 1994, having married a French woman.

== Solo career ==
=== 1995–1998: Moto Pamba and performances ===
In 1995, Longomba left La Nouvelle Génération to start his solo career. In an interview with the Congolese French-language newspaper La Prospérité, he said he decided to leave because he was disappointed with the way singers treated instrumentalists. That frustration later inspired his first studio album, Moto Pamba. His initial plan was to record a guide vocal and then bring other singers to Paris to finalize the project. However, none of the invited vocalists showed up for the session, even though the studio had already been booked and paid for, and since reimbursement was not possible, the sound engineer encouraged Longomba to record the vocals himself by following the guide track with some coaching.

Released that year by Paris-based Jip Productions and distributed by Mélodie Distribution, Moto Pamba contained eight tracks and blended Congolese rumba with techno-soukous. Longomba wrote the songs, played drums, and became the lead singer, but, "lacking confidence in his own voice", he invited several musicians to join the project, with backing vocals by Ballou Canta and Shimita, additional vocals from Abby Surya, Dindo Yogo, Kuleta Pompon, Luciana Demingongo, and Sam Mangwana, bass by Miguel Yamba, Ngouma Lokito, and Pablo Lubadika Porthos, guitars by Lokassa Ya M'Bongo, Emmanuel Samba, Rigo Star, Dally Kimoko, and Syran Mbenza, mixing by Thierry Doumergue, and percussion by 3615 Niaou and Mavungu Malanda. Longomba recalled that audiences were surprised when they discovered that he was the singer on Moto Pamba, since they knew him mainly as a drummer. This became especially clear during the filming of the title track's music video. Although he had arranged a group of male and female dancers and intended to stay behind the drums, the director insisted that he appear on screen as the lead singer instead. The videos for "Moto Pamba" and "Moyen Te" achieved widespread popularity across Africa and led to a live performance production contract. When submitting his touring lineup, he listed himself as drummer, a choice that drew objections from the promoter, who felt he should be recognized as the group's frontman.

Longomba also accompanied Gabonese singer Olivier N'Goma on several concert appearances as a session drummer, during which his own popularity began to emerge. During a concert at Kampala Serena Hotel, he was told to disguise himself under a balaclava and glasses and go by the pseudonym "Willy" to avoid upstaging N'Goma, though N'Goma eventually introduced him by his real name. Joking afterward, N'Goma told him, "You stole my thunder, I won't invite you again". Shortly afterward, he performed in Zambia under his own name, where strong demand expanded his schedule from two concerts to nine. His growing popularity soon extended across East, South, and Central Africa, reaching audiences in Kenya, Tanzania, Uganda, and Malawi. In 1996, Longomba further promoted Moto Pamba through a live performance at Parc de la Villette in Paris and subsequently won the Best Artist of Central Africa at the first edition of the Kora Awards. He received the same accolade on 1 October 1997.

=== 1998–2000: Continent-wide success with Coupé Bibamba ===
On 27 October 1998, Longomba debuted his second studio album, Coupé Bibamba. The ten-song record was produced by Jip Productions and arranged by Lazare Gamand and Ntoumba Minka, and includes backing and leading vocals from Longomba, Jocelyne Béroard, Guy-Guy Fall, Tutu Callugi, Abby Surya, Awa Maïga, Lidjo Kwempa, Marilyn Komba, Patricia Aubou, and Alain Mpéla Yoka. Longomba played the drums, supported by Dally Kimoko, Caien Madoka, and Japonais Maladi on lead guitars, Faustino Ngoita and Ntoumba Minka on bass guitars, Mavungu Malanda and Zé Luis Nascimento on percussion, and Briscard Kouadio and Japonais Maladi on rhythm guitars. The album was supported by hit singles "Coupé Bibamba", "Gâté Le Coin", "Manon", and "Porokondo".

The eponymous techno-soukous-infused-single, which featured Jocelyne Béroard on vocals, became a smash hit in Africa and Europe, as well as among diaspora communities worldwide, and remains a timeless classic in African music. The song addresses the issue of poverty in Africa. In an interview with the Daily Nation, Longomba expressed that "Coupé Bibamba" urges young people to pursue education, attend church, and have faith in themselves to combat poverty in Africa. The incorporation of mabanga, a practice where musicians mention an individual's name during a song for a fee, was notable, with the mention directed at Robert Ogwal, also known as Rasta Rob, a prominent radio presenter in the African Great Lakes Region at the time. "Coupé Bibamba" success enabled Longomba to embark on an East African tour in early 1999, with sold-out performances in Tanzania, including shows in Dar es Salaam, Moshi, Arusha, and Mwanza. Due to overwhelming public demand, he extended his stay, and numerous fans were unable to gain entry to his debut show at the Diamond Jubilee Upanga in Dar es Salaam. He then performed in Kenya at the Carnivore in Nairobi before proceeding to Mamba Village in Mombasa and the Kimwa Grand Hotel in Kisumu.

"Coupé Bibamba" also augmented Longomba's visibility in West Africa, where it led to interpretations in various native languages, including Yoruba, Igbo and Nigerian Pidgin. As reported by This Day, his music gained substantial recognition in southern Nigeria and swiftly proliferated to the north, where "every verse of the Koran, Hausa children know two lines of Comment tu t'appelle". In 2000, Longomba achieved the unprecedented feat of selling out three consecutive concerts at Lagos National Stadium. He also filled the 22,000-seat Nnamdi Azikiwe Stadium in Enugu and later the 30,000-seat Jolly Nyame Stadium in Jalingo in 2003, becoming the first Congolese artist to dominate Nigerian airwaves, having earlier, in 2001, become the first Congolese artist to perform in São Tomé and Príncipe and, alongside Miriam Makeba, the only Sub-Saharan African artist to perform in Libya during the creation of the African Union. His collaboration with Sony Music for the World Tribute to the Funk compilation album for the song's new funk remix titled "Comment Tu T'Appelles", featuring James D-Train Williams, gained popularity among the continent's diaspora in France and the US and was also included in Edenways Records' African Dance Floor compilation album. This led to Longomba's performance at Zénith de Paris alongside Jocelyn Lorette Brown, Oliver Cheatham, Jerome Prister, Imagination and Anita Ward, all of whom were part of World Tribute to the Funk.

=== 2000–2008: Kafou Kafou, Mondongo and performances ===
In July 2000, Longomba released his third studio album, Kafou Kafou. Consisting of 10 tracks, Kafou Kafou was produced by Jimmy Houetinou through Jip Productions and jointly distributed by Mélodie Distribution and Section Zouk Records. It later earned him the Jury Special Award at the 2001 Kora Awards, which he offered to Nelson Mandela at Sun City. In an interview with Foster Romanus of the Late Nite Celebrity Show, he expressed that having Mandela in attendance was a significant honor, given his profound respect for Mandela's influential contributions to Africa, and on 10 January 2003, he met privately with President Mandela in South Africa. Prior to that, in late 2002, he toured various African countries, including shows in Ouagadougou and in Equatorial Guinea, and also performed in Europe, with a concert in Munich on 28 December.

Longomba introduced his fourth studio album, Mondongo, in September 2003 through AJIP, with distribution by Mélodie Distribution. The album was supported by hit singles "Karolina", "Zumbeya", "Mupenzi", "Pinzoli", "Gladys", "Kayembe", "Mondongo", "Champion", "Mia Muliere", and "Dance Floor". Mondongo was a blend of Congolese rumba, techno-soukous, R&B, and Kompa. It achieved widespread acclaim in Africa and sold over 30,000 copies in France. The album's lead single, "Karolina", became a staple at hall parties and is often cited as the most-played song at African events. In the song, Longomba expresses his admiration for his muse, Karolina, extolling her physical appeal comprehensively – from head to toe, front, and back. Longomba promoted the album with sold-out shows in Harare, Bulawayo, and Chitungwiza towards the year's end, alongside Zimbabwean singer Alick Macheso. To further support Mondongo, Longomba went on a tour in Cameroon in 2004, with performances at Cinéma Le Wouri, Stade Mbappé Léppé, Cinéma Abbia, and Ahmadou Ahidjo Stadium. In November that year, Longomba received a nomination for "Karolina" at the 2004 Kora Awards.

In March 2005, Longomba took the stage at the Africa Live 2005 concert, a malaria-fighting event hosted at the Iba-Mar-Diop Stadium, where he performed in front of 40,000 people with other co-performers including Youssou N'Dour, Orchestra Baobab, Tinariwen, Didier Awadi, Corneille, Salif Keita, Rokia Traoré, Manu Dibango, and Seun Kuti. The event was organised by Youssou N'Dour as part of the Roll Back Malaria Partnership (RBM), an initiative launched in 1998 by the World Health Organization, United Nations Development Programme, UNICEF, and the World Bank. The following month, he launched a US tour with his backing band, including guitarist Caien Madoka, vocalist Omba Petit Bokul, and drummer Simolo Katondi, with stops in New York City, Washington D.C., Boston, Dallas, and Houston. Among their prominent performances was a notable appearance at New York's Satalla World Music venue, delivering two sets to a full house on 1 April. The performance featured several of his popular tracks, including "Karolina", and included a special appearance by bassist Ngouma Lokito, co-founder of Soukous Stars, who joined the band to play "Coupé Bibamba". On 16 April, he performed at the French venue, C'est La Vie club in Atlanta.

In September 2005, Longomba held three concerts in Windhoek, Swakopmund, and Oshakati. In July next year, Longomba performed in Libreville as part of the Amissa Bongo Foundation and Iriscom International's second edition of the Nuit de la Musique. He also played at the Sumbe International Music Festival, colloquially called "FestiSumbe", in Sumbe in September 2006. In 2007, Longomba held two consecutive sold-out concerts at the Hotel Ivoire in Cocody and the Yopougon Sports Complex in Yopougon. He followed this up with a Labor Day concert in Antananarivo in 2008, where he was joined by about twenty other artists.

=== 2008–present: Superman, performances and collaborations ===
In August 2008, Longomba published his fifth studio album Superman, which contained standout tracks like "Super Man", "Torticolis", "Les Jaloux", "Malala", "Maze", "Meu Amor", "Banana", "La Go Là", "Baby", "J'Ai Envie de Toi", "BK", and "Banana Remix". Barbara Kanam also made a guest appearance on Superman. He subsequently took the stage at Zénith de Paris on 27 December 2009, to promote Superman. He later appeared in Antananarivo to commemorate the 50th anniversary of Malagasy Independence on 26 June 2010.

On 5 May 2014, in celebration of his birthday, Longomba debuted an audio preview of his new single, "Bundele", which was co-produced by London-based BA Nuisance and Nigerian producer TeeBeeO. Prior to the premiere of the "Bundele" music video on 29 July 2014, Longomba collaborated with the Nigerian duo P-Square on the track "Enemy Solo". He later performed on 4 April 2015 at the Gidi Culture Festival in Lagos's Eko Atlantic and appeared on Nathalie Makoma's "Eyi Mabe", released on 30 December 2016. On 23 January 2017, he premiered the single "Rihanna", featuring Yemi Alade, followed by the Afrobeat-infused single "Esopi Yo", which included a guest appearance by Tiwa Savage. Longomba performed at the Born In Africa Festival (BAFEST) at Eko Atlantic on 16 December 2018, an event organized by Live Spot in collaboration with Access Bank and other prominent organizations to honor loyal fans and celebrate African talent. On 25 December, he appeared on BM's remix of "Rosalina", which sparked a global dance trend on social media platforms like Instagram, TikTok, and Facebook, with professional and amateur dancers showcasing their best moves. He later held two consecutive concerts in Uganda: one at the Kampala Serena Hotel on 5 April 2019, and another at Greenlight Stadium in Arua on 7 April, where he brought Robinio Mundibu on stage, providing Robinio a platform to promote his Extended play (EP) Chiffre 9. He then unveiled the Moe Musa–directed music video for "Canon", a Congolese rumba and Afrobeats fusion, on 15 April. On 23 April 2021, Longomba was featured on Harmonize's single "Attitude", which rapidly amassed three million YouTube views in 24 hours. He then appeared on Angel Mary Kato's single "Tanzania", a fusion of Bongo Flava and soukous.

On 29 October 2022, Longomba performed at the Fally Ipupa concert at the Stade des Martyrs de la Pentecôte. In November 2022, Longomba collaborated with Werrason, Reddy Amisi, Rebo Tchulo, Jeannot Bombenga, Héritier Watanabe, M'bilia Bel, Sista Becky, Poison Mobutu, Mianda Kabamba and Samarino on "Allons Tous Nous Faire Enrôler", a song composed for CENI's campaign to raise awareness among the population about the identification and enrolment operation for the 2023 Democratic Republic of the Congo general election. On 31 December 2022, Longomba guest-performed on Inoss'B's Afrocongo-style single "Maboko Milayi", which garnered two million views on YouTube within 13 days. In March 2023, Longomba was appointed as a coach for the first season of the Voice Africa, a version of the global franchise tailored for the Anglophone African audience, offering a contrast to the Voice Afrique Francophone. On 5 August, he shared the stage with Afrigo Band during the Legends of Sound concert held at the Sheraton Gardens of the Sheraton Kampala Hotel. He later joined Innoss'B on stage during the "Umoja" humanitarian concert at the La Madeleine concert hall in Brussels in December of that year, performing alongside Yemi Alade and Rebo Tchulo. On 6 July 2024, Longomba headlined a concert at Woodbine Park in Toronto as part of the city's three-day annual AfroFest. However, as the festival neared its ending during Longomba's set, an incident involving teenage boys discharging pellet guns incited pandemonium among the crowd, which abruptly terminated the event. On 10 August, he appeared at the Antilliaanse Feesten Festival in Hoogstraten, during the festival's three-day night performance series. He went on to perform alongside Ugandan rapper Keko at Afro Explosion Uganda on 30 August at Eripak Beach in Arua. On 15 November, Longomba released the single "Mbongo Na Ngai Moko", a fusion of ndombolo and soukous, which featured Innoss'B.

== Artistry and legacy ==
=== Influences and musical style ===
Longomba has cited that his inspiration comes from earlier generations of Congolese music. He has often cited his father, Vicky Longomba, as well as Franco Luambo, Le Grand Kallé, Tabu Ley Rochereau, and Nico Kasanda. He has also spoken of learning extensively from Papa Wemba, whom he credits with mentoring younger artists.

He is particularly noted for developing his own genre, techno-soukous. Speaking to Sud Quotidien, Longomba described techno-soukous as a technologically modernized form of soukous that is characterized by the integration of diverse African musical elements, especially in percussion and guitar arrangements. He has emphasized his strong attachment to traditional music, which he incorporates into several of his compositions. In an interview with La Prospérité, he explained that his desire to stand out artistically led him to create a style uniquely his own. The genre also encompasses elements he refers to as "techno-ndombolo", alongside influences from electronic dance music and Afro-zouk. Lyrically, his songs address themes such as joy, celebration, hope, youth motivation, personal responsibility, empowerment, and guidance for young women.

=== Legacy ===
Longomba is regarded as one of Africa's most influential musicians. According to Sud Quotidien, he succeeded in propelling "his Congolese surname to the top of the continental charts, swearing only by the new technology of soukous". Writing for Legit.ng, Olumide Alake noted that despite not performing in English, Nigeria's official language, Longomba nonetheless "won the hearts of millions of music lovers in the country and across the world".

Jide Taiwo, writing for Nigerian Entertainment Today, opined that he "inspired a new crop of Nigerian entertainers who made several spoofs of his songs and thus began their own careers", and further noted that his dominance of Nigerian airwaves was unrivaled, and while later Congolese artists such as Koffi Olomide and Fally Ipupa gained prominence, they did not replicate the same level of public frenzy. Longomba's musical style has notably influenced several Nigerian musicians, including Funmi Adams, known for her song "Yaro" performed in Hausa, and Julius Agwu, whose tracks such as "Okombo", "Chop Bisikit", "Bendown Sellect", and "I Buy Kwilikwili" all draw from Longomba's style. Nigerian singer-songwriter Burna Boy credited him as a significant source of inspiration during his formative years in a guest appearance on Clique TV.

In February 2023, Nigerian singer Ayra Starr released "Sability", a techno-soukous-inspired single that sampled "Coupé Bibamba". This release garnered praise from Tanzanian singer Harmonize, who commended the song's homage to Longomba and expressed admiration for his musical impact and stating, "I want to be like Awilo Longomba".

== Personal life ==
Historian James A. Winders of Appalachian State University noted in his book Paris Africain: Rhythms of the African Diaspora that Longomba permanently relocated to Paris in 1989, settling in a building near Rue du Temple, and later acquired French citizenship in 1994 following his marriage to a French woman. In a 2016 interview with La Prospérité, Longomba disclosed that he is the father of six children and resides in London, where he relocated with his family. Additional reports have identified his wife as Paradis Kacharelle.

During the mid-2000s, specifically between 2004 and 2005, Longomba was the subject of media speculation linking him romantically to fellow Congolese singer Barbara Kanam, though he clarified to La Prospérité that although they shared a cordial relationship, he was married and chose to keep his personal life private. He also stated that he was the one who decided to bring the "relationship" to an end, noting that his reasons were personal and not something he wished to discuss publicly.

== Discography ==
=== Albums ===
- Moto Pamba (1995)
- Coupe Bibamba (1999)
- Kafou Kafou (2001)
- Mondongo (2003)
- Super-Man (2008)

== Awards and nominations ==
Year	Event	Prize	Recipient	Result	Ref.
1996	Kora Awards	Best Central African Male	Himself	Won	
1997	Kora Awards	Best Central African Male	Himself	Won	
2001	Kora Awards	Jury Special Award	Himself	Won	
2004	Kora Awards	Best Central African Male	Himself	Nominated	
2009	IRAWMA Awards	Best Soukous Entertainer	Himself	Won	
2011	Nigeria Entertainment Awards	Pan-African Artist	Himself	Nominated	
2019	AFRIMA	Legend of the Year	Himself	Won	
2021	AFRIMMA	Legendary Award	Himself	Won	
2022	Zikomo Africa Awards	Best Achievement in Music	Himself	Won	
2026	Kundé	Kundé d'Honneur	Himself	Won	
