= BM (singer) =

Congolese-born British musician (born 1992)

- Also known as: BM The Artist, BM Congolais, BM Artist
- Born: Bolia Matundu; 12 July 1992 (age 34); Kinshasa, Zaire
- Genre: Ndombolo
- Occupations: Singer; dancer; songwriter; record producer; composer; media personality
- Instruments: Vocals, guitars, percussion
- Years active: 2010–present
- Formerly of: DRT
- Spouse: Arlette Amuli (m. 2021)

Bolia Matundu (born 12 July 1992), also known by the initialism BM, is a Congolese-born, British singer-songwriter, dancer, director and record producer. Born in Kinshasa and raised in London, Matundu is considered one of the influential figures in 21st-century ndombolo music.

Matundu rose to prominence with his 2015 hit single "Ebebi" from his eponymous debut studio album, which gained international acclaim and amassed significant viewership on YouTube. His subsequent hit single "Rosalina" (2018), along with its remix featuring Awilo Longomba released that same year, enjoyed continent-wide success, giving rise to the viral "Rosalina dance challenge" trend that rapidly proliferated across social media platforms and was embraced by various celebrities.

== Early life, education and career ==
Bolia Matundu was born on 12 July 1992 in Kinshasa, in what was then Zaire (now the Democratic Republic of the Congo), and later moved to England at the age of seven. At 14, while being an active member of his father's choir, BM developed a fervent passion for music, taking inspiration from Werrason, Koffi Olomidé, and Papa Wemba.

He attended Carshalton College in Carshalton, England, where he obtained a BTEC national diploma in Music Technology in 2010. His commitment and enthusiasm were commended by his tutors, particularly his use of Additional Learner Support to strengthen his literacy skills. Your Local Guardian reported that he achieved top marks in his program. During his time at college, he also stayed very active outside the classroom. He helped start a music group called DRT with Sona and Mellie, and they went on to sign with a record label. DRT gained moderate success in the UK with their electro-rap single "Get Mad Now", which was released on 17 September 2010, and later became even more popular after being featured in a nationwide Specsavers advertisement. The next year, in 2011, BM was named among South London's top students and received the Best Learner Award, standing out among thousands of students from colleges across Croydon, Kingston, Bromley, Richmond, Sutton, and Merton. He received the award at the House of Lords on 18 May 2011. Alongside his studies, he served as a class representative, assisted with music equipment setup for college events, and produced graphic designs for the Music Technology department.

BM earned his Bachelor's degree in Music Technology with Upper Second Class (2:1) honors in 2012.

=== 2015–2017: "Lelo Eko Yinda" and Ebebi ===
BM later found his footing as a solo artist in the midsummer of 2012, incorporating bright Afro-pop tones in his early single "Lelo Eko Yinda". The song, which featured Sona, was well received and earned him the Best Song at the Congolese Achievement Awards in 2013.

A few years later, on 24 February 2015, he released his debut solo album, Ebebi, which consisted of 15 tracks. It included guest appearances by Dymunds, Will Son, DJ Leo, Champion, Freezah Sterling, and Yemo. The album's eponymous ndombolo-inspired lead single quickly went viral online, with many influencers sharing dance videos and encouraging others to join in. The accompanying London-shot music video, directed by Sam Kirk, included dancers like Sheryl Isako, Ceecee, Gugu, Junior Drogba, Detroit model SupaWoman, Valentine Artiste, Mad Dog, and Freezah. Speaking to the Jamaica Star, BM said he was thrilled to see people worldwide dancing to his music. His publicist, Malaika, remarked that the ndombolo-inspired dance craze was rapidly spreading and could become the next significant global phenomenon. Meanwhile, "Makolongulu", first released as a standalone single before appearing on Ebebi, achieved moderate success and features a tempo of 113 BPM in the key of E major.

=== 2018–2019: from "Makolongulu" remix to "Rosalina" ===
On 7 February 2018, BM premiered a remix of "Makolongulu", featuring Ugandan singer Eddy Kenzo. The video, directed by Martin Beta and filmed on the streets of Kampala, included a guest performance by the Ugandan Hyper Dancers troupe. The remix was a massive hit in Uganda and Kenya.

On 24 June, he debuted the single "Rosalina", which signifies "break your back". The song quickly gained a strong online following through the viral #Rosalinadancechallenge and was featured in BBC What's New. Prominent figures, including Congolese-British comedian Eddie Kadi, joined the challenge, performing ndombolo-inspired dance movements, characterized by energetic, full-body motions involving the legs, arms, and waist that followed the song's rhythmic tempo.

On 13 December, BM guest-performed on Assi So-La's single "Gwara Nao Para", which went on to become his most-streamed track on Spotify, surpassing 6 million streams. On 25 December, he released a remix of "Rosalina" featuring Awilo Longomba, which garnered broad acclaim and set off a chain of dance challenge videos similar to the original. The remix made the "Top 10 hits that made people dance in 2018" list by Music in Africa. The song's popularity allowed BM to tour internationally, performing in countries including the United States, Australia, Belgium, Canada, Germany, the Netherlands, and France.

=== 2020–2024: Standalone releases ===
On 6 March 2020, BM dropped the ndombolo-inspired single "How Low (Anita)", characterized by the genre's trademark rhythm and guitar, accompanied by a video directed by Lester Kunai and filmed in Paris. A month later, on 14 April, while Western musicians were increasingly "sampling and recycling Congolese guitar riffs into uninspired pop and urban tracks", BM released "Kanda", an ndombolo single with Celeo Scram. In his review for African cultural platform Djolonet, critic Aodren described the track as featuring "sharp, well-cut guitar line, a vibrant atmosphere, frothy percussion, and bits of vocals woven between dedications and fiery dance calls". The song quickly gained attention for its upbeat choreography in the video and its viral #KandaChallenge. BM later followed up with "Mabe" on 2 August 2021, and "Ye Le" on 6 October, with the latter going viral through the trending #YeleChallenge. Later releases included "Nyla" (2023), the instrumental "Intro" (2023), and "Selfie" (2024).

== Other ventures ==
BM serves as a director of the dating show Pop the Balloon or Find Love, hosted by his wife Arlette Amuli. The program features a panel of singles who decide whether to continue engaging with a contestant by keeping their balloon intact or "popping" it to indicate disinterest. The show airs weekly on YouTube.

In April 2025, a live adaptation titled Pop The Balloon Live premiered on Netflix, hosted by actress Yvonne Orji. BM and Arlette Amuli served as executive producers, alongside Bonnie Biggs, Dan Adler, Ellen Rocamora, and Matt Sharp.

On 6 July, BM and Amuli launched a Lingala-language edition of Pop the Balloon or Find Love in the Democratic Republic of the Congo, followed by an English-language edition in the United Kingdom on 15 October.

In March 2026, the couple launched Luv or Pop, a dating app modeled on the balloon-popping concept of their show. Rather than swiping between profiles, users keep balloons for potential matches and pop those representing people they are not interested in. The app also includes Match Lock, a feature that suspends other conversations when two users choose to pursue their connection exclusively.

== Personal life ==
BM married Arlette Amuli, a Congolese-American from Arizona, in 2021, and the couple has one child.

== Discography ==
=== Album ===
- 2016: Ebebi

=== Singles ===
- 2016: MISTEK ft. BM — Na Na Na
- 2017: Koka-Kola
- 2017: Whine It Slow remix ft. Sona
- 2017: Shake That Body ft. Rarity Music
- 2017: No Congo No Phone
- 2018: Pa Salieu ft. BM — Never Had
- 2018: Makolongulu remix ft. Eddy Kenzo
- 2018: Assi ft. BM — Gwara Nao Para
- 2018: Rosalina (Break Your Back)
- 2018: Rosalina remix ft. Runtown
- 2018: Rosalina remix ft. Awilo Longomba
- 2019: Bako Mona ft. Mistos Capitano
- 2019: Koloko ft. NESTREYA
- 2019: Bi Landa Landa ft. Robinio Mundibu
- 2020: Lazola Coach ft. BM — No Lazola No Gain
- 2020: How Low (Anita)
- 2020: Kanda ft. Celeo Scram
- 2021: Akay ft. BM — Flexing
- 2021: Ye Le
- 2021: Mabe
- 2021: Bina Bina ft. Campmasters
- 2022: Jaloux ft. Alfred Solo
- 2023: Nyla
