= Arlette Amuli =

American social media personality and executive producer

- Born: July 15, 1995 (age 31); Democratic Republic of the Congo
- Occupations: Content creator; social media personality; executive producer
- Spouse: Bolia Matundu (m. 2021)
- Children: 1

YouTube information
- Channel: Arlette Amuli
- Years active: 2011–present
- Subscribers: 1.6M million
- Views: 374 million
- Last updated: August 5, 2026

Arlette Amuli (born July 15, 1995) is an American content creator, social media personality, and producer. She is best known as the host of the YouTube dating show Pop the Balloon or Find Love and as an executive producer of its Netflix live adaptation, Pop The Balloon Live. Amuli is married to musician Bolia Matundu (BM).

== Early life and career ==
Arlette Amuli was born on July 15, 1995, in the Democratic Republic of the Congo. She first gained public attention through her relationship with Congolese-born British artist Bolia Matundu (professionally known as BM). The two first met in Phoenix during BM's 2018 U.S. tour, when Amuli attended a meet-and-greet as a fan, and they quickly bonded over their shared Congolese background. They initially spoke in Lingala before discovering that they both spoke English.

Amuli made her entertainment debut in the Awilo Longomba-featured remix video for BM's "Rosalina", where her appearance at the shoot deepened BM's interest in her, with CNN reporting that he had "started to see her differently". After returning to London, they communicated daily through FaceTime before Matundu returned to Phoenix two weeks later to ask her to be his girlfriend. After two years of long-distance dating, the couple married in 2021.

=== Pop the Balloon or Find Love, dating expectations and relationship outcomes ===
During the COVID-19 pandemic, social media experienced a boom in homemade dating content. Inspired by viral "pop the balloon" challenges, BM developed a more structured version of the concept aimed at a mature, working-class audience, and proposed that Amuli take on the hosting role. Though new to hosting, she accepted the offer. BM invested $1,500 in camera equipment, and they launched the YouTube series Pop the Balloon or Find Love. The first episode aired on December 7, 2023, with Amuli as host and BM as director and co-executive producer. The show's concept centered around brief, high-stakes speed-dating rounds in which participants held red balloons that could be popped to indicate rejection. BM told Essense that "the first two episodes were difficult" since he had to personally recruit participants, but afterward, "it was automatic", as the format's simplicity and emotional immediacy quickly resonated with audiences. As reported by HotNewHipHop writer A. Aron, the show's viral appeal came from its "rawness", with the sound of a balloon popping making rejections more immediate and dramatic.

Clips from the show spread rapidly across YouTube and TikTok, getting people talking online about dating culture and modern relationships. Within weeks, the series became one of the most-watched programs on Amuli's channel. Building on the success, Amuli and BM expanded the franchise by launching the Catch Up podcast, where they checked back in with couples who had met through the show and shared updates on their relationships. By mid-2024, Pop the Balloon or Find Love had turned into a major viral trend across social media. Prominent internet personalities, including FaZe Clan members and streamer Kai Cenat, created their own versions of the format in July 2024. Later that year, in December 2024, the British collective Sidemen also released a similar special, which boosted the format's reach to even more international viewers. The blend of emotional tension, humor, and striking visuals made the format a standout example of modern online dating entertainment. Earlier, in August 2024, Amuli and BM signed with the Creative Artists Agency (CAA) to expand the franchise into television, podcasting, and commercial collaborations.

According to CNN Global Productions producer Lauren Lee, viral clips reinforce stereotypes about Black relationships by focusing on rejection, superficial judgments, and arguments. BM explained that these perceptions often come from short videos shared online without the context of the full episodes, while Amuli said such excerpts omit the humor, personal stories, and emotional connections shown in the complete episodes. Both also pointed out that people often make snap judgments, with some contestants rejecting others based on physical appearance and first impressions. Los Angeles-based marriage and family therapist Kiaundra Jackson similarly argued that dating apps and social media can encourage people to make quick decisions about others, saying that "the first impression becomes the final decision". Jackson also noted that attraction can grow as people learn more about each other's personality, values, sense of humor, and emotions.

BM argues that unrealistic expectations and rigid partner preferences are major obstacles in modern dating. Jackson agrees, noting that high standards for appearance, income, and success can make it harder to find someone compatible. She stresses that connecting with someone matters more than finding a partner who meets every expectation. BM also shared that some contestants who reject each other during filming keep in touch afterward, and some even end up dating. Jackson explained that people may make snap judgments because of pressure from others and the cameras, while interactions outside that environment may allow stronger connections to develop. She also noted that online posts about arguments between Black men and women can make these problems seem worse, as "conflict gets clicks". Although she believes these posts can overshadow positive examples of Black relationships, Jackson acknowledges that dating frustrations are real and has observed greater openness to dating outside one's racial group. BM rejects the notion that Black singles should give up on finding partners within their community, pointing out the show's four marriages, more than 10 engagements, and dozens of other relationships as signs that these connections are possible.

=== Pop The Balloon Live on Netflix ===
Building on the digital success, Netflix commissioned a live adaptation titled Pop The Balloon Live, which premiered in April 2025. The series is hosted by Nigerian-American actress Yvonne Orji and produced by Amuli and BM alongside Bonnie Biggs, Dan Adler, Ellen Rocamora, and Matt Sharp. Though credited as executive producers, Amuli and BM said they had "little creative input" in the Netflix adaptation. Some fans and critics argued that "celebrity cameos, a rowdier vibe, and production changes" undermined the original YouTube series' intimacy and cultural nuance. The original series continued on YouTube.

=== Democratic Republic of the Congo and the UK editions ===
On July 6, 2025, Amuli and BM launched a Lingala-language edition of Pop the Balloon or Find Love in the Democratic Republic of the Congo, followed by an English-language edition in the United Kingdom on October 15, 2025. Both editions are hosted by Congolese-born British content creator and YouTuber Dymund. The Congolese edition has been described as more outspoken than its American counterpart, with Amuli and BM noting contestants' direct approach.

=== Luv or Pop ===
In March 2026, the couple launched the dating app Luv or Pop, which adapts the show's balloon-popping format for online dating. Instead of swiping left or right, users collect balloons for people they are interested in and pop balloons for those they're not. Its Match Lock feature temporarily closes off other conversations when a pair agrees to focus on one another.

== Personal life ==
Amuli has been married to BM since 2021, and the couple has one child.
