= Turtle Man =

Turtle Man may refer to:

- Ernie Lee Brown, Jr., nicknamed "The Turtle Man", whose exploits are the subject of the Animal Planet series Call of the Wildman
- Turtle (comics), two villains who appear in comic books published by DC Comics as enemies of the Flash, the second one also called Turtle Man
