= Nancy Sharp =

Nancy Sharp may refer to:

- Nancy Spender, née Sharp, British painter
- Nancy Weatherly Sharp, American academic and author
