= Ama de-Graft Aikins =

Ghanaian academic and psychology researcher

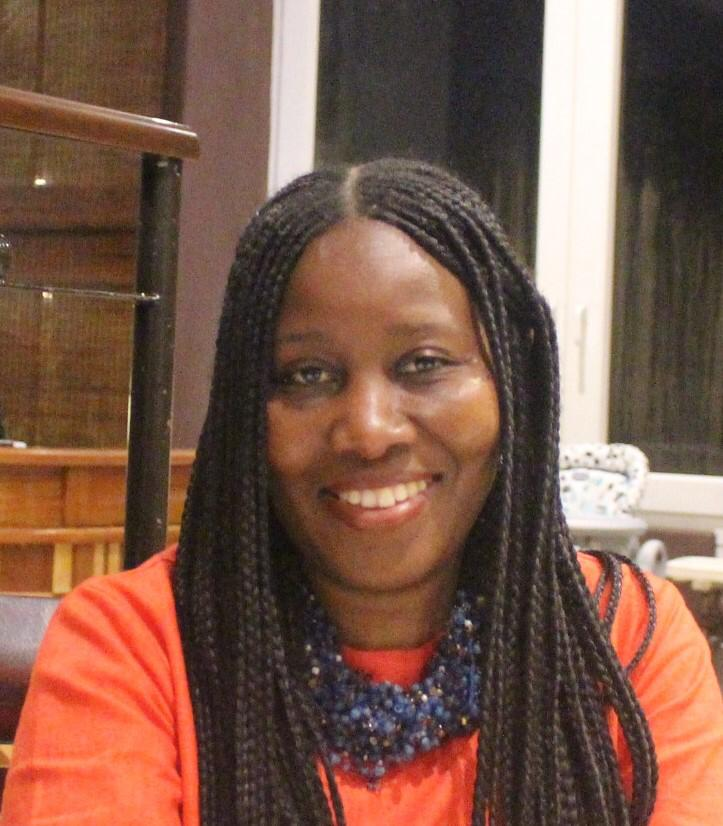
- Born: London, England
- Education: University of Cambridge; London School of Economics and Political Science; Manchester Metropolitan University; University of Manchester
- Scientific career
- Fields: Social psychology, public health and global health
- Workplaces: University College London; University of Ghana; University of Cambridge; London School of Economics and Political Science
- Thesis: Social representations of diabetes in Ghana: reconstructing self, society and culture (http://etheses.lse.ac.uk/id/eprint/2905) (2005)
- Doctoral advisor: Catherine Campbell
- Website: https://www.ucl.ac.uk/institute-of-advanced-studies/people/professor-ama-de-graft-aikins https://chronicitycareafrica.com/

Ama de-Graft Aikins is a British-Ghanaian social psychologist who is currently a British Academy Global Professor at University College London's Institute of Advanced Studies. Her research focuses primarily on the psychosocial and structural drivers of Africa's chronic non-communicable disease burden, but she also has interests in arts and health, and the history of psychology in Africa and its intersections with critical theory and African Studies. She has held teaching and research positions at the University of Cambridge, London School of Economics and Political Science and the University of Ghana. In 2015, she became the first female full professor of psychology at the University of Ghana, where she has a tenured position.

== Early life and education ==
Ama de-Graft Aikins was born in London, England, to Ghanaian parents. She had her secondary school education at Wesley Girls High School, Cape Coast, Ghana, and South Thames College, London. After a first degree in pharmacology at the University of Manchester, she switched disciplines and completed a conversion master's degree in psychology at Manchester Metropolitan University. She received her doctorate degree (PhD) in Social Psychology from the London School of Economics and Political Science, and completed her postdoctoral training at the University of Cambridge.

== Research ==
Ama de-Graft Aikins has led, and collaborated on, interdisciplinary non-communicable disease (NCD) research projects based in Africa and Europe, including the UK-Africa Academic Partnership on Chronic Disease and the RODAM Project.

She serves on several boards and advisory groups, including the board of Partnership for African Social Governance Research (PASGR), the Independent Advisory Board of PEBL West Africa, and the Scientific Advisory Board of the World Pandemic Research Network.

=== Selected publications ===
Ama de-Graft Aikins has published on chronic illness representations and experiences in Ghanaian communities and on Africa's NCD burden, and she has (co)edited journal and book volumes on these themes. Her work has been featured in the UK Guardian newspaper, the Global Journal, British Medical Journal and Lancet Psychiatry.

Selected publications include:

- de-Graft Aikins, A (2021). "A too familiar threat". New Scientist, 3327, 27 March 2021. doi:10.1016/S0262-4079(21)00514-5
- de-Graft Aikins, A. (2020). "'Colonial virus'? Creative arts and public understanding of COVID-19 in Ghana". Journal of the British Academy, Vol. 8, 401–413. https://doi.org/10.5871/jba%2F008.401
- de-Graft Aikins, A, Dodoo, F., Awuah, R.B., Owusu-Dabo, E., Addo, J et al. (2019). "Knowledge and perceptions of type 2 diabetes among Ghanaian migrants in three European countries and Ghanaians in rural and urban Ghana: the RODAM qualitative study". PLOS ONE 14(4): doi:10.1371/journal.pone.0214501
- Sanuade, O., Dodoo, F., Koram, K., de-Graft Aikins, A. (2019). "Explanatory Models of Stroke in Ghana: Perspectives of Stroke Survivors and their Caregivers". Ethnicity and Health. doi:10.1080/13557858.2018.1557116
- Boatemaa, S., Badasu, D., and de-Graft Aikins, A. (2018). "Food beliefs and practices in urban poor communities in Accra: implications for diet and health interventions". BMC Public Health. 18:434. doi:10.1186/s12889-018-5336-6

=== Books ===
- de-Graft Aikins, A and Agyemang, C. (eds) (2016). Chronic non-communicable diseases in low and middle income countries. Oxon: CABI Publishers.
- Agyemang, C., and A. de-Graft Aikins (eds). (2014). Culture, Ethnicity and Chronic Conditions: A Global Synthesis. London: Routledge/Taylor and Francis Group.
- de-Graft Aikins, A., Agyei-Mensah, S., Agyemang, C. (eds). (2013), Ghana's Chronic Non-communicable disease burden: multidisciplinary perspectives. Accra: Sub Saharan Publishers.

== Awards and honors ==
In 2019, Ama de-Graft Aikins was inducted as an international member of the US National Academy of Medicine. Her citation read: "For research that contributed to the development of unique interdisciplinary models to address Africa's chronic non-communicable disease burden" Other awards and honours include:

- Fellow, Ghana Academy of Arts and Sciences, 2016
- LSE African Initiative Fellow, 2013
- Aspen Ideas Festival Scholar, 2009 (Nominated by the African Leadership Initiative (ALI))
- Economic and Social Research Council (ESRC) Postdoctoral Fellow, 2005–2006
