= Pop the Balloon or Find Love =

- Also known as: Pop the Balloon Live
- Genre: Dating game show
- Presented by: Yvonne Orji
- Country of origin: United States
- Original language: English
- No. of seasons: 1
- No. of episodes: 8

Production
- Executive producers: Arlette Amuli; Bolia Matundu; Bonnie Biggs; Dan Adler; Ellen Rocamora; Matt Sharp
- Production companies: Sharp Entertainment; BM&AM Entertainment

Original release
- Network: Netflix
- Release: April 10, 2025 – present

Pop the Balloon or Find Love is a dating show where someone is evaluated by a panel of other singles, who "pop" a balloon if they are not interested. It airs weekly on YouTube. In April 2025, a live version of the show began airing on Netflix. Titled Pop The Balloon Live, it is hosted by actress Yvonne Orji.

== Episodes ==
No.	Title	Original release date
1	"Get It Poppin'"	April 10, 2025
2	"Pop It Like It's Hot"	April 17, 2025
3	"Pop, Lock & Drop It"	April 24, 2025
4	"Big Pop Energy"	May 1, 2025
5	"I'm Unpoppable"	May 8, 2025
6	"Pop Off"	May 15, 2025
7	"In Our Pop Era"	May 22, 2025
8	"No Pops To Give"	May 29, 2025

== Viewership ==
According to data from Showlabs, Pop the Balloon Live ranked ninth on Netflix in the United States during the week of 7–13 April 2025.
