= Goldy Locks =

American singer (born 1979)

- Also known as: Goldylocks
- Born: Moon Shadow
- Genres: Alternative rock; rock
- Occupations: Singer; pro wrestling manager
- Years active: 1999–present
- Label: Futuristic

Moon Shadow is an American singer and professional wrestler, known as Goldylocks or Goldy Locks.

== Post-wrestling television career ==
Since leaving TNA, Shadow has appeared on a number of television programs. In 2009, she appeared on the CMT show Running Wild...With Ted Nugent. Following that, in 2014, she appeared on an episode of Extreme Cheapskates, which airs on TLC. Appearing with her band, she showcased the ways in which she saves money on the road, as well as how she goes about her crafting. She has also been a video contributor for the CBS show The Talk.
