= Extreme Cheapskates =

American reality television series

- Genre: Reality
- Country of origin: United States
- Original language: English
- No. of seasons: 3
- No. of episodes: 26

Production
- Running time: 22 minutes
- Production company: Sharp Entertainment

Original release
- Network: TLC
- Release: October 16, 2012 – November 19, 2014

Extreme Cheapskates is an American reality television series that aired on TLC and premiered on October 16, 2012. It documents the lives of those who take frugality to an extreme. TLC aired the series' pilot episode in December 2011, and ordered a six episode first season on February 23, 2012. Season 2 premiered on October 30, 2013.

== Episodes ==
Season	Episodes	Originally released	
Season	Episodes	First released	Last released
Pilot		December 28, 2011	
1	6	October 16, 2012	October 30, 2012
2	8	October 30, 2013	November 27, 2013
3	12	September 24, 2014	November 19, 2014

=== Pilot ===
No.	Title	Original air date	Production code	U.S. viewers (million)
0	"Pilot"	December 28, 2011	100-60	1.61

=== Season 1 (2012) ===
No. overall	No. in season	Title	Original release date	Prod. code	U.S. viewers (millions)
1	1	"Kate Hashimoto"	October 16, 2012	101	1.28
2	2	"Terence Candell/Greg Insco"	October 16, 2012	102	1.23
3	3	"Victoria Hunt"	October 23, 2012	103	1.00
4	4	"Abdul Mohammed & Vickie Smith"	October 23, 2012	104	1.09
5	5	"Jeff Yeager"	October 30, 2012	105	0.93
6	6	"Roy Haynes & Ben Livingston"	October 30, 2012	106	0.98

=== Season 2 (2013) ===
No. overall	No. in season	Title	Original release date	U.S. viewers (millions)
7	1	"Rick & Karissa Parran/Torski Dobson-Arnold"	October 30, 2013	1.33
8	2	"Shelly (Shelly Watson, Ashley Watson)"	October 30, 2013	1.59
9	3	"Angel Durr/Mark Parisi"	November 6, 2013	1.04
10	4	"Melody Rose/Marlin Thomas"	November 6, 2013	1.14
11	5	"Matt Rivera/Sarah Gracel-Anderson"	November 13, 2013	1.24
12	6	"The O'Briens"	November 13, 2013	1.48
13	7	"Jordan Page/Michael McSurley"	November 20, 2013	1.14
14	8	"Stephanie Bennett/Larry Melvin"	November 27, 2013	N/A

=== Season 3 (2014) ===
No. overall	No. in season	Title	Original release date	U.S. viewers (millions)
15	1	"Hats Off To You Fella"	September 24, 2014	N/A
16	2	"In Sickness and In Wealth (Karen & Barry Hearn)"	October 1, 2014	N/A
17	3	"All Wrapped Up"	October 1, 2014	N/A
18	4	"Home Is Where The Cart Is (Steffanie Rivers, RJ Andrews)"	October 8, 2014	0.81
19	5	"Cheap Hair Day (Kelley Watson, Pelin Mathis)"	October 8, 2014	N/A
20	6	"Father Knows Debt (Raul Pinto, Patricia Pinto, Nicholas Pinto, Kia Cambridge)"	October 15, 2014	1.01
21	7	"Pool Rules: No Spending (Jeni Cox, Lisa DiMercurio)"	October 15, 2014	1.27
22	8	"Nobody Pays Retail (Lydia Abate, Mason Roberts)"	October 22, 2014	0.81
23	9	"The Grass Is Always Cheaper (Jamie Jay, Justin Woodhouse)"	October 29, 2014	0.89
24	10	"Feast or Famine (Goldy Locks, Ron Maestri)"	November 5, 2014	0.86
25	11	"Diving for Dollars (Anne Marie, Peter Anthony)"	November 12, 2014	N/A
26	12	"Vacations"	November 19, 2014	0.85

== Reception ==
Allison Keene of The Hollywood Reporter said fans of Hoarders won't be disappointed by the show. Melissa Camacho of Common Sense Media gave the show 2 out of 5 stars.

The show has seen popularity online, such as on YouTube and Facebook as clips have been seen going viral on various platforms. YouTubers such as KallMeKris, PutWoodleyIn, That One Wannabe, and PewDiePie have all made videos reacting to the show's episodes absurdity and money pinching tactics.

== See also ==
- Miser
- Extreme Couponing
