= Fast Food Mania =

- Directed by: Meghan Smith
- Starring: Jon Hein
- Country of origin: United States
- No. of seasons: 1
- No. of episodes: 10

Production
- Executive producers: Alison Mouledoux; Fay Yu; Matt Sharp
- Running time: 30 minutes
- Production company: Sharp Entertainment

Original release
- Network: Destination America
- Release: June 3 – July 25, 2012

Fast Food Mania is an American television series that aired in the United States on Destination America. The series premiered on June 3, 2012 and ended on July 25, 2012, with a total of 10 episodes over the course of 1 season.

== Premise ==
The series features its host, Jon Hein, traveling around the United States and visiting various fast food restaurants. Hein discusses the history of the restaurants, along with how their food is prepared. For example, Hein may visit the cities of a restaurant's origin (such as Corbin, Kentucky for Kentucky Fried Chicken), or the restaurant's headquarters (such as Taco Bell headquarters in Irvine, California). Meghan Smith directed the series.

Fast-food chains avoided airing commercials during the show. They were concerned that the impact of their ad would be diminished when the show profiled a competitor. The first episode featured White Castle, Whataburger, Chick-fil-A, McDonald's, Burger King, and KFC.

== Episodes ==
No.	Title	Original release date
1	"Cult Classics"	June 3, 2012
Devoted fast food customers are profiled. Restaurants featured: White Castle, Whataburger, and Chick-fil-A.
2	"Beyond the Bun"	June 3, 2012
Jon focus on fast food items that are hamburger alternatives. Restaurants featured: Kentucky Fried Chicken, Domino's Pizza, and Taco Bell.
3	"The Drive-Thru"	June 10, 2012
Jon tries to find the fastest drive-thru in the country and see if the drive-thru is faster than ordering inside. He also visits the most extreme drive-thrus. Restaurants featured: Wendy's, Jet Bar-B-Q Kansas City, Cowgirls Espresso, Starbucks, and Kentucky Fried Chicken.
4	"Extreme Burgers"	June 17, 2012
Jon searches the country trying to find the most extreme hamburgers. Restaurants featured: Five Guys, Wendy's, and Fatburger.
5	"Fast Food Originals"	July 11, 2012
Jon travels to the original restaurants of popular American fast food chains. Restaurants featured: Dunkin' Donuts, A&W, and Nathan's Famous.
6	"Extreme Menu Items"	July 11, 2012
Jon searches for the most extreme fast food menu items. Restaurants featured: Kentucky Fried Chicken, Hardee's/Carl's Jr., and Elevation Burger.
7	"Fast Food Tech"	July 18, 2012
Jon looks for the most innovated fast food preparation technology. Restaurants featured: Carl's Jr., Chick-fil-A, and Krispy Kreme.
8	"Breakfast for Fast Food Champions"	July 18, 2012
Fast food breakfast items are profiled. Restaurants featured: Dunkin' Donuts, Sonic Drive-In, and Cinnabon.
9	"Extra Special Service"	July 25, 2012
Some Fast Food places will go so far out of their way to serve their customers, you'll want to re-think getting that food to go! Watch how White Castle, Sonic and Dairy Queen exceed all expectations and really bring you that extra special service.
10	"Extreme Locations"	July 25, 2012
From amazing beach front real estate, to the greenest fast food joint in the country, to behind the maximum security walls of the Pentagon, fast food can be found in some of the most surprising and unique locations on Earth.
