= Call of the Wildman =

American reality television series (2011–2014)

- Also known as: The Turtleman of Wild Kentucky; Call of the Wildman: More Live Action
- Starring: Ernie Brown, Jr. (aka "The Turtleman"); Neal James
- Country of origin: United States
- Original language: English
- No. of seasons: 4
- No. of episodes: 72

Production
- Executive producers: Andrew Sharp; Dawn Sinsel
- Production location: Lebanon, Kentucky
- Running time: 30 minutes
- Production company: Sharp Entertainment

Original release
- Network: Animal Planet
- Release: October 30, 2011 – September 14, 2014

Call of the Wildman is an American reality television series that aired on Animal Planet from October 30, 2011, to September 14, 2014. The show followed the exploits of Kentucky woodsman Ernie Brown Jr., nicknamed "The Turtleman". Aided by his friend, Neal James, and his dog, Lolly, Brown operated a nuisance animal removal business, catching and releasing nuisance animals. The series was primarily filmed near Brown's Lebanon, Kentucky, home.

Brown began catching snapping turtles from ponds near his home at the age of 7. He came to the attention of Animal Planet producers in part after an episode of Kentucky Educational Television's Kentucky Afield series that featured his bare-handed turtle-catching techniques was posted on YouTube and went viral. After personally visiting Brown and doing some initial filming, network executives decided to produce a 12-episode season of the series with the working title The Turtleman of Wild Kentucky. The title was soon changed to Call of the Wildman, a reference to Brown's distinctive yell that punctuates his actions throughout the series. The series was Animal Planet's most watched program in the fourth quarter of 2011 and was renewed for a second, 16-episode series that began airing in June 2012. In October 2012, Animal Planet re-released the series with bonus features and trivia information known as Call of the Wildman: More Live Action.

Call of the Wildman has been compared to other reality series featuring individuals from the Southern United States such as Billy the Exterminator, Duck Dynasty, Swamp People, and Rocket City Rednecks. Because it depicts Brown's spartan existence in the backwoods of Kentucky, some poverty advocacy groups have expressed concerns that it exploits stereotypical views of Southerners as being poorly educated, poorly groomed, and impoverished. Network executives insist, however, that they have received no negative feedback about the program.

Season 4 began on August 24, 2014.

== Development ==
In 2006, the Kentucky Educational Television series Kentucky Afield devoted a portion of their weekly hunting and fishing oriented show to Brown and his turtle catching. The segment was posted on YouTube and went viral; as of June 2012, it had garnered more than 4 million hits. Among those who viewed the videos were NASCAR drivers David Ragan and Carl Edwards; Brown credits Edwards with introducing him to an entertainment lawyer and an agent. The video and a similar one posted on the web site of the Lexington Herald-Leader newspaper also attracted the attention of television producer Matt Sharp of Sharp Entertainment. Brown relates that, while performing as a sideshow at the Mothman Festival in Point Pleasant, West Virginia, a group of executives from Sharp Entertainment and Animal Planet, who were there on an unrelated assignment, approached him about doing a television show. The executives told Brown that they had been trying to get in touch with him for over a year, but that his fellow performers had refused to deliver their messages to him.

In November 2010, Sharp sent a camera crew to film some of Brown's exploits. After seeing the footage, a producer from Animal Planet visited Brown and challenged him to "entertain [her] for 12 hours". Brown told the Herald-Leader that he took the producer on an outing in which he caught 11 turtles and a catfish. Following the producer's visit, Animal Planet decided to air a series of 12 half-hour episodes featuring Brown. Originally given the working title The Turtleman of Wild Kentucky, the name was changed to Call of the Wildman – a reference to Brown's signature yell. Brown describes the yell as "an Indian yell" and explains, "I got a quarter Shawnee and a quarter Cherokee. The other quarter is white man – that's a Yankee, Union – and another quarter is Confederate". In addition, Brown frequently uses the catchphrase "Live action!" during the series. He explains that "'Live action' means there's no faking. People have been calling me fake, and there ain't no fake. Go ahead and try it! We're doing it live action."

== Premise ==
Despite his "Turtleman" nickname, Brown caught all types of nuisance animals on the show, including raccoons, skunks, snakes, venomous spiders, and possums. His animal catching technique is designed to protect both himself and the animal from harm. Once he captured an animal, he relocated it to a safer location in the wild. For his services, he typically only received an amount sufficient to cover the cost of gasoline to drive to and from his destination.

In each episode of Call of the Wildman, Brown was accompanied by his best friend, Neal James, and his dog, Lolly. James serves as the secretary for Brown's business, fielding telephone calls from individuals in need of his services. Lolly has been Brown's pet ever since he rescued her from wandering the streets in the aftermath of a 2009 ice storm. He doesn't know her exact breed, but he believes her to be part Border Collie and part Australian Cattle Dog. Some episodes also feature other friends who help Brown – "Turtle Team" – including handyman Jake Ison and David "Squirrel" Brady. In some cases involving rats and the like, Brown also enlisted the help of a rat snake that lived on or near his property, Sir Lancelot. The snake died of unknown causes, possibly old age, in an episode aired in late 2014.

After a seven-month investigation, Mother Jones published an exposé of the show which includes testimony and supporting evidence that the crew obtained an opossum from a wildlife rescue in order to fake a supposed wildlife infestation at a fraternity house in Lexington, and that an infant raccoon died from an apparent lack of appropriate food and medical care after being in the possession of Ernie Brown for several days amongst numerous other actions alleged against Brown and crew.

== Reception ==
A 2012 press release from Animal Planet announced that Call of the Wildman was the network's most popular show in the fourth quarter of 2011, garnering almost 780,000 viewers, and had been renewed for a second season consisting of 16 episodes, including a special episode to air during the network's "Monster Week". The release further noted that, in the second season, the show would film in locations other than Kentucky, naming Louisiana as an example. The episode "Baby Mama Drama", which aired July 8, 2012, set a record for the show's largest audience ever, an estimated 1.6 million, according to the network.

The popularity of Call of the Wildman has prompted Brown's appearance on several television programs, including two visits to The Tonight Show. Shortly after telling his hometown newspaper, the Lebanon Enterprise that he wanted to meet CNN news anchor Anderson Cooper, Brown was invited to appear on an episode of Cooper's show, Anderson Cooper 360°. He told the paper he still has a dream of being on the cover of Rolling Stone.

Associated Press writer Dylan Lovan pointed out that Call of the Wildman was part of a growing number of similarly themed reality shows that included Animal Planet's Hillbilly Handfishin', A&E's Billy the Exterminator, Duck Dynasty, History's Swamp People. The Washington Post's Roger Catlin pointed out that many of the shows feature individuals from the Southern United States and include pejorative terms like "redneck" and "hillbilly" in their titles; in addition to "Hillbilly Handfishin'", he cited National Geographic Channel's Rocket City Rednecks and CMT's My Big Redneck Vacation. Lovan noted that "Brown fits the mold of the distinct Southern characters who populate cable TV", noting that he lives in a small home with no television or phone service, is missing his front teeth, and carries a foot-long Bowie knife he nicknamed "Thunder".

Ted Ownby of the Center for the Study of Southern Culture stated that he believes producers of shows such as Call of the Wildman "build on preexisting stereotypes, so they don't need to build characters", and added that "people of the South get frustrated at the narrow range of representations [of them]". Dee Davis, president of the Center for Rural Strategies, expressed his concern that the shows approach "the thin line between an honest documentary and exploitative reality show". Animal Planet president Marjorie Kaplan insisted, "We haven't received any negative response at all" to the show. Commenting on the potential for the show to advance negative stereotypes of Southerners, Animal Planet executive Dawn Sinsel added, "As with all shows that explore a subculture of America that people might not be familiar with, we're careful to make sure that we represent the talent in their true colors and not 'cover up' their natural character. Turtleman likes to catch all types of animals. We hope Ernie's carefree and loyal personality and love of animals will replace any stereotypes." Brown himself commented "You either like the show and watch it, or you don't. I'm not doing anything wrong, just cheering people up."

== Controversy and aftermath ==
Critics of the series alleged that the scenarios and animal catching scenes featured on the show were scripted and faked using appropriated animals instead of naturally occurring events. Karen Bailey, founder of the Kentucky Wildlife Center, said that a 2012 episode of the show featuring Brown rescuing a family of raccoons trapped in a laundry room actually featured a male raccoon as the mother and baby raccoons obtained from two different locations. Following the episode, Bailey said the animals used for filming were brought to the center, where one of the babies died.

The premiere episode of the show's second season featured Brown removing two cottonmouth snakes from a public pool in Danville, Kentucky. After the show aired, the director of the Kentucky Reptile Zoo, Jim Harrison, stated that cottonmouths are not indigenous to the area where the scene was filmed and that the snakes must have been brought in for the show's filming; Animal Planet representatives denied the claim. The city later investigated and concluded that the snakes were placed in the pool by the show's crew, and that neither the crew nor the city parks department obtained the required approvals to do so.

Following the airing of the episode "Deer Destruction" in 2013, the Kentucky Department of Fish and Wildlife sent Brown a letter to remind him that his Nuisance Wildlife Control Officer (NWCO) permit did not allow him to handle deer. The department warned that any future violations could result in the revocation of his permit, a citation, or both. Brown's last NWCO license expired in February 2014, and the department refused to renew it because he had not fully documented his captures in 2013.

On January 21, 2014, the magazine Mother Jones alleged that Brown appeared to have falsified records submitted to the Kentucky Department of Fish and Wildlife about what was captured, released, and euthanized on Call of the Wildman. Both the Humane Society of the United States (HSUS) and People for the Ethical Treatment of Animals (PETA) demanded an investigation by the United States Department of Agriculture (USDA) regarding the allegations. In 2017, a USDA investigation concluded that the show exhibited a coyote, porcupines, raccoons, bats, armadillos and deer without a valid license in violation of the Animal Welfare Act. The main producer was fined $180,000, while an unnamed producer for the show was fined $1,800 for the violations.

After Brown lost his license, the show went off the air, but Brown and James continued to post animal rescue videos to YouTube and Facebook. James died on February 1, 2019, at age 55 from natural causes.

== Episodes ==
Re-runs of episodes are enhanced with facts and trivia with behind-the-scenes information, and even additional scenes. These are called "More Live Action" episodes.

=== Season 1 ===
Title	Original Air Date
"The Turtles of Alcatraz Pond"	October 30, 2011
"Dirty Jobs"	November 6, 2011
"Groundhog Day"	November 6, 2011
"Opossum Poltergeist"	November 13, 2011
"Fort Rattlesnake"	November 20, 2011
"Turtle Boot Camp"	November 20, 2011
"Trapped Underground"	November 27, 2011
"The Snake Pit"	December 4, 2011
"Nightmare at Poachers Pond"	December 11, 2011
"The Bayou Beast"	December 18, 2011
"Danger at the Distillery"	December 25, 2011
"Dilapidated Death Trap"	December 25, 2011

=== Season 2 ===
Title	Original Air Date
"Miner Threat"	June 3, 2012
"Killer at Shaker Village"	June 3, 2012
"Santa Claws"	June 10, 2012
"Beehive Massacre"	June 10, 2012
"Speedway Demons"	June 17, 2012
"Hell Hog"	June 24, 2012
"French Quarter Coyote"	July 1, 2012
"Baby Mama Drama"	July 8, 2012
"Jaws of Hell"	July 15, 2012
"Trailer Park Stink Bomb"	July 22, 2012
"Night of the Digging Dead"	July 29, 2012
"Sawmill Slasher"	August 5, 2012
"Tee'd Off Turtle"	August 19, 2012
"Pig Wallow Predator"	August 26, 2012
"Killer in the Cavern"	September 3, 2012
"Fairground Fiasco"	September 3, 2012
"Holler Day Cheer"	December 16, 2012

=== Season 3 ===
Title	Original Air Date
"Mama Llama Drama"	June 2, 2013
"All Skunked Up"	June 2, 2013
"Hook, Line and Snapper"	June 9, 2013
"Cat Killer"	June 9, 2013
"Deer Destruction"	June 16, 2013
"Freddy Critter's Revenge"	June 23, 2013
"12 Angry Pigeons"	June 30, 2013
"Savage Stowaways"	July 7, 2013
"Major League Menace"	July 14, 2013
"Lured Into Danger"	July 21, 2013
"Best Little Boar House In Texas"	July 28, 2013
"Bat Hair Day"	August 4, 2013
"Wild Receiver"	August 11, 2013
"Ernie Le'Pew"	August 18, 2013
"Lone Stars and Stripes"	August 25, 2013
"Viva Live Action!" (1-hour special)	September 2, 2013
"River Monster Mystery"	September 8, 2013
"The Bull and the Beautiful"	September 15, 2013
"Fur for the Course"	September 22, 2013
"Don't Leave it to Beaver"	September 29, 2013
"Get Otter My Pond"	October 6, 2013
"Apocalypse Meow"	October 13, 2013
"Mudzilla Attacks"	October 20, 2013
"Halloween Special"	October 27, 2013
"Smokey and the Bandit"	November 3, 2013
"Unarmed and Dangerous"	November 17, 2013
"The Crittersburg Address"	November 24, 2013
"Snake Town Shakedown"	December 1, 2013
"Chaos in Critter Cavern"	December 8, 2013
"Swine Dining"	December 15, 2013
"Turtleman Takes Manhattan"	December 22, 2013

=== Season 4 ===
Title	Original Air Date
"Phantom Menace"	June 8, 2014
"Snap 'n' Splash"	June 15, 2014
"Bear Necessities"	June 22, 2014
"Headless Horror"	June 29, 2014
"Kneel Before Sod"	July 6, 2014
"Troll in the Coal"	July 13, 2014
"Ghost Town Gold Rush"	July 20, 2014
"Fang Nabbit!"	August 10, 2014
"Tough Cookies"	August 17, 2014
"Trail Blazers"	August 24, 2014
"Ticked Off"	September 7, 2014
"Call in the Cavalry"	September 14, 2014
