= Love After Lockup =

US reality television series

- Genre: Reality
- Country of origin: United States
- Original language: English
- No. of seasons: 6
- No. of episodes: 270

Production
- Executive producers: Matt Sharp; Dan Adler; Alan Madison; Sara Hayworth; Sophie Mallam; Lauren P. Gellert; Kate Farrell
- Running time: 40–63 minutes
- Production company: Sharp Entertainment

Original release
- Network: We TV
- Release: January 12, 2018 – present

Love After Lockup is a reality television series, chronicling the lives of recently released felons and their significant others. It premiered on January 12, 2018, on We TV.

== Production ==
On December 7, 2017, We TV announced that Love After Lockup would premiere January 12, 2018. On February 9, 2018, the show was picked up for a second season, which premiered on December 7, 2018. On January 23, 2019, We TV extended the second season with additional episodes. These episode began airing from June 14, 2019, under the title Love After Lockup: Life After Lockup, which acts as a spin-off of the show.

On July 19, 2019, We TV announced that the second season of Love After Lockup would premiere on August 16, 2019. Both Love After Lockup and Love After Lockup: Life After Lockup were renewed for a second and third season respectively on November 20, 2019. On November 22, 2019, We TV announced that season 2 of Love After Lockup: Life After Lockup would air from January 3, 2020. On August 19, 2020, it was announced that the third season would premiere on September 11, 2020.

On June 25, 2020, it was announced that the third season would premiere on July 17, 2020.

On October 1, 2021, a new spin-off of the series, Love During Lockup, was announced. It premiered in January 2022.

On March 4, 2022, the fourth season premiered.

The sixth season of Love After Lockup premiered on March 21, 2025.

The seventh season of Love After Lockup premiered. All 8 episodes are streaming on Peacock (as of September 2026).

== Cast ==
=== Couples ===
Non-inmate	Inmate	Crime	Location	Season
Scott Davey †	Lizzie Kommes	9 years for DUI and bribery	Oxnard, California Portage, Wisconsin	1, 2.1, 2.2
Johnna DiGrigoli	Garrett Tanner	7 years for burglary, grand theft	Tampa, Florida	1
Andrea Edwards	Albert "Lamar" Jackson	18 years for robbery with a deadly weapon	Lehi, Utah Los Angeles, California	1, 2.2, 2.4, 3.2, 3.4
James Cristia	Alla Subbotina †	5 years for selling heroin	Chicago, Illinois Milwaukee, Wisconsin	1
Mary Dalla Nora	Dominic Dalla Nora	6 years for aggravated assault	Ontario, Canada	1
Angela Gail Ables	Antonio "Tony" Wood	3 years for possession of a firearm	Grenada, Mississippi	1, 2.3, 2.4, 3.2
Caitlin Gainer	Matt Frasier	2 years for possession of firearms, stolen property	Auburn, Washington	2.1
Megan Nash Sarah Simmons	Michael Simmons	2 years for parole violations	Fort Worth, Texas Rochester, New York	2.1, 2.2, 2.4, 3.2, 3.4
Clint Brady	Tracie Wagaman †	8 years for fraudulent checks and probation violation	Hobbs, New Mexico	2.1, 2.2, 2.4
Marcelino Santiago	Brittany Santiago	2 years for conspiracy to commit burglary	Las Vegas, Nevada St. Cloud, Florida	2.1, 2.2, 2.4, 3.2, 3.4, 3.6, 4.2, 4.5
Glorietta Besos	Alex Bentley	2 years for identity theft and burglary	Sacramento, California	2.3
Lizzy Copeland	Daniel Valentine	2 years for possession of narcotics	Idaho Falls, Idaho	2.3
Andrea Sylvester	Lamondre Fluker	13 years for drug trafficking	Daytona Beach, Florida	2.3
Lacey Whitlow	John Slater Shane Whitlow	1 year for possession of firearms 4 years for malicious wounding	Virginia Beach, Virginia	2.3, 2.4, 3.2, 3.4, 3.6
Cheryl Childers	Josh Hyatt	6 years for bank robbery	Pueblo, Colorado	2.3, 2.4
Vincent Gonzalez	Amber Eggers † Michelle "Puppy" Deaton	4 years for drug trafficking	Atlanta, Georgia	2.3, 3.4, 3.6, 4.2, 4.5
Jessica Gipson	Maurice Gipson	7 years for burglary	Las Vegas, Nevada	3.1, 3.3
Shawn Osborne	Destinie Folsom Sara Isaac	2 years for escape, stolen property, and possession of drugs 6 years for involuntary manslaughter	Las Vegas, Nevada Cincinnati, Ohio	3.1, 3.3, 3.4, 3.6, 4.2, 4.5, 5.2
John Miller	Kristianna Roth	3 years for burglary	Cresco, Iowa	3.1, 3.3, 3.4, 3.6
Scott Bradshaw Blaine Bailey	Lindsey Downs	4 years for possession of methamphetamine and a firearm	Olive Branch, Mississippi	3.1, 3.3, 3.4, 4.2, (Note: Lindsey Downs and Daonte Sierra were in a relationship in season 4.2. However, at the end of the season Downs broke up with Sierra for her longtime friend, Blaine Bailey.) 4.5, 5.2
Tyrice Sanders	Chanda Curls	3 years for conspiracy to distribute methamphetamine	Chicago, Illinois	3.1, 3.3
Shavel Rice-Moore	Quaylon Adams	12 years for armed robbery	Kansas City, Missouri	3.1, 3.3, 3.4, 5.2
Heather Gillespie	Dylan Smith	5 years for residential burglary and possession of ecstasy	Chicago, Illinois	3.1, 3.3
Daonte Sierra Tia Simmons	Nicolle Bradley	4 years for larceny	Virginia Beach, Virginia	3.5, 3.6, 4.2
Rachel	Doug Howard Jr.	4 years for possession of a firearm	Kalamazoo, Michigan	3.5
Stan Smith	Lisa McGraw	10 months for tampering with a motor vehicle and possession	St. Louis, Missouri	3.5, 3.6
Britney Reed	Ray Ford	3 years for possession with intent to deliver	Houston, Texas	3.5, 3.6, 4.2
Courtney Howard	Josh Howard	11 years for burglary and attempted assault	Urbana, Ohio	3.5
Anissa Lewis	Jeff Wombles	3 years for possession of a firearm	Manchester, Tennessee	3.5
Haley Cole	Dalton Edgin	burglary and evading arrest	Highland, Texas	3.7
Gabby Nieves	Chris Walker	6 years criminal weapon possession and controlled substance possession	Newark, New Jersey	3.7, 4.4
Tai Simpson Boston	Julian "Hottie" Beavers	possession with intent to distribute	Buffalo, New York	3.7, 4.3
Santiba Webb	Talsey McCullough	8 years for possession of a controlled substance	Portland, Maine	3.7
Max	Tara Medlock	possession of narcotics and opiates	Washington, D.C.	3.7
Indierra "Indie" Treadwell	Harry Velez	3 years for aggravated robbery and kidnapping	Cleveland, Ohio	3.7, 4.1
Tayler George	Chance Pitt	7 years for burglary and grand theft	Elsberry, Missouri	4.1, 4.2, 4.5, 5.2
Lacey Rodgers	Antoine Whitaker	3 years for possession of a stolen vehicle and DUI	Snohomish, Washington	4.1
Kevin Hale	Tiffany Bolton	5 years for possession of a controlled substance	Arlington, Texas	4.1, 4.2
Rick Ryder	Raydean Voight	5 years for possession of a controlled substance and evading arrest	Cedar Park, Texas	4.1
Kaylah Jackson	Martel Mubdi	13 years for drug and gun trafficking	Atlanta, Georgia	4.1
Charlie "Chazz" Harbison	Branwin Jones	3 years for aggravated identity theft	La Grange, Kentucky Portland, Oregon	4.1, 4.2
Justine Persaud	Michael Persaud	6 years for possession with intent to deliver	Johnstown, Pennsylvania	4.3, 4.4, 4.5, 5.2, 5.5
Melissa Leist	Louie	10 years for armed robbery	Atlantic Highlands, New Jersey	4.3, 5.1, 5.2, 5.5
Chelsea Gilliam	Michael "Mikey" Harmon	5 years for criminal mischief and receiving stolen property	Richwood, Ohio	4.3, 5.1
Emily Aschenbach	Dauri Cabrera	robbery	Union, New Jersey	4.3
Jessica	Dustin Phillips	possession and evading arrest	Jacksonville, Florida	4.3
Mark Wagner	Sincer-A Nerton	robbery, burglary, and kidnapping	Las Vegas, Nevada	4.3
Nathan Tracy	Skylar Rackley	2 years for drug possession and obstruction of justice	Zanesville, Ohio	4.4
Ashley Robinson	Travis Bernstein	13 years for armed bank robbery	Port St. Lucie, Florida	4.4
Monique Robinson	Derek Warner Jr.	9 years for drug possession and distribution	Chicago, Illinois Cleveland, Ohio	4.4, 4.5
Aris Morton	Cameron Morton	2 years for trafficking and possession of marijuana	Tampa, Florida	4.4, 4.5, 5.2
Jade Chipps	Chris Chipps	31 years for burglary and identity theft	Naples, Florida	4.6
LaTisha Collier	Keith Collier	14 years for drug distribution	Davenport, Iowa	4.6, 5.4
Britney Cruz Alvarado	Naykerah "Kerok" Galberth	robbery	Richmond, Virginia	4.6, 5.1, 5.2, 5.5
Savannah Moore	Jake	35 years for first degree robbery, theft, and possession	Iowa City, Iowa	4.6
William Andrew "Andy" Kidd	Brittney	drug possession	Rome, Georgia	4.6, 5.1
Raneka Hayes	Lacitrus "Asonta" Gholston †	4 years for robbery and grand theft auto	Louisville, Kentucky ————— Toccoa, Georgia	4.6, 5.1
Sharae Scott	Anthony	2nd degree robbery	Schenectady, NY	5.1
Joynomi Davis	Graylen “Redd” Noldon	10 years for 1st degree robbery	Farmington, NM	5.1, 5.2
Shonta Ashley	True	1st degree robbery	Independence, MO	5.3, 5.4
Hope	Arthur Henderson	Theft & Evading Arrest	Dallas, TX ————— San Bernardino, CA	5.4
Zeruiah Jones	Troy Jones	Criminal possession of a weapon and attempted robbery, 7 years	Syracuse, NY ————— Buffalo, NY	5.4, 5.5
Kim	Joey	Breaking and Entering, Larceny, Identity Theft, 6 years	Eden, NC	5.4, 5.5
Bianca DePalo	Daniel Valentine	Aggravated DUI, 3rd Degree Burglary, 4 years	Dania Beach, FL ————— Phoenix, AZ	5.4, 5.5
Julian	Christine	Bank Robbery, 5.5 Years	Annapolis, MD ————— Parkersburg, WV	5.4

== Episodes ==
While the show's first season is listed consistently as such, episode listings of its subsequent seasons vary. For season two, We TV separates the season into two parts in their official listings, but also includes the two seasons of the spin-off Love After Lockup: Life After Lockup in their episode count. iTunes splits the season into four volumes, while Amazon Prime list them separately as "2", "202", "203" and "204" respectively. The second part of season two has also been referred to as "season 3" by some media outlets and non-American digital platforms.

=== Series overview ===
Season	Episodes		Originally released	
Season	Episodes		First released	Last released
1	7		January 12, 2018	February 23, 2018
2	51	14	December 7, 2018	March 8, 2019
2	51	9	June 14, 2019	August 9, 2019
2	51	16	August 16, 2019	November 22, 2019
2	51	12	January 3, 2020	March 20, 2020
3	68	8	July 17, 2020	September 4, 2020
3	68	4	September 11, 2020	October 2, 2020
3	68	6	October 9, 2020	November 13, 2020
3	68	16	November 20, 2020	March 12, 2021
3	68	10	June 18, 2021	August 20, 2021
3	68	16	August 27, 2021	December 17, 2021
3	68	8	January 7, 2022	February 25, 2022
4	58	10	March 4, 2022	May 6, 2022
4	58	12	July 29, 2022	October 14, 2022
4	58	8	October 21, 2022	December 9, 2022
4	58	10	December 16, 2022	February 17, 2023
4	58	10	February 24, 2023	April 28, 2023
4	58	8	July 21, 2023	September 8, 2023
5	58	12	September 15, 2023	November 24, 2023
5	58	10	December 1, 2023	February 2, 2024
5	58	8	April 19, 2024	June 7, 2024
5	58	10	July 26, 2024	September 27, 2024
5	58	10	October 4, 2024	December 6, 2024
5	58	8	December 13, 2024	January 31, 2025
6	20	10	March 21, 2025	May 23, 2025
6	20	10	August 1, 2025	October 3, 2025
7	TBA	8	January 16, 2026	March 6, 2026
7	TBA	10	May 29, 2026	July 31, 2026

=== Season 1 (2018) ===
No. overall	No. in season	Title	Original release date
1	1	"From Felon to Fiance"	January 12, 2018
2	2	"New Warden in Town"	January 19, 2018
3	3	"Meet the Parents"	January 26, 2018
4	4	"Broken Promises"	February 2, 2018
5	5	"Surprises and Sentences"	February 9, 2018
6	6	"Race to the Altar"	February 16, 2018
7	7	"Prison Cell to Wedding Bells"	February 23, 2018

=== Season 2 (2018–2020) ===
No. overall	No. in season	Title	Original release date
Love After Lockup; Part 1
8	1	"The Virgin & the Trick"	December 7, 2018
9	2	"The $12,000 Lie"	December 14, 2018
10	3	"I Want this to Be Real"	December 21, 2018
11	4	"Washing Off Prison"	December 28, 2018
12	5	"Secrets and Cellmates"	January 4, 2019
13	6	"Your Card Has Been Declined"	January 11, 2019
14	7	"Rings and Runaways"	January 18, 2019
15	8	"She Said Yes?"	January 25, 2019
16	9	"The $800k Hustle"	February 1, 2019
17	10	"Wife on the Run"	February 8, 2019
18	11	"She Has to Go"	February 15, 2019
19	12	"Visits & Violations"	February 22, 2019
20	13	"Sorry, Not Sorry"	March 1, 2019
21	14	"Prison Blues to Wedding Bells"	March 8, 2019
Life After Lockup; Part 2
22	15	"Prove Yourself"	June 14, 2019
23	16	"Truth & Lies"	June 21, 2019
24	17	"Risks & Regulations"	June 28, 2019
25	18	"Second Chances"	July 5, 2019
26	19	"Trials & Tribulations"	July 12, 2019
27	20	"Dope Spoons & Second Honeymoons"	July 19, 2019
28	21	"Close Calls"	July 26, 2019
29	22	"The Schemiest Scheme Ever"	August 2, 2019
30	23	"Broken Bonds"	August 9, 2019
Love After Lockup; Part 3
31	24	"Inmate or Soulmate?"	August 17, 2019
32	25	"Felon Fantasy"	August 23, 2019
33	26	"Love is a Sickness"	August 30, 2019
34	27	"Indecent Proposals"	September 6, 2019
35	28	"The Mother of All Surprises"	September 13, 2019
36	29	"Catch Me If You Con"	September 20, 2019
37	30	"Menace to Society"	September 27, 2019
38	31	"Dirty Laundry"	October 4, 2019
39	32	"Snitches Get Stitches"	October 11, 2019
40	33	"Love the Way You Lie"	October 18, 2019
41	34	"Dangerous Engagements"	October 25, 2019
42	35	"Love or Con?"	November 1, 2019
43	36	"Truth & Consequences"	November 8, 2019
44	37	"Blinded by Love"	November 15, 2019
45	38	"To Con a Convict"	November 22, 2019
46	39	"Wedding Crashers & Cheaters"	November 22, 2019
Life After Lockup; Part 4
47	40	"Skeletons in the Closet"	January 3, 2020
48	41	"Manipulate the Manipulator"	January 10, 2020
49	42	"Wake Up Calls"	January 17, 2020
50	43	"Between Roc & a Hard Place"	January 24, 2020
51	44	"Rules & Receipts"	January 31, 2020
52	45	"Bonded & Ghosted"	February 7, 2020
53	46	"Con-Fessions"	February 14, 2020
54	47	"Risky Business"	February 21, 2020
55	48	"Royal Flush"	February 28, 2020
56	49	"The Wife, the Girlfriend & the Side Chick"	March 6, 2020
57	50	"Who's Cheating on Who?"	March 13, 2020
58	51	"The Final Straw"	March 20, 2020

=== Season 3 (2020–2022) ===
No. overall	No. in season	Title	Original release date
Love After Lockup; Part 1
59	1	"Stairway to Heaven"	July 17, 2020
60	2	"Bad at Being Good"	July 24, 2020
61	3	"Date With Destinie"	July 31, 2020
62	4	"Liar Liar"	August 7, 2020
63	5	"Roses on the Bed"	August 14, 2020
64	6	"A Gamble in the Desert"	August 21, 2020
65	7	"Denied & Declined"	August 28, 2020
66	8	"Love Don't Cost a Ring"	September 4, 2020
Life After Lockup; Part 2
67	9	"Bat Out of Hell"	September 11, 2020
68	10	"Up in Smoke"	September 18, 2020
69	11	"Up in Old Flames"	September 25, 2020
70	12	"Three's a Crowd"	October 2, 2020
Love After Lockup; Part 3
71	13	"Put a Sweater on and Chill"	October 9, 2020
72	14	"Bubble Trouble"	October 16, 2020
73	15	"Cuffing Season"	October 23, 2020
74	16	"Highway to Hell"	October 30, 2020
75	17	"Two Body Bags"	November 6, 2020
76	18	"99 Problems and an Ex is One"	November 13, 2020
Life After Lockup; Part 4
77	19	"M.I.A. Fiancée"	November 20, 2020
78	20	"Lame Sex or Psycho?"	November 27, 2020
79	21	"Secret Lives & Prison Wives"	December 4, 2020
80	22	"Big Daddy's Back"	December 11, 2020
81	23	"Ex Con-Versations"	December 18, 2020
82	24	"Criminal Behavior"	January 1, 2021
83	25	"Downward Spirals"	January 8, 2021
84	26	"Truth Bombs"	January 15, 2021
85	27	"Payback is a Snitch"	January 22, 2021
86	28	"Inmates & Playdates"	January 29, 2021
87	29	"Good News, Bad News"	February 5, 2021
88	30	"Trick or Cheat?"	February 12, 2021
89	31	"It's Tow or Never"	February 19, 2021
90	32	"30 Day Fiancé"	February 26, 2021
91	33	"Dirty Little Secrets"	March 5, 2021
92	34	"Life, Death, or Prison"	March 12, 2021
Love After Lockup; Part 5
93	35	"Cheap Thrills & Big Dills"	June 18, 2021
94	36	"Sugar Daddy or Boyfriend?"	June 25, 2021
95	37	"Freak in the Sheets"	July 2, 2021
96	38	"Imaginary Boyfriend?"	July 9, 2021
97	39	"Third Time's The Charm?"	July 16, 2021
98	40	"The Halfway Handoff"	July 23, 2021
99	41	"Sex Dolls & Booty Calls"	July 30, 2021
100	42	"Walk of Shame"	August 6, 2021
101	43	"Can't Buy me Love"	August 13, 2021
102	44	"Secret Cell-Mates"	August 20, 2021
Life After Lockup; Part 6
103	45	"Is He a Trick?"	August 27, 2021
104	46	"Love At Second Inmate?"	September 3, 2021
105	47	"Conned Again?"	September 10, 2021
106	48	"Players Get Played"	September 17, 2021
107	49	"Devil on the Shoulder"	September 24, 2021
108	50	"The Sober Truth"	October 1, 2021
109	51	"Not One to Mess With"	October 8, 2021
110	52	"Demons & Lies"	October 15, 2021
111	53	"Poly Problems"	October 22, 2021
112	54	"Put a Ring On It"	October 29, 2021
113	55	"Confessions of a Serial Liar"	November 5, 2021
114	56	"I'm Not in Love"	November 12, 2021
115	57	"I Plead the Fifth"	November 19, 2021
116	58	"Bride or Fugitive?"	December 3, 2021
117	59	"Bitter Baby Mamas & Bae-cations"	December 10, 2021
118	60	"Prison Promises"	December 17, 2021
Love During Lockup; Part 7
119	61	"Big, Buff and Incarcerated"	January 7, 2022
120	62	"The Secret Stash"	January 14, 2022
121	63	"Catch and Release?"	January 21, 2022
122	64	"Buy Buy Love"	January 28, 2022
123	65	"Lost in Love"	February 4, 2022
124	66	"Bye Felicia"	February 11, 2022
125	67	"He Loves Me, He Loves Me Not"	February 18, 2022
126	68	"The Boy is Mine"	February 25, 2022

=== Season 4 (2022–2023) ===
No. overall	No. in season	Title	Original release date
Love After Lockup; Part 1
127	1	"Happily Ever After?"	March 4, 2022
128	2	"P.O. Problems"	March 11, 2022
129	3	"Don't Track Me"	March 18, 2022
130	4	"Rule Breakers & Love Makers"	March 25, 2022
131	5	"Get Right or Get Left"	April 1, 2022
132	6	"Ex-tra Stress"	April 8, 2022
133	7	"What Are You Hiding?"	April 15, 2022
134	8	"Deny, Deny, Deny"	April 22, 2022
135	9	"What's Love Gotta Do With It?"	April 29, 2022
136	10	"The Home Wrecker & The Nervous Wreck"	May 6, 2022
Life After Lockup; Part 2
137	11	"Can't Stop Destiny"	July 29, 2022
138	12	"Bond Girl"	August 5, 2022
139	13	"Partners in Crime"	August 12, 2022
140	14	"Most Wanted"	August 19, 2022
141	15	"The Rebound & The Monster"	August 26, 2022
142	16	"Lost and Found"	September 2, 2022
143	17	"Dirty Little Secrets"	September 9, 2022
144	18	"Just a Snitch"	September 16, 2022
145	19	"Always the Bad Guy"	September 23, 2022
146	20	"I've Got Warrants, Bruh"	September 30, 2022
147	21	"You Got Served"	October 7, 2022
148	22	"Red Flags"	October 14, 2022
Love During Lockup; Part 3
149	23	"Scam the Scammer"	October 21, 2022
150	24	"Secret Prison Wedding"	October 28, 2022
151	25	"Til Death Do Us Part"	November 4, 2022
152	26	"Where There's Smoke..."	November 11, 2022
153	27	"My Fiance got a Fiancee"	November 18, 2022
154	28	"Jail Bait & Switch"	November 25, 2022
155	29	"Ride or Die?"	December 2, 2022
156	30	"Love Obsessed"	December 9, 2022
Love After Lockup; Part 4
157	31	"The Jeweler and the Thief"	December 16, 2022
158	32	"Married at Release"	December 23, 2022
159	33	"Sex, Lies, & Prison Wives"	December 30, 2022
160	34	"Ditched & Dismissed"	January 6, 2023
161	35	"Felons 4 Life"	January 13, 2023
162	36	"Car Chase from Hell"	January 20, 2023
163	37	"Red Flag After Red Flag"	January 27, 2023
164	38	"Ticking Time Bombs"	February 3, 2023
165	39	"Drunk in Love"	February 10, 2023
166	40	"Wedding Rings & Secret Flings"	February 17, 2023
Life After Lockup; Part 5
167	41	"Habitual Offenders"	February 24, 2023
168	42	"Fresh Out Glow"	March 3, 2023
169	43	"Family Lies"	March 10, 2023
170	44	"No Money, More Problems"	March 17, 2023
171	45	"Blindsided & Divided"	March 24, 2023
172	46	"The Ring is Off?"	March 31, 2023
173	47	"Roses & Thorns"	April 7, 2023
174	48	"Love Isn't Enough"	April 14, 2023
175	49	"Busted & Disgusted"	April 21, 2023
176	50	"I Do & I Don't"	April 28, 2023
Love During Lockup; Part 6
177	51	"Jail Talk"	July 21, 2023
178	52	"The Million Dollar Fantasy"	July 28, 2023
179	53	"Once a Criminal"	August 4, 2023
180	54	"You're The Inmate!"	August 11, 2023
181	55	"Spies & Lies"	August 18, 2023
182	56	"Got You a User?"	August 25, 2023
183	57	"Bonded For Life?"	September 1, 2023
184	58	"Are You His Auntie?"	September 8, 2023

=== Season 5 (2023–2024) ===
No. overall	No. in season	Title	Original release date
Love After Lockup; Part 1
185	1	"Born That Way"	September 15, 2023
186	2	"Street Lies and P.I.'s"	September 22, 2023
187	3	"The 40k Felon"	September 29, 2023
188	4	"Dark Side Of The Spoon"	October 6, 2023
189	5	"Rome's Not Where The Heart Is"	October 13, 2023
190	6	"Unhappy Father's Day"	October 20, 2023
191	7	"Seeing Redd"	October 27, 2023
192	8	"Here Comes the Lie"	November 3, 2023
193	9	"Escaping with Joy"	November 10, 2023
194	10	"Running from Love"	November 17, 2023
195	11	"The Reckoning"	November 24, 2023
196	12	"Onion of Lies"	November 24, 2023
Life After Lockup; Part 2
197	13	"Love Is a Powerful Drug"	December 1, 2023
198	14	"Tick Tok"	December 8, 2023
199	15	"Smells Like Bad Decisions"	December 15, 2023
200	16	"Pizza of My Heart"	December 22, 2023
201	17	"Problems You Didn't Know You Had"	December 29, 2023
202	18	"Deleted but Not Forgotten"	January 5, 2024
203	19	"Moms Behaving Badly"	January 12, 2024
204	20	"Shimmer Down"	January 19, 2024
205	21	"Games of Chance"	January 26, 2024
206	22	"Fighting Chance"	February 2, 2024
Love During Lockup; Part 3
207	23	"The Watcher and the Dancer"	April 19, 2024
208	24	"Vegas or Bust"	April 26, 2024
209	25	"Cut the Cameras!"	May 3, 2024
210	26	"Daughter-in-law or Mistress?"	May 10, 2024
211	27	"Free Candice!"	May 17, 2024
212	28	"The Mourning After"	May 24, 2024
213	29	"Rescue Me from the Castle!"	May 31, 2024
214	30	"Too Good To Let Go"	June 7, 2024
Love After Lockup; Part 4
215	31	"Do I Smell Like Jail?"	July 26, 2024
216	32	"Runaway Fiancé"	August 2, 2024
217	33	"First Times & Second Chances"	August 9, 2024
218	34	"How Mentally Stable Are You?"	August 16, 2024
219	35	"True or False?"	August 23, 2024
220	36	"Ready or Not"	August 30, 2024
221	37	"Love Me, Love Me Not"	September 6, 2024
222	38	"Hide & Seek"	September 13, 2024
223	39	"Rules of Engagement"	September 20, 2024
224	40	"Exes and Oh No's"	September 27, 2024
Life After Lockup; Part 5
225	41	"Welcome Home?"	October 4, 2024
226	42	"Save The Drama For Your Mama"	October 11, 2024
227	43	"Ring & Run!"	October 18, 2024
228	44	"Red Flags & White Dresses"	October 25, 2024
229	45	"Without Trust You Have Nothing"	November 1, 2024
230	46	"Love Bombs"	November 8, 2024
231	47	"The Sex Whisperer"	November 15, 2024
232	48	"Tests of Faith"	November 22, 2024
233	49	"High Risk Lies"	November 29, 2024
234	50	"Love Is Sacrifice"	December 6, 2024
Love During Lockup; Part 6
235	51	"Sugar Mama Drama"	December 13, 2024
236	52	"Indecent Proposal"	December 20, 2024
237	53	"Cruel Intentions"	December 27, 2024
238	54	"Ditch the Chicks"	January 3, 2025
239	55	"The Seven-Year Wait"	January 10, 2025
240	56	"Dickmatized"	January 17, 2025
241	57	"Hunter's Choice"	January 24, 2025
242	58	"Revenge Served Poolside"	January 21, 2025

=== Season 6 (2025) ===
No. overall	No. in season	Title	Original release date
Love After Lockup; Part 1
243	1	"Throuple Trouble"	March 21, 2025
244	2	"Free My Man"	March 28, 2025
245	3	"Fire & Gasoline"	April 4, 2025
246	4	"Reckless Entanglements"	April 11, 2025
247	5	"Gangsta Prince Charming"	April 18, 2025
248	6	"Quit Playing Games"	April 25, 2025
249	7	"Don't Hate the Player"	May 2, 2025
250	8	"Wife Or Warden?"	May 9, 2025
251	9	"Love & Vengeance"	May 16, 2025
252	10	"Old Flames & New Fires"	May 23, 2025
Life After Lockup; Part 2
253	11	"Read Between the Lies"	August 1, 2025
254	12	"Sugar-Daddy Drama"	August 8, 2025
255	13	"Positives and Negatives"	August 15, 2025
256	14	"Diamonds Aren't Forever"	August 22, 2025
257	15	"Caught in a Lie"	August 29, 2025
258	16	"We're in a Bad Situation"	September 5, 2025
259	17	"Playing With Fire"	September 12, 2025
260	18	"Karma's Coming"	September 19, 2025
261	19	"DNA All the Way"	September 26, 2025
262	20	"Vows and Vendettas"	October 3, 2025

=== Season 7 (2026) ===
No. overall	No. in season	Title	Original release date
Love During Lockup; Part 1
263	21	"All Aboard The Hot Mess Express"	January 16, 2026
264	22	"999 Years"	January 23, 2026
265	23	"Road Trips And Red Flags"	January 30, 2026
266	24	"The Ex-Factor"	February 6, 2026
267	25	"Charm or Con?"	February 13, 2026
268	26	"Love Does Cost a Thing"	February 20, 2026
269	27	"A Messy Conundrum"	February 27, 2026
270	28	"Hello & Goodbye"	March 6, 2026
Love After Lockup; Part 2
271	1	"Big Throuple Energy"	May 29, 2026
272	2	"The Ex-Files"	June 5, 2026
273	3	"My Ex's Cellmate"	June 12, 2026
274	4	"Double Release Trouble"	June 19, 2026
275	5	"Dating a Stranger"	June 26, 2026
276	6	"No Crash Dummy"	July 3, 2026
277	7	"Kick Rocks"	July 10, 2026
278	8	"Skating Around the Truth"	July 17, 2026
279	9	"The Math Ain't Mathin'"	July 24, 2026
280	10	"Toe Rings & Poly Flings"	July 31, 2026

== Specials ==
Featured season	Title	Original release date
Our Story
2	"Johanna & Garret"	October 19, 2018
2	"James & Alla"	October 26, 2018
2	"Mary & Dom"	November 2, 2018
2	"Andrea & Lamar"	November 9, 2018
2	"Scott & Lizzie, Angela & Tony"	November 16, 2018
Special Episodes
2	"Most Arresting Moments"	June 7, 2019
3	"How to Date an Inmate"	December 31, 2021
3	"True Confessions"	December 31, 2021
3	"True Confessions, Eyewitness Accounts"	December 31, 2021
Where Are They Now?
4	"Stan & Tai"	July 12, 2023
4	"Chazz & Glorietta"	July 19, 2023
4	"Shavel & Quaylon"	August 2, 2023
4	"Megan & Sarah"	August 9, 2023
4	"Britney & Ray, Caitlin"	August 23, 2023
4	"Lizzie & Jessica"	August 30, 2023
4	"Kevin & Indie"	September 6, 2023
4	"Johanna & Garret"	September 20, 2023
5	"Brittney and Santiba"	October 4, 2023
5	"Monique & Lizzy"	October 11, 2023
5	"John & Kristianna, Haley"	October 18, 2023
5	"Amber & Jessica"	October 26, 2023
5	"Cheryl & Kaylah"	November 2, 2023
5	"Andrea & Mark"	November 9, 2023
5	"Lisa, Lacey, & Antoine"	November 16, 2023
5	"Best Of"	November 29, 2023
5	"Repeat Offenders"	December 21, 2023
5	"Cheaters (Part 1)"	December 14, 2023
5	"Cheaters (Part 2)"	December 21, 2023
5	"Con-Versations"	December 27, 2023
Crime Story
5	"Lindsay & Garrett"	February 7, 2025
5	"Brittany & Quaylon"	February 14, 2025
5	"Lizzie & Louie"	February 21, 2025
5	"Lisa & Mikey"	February 28, 2025
5	"Destinie & Michael"	March 7, 2025
5	"Amber & Cameron"	March 14, 2025
