= South Thames Colleges Group =

Further education school in London, England

Location
- Kingston Hall Road; London, KT1 2AQ; United Kingdom

Information
- Type: Further education
- Established: 2017
- Local authority: Wandsworth, Merton, Sutton, Kingston upon Thames
- Department for Education URN: 130420 Tables
- Ofsted: Reports
- Principal: Peter Mayhew-Smith
- Website: stcg.ac.uk

South Thames Colleges Group (STCG) is a large further education institution that operates four colleges in south-west London: South Thames College, Kingston College, Merton College, and Carshalton College. The four main campuses are in Wandsworth, Kingston upon Thames, Morden, and Carshalton.

== History ==
South Thames Colleges Group was formed in 2017 by the merger of South Thames College and Merton College with Kingston College and Carshalton College.

=== South Thames College ===
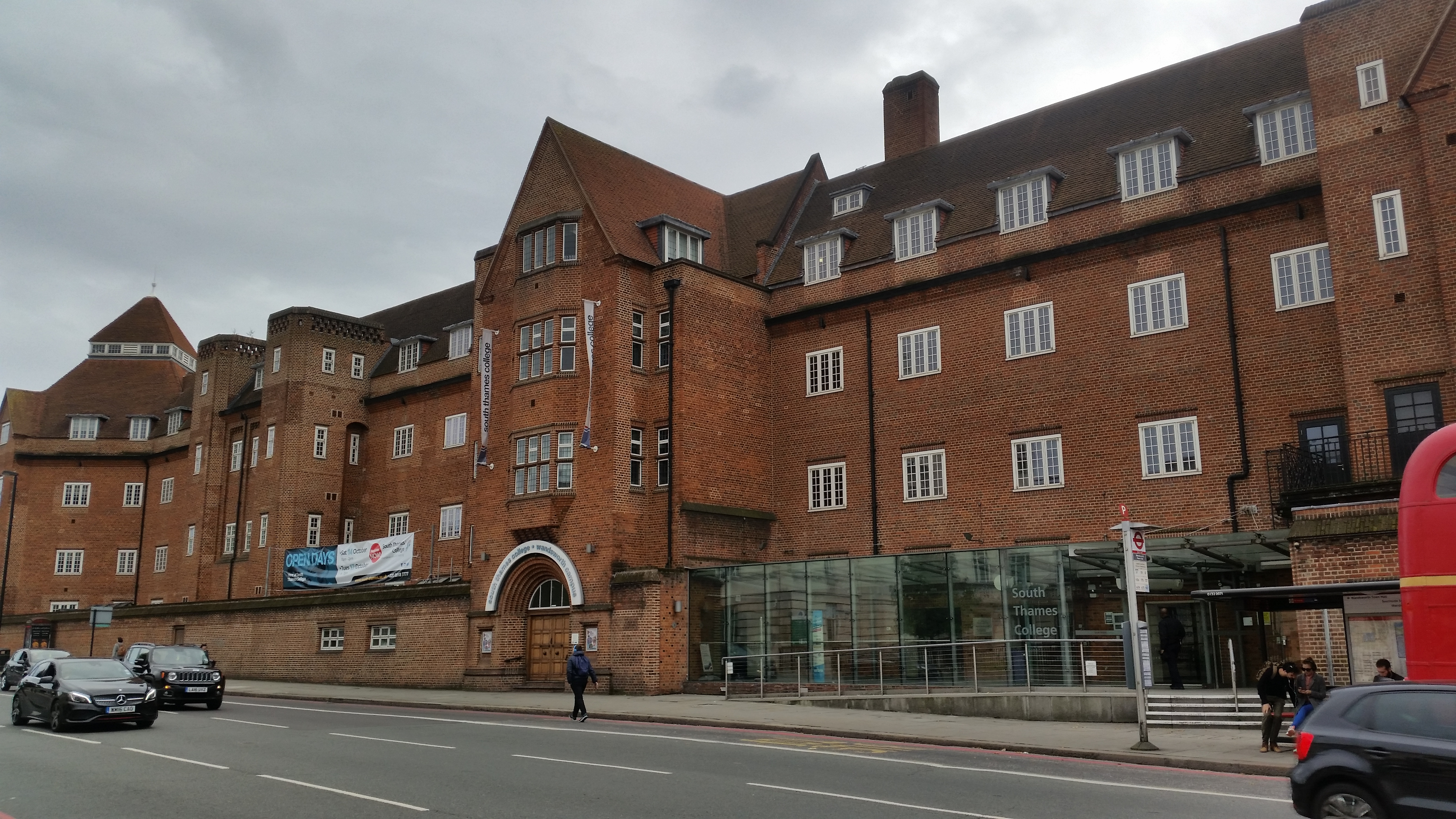
College building in Wandsworth

South Thames College was founded in 1895.

South Thames College is the largest provider of post-16 study and training in the London Borough of Wandsworth

=== Carshalton College ===
Carshalton College opened as Carshalton Technical Institute in 1954. In 2012, it entered into a federation with Kingston College.

=== Merton College ===
Merton College has existed since around 1890. A new building was erected in 1971 with additional blocks in later years. It formerly occupied a site on Central Road in the borough, which was sold to Barratt Homes, a housing developer. Merton College merged with South Thames College in 2009.

It should not be confused with Merton Sixth Form College, a nearby separate institution that was formed in 1990 and later became Phoenix Sixth Form College before closing down.

=== Kingston College ===
The forerunner of this college was Kingston Technical College founded in 1899. It was divided in 1962, with the technical college part first becoming Kingston Polytechnic and later becoming Kingston University, while the remainder became Kingston College of Further Education, later re-named Kingston College. The main campus is in Kingston Hall Road, with a second site in a former school building in Richmond Road, Kingston.

== Notable alumni ==
=== Carshalton ===
- James Ash, musician
- Paul Burstow, politician
- Qubad Talabani, diplomat
- Plastician, musician
- Jacqueline Wilson, author
- BM, musician

=== Kingston ===
- Edward Woodward (1930-2009), actor

=== South Thames ===
- John Boyega attended South Thames, graduating in 2011.
