= Sharp Entertainment =

American television production company

Sharp Entertainment, LLC
- Type: Subsidiary
- Industry: Reality television
- Founded: 2003; 23 years ago
- Founder: Matt Sharp
- Headquarters: Manhattan, New York City, U.S.
- Key people: Matt Sharp (CEO); Bob Larson (president)
- Parent: Sony Pictures (2012–present)
- Website: sharpentertainment.com

Sharp Entertainment, LLC is a television production company based in Manhattan, New York. Founded by Matt Sharp in 2003, they have produced thousands of hours of programming in reality television. They produce TLC's top rated television franchise, 90 Day Fiancé, which consists of 6 spin off series. The February 23, 2020 premiere of 90 Day Fiancé: Before the 90 Days had 3.3 million viewers, putting TLC in the #2 spot for the night. Some of their other hits include Love After Lockup (We TV), Man v. Food (Cooking Channel), Marrying Millions (Lifetime), Doomsday Preppers (National Geographic), Extreme Couponing (TLC), and The Fabulous Life (VH1).

Sharp Entertainment was acquired by CORE Media Group in 2012, which was relaunched as Industrial Media in 2018. On March 2, 2022, the company became part of Sony Pictures Television after its acquisition of Industrial Media and subsequent rebranding as Sony Pictures Television Nonfiction in November.

== Legal and other issues ==
In 2014, Mother Jones revealed that Animal Planet’s hit Call of the Wildman repeatedly staged wildlife encounters, imported coyotes without permits and concealed animal neglect to manufacture drama on camera. The exposé triggered formal investigations by Kentucky wildlife officials, the USDA, PETA, and the Humane Society—ultimately resulting in a fine for the production team.

In 2018, New York’s Attorney General reached a $226,000 settlement with Sharp Entertainment after a state investigation found the company had failed to pay overtime to production assistants and associate producers working on its shows. The investigation revealed that these crew members regularly worked over 40 hours per week without receiving the legally required overtime premiums, prompting the agreement to compensate affected employees and bring Sharp into compliance with state labor laws.

== List of productions ==
=== Television shows ===
- 100 Greatest Red Carpet Moments (2004)
- 30 Even Scarier Movie Moments (2006)
- Videos That Rocked the World (2007–2008)
- Confessions of a Matchmaker (2007)
- NOFX: Backstage Passport (2008)
- Ask Aida (2008–2009)
- Man v. Food (2008–2022)
- Underdog to Wonderdog (2009–2010)
- The Lottery Changed My Life (2009–2011)
- Most Terrifying Places in America (2009–2018)
- Punkin Chunkin (2010)
- Extreme Couponing (2010–2012)
- Bert the Conqueror (2010–2016)
- Flying Anvils (2011)
- Celebrity Nightmares Decoded (2011)
- Man v. Food Nation (2011–2012)
- Rattlesnake Republic (2011–2014)
- Call of the Wildman (2011–2014)
- My Crazy Obsession (2012–2013)
- Doomsday Preppers (2012–2014)
- Adam Richman's Best Sandwich in America (2012)
- Fast Food Mania (2012)
- Property Wars (2012–2013)
- Toy Hunter (2012–2014)
- Extreme Cheapskates (2012–2014)
- Dates from Hell (2012–2014)
- Fish Tank Kings (2012)
- Head Games (2012)
- Bad Ink (2013–2014)
- Dig Wars (2013)
- 90 Day Fiancé (2014–present)
- Secret Lives of Stepford Wives (2014)
- Outrageous (2014)
- Frankenfood (2014)
- Sold on the Spot (2014)
- 101 More Amazing Places to Chowdown (2014)
- Tethered (2014)
- Momsters: When Moms Go Bad (2014–2015)
- 101 Amazing Thrills (2015)
- Hack My Life (2015–2018)
- 90 Day Fiancé: Happily Ever After? (2016–present)
- 90 Day Fiancé: Before the 90 Days (2017–present)
- 90 Day Fiancé: What Now? (2017–present)
- Love After Lockup (2018–present)
- Best Places to Pig Out (2018–present)
- 90 Day Fiancé: Pillow Talk (2019–present)
- 90 Day Fiancé: The Family Chantel (2019–present)
- 90 Day Fiancé: The Other Way (2019–present)
- 90 Day Fiancé: Just Landed (2019)
- Marrying Millions (2019–present)
- Ghosted: Love Gone Missing (2019–2021)
- 90 Day Fiancé: Self-Quarantined (2020–present)
- Darcey & Stacey (2020–2023)
- 90 Day Fiancé: B90 Strikes Back! (2020–present)
- 90 Day Fiancé: HEA Strikes Back! (2020–present)
- 90 Day Bares All (2021–present)
- 90 Day Diaries (2021–present)
- 90 Day: The Single Life (2021–present)
- 90 Day Fiancé: TOW Strikes Back! (2021–present)
- 90 Day Fiance: The Other Way Strikes Back! (2021–present)
- 90 Day Bares All (2021–present)
- 90 Day Fiancé: Love Games (2021–present)
- 90 Day: Foody Call (2021)
- 90 Day Lovers' Collection (2021)
- Love in Paradise: The Caribbean, A 90 Day Story (2021–present)
- Loren & Alexei: After the 90 Days (2022–present)
- David & Annie: After the 90 Days (2022–present)
- Love Off the Grid (2022–present)
- Dancing Queens (2023–present)
- Match Me Abroad (2023–present)
- 90 Day: The Last Resort (2023–present)
- Love & Translation (2024–present)
- Forbidden Love (2024–present)
- The Wranglers (2024)
- 90 Day: The Last Resort Between the Sheets (2024–present)
- Pop the Balloon Live (2025)
- 90 Day: Hunt for Love (2025–present)

=== Films and specials ===
- Great Things About the Holidays (2005)
- Halloween's Most Extreme (2007)
- The iPod Revolution (2007)
- 25 Biggest Real Estate Mistakes (2008)
- Extreme Mind-Blowing Hotels (2008)
- Extreme Ways to Go Green (2008)
- Buying and Selling: 20 Best Kept Secrets (2009)
- The Tragic Side of Comedy (2009)
- 13 Scarier Movie Moments (2009)
- Fame and Recovery (2010)
- Extreme Couponing (2010)
- The Tragic Side of Fame (2011)
- Large, Dangerous, Rocket Ships (2011)
- Halloween Crazy (2011)
- Christmas Crazy (2011)
- Extreme Couponing Black Friday Blitz (2012)
- Extreme Couponing: Midnight Madness (2012)
- Extreme Couponing: Holiday Hauls (2012)
- Hollywood's Most Notorious Crimes (2012)
- Halloween Crazier (2012)
- Lost Magic Decoded (2012) (co-production with Peter Greenberg Worldwide)
- Christmas Crazier (2012)
- Instant Christmas (2012)
- JonBenet's Mother: Victim or Killer (2016)
- Germophobia (2021)
