= Nancy Weatherly Sharp =

American academic and author

- Born: October 24, 1936; Illinois
- Died: February 12, 2023 (aged 86); Syracuse
- Citizenship: United States
- Occupations: Journalism, academic and author
- Spouse: James Roger Sharp

Academic background
- Education: University of Missouri

Nancy Weatherly Sharp was an American academic and author. She was an associate dean for graduate and professional studies as well as a professor of newspaper journalism at Syracuse University.

Sharp is most known for her work in the fields of communication and journalism. Among her authored works are her publications in academic journals, including American Behavioral Scientist as well as books such as Faculty Women in Journalism and Mass Communications: Problems and Progress and Communications Research: The Challenge of the Information Age. Additionally, she held the distinction of being Syracuse University's inaugural female mace bearer.

== Early life and education ==
Sharp was born in Illinois and raised in Missouri. She studied journalism at the University of Missouri where she graduated first in her class.

== Career ==
Sharp began her career as a writer and journalist. From 1958 to the early 1970s she was a reporter for the Columbia Missourian, researcher and writer for the Missouri Historical Review, and was a feature writer and reporter for the Hayward Review (California), the Oakland Review (California), and the Syracuse Herald Journal. In 1965, while serving as the Washington correspondent for the Oakland (CA) Tribune, she wrote stories about Secretary of State, Dean Rusk and Secretary of Defense, Robert McNamara. In the early 1970s, she joined the faculty of the Newhouse School as a professor of newspaper journalism, as one of its initial female hires. She later assumed the role of the school's inaugural assistant dean for graduate and professional studies. From 2004 to 2017, she held the position of Syracuse University's mace bearer.

== Works ==
Sharp has contributed to various books throughout her career. In 1985, she authored the book Faculty Women in Journalism and Mass Communications: Problems and Progress, wherein she discussed the challenges and advancements faced by women faculty members in journalism and mass communication programs. Her 1988 book Communications Research: The Challenge of the Information Age is an introductory guide to communications research. Furthermore, she co-edited four volumes of American Legislative Leaders with her husband, James Roger Sharp. These volumes are titled American Legislative Leaders in the West, 1911–1994 (1997), American Legislative Leaders in the Mid-West, 1911–1994 (1997), American Legislative Leaders in the South, 1911–1994 (1999), and American Legislative Leaders in the Northeast, 1911–1994 (2000). The volumes serve as a resource for people interested in understanding the political history and dynamics of state government in the United States through the lens of state speakerships.

Sharp also made contributions to academia through academic papers and book reviews, in addition to her books. In 1991, she co-authored a paper with J Deppa. The paper examined the effects of media attention on individuals involved in the Pan Am 103 tragedy, suggesting that while inappropriate media behavior can be harmful, sensitive coverage may provide support and advocacy for the bereaved.

== Death ==
Sharp died at her residence in Manlius, New York on February 12, 2023.

== Awards and honors ==
- 2004–2017 – First Female Mace Bearer, Syracuse University

== Bibliography ==
=== Books ===
- Communications Research: The Challenge of the Information Age (1998) ISBN 9780815624332
- American Legislative Leaders in the West, 1911–1994 (1997) ISBN 9780313302121
- American Legislative Leaders in the Mid-West 1911–1994 (1997) ISBN 9780313302145
- American Legislative Leaders in the South 1911–1994 (1999) ISBN 9780313302138
- American Legislative Leaders in the Northeast, 1911–1994 (2000) ISBN 9780313302152

=== Selected articles ===
- Deppa, J., & Sharp, N. W. (1991). Under international scrutiny: Reaction of media targets. American Behavioral Scientist, 35(2), 150–165.
