= La Prospérité =

Congolese daily newspaper

- Editor: Marcel Ngoyi Ngoyi Kyengi (publisher and director general)
- Categories: General interest; news; politics
- Frequency: Daily
- Founder: Marcel Ngoyi Ngoyi Kyengi
- Founded: December 2000; 25 years ago
- First issue: 7 February 2001; 25 years ago
- Country: Democratic Republic of the Congo
- Based in: Ngaliema, Kinshasa
- Language: French
- Website: laprosperite.cd

La Prospérité is a French-language Congolese daily newspaper published in Kinshasa, Democratic Republic of the Congo. Its full title is La Prospérité, Quotidien d'Actions pour la Démocratie et le Développement, meaning "La Prospérité, Daily Newspaper for Action for Democracy and Development". The newspaper was founded by journalist Marcel Ngoyi Ngoyi Kyengi in 2000 and published its first issue on 7 February 2001. The newspaper covers political, economic, social and cultural affairs in the DRC and is headquartered in Ngaliema, Kinshasa.

== History ==
Marcel Ngoyi Ngoyi Kyengi, a journalist who had previously worked for the Congolese newspaper L'Avenir, founded La Prospérité in December 2000. His departure from L'Avenir came amid a period of pressure on the newspaper and its staff. In October 2000, L'Avenir was forced to suspend publication for more than a week after security forces raided its offices and damaged vital computer equipment. On 22 December, according to the Kinshasa-based press-freedom organization Journaliste en Danger (JED), three Congolese army soldiers set fire to Ngoyi Kyengi's residence while he was away. His children were reportedly locked in a room before the fire was set, although his eldest son escaped and alerted neighbors. JED reported that the soldiers left a threatening message warning Ngoyi Kyengi to "mind your own business" and threatening his family.

La Prospérité was established shortly afterward. According to media scholar and author Jean-Claude Muhindo Matabaro, Ngoyi Kyengi sought to establish a publication independent of existing political tendencies and open to different viewpoints, with a focus on democracy and development. The newspaper's first issue appeared on 7 February 2001. In 2002, it received its publication declaration receipt, registered under number 04/CAB.MCP/007/2002. The paper subsequently adopted the descriptor Quotidien d'Actions pour la Démocratie et le Développement.

=== Development ===
At the time of its establishment, La Prospérité did not have a computer. Articles were typed and processed using office equipment, after which the director took the selected articles to a printing house for printing and distribution. When it began publication in 2001, the newspaper appeared weekly. According to Muhindo's research on its development, it became a biweekly publication after approximately one year, appearing on Mondays and Fridays, then expanded to three issues per week, published on Mondays, Wednesdays and Fridays, before eventually becoming a daily newspaper.

During its early years, the newspaper had no permanent salaried staff and relied on temporary journalists and freelance contributors. Ngoyi Kyengi purchased its first computer after four years of operation. By its fifth year, the newspaper had four computers, used for typing, proofreading, layout and the owner's work. A 2008 anniversary report, marking its eighth year of publication, stated that the newspaper employed approximately 42 people, including journalists, support personnel and permanent provincial correspondents. By around 2010, the newspaper had acquired additional machinery and equipment, established a presence in several provinces, including Bas-Congo (now Kongo Central), Bandundu, North Kivu and Maniema, and, according to Muhindo's account that year, was distributed in Kinshasa and elsewhere through street vendors, public places and subscriptions.

== Ownership and management ==
Ngoyi Kyengi is the founder, owner and publisher-director general of La Prospérité. In 2002, he was identified as its éditeur-directeur général. At the time, Weyi Ndolumingu headed the administrative secretariat, while G. B. Akumbakwa was editorial director. Alfred Mwari Tulengi was the principal editor-in-chief, with Ghislain Lubula serving as editor-in-chief. The editorial secretaries were Badi Badi, Peter Tshibangu and Eugène Khonde. A 2024 edition of the newspaper likewise lists G. B. Akumbakwa as editorial director and Ngoyi Kyengi as publisher and director general. The newspaper has a central editorial team, specialized sports and music sections, and provincial representatives in Bandundu, Kongo Central, Haut-Katanga, and other locations.

The newspaper was previously headquartered at No. 5448, behind the Le Royal building in Gombe, Kinshasa. According to Muhindo's 2010 account, it was then headquartered at 33 Avenue de la Paix, Mont Fleuri, in Ngaliema. The newspaper was based in a building owned by Ngoyi Kyengi, which also housed his family residence and areas used for the newspaper's operations.
