= James Roger Sharp =

Political historian

- Occupations: Political historian, academic and author
- Spouse: Nancy Weatherly Sharp

Academic background
- Education: AB., Political Science; MA., American History; PhD., American History
- Alma mater: University of Missouri; University of California at Berkeley

James Roger Sharp is a political historian, academic and author. He is a professor emeritus of History at Maxwell School of Syracuse University.

Sharp is most known for his work on American political history, particularly the early national and middle period (1789–1860). He has authored and co-authored research articles and books such as The Deadlocked Election of 1800: Jefferson, Burr, and the Union in the Balance, American Politics in the Early Republic: The New Nation in Crisis, The Jacksonians versus the banks: Politics in the States after the panic of 1837 and 4 volumes of American Leaders (South, Northeast, Midwest, and West). He is a recipient of the 1971 National Endowment for the Humanities Fellowship, the 1979–1980 American Council of Learned Societies Fellowship, 1995 Chancellor's Citation for Exceptional Academic Achievement and was named the Scholar-Teacher of the Year by Syracuse University in 1996.

== Education ==
Sharp obtained an AB in Political Science in 1958 and an MA in American History in 1960, both from the University of Missouri. Subsequently, he received a PhD in American History from the University of California at Berkeley in 1966.

== Career ==
Sharp began his academic career in 1966 as an assistant professor at Syracuse University, where he was later appointed associate professor in 1970 and has been serving as Professor of History since 1979.

From 1967 to 1968, Sharp was the Associate Chairperson of the Department of History, and subsequently became a member of the University Senate from 1982 to 2000. He worked as Chair of the Department of History in four terms: initially from 1976 to 1983, then as Acting Chair from 1986 to 1987, and later as chair from 1990 to 1995 and from 2001 to 2003.

In 1977, he was a Conferee on the Annual Chief Justice Earl Warren Conference on Advocacy in the United States, and subsequently served as a Consultant to SUNY to evaluate history department and program at SUNY Potsdam in 1980. In addition, he was a member of professional societies like the Society for Historians of the Early American Republic, where he became the national program chairman for the conference in 1981, while also being on the Advisory Council from 1981 to 1985. Concurrently, he served on the Board of Editors for the Journal of the Early Republic and later became a Consultant to the Courage Foundation from 1986 to 1992.

== Research ==
Sharp has contributed to the field of political history by studying American political history, major events, legislative leadership and decision making, along with the general situation in the period between 1789 and 1860.

Sharp has authored, co-authored and edited several books on the early American Republic and the main political occurrences of that time. He discussed Jacksonian democracy and surrounding controversy in The Jacksonians versus the banks: Politics in the States after the panic of 1837, about which W.R. Brock stated, "This book shows that the study of politics in the states opens a new field for inquiry and may force the abandonment or revision of several familiar theses."

In his 1993 book American Politics in the Early Republic: The New Nation in Crisis, Sharp presented an analysis of the challenges faced by the new nation between the years 1789 to 1801 in establishing a stable union amid political polarization, sectional allegiances, and foreign policy complexities. John H. Flannagan wrote, "a very informative, thought provoking, and scholarly assessment of the so-called Federalist Era.... [that] may well replace the pioneering work of John C. Miller as the new standard text or required reading in college and graduate school classes."

Sharp, along with his wife, Nancy W. Sharp, edited four volumes assessing the state house speakers from 1911 to 1994, offering biographical and career details on over 1,400 speakers, entitled American Legislative Leaders in the Mid-West, 1911–1994, American Legislative Leaders in the Northeast, American Legislative Leaders in the South and American Legislative Leaders in the West.

Furthermore, Sharp authored The Deadlocked Election of 1800: Jefferson, Burr, and the Union in the Balance, where he wrote on the historical context by reevaluating the 1800 election, dispelling misconceptions about states' rights, international conflicts, and political polarization in the era, and stated that the French Revolution significantly influenced early Americans' perceptions, serving as a mirror to assess their own nation's historical progress and potential challenges. In his review for the Journal of the Early Republic, Andrew W. Robertson remarked, "Sharp explains in vivid detail the dramatic oscillations in public support between the Federalists and Republicans in the late 1790s. Here the author shows himself to be the master of the telling details of both state and national politics."

== Awards and honors ==
- 1971 – Fellowship, National Endowment for the Humanities
- 1979–1980 – Fellowship, American Council of learned Societies
- 1995 – Chancellor's Citation for Exceptional Academic Achievement, Syracuse University
- 1996 – Scholar-Teacher of the Year, Syracuse University

== Bibliography ==
=== Selected books ===
- The Jacksonians versus the banks: Politics in the States after the panic of 1837 (1970) ISBN 978-0231032605
- American Politics in the Early Republic: The New Nation in Crisis (1993) ISBN 978-0300065190
- Editor, American Legislative Leaders in the West, 1911–1994 (1997) ISBN 978-0313302121
- Editor, American Legislative Leaders in the Mid-West, 1911–1994 (1997) ISBN 978-0313302121
- Editor, American Legislative Leaders in the South, 1911–1994 (1999) ISBN 978-0313302138
- Editor, American Legislative Leaders in the Northeast, 1911–1994 (2000) ISBN 978-0313302152
- The Deadlocked Election of 1800: Jefferson, Burr, and the Union in the Balance (2010) ISBN 978-0700617425

=== Selected articles ===
- Sharp, J. R. (1984). The Political Culture of Middle-Period United States. Canadian Review of American Studies, 15(1), 49–62.
- Sharp, J. R. (1996). Jefferson and Madison: Three Conversations from the Founding. The Journal of American History, 82(4), 1566.
- Sharp, J. R. (1999). The Papers of George Washington: Presidential Series: Volume 7: December 1790–March 1791.
- Sharp, J. R. (2011). From Deference to Democracy: The Transformation of American Society, 1789–1815. Reviews in American History, 39(1), 54–60.
- Sharp, J. R. (2023). The Papers of George Washington, Presidential Series. Volume 19: 1 October 1795 – 31 March 1796 ed. by David R. Hoth, and: The Papers of George Washington, Presidential Series. Volume 20: 1 April–21 September 1796 ed. by David R. Hoth and William M. Ferraro, and: The Papers of George Washington, Presidential Series. Volume 21: 22 September 1796 – 3 March 1797 ed. by Adrina Garbooshian-Huggins. Journal of Southern History, 89(3), 553–555.
