= The Fabulous Life of... =

- Genre: Documentary
- Written by: Rebecca Eisen; Piper Weiss
- Narrated by: Christopher Flockton
- Country of origin: United States
- Original language: English
- No. of episodes: 209

Production
- Production company: Sharp Entertainment

Original release
- Network: VH1
- Release: May 1, 2003 – June 19, 2013

The Fabulous Life of... is a VH1 television series detailing the places, things, and services various celebrities enjoy. It first aired in 2003, with a special about Jennifer Lopez. The show is similar in format to Lifestyles of the Rich and Famous, albeit being narrated with mostly stills and file video, and without the cooperation of the profiled subjects.

The show is narrated by Christopher Flockton.

== Really Rich Real Estate ==
The Fabulous Life Presents: Really Rich Real Estate is a spin-off focusing on the Westside Estate Agency and their wealthy celebrity clients. Frankie Muniz and Inge Bongo were featured in the first episode which premiered in November 2006. Unlike The Fabulous Life of..., which focuses on the celebrities themselves, this series focuses on a business which caters to celebrities and has a different tone and style. The houses are featured because someone wants to buy or sell them with Westside.
