= Sista Becky =

Congolese rapper (born 1990s)

- Sista Becky in a 2021 promotion of Apértif
- Born: Rebecca Kalonji; 1990s Kinshasa, Zaire
- Other name: Princess Bantou

Rebecca Kalonji (born 1990s), known professionally as Sista Becky and Princess Bantou, is a Congolese lyricist, songwriter, rapper, and dancer. She has participated in raising awareness for HIV/AIDS and violence against women in the Democratic Republic of the Congo (DRC). In 2025, she partnered with the world Food Programme to fight child hunger and malnutrition in the DRC.

== Biography ==
Sista Becky was born as Rebecca Kalonji in the 1990s in Kinshasa, Zaire. At a young age, she was inspired especially from French rap.

In 2016, she made her professional debut with the release of her first single, "Mr le rap". She was nicknamed the "First Lady" of Congolese rap, an industry dominated by men. She performed at a concert on held at in Kinshasa on 3 June 2017, which was co-organized by the Congolese government, Cordaid, SANRU, and the World Bank Group to raise awareness for HIV/AIDS and violence against women. She also performed at a concert on in the commune of Bumbu on 2 December 2017 to raise awareness for HIV/AIDS. In 2018, she participated at the Red One festival in Kinshasa.

She continued to release singles, such as "Émotions" and "Notorius spirit" in 2018 and "Fallait la distance" in 2020. In 2021, she released "Il fait semblant" in collaboration with Innoss'B and released her first album, Apéritif. In 2025, she partnered with the World Food Programme to combat malnutrition and hunger amongst children in the Democratic Republic of the Congo.

== Awards and honors ==
- In 2016, she was awarded "Best Female Artist" at the Rap at Kin Awards.

== Discography ==
=== Albums ===
- Apéritif (2021)

=== Singles ===
- "Mr le rap" (2016)
- "Notorius Spirit" (2018)
- "Émotions" (2018)
- "Fallait la distance" (2020)
- "Il faitsemblant" (with Inoss'b; 2021)
- "Plus qu'un rêve" (2022)
- "Bang" (2023)
