= Marrying Millions =

2019 American reality television series

- Genre: Reality television
- Country of origin: United States
- Original language: English
- No. of seasons: 2
- No. of episodes: 30

Production
- Running time: 42 minutes
- Production company: Sharp Entertainment

Original release
- Network: Lifetime
- Release: July 10, 2019 – March 31, 2021

Marrying Millions is an American reality television series that premiered on Lifetime on July 10, 2019. The show follows the everyday lives of six couples, one of whom has achieved high levels of wealth, income or professional success while the other has a more modest background.

On October 2, 2019, the series was renewed for a second season which began on August 5, 2020. This season continued to follow one couple from Season 1 and introduced 5 new couples.

== Cast ==
Marrying Millions included the following couples:

=== Sean Lourdes and Megan Thomas Lourdes ===
Megan is a yoga instructor, a model signed with Elite, graduate of UCLA, and fiancée of Sean with whom she has a three-year-old son. Sean is the grandson of AUGE Media Publishing founder, Don Julio Lourdes. While most of their wedding planning goes smoothly, the couple face pressure from Sean's father, Emilio, to get a prenup. The season ends with the pair marrying at Cypress Sea Cove in Malibu, without a prenup.

=== Shawn Isaac and Kate London ===
Shawn, 29, is a rapper and entrepreneur from Palm Springs. While Kate, 33, has wedding bells on her mind, she begins to question if everything is what it seems. In their final episode, Shawn gives Katie a "diamond" bracelet that turns out to be Cubic Zirconia. The couple previously appeared on a Facebook reality show Make Up or Break up in 2017. Isaac has also been on MTV's True Life, Startup U, Bravo's Million Dollar Matchmaker (Season 2, Episode 6).

=== Gentille Chhun and Brian Blu (also known as Dave Smith) ===
Gentille is a real estate investor in Las Vegas who has been dating Brian, an actor and construction worker who her friends think is using her. During the season, the couple get engaged, but ultimately break-up on the day of their wedding. After the season aired, the legitimacy of their wedding day came into question on reports there was no registered marriage license under either of their names in Clark County, Nevada (which would have been required if they were in fact marrying that day).

=== Drew Gemma and Rosie Marin ===
40 year old Drew owns a construction and landscaping company and likes to spoil his college graduate girlfriend Rosie, whom he met on SugarDaddy.com. During the season, the couple got engaged. In the season finale, the couple elope to Costa Rica. It is unclear if they are legally married in the U.S. Rosie coined the phrase "Come Through Daddy Drew." After the show aired, Drew's financing allegedly came into question after tax liens and Uniform Commercial Code (UCC) filings became public.

=== Bill Hutchinson and Brianna Ramirez ===
Briana, a 21 year-old restaurant hostess, had been dating Bill, the 60-year-old president of Dallas-based real estate firm Dunhill Partners Inc, for one year. Bill's ex-wife is also on the show to "stir the pot." After two years, the couple are still together. In July 2021, Bill would be criminally charged with sexually abusing three underage girls at his vacation home in Laguna Beach, California.

=== Katie Hamilton and Kolton Pierce ===
Katie, 37, has been dating her daughter's friend Kolton, 23. Katie was previously married to baseball player Josh Hamilton. The current status of their relationship is unknown.

== Couples ==
Couple	Cast	Age	Occupation	Relationship status	Notes
1	Sean Lourdes	36	Chairman of The Lourdes Foundation and President of Auge Media	Married	The couple has a five-year-old son. While planning for their wedding, Sean's father Emilio pressures the couple to sign a prenup. Sean and Megan married at Cypress Sea Cove, a private estate in Malibu. They married without signing a prenup.
1	Megan Thomas Lourdes	25	Project Director for The Lourdes Foundation	Married	The couple has a five-year-old son. While planning for their wedding, Sean's father Emilio pressures the couple to sign a prenup. Sean and Megan married at Cypress Sea Cove, a private estate in Malibu. They married without signing a prenup.
2	Drew Gemma	39	Owner of landscaping company	Married	Couple met on SugarDaddy.com and elope to Costa Rica. On the show, Rosie coined the phrase "Come Through Daddy Drew." After the show aired, Drew's financing came into question after tax liens became public.
2	Rosie Marin	23	Recent college graduate	Married	Couple met on SugarDaddy.com and elope to Costa Rica. On the show, Rosie coined the phrase "Come Through Daddy Drew." After the show aired, Drew's financing came into question after tax liens became public.
3	Bill Hutchinson	60	President of Dunhill Partners Inc	Dating	Bill convinces Briana to make a major move to Miami, FL, despite concerns from her family
3	Briana Ramirez	21	Hostess	Dating	Bill convinces Briana to make a major move to Miami, FL, despite concerns from her family
4	Shawn Isaac	29	Rapper and Investor	Dating	While Kate, 34, has wedding bells on her mind, she begins to question if everything is what it seems. In their final episode, Shawn gives Kate a "diamond" bracelet that turns out to be Cubic zirconia. This couple has previously appeared on other reality shows.
4	Kate London	34	Singer	Dating	While Kate, 34, has wedding bells on her mind, she begins to question if everything is what it seems. In their final episode, Shawn gives Kate a "diamond" bracelet that turns out to be Cubic zirconia. This couple has previously appeared on other reality shows.
5	Katie Hamilton	37	Entrepreneur	Dating	Katie is the ex-wife of baseball player Josh Hamilton. Kolton is a friend of Katie's daughter
5	Kolton Pierce	23	Singer	Dating	Katie is the ex-wife of baseball player Josh Hamilton. Kolton is a friend of Katie's daughter
6	Gentille Chhun	45	Real estate agent and Investor	Single	Gentille's friends question Brian's motives. During the season, the couple get engaged, but ultimately break-up on the day of their wedding. After the season aired, the legitimacy of their relationship came into question.
6	Brian Bru (also known as Dave Smith)	48	Construction worker and Actor	Single	Gentille's friends question Brian's motives. During the season, the couple get engaged, but ultimately break-up on the day of their wedding. After the season aired, the legitimacy of their relationship came into question.

== Episodes ==
Season	Episodes	Originally released	
Season	Episodes	First released	Last released
1	10	July 10, 2019	September 11, 2019
2	16	August 5, 2020	TBA

=== Season 1 ===
No. overall	No. in season	Title	Original release date	U.S. viewers (millions)
1	1	"Can't Buy My Love"	July 10, 2019	N/A
2	2	"Million Dollar Problems"	July 17, 2019	N/A
3	3	"My Secret Sugar Daddy"	July 24, 2019	N/A
4	4	"Royal Pains"	July 31, 2019	N/A
5	5	"No Pressure, No Diamond"	August 7, 2019	N/A
6	6	"Bling in The Big Apple"	August 14, 2019	N/A
7	7	"A Constructive Proposal"	August 21, 2019	N/A
8	8	"The Secret Is Out"	August 28, 2019	N/A
9	9	"Diamonds Aren't Forever"	September 4, 2019	N/A
10	10	"Marriage or Money?"	September 11, 2019	N/A

=== Season 2 ===
No. overall	No. in season	Title	Original release date	U.S. viewers (millions)
11	1	"Steaks with Snakes"	August 5, 2020	N/A
12	2	"Rich Man, Poor Plan"	August 12, 2020	N/A
13	3	"Daddy Issues"	August 19, 2020	N/A
14	4	"I Can't Get No Satisfaction"	August 26, 2020	N/A
15	5	"Birthdays, Babies, and Blowups"	September 2, 2020	N/A
16	6	"Mother's Point of View"	September 9, 2020	N/A
17	7	"An Indecent Proposal"	September 16, 2020	N/A
18	8	"Rough Waters Ahead"	September 23, 2020	N/A
19	9	"Love On the Rocks"	September 30, 2020	N/A
20	10	"Put a Ring (Back) On It"	October 7, 2020	N/A
Special
21	–	"The Journey So Far: Part 1"	December 30, 2020	N/A
22	–	"The Journey So Far: Part 2"	January 20, 2021	N/A
Season
23	11	"Marriage Material"	January 27, 2021	N/A
24	12	"Fear and Lambos in Las Vegas"	February 3, 2021	N/A
25	13	"Mothers Know Best?"	February 10, 2021	N/A
26	14	"Save the Date"	February 17, 2021	N/A
27	15	"Engagements and Ultimatums"	February 24, 2021	N/A
28	16	"Swimmers and Sinking Plans"	March 3, 2021	N/A
29	17	"Cracks in the Commitment"	March 10, 2021	N/A
30	18	"Rodney, It's Your Mama"	March 17, 2021	N/A
31	19	"Island Time"	March 24, 2021	N/A
32	20	"Who's the Queen?"	March 31, 2021	N/A
