= Extreme Couponing =

American reality television series

- Genre: Reality
- Created by: Gomez Eli
- Country of origin: United States
- Original language: English
- No. of seasons: 5
- No. of episodes: 47

Production
- Executive producer: Matt Sharp
- Running time: approx. 22 minutes
- Production company: Sharp Entertainment

Original release
- Network: TLC
- Release: December 29, 2010 – December 4, 2012

Extreme Couponing (renamed Extreme Couponing: All-Stars for its third season) is an American reality television entertainment series produced by Sharp Entertainment and aired on cable network TLC in the United States and Canada.

== History ==
Extreme couponing is an activity that combines shopping skills with couponing in an attempt to save as much money as possible while accumulating the most groceries. The concept of "extreme couponers" was first mentioned by The Wall Street Journal on March 8, 2010, in an article entitled "Hard Times Turn Coupon Clipping Into the Newest Extreme Sport". On March 25, 2010, ABC Nightline followed up with its Season 3 premiere with a segment entitled "Extreme Couponing Competition: How Far Can $50 Go?"

TLC's Extreme Couponing is a show about shoppers who make extensive and focused use of coupons to save money while accumulating large quantities of goods. It was previewed in December 2010; after surpassing network expectations with more than 2 million viewers, it received a series order and began regular airings in April 2011.

On June 6, 2011, TLC announced it ordered a second season of Extreme Couponing. It premiered on Wednesday, September 28, 2011.

The third season debuted on May 28, 2012.

On November 20, 2015, the show returned to Discovery Family, a sister network to TLC, for a special episode Greatest Givers: Extreme Couponing for its run during the Thanksgiving season.

== Reception ==
The New York Times columnist Virginia Heffernan described the show as "a deceptively simple look at the complex drama of American spending and the paradoxes of parsimony". E! Online's critic Jennifer Arrow called it a "recessionista series" marked by "a lot of tawdry, exploitative 'reality'" and participants "just doing their crazy best to stretch dollars and provide a little more for their families". Ken Tucker of Entertainment Weekly noted that the show "has elicited some extreme reactions", and called it "a canny example of two elements floating through the country right now", citing "a fascination with extreme behavior as it's filtered through reality TV" and "the fact that a lot of people don't have as much money as they used to".

The show has come under fire by consumer bloggers and experts such as Jill Cataldo for potential coupon misuse on the show. Actions such as the use of coupons for incorrect items, using counterfeit coupons, and encouraging compulsive hoarding have been cited as reasons to question the show's authenticity.

== Episodes ==
=== Series overview ===
Season	Episodes	Originally released	
Season	Episodes	First released	Last released
1	13	December 26, 2010	June 15, 2011
2	12	September 9, 2011	November 23, 2011
3	6	December 27, 2011	January 17, 2012
4	8	May 30, 2012	June 25, 2012
5	8	November 12, 2012	December 4, 2012

=== Season 1 (2010–2011) ===
No. overall	No. in season	Title	Original release date	Prod. code
1	1	"Pilot"	December 29, 2010	100-60
2	2	"J'aime & Tiffany"	March 23, 2011	101
3	3	"Rebecca & Jessica"	March 30, 2011	102
4	4	"Tai and Tarin & Nathan"	April 13, 2011	103
5	5	"Missy & Amy"	April 20, 2011	104
6	6	"Desirae & Stephanie"	April 27, 2011	105
7	7	"Chris & Antoinette"	May 4, 2011	106
8	8	"Amber & Tammilee"	May 11, 2011	107
9	9	"Chrystie & Treasure"	May 18, 2011	108
10	10	"Amber & Amanda"	May 25, 2011	109
11	11	"Kelly & Rebecca"	June 1, 2011	110
12	12	"Joni & Angelique"	June 8, 2011	112
13	13	"Scott & Jen"	June 15, 2011	111

=== Season 2 (2011) ===
No. overall	No. in season	Title	Original release date	Prod. code
14	1	"Judy & Faatima"	September 12, 2011	201
15	2	"April & Carla"	September 21, 2011	202
16	3	"Erin & Shavon"	September 28, 2011	203
17	4	"Michelle & Kelly"	October 5, 2011	204
18	5	"Michelle & Tyler"	October 12, 2011	205
19	6	"Callie & Kelly"	October 19, 2011	206
20	7	"Perry & Melissa"	October 26, 2011	207
21	8	"Katherine & Joel"	November 2, 2011	208
22	9	"Heather & Bree"	November 9, 2011	209
23	10	"Missy & Nicole"	November 16, 2011	210
24	11	"KT & Erin"	November 23, 2011	211
25	12	"Chris & Joni"	November 30, 2011	212

=== Season 3: All-Stars (2011–2012) ===
Shoppers compete in a reality series that features 12 of the best "Extreme Couponing" savers in 30-minute challenges to see who can save the most on $500 worth of merchandise, which is then donated to charity.

No. overall	No. in season	Title	Original release date	Prod. code
26	1	"Carla vs. Faatima"	December 27, 2011	301
27	2	"Chris vs. Michelle"	January 17, 2012	302
28	3	"Jen vs. Joni"	January 24, 2012	303
29	4	"Antoniette vs. Judy"	February 7, 2012	304
30	5	"Jessica vs. Perry"	February 14, 2012	305
31	6	"Callie vs. Melissa"	February 21, 2012	306

=== Season 4 (2012) ===
No. overall	No. in season	Title	Original release date	Prod. code
32	1	"Erin & Dominique"	May 28, 2012	401
33	2	"Cole & Angelique"	June 4, 2012	402
34	3	"Jeff & Kelly"	June 25, 2012	403
35	4	"Joyce & Aprille"	July 2, 2012	404
36	5	"Adrienne & Sarah"	July 9, 2012	405
37	6	"Lisa & April"	July 16, 2012	406
38	7	"Jane & Judy"	July 23, 2012	407
39	8	"Krista & Amanda"	July 30, 2012	408

=== Season 5 (2012) ===
No. overall	No. in season	Title	Original release date	Prod. code
40	1	"Rudy & Gia"	October 16, 2012	501
41	2	"Julie & Faatima"	October 23, 2012	502
42	3	"April & Chastity"	October 30, 2012	503
43	4	"Pam & Broderick"	November 6, 2012	504
44	5	"Susan & Cole"	November 13, 2012	505
45	6	"Maryann & Haley"	November 20, 2012	506
46	7	"Amanda & Jess"	December 4, 2012	507
47	8	"Zadia & Briana"	December 11, 2012	508

== See also ==
- Extreme Cheapskates
