= The Late Nite Celebrity Show =

The Late Nite Celebrity Show is a Ghanaian television program hosted by Dzifa Affainie on e.tv Ghana.

The TV program was initially known as The Soccer Celebrity Show as a result of the World Cup hosted by South Africa in 2010 and later changed into The Late Nite Celebrity Show. It is a talk show, in which major figures in Ghana and the Ghanaian diaspora are interviewed.
