= Global Malaria Action Plan =

Plan for global malaria control and elimination

Global Malaria Action Plan (GMAP) is the first single comprehensive blueprint for global malaria control and elimination. It outlines strategies, costs, goals and timelines designed to build on the trajectory of recent successes in malaria control, moving towards full malaria control and beyond in countries across the globe.

The GMAP was developed by the Roll Back Malaria (RBM) Partnership and endorsed at the 2008 MDG Malaria Summit on September 25, 2008, in New York City.

The GMAP presents (i) a comprehensive overview of the global malaria landscape, (ii) an evidence-based approach to deliver effective prevention and treatment to all people at risk and (iii) an estimate of the annual funding needs to achieve the goals of the RBM Partnership for 2010, 2015 and beyond.

The targets of the GMAP are to:

- Achieve universal coverage, as recently called for by the UN Secretary-General), for all populations at risk with locally appropriate interventions for prevention and case management by 2010 and sustain universal coverage until local field research suggests that coverage can gradually be targeted to high risk areas and seasons only, without risk of a generalized resurgence;
- Reduce global malaria cases from 2000 levels by 50% in 2010 and by 75% in 2015;*
- Reduce global malaria deaths from 2000 levels by 50% in 2010 and to near zero preventable deaths in 2015;
- Eliminate malaria in 8-10 countries by 2015 and afterwards in all countries in the pre-elimination phase today; and
- In the long term, eradicate malaria world-wide by reducing the global incidence to zero through progressive elimination in countries.

To achieve these targets, the GMAP outlines a three-part global strategy:

1. control malaria to reduce the current burden and sustain control as long as necessary,
2. eliminate malaria over time country by country and
3. research new tools and approaches to support global control and elimination efforts.

The current tools to track implementation of GMAP are so called Country roadmaps.
