= The Jamaica Star =

The Jamaica Star is a major newspaper in Jamaica often cited as a resource for the latest controversies in Jamaica.

According to an advertisement in Editor & Publisher in 1965, the Star was one of the first papers to carry the King Features Syndicate's coloring and comics page for children.
