= List of Soukous musicians =

List of prominent soukous musicians and musical groups:

- Aurlus Mabélé
- Awilo Longomba
- Bozi Boziana
- Diblo Dibala
- Dindo Yogo
- Empire Bakuba
- Evoloko Jocker
- Fally Ipupa
- Ferré Gola
- François Luambo
- Kanda Bongo Man
- Kasaloo Kyanga
- King Kester Emeneya
- Koffi Olomide
- Les Quatre Étoiles
- Loketo
- Mav Cacharel
- Mbilia Bel
- Meiway
- Mose Fan Fan
- Monique Séka
- Nyboma
- Oliver N'Goma
- Orchestra Makassy
- Papa Wemba
- Pépé Kallé
- Quartier Latin International
- Remmy Ongala
- Rigo Star
- Sam Fan Thomas
- Sam Mangwana
- Samba Mapangala
- Tshala Muana
- Werrason
- Yondo Sister
- Zaiko Langa Langa
- Souzy Kasseya
- Syran Mbenza
