= Virunga Volcano =

Studio album by Samba Mapangala
- Released: 1990
- Genre: Soukous
- Label: Earthworks; Virgin
- Producer: Justus Musyoka Kasoya

Samba Mapangala chronology
| Paris-Nairobi (1990) | Virunga Volcano (1990) | Feet on Fire (1992) |

Virunga Volcano is an album by the Congolese musician Samba Mapangala, released in 1990. He is credited with his band, Orchestre Virunga. The album was first released, in Europe, in 1985. "Malako" was a hit in Africa, and is regarded as a perennial classic. The album was a breakthrough for Mapangala, and led to steady international touring.

== Production ==
The album was produced by Justus Musyoka Kasoya. The album's sound is marked by double saxophones and vocals in Lingala and Swahili.

== Critical reception ==
Professional ratings
Review scores
| Source | Rating |
|---|---|
| AllMusic | 4.5/5 stars |
| Robert Christgau | A− |
| MusicHound World: The Essential Album Guide | 4.5/5 stars |

Robert Christgau wrote that "Virunga's snaky bass and nimble guitar come off as spaced and delicate as the falsetto leads Mapangala trades with Fataki, his only permanent sideman, and the twin saxophones are low-budget funky, their cheesy embouchure stuck between alto and soprano." The Gazette determined that "there are delicious guitar and saxophone performances, undulating bass lines—and it's thoroughly absorbing, a silkier, jazzier sound than the modern rat-tat-tat of Zairean soukous"; the paper later labeled the album "a classic." The Herald-American called Virunga Volcano "electrified and funky, borrowing as much from Western pop as from Kenyan tradition."

The Los Angeles Times noted that "the real ace in the hole is Mapangala's strategic use of horns for earthy, bluesy interjections—their mournful harmonizing is crucial in elevating 'Maloko' to genuine classic status." In 2001, The Sunday Telegraph deemed Virunga Volcano "one of the great guitar discs in the history of African music, also blessed by Mapangala's warm vocals."

== Track listing ==
| No. | Title | Length |
|---|---|---|
| 1. | "Malako" |
| 2. | "Ahmed Sabit" |
| 3. | "Virunga" |
| 4. | "Yembele" |
| 5. | "Neliya" |
| 6. | "Mansita" |
