= Orchestre Sinza Kotoko =

Congolese soukous band (1960s–1980s)

- Origin: Brazzaville
- Genres: Soukous; Congolese rumba
- Instruments: Vocals; guitar; percussion
- Years active: 1960s–1980s
- Label: Pathé Marconi
- Past members: Jacques Kimbembe "Mouss"; Gabriel Dianzolo "Ya Gaby"; Miguel Samba; Makosso; Erouet Nkounkou; Atos; José Mabélé; Alphonse Lucas Bahouka; Anatole Bokassa; Michel Mampouya; Fidèle Samba; Yacinthe Malonga; Pierre Moutouari

Orchestre Sinza Kotoko (also known as Orchestre Sinza, Sinza Kotoko, or simply Sinza) was a pioneering Congolese soukous band founded in 1964 by guitarist Jacques Kimbembe "Mouss" in Brazzaville. Initially named as Super Band or Super Tumba, the band adopted the name Orchestre Sinza Kotoko in 1965. It is widely regarded as a seminal innovator of soukous and played a crucial role in redefining Congolese popular music through its distinct combination of conversational vocal styles, sebene-driven guitar improvisations, and a celebratory 4/4 rhythmic base.

Kimbembe's signature use of doubled eighth-note phrasing, diverging from the conventional quarter-note structure, generated a free-flowing and dance-inviting feel that energized the band's sound and made their interludes especially suited for dance. Sinza Kotoko featured a notable lineup that included Kimbembe (lead guitar), Gabriel Dianzolo "ya Gaby" (bandleader and acoustic guitar), Miguel Samba (bass), Makosso (acoustic guitar), Luc Erouet Nkounkou (drums), Atos and José Mabélé (saxophones), along with a host of singers and instrumentalists, including Alphonse Lucas Bahouka, Anatole Bokassa, Michel Mampouya, Fidèle Samba, and Yacinthe Malonga, who joined the group later to complete the lineup.

With a discography comprising over sixty records produced between 1969 and 1975, the band rose to prominence with breakout hits "Abetina", "Eze Marceline" (by Jacques Kimbembe), "Qui Vivra Verra", "Mayoto", "Africa Complet" (by Anatole Bokassa), and "Wa Ba Nkandi Tetoka" (by Alphonse Bahouka), many of which were released through Pathé Marconi. As noted by Congolese musicologist Clément Ossinondé, the band dissolved by the 1980s.

== History ==
=== Early 1960: Formation and career beginnings ===
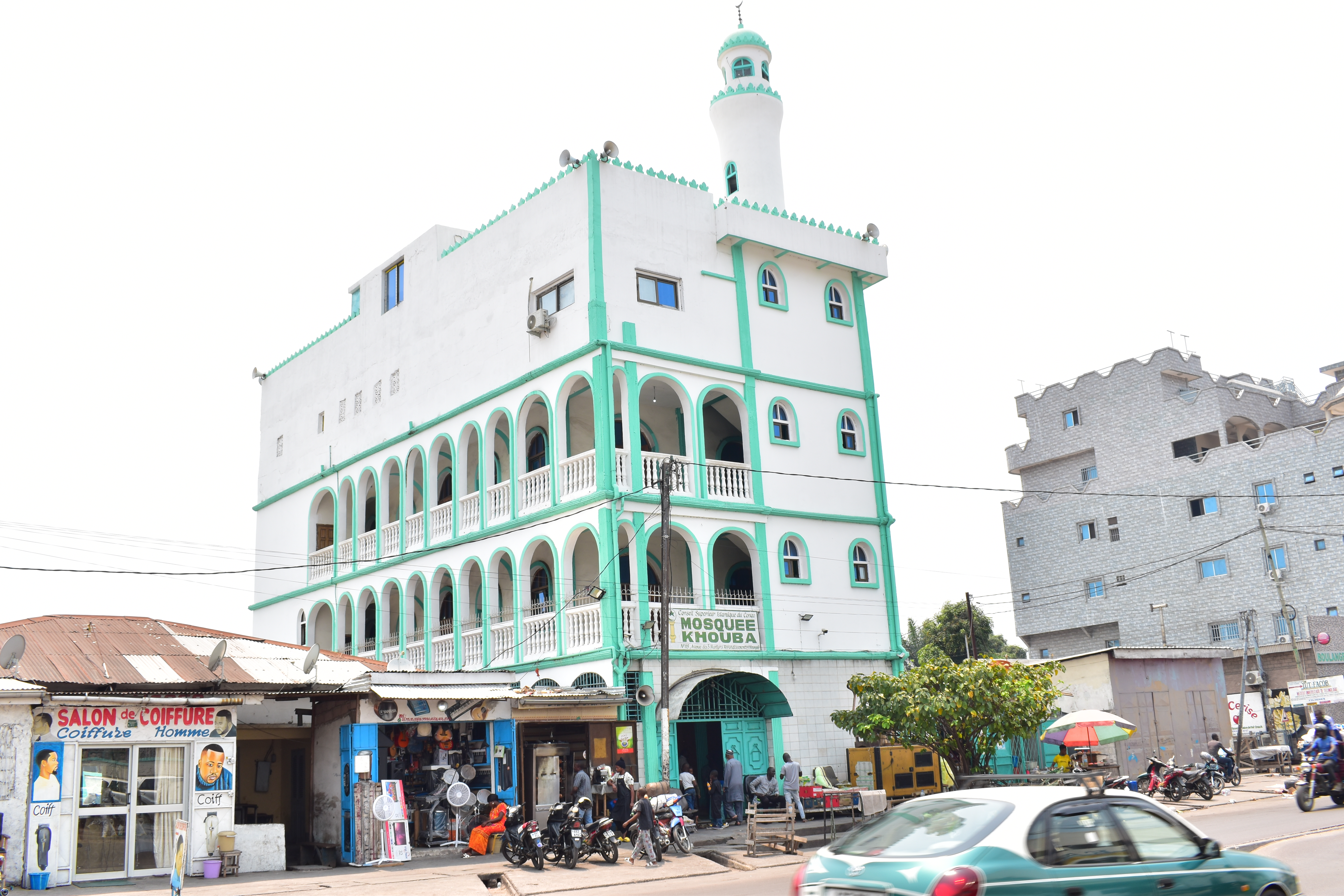
A view of Ouenzé, where the band made their official debut.

Orchestre Sinza Kotoko was founded in Brazzaville in 1964. Its early designation is a subject of debate: British music historian Gary Stewart identifies the band's initial name as Super Band, while Congolese musicologist Clément Ossinondé refers to it as Super Tumba. According to oral accounts preserved by Don Fadel, a Congolese physician, musician, and music historian, a musician disillusioned with his career sold his instruments to a group of young enthusiasts in Ouenzé, who adopted both his instruments and the name Super Band. These youths were passionate about a musical style that would soon be recognized as soukous. The band's formation was profoundly rooted in kinship ties, particularly the Nkaka Biasalu lineage from Boko village (Musi Mbembe). This lineage included Mama Bakanikina (Cécile), Ma Marie, Albert Koufouna (known as Peggy), Mama Ngouri, and Luc Erouet Nkounkou. Mama Bakanikina's son, guitarist Jacques Kimbembe ''Mouss'', formed the core of the group alongside his uncles Peggy and Erouet. Rehearsals were held at Peggy's residence on Kimpanzu Street, near the Madoukoutsekele River, at a site that also housed a small soap-making operation. Peggy served as the band's first manager.

There is some uncertainty regarding the precise birthplace of the band. One account places its origin at 174 Lague Street in Ouenze, Brazzaville's fifth arrondissement, on a plot that later became the Centre de Santé Intégré Jane Vial. This location was owned by Nzouza Nsi Bayimunu, a trader from the Nzungi quarter of Boko and paternal uncle to Kimbembe. Another version cites 1 Mouila Street in Ouenze, near the public swimming pool, as the site of its formation. The band's official debut took place at the Vis-à-Vis bar on Boueta Mbongo Avenue in La Douane, a popular quarter gathering spot. The band eventually adopted the name Orchestre Sinza Kotoko in 1965. The term Sinza, meaning "root" in Kikongo, was chosen as a metaphor of resilience and cultural rootedness. This naming also served as a subtle counter to rival bands such as Tembo (meaning "wind" in Kikongo), which included prominent Brazzaville musicians expelled from Kinshasa in 1964 under Prime Minister Moïse Tshombe's xenophobic policies.

=== Mid-to-late 1960s–1970s: Rise to fame and legacy ===
One of Orchestre Sinza Kotoko's earliest pioneering innovations was soukous, which was rooted in Congolese celebratory traditions. From its inception, they forged a distinctive sound defined by its choppy, syncopated rhythms that remained intense throughout each track. The band's signature interplay came from Kimbembe's expressive lead guitar, whose phrasing often mimicked drummer Luc Erouet Nkounkou's rhythmic patterns, producing an energetic exchange that elevated the sebene instrumental section. Congolese music journalist Audifax Bemba noted that Orchestre Sinza Kotoko distinguished themselves through a fusion of conversational vocal delivery, dynamic lead guitar solos, and a steady 4/4 beat that encouraged collective dancing and celebration. Kimbembe's approach to guitar, favoring doubled eighth notes over traditional quarter notes, gave rise to spontaneous dance sections that brought vitality to their shows. One of their core musical themes was wara, which was a defining element of soukous.

Performing at weddings and malaki (popular festivals), the band contrasted with the structure of Congolese rumba, which was traditionally divided into two parts: a slow, intimate phase characterized by the nkumba dance, and a more exuberant phase of open, uninhibited movement. Orchestre Sinza Kotoko's dance-driven approach, however, favored constant motion and celebration, which helped them to quickly gain popularity across Brazzaville and in towns such as Pointe-Noire, Dolisie, Nkayi, Owando, and Kinkala. Their success eclipsed the influence of the Brazzaville-based band Les Bantous de la Capitale, particularly their signature boucher style, and prompted comparisons to the famed Ghanaian football club Asante Kotoko, then one of Africa's leading teams. In 1968, singer Pierre Moutouari, younger brother of Kosmos Mountouari of the Les Bantous de la Capitale, joined the band and contributed hits like "Vévé", "Ma Loukoula", and "Mahoungou", which were released through Pathé Marconi. These tracks are often credited with marking the beginning of the modern soukous era, which laid the rhythmic groundwork later taken up by Kinshasa-based bands like Bella Bella (led by the Soki brothers) and Zaïko Langa Langa.

==== Impact on the soukous movement and international recognition ====
As soukous gained traction during the 1970s, amateur bands began to proliferate in Brazzaville's working-class quarters and educational institutions. Groups such as Ndimbola Lokolé (with Aurlus Mabélé), Zimbabwe (with Soum Carol), Shamanga (featuring Papito and Mopero Wa Maloba), and Super Tembessa (with Cé Cé Célina), along with school-based bands like Les Techniciens, Chanta Bouita, Groupe Rouge (known for their hit "Vietnam"), and Les Chaminadiens, drew inspiration from the band's style. However, cultural suppression by the Union of Socialist Congolese Youth (UJSC), an organ of the Congolese Party of Labour, restricted artistic freedom and stifled the creative growth of many emerging acts. This contributed to the spread of soukous across the Congo River, where Kinshasa-based bands such as Bella Bella and Zaïko Langa Langa adopted and commercialized the style. During this period, Orchestre Sinza Kotoko maintained a robust lineup, including key figures like Kimbembe, Gabriel Dianzolo "ya Gaby" (bandleader and acoustic guitar), Miguel Samba (bass), Makosso (acoustic guitar), Erouet Nkounkou (drums), saxophonists Atos and José Mabélé, and additional performers such as Alphonse Lucas Bahouka, Anatole Bokassa, Michel Mampouya, Fidèle Samba, and Yacinthe Malonga.

In 1973, they represented the Republic of the Congo at the inaugural Pan-African Youth Festival (Festival panafricain de la jeunesse) in Tunis. Their performance captivated audiences and earned them the gold medal in the presence of international stars like Tabu Ley Rochereau and Afrisa International. During the event, singers Ange Linaud Ndjendo and Théo Théophile Bitsikou of the band Nzoi joined them on stage. After their triumphant return from Tunis, they relocated from their original base in Ouénzé to the Pigalle bar in Bacongo, the current site of the Total Market (marché total). In 1975, a major blow struck the band with the departure of Moutouari, who left to form his own band, Les Sossa. Orchestre Sinza Kotoko's musical influence even extended beyond the Congo; Nigerian-Cameroonian musician Prince Nico Mbarga cited Kimbembe's guitar playing as a key inspiration for his 1976 hit "Sweet Mother", performed with Rocafil Jazz. Ossinondé stated that the band has been defunct since the 1980s.

== Partial discography ==
Year	Title	Details
1969	Side A: "Magali"; Side B: "Ida Na Bossani Te"	Format: Vinyl record; Genre: Congolese rumba; Country: France; Label: Pathé Marconi; No: 2C 006-15.120 M
1970	Side A: "Teti Bolingo"; Side B: "Lelita"	Format: Vinyl record; Genre: Congolese rumba and soukous; Country: France; Label: Pathé Marconi; Series: Succès Africains Et Sud-Américains; No: 2C 006-15 021 M
1970	Side A: "Diables Noirs - Yaka Dia Mama"; Side B: "Elembo Se Ya Yo"	Record company: Les Industries Musicales Et Electriques Pathé Marconi; Format: Vinyl record; Genre: Soukous and Congolese rumba; Country: France; Label: Pathé Marconi; No: 2C 006-15.009
1970	"Mpassi Ya Mbongo"; "Vévé"	Format: Vinyl record; Genre: Soukous and Congolese rumba; Country: France; Label: Pathé Marconi
1972	Side A: "Dipato"; Side B: "Ndimela Ngai Loulou"	Format: Vinyl record; Genre: Soukous and Congolese rumba; Country: France; Label: Pathé Marconi; No: 2C 006-15.190 M
1972	Side A: "Justine"; Side B: "Soukouss Ya Wawa"	Format: Vinyl record; Label: Pathé Marconi; Series: Succès Africains Et Sud-Américains; Genre: Soukous and Congolese rumba; Country: France; No: 2C 006 15 233 M
1973	"Mahoungou"	Format: Single; Label: Pathé Marconi; Composed by: Pierre Moutouari; Genre: Soukous; Country: France
1974	Side A: "Wa Ba Nkandi Tetoka"; Side B: "Eze Marceline"	Record company: Les Industries Musicales Et Electriques Pathé Marconi; Format: Vinyl record; Label: Pathé Marconi; Genre: Soukous and Congolese rumba; Country: France; No: 2C 006 15724 M
	Side A: "Ma Loukoula"; Side B: "Mayoto"	Record company: Les Industries Musicales Et Electriques Pathé Marconi; Format: Vinyl record; Label: Pathé Marconi; Series: Succès Africains Et Sud-Américains; Genre: Soukous and Congolese rumba; Country: France; No: 2C 006-15.096 M
	Side A: "Amelina (Yéké Yéké)"; Side B: "Victorine Na Leli Yo (Rumba)"	Format: Vinyl record; Label: Pathé Marconi; Series: Succès Africains Et Sud-Américains; Genre: Soukous and Congolese rumba; Country: France; No: 2C 006-15064 M
1975	76	Format: Compilation album; Genre: Congolese rumba and soukous; Compiled by Fayette Blaise Mikano
1975	Les Grands Succès Africains Vol.2 (Ma Loukoula, Mahoungou)	Format: Vinyl record; Genre: Congolese rumba and soukous; Label: Pathé Marconi; Country: France
1977	Dix Ans D'Animation	Format: Vinyl record; Label: Electromat Records; Genre: Soukous and Congolese rumba; Country: Nigeria
	Lélé - Mama Na Blood	Format: Vinyl record; Label: 3A Production; Genre: Soukous and Congolese rumba; Country: France
