= Oliver N'Goma =

- Born: 23 March 1959; Mayumba, Gabon
- Died: 7 June 2010 (aged 51) Libreville, Gabon
- Genres: Zouk, Soukous, Afropop
- Occupations: Singer, songwriter
- Years active: 1988–2010
- Label: Lusafrica BMG

Oliver N'Goma (23 March 1959 – 7 June 2010) was a Gabonese afro-zouk and soukous singer and guitarist. He was born in Mayumba in south-west Gabon in 1959. He is best known for his 1990 song Bane.

== Early life ==
N'Goma's was first exposed to music by his father, a teacher and harmonium player. N'Goma took his first music lessons at the age of eight, and began performing for audiences in 1971, after his family left Mayumba for the Gabonese capital, Libreville so that he could attend school. While taking classes in accounting, he joined the school band, called Capo Sound, with whom he learned to play guitar. The group performed at formal events, honing N'Goma's ability to perform on-stage. In 1988, N'Goma's love of film led him to a job with Gabon TV, where he worked in France as a cameraman.

== Career ==
In Paris, N'Goma completed his demo tapes, which he had recorded at home in Gabon. He shared this music with Manu Lima, a well-known Cape Verdean record producer. Lima was impressed with N'Goma's music and handled the artistic direction of his first record, Bane, which enjoyed modest success until receiving heavy airplay in Africa. In particular, the title track rose in popularity in Africa, France, and the French West Indies, as a party anthem. The album is one of the best-selling African albums to date.

N'Goma released a second album, Adia in December 1995, again working with Manu Lima. Five years later, N'Goma released his third album, Seva, without the help of Lima. In 2006, the pair reunited for Saga. A greatest hits compilation, Best of Oliver N'Goma was released in 2004.

== Discography ==
- Bane (1990)
- Adia (1995)
- Séva (2001)
- Saga (2006)
- Lusa (1990)
- Icole(1990)
- Muetse (1995)
- Ellie(-)
- Nelly(-)
- Helena(-)
- Nge(-)
- Alphosine(-)
- Shado(-)
- Elode(-)

== Death ==
Oliver N'Goma died from kidney failure, which he had battled for the last two years of his life, on 7 June 2010 at Omar Bongo Hospital in Libreville, Gabon.

== In popular culture ==
- His song "Adia" was featured in the Claire Denis film Beau Travail.
- His song "Nge" was sampled in the Fivio Foreign song Self Made.

== See also ==
- List of Soukous musicians
