= Monique Séka =

Ivorian singer

- Born: Séka; November 22, 1965 (age 60); Ivory Coast
- Genres: Zouk, Afrobeat, Soukous
- Occupation: Singer-songwriter
- Instrument: Vocals
- Years active: 1987–present

Monique Séka was born on November 22, 1965. She was nicknamed the queen of Afro-zouk music and is a singer from the Ivory Coast. With the musical fusion that she generates; Monique Seka's Afro-zouk music is popular across places like the Ivory Coast, Africa, the Caribbean and the Indian Ocean.

== Biography ==
Séka was born in the Ivory Coast to Okoi Seka, an Ivorian singer from the 90s and an Ivorian-born mother of Lebanese descent. She represents the third generation of a musical dynasty of Ivory Coast. Seka is the daughter of Seka Okoi, an Ivorian singer famous in the 1970s. Seka was apprenticed by her father before joining the RTI Orchestra. That was the time she started to experiment mixing zouk and rhythms to create Afro Zouk.

Seka released her first album, Tantie Affoué, in 1985. In 1989, she signed the production of her music to Cape Verdian keyboardist Manu Lima and released her album "Missounwa". This mixture of zouk and African rhythms travelled beyond the African borders, and asserted recognition in the press and media.

In 1994, she again calls on Manu Lima for the arrangements of her new album and returned to the country with the album "Okaman". Subsequent albums of hers include "Adéba" in 1997, "Yélélé" in 1999 and many "best of" with new titles: "Anthology" in 1999, "15 years 15 success" in 2003, "Obligada" in 2005, etc. Her success has earned her the support of many artists from various musical backgrounds such as "Yaye Demin", a hit song with Meiway.

== Personal life ==
Séka is married to Dominique Richard, a founding member of Radio Sun, the first Afro-Caribbean radio station. They have one child.

== Discography ==
=== Albums ===
- 1986 : Tantie affoué
- 1989 : Missounwa, Éditions C.B.H.
- 1995 : Okaman, Déclic
- 1997 : Adeba
- 1999 : Yelele, Sony Music
- 2000 : Anthologie
- 2003 : Best of Album, Créon Music
- 2005 : Obligada

== See also ==
- Meiway
- List of Soukous musicians
