= Pierre Moutouari =

Congolese soukous singer (1950–2025)

Pierre Moutouari (3 April 1950 – 8 October 2025) was a Congolese soukous singer. A relatively popular and successful soloist during the post civil-war culture boom of the 1970s, Moutouari was one of the few contemporaries of the early Soukous era still at work.

== Early career ==
Moutouari began his career in 1968 with Orchestre Sinza Kotoko along with his brother, Kosmos Moutouari. Pierre joined Sinza at the threshold of the band's rise to stardom, with a full schedule of live shows around central Africa and the signing of a record contract with Pathé-Marconi. In the same year he won first prize in an amateur singing competition organized by the then Minister for Culture, thus establishing him as an upcoming star.

== Les Sossa and solo career ==
In 1973, Moutouauri won a gold medal in the Festival de Tunis, and in 1975 formed the group Les Sossa. In 1979, Moutouauri moved to Paris to launch a solo career, joining the ranks of music label Safari Ambience. In collaboration with Jacob Desvarieux and skilled guitarist Master Mouana Congo, Moutouari released several albums over the next few years including Le Grand Retour de Pierre Moutouari, Toute Bouge and Dans Tremblement de Terre. Toute Bouge is perhaps his most significant work, spawning such hits as "Aissa" and "Saile".

== Return to Brazzaville ==
In 1986, Moutouari returned to his country of birth, deciding to concentrate on the development of young talent, notably that of his daughter Michaelle Moutouari, releasing the albums Heritage, Monument and Mbolo as duets. Moutouari also busied himself with the promotion and distribution of Congolese music between 1993 and 1999. In 2005, Moutouari released the album Songa Nzila, and in 1996 he signed to the label One1shuttle.

== Death ==
Moutouari died on 8 October 2025, at the age of 75.
