= Prix découvertes RFI =

- Genre: Talent show
- Created by: Radio France Internationale

Prix découvertes RFI is the French-speaking African version of the reality singing competition, RFI Discovery Prize, and was created in 1981 to highlight new musical talents from Africa each year. This show has featured artists such as Tiken Jah Fakoly, Mav Cacharel, Rokia Traoré, Didier Awadi, Amadou and Mariam, Canjo Amissi or Maurice Kirya.

== Coaches and hosts ==
The judging panel is made up of industry professionals, and is each year chaired by notable personalities such as Jacob Desvarieux, Youssou N'Dour, Angélique Kidjo, Passi, Kery James, Richard Bona, A'salfo, and Fally Ipupa. RFI and its partners offer the winner professional support, cross-channel promotion, and promotion on their websites. In addition, the winner receives 10,000 euros and a tour of Africa. They also perform a concert in Paris.

== See also ==
- Radio France Internationale
- The Voice Afrique Francophone
