= Loketo =

French Congolese music group

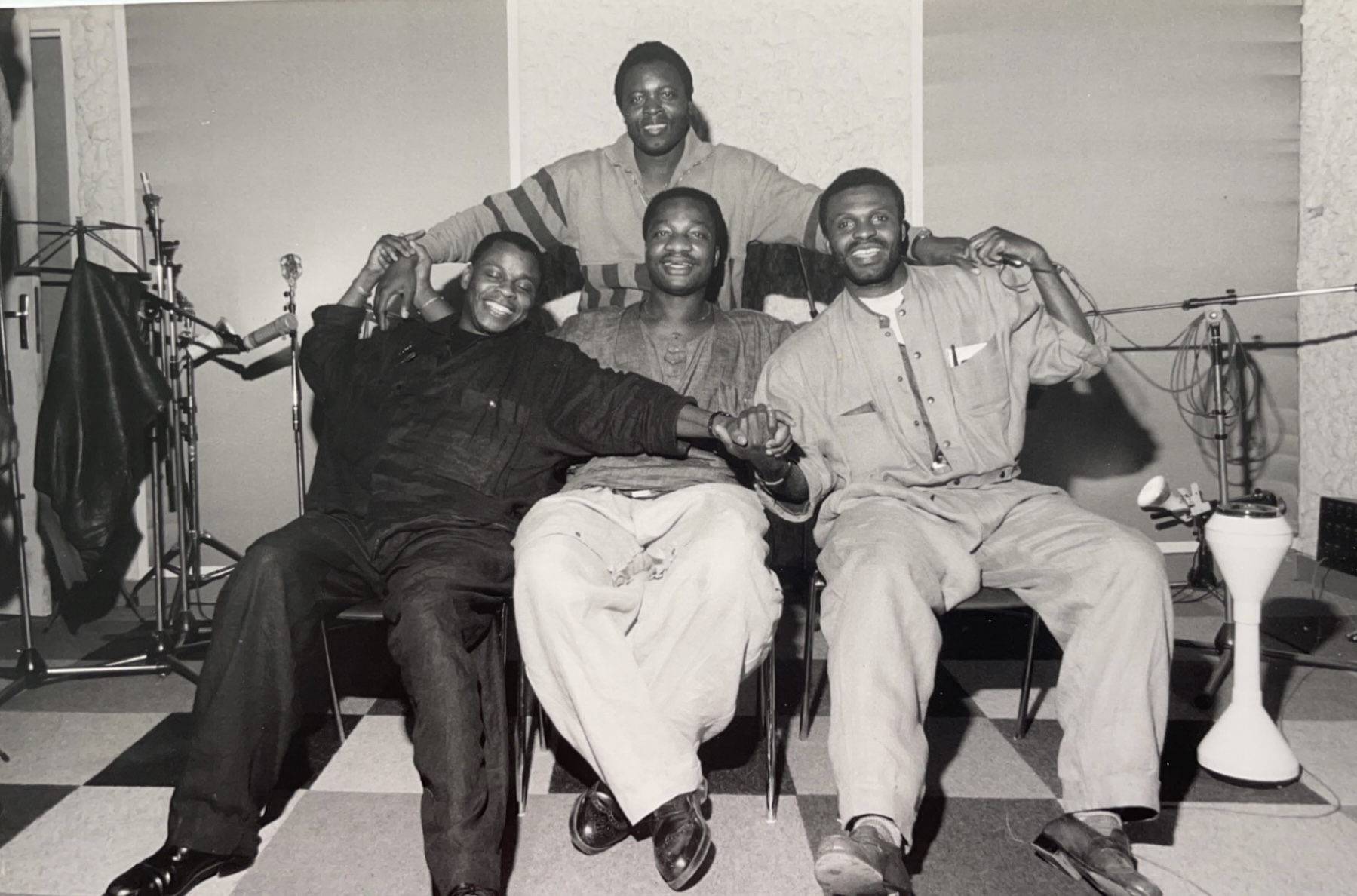
- Left to right: Jean Baron, Aurlus Mabélé, Mav Cacharel; standing: Diblo Dibala.

Background information
- Origin: Paris, France
- Genres: Soukous, African rumba, Ndombolo
- Years active: 1986–1997
- Label: Shanachie
- Past members: Aurlus Mabélé; Diblo Dibala; Mav Cacharel; Jean Baron; Lucien Bokilo; Ronald Rubinel; Dally Kimoko; Miguel Yamba

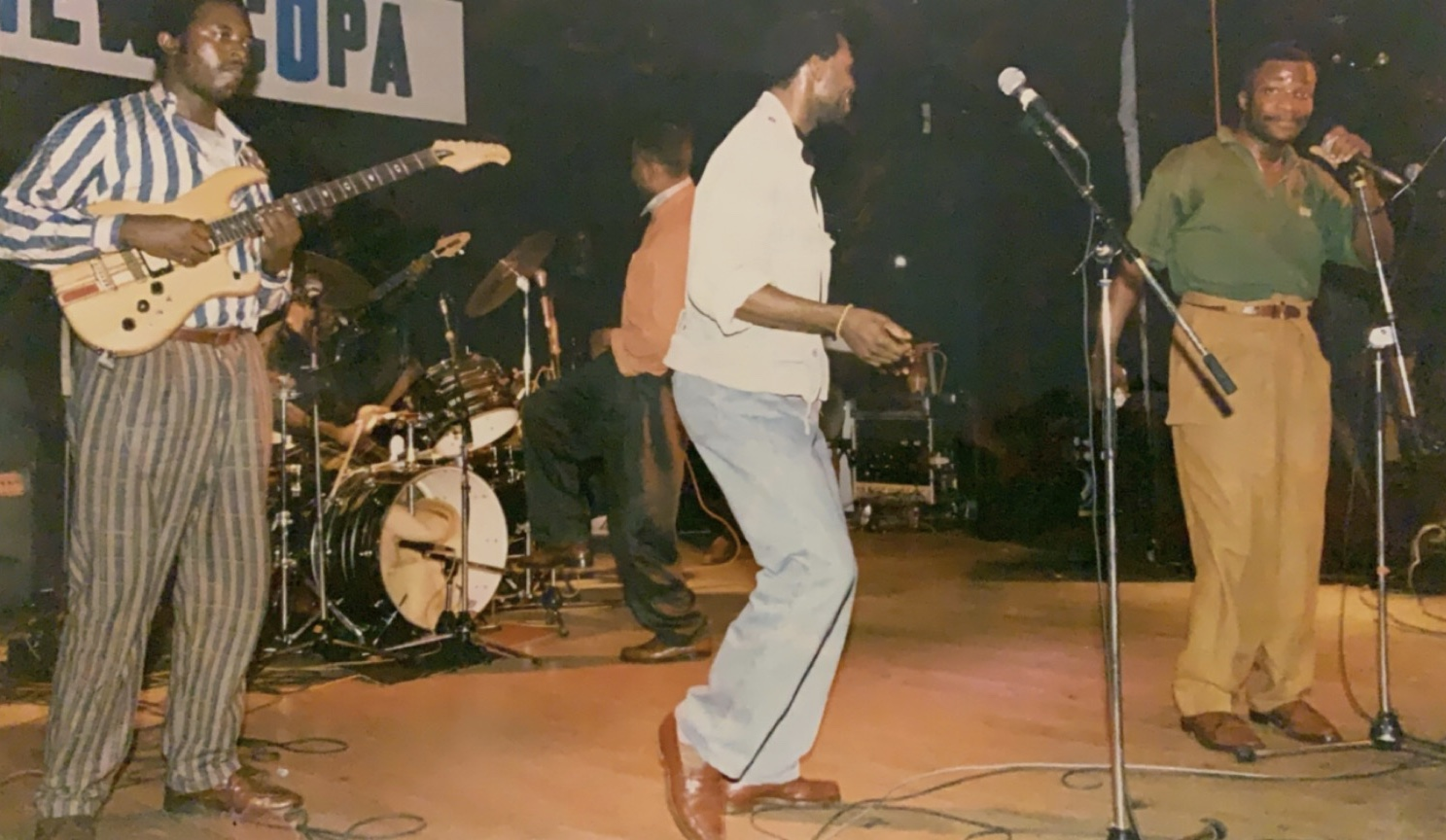
Loketo performing in Paris in 1986.

Loketo was a soukous group formed in Paris, France in 1986 by Congo-Brazzaville singer Aurlus Mabélé, guitarist Diblo Dibala, and singer Mav Cacharel. Mabélé and Cacharel were former members of Ndimbola Lokolé, a band from Brazzaville. The name Loketo means "hips" in Lingala.

Within the Paris soukous scene of the late 1980s, Loketo quickly rose to prominence, with Dibala's guitar work earning him the nickname "Machine Gun," driving a series of dance hits. Dibala later described Loketo's musical contribution as having helped pioneer a faster-paced style of soukous that favored reaching the sebene, the accelerating, guitar-driven climax. A multi-artist compilation described the band as "a sort of Zairian supergroup of 'new generation' musicians known for a super-tight, high-energy show." In 1989, the group performed at SOB's in New York City, marking their arrival on the American music scene.

In 1990, Dibala left the group to form his own band, Matchatcha. Mabélé continued leading the band into the early 1990s, with guitarist Dally Kimoko replacing Dibala, before the group dissolved. Mabélé died on 19 March 2020 in Eaubonne, France, after contracting COVID-19.

== Discography ==
- Trouble (1988)
- Mondo Ry (1989)
- Super Soukous (1989, Shanachie)
- Soukous Trouble (1990)
- Embargo (1991)
- Extra Ball (1991, Shanachie)

== See also ==
- Kanda Bongo Man
