= Yondo Sister =

- Born: Yondo Kusala Denise; 23 April 1958 (age 67); Zaire, Belgian Congo now Democratic Republic of Congo
- Genres: Soukous, kwassa kwassa music
- Occupations: Singer, musician
- Years active: 1980–present
- Labels: Air B. Mas Production, Melodie, T.J.R. Music,

Denise Kusala Yondo (born 23 April 1958), known professionally as Yondo Sister is a Congolese musician mainly associated with the soukous genre of music and the kwassa kwassa dance. She is often referred to as "the queen of soukous" or "the queen of rumba".

== Early life ==
She was born in the city of Bukavu, in a musical family, the daughter of a Congolese father and a Belgian-Congolese mother.

== Career ==
She began her career as a singer in Tabu Ley Rochereau's band L'afrisa International, alongside her sister, Chantal Yondo. She initially planned to become a dancer and credits Rochereau with her switch

== Personal life ==
Yondo currently resides in Paris.

== Discography ==
- FBI (2001)
- Agenda (2002)
- Dernière Minute(1995)
- Deviation (1993)
- Bazo (1991)
- Planete (1999)
- Agenda (2003)
