= Mav Cacharel =

Congolese soukous musician (born 1957)

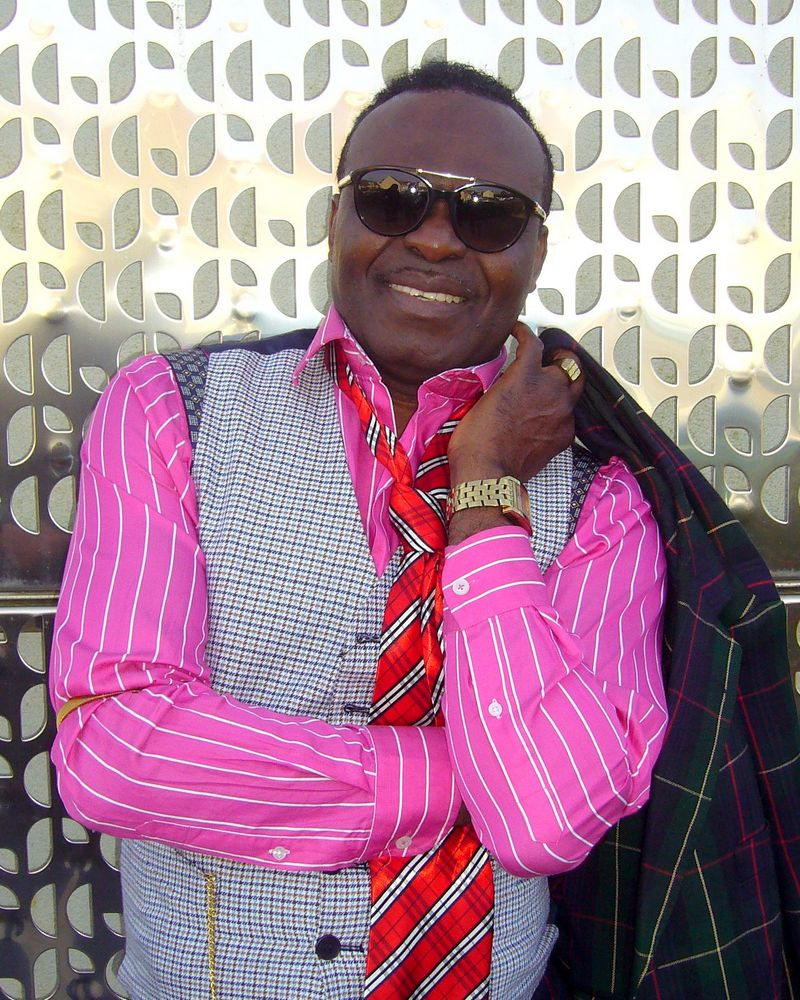
- Cacharel in 2017

Background information
- Born: Hilaire Youla; 14 January 1957 (age 69)
- Origin: Republic of the Congo
- Genres: Soukous
- Occupation: Singer
- Website: https://mavcacharel.fr/

Mav Cacharel (born 14 January 1957) is a Congolese soukous singer. He is one of the many artists who were part of Loketo, the group founded by Aurlus Mabélé and Diblo Dibala, one of the leading Congolese soukous bands of the 1980s. Alongside Geo Bilongo, Mac Baron, Macaire, and Diblo Dibala, Cacharel was among Aurlus Mabélé's most loyal collaborators within Loketo.

== Biography ==
=== Loketo ===
He began performing at age 13 in Brazzaville, Republic of Congo, with his first group Les Ombres. Following a recommendation from Congolese television journalist and presenter Claude Alain, Cacharel joined the band Les Sensas, where he remained until 1974. That same year, he joined forces with Aurlus Mabélé, Jean Baron, and Pedro Wapechkado to establish the soukous band Ndimbola Lokole.

In 1983, he won first prize in the Prix découvertes RFI competition organized by Radio France Internationale. The award led to a tour of Mauritius and appearances at several gala events in Paris and other French cities. After contributing vocals to various African and Caribbean recordings, he released his first record, Chanti Die!, later that year and performed concerts in Paris and the surrounding Île-de-France region in 1984. In 1987, he appeared in the film Black Mic Mac with Loketo, the soukous orchestra established in 1986 by Aurlus Mabélé and Diblo Dibala. During this period, the group toured extensively across the United States, Europe, Africa, and Canada, and released its debut album, Trouble, which featured one of Cacharel's earliest compositions, "Menssa".

=== Kebo and solo ventures ===
In 1988, Cacharel left Loketo and formed his own group, Kebo, with which he toured throughout Europe. He recorded Pour Toi (1989) and was invited to perform at the Festival de Baía das Gatas in Cape Verde. After his return, he founded Les "A" Nanas, a female group, together with Denise Cairo. The group released a self-titled album on the Equateur label. A year later, he resumed touring, performing in Bern (Switzerland), Utrecht and Amsterdam (the Netherlands), La Baule-Escoublac (France), and Fort-de-France (Martinique). He released the album Kebo (1990), followed by Louzolo (1991), and Triple Force (1992). These two albums achieved such success that in 1993 he was invited to appear on a television program in Cameroon, where he returned to perform the following year.

After several years away from recording, Cacharel returned in 1997 with Mokokissa Vol. 1, an album produced by Claude Druck and featuring Sam Sambo, Victor Pelmar, Paul Mathieu, Vincent Lao, Tommy Malela, Colette Duville, Aurélia Druck, and Roland Druck. In 2004 and 2005, he released Kebo Na Brazzaville and Coup de Filet, respectively. The latter was his most recent album and featured four tracks by his friend Jean Baron, who died in February 2005.

It was not until 2007 that Loketo reunited around four of its original members: Aurlus Mabélé, Diblo Dibala, Mack Macaire, and Cacharel himself. Their CD, Réconciliation, symbolized their reunion and the rebuilding of their relationships, as well as celebrating their 20th anniversary. A year later, they released Acte II – Confirmation, a "soukouzouk" album, a fusion of soukous and Caribbean zouk, which they described as modern soukous.

In November 2017, Cacharel returned with a new album entitled Lumière, which included guitarist Diblo Dibala, who performed on nearly all of the tracks.

== Legacy ==
According to Brazzaville's application dossier to the UNESCO Creative Cities Network, Cacharel contributed to the "rise of Parisian soukous". He is regarded as one of the key figures in the development of soukous music and is recognized for helping shape the genre's evolution. The magazine Music in Africa also credits him with having "influenced the evolution of soukous". In 2020, a documentary entitled Paris c'est l'Afrique: Entre Congo et Zaïre ("Paris Is Africa: Between Congo and Zaire") was produced. The film traces the history of African music in France and features several notable artists associated with the movement, including Cacharel.

== Discography ==
- 1987: Chanti Die !
- 1988: Trouble
- 1989: Pour toi
- 1990: Kebo
- 1991: Louzolo
- 1992: Triple force
- 1997: Mokokissa
- 2004: Kebo na Brazzaville
- 2007: Réconciliation
- 2008: Acte II : Confirmation
- 2017: Lumière
