= Aurlus Mabélé =

Congolese singer-songwriter (1953–2020)

- Also known as: Le Grand Gourba
- Born: Benoit Aurélien Miatsonama; 24 October 1953; Brazzaville, French Congo
- Died: 19 March 2020 (aged 66) Eaubonne, France
- Genres: Congolese rumba; soukous
- Occupations: Singer-songwriter; arranger; producer; dancer; bandleader; sapeur
- Instrument: Vocals
- Years active: 1974–2019
- Labels: Totem Music; Afro Rythmes; Jimmy's International Production; Sound Wave Records; WEA Latina; Mélodie Distribution; Editions D'Ivoire; Debs Music
- Formerly of: Les Ndimbola Lokole; Loketo

Benoit Aurélien Miatsonama (24 October 1953 – 19 March 2020) known professionally as Aurlus Mabélé, was a Congolese singer-songwriter, arranger, producer, dancer, bandleader, and sapeur. Often referred to as the "King of Soukous", he was one of the leading figures in the genre during a career spanning more than three decades. He sold more than 10 million albums worldwide and helped popularize soukous outside Africa, especially in France, Belgium, and the Caribbean. His hits include "Betty", "Asta Di", "Loketo", "Vacances aux Antilles", "Zebola", "Femme ivoirienne", "Ebouka", "Sans frontières", "Waka Waka", and "Liste Rouge".

Born in Poto-Poto, Brazzaville, Mabélé began his musical career as a student in the early 1970s. In 1974, he co-founded the band Les Ndimbola Lokole, before relocating to Paris in 1981, where he became a central figure in the city's growing Congolese music scene. His collaboration with producer Jimmy Houetinou yielded Africa Mousso (Femme d'Afrique) in 1986, which brought him recognition, and buoyed by its success, Mabélé joined forces with Diblo Dibala, Mav Cacharel, Blondin Wabacha, and John Boxingo Macaire to form the "loose-knit" band Loketo, which became a fixture of dance clubs across Europe and the Americas during the late 1980s. With Loketo, Mabélé modernized the modern soukous sound by dispensing with the genre's traditional slow introduction in favor of an immediate, guitar-driven sebene, and popularizing dances such as kwassa kwassa, madiaba, and soundama. After parting ways with Dibala in 1991, Mabélé continued to lead Loketo and later collaborated with guitarist Dally Kimoko and released the commercially successful album Embargo that year. He continued recording and performing internationally until he died in 2020.

== Life and career ==
=== 1953–1985: Early life, Les Ndimbola Lokole and releases ===
Aurlus Mabélé was born Benoit Aurélien Miatsonama on 24 October 1953 in the Poto-Poto arrondissement of Brazzaville, Republic of Congo. He began his musical career as a student during the 1970s, a decade that musicologist Clément Ossinondé described as a period of rapid musical innovation, with many young musicians seeking to develop distinctive musical styles.

In 1974, together with fellow Congolese musicians including Mav Cacharel, Jean Baron Ngouala, Pedro Wapechkado, Cortey Maboundou, and brothers Eddy and Darry Diaboua, Mabélé co-founded the band Les Ndimbola Lokole. He established himself as a songwriter whose lyrics centered on themes that appealed to young audiences. According to Ossinondé, Ndimbola Lokole's music reflected a break from the dominant musical and social norms of the period.

After leaving Brazzaville, Mabélé moved to Paris in 1981, where he made jewelry and took on odd jobs while trying to revive his music career. In 1982, Totem Music released his debut four-track album, Na La Vie, which included the songs "Na La Vie", "Mama Kolela", "Lisette", and "Rachel". It received little attention after Totem Music shut down soon afterward. Mabélé wrote all of the songs, while the record was directed by Tanawa and featured bassist Kinzonzi André Du Soleil, drummer David Tochino, lead guitarists Souzy Kasseya and Syran Mbenza, and rhythm guitarists Petit Poisson and Rigo Star. He followed it up in 1983 with Nicoletta, Fille des Antilles, released through Afro Rythmes, which brought together bassist Miguel Yamba, drummer Ti Jean, mi-solo guitarist Maïka Munan, lead guitarist Diblo Dibala, rhythm guitarist Mayindou Jean Pirate, and saxophonists Charly Bokher and Féfé Priso.

=== 1986–1988: Africa Mousso (Femme D'Afrique) and Loketo ===
In 1986, Mabélé met music producer and label executive Jimmy Houetinou, the founder of Jimmy's Production, also known as Jimmy's International Production (JIP) in Paris. Together they released Africa Mousso (Femme D'Afrique). In Bambara, Africa Mousso means "Woman of Africa". Dibala played lead guitar and co-arranged the music, supported by Pablo Lubadika Porthos on rhythm guitar, Remy Salomon on bass, Ti Jean on drums, Houetinou on electronic drums, and A. Jean Luc on violin, cello, and synthesizer. Mabélé sang lead vocals, played the maracas and cloche, a bell-shaped percussion instrument, and co-produced the album with Houetinou. The backing vocals were sung by Cacharel, Wapechkado, Denise Cairo, Jeanne Dah, and Lea Lignanzi. Musicologist Gary Stewart noted that the album's four up-tempo tracks echoed Dibala's earlier work with Kanda Bongo Man, though they lacked the latter's melodic sophistication. Even so, Africa Mousso (Femme D'Afrique) became a "club favorite" and won the 1986 Maracas d'Or award for French Africa's Best Pop Record. Buoyed by album success that year, Mabélé joined Dibala, Cacharel, Blondin Wabacha, and John Boxingo Macaire to form the "loose-knit" band Loketo. The band's name came from a repeated chant on Africa Mousso (Femme D'Afrique) and is the Lingala word for "hip".

Loketo developed a style centered on dance music, with songs containing a "minimal story-line with lots of cries of animation" by atalakus backed by Dibala's "rapid-fire riffs". Houetinou and Mabélé co-produced the band's four-track album Maracas D'Or, which included "Femme Ivoirienne", "Mwana Mboka", "Tchimbé Mwen Fô", and "Cameroun OK!". "Femme Ivoirienne" became the biggest hit. Houetinou then produced Super K, released under Dibala's name in 1987, and later Trouble under the Loketo name, both of which reflected the direction soukous was taking at the time. The band relied on a small lineup and sparse instrumentation while maintaining an intense, fast-paced sound. In Paris, fans dubbed the style TGV soukous after les trains grande vitesse, France's high-speed trains. Despite an obvious tendency toward monotony, the sound was attractive, especially in nightclubs, where the "first notes of a Loketo track would summon a crowd to the dance floor". Stewart wrote that while Loketo helped increase the speed of soukous, Kanda Bongo Man had already started the trend. Stewart also noted that Dibala's earlier recordings with Kanda at Afro Rythmes were an influential part of the move toward the fast-paced, stripped-down soukous style that followed the music of African All Stars and Loukelo Samba's Innovation series. According to the Museum of Modern Art, Loketo became one of the leading dance bands in Europe and the Americas during the 1980s. The group regularly performed at venues such as New Morning in Paris, SOB's in New York City, and Maroni Palace in Saint-Laurent, French Guiana. They also became popular in Martinique and Guadeloupe, where Kassav' was helping make zouk a major French Caribbean music style.

=== 1989–2019: Peak years and later career ===
Dibala's album Super Soukous with the group made its American debut in 1989 with its release on Shanachie Records and brought together rhythm guitarist Mimi Kazidona, bassist Remy Salomon, Guadeloupean-born French zouk synthesizer player Ronald Rubinel, and percussion from Mabélé, Macaire, and Dibala. Mabélé led the vocals, while Dibala also sang with Baron and Cacharel, and guest vocalists included Kanda Bongo Man, Kichar Kilesa, and Victoire Balenda. Reviewing the album, music critic Robert Christgau said that even though Mabélé was the main vocalist, Dibala's guitar playing dominated the album, "piling signature riff on signature riff", while "his guitar lines and interludes lift and lyricize the boss's stripped-down Afrodisco". This was followed by the band's six-track album Explosion, for which Mabélé composed "Pardon" and "Douce Isabelle". Mabélé also released the six-track Soukouss La Terreur that year, while Dibala issued Mondo Ry with Loketo. The band also appeared on John Boxingo's self-titled five-track album John Boxingo. They performed several concerts across Africa and Europe—especially in Paris—before appearing at SOB's in New York City, which Afropop Worldwide called the "gateway for African groups seeking to tour in America". During this period, the fashion movement La Sape emerged alongside the kwassa kwassa in Paris. Stewart noted that its rise was fitting, as Zairean sapeurs were arriving in large numbers, with Paris providing easy access to the designs of Pierre Cardin, Yves Saint Laurent, Jean-Paul Gaultier, Giorgio Armani, and Gianni Versace. Kanda Bongo Man, with his tailored jumpsuits and trademark round-brimmed hat, epitomized the style, while several musicians also ventured into fashion design, including Mabélé, who created a leather outfit for a Loketo tour.

Loketo's 1991 album Extra Ball was co-arranged by Mabélé and Dibala, who also acted as its creative directors. Their collaboration ended soon afterward, with Mabélé continuing to lead Loketo and recruiting prominent soukous lead guitarist Dally Kimoko, with whom he achieved much of his success, while Dibala established Matchatcha alongside rhythm guitarist Freddy De Majunga, bassist Miguel Yamba, and singers Antoinette Yelessa and Joelle Esso. According to Radio France Internationale, their willingness to experiment musically allowed both acts to remain among the leading innovators of the period. Mabélé followed with the six-track King of Soukous, which was produced by Houetinou for Sound Wave Records and distributed by WEA Latina. The six-track Embargo, produced by Jimmy International Production and distributed by Mélodie Distribution, was Mabélé's successful album that year. It included lead guitarist Kimoko, rhythm guitarists Wabacha and Géo Bilongo, bassist Salomon, rock guitarist Olivier Marot, keyboardist Jean-Claude Bihary, drummers Macaire and Ty-Jan, and drum programmer Michel Lorentz. Embargo was supported by the hits "Betty", "Asta Di", "Mawa", "Liste Rouge", and "Un Seul Dieu". Although he toured Kenya and the United States during the early 1990s, Mabélé developed especially close ties with the Caribbean. Radio France Internationale pointed out that he propped the "transatlantic bridge" between the Congo and the Caribbean first established by Jean-Serge Essous of Les Bantous de la Capitale. During this period, Afro-Caribbean musical exchanges intensified, with zouk gaining a strong following in Africa while Loketo's choruses became popular in Fort-de-France and Pointe-à-Pitre.

In 1992, Mabélé returned with Stop, Arrêtez!, which he arranged himself and recorded with lead guitarists Kimoko and Popolipo, bassists Ngouma Lokito and Salomon, rhythm guitarists Wabacha and Rigo Star, drummers Awilo Longomba and Macaire, and keyboardist Ronald Rubinel. That same year, Loketo released the seven-track Choc A Distance, which included Mabélé's songs "Zenab" and "V.M." The album was produced by the Kenyan label Editions D'Ivoire and reissued in 1993 by Jimmy's International Production, which also released Mabélé's seven-track 1994 album Génération-Wachiwa Encaisse Tout, recorded with Loketo. The band returned to SOB's in May 1995 before releasing the 11-track Qui Dit Mieux? in 1996 and the nine-track Proteïne 4 in 1997. Mabélé wrote "Proteïne 4", "X 13 Bizarre", "Kole", "Danina", and "Mipepe", while co-writing "Yella" with Aristide Diabolla, "Paulo Kamba" with Victoria Brazza, and "Dit Yopi" and "Gina" with Eddy Diabolla. On 12 November 1998, he released the 10-track Tour De Controle, which featured the hit "Waka Waka". The next year, the Paris-based label Debs Music issued Compil Two, a compilation of his greatest hits that included "Loketo", "Vacances Aux Antilles", "Zebola", "Ebouka", and "Sans frontières".

Mabélé's next album, the 10-track Dossier X, followed on 30 May 2000. Co-produced by Jimmy's International Production and SonoDisc, it included guest appearances by Gilles Aimé, Nono Manzanza, and Quentin Duroy. On 23 June 2004, Debs Music issued Mabélé's 10-track Ça Va Ce Savoir?, which he co-arranged with Caien Madoka. After suffering a stroke and living with its aftereffects for five years, Mabélé reunited with Loketo for a series of successful concerts in the French West Indies between May and June 2009. His mini-album Elephants Ambiance was released in 2019.

== Illness and death ==
In 2005, Mabélé was diagnosed with persistent malignant throat cancer and later suffered a stroke. Following intensive treatment, which significantly affected his appearance, he recovered with the support of producer Jimmy Houetinou, as well as his family and friends. His condition remained a concern among fans, especially after he was moved to a specialized nursing facility in Île-de-France. While touring Kenya, fellow Congolese singer Nyboma informed audiences of Mabélé's illness and called on fans to pray for his recovery. During one of his performances, Nyboma honored him by performing one of Mabélé's songs.

Mabélé was admitted to a hospital in Eaubonne on 19 March 2020 and died that night after contracting COVID-19. His daughter Liza Monet announced his death on Twitter, while former Loketo member Mav Cacharel also shared the news on Facebook. However, Houetinou told BBC Afrique that Mabélé's death from coronavirus had not been officially confirmed and cited his longstanding health issues. After his death, musicians and fans paid tribute to him, including longtime Loketo lead guitarist Dally Kimoko, who remembered Mabélé after years of collaboration with the band following Diblo Dibala's departure. Claudy Siar, the presenter of Radio France Internationale's Couleurs Tropicales African music programme, also paid tribute to him.

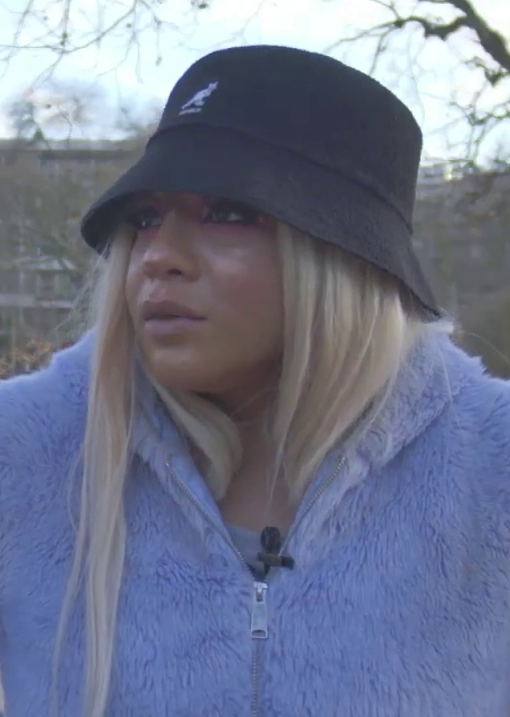
Liza Monet in 2020.

== Personal life ==
Mabélé was married to a woman from Réunion, and they had a daughter, French rapper Liza Monet, who was born on 12 April 1989 in Clamart, Hauts-de-Seine. According to the Nairobi-based media outlet Kenyapage, his wife, Liza, left him after his health deteriorated following a stroke that left him partially paralyzed.

== Discography ==
=== Solo ===
- 1982: Na La Vie (Totem Music)
- 1983: Nicoletta, Fille des Antilles (Afro Rythmes)
- 1986: Africa Mousso (Femme D'Afrique) (Jimmy's International Production)
- 1986: Soukouss La Terreur (Jimmy's International Production)
- 1991: King of Soukous (Sound Wave Records)
- 1991: Embargo (Jimmy International Production)
- 1992: Stop, Arrêtez! (Jimmy International Production)
- 1994: Génération-Wachiwa Encaisse Tout (Jimmy International Production)
- 1998: Tour De Controle (Jimmy International Production)
- 2000: Dossier X (Jimmy's International Production)
- 2004: Ça Va Ce Savoir? (Debs Music)
- 2019: Elephants Ambiance (Jimmy's International Production)
