= Samba Mapangala =

Congolese singer and bandleader

- Born: Matadi
- Occupations: Musician

Samba Mapangala is a Congolese singer and bandleader who has spent most of his five-decade musical career in Kenya, where he notably created and led Virunga, which has been one of the most popular bands in East Africa for more than 35 years.

He was born in Matadi, in the Democratic Republic of Congo. He moved to Kinshasa, where he finished secondary school, in the early 1970s (or in 1977 according to one source, but that year is contradicted by other information in the same and other sources). After finishing school he was a member of several 1970s Kinshasa bands: he sang with Super Tukina who recorded his first hit, "Satonge," then he joined Super Bella Bella alongside Jean Bosco and Mongoley, a guitarist formerly of Orchestre Lipua Lipua, and he also played with Bariza and Saka Saka.

Mapangala moved to Uganda in 1975 where he and some other Congolese musicians formed the Les Kinois band. They moved to Nairobi in 1977. He then joined Super Mazembe, where he could participate in composing songs like 'Shida'and 'Samba'.Later, he formed a new band, the Orchestra Virunga, in 1981. The band is named after Virunga volcano located in Congo.

Orchestra Virunga released their first album, It's Disco Time with Samba Mapangala in 1982. In the early 1990s the group gained some international popularity through album releases like Virunga Volcano and Feet on Fire.

He has continued to record, and is still one of the leading musicians in East Africa. He is now based in the United States. Mapangala began performing with the Occidental Brothers Dance Band International in the fall of 2009.

Mapangala is considered one of the golden era of Kenyan Lingala music acts alongside Les Mangelepa, Baba Gaston and Super Mazembe.

At the 2004 Tanzania Music Awards, his album Ujumbe was nominated in the best African Album category.

== Discography ==
Albums

- It's Disco Time with Samba Mapangala (1982)
- Mabiala (1983)
- Evasion, vol. 2 (1983)
- Malako (1984) [re-release of "Disco Time"]
- Safari (1988) (Kenyan cassette)
- Vunja Mifupa (1989) (CBS Kenya IVA 071, cassette)
- Paris-Nairobi (1990) (European cassette)
- Virunga Volcano 1990 (Earthworks, CD) [re-release of "Malako"/"Disco Time" / plus 2 songs]
- Feet On Fire (1990 or 1991)(Stern's Africa STCD 1036, CD)
- Karibu Kenya (1995) (Sun Music, CD)
- Vunja Mifupa (1997) (Lusam 01, CD)
- Song and Dance (2006"]
- Ujumbe (2001) (Stern's / Earthworks STEW43CD)
- Virunga Roots Volume 1 (2004) (Samba Mapangala)
- Virunga or Samba Mapangala In Paris (?) [Kenyan cassette, 4 songs from "Virunga Roots Volume 1"]
- Song and Dance (2006) (Virunga Records)
- African Classics: Samba Mapangala & Virunga (2008) (Sheer Sound)
- Live on Tour (2009)
- Maisha Ni Matamu (Life Is Sweet) (2011)

Contributing artist

- The Rough Guide to the Music of Kenya and Tanzania (1996) (World Music Network)

== Relevant literature ==
- Rosenberg, Aaron L. "Making the case for popular songs in East Africa: Samba Mapangala and Shaaban Robert." Research in African Literatures (2008): 99-120.
