= Orchestra Makassy =

East African soukous band

Orchestra Makassy were an East African soukous band of the late 1970s and early 1980s, consisting of musicians from Uganda and Zaire (now the Democratic Republic of the Congo).

== About ==
In 1975, under the leadership of their principal vocalist Kitenzogu "Mzee" Makassy, the group moved from Kampala, Uganda to Dar es Salaam, Tanzania, taking up residence at the New Africa Hotel where they were joined by guitarists and singers such as Mose Se Sengo ('Fan Fan') and Remmy Ongala. One of the band's first recordings was the song "Chama Cha Mapinduzi" praising the Tanzanian independence party, with lyrics based on the words of the country's first president, Julius Nyerere. In 1982, the band moved to Nairobi, Kenya, to record The Nairobi AGWAYA Sessions at the CBS Nairobi studio. Remmy Ongala left the band and stayed in Tanzania where he went on to join Orchestra Super Matimila. Mose Se Sengo left the band in Kenya to start his own band Somo Somo. The Nairobi Agwaya Sessions, produced by London-based Australian engineer, Norman Mighell, has been described as "one of the finest moments of East African rumba" and was mixed at Basing Street Studios, assistant engineer, Cliff Lewis.

The band broke up in 1984.

== Partial discography ==
- The Radio Tanzanian Sessions (1980)
- The Nairobi Agwaya Sessions (Virgin 1982) - reissued in 2005 under the title Legends of East Africa - Orchestra Makassy
- The Greatest Hits Of Makassy
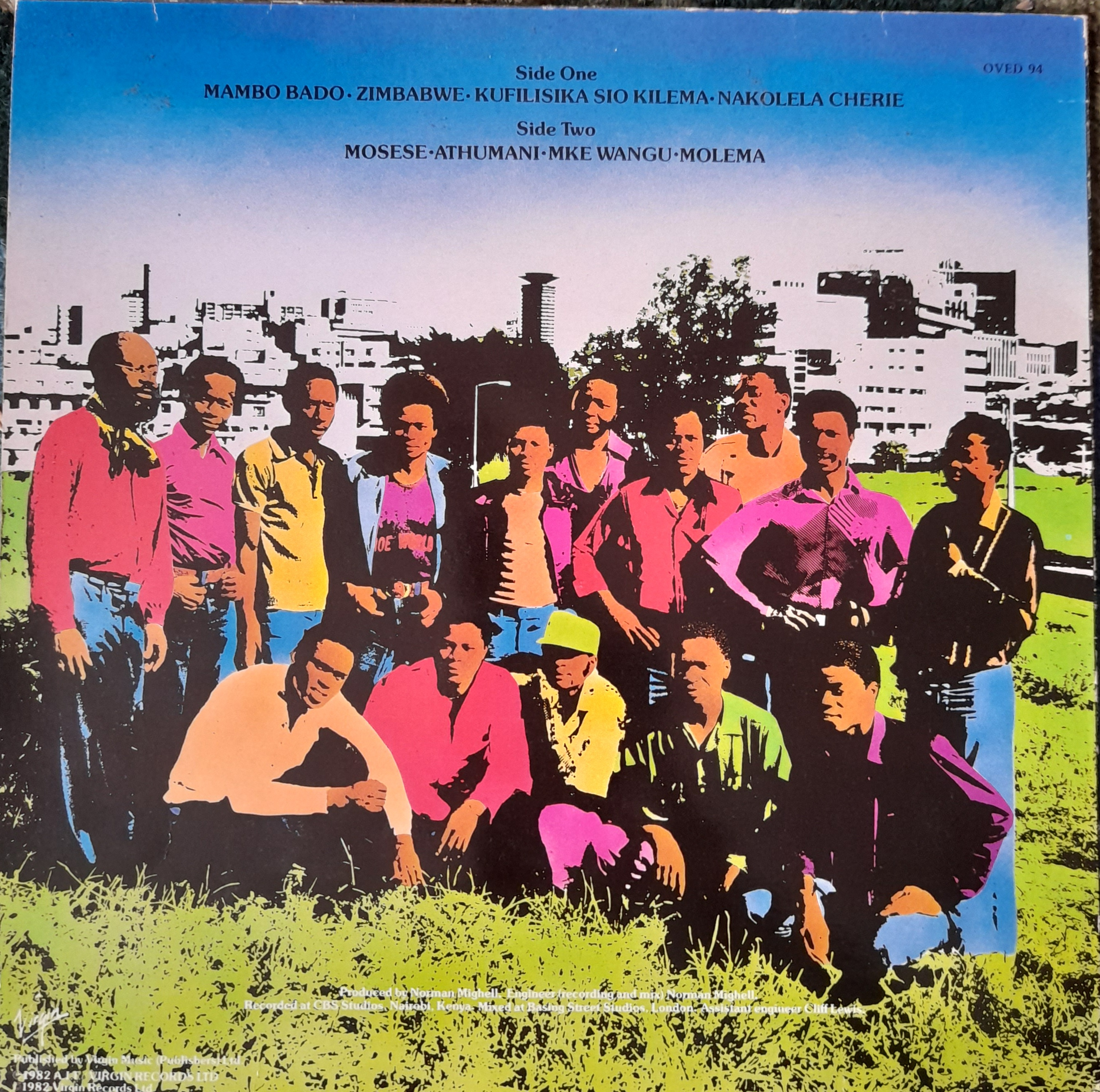
  reverse image of band members
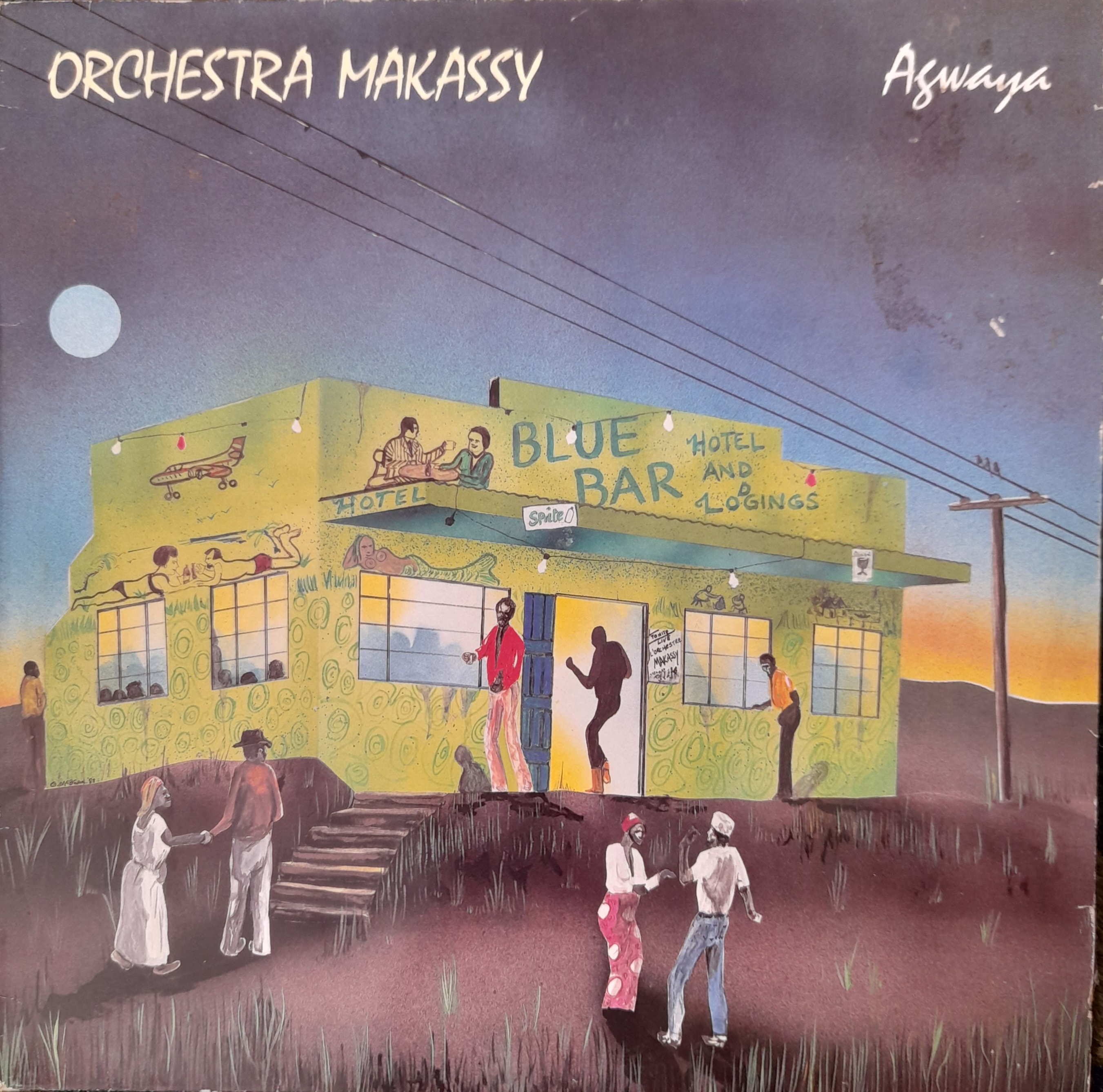
  Agwaya album cover
