= Les Mangelepa =

Musical band

Les Mangelepa is a musical group from Kenya. It is considered as one of the golden era of Kenyan Lingala music acts alongside Super Mazembe, Baba Gaston and Samba Mapangala.

The group was formed in 1976 as a splinter of Baba Gaston’s Baba National. Its original bandleader was Bwamy Walumona (Le Capitaine). The group was at the height of its popularity in the '70s and '80s with hits like Embakasi, Maindusa, Walter, Safari ya Mangelepa, Odesia, Dracula and Maboko Pamba. Bwammy Walumona left Les Mangelepa in 1986 after becoming a born again Christian. The band has since confronted further splits and line-up changes. The group was still performing as of 2011, led by Kabila Kabanze Evany.

A review of their 2018 CD, Last Band Standing, says "Their weekly residency at Club Vibro, playing a typical 10 p.m. to 6 a.m. gig, is quite a feat of endurance for the 70 year olds but conducive to sharpening their tunes to pinpoint focus."
