= Diblo Dibala =

Congolese musician (born 1954)

- Born: 9 August 1954 (age 72); Kisangani, Zaire
- Genre: Soukous
- Occupations: Musician, Songwriter
- Instruments: Guitar, Vocals
- Years active: 1979–present

Diblo Dibala (born 9 August 1954), often known simply as Diblo, is a Congolese soukous musician, known as "Machine Gun" for his speed and skill on the guitar.

== Life and career ==
He was born in 1954 in Kisangani. He moved to Kinshasa as a child, and aged 15 won a talent competition which led to him playing guitar in Franco's TPOK band. Dibala remained with the group for only a short period, going on to play with Vox Africa, Orchestra Bella Mambo and Bella Bella, in which band he first played with Kanda Bongo Man.

In 1979, he moved to Brussels, and in 1981 he joined Kanda Bongo Man's band in Paris. Their first album, Iyole (1981), was a success. Diblo became a sought after session guitarist, working with Pepe Kalle and many other soukous musicians.

In the mid-1980s, he formed his own band, Loketo (meaning 'hips'), with singers Aurlus Mabele and Mav Cacharel. He left the band in 1990 and formed a new group, Matchatcha, which is still active after a number of personnel changes.
