= Soukous =

African music genre

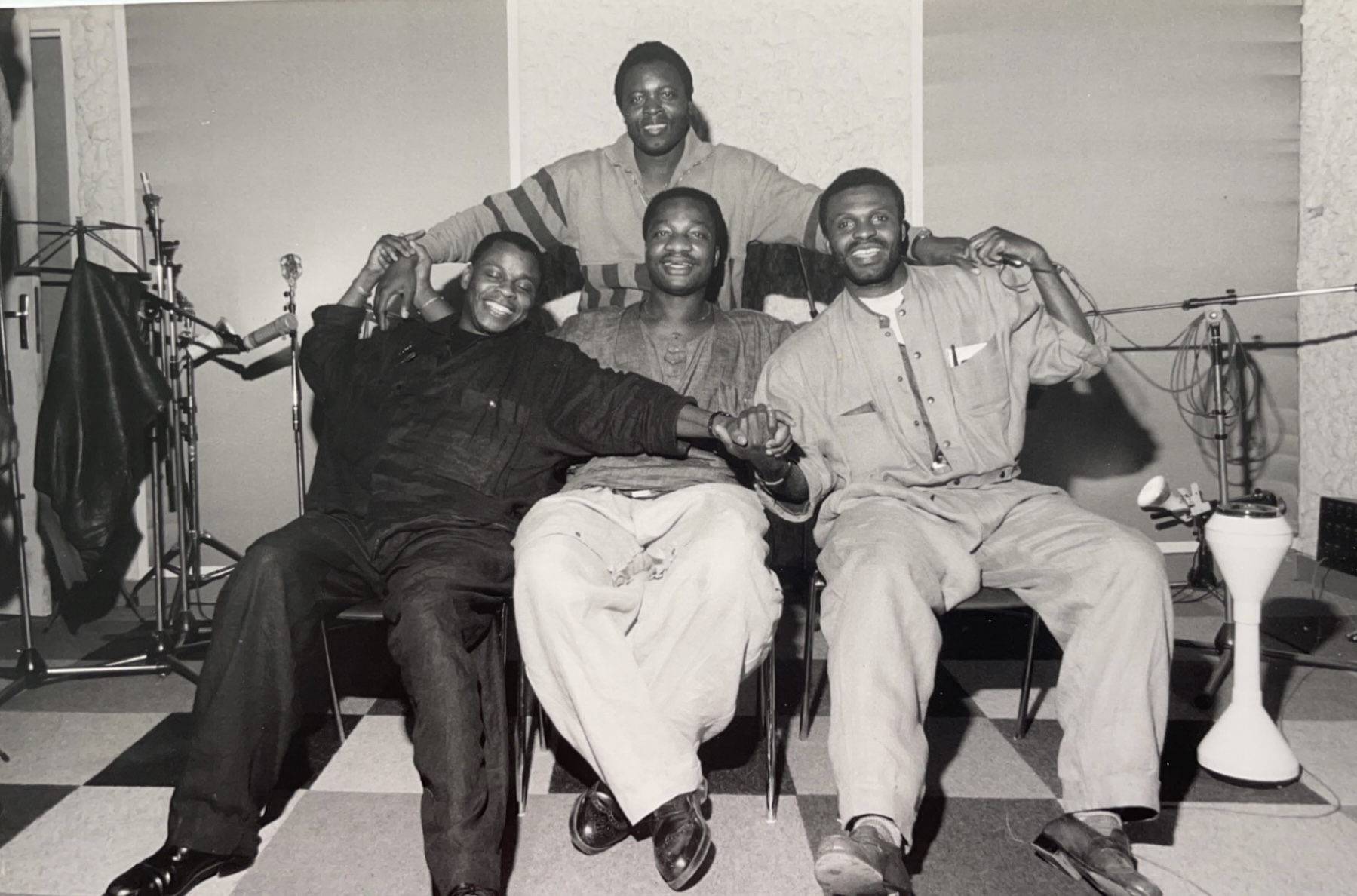
- Congolese band Loketo (left to right: Jean Baron, Aurlus Mabélé, Mav Cacharel; standing: Diblo Dibala) recording a studio album in 1985.
- Stylistic origins: Congolese rumba
- Cultural origins: 1966 in the Republic of the Congo and the Democratic Republic of the Congo; the 1980s in France.
- Derivative forms: Muziki wa dansi and ndombolo

Regional scenes
- Congolese sound (Kenya, Uganda, Tanzania), fast-paced soukous (Paris)

Other topics
- Soukous musicians

Soukous (from French secousse, "shock, jolt, jerk") is a genre of dance music originating from the Democratic Republic of the Congo (formerly Zaire) and the Republic of the Congo (formerly French Congo and the People's Republic of the Congo). It derived from Congolese rumba in the 1960s, with faster dance rhythms and bright, intricate guitar improvisation, and gained popularity in the 1980s in France. Although often used by journalists as a synonym for Congolese rumba, both the music and dance associated with soukous differ from more traditional rumba, especially in its higher tempo, song structures and longer dance sequences.

Soukous fuses traditional Congolese rhythms with contemporary instruments. It customarily incorporates electric guitars, double bass, congas, clips, and brass/woodwinds. Soukous lyrics often explore themes of love, social commentary, philosophical musing, struggle, and success. Singers occasionally performed in Lingala, Kikongo, French and Swahili and bands often consist of a primary vocalist accompanied by several backing singers.

== Etymology ==
The term soukous, derived from the French verb secouer, denoting "to shake," initially described a person who moved jerkily but evolved into a dance style synonymous with vitality and cadence. Over time, secousse evolved into soucousses and later soucous in everyday speech and in the press, before the letter "c" was eventually replaced with a "k", giving rise to the modern spelling soukous.

== Characteristics ==
The music typically utilizes a 12/8 time signature and major chords articulated in arpeggiated forms. Soukous lead guitarists are known for their speed, precision, and nimble fingerwork, and often navigate the higher registers of the fretboard. The bassline, inspired by hand-drum percussion patterns, is the genre's rhythmic foundation and is typically characterized by a 16th-note cadence. Emerging prominently during Mobutu Sese Seko's reign in Zaire, the assertive bass style of soukous emulated regimented motions of military marches (marche militaire). This distinctive bass approach involves toggling between lower and higher registers, achieved through a plucking method that employs both the thumb (p) and index finger (i).

Tonally, soukous is shaped by specific configurations in the bass, midrange, and treble frequencies. The bass is generally accentuated by +3 dB to yield a deep, full-bodied low-end that supports the groove. The midrange, especially around the 700 Hz frequency, is often left flat or enhanced by as much as +6 dB. Meanwhile, the treble frequencies are either left flat or attenuated slightly by -3 dB.

In Matonge, the rhythmic guitar typically accompanies mid-tempo vocal passages, with the bass and bass drums accentuating the dominant beats, while guitarists emphasize the offbeats (one and two and three and four and). During vocal performances, the lead guitarist lays down a groove that underpins harmonized call-and-response singing, often intensified by an echo effect, producing an auditory experience sometimes described as a hypnotic auditory experience.

The percussion section is characterized by an unyielding, fast-paced beat, most commonly referred to as cavacha, with the drummer taking the lead in signaling shifts for the guitarists to match the lead player's transitions. Soukous chord progressions mainly rely on the I, IV, and V chords. Common progressions include:

1. I - I - IV - IV
2. I - IV - V
3. I -I - V-V
4. I - IV/V
5. V/IV - I
6. I/IV - IV/I
7. I - V- I - V
8. V/IV - I

== History ==
=== Origins ===
The origins of the genre can be traced back to Congolese rumba, which developed in the early 20th century when people in the French Congo and the Belgian Congo began blending intertribal Kongolese maringa dance music around Pool Malebo.

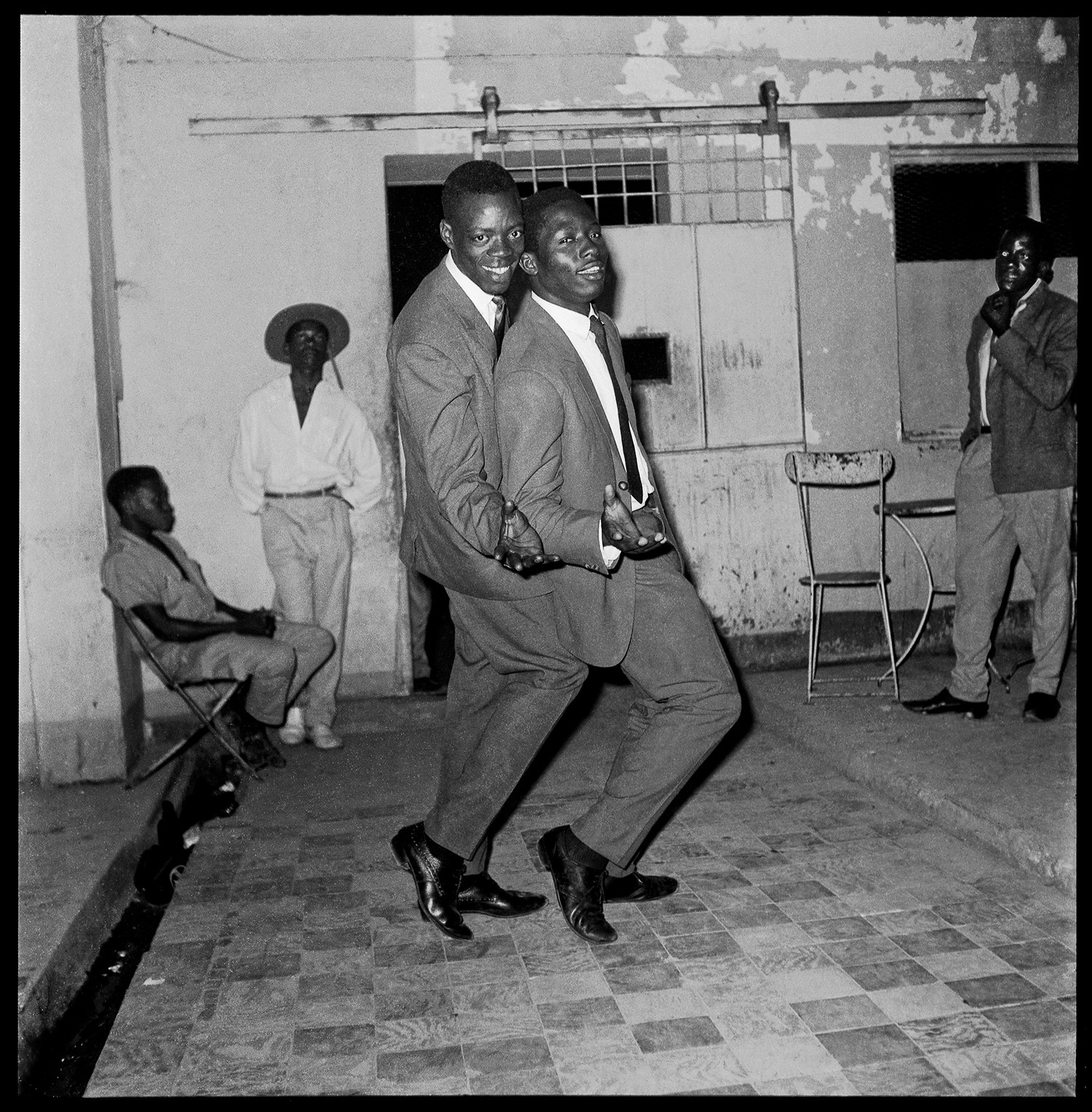
A duo performing at Congolese rumba nightspot in Léopoldville

During World War I, new styles of music and dance spread across the Lower Congo region (now Kongo Central) and the Pool Malebo area. These dances developed in labor camps and were also connected to workers returning from the construction of the Matadi–Kinshasa Railway. Local dances such as agbaya and maringa became popular, though the circular agbaya dance was gradually replaced by partnered maringa dancing, which spread widely in Matadi, Boma, Brazzaville, and Léopoldville (now Kinshasa). Early maringa bands used the likembe for melody, a bottle struck with metal rods for rhythm, and a small skin-covered frame drum called patenge for counter-rhythms. By the 1920s, however, accordions and acoustic guitars increasingly replaced the likembe as the main melody instruments. Maringa dancing, known for its hip movements and shifting body weight between the legs, became highly popular. By 1935, partnered dancing had spread throughout much of the Congo basin, including remote villages. Dance halls appeared in towns and villages, although traditional dancing continued in palm-branch huts.

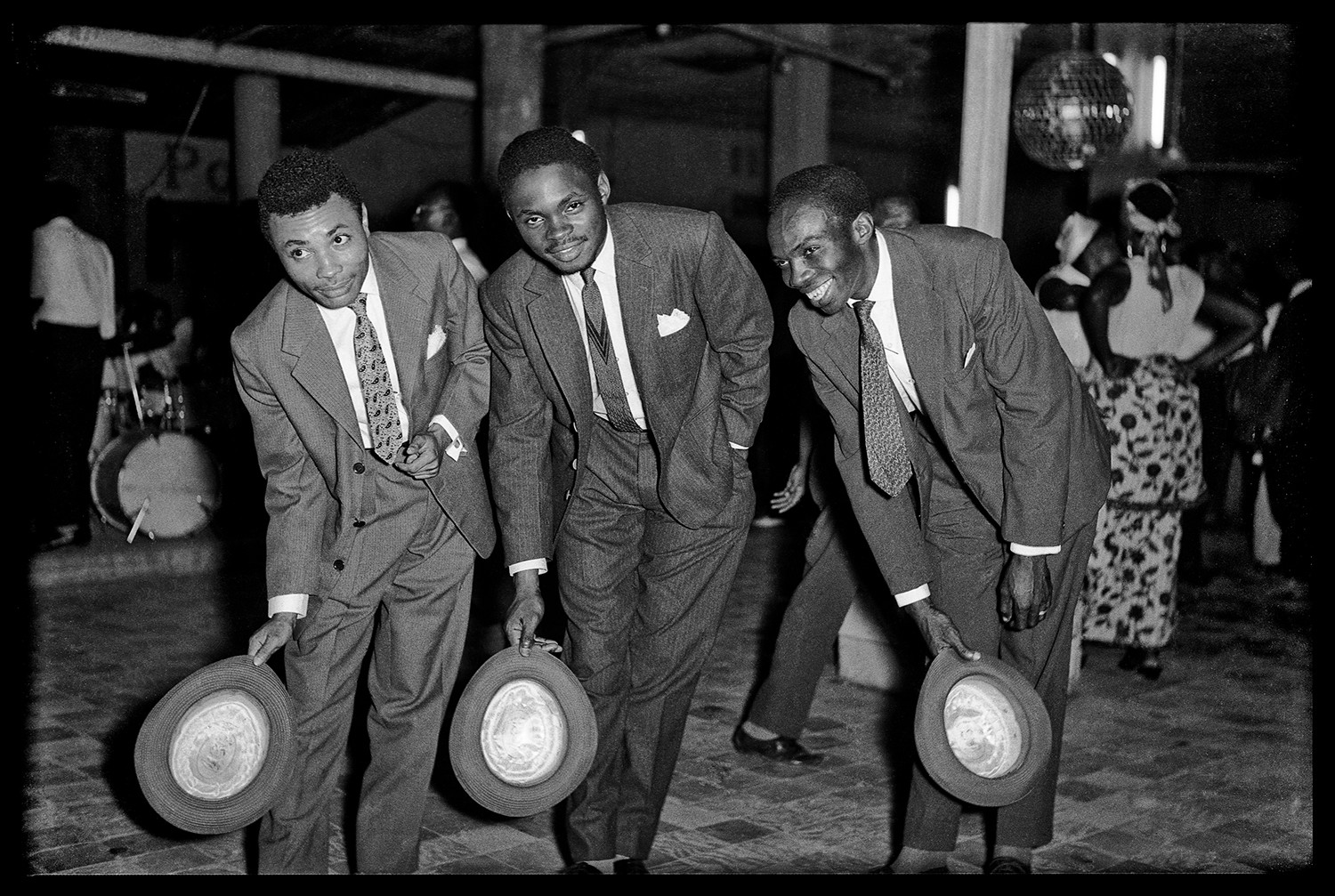
Congolese rumba bar in Léopoldville

In the early 1940s, Pool Malebo increasingly became a cultural link between Brazzaville and Kinshasa rather than a barrier between the two cities. Cuban son groups such as Sexteto Habanero, Trio Matamoros, and Los Guaracheros de Oriente were broadcast on Radio Congo Belge and became popular across the country. Although maringa music was not directly related to Cuban rumba, it gradually became known as "rumba Congolaise" because imported records by Cuban groups were often mistakenly labeled as "rumba". Ethnomusicology professor Kazadi wa Mukuna explained that the name remained popular partly because recording companies reused the term "rumba" while adapting it to local maringa rhythms. The music consequently became known as "Congolese rumba" or "African rumba". Antoine Wendo Kolosoy later became one of the first major stars of Congolese rumba. His 1948 song "Marie-Louise", co-written with guitarist Henri Bowane, became popular across Sub-Saharan Africa. Early pioneers of the genre helped establish Congolese rumba by developing new ways of playing and arranging their instruments.

=== Formation and paternity debate ===
During the early 1960s, many young Congolese musicians began speeding up the slower tempo of Congolese rumba. Artists introduced faster rhythms and placed greater emphasis on guitar improvisation, especially high-pitched and rapid lead guitar lines imbued with a more heightened African motif. Drummers shifted the clave rhythm to the snare drum, and lead guitars became the central focus of the music.

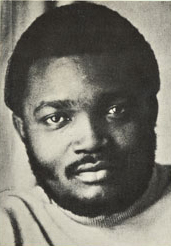
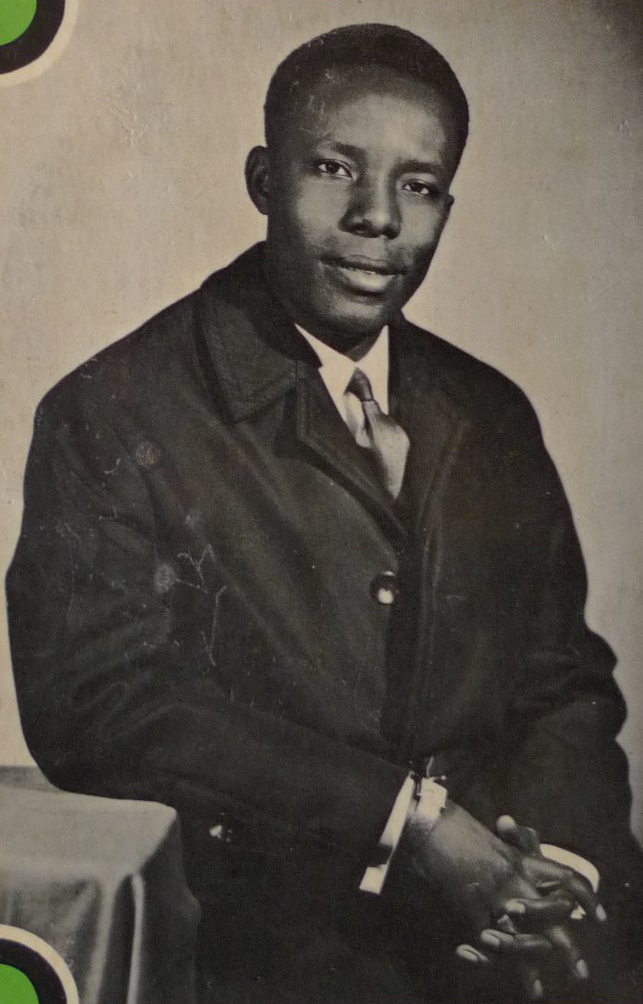
Franco Luambo (left) and Nico Kasanda (right)

The origins of soukous are a matter of dispute, with divergent attributions and viewpoints. Clément Ossinondé, a Congolese musicologist specializing in Congolese music, credits Franco Luambo and TPOK Jazz with helping pioneer the style through Franco's fast-paced rumba odemba rhythm. American music journalist Morgan Greenstreet similarly argued that Franco transformed the sebene, which had previously served mainly as a short instrumental bridge between vocal sections, into the central element of Congolese popular music. Franco's odemba style was described as "rougher, more repetitive, and rooted in rhythms that moved the hips of dancers at Kinshasa's hottest clubs". Many musicologists place the origins of soukous in Brazzaville instead of Kinshasa. British music historian Gary Stewart and Ossinondé credit guitarist Jacques Kimbembe and the formation of the Super Band in 1964, later renamed Orchestre Sinza Kotoko, with introducing the soukous style to Brazzaville nightlife around 1966. The group gradually replaced the older boucher style made popular by Les Bantous de la Capitale. Congolese music journalist Audifax Bemba explained that Orchestre Sinza stood out because of its conversational style of singing, expressive lead guitar work that expanded the sebene, and lively 4/4 rhythm. Kimbembe's guitar style also differed from earlier approaches by doubling notes in eighths rather than following the traditional quarter-note pattern. The band also introduced freestyle dance sections that encouraged energetic audience participation. According to popular stories, their performances were so lively that audiences often began dancing before even entering the venue.

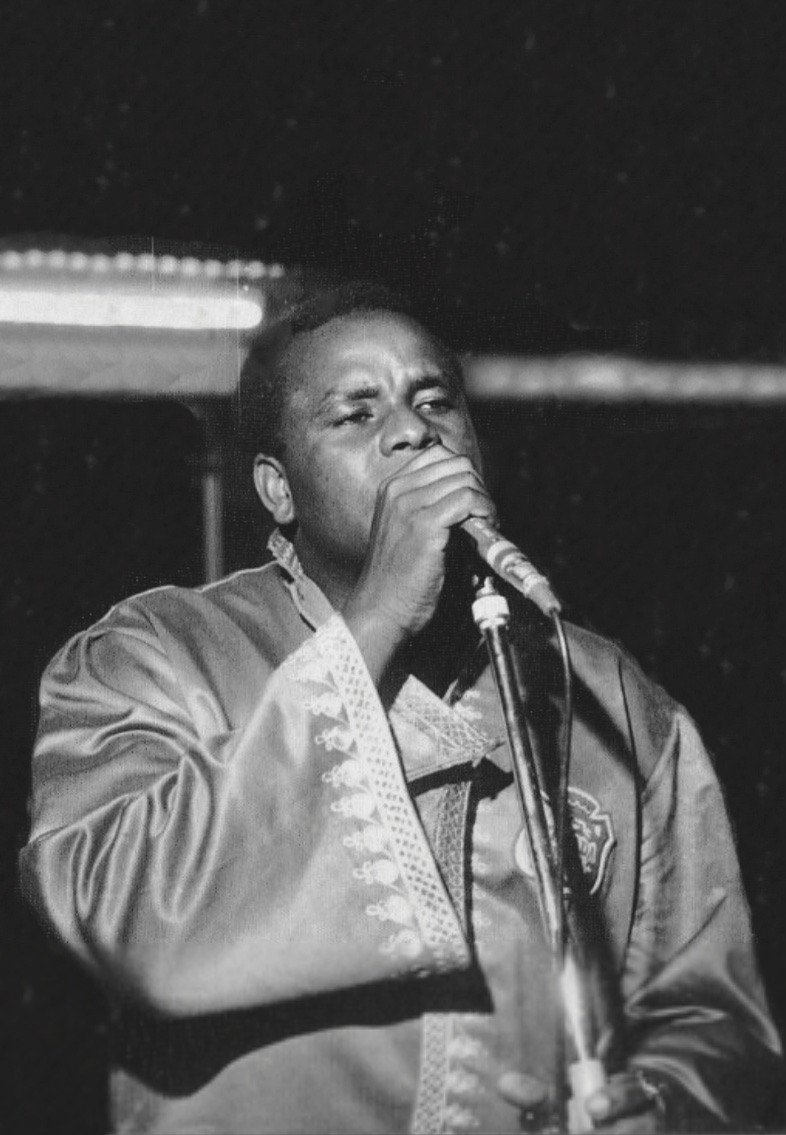
Pamelo Mounk'a at the Brazzaville fair in 1973.

During the late 1960s, Congolese musicians, much like Western artists experimenting with dances such as the twist and the stroll, created a series of new dance styles in order to remain competitive and attract younger audiences. In 1968, Orchestre Sinza Kotoko innovated the genre further with a variation known as mossaka. The band's popularity increased significantly after singer Pierre Moutouari joined them, which led to their first tour in Paris and a recording contract with the French label Pathé Marconi. Around the same period, Docteur Nico introduced kiri-kiri, a dance style partly influenced by the Western jerk dance. Kiri-kiri songs generally followed the standard structure of Congolese rumba before moving into the sebene section, where dancers could perform new dance steps. Docteur Nico's 1968 composition "Kiri-Kiri Mabina Ya Sika" ("kiri-kiri, the new dance"), recorded with Fiesta Sukisa, became the defining anthem of the style. Other groups soon experimented with similar innovations. Les Bantous de la Capitale experimented with hybrids, such as Pamelo Mounk'a's "Masuwa", which was billed as soukous-kiri-kiri. Tabu Ley Rochereau also introduced a dance style known as the jobs, which he described as a blend of the jerk and Congolese rumba. His 1968 song "Martin Luther King", which he dedicated to the assassinated American civil rights leader, exemplified this style. The song stood out for its references to international figures such as Johnny Hallyday and Mao Zedong, its eight-minute length, and its use of a Western-style drum kit, which reflected the gradual obsolescence of older percussion instruments such as maracas. This period saw a proliferation of new dance styles rooted in Congolese rumba, including Jeannot Bombenga's mambenga, Le Grand Kallé's yéké yéké (described as the "eighth phase of the rumba"), and others such as Apollo 11. Reflecting on the rapid musical changes of the period, Docteur Nico later stated, "We invent a new dance style every day". Despite this stylistic diversification, Congolese rumba remained the main foundation of the genre.

During this epoch, the dominant bands in Congolese music included TPOK Jazz, African Fiesta National, African Fiesta Sukisa, and Les Bantous de la Capitale, followed closely by Négro Succès, Conga Succès, and Cobantou. Orchestre Sinza simultaneously emerged as a second-tier orchestra in Congo-Brazzaville that nonetheless became the top-selling African act in the Pathé Marconi catalog from 1969 to 1974. Their innovations played a crucial role in shaping the so-called "third school" of Congolese music, most notably influencing the band Zaïko Langa Langa. In 1974, Zaïko Langa Langa adopted many of Orchestre Sinza's stylistic features, such as a brisk 4/4 tempo, eighth-note doubling in the sebene, free-form dance, and celebratory rhythms. The sebene in Zaïko Langa Langa's "Éluzam", often cited as the "birth certificate" of the third school, mirrored the sebene from Orchestre Sinza's 1969 track "Vévé".

=== 1960s–1980s: International popularity ===
==== Europe and the United States ====
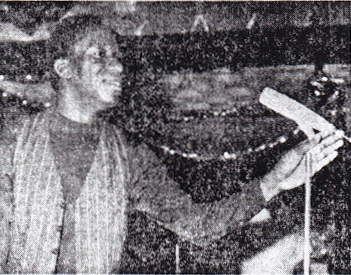
Tabu Ley Rochereau performing at the Paris Olympia in 1970

In the late 1960s and early 1970s, soukous became a predominant popular African dance style across Africa and into the continent's diaspora in Belgium, France, the UK, and the United States. During this period, a surge of Zairean musicians moved to Belgium and France, primarily driven by the hegemony of the Mobutu Sese Seko regime, which propagated propaganda songs as part of the Authenticité campaign to foster a sense of national identity and pride through ideological slogans of the one-party state, the Movement Populaire de la Révolution (MPR). This state ideological shift gradually infiltrated Zairean popular music, with popular musicians embracing the regime's ideology and documenting its achievements. Mobutu's use of music as a political tool has often been compared to Mao Zedong's use of music during the Chinese Cultural Revolution. At the same time, Congolese urban music continued to spread internationally, leading many musicians to settle in African and European countries, particularly Belgium and France.

The soukous rapid growth also attracted many youths in Kinshasa who saw music as one of the few available career opportunities during a period of limited employment. Journalist Susan Orlean noted that by the mid-1970s, many African musicians were recording in studios in Paris and Brussels, even though France did not have stores dedicated entirely to African music. Records were often produced in Europe and then shipped back to Africa for sale and distribution. Nonetheless, the growing African diaspora in France, over a million people, mostly from Francophone nations including Gabon, Benin, Togo, Mali, Chad, Côte d'Ivoire, Senegal, and Zaire, provided a strong listener base. Soukous became known as a cosmopolitan and widely appreciated genre, with several Congolese artists helping introduce the style to major international stages. Tabu Ley Rochereau became the first African artist invited to perform at the Olympia Hall in Paris in December 1970, where he attracted few connoisseurs and set a precedent for subsequent Zairean musicians. Abeti Masikini followed suit, becoming the second Zairean and the first female soukous artist to perform there alongside Mireille Mathieu and Hugues Aufray. Masikini also performed at Carnegie Hall in New York on 11 March 1974. An expanding African nightlife scene developed in Paris, beginning with clubs such as Keur Samba near Place de la Concorde in 1975, followed by venues including Black and White Club, Atlantis, Timmy's, L'Alizé, and Au Petit Tam-Tam.

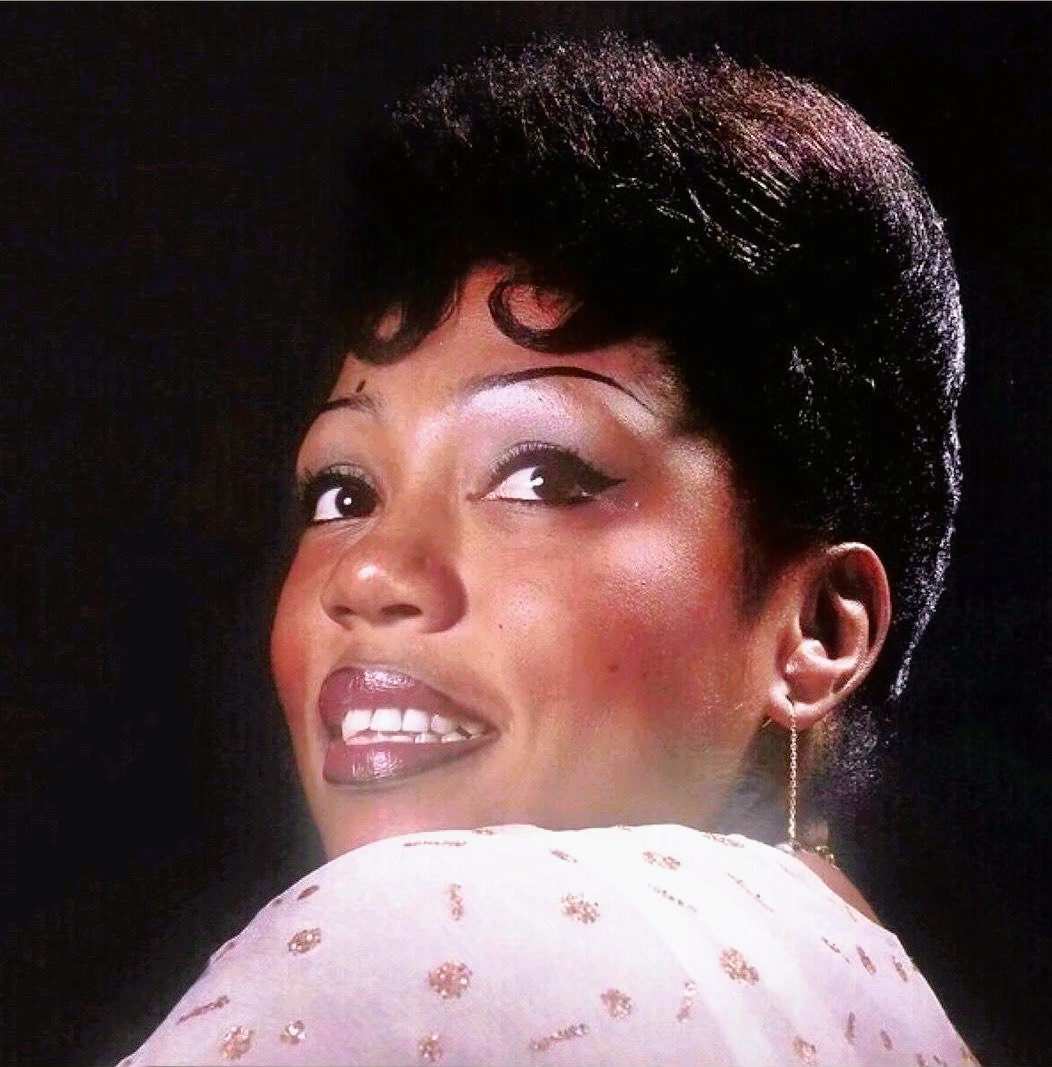
Abeti Masikini in 1978

At the same time, the orchestra M'Bamina ventured to Paris before seeking audiences in Italy in 1972. By the late 1970s, many leading Zairean musicians were touring Europe and increasingly choosing to remain abroad. Guitarist Pablo Lubadika Porthos arrived in Paris in 1979 with singer Sam Mangwana through Lomé, Togo, after recording under the name African All Stars. Mangwana, who had previously collaborated with many major Congolese musicians, had moved to Abidjan in 1976 in search of better opportunities and later formed a new band of Congolese economic exiles, who became regular performers in Paris studio sessions. African All Stars gained attention with their hit "Suzana Coulibaly", which premiered on 31 December 1979. The song featured "simple, repetitive rhythms" played at a faster tempo than rumba. Mangwana's exclamation "soukous sophistiqué" as Lokassa Ya M'Bongo and Rigo Star crafted a "rock-solid" sebene solidified the record's direction and initiated an independent musical movement targeting the international market. As their popularity increased, African All Stars adapted the faster and rougher styles developing among youth bands in Brazzaville and Kinshasa, and helped spread this sound internationally.

The genre gained moderate traction in the United States, though, as reported by the New York Times, mainstream American audiences since 1982 remained hesitant to fully embrace African popular music, favoring songs with English lyrics and "basic rhythms". Even so, several independent American record labels began licensing and reissuing African recordings, and by the early 1980s, U.S. tours and albums by artists such as Tabu Ley, the Flamingos of Ghana, Sweet Talks (Ghana), and Sonny Okosun began to appear. As exposure grew, American listeners developed a deeper appreciation for African pop, and record companies identified soukous, jùjú, and highlife as some of the most internationally marketable African dance genres. Journalist Jon Pareles of the New York Times described Zairean popular music as the closest thing to a pan-African sound, with its guitars producing "circular runs like audible grins". This wave brought two generations of Congolese musicians into the U.S. market, with Tabu Ley marking his American debut with the album Tabu Ley on Shanachie Records with a mixture of rumba and soukous, while Nyboma's 1981 hit "Doublé Doublé" and Bibi Den Tshibayi's The Best Ambiance were reissued in 1984 by Rounder Records.

Music consultant Tom Schnabel recalled that African groups appeared almost weekly at venues such as the Music Machine in West Los Angeles, the Hollywood Palace, the Greek Theatre, and the Alligator Lounge. Among the notable Congolese artists who performed in the U.S. were Mbilia Bel, Les Quatre Étoiles, Papa Wemba, and Tabu Ley. Los Angeles emerged as one of the main centers for African music on the American West Coast. KCRW's influential radio program The African Beat, co-hosted by C.C. Smith, Solomon Solo Egbuho, and Ade James, played an important role in promoting African artists and concerts. At a time when the Los Angeles Times regularly covered African music, the city developed a reputation as a leading destination for African musicians touring the U.S.

==== Africa ====
Across Africa, soukous became one of the most dominant dance music styles and strongly influenced the development of many forms of modern African popular music, including benga music, muziki wa dansi, Kidandali, Igbo highlife, palm-wine music, and taarab. In Kinshasa, its popularity also encouraged the creation of nearly 350 youth bands, which introduced new dance styles, rhythmic patterns, and musical trends.

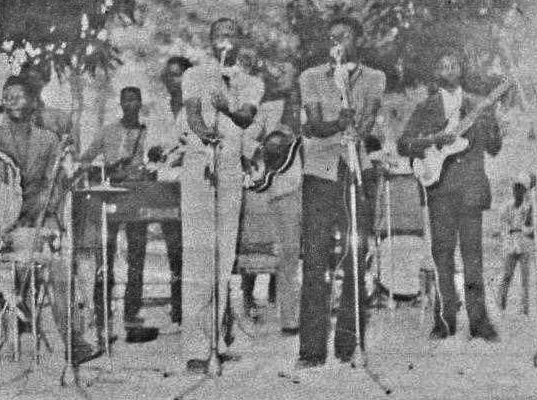
Zaïko Langa Langa performing in 1971. From left to right: Beaudoin Mitsho, Meridjo Belobi (behind), Enoch Zamuangana (behind), Teddy Sukami, Papa Wemba, Damien Ndebo (behind), Evoloko Jocker, Félix Manuaku Waku

As political and economic conditions in Zaire worsened during the 1970s, many musicians moved to countries such as Tanzania, Kenya, and Uganda, where bands supported themselves through record sales and regular live performances. By the early 1970s, several Zairean groups had already introduced the soukous rhythm into Kenyan nightclubs. The cavacha dance craze, which was popularized by groups such as Zaïko Langa Langa and Orchestra Shama Shama, spread rapidly across Central and East Africa and exert influence on Kenyan musicians. The cavacha drumming pattern, usually played on the snare drum or hi-hat, also became emblematic of the Zairean sound in Nairobi and was adopted by regional bands. Prominent Congolese rumba Swahili bands in Nairobi formed around Tanzanian bands like Simba Wanyika, which gave rise to offshoots like Les Wanyika and Super Wanyika Stars. Maroon Commandos, a Nairobi-based band, adopted soukous while combining it with its own local style. Japanese students living in Kenya, including Rio Nakagawa, became interested in the genre, and Nakagawa later formed Yoka Choc Nippon, a Japanese-conceived Congolese rumba band. Virgin Records also produced albums by the Tanzanian-Zairean group Orchestra Makassy and the Kenya-based Orchestra Super Mazembe. The Swahili-language hit song "Shauri Yako" ("it's your problem") became especially popular in Kenya, Tanzania, and Uganda.

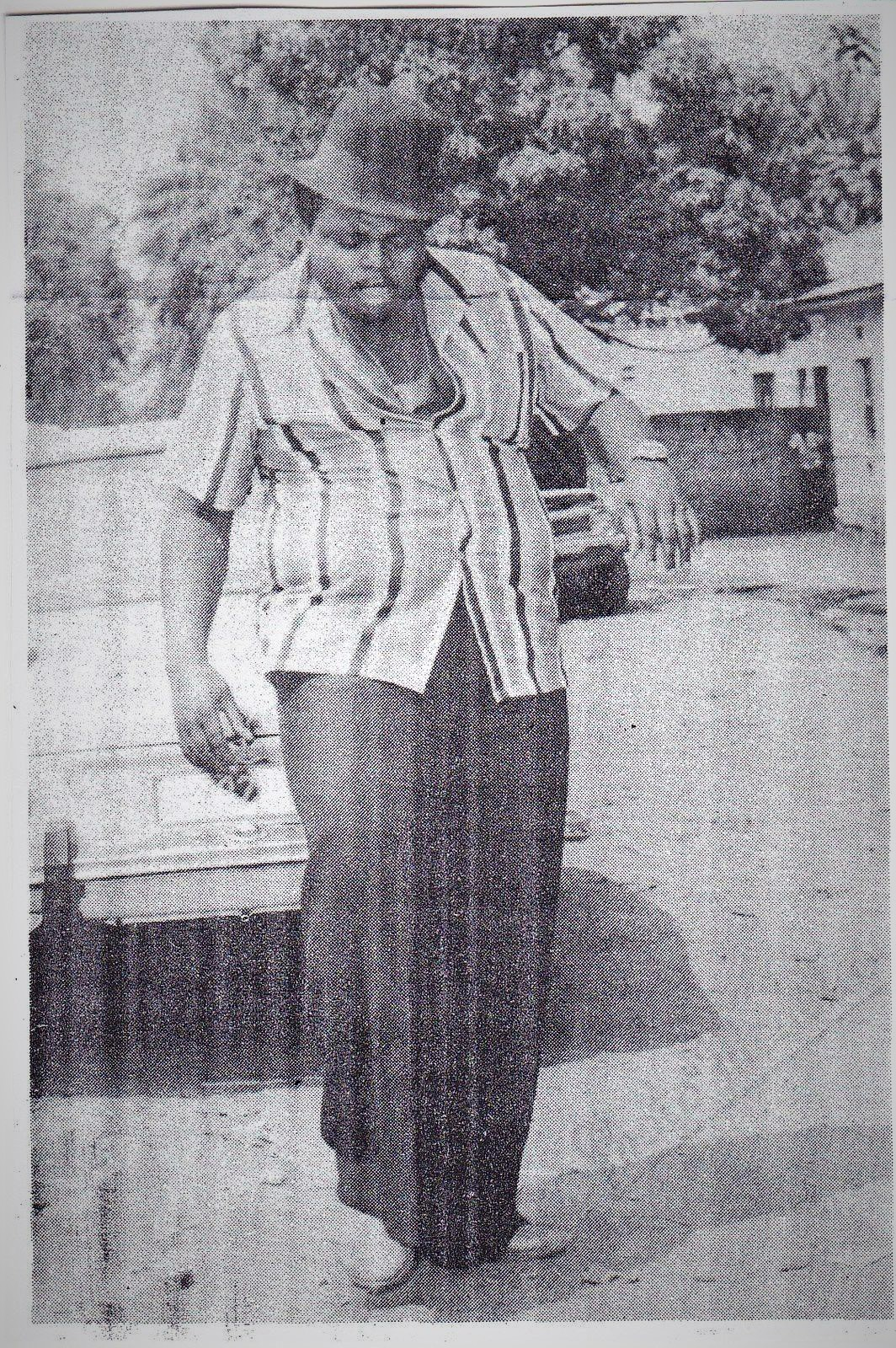
A posture of Pépé Kallé in 1978

Another influential Zairean band, Les Mangelepa, relocated to Kenya and achieved major success throughout East Africa. Zairean singer Samba Mapangala and his Nairobi-based Orchestra Virunga released the 1981 album Malako, which became one of the early releases associated with Europe's growing world music market. Soukous soon eclipsed East African styles like benga and taarab, emerging as the dominant form of urban entertainment and creating challenges for East African musicians who found it hard to rival its widespread success. Meanwhile, between 1976 and 1977, Sam Mangwana and the African All Stars dominated the dance halls of Kinshasa with records produced in West Africa, which were different from the sounds produced in the two-track studios of Kinshasa. Following this, there was a migration to Lomé and Cotonou, followed by Franco Luambo's departure to Belgium.

In Sierra Leone, soukous gained strong popularity among local musicians and diaspora musicians. One of the genre's foremost "purveyors" in the country was guitarist Abdul Tee-Jay, who became a leading artist in Sierra Leone's London-based music scene. He first learned guitar by listening to Congolese bands and recordings by Docteur Nico. In a 1989 interview with Folk Roots, Abdul Tee-Jay explained that his "Rokoto" style developed from adapting traditional Sierra Leonean folk melodies while also drawing influence from soukous and highlife. His 1992 album Fire Dombolo fused highlife, soukous, makossa, milo, and American jazz into a distinctive sound. His band Rokoto, whose name means "to dance" in Krio, evoked the sound of early 1980s Parisian productions by Richard Dick and Eddy Gustave, blending up-tempo reminiscent of Super Combo and Afro National, though less frenetic than the fast-paced TGV-style soukous of Loketo and Matchatcha.

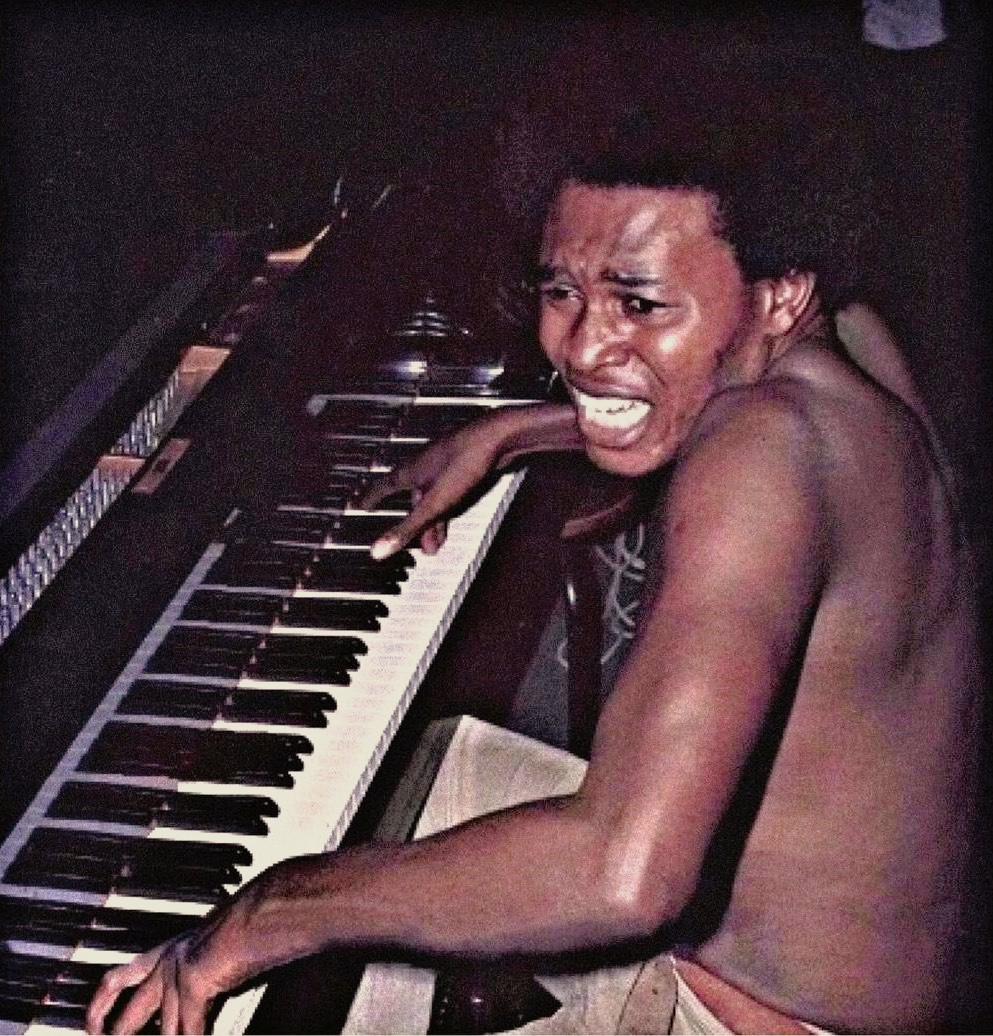
Gaby Lita Bembo playing piano in the 1970s

In Nigeria, soukous became widespread due to the transmission of Zairean music through Radio Brazzaville, where audiences were introduced to material from Zaire Vol. 6 (Soundpoint SOP 044, 1978). It catalyzed the emergence of a distinct genre of guitar-based Igbo highlife music, which was exemplified by musicians like Oliver De Coque, the Oriental Brothers International, and their various imitators and followers. The superabundance of Nigerian pressings of Zairean music featured the musicians who influenced this trend, as seen in the case of Music From Zaire Vol. 6, which showcased artists from Verckys Kiamuangana Mateta's stable like Orchestre Kiam, Orchestre Lipua-Lipua, and the cavacha rhythm. There was a prevalent inclination to exclude the slower "A" sides of various recordings and instead focus on the climactic sebene, the faster and more improvisational second half. This structural paradigm became emblematic of Igbo guitar highlife recordings epitomized by the music style of Oliver De Coque and Oriental Brothers International. Although often misidentified locally as Makossa, Congolese music was widely embraced in Nigeria. According to Vanguard entertainment editor Amadi Ogbonna, Igbo highlife was the dominant musical form prior to the Nigerian Civil War (1967–1970). After the conflict, many young men, including former members of the disbanded Biafran Armed Forces, turned to music for livelihood and emotional relief. These musicians, initially performing under pseudonyms and adopting Congolese styles, found popularity with audiences through energetic dance routines and infectious rhythms, particularly those of TPOK Jazz. One notable incident involved the defection of Chief Stephen Osita Osadebe's band members while on tour in London. Upon returning to Nigeria, they formed the Ikenga Super Stars of Africa, pioneering a new hybrid genre known as Ikwokirikwo. This style blended Igbo highlife with soukous, emphasized by elaborate guitar work and rhythmic swaying movements. The 1970s saw the rise of additional bands, such as the Oriental Brothers International, Peacocks Guitar Band International, Prince Nico Mbarga, and Rockfill Jazz, that also popularized this fusion. Although many artists continued to label their music as "highlife", it bore clear influence from Congolese rhythmic and structural elements. By the 1990s, the popularity of soukous in Nigeria had reached unprecedented heights. The Mail & Guardian, in an article published on 17 October 1997, reported that "Nigerian soukous" had become a staple of the country's musical programming. Soukous cassette tapes were widely circulated, particularly in southwestern Nigeria, and the genre was frequently heard on street cassette players and in public entertainment venues. Some Nigerian youths, enamored with the style, even began singing in French despite lacking comprehension of the language.

Soukous experienced widespread diffusion across southern Africa, where it was both adopted and adapted into various offshoots, such as Zimbabwe's immensely popular sungura genre.

==== South America, the Caribbean, and Réunion ====
In Colombia, soukous made inroads into the local culture and contributed to the development of champeta. In the third chapter of the documentary Pasos de la Cumbia, Lucas Silva, a DJ and cultural producer specializing in African music, recounts how Mobutu Sese Seko purchased a plane in Colombia. When it required maintenance, a Colombian mechanic traveled to Zaire, returning with a collection of 45 rpm records, including the iconic El Mambote by l'Orchestre Veve, which became a hit. Other 45 rpm records soon flooded Cartagena and Barranquilla.

In the article "Champeta is Liberation": The Indestructible Sound System Culture of Afro-Colombia, journalist April Clare Welsh observes, "When 'música Africana' swept the region during the '70s and '80s, sound systems were instrumental in forging a collective diasporic identity for Afro-Colombians in a society deeply divided by race and class". African musicians like Kanda Bongo Man, Nicolas Kasanda wa Mikalay, Diblo Dibala, Ikenga Super Stars of Africa, Mbilia Bel, and Mahlathini and the Mahotella Queens became local celebrities, forging a "pan-African connection that was, at the time, largely unknown to many Africans within the continent". Local musicians began replicating the arrangements of Congolese artists like Nicolas Kasanda wa Mikalay, Tabu Ley Rochereau, M'bilia Bel, Syran Mbenza, Lokassa Ya M'Bongo, Pépé Kallé, Rémy Sahlomon, and Kanda Bongo Man. Homegrown musicians such as Viviano Torres, Luis Towers, and Charles King became renowned for this. This movement led to the creation of champeta, a genre rooted in "soukous guitars, bass, drumming, and dance". Due to its overtly sensual dance moves and its association with the "Black Below", champeta was derided by the white upper classes. However, for Afro-Colombians, it was an assertion of their cultural identity and resilience. DJs often renamed African songs with Spanish titles, composed champetas in the Palenque language (a creole fusion of Spanish and Bantu languages such as Kikongo and Lingala), or phonetically distorted the original names. For instance, Mbilia Bel's "Mobali Na Ngai Wana" became known in Colombia as "La Bollona". Champeta emerged as a new marker of Black identity along Colombia's western coast and evolved from a peripheral genre to a mainstream national phenomenon. During the Super Bowl LIV halftime show on 2 February 2020, at Hard Rock Stadium in Miami Gardens, Florida, Shakira danced to Syran Mbenza's "Icha", a song colloquially referred to as "El Sebastián" in Colombia, which spawned the #ChampetaChallenge on social media platforms worldwide.

The genre also expanded its reach to the French overseas territories, notably Martinique, Guadeloupe, French Guiana, and Réunion, largely due to the extensive tours of Congolese artists. Among them, the band Loketo stood out as a "cultural ambassador" in helping introduce and popularize African music across these regions. Aurlus Mabélé was particularly influential, with his hits such as "Embargo", "Loketo", "Vacances aux Antilles", "Zebola", and "Waka Waka" becoming staples of local parties and dance floors. Jacob Desvarieux, guitarist and co-founder of Kassav', told Libération that his guitar style drew inspiration from Chuck Berry, Jimi Hendrix, and musicians from the Paris-based soukous scene, alongside rock artists. According to the Centre for Fine Arts, bands like Kassav' and Tabou Combo were key to transmitting cavacha drumming pattern to France, the French Antilles, and the broader Caribbean.

==== Paris scene ====
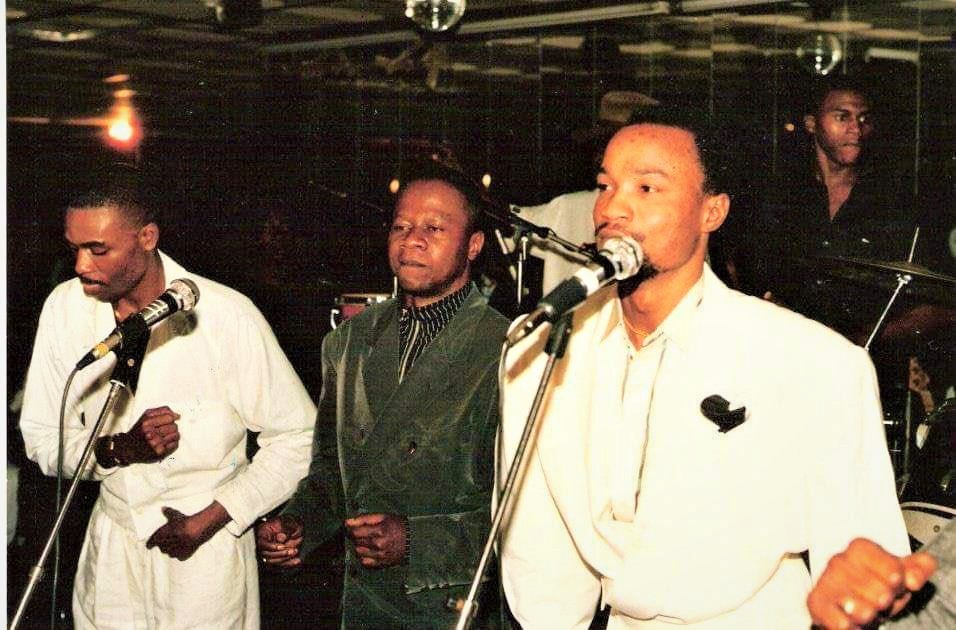
Koffi Olomidé and Papa Wemba, 1988

As sociopolitical unrest persisted in Zaire throughout the 1980s, numerous musicians sought refuge across Africa, with a considerable number relocating to Belgium, France, and the United Kingdom. Some traversed through Central and East Africa before ultimately establishing their operational bases in Europe. Soukous gained traction in Brussels, Paris, and London, emerging as the only sub-Saharan African genre universally embraced in Belgium and France. According to Congolese columnist Achille Ngoye, Belgium offered a significant permanent operational base for numerous Zairean artists. Orchestras such as Los Nickelos, Yéyé National, and Les Mongali, predominantly composed of students, garnered significant attention in Belgium. In July 1980, Franco Luambo consolidated his European influence by creating Visa 80, a Brussels-based distribution center for Zairean music, following his purchase of property in the city. Meanwhile, Dieudonné Kabongo, Dizzy Mandjeku, and Ntesa Dalienst rose to prominence due to the bankruptcy of Belgian record label Fonior!, which prompted many Zairean artists like Lita Bembo and Matima to seek reputable distribution entities in Belgium, while others found solace in performing in religious choirs, which frequently toured Holland.

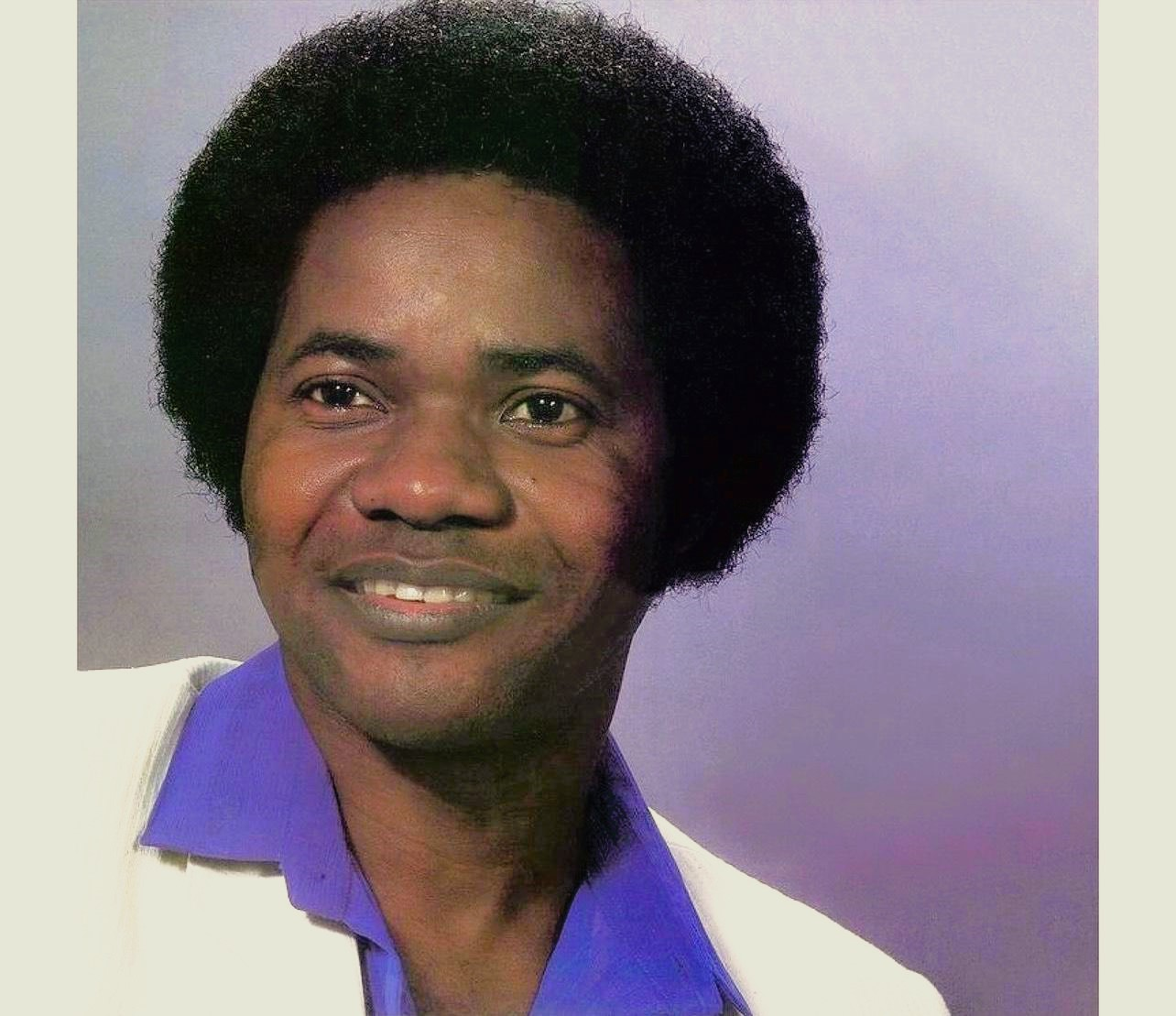
Nyboma in 1973

Soukous was chosen by Island Records producer Ben Mandelson and Togolese entrepreneur Richard Dick as the title of a 1982 compilation, Sound D'Afrique II: Soukous. The compilation included music from Mali and Cameroon alongside "Madeleina", a track from Pablo 'Porthos' Lubadika's 1981 album Ma Coco, which gained significant attention in Europe. Zaïko Langa Langa introduced the role of a dedicated hypeman, known as atalaku or animateur, into the ensemble of singers, setting a trend that almost every band on the Congolese music scene adopted, making atalakus emblematic of soukous as well as Congolese rumba. Zaïko Langa Langa achieved significant success, becoming the third generation of Congolese music as many founding members split off to form their own groups, which in turn splintered into more groups: Isife Lokole, Grand Zaïko Wa Wa, Langa Langa Stars, Clan Langa Langa, Choc Stars, and Anti-Choc among them. Papa Wemba and Viva La Musica made the longest-lasting impact, partly due to Wemba's ability to maintain a presence in both Paris and Kinshasa with dual bands, one focusing on soukous and another featuring French session players for international pop. In Parisian studios, the sebene guitars blended with the tight drum machines and synths of zouk and funky disco makossa on numerous records. However, this fusion received criticism for deviating from authentic Congolese styles. Notable critics like Nyboma argued that the music had become commercialized and lacked emotional depth, calling for a return to the fundamentals of "beautiful melodies and highly tuned voices".

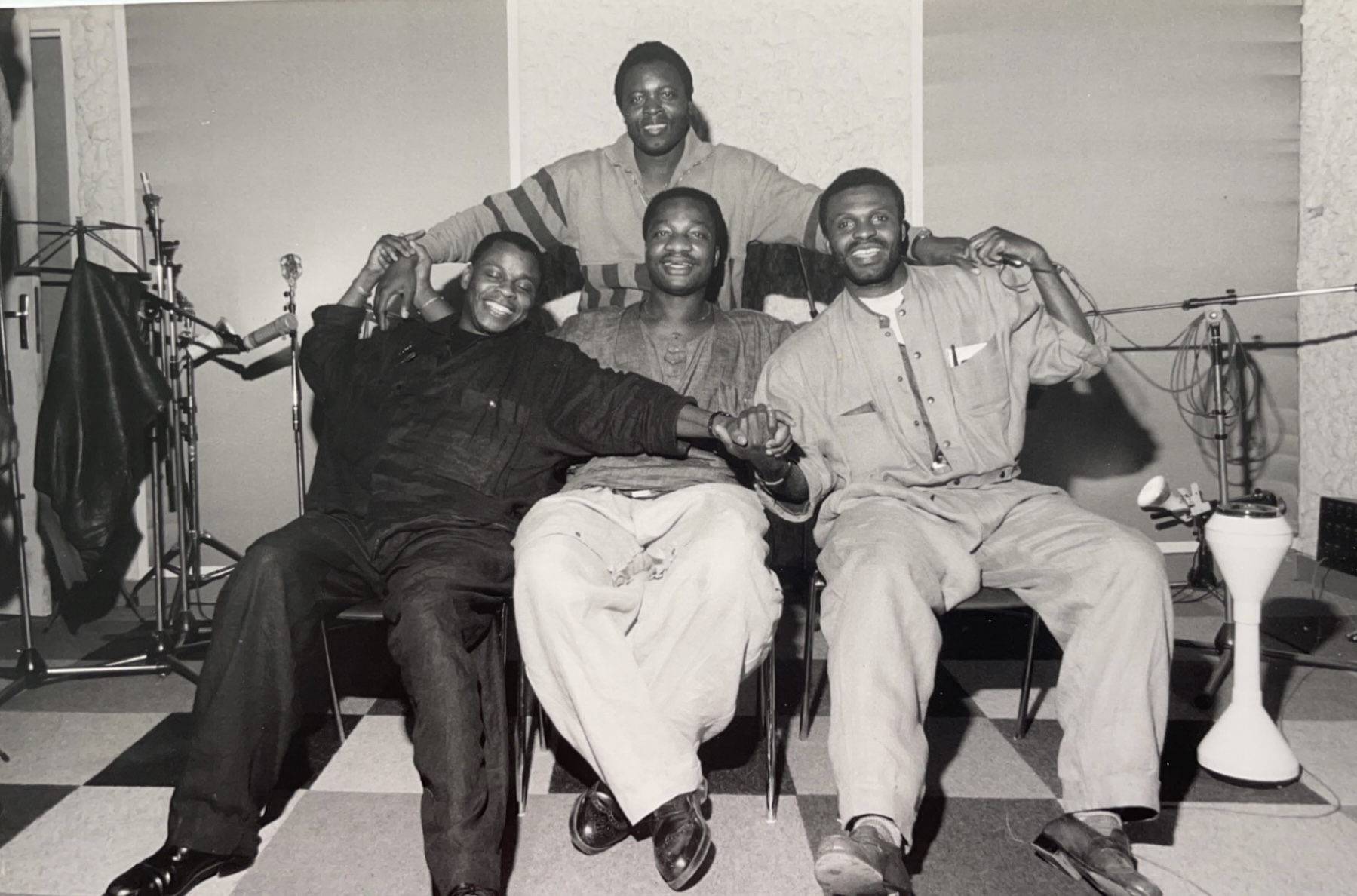
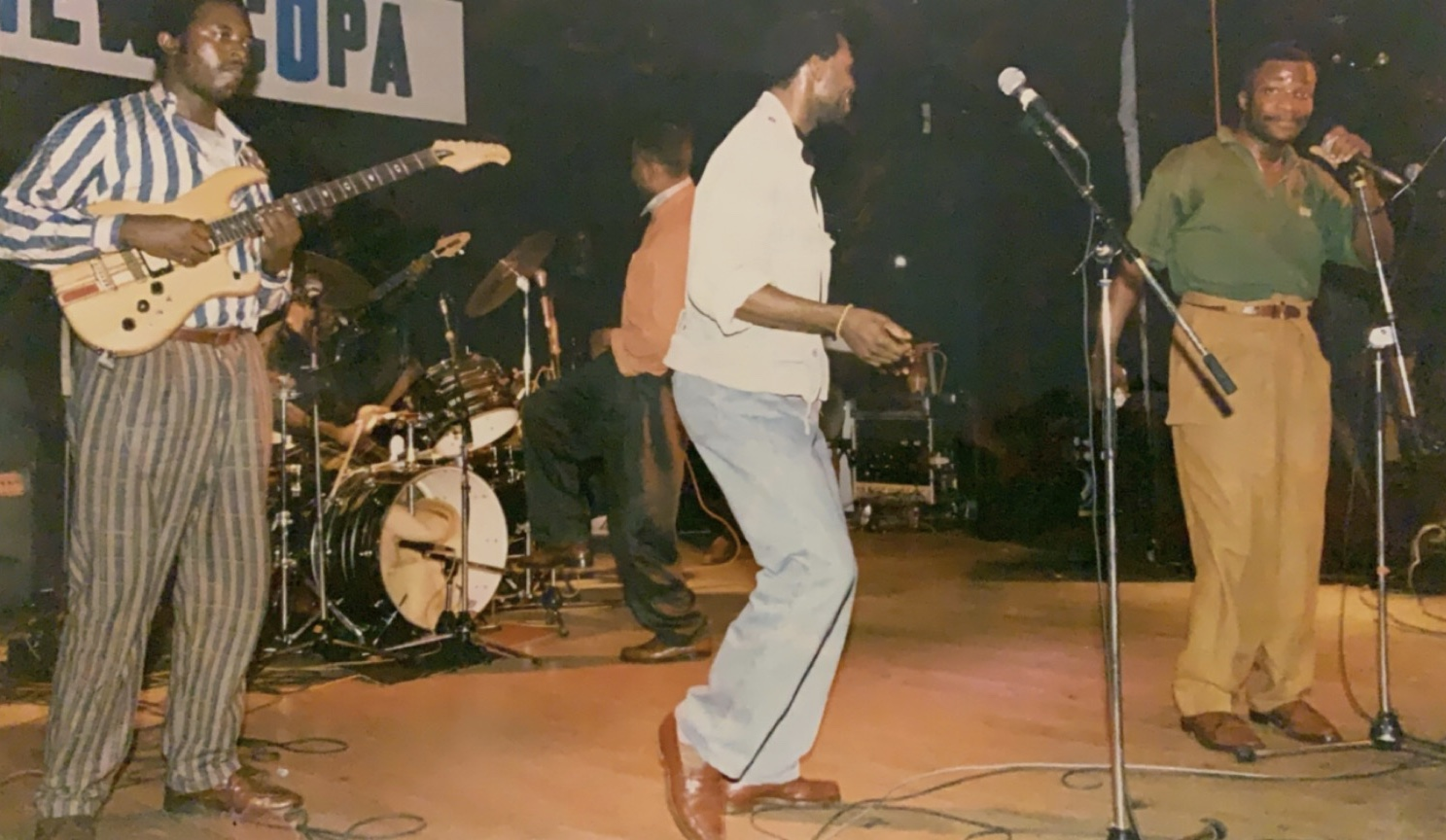
The Loketo group, established by Aurlus Mabélé and Diblo Dibala, emerged as a prominent soukous band during the 1980s and 1990s.

The influx of Zairean artists to France catalyzed the proliferation of Parisian studios as epicenters for soukous production, with an increasing reliance on synthesizers and electronic instruments. Some artists continued to record for the Congolese market, but others abandoned the demands of the Kinshasa public and set out to pursue new audiences. A sizable Zairean community established itself in France and Switzerland, with Zairean artists conducting training programs in the country. Kanda Bongo Man, another Paris-based artist, pioneered fast, short tracks conducive for play on dance floors worldwide, popularly known as kwassa kwassa, after the dance moves popularized in his and other artists' music videos. This music appealed to Africans and to new audiences as well. Artists like Diblo Dibala, Aurlus Mabélé, Tchicl Tchicaya, Jeannot Bel Musumbu, Mbilia Bel, Yondo Sister, Tinderwet, Loketo, Rigo Star, Nyboma, Madilu System, Souzy Kasseya, Soukous Stars and veterans like Pépé Kallé and Koffi Olomidé followed suit. Soon Paris became home to talented studio musicians who recorded for the African and Caribbean markets and filled out bands for occasional tours. Diblo Dibala and Aurlus Mabélé dominated the clubs with "Africa Moussou", creating a hyperactive style of super-speed soukous, dubbed TGV soukous by fans, alluding to France's high-speed trains.

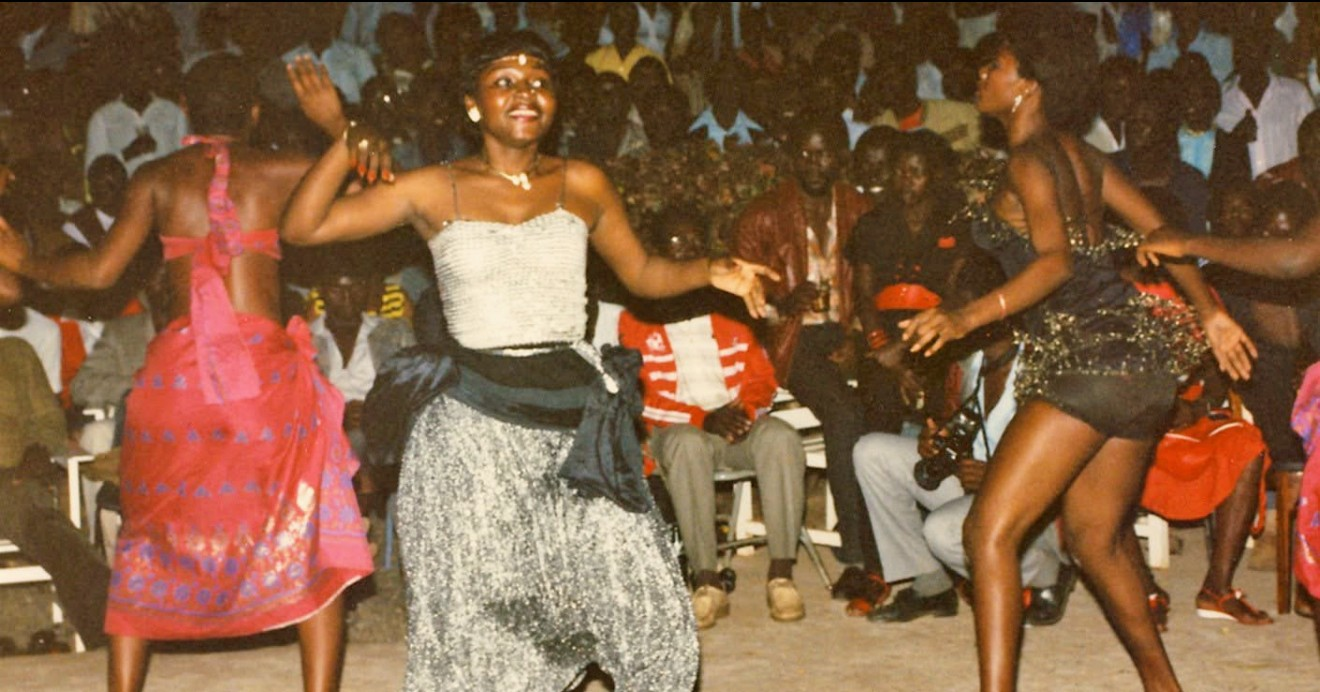
Mbilia Bel (center) performing in Kinshasa, Zaire, in 1986.

Israeli songwriter David Halfon's instrument shop in Saint-Michel became a central hub for African musicians, even as most Africans in Paris lived in Barbès, Saint-Denis, or Montreuil, the latter known for hosting the largest Malian community outside Mali. The shop became a bridge to the homeland, offering the sound of the familiar for a diaspora far from home. As business grew, David opened a full-fledged Afric' Music store, where his son Hervé, who worked after school, absorbed the sounds of Congo, Senegal, Nigeria, and the French Antilles. In 1988, David sold the store to start a chain of fast-food restaurants but continued to produce African music acts, including Diblo Dibala & Matchatcha, Les Cœurs Brisés, Branché, and Flaïsha Mani, nicknamed "the Diamond of Zaire".

Swede-Swede, a band exclusively employing traditional instruments, operates out of Belgium, while Les Malo, primarily comprising former instructors from the National Institute of Arts in Kinshasa, specializes in Afro-jazz in Lyon. Tshala Muana gained prominence in Africa and Europe for her Luba traditional hip-swaying dance known as mutuashi, which make waves across African stadiums and earned her the moniker of "Queen of Mutuashi". Other female vocalists such as Déesse Mukangi, Djena Mandako, Faya Tess, Isa, and Abby Surya garnered widespread recognition. On 25 July 2000, the World Music Network released The Rough Guide to Congolese Soukous, a compilation album that showcased a diverse selection of songs by artists such as Franco Luambo, Tabu Ley Rochereau, Kanda Bongo Man, Papa Wemba, Koffi Olomide, Zaïko Langa Langa, Ry-Co Jazz, Déesse Mukangi, Pépé Kallé, Thu Zahina, Yondo Sister, Nouvelle Génération, and Sam Mangwana.

== Ndombolo ==
By the late 1990s, musicians such as Radja Kula, Wenge Musica, Koffi Olomidé, Général Defao, and Extra Musica metamorphosed soukous into raunchy, frenetic hip-swinging dance music, renaming it ndombolo. This style surged in popularity across Africa and into the continent's diaspora in Belgium, France, the UK, Germany, Canada, and the United States. However, by the early 2000s, ndombolo faced scrutiny, with accusations of obscenity leading to attempts to prohibit it from state media in the Democratic Republic of the Congo, Cameroon, Senegal, Mali, and Kenya. In February 2005, ndombolo music videos in the Democratic Republic of the Congo underwent censorship for indecency, which resulted in the banning of videos by Koffi Olomidé, JB Mpiana, and Werrason from airwaves. Despite the censure, ndombolo record sales surged, remaining popular with new releases dominating discos, bars, and clubs across Africa.

== See also ==
- List of Soukous musicians
- List of Democratic Republic of the Congo musicians
- Music of the Democratic Republic of the Congo
- Sébène
- Champeta

== Bibliography ==
- Gary Stewart (2000). Rumba on the River: A History of the Popular Music of the Two Congos. Verso. ISBN 1-85984-368-9.
- Wheeler, Jesse Samba (March 2005). "Rumba Lingala as Colonial Resistance". Image & Narrative (10). Archived from the original on January 15, 2016.
