= Kwassa kwassa =

Music genre and type of dance

Kwassa kwassa (or kwasa kwasa) is a dance created by Jeanora, a mechanic in Kinshasa from the Democratic Republic of the Congo, that started in the 1980s, where the hips move back and forth while the hands move to follow the hips. It was very popular in Africa.

The dance was popularized by soukous music videos, as well as the videos of Kanda Bongo Man, Pepe Kalle, Viva La Musica, and other Congolese musicians. For the first time in Congo, all the groups adopted these dance steps. This had not happened before because bands preferred to have their own specific dance.

== Etymology ==
According to Jeanora, the words kwassa kwassa comes from the Kikongo language, meaning "I'm working".

== Origins ==
In 1986, the neighborhoods of Kinshasa were contested by leading Congolese rumba artists and groups such as Zaïko Langa Langa, Papa Wemba and Viva La Musica, King Kester Emeneya and many others. A mechanic from Kinshasa, Jeanora, then created a dance he called Kwassa kwassa, imitating the use of a gearshift. He made numerous performances on Zaire's national television and taught the dance in bars and ngandas. He also claimed that he won an award of the "Best vedette of Africa". The dance was widely popularized by Paris-based singer Kanda Bongo Man.

As of 2022, Jeanora currently lives in Kongo Central.

This kind of beat is referenced in the 2008 song "Cape Cod Kwassa Kwassa" by American indie rock band Vampire Weekend.
