= List of stage names: P =

This list of stage names lists names used by those in the entertainment industry, alphabetically by their stage name's surname (or the best approximation) followed by the given name (or the best approximation) where the surname begins with "P". One-word stage names are presented in List of one-word stage names.

Stage name	Birth name	Life	Notability	Notes
Drs. P	Heinz Polzer	1919–2015	Swiss singer-songwriter and poet	
Master P	Percy Robert Miller	1970–	American rapper, record producer, record executive and actor	
Styles P	David Styles	1974–	American rapper (The Lox)	
Augustus Pablo	Horace Swaby	1953–1999	Jamaican record producer	
Petey Pablo	Moses Barrett III	1973–	American rapper	
Bela Padilla	Krista Elyse Hidalgo Sullivan	1991–	Filipino actress, host, singer, writer, and director	
Anita Page	Anita Pomares	1910–2008	American actress	
Gale Page	Sally Perkins Rutter	1910–1983	American actress	
Geneviève Page	Genèvieve Bronjean	1927–2025	French actress	
Patti Page	Clara Fowler	1927–2013	American singer and actress	
Samuel Page	Samuel Elliott	1976–	American actor	
Teddy Page	Teddy Chiu		Filipino film director	
Debra Paget	Debralee Griffin	1933–	American actress	
Elaine Paige	Elaine Jill Bickerstaff	1948–	English singer and actress	
Janis Paige	Donna Mae Tjaden	1922–2024	American actress and singer	
Robert Paige	John Arthur Paige	1911–1987	American actor and newscaster	
George Pal	György Pál Marczincsák	1908–1980	Hungarian-American director and producer	
Jack Palance	Volodymyr Palahniuk	1919–2006	American actor, musician and boxer	Also known as Jack Brazzo
Gloria Pall	Gloria Pallatz	1927–2012	American model, actress and author	
Andrea Palma	Guadalupe Pérez	1903–1987	Mexican actress	
Joe Palma	Joseph Provenzano	1905–1994	American actor	
Wally Palmar	Volodymyr Palamarchuk	1953–	American musician (The Romantics)	
Betsy Palmer	Patricia Betsy Hrunek	1926–2015	American actress	
Lilli Palmer	Lilli Peisler	1914–1986	German actress and writer	
Maria Palmer	Maria Pichler	1917–1981	Austrian-American actress	
Patsy Palmer	Julie Harris	1972–	English actress and DJ	
Kyary Pamyu Pamyu	Kiriko Takemura	1993–	Japanese singer	
Hermes Pan	Hermes Panagiotopoulos	1909–1990	American dancer and choreographer	
Mikill Pane	Justin-Smith Uzomba	1984–	English rapper	
Horace Panter	Stephen Panter	1953–	English musician (The Specials)	Also known as Sir Horace Gentleman
Hip Hop Pantsula	Jabulani Tsambo	1980–2018	South African rapper	
Irene Papas	Eirini Lelekou	1929–2022	Greek actress and singer	Also known as Irene Pappas
Jerry Paris	William Gerald Grossman	1925–1986	American actor and director	
Mica Paris	Michelle Wallen	1969–	English singer, presenter and actress	
Annie Parisse	Anne Marie Cancelmi	1975–	American actress	
Elgin Park	Michael Andrews	1967–	American musician, producer and composer	
Harry Parke	Harold Einstein	1904–1958	American comedian and writer	
Cecil Parker	Cecil Schwabe	1897–1971	English actor	
Colonel Tom Parker	Andreas van Kuijk	1909–1997	Dutch musical entrepreneur	
Errol Parker	Raphäel Schecroun	1925–1998	French-Algerian jazz musician	
Jean Parker	Lois Green	1915–2005	American actress	
Kay Parker	Kay Taylor	1944–2022	English pornographic actress	
Mary Parker	Mary Frances Roberson	1918–1988	American actress	
Royal Parker	Royal Pollokoff	1929–2016	American television personality	
Dian Parkinson	Dianna Batts	1944–	American former model and actress	
Allison Parks	Gloria Waldron	1941–2010	American model and actress	
Bert Parks	Bertram Jacobson	1914–1992	American actor and singer	
Dita Parlo	Grethe Kornstadt (or Kornwald)	1908–1971	German actress	
Gigi Parrish	Katherine Gertrude McElroy	1912–2006	American actress	
Julie Parrish	Ruby Wilbar	1940–2003	American actress	
Leslie Parrish	Marjorie Hellen	1935–2025	American actress, activist, writer and producer	
Elli Parvo	Elvira Gobbo	1915–2010	Italian actress	
Sylvia Pasquel	Silvia Banquells	1950–	Mexican actress	
George Pastell	George/Nino Pastellides	1923–1976	Cypriot actor	
Niña Pastori	María Rosa García García	1978–	Spanish flamenco singer	
Fat Pat	Patrick Hawkins	1970–1998	American rapper (Screwed Up Click)	Also known as Mr. Fat Pat
Wally Patch	Walter Sydney Vinnicombe	1888–1970	English actor and comedian	
Butch Patrick	Patrick Alan Lilley	1953–	American actor and musician	
Dennis Patrick	Dennis Patrick Harrison	1918–2002	American character actor	
Tera Patrick	Linda Hopkins	1976–	American former pornographic actress and model	
Brian Patton	Brian Elliott	1933–	English comedian and actor (Patton Brothers)	
Jimmy Patton	James Elliott	1931–2019	English comedian and actor (Patton Brothers)	
Aaron Paul	Aaron Paul Sturtevant	1979–	American actor and producer	
Andrew Paul	Paul Andrew Herman	1961–	English actor	
Billy Paul	Paul Williams	1934–2016	American soul singer	
Les Paul	Lester Polsfuss	1915–2009	American musician, songwriter and inventor (Les Paul and Mary Ford)	
Prince Paul	Paul Houston	1967–	American record producer and disc jockey (Stetsasonic)	
Sean Paul	Sean Paul Henriques	1973–	Jamaican rapper and singer	
Vinnie Paul	Vincent Paul Abbott	1964–2018	American musician (Pantera and Damageplan)	
Rose Pauly	Rose Pollak	1894–1975	Hungarian opera singer	
Marisa Pavan	Maria Luisa Pierangeli	1932–2023	Italian actress	
Terele Pávez	Teresa Ruiz	1939–2017	Spanish actress	
Johnny Paycheck	Donald Lytle	1938–2003	American country singer	
Allen Payne	Allen Roberts	1968–	American actor	
Warren Peace	Geoffrey MacCormack	1947–	English singer, composer and dancer	
Charlie Peacock	Charles Ashworth	1956–	American singer-songwriter, musician, record producer and author	
Tawny Peaks	Michele Laird	1970–	American retired pornographic actress	
Jack Pearl	Jack Perlman	1894–1982	American actor	
Minnie Pearl	Sarah Ophelia Colley	1912–1996	American comedienne and musician	
Harold Peary	Harrold José Pereira de Faria	1908–1985	American actor, comedian and radio personality	
Orville Peck	Daniel Pitout	1988–	South African country musician	
Gnonnas Pedro	Gnonnan Sossou Pierre Kouassivi	1943–2004	Beninese singer and musician (Africando)	
John Peel	John Ravenscroft	1939–2004	English disc jockey and radio presenter	
Lil Peep	Gustav Åhr	1996–2017	American rapper and singer-songwriter (GothBoiClique)	
D. H. Peligro	Darren Henley	1959–2022	American musician (Dead Kennedys)	
Marti Pellow	Mark McLachlan	1965–	Scottish singer (Wet Wet Wet)	
Queen Pen	Lynise Walters	1972–	American rapper, record producer and novelist	
Mike Pender	Michael John Prendergast	1941–	English singer and musician (The Searchers)	
Emma Penella	Manuela Ruiz Penella	1931–2007	Spanish actress	
Dan Penn	Wallace Daniel Pennington	1941–	American singer, songwriter, musician and record producer	
Kal Penn	Kalpen Modi	1977–	American actor and author	
Willie Pep	Guglielmo Papaleo	1922–2006	American boxer	
Cynthia Pepper	Cynthia Culpepper	1940–	American actress	
Jack Pepper	Edward Culpepper	1902–1979	American vaudeville performer, comedian, singer and musician	
Derelys Perdue	Geraldine Perdue	1902–1989	American actress	
Melanie Peres	Melanie Thanee	1971–	Israeli model and actress	
Pinetop Perkins	Joseph Perkins	1913–2011	American musician	
Lynne Perrie	Jean Dudley	1931–2006	English actress, singer and television personality	
Joan Perry	Elizabeth Miller	1911–1996	American actress	
Joe Perry	Anthony Joe Pereira	1950–	American musician (Aerosmith)	
Katy Perry	Katheryn Elizabeth Hudson	1984–	American singer and songwriter	
Lee "Scratch" Perry	Rainford Perry	1936–2021	Jamaican record producer, composer and singer	
Steve Perry	Stephen Pereira	1949–	American singer and songwriter (Journey)	
Produce Pete	Peter James Napolitano Jr.	1945–2026	American grocer, chef and celebrity spokesperson	
Arnold Peters	Peter Gadd	1925–2013	English actor	
Bernadette Peters	Bernadette Lazzara	1948–	American actress, singer and author	
Luan Peters	Carol Hirsch	1946–2017	English actress and singer	
Roberta Peters	Roberta Peterman	1930–2017	American opera singer	
Susan Peters	Suzanne Carnahan	1921–1952	American actress	
Gilles Peterson	Gilles Moehrle	1964–	French-English broadcaster and DJ	
Lenka Peterson	Betty Isacson	1925–2021	American actress	
Le Pétomane	Joseph Pujol	1857–1945	French entertainer	
Olga Petrova	Muriel Harding	1884–1977	English-American actress	
Raymond Pettibon	Raymond Ginn	1957–	American artist	
Jazze Pha	Phalon Alexander	1969–	American record producer, singer, songwriter and rapper	
Slim Jim Phantom	James McDonnell	1961–	American musician (Stray Cats)	
Lee Phelps	Napoleon Bonaparte Kukuck	1893–1953	American actor	
Gina Philips	Gina Consolo	1970–	American actress	
Barney Phillips	Bernard Ofner	1913–1982	American actor	
Conrad Phillips	Conrad Havord	1925–2016	English actor	
Esther Phillips	Esther Jones	1935–1984	American singer	
Sam Phillips	Leslie Phillips	1962–	American singer and songwriter	
Sally Phipps	Nellie Bogdon	1911–1978	American actress	
Pat Phoenix	Patricia Mansfield	1923–1986	English actress	
Édith Piaf	Édith Gassion	1915–1963	French singer	
Slim Pickens	Louis Lindley Jr.	1919–1983	American rodeo performer and actor	
Jack Pickford	John Smith	1896–1933	Canadian-American actor	
Lottie Pickford	Charlotte Smith	1893–1936	Canadian-American actress	
Mary Pickford	Gladys Smith	1892–1979	Canadian-American actress	
Molly Picon	Małka Opiekun	1898–1992	American actress	
Monsieur Pierre	Pierre Zucher-Margolle	1890–1963	French dancer	
Janet Pilgrim	Charlaine Karalus	1934–2017	American model	
Jacques Pills	René Jacques Ducos	1906–1970	French singer and actor	
Bonnie Pink	Kaori Asada	1973–	Japanese singer-songwriter and musician	
Camila Pitanga	Camila Manhães	1977–	Brazilian actress and former model	
Ingrid Pitt	Ingoushka Petrov	1937–2010	Polish-English actress	
Eddie Platt	Edward Platakis	1921–2010	American musician	
Marc Platt	Marcel LePlat	1913–2014	American ballet dancer and actor	
Wendy Playfair	Wendy Playfair Williams	1974–2026	Australian actress	
Alice Playten	Alice Plotkin	1947–2011	American actress	
Martin Plaza	Martin Murphy	1955–	Australian singer-songwriter	
King Pleasure	Clarence Beeks	1922–1982	American jazz singer	
Yannis Ploutarchos	Yannis Kakossaios	1970–	Greek singer and songwriter	
Daphne Pollard	Daphne Trott	1891–1978	Australian-American actress and dancer	
Michael J. Pollard	Michael John Pollack Jr.	1939–2019	American actor	
Doc Pomus	Jerome Felder	1925–1991	American blues singer and songwriter	
Poncie Ponce	Ponciano Tabac Ponce	1933–2013	American actor, musician and comedian	
Norma Pons	Norma Orizi	1942–2014	Argentine actress	
Rosa Ponselle	Rosa Ponzillo	1897–1981	American opera singer	
Roger Pontare	Roger Johansson	1951–	Swedish musician	
Cassandra Ponti	Lejanie Anigan	1978–	Filipina former actress, dancer and model	
Big Pooh	Thomas Jones III	1980–	American rapper (Little Brother)	
DJ Pooh	Mark Jordan	1969–	American record producer, rapper, actor, screenwriter and film director	
Denniz PoP	Dag Volle	1963–1998	Swedish DJ, music producer and songwriter	
Iggy Pop	James Newell Osterberg Jr.	1947–	American singer, musician, songwriter and actor (The Stooges)	
Jimmy Pop	James Moyer Franks	1972–	American musician (Bloodhound Gang)	Also known as Jimmy Pop Ali
Lucia Popp	Lucia Poppová	1939–1993	Slovak opera singer	
Nils Poppe	Nils Jönsson	1908–2000	Swedish actor, comedian, director and screenwriter	
Mike Post	Leland Michael Postil	1944–	American composer	
El Potro	Rodrigo Alejandro Bueno	1973–2000	Argentine singer	
Nell Potts	Elinor Newman	1959–	American former child actress	
Hans Poulsen	Bruce Poulsen	1945–2023	Australian singer-songwriter	
Jane Powell	Suzanne Burce	1929–2021	American actress, singer and dancer	
Cat Power	Chan Marshall	1972–	American singer-songwriter	
Duffy Power	Raymond Howard	1941–2014	English singer and musician	
Bridget Powers	Cheryl Murphy	1980–	American pornographic actress	Often credited as Bridget the Midget or Bridget Powerz
Joey Powers	Joseph Ruggiero	1934–2017	American pop singer and songwriter	
Kid Congo Powers	Brian Tristan	1959–	American musician, singer and actor	
Stefanie Powers	Stefanie Paul	1942–	American actress	
Patty Pravo	Nicoletta Strambelli	1948–	Italian singer	
Peach PRC	Sharlee Jade Curnow	1997–	Australian singer-songwriter and social media personality	
Ann Prentiss	Ann Ragusa	1939–2010	American actress	
Paula Prentiss	Paula Ragusa	1938–	American actress	
Norm Prescott	Norman Pransky	1927–2005	American film producer	
Micheline Presle	Micheline Chassagne	1922–2024	French actress	Also known as Micheline Prelle
Reg Presley	Reginald Ball	1941–2013	English singer and songwriter (The Troggs)	
Hovis Presley	Richard McFarlane	1960–2005	English poet and stand-up comedian	
Lawrence Pressman	David Pressman	1939–	American actor	
Johnny Preston	Johnny Preston Courville	1939–2011	American singer	
Robert Preston	Robert Preston Meservey	1918–1987	American actor and singer	
Wayde Preston	William Strange	1929–1992	American actor	
Marie Prevost	Marie Bickford Dunn	1896–1937	Canadian-American actress	
Chilton Price	Chilton Searcy	1913–2010	American songwriter	
Leontyne Price	Mary Violet Leontine Price	1927–	American opera singer	
Dickie Pride	Richard Kneller	1941–1969	English singer	
Maxi Priest	Max Elliot	1961–	English singer	
Barry Prima	Humbertus Knoch	1954–	Indonesian actor and martial artist	
Roshan Prince	Rajiv Kaplish	1981–	Indian singer, producer, musician, songwriter and actor	
Aileen Pringle	Alieen Bisbee	1895–1989	American actress	
Yvonne Printemps	Yvonne Wignolle	1894–1977	French singer and actress	
Freddie Prinze	Frederick Pruetzel	1954–1977	American actor and comedian	
P. J. Proby	James Smith	1938–	American singer, songwriter and actor	
Michael Prophet	Michael Haynes	1957–2017	Jamaican singer	
Robert Prosky	Robert Porzuczek	1930–2008	American actor	
Jeanne Pruett	Norma Jean Bowman	1937–	American country singer and songwriter	
Nicholas Pryor	Nicholas Probst	1935–2024	American actor	
Grand Puba	William Dixon III	1966–	American rapper (Brand Nubian)	
Lil Pump	Gazzy Garcia	2000–	American rapper	
Big Pun	Christopher Rios	1971–2000	American rapper (Terror Squad)	
