= List of ChuckleVision episodes =

ChuckleVision is a British television entertainment programme starring the Chuckle Brothers.

== Episodes ==
=== Series 1 (1987) ===
#	Original Airdate	Title	Plot	Armchair Theatre	Simon Lovell	Notes
1 – 1.1	26 September 1987	"Breakfast"	The brothers host a breakfast show, with weather reports, interviews, and others	"Mr. Crackenthorpe‘s Bath"	Simon Lovell does a trick with a foreign newspaper	First episode of ChuckleVision
2 – 1.2	3 October 1987	"Dance"	The brothers host the history, and a showcase, of dance	"The Twenty Elephant Restaurant"	Simon Lovell does a trick with 3 cups and a cloth with his "ant"	Deleted scene: an unknown scene with the brothers break—dancing appears in the intro
3 – 1.3	10 October 1987	"Sport"	The brothers host a showcase of sports, including footage from the Crucible, a look behind the scenes at Anfield, and more.. in Armchair Theatre, "Kite Crazy"..			
4 – 1.4	17 October 1987	"Movies"	Paul tries to make a movie, "A Tale of Two Cities".	"Miss Munson and the Festival“	Simon Lovell turns a black and white picture into colour, without using any paint	
5 – 1.5	24 October 1987	"Fitness"	Paul tries to get Barry to get fit, by bicycle rides, trips to the gym, and others	"Alfie‘s Green Cabbage"	Simon Lovell does a trick with a rope	
6 – 1.6	31 October 1987	"Halloween"	Paul tries to cast a spell, and the brothers sleep out at a "haunted" campsite	"All You‘ve Ever Wanted"	None	
7 – 1.7	7 November 1987	"Antiques"	The brothers host a show all about antiques, including Barry recreating the Mona Lisa	"Day Trip to Llandundo"	Simon Lovell does a trick using a box and some dice	
8 – 1.8	14 November 1987	"Travel"	The brothers host a show all about travel, with trips to the zoo, France and other places	"Sammy‘s Special"	Simon Lovell tries to make a card move (with help from the McChuckles)	
9 – 1.9	21 November 1987	"Fashion"	The brothers try to make clothes	"Gran‘s Jumper	Simon Lovell makes two silks vanish and appear (with help from Barry)	
10 – 1.10	28 November 1987	"Magic"	The brothers host a show all about magic, including such tricks as the disappearing bus trick (the bus moves away)	"Albert‘s Dock"	After appearing throughout the episode trying to do a trick, Simon Lovell colors a book with no pens	
11 – 1.11	5 December 1987	"DIY"	The brothers attempt to do some D.I.Y, with going to the department store and other items	"A Job Well Done"	Simon Lovell puts pins through a window without breaking it	
12 – 1.12	12 December 1987	"Open Ear"	The brothers show viewer—requested clips, such as "The ChuckleFreds" and them in a pottery shop	"Ideas Above his Station"	Simon Lovell does two tricks: one with a bow tie, and one with lids	
13 – 1.13	19 December 1987	"Traditional Christmas"	The brothers talk about Christmas traditions, with Barry wanting a present.	"Micheal‘s Donkey"	Simon Lovell makes a Christmas cake (with help from the McChuckles)	

This series was released onto DVD in October 2011. It was rereleased in July 2016.

=== Series 2 (1988–1989) ===
#	Original Air date	Title	Plot	Armchair Theatre	Other Notes
14 – 2.1	19 November 1988	"Clean Up"	The brothers move to a new studio, and try to clean up before the landlord comes	"Gert & Lil‘s New Start"	
15 – 2.2	26 November 1988	"Australia"	The brothers talk about Australia, with Australian fashion, a visit to the Sydney Opera House (via Blue Screen) and others	"A Cousin from Australia"	
16 – 2.3	3 December 1988	"Nature Watch"	The brothers show a hide, and go bird—watching	"Doggy Tale"	
17 – 2.4	10 December 1988	"Music"	The brothers talk about different types of music, with instruments, opera, and a musical performance by the McChuckles	"Caretaker Take Care"	
18 – 2.5	17 December 1988	"Hobbies"	The brothers talk about different hobbies people might have, such as railroads, RC planes, and others	"Grandpa‘s Collection"	
19 – 2.6	24 December 1988	"Christmas Special"	Barry works on a Christmas show, while Paul thinks it‘s all about Easter	"Father Christmas‘s Accident"	
20 – 2.7	7 January 1989	"Farming"	The brothers showcase the history of farming, and different farming material	"Mixed Vegetables"	
21 – 2.8	14 January 1989	"U.F.O"	Paul tries to see if flying saucers really exist	"The Biggest Puzzle of All"	
22 – 2.9	21 January 1989	"Inventions"	Paul makes different inventions, and tries to get to a train with them	"Big Headed Brian"	
23 – 2.10	28 January 1989	"Hi-Tech"	After trying to keep Barry out of the studio, Paul tries to make a robot	"Magnus the Magnet"	
24 – 2.11	4 February 1989	"Puppets"	The brothers showcase the performing arts, while also making one	"The Puppet Man"	
25 – 2.12	11 February 1989	"Fishing"	The brothers showcase fishing, and go on a trip	"Slimeball Simon"	
26 – 2.13	18 February 1989	"Circus"	The brothers showcase different circus acts, with Barry as the human cannonball	"Clowning Around"	Last episode in the Blue Peter—esque format

This series was released onto DVD in October 2012. It was rereleased in August 2016.

=== Series 3 (1989–1990) ===
#	Original Airdate	Title	Plot	Other notes
27 – 3.1	2 December 1989	"Stand and Deliver"	The brothers start a newspaper delivery service, and they keep coming across a mean man..	First episode in the new “sitcom” format, that would stay for the rest of the series
28 – 3.2	9 December 1989	"Parks and Wreck-reations"	The brothers are park keepers, and make a mess of the place!	
29 – 3.3	16 December 1989	"Stop That World...!"	The brothers are tasked with looking after Uncle Henry‘s mansion, and end up chasing his metal globe..	
30 – 3.4	23 December 1989	"Home Helpless"	Still at Uncle Henry‘s, Paul keeps pranking Barry, before Barry frightens him back!	
31 – 3.5	30 December 1989	"Shipshape-less"	The brothers go sailing on the Good Ship Saucy Sal, and end up sinking the river!	
32 – 3.6	6 January 1990	"Window Wind-Ups"	The brothers are window cleaners, and Barry has the sneezes..	
33 – 3.7	13 January 1990	"Trouble in Store"	The brothers try to clean up a store before opening time, and end up making more mess!	A deleted scene appears in the intro
34 – 3.8	20 January 1990	"Poster Pranks"	The brothers try to plaster up a billboard	
35 – 3.9	27 January 1990	"On the Move...."	The brothers are removal men, and make mistakes when the number plate flips upside down..	
36 – 3.10	3 February 1990	"Car Carnage"	The brothers are car cleaners, but when they‘re done, the car falls apart!	
37 – 3.11	10 February 1990	"Hotel Hostilities"	The brothers work at a hotel, and when the entertainment doesn‘t show up, the brothers take over!	A deleted scene appears in the intro
38 – 3.12	17 February 1990	"Cabbies and Chips"	The brothers look after Maxie the Taxi‘s shop	
39 – 3.13	24 February 1990	"Cycle Crazy"	The brothers enter a bicycle race..	

- Episode 11, "Hotel Hostilities", was the first appearance of "No Slacking", a character played by Paul and Barry's real life brother Jimmy Patton of the Patton Brothers.
- This series was released onto DVD in April 2017.

=== Series 4 (1991) ===
#	Original Airdate	Title	Plot
40 – 4.1	21 September 1991	"Plumb Crazy"	The brothers have to fix a water fountain for Mrs. Blenkinsop
41 – 4.2	28 September 1991	"Cafe Chuckles"	The brothers learn a royal visitor is coming to their cafe..
42 – 4.3	5 October 1991	"The Perils of Porters"	The brothers work at a hospital
43 – 4.4	12 October 1991	"Telephone Traumas"	The brothers have to fix a telephone
44 – 4.5	19 October 1991	"Goofy Golfers"	The brothers play golf
45 – 4.6	26 October 1991	"Market Forces"	Paul decides to become a custamonger
46 – 4.7	2 November 1991	"The Great Outdoors"	Paul and Barry are tent testers, so go camping to check them out
47 – 4.8	9 November 1991	"Bowl-derdash"	After checking the difference between cricket bowling and ten—pin bowling, the brothers volunteer as cricket players
48 – 4.9	16 November 1991	"Careless Caretakers"	The brothers take care of Dan the Van‘s office
49 – 4.10	23 November 1991	"Carpet Capers"	Back at Mrs. Blenkinsop‘s, the brothers fit a new carpet
50 – 4.11	30 November 1991	"Shore Thing"	The brothers build a beach hut
51 – 4.12	7 December 1991	"In the Doghouse"	The brothers look after Uncle Henry‘s dogs
52 – 4.13	14 December 1991	"On the Trail"	The brothers look for Lefeet‘s lost treasure
53 – 4.14	21 December 1991	"Oddball Inventors"	Paul makes different inventions
54 – 4.15	28 December 1991	"Movie Moguls"	The brothers turn a bingo house into what it once was: a cinema

- Episode 3, "The Perils of Porters" was the first appearance of the updated theme tune in the closing credits, the updated theme tune would then make its first appearance in the opening titles of Episode 8, "Bowl-Derdash". "Goofy Golfers", "Plumb Crazy" and "Bowl—Derdash" all appeared on VHS under the name "Goofy Golfers" in 1993.

=== Series 5 (1992–1993) ===
#	Original Airdate	Title	Plot
55 – 5.1	26 September 1992	"Caravan Capers"	The brothers get a caravan, while running in to an angry farmer..
56 – 5.2	3 October 1992	"Crimebusters"	The brothers face a police officer, which they think is a burglar..
57 – 5.3	10 October 1992	"Up in the Air"	The brothers fly a hot air balloon
58 – 5.4	17 October 1992	"Ducks and Grouses"	The brothers go duck hunting
59 – 5.5	24 October 1992	"A Lazy Day"	The brothers face a broken ChuckMobile, a fly and TV shows
60 – 5.6	31 October 1992	"Rock a Bye Baby"	The brothers become babysitters
61 – 5.7	7 November 1992	"In the Ring"	The brothers visit a leisure Centre, and Paul ends up wrestling "Brian"
62 – 5.8	14 November 1992	"Romany Days"	The brothers go to a fun fair in search of the emperor‘s ceremonial underpants
63 – 5.9	21 November 1992	"On the Radio"	After Paul makes a mix track, the brothers try to get it on the radio
64 – 5.10	28 November 1992	"Rich for a Day"	The brothers spend the day at a mansion, after winning what they think is first prize in a contest
65 – 5.11	5 December 1992	"Runners and Riders"	Paul teaches Barry how to be a jockey
66 – 5.12	12 December 1992	"Wrong Number"	After misremembering a phone number, Paul and Barry are chased by spies
67 – 5.13	19 December 1992	"The Art Dealers"	The brothers set a painting in a house
68 – 5.14	26 December 1992	"Spooks and Gardens"	The location of a haunted house is also the location of a peaceful garden
69 – 5.15	2 January 1993	"Minibus Madness"	The brothers are minibus drivers, but first, they need customers!

=== Series 6 (1994) ===
#	Original Airdate	Title	Plot
70 – 6.1	8 January 1994	"Under Lock and Key"	After selling their caravan, the brothers set a new security system for their place of business, the Mill..
71 – 6.2	15 January 1994	"Gala Performance"	The brothers become theatre agents, and have to put on a performance..
72 – 6.3	22 January 1994	"Pizza the Action"	The brothers become Pizza delivery men..
73 – 6.4	29 January 1994	"Mystery Tour"	The brothers become tour guides, but when they get lost, they make a tour of their own..
74 – 6.5	5 February 1994	"The Bells"	The brothers make bells and try to get them to the church..
75 – 6.6	12 February 1994	"Party Planners"	The brothers set up a surprise party..
76 – 6.7	19 February 1994	"Men in White Coats"	Because the brothers are wearing white coats, people think they‘re barbers, ice cream men and others, when all they want to do is get to a job interview!
77 – 6.8	26 February 1994	"Mind Over Marrow"	The brothers fill potholes..
78 – 6.9	5 March 1994	"Headline News"	The brothers start a newspaper business..
79 – 6.10	12 March 1994	"Time Travellers"	While trying to fix No Slacking‘s watch, the brothers accidentally travel through time!
80 – 6.11	19 March 1994	"Treasures of the Deep"	The brothers try finding treasure at the bottom of a park lake, but end up running into an angry warden..
81 – 6.12	26 March 1994	"Airport Assistance"	The brothers attempt to help Mrs. Snow get to her private jet.. before realizing who she really is..
82 – 6.13	2 April 1994	"Grand Hotel"	The brothers turn the Mill into a hotel..
83 – 6.14	9 April 1994	"Chucklemart"	The brothers run a Store..
84 – 6.15	16 April 1994	"Record Breakers"	The brothers attempt to break records, and you won‘t believe which one they DO break!

=== Series 7 (1995) ===
#	Original Airdate	Title	Plot
85 – 7.1	7 January 1995	"Spilt Milk"	The brothers attempt to buy cartons of milk after Barry spills them all..
86 – 7.2	14 January 1995	"The Hunt for Chalky White"	The brothers look for Chalky White, a character from the local newspaper competition..
87 – 7.3	21 January 1995	"Not in Our Back Yard"	The brothers, who start attempting to build a birdhouse, protest against the council, which wants to destroy the Mill..
88 – 7.4	28 January 1995	"Another Fine Ness" (or "Loch Ness")	The brothers compete against the McChuckles to find Nessie..
89 – 7.5	4 February 1995	"Power Play"	The brothers need electricity in their Mill..
90 – 7.6	11 February 1995	"Health Farm"	The brothers sign up for a health hotel, but end up wanting to escape!
91 – 7.7	18 February 1995	"A Clean Sweep"	The brothers attempt to clean a chimney..
92 – 7.8	25 February 1995	"The Missing Piece"	The brothers need to find a missing puzzle piece..
93 – 7.9	4 March 1995	"The Barge"	The brothers help No Slacking with his Barge..
94 – 7.10	11 March 1995	"Pick Your Own"	The brothers look after their friend‘s fruit farm..
95 – 7.11	18 March 1995	"The Final Frontier"	Paul makes a rocket for Barry to go to space..
96 – 7.12	25 March 1995	"My Lucky Number’s Nine"	Barry‘s good luck comes with the number 9..
97 – 7.13	1 April 1995	"Clueless Chuckles"	The brothers attempt to solve a murder mystery..
98 – 7.14	8 April 1995	"What’s Cooking"	The brothers get in the baking business..
99 – 7.15	15 April 1995	"Monkery Business"	The brothers become monks..

- Episode 2, "The Hunt for Chalky White" was the first appearance of "Getoutofit" played by Paul and Barry's real life brother Brian Patton of the Patton Brothers.

=== Series 8 (1995–1996) ===
#	Original Airdate	Title	Plot
100 – 8.1	20 December 1995	"The Exterminators"	The brothers are pest control "experts", but keep running into an angry man..
101 – 8.2	2 January 1996	"Monkey Business"	The brothers run a pet sitting service..
102 – 8.3	9 January 1996	"Marquee Madness"	The brothers break a statue while trying to put up a marquee..
103 – 8.4	16 January 1996	"Out of Sight"	After Barry leaves during Paul‘s testing (and vice versa), they both think they‘re invisible..
104 – 8.5	23 January 1996	"Football Heroes"	The brothers accidentally join Rotherham‘s Football Team..
105 – 8.6	30 January 1996	"Chucklestein"	The brothers become test subjects..
106 – 8.7	6 February 1996	"Oh Brother"	Paul replaces Barry with Getoutofit..
107 – 8.8	13 February 1996	"Lottery Lunacy"	The brothers try to win the lottery..
108 – 8.9	20 February 1996	"Lock In"	The brothers are accidentally locked in a department store, and keep running into an angry security guard..
109 – 8.10	27 February 1996	"Charm School"	The brothers attempt to become butlers..
110 – 8.11	5 March 1996	"Traction Attraction"	Barry enters a vegetable competition..
111 – 8.12	12 March 1996	"Finders Keepers"	No Slacking tries to scare the brothers out of the lighthouse..
112 – 8.13	19 March 1996	"Costa Lotta"	The brothers visit Barcelona..
113 – 8.14	26 March 1996	"Dear Diary"	Paul reads Barry‘s diary (and vice versa), and believes he‘s ready for the "scrap heap" (vice versa again)..
114 – 8.15	29 March 1996	"Steeple Chucks"	The brothers attempt to blow up a chimney..

=== Series 9 (1996–1997) ===
#	Original Airdate	Title	Plot
115 – 9.1	4 December 1996	"Bats in the Belfry"	The brothers remove bats from a church belfry..
116 – 9.2	11 December 1996	"High Jinx"	The brothers attempt to catch a stowaway on a plane..
117 – 9.3	18 December 1996	"Chuckles in Charge"	The brothers run a holiday camp
118 – 9.4	8 January 1997	"Digging for Dinosaurs"	The brothers battle against Miss Fortune for looking for a dinosaur bone.. and to think they were meant to watch rabbits!
119 – 9.5	15 January 1997	"Wheels of Misfortune"	After accidentally getting No Slacking wet, the brothers enter a race with him..
120 – 9.6	22 January 1997	"Paint Drips"	The brothers paint a library..
121 – 9.7	29 January 1997	"The Big Day"	The brothers help a man plan his wedding..
122 – 9.8	5 February 1997	"Loch Aye"	The brothers try to get to Scotland to see the McChuckles in a curling competition, but end up becoming No Slacking‘s crew..
123 – 9.9	12 February 1997	"Lord Chuckle"	Paul thinks he‘s become a lord..
124 – 9.10	19 February 1997	"Oh Dear What Can the Mattress Be?"	The brothers help with a water—bed..
125 – 9.11	26 February 1997	"Shipwrecked"	The brothers get stranded on an island..
126 – 9.12	5 March 1997	"Put Up Job"	While entering a sandcastle competition, the brothers stay at No Slacking‘s motel, but there‘s only room for one!
127 – 9.13	12 March 1997	"Tailor’s Dummies"	The brothers become a tailor‘s assistant, to show off their new jacket..
128 – 9.14	19 March 1997	"Clowning Around"	The brothers join No Slacking‘s circus, and when the main workers don‘t pop up, the brothers join him for a performance of "Singin‘ in The Rain"..
129 – 9.15	26 March 1997	"Kidnapped"	The brothers try to rescue Dan the Van in France..

=== Series 10 (1997–1998) ===
#	Original Airdate	Title	Plot
130 – 10.1	17 December 1997	"The Perils of Petrovich"	The brothers think a Russian ballet dancer is a spy..
131 – 10.2	7 January 1998	"Gold Rush"	The brothers compete against Mick Madas to dig for gold..
132 – 10.3	14 January 1998	"New Pages"	The brothers attempt to deliver a tapestry..
133 – 10.4	21 January 1998	"Outward Bounders"	The brothers join the military..
134 – 10.5	28 January 1998	"The Shout"	The brothers become firemen..
135 – 10.6	4 February 1998	"Flat Broke"	The brothers accidentally deliver a package to the wrong flat..
136 – 10.7	11 February 1998	"Safari Park Keepers"	The brothers work at a safari park, and No Slacking chooses the most dangerous jobs for them to do..
137 – 10.8	18 February 1998	"Stop That Stamp"	The brothers lose a rare stamp, ironically, in a stamp shop!
138 – 10.9	25 February 1998	"A Night at the Theatre"	The brothers think an actor is the phantom..
139 – 10.10	4 March 1998	"Auto-Manics"	The brothers lose their Chuckmobile, and try to clean a car..
140 – 10.11	11 March 1998	"Indiana Chuckles"	The brothers Look for the eighth wonder of the world, and you won’t believe what it is!
141 – 10.12	18 March 1998	"Sleepwalker"	Barry becomes a sleepwalker..
142 – 10.13	25 March 1998	"Big Foot"	The brothers, along with No Slacking, prank each other about "the Big Foot"!
143 – 10.14	1 April 1998	"Waiting for Dan"	The brothers help out at Dan the Van‘s resting home..
144 – 10.15	2 April 1998	"The Gathering"	The brothers travel the globe to get their relatives to come to the new baby‘s Family Christening..

=== Series 11 (1998–1999) ===
#	Original Airdate	Title	Plot
145 – 11.1	22 December 1998	"Breakdown"	The brothers help a bride to get to her wedding, whilst also being a Mexican mariachi..
146 – 11.2	23 December 1998	"Garden Pests"	The brothers work at a greenhouse..
147 – 11.3	6 January 1999	"Matchstick Men"	After breaking No Slacking‘s matchstick boat, the brothers attempt to fix it, and disguise it as Paul having an illness, before they learn that No Slacking is a perfectionist..
148 – 11.4	13 January 1999	"One Man and His Barry"	Paul disguises Barry as a sheepdog for a competition, but it backfires when Barry gets kidnapped!
149 – 11.5	20 January 1999	"Brothers in Law"	After a waterworks incident, the brothers are mistaken for bank robbers!
150 – 11.6	27 January 1999	"Brazil Nuts"	After their kite blows them to the jungle, the brothers find a cursed idol..
151 – 11.7	3 February 1999	"Chairmen Chuckles"	The brothers attempt to ferry people for Dan the Van‘s sedan chair business..
152 – 11.8	10 February 1999	"Stargazing"	The brothers attempt to find a new star..
153 – 11.9	17 February 1999	"All at Sea"	The brothers disguise a bus as a yacht..
154 – 11.10	24 February 1999	"Getting the Bird"	The brothers work in a pet shop..
155 – 11.11	3 March 1999	"Chuckle and Hide"	The brothers make a new sweet, but when people eat it, it leaves a new effect on them..
156 – 11.12	10 March 1999	"Mountain Excitement"	Paul tries to conquer a mountain..
157 – 11.13	17 March 1999	"Optical Illusions"	The brothers work at an optician‘s, and end up at a TV studio!
158 – 11.14	24 March 1999	"In the Soup"	The brothers attempt to make a soup recipe..
Special 11x 15	26 March 1999	"Comic Relief Special"	The brothers attempt to: A) perform and B) make a music video for their song, "Silly Me, Silly You"
159 – 11.15	31 March 1999	"King of the Castle"	Barry is the new king!

=== Series 12 (1999–2000) ===
#	Original Airdate	Title	Plot
160 – 12.1	21 December 1999	"No Pets Allowed"	The brothers attempt to get rid of a rhinoceros from a hotel..
161 – 12.2	22 December 1999	"Lotta Bottle"	Barry gets a arm sprain while delivering milk, and when they get back, they attempt to get a fainted lady to the hospital!
162 – 12.3	5 January 2000	"Spaced Out"	The brothers think they‘ve found aliens!
163 – 12.4	12 January 2000	"Well Suited"	The brothers find a suit that gets rid of any mess..
164 – 12.5	19 January 2000	"King of the Mill"	Barry tries to find the owner of the bakery‘s watch..
165 – 12.6	26 January 2000	"The Maltby Falcon"	A mix up leaves the brothers chased by smugglers!
166 – 12.7	2 February 2000	"Mayor Today, Gone Tomorrow"	The brothers work for the mayor..
167 – 12.8	9 February 2000	"Where’s Auntie?"	The brothers‘ auntie switches with No Slacking‘s auntie!
168 – 12.9	16 February 2000	"Out for the Count"	Barry thinks the hotel manager is a vampire!
169 – 12.10	23 February 2000	"Fete Accompli"	The brothers go to a fete, and encounter a very angry man..
170 – 12.11	1 March 2000	"Double Trouble"	While working at a movie studio, the brothers find a lookalike to Barry!
171 – 12.12	8 March 2000	"Watch the Birdie"	The brothers attempt to remove a nest from their aerial..
172 – 12.13	15 March 2000	"Food For Fort"	The brothers are chefs in the Sahara Desert..
173 – 12.14	22 March 2000	"The Real Dan"	The brothers try to find the real Dan the Van after meeting his double for meetings..
174 – 12.15	29 March 2000	"The Good, the Bad, and the Chuckles"	Paul and Big Jake have a showdown!

These episodes were originally twenty minutes long, however in 2004 the BBC edited them down to 15 minutes.

=== Series 13 (2000–2001) ===
#	Original Airdate	Title	Plot	Notes
175 – 13.1	19 December 2000	"Lollipop, Lollipop"	After the manager takes Paul‘s traffic lollipop, the brothers look for it in a textile factory..	First episode of ChuckleVision in widescreen
176 – 13.2	20 December 2000	"Dim Waiters"	When they learn that the groom is planning to marry just for the money, the brothers attempt to stop Dan the Van‘s niece from getting married..	
177 – 13.3	3 January 2001	"Wrong Number"	The brothers run a telephone company, but keep running into a mean engineer..	
178 – 13.4	10 January 2001	"Fowl Play"	The brothers attempt to stop Getoutofit stealing chickens..	
179 – 13.5	17 January 2001	"Prize Exhibits"	The brothers attempt to swap potatoes in a fruit and veg museum..	
180 – 13.6	24 January 2001	"Cousins at War"	The brothers challenge their cousins to a game of golf.	
181 – 13.7	31 January 2001	"Lets Get Quizzical"	After finding out that Barry knows a lot, Paul enters him into a quiz show..	
182 – 13.8	7 February 2001	"Knights to Remember"	The brothers attempt to retrieve the staff of Ronald off a dragon..	
183 – 13.9	14 February 2001	"Buzz Off"	The brothers attempt to find a shady businessman (that is, of course, if they find the right one!) , who wants to turn a castle into a theme park..	
184 – 13.10	21 February 2001	"Hairs Apparent"	The brothers run a barbershop..	
185 – 13.11	28 February 2001	"Grounds for Complaint"	The brothers have to run a veg shop, as well as a cricket ground!	
186 – 13.12	7 March 2001	"Lost and Floundering"	The brothers run a lost and found, and need to find Mr. Ramsbottom‘s scooter!	
187 – 13.13	14 March 2001	"Ghillie Me, Ghillie You"	The brothers attempt to become ghillies..	
188 – 13.14	21 March 2001	"Send in the Clones"	While stopping two thieves, Barry accidentally clones himself!	
189 – 13.15	28 March 2001	"Silence Is Golden"^	The brothers work at a hospital, where noise is strictly forbidden!	

^This episode is the only silent ChuckleVision episode in the entire series.
These episodes were originally twenty minutes long, however in 2005 the BBC edited them down to 15 minutes.

=== Series 14 (2002) ===
#	Original Airdate	Title	Plot
190 – 14.1	2 January 2002	"Safe and Sound"	The brothers have to put Dan the Van‘s Gran‘s ruby in a safe..
191 – 14.2	9 January 2002	"Trouble at Mill"	After losing Dan the Van‘s Gran‘s ruby, the brothers go to a place they remember..
192 – 14.3	16 January 2002	"Flat and Apartmental"	The Mill didn’t have the ruby, so the brothers look in Carrington Smythe‘s (pronounced Smith) flat..
193 – 14.4	23 January 2002	"On the Hoof"	Carrington Smythe (pronounced Smith) didn’t have it, so they get to MI7..
194 – 14.5	30 January 2002	"Out of This World"	After the brothers get chased by the instructor, they‘re tasked with finding Professor Rex Frimley..
195 – 14.6	6 February 2002	"All Clued Up"	After the Professor got kidnapped by Maddy, the brothers read his diary, and retrace his steps..
196 – 14.7	13 February 2002	"Chips That Pass in the Night"	The professor invented a chip for a weather machine, which needs Dan the Van‘s Gran‘s ruby to power it. They attempt to find the chip in a movie theater‘s ice cream tray..
197 – 14.8	20 February 2002	"Mission Implausible"	The brothers learn that MCC Ugly‘s medallion also powers the weather machine, but the life of a rapper is difficult, as the brothers learn..
198 – 14.9	27 February 2002	"Barry the Spider"	After Maddy stole all the components of the weather machine, the brothers go to the professor‘s lab, and whilst there, Paul switches Barry‘s brain with that of a cat and his body with that of a spider..
199 – 14.10	6 March 2002	"The Hidden Genius"	The brothers look for the professor in a shopping Centre (they also meet Maddy there)..
200 – 14.11	13 March 2002	"Run Robot Run"	After finding the professor, the brothers, alongside No Slacking, are chased by a robot..
201 – 14.12	20 March 2002	"Do As You Are Bid"	Dan the Van will give the brothers a decoy ruby, but only if they sell his antique lamp..
202 – 14.13	27 March 2002	"That Ol' Chuckle Magic"	Dan gives the brothers the decoy ruby, and they use it in their plan, but it backfires when both are lost!
203 – 14.14	3 April 2002	"The Men From the Monastery"	The brothers join the monastery, in hopes of finding Maddy..
204 – 14.15	10 April 2002	"A Change in the Weather"	It‘s a race against time as the brothers learn the ruby Dan gave (and Maddy has) was the real one, and have to stop her before she activates the weather machine!

==== 2002 Christmas Specials ====
#	Original Airdate	Title	Plot
205 – 15.1	24 December 2002	"Messy Xmas"	The brothers work for Santa, and meet a troublemaker elf!
206 – 15.2	24 December 2002	"Christmas Chuckle"	A twist on the "Christmas Carol" story by Charles Dickens..

These two episodes were supposed to be shown back to back as a double bill on Christmas Eve 2002. Due to a mix up, "Messy Xmas" was shown twice by mistake. The CBBC Channel later played the double bill with the episodes in the correct order.

=== Series 15 (2003) ===
#	Original Airdate	Title	Plot
207 – 15.3	3 January 2003	"Keeping It Under Wraps"	The brothers give hieroglyphics back to the museum curator, and need to protect Tutankamun‘s ank..
208 – 15.4	10 January 2003	"In A Class of Their Own"	The brothers return to their old school, but face cheating for the Pupil of the Century award..
209 – 15.5	17 January 2003	"Magnetic Distraction - Part One"	The brothers are followed by a plasma ball, and help Carrington Smythe (pronounced Smith) protect it..
210 – 15.6	24 January 2003	"Magnetic Distraction - Part Two"	The brothers are taken to a safe house, where one of the doctors wants Barry‘s powers as well..
211 – 15.7	31 January 2003	"Magnetic Distraction - Part Three"	Barry attempts to rescue the plasma ball, and Paul and Carrington Smythe (pronounced Smith), from Dr. Devonish..
212 – 15.8	7 February 2003	"On Your Pike"	The brothers try to send a dangerous fish back to where it was meant to be..
213 – 15.9	14 February 2003	"Bookshop Chuckles"	The location of a bookshop is also the location for a castle in Camelot..
214 – 15.10	21 February 2003	"Music of Time"	Paul finds a music box, which sends people back in age whenever played..
215 – 15.11	28 February 2003	"The Purple Pimple — Kidnap"	Robespierre is on the search for the Purple Pimple, and after Paul is welcome—kissed, he is mistaken for the Purple Pimple..
216 – 15.12	7 March 2003	"The Purple Pimple — Mutiny"	After stowing away on a ship, the brothers encounter a mutiny..
217 – 15.13	14 March 2003	"The Purple Pimple — Escape"	The brothers need to rescue the princess from Robespierre..
218 – 15.14	21 March 2003	"Storm in a Teashop"	While wanting service in their teashop, the brothers need to replace the regular workers..
219 – 15.15	28 March 2003	"War of the Hoses"	After being fired from No Slacking‘s hose business, the brothers start their own..

=== Series 16 (2004) ===
#	Original Airdate	Title	Plot
220 – 16.1	9 January 2004	"For Peat’s Sake"	After summoning a leprechaun, Peat causes trouble for Paul, who is setting a well for No Slacking..
221 – 16.2	16 January 2004	"No Getting Away"	The brothers are on a reality TV show, where they need to redecorate a house..
222 – 16.3	23 January 2004	"On the Verge"	The brothers start a food van.. unevenly..
223 – 16.4	30 January 2004	"Incredible Shrinking Barry – Part 1"	After an invention by Paul, Barry is shrunk to the size of a puppet, which leads to him being kidnapped..
224 – 16.5	6 February 2004	"Incredible Shrinking Barry – Part 2"	Paul attempts to rescue Barry from Getoutofit..
225 – 16.6	13 February 2004	"Which Witch Is Which?"	Barry thinks the nice lady catering for them is actually a witch!
226 – 16.7	20 February 2004	"Bedlam and Breakfast"	The brothers run another hotel, but only with one room!
227 – 16.8	27 February 2004	"Mocha Ado About Nothing"	After an incident with a coffee machine, the brothers are chased by the mafia..
228 – 16.9	5 March 2004	"The Return of the Purple Pimple"	The brothers need to rescue Sir Percy in time for his wedding..
229 – 16.10	12 March 2004	"The Whole Tooth"	Barry has a dentist‘s appointment, which ends up with him having a fly baby!
230 – 16.11	19 March 2004	"Cross Country Chuckles"	The brothers run a Cross—Country Marathon..
231 – 16.12	26 March 2004	"Can of Worms"	The brothers enter a worm—charming competition..
232 – 16.13	2 April 2004	"Bringing Home Dan"	The brothers need to get Dan the Van to a meeting, but keep running into what they think are his competitors..
233 – 16.14	16 April 2004	"Paul of the Ring"	Paul finds a magic ring whilst working in No Slacking‘s kitchen..
234 – 16.15	23 April 2004	"Sherlock Chuckle"	The brothers need to find a jewel thief..

=== Series 17 (2005) ===
#	Original Airdate	Title	Plot
235 – 17.1	6 January 2005	"Crocodile McChuckle"	The brothers need to help Douglas remember that he’s Scottish, not Australian..
236 – 17.2	13 January 2005	"A Job Well Done"	In a sequel of sorts to “No Getting Away”, the brothers need to fix everyday house problems..
237 – 17.3	20 January 2005	"Who’s Minding the Store?"	The brothers get back stock from someone which they think is stealing it..
238 – 17.4	27 January 2005	"Funny Money"	Bob Beans Chuckle wants money from Richie Chuckle. There’s just one problem: he’s already given it to the brothers!
239 – 17.5	3 February 2005	"The Chuckle and the Pea"	When a pea falls on the floor in Lettice the Van’s house, it’ll be a birthday the brothers won’t forget!
240 – 17.6	10 February 2005	"The Vengeful Viking"	Whilst taking a country walk, Paul accidentally wakes up Magnus the Viking, who leads him on a chase!
241 – 17.7	17 February 2005	"Grande Fromage"	The brothers try to catch a mouse in Monseiur Fromage’s cheese shop..
242 – 17.8	24 February 2005	"Pride and Prejudice"	After Paul goes cuckoo over walls, Barry tries to get to the roots to the situation..
243 – 17.9	3 March 2005	"Highway Robbery"	The brothers keep mistaking the highway woman for their friend, the Countess..
244 – 17.10	10 March 2005	"Smugglers"	The brothers have to smuggle some goods for No Slacking, without being caught by Getoutofit!
245 – 17.11	17 March 2005	"The Real Purple Pimple"	The gang have to save Sir Percy from Robespierre, and Paul has a plan..
246 – 17.12	24 March 2005	"The Lift"	When the brothers get stuck in a lift, it’s No Slacking’s worst nightmare!
247 – 17.13	31 March 2005	"The Diva"	The brothers become personal assistants to a pop star, and have to protect her on the red carpet..
248 – 17.14	7 April 2005	"Let Them Beat Cake"	After Paul gets framed, the brothers are on the case for the REAL cake smasher..
249 – 17.15	14 April 2005	"One’s Bitten, Two’s Shy"	After Barry accidentally gets bitten from Uncle Harry’s old teeth, he becomes a werefox. Which is bad timing, because Auntie Petal is hunting for, you guessed it, a werefox!

=== Series 18 (2006) ===
#	Original Airdate	Title	Plot
250 – 18.1	6 March 2006	"Barryella"	Barry meets a fairy godmother. Paul thinks he’s seeing things, but he has no time, he has to get ready for the ball!
251 – 18.2	7 March 2006	"Off the Cuff"	The brothers are chased by a construction worker, which would be easy, except for the fact that they’re chained together!
252 – 18.3	8 March 2006	"Skipshape"	The brothers are hired to look after a skip. Said skip keeps destroying No Slacking’s garden. Also going on: the brothers are going to a Rotherham game..
253 – 18.4	9 March 2006	"Don’t Lose Your Rag"	Paul enters Barry into another game show: this time, he can’t get upset..
254 – 18.5	10 March 2006	"Alien Antics"	After they steal the brother’s tomatoes, Paul and Barry chase after an alien on a U.F.O!
255 – 18.6	13 March 2006	"Sushi and Sumo"	With food poisoned wrestlers and important businessmen, Paul and Barry find it hard to run a sushi restaurant!
256 – 18.7	14 March 2006	"Oompah Oompah"	Paul and Barry are invited to Austria to judge a music festival. Piece of cake; that is, of course, if they weren’t threatened with death!
257 – 18.8	15 March 2006	"Pretty Polly"	The brothers need to quickly replace a parrot when the first one flies away!
258 – 18.9	16 March 2006	"Tennis Menace"	The brothers are competing in a tennis competition, so that the little old lady won’t get kicked out..
259 – 18.10	17 March 2006	"Hippy Isle"	The brothers are sent to an island full of hippies.. far out, dude!
260 – 18.11	20 March 2006	"Caterpillar Crisis"	The brothers think Mrs. Bradstock has a man-eating caterpillar somewhere in her house!
261 – 18.12	21 March 2006	"Chuck Bodgers"	The brothers, after being frozen for 3 billion years, have to stop Ping the Pitiful from destroying Earth!
262 – 18.13	22 March 2006	"The Picnic"	The brothers battle with Getoutofit for a good picnic spot..
263 – 18.14	23 March 2006	"Cable Fable"	The brothers are stuck in a cable car with a yeti and the angry driver!
264 – 18.15	24 March 2006	"In A Pickle"	The brothers battle against Worthington Knott for Old Mother Chuckle’s pickle recipe..

=== Series 19 (2007) ===
#	Original Airdate	Title	Plot
265 – 19.1	5 February 2007	"Et Tu Chuckle"	The brothers attempt to rescue Julius Caesar from being killed by Brutus..
266 – 19.2	6 February 2007	"Spook When You’re Spooken To"	Paul and Barry must convince some American ghosthunters that Dan the Van's mansion is haunted..
267 – 19.3	7 February 2007	"Big Break"	The brothers have to put a snooker table in the Viscount’s mansion..
268 – 19.4	8 February 2007	"Henry VIII and his 7th Chuckle"	Barry has to replace King Henry’s new wife when the original gets lost at sea..
269 – 19.5	9 February 2007	"Strictly Chuckle"	After the regular dancers get injured, Paul and Barry must take their place..
270 – 19.6	12 February 2007	"Sherwood Chuckle"	The brothers must rescue Robin Hood from the king..
271 – 19.7	13 February 2007	"Oil’s Well That Ends Well"	The brothers discover oil, and get prospectors to collect it. At the same time, Mr. Simms’ heating disappears. Could the two be connected?
272 – 19.8	14 February 2007	"In-Console-Able"	After getting an electric shock from a console, Barry is controlled by Paul playing the game..
273 – 19.9	15 February 2007	"Our Latest Model"	After an agency discovers Barry’s photo mishap, he’s all over the place, and Paul’s tired of it..
274 – 19.10	16 February 2007	"Tomorrow’s News"	The brothers discover a newspaper that’s supposed to come out the next day. Can they stop all the bad things that’ll happen?
275 – 19.11	19 February 2007	"Pandamonium"	After a panda escapes Mr Stubb’s zoo, Barry’s in disguise while Paul gets the real panda back..
276 – 19.12	20 February 2007	"A Case for the Chuckles"	The brothers think a crime film is actually happening next door, and unknowingly steal the man’s suitcase..
277 – 19.13	21 February 2007	"Driving Ambition"	The brothers compete against No Slacking in a golf competition
278 – 19.14	22 February 2007	"Muscling In"	Barry takes Dennis Ramsbottom’s place in the strong man competition
279 – 19.15	23 February 2007	"Hanging Round"	The brothers paint what they think is Captain Pillbury’s ship..

=== Series 20 (2008) ===
#	Original Airdate	Title	Plot
280 – 20.1	28 January 2008	"Mind Your Manors"	The brothers go back in time to retrieve a second chalice, since the first one was stolen by Simon Chortle..
281 – 20.2	29 January 2008	"I Scream Men"	Chuckle Ices compete against Slackino‘s to see who will stay and sell more ice cream..
282 – 20.3	30 January 2008	"Super Heroes, Super Zeroes"	The brothers set up a Beetleman convention. Besides the fact that Barry enjoys it and Paul doesn’t, they find a super—fan who doesn‘t take too kindly to them..
283 – 20.4	31 January 2008	"Jumping Jackpot"	It‘s a race against time as the brothers look for a lottery ticket..
284 – 20.5	1 February 2008	"Galloping Grandads"	The brothers take their grandparents‘ places, while No Slacking looks for the real ones..
285 – 20.6	4 February 2008	"Raven Mad"	The brothers make sure that the Crown Jewels are safely protected and the ravens stay at the tower, but need to face Daring Derek..

==== Christmas Special (2008) ====
#	Original Airdate	Title	Plot
286 – 20.7	21 December 2008	"The Mystery of Little Under Standing"	In a double—length special, the brothers need to catch a jewel thief on Christmas Eve..

=== Series 21 (2009) ===
#	Original Airdate	Title	Plot
287 – 21.1	11 December 2009	"Prank'd"	The brothers keep facing Kurt Kitchen on his show Prank‘d, and try to get their own back..
288 – 21.2	14 December 2009	"Top of The Cops"	The brothers want to win the Cadet of the Week award, but that might not happen if they‘re framed!
289 – 21.3	15 December 2009	"In a State Agents"	The brothers sell a new house to pop singer, Mandy. The problem: the house already belongs to Mr. Barker, their boss!
290 – 21.4	16 December 2009	"Cops and Jobbers"	The brothers, as plumbers, think MI7 are rival business, while MI7 think the brothers are working for their enemy!
291 – 21.5	17 December 2009	"Dishing up Trouble"	The brothers attempt to put up a satellite dish for No Slacking, but end up on TV themselves!
292 – 21.6	18 December 2009	"See How They Run"	The brothers complain over who really won the Fun Run trophy, which leads to childhood versions of themselves re-enact it..
