= Orlando Contreras =

Orlando Contreras may refer to:

- Orlando Contreras (singer) (1930–1994), Cuban singer
- Orlando Contreras (footballer) (born 1982), Peruvian football player
