= To Me, To You (Bruv) =

Single by Tinchy Stryder & the Chuckle Brothers
- Released: 23 October 2014
- Recorded: 2014
- Genre: British hip hop; comedy hip hop
- Length: 3:45
- Label: Cloud 9
- Songwriter(s): Kwasi Danquah III, Barry Elliot, Paul Elliot
- Producer(s): Dirty Danger

Tinchy Stryder singles chronology
"ESG" (2014)	"To Me, To You (Bruv)" (2014)	"Imperfection" (2015)

Music video
- "To Me, To You (Bruv)" on YouTube

"To Me, To You (Bruv)" is a 2014 charity single by Tinchy Stryder and the Chuckle Brothers. It was released on 23 October 2014 on Cloud 9 and was produced by longtime Tinchy Stryder affiliate Dirty Danger. The song was released in aid of the African-Caribbean Leukaemia Trust.

The song entered and peaked at number 92 on the UK Singles Chart.

== Background ==
Tinchy Stryder watched the Chuckle Brothers on television as a child and, after meeting the pair when recording an episode of Celebrity Juice, they struck up a rapport. Shortly after a video emerged online of the group in the studio together.

== Music video ==
A music video for the song was recorded by SB.TV and was set on a suburban British street reminiscent of a typical setting for the Chuckle Brother's popular ChuckleVision TV program. It featured Jamal Edwards, Dirty Danger, Tinchy Stryder and the Chuckle Brothers arguing over a ladder, playing ping pong and skanking in a comedic fashion.

== Chart performance ==
On 31 October 2014 the single entered and peaked at number 92 in the UK Singles Chart

== Charts ==
Chart (2014)	Peak position
UK Singles (Official Charts Company)	92
