= Gombo Salsa =

Studio album by Africando
- Released: 1996
- Genre: Salsa
- Label: Stern's Africa
- Producer: Ibrahima Sylla

Africando chronology
| Volume 2: Tierra Tradicional (1994) | Gombo Salsa (1996) | Baloba (1998) |

Gombo Salsa is an album by the African-Latin-American group Africando. It was released in 1996.

The group supported the album by playing Lincoln Center's "Expressiones Latinas" concert series.

== Production ==
The album was produced by Ibrahima Sylla. It was the group's first release to include Gnonnas Pedro. The songs were arranged by Boncana Maiga.

Africando covered Tabu Ley Rochereau's "Paquita"; Rochereau sang on the cover. Roger Marie Eugene and José Fajardo also contributed to the album.

== Critical reception ==
Professional ratings
Review scores
| Source | Rating |
|---|---|
| AllMusic | 4/5 stars |
| The Encyclopedia of Popular Music | 3/5 stars |
| MusicHound World: The Essential Album Guide | 4/5 stars |

The New York Times wrote: "Two songs with lead vocals by Sekouba Diabate, a jali from Guinea, use the unexpected leaps and modal scales of jali songs, but most of the album resembles classic salsa, discreet yet propulsive. The wild cards are the singers, who mostly follow Cuban and Puerto Rican models but also reveal the gentle, pleading tones of African lead tenors." The Gazette deemed it the third best "worldbeat" album of 1996, writing that the "tropical-dance-floor release ... has more salsa energy than your feet will ever need."

The Miami Herald concluded that, "while salsa in North America remains stuck in place, the music by Malian flutist and arranger Boncana Maiga echos tradition but nudges it forward... The best salsa of the '90s is African." The Star-Ledger lamented that "the band is so high-powered, the drumming and instrumental solos so hot, that the group, singing in the laid-back African style without the intensely rhythmic attack of Latin singers like Celia Cruz or Ruben Blades, are often overshadowed."

AllMusic called the album "an instant classic," writing that "the band continues to polish its radiant mixture of classic mambos, sones, boleros, and cha-chas."

== Track listing ==
| No. | Title | Length |
|---|---|---|
| 1. | "Gombo" |
| 2. | "Apolo" |
| 3. | "Diaraf" |
| 4. | "Musica en Vérité" |
| 5. | "Grog Moin" |
| 6. | "Paquita" |
| 7. | "Walo" |
| 8. | "Colombia, mi Corazon" |
| 9. | "Mborin" |
| 10. | "Dagamasi" |
| 11. | "Maral" |
| 12. | "Sakhar" |
