= ChuckleVision =

BBC television series

- ChuckleVision title card (series 3 to 21)
- Genre: Physical comedy
- Created by: The Chuckle Brothers
- Written by: John Sayle; Rory Clark; Chuckle Brothers and others
- Directed by: Martin Hughes, et al.
- Starring: The Chuckle Brothers
- Theme music composer: Dave Cooke
- Opening theme: "ChuckleVision"
- Composer: Dave Cooke
- Country of origin: United Kingdom
- Original language: English
- No. of series: 21
- No. of episodes: 294 (list of episodes)

Production
- Producer: Martin Hughes
- Production locations: Rotherham, England (series 3–21)
- Running time: 20 minutes (1987–1989, 1991–2001); 15 minutes (1989–1990, 2002–2009); 30 minutes (2008)
- Production company: BBC

Original release
- Network: BBC One (1987–2009); CBBC (2002–2009)
- Release: 26 September 1987 – 18 December 2009

Related
- To Me... To You... (1996–1998); Chuckle Time (2018)

ChuckleVision is a British children's comedy television series created by Martin Hughes and the Chuckle Brothers for the BBC. It starred Barry and Paul Elliott as the Chuckle Brothers and occasionally their older brothers, Jimmy, and Brian Elliott (known professionally as the Patton Brothers).

It aired to critical acclaim and notoriety becoming widely known among a large span of generations for their Yorkshire humour and catchphrases such as "To me, to you" and "Oh dear, oh dear". It ran for 294 episodes over twenty-two years from 1987 to 2009.

In January 2018 it was voted as one of the greatest children's TV shows of all time by a Radio Times panel of experts. Further in August 2019, it was voted the best CBBC show of all time by readers of Radio Times.

== Plot ==
Episodes of ChuckleVision were usually independent, with the basic plot for each involving the brothers undertaking a job, task or adventure. They were often employed by a character known as "No Slacking", who, despite appearing as a different character in every episode, was always known by this name because of his catchphrase ("And remember, No Slacking!"). The character was always inconvenienced by Paul and Barry and was played by the brothers' real-life elder sibling, Jimmy Patton. Jimmy was part of a comedy act with his brother Brian, who also appeared in various episodes, mostly playing a villain with the catchphrase "Getoutofit!". A large amount of the comedy is slapstick.

The duo also carried out work for "Dan the Van", who was never seen on screen, apart from a single episode where the Chuckle Brothers take it upon themselves to make sure he arrives to a special meeting. Dan's face cannot be seen as he is completely covered in bandages and is wearing dark glasses. Relatives of Dan the Van are sometimes seen or referred to, such as his grandmother, Lettuce the Van.

There are often references to Rotherham United football club as the brothers support the club in the TV show and the actors support them in real life too.

In the first two series (1987–1989), each episode focused on a certain topic, in the style of Blue Peter. These episodes had rarely been available since their original transmission, until the series was released onto DVD in Autumn 2011. Both series featured a segment called "Armchair Theatre" where Billy Butler would tell a story to the viewers. The first series also featured magician Simon Lovell performing a trick.

The brothers' main mode of transport was "The Chuckmobile", a quadracycle with a red-and-white striped roof. Barry was usually the driver, whilst Paul put his feet up on the front bar. Paul only pedalled the bike very occasionally throughout the entire series. The registration plate of the bike is CHUCKLE 1. In 2018, 'The Chuckmobile' was bought by entertainments company InTo Entertain, who now hire out the bike for events such as weddings, festivals and quirky occasions with the brand name 'Chuckle Your Vision'.

An exception to the usual format of stand-alone episodes came with Series 14, broadcast in 2002. The series employed a continuous storyline throughout each episode, involving the brothers' hunt for a missing ruby. They continued a similar trend in the next two series, with two 3-part stories in Series 15, entitled "The Purple Pimple" and "Magnetic Distraction". A two part story called "Incredible Shrinking Barry" appears in Series 16. From Series 17, this trend was not repeated.

== Characters ==
- Paul Chuckle (played by Paul Elliott)
- Barry Chuckle (played by Barry Elliott)
- No Slacking (played by Jimmy Patton, series 3–21)
- Get Out Of It (played by Brian Patton, series 7–20)

Paul is the dominant sibling of the two and often due to his blind confidence the two end up in bother. When Paul realises he has made a mistake, he often blames Barry and tends to make Barry do the work whilst taking the credit for himself. Neither brother is particularly bright.

Paul and Barry both possess Northern English accents and have a number of catchphrases, some of which involve one brother replying to the other brother's line. Thus "To me" receives the reply "To you", and "Silly me" is met with "Silly you". The line "Oh dear" is regularly followed by "Oh dear, oh dear", and sometimes by "Oh dear, oh dear, oh dear" when something goes wrong.

There are often references made to Rotherham United F.C., whom the brothers support in real life. In "Football Heroes", Paul and Barry play for Rotherham after a mix-up with two former players of the club, Paul scores an own goal and thinking it was a genuine goal, celebrates with Barry.

== Production and broadcast ==
The main writer throughout the series' run was John Sayle, who wrote most of the episodes in each series. Episodes have also been written by Russell T Davies and The Chuckle Brothers themselves. From Series 14 onwards, the run time of each episode was reduced from twenty minutes to fifteen. Series 12 and 13 were also re-edited to match the new run times.

For the first 7 series, the programme was shown on Saturday mornings with series often on at 8:40am for the first three and then 8:15am in later years before each series having a repeat run on afternoons on CBBC a few months later. From series 8 (starting in December 1995) new episodes of series was broadcast on the afternoon slot which remained for much of the series run.

From Series 14 onwards, outtakes were shown during the credits of each episode.

For Series 4, a new theme arrangement was produced by Dave Cooke. This remained from then on, but was shortened from Series 17.

From Series 13 onwards, all episodes were shot in widescreen.

The series ended its 22-year run at the end of 2009, due to dropped ratings and less interest by the BBC, with the final series airing in December of that year. Repeats occurred regularly until the end of 2012. The 2008 Christmas Special became the last episode to be broadcast on CBBC, being shown on Christmas Day 2013.

Following the death of Barry Elliot in 2018, all six episodes of the final series were made available on BBC iPlayer.

The Series 12 episode 'No Pets Allowed' was repeated on BBC Four on 11 December 2022, as part of a season of repeats of classic children's programmes for the BBC's 100th anniversary.

== Awards ==
On 9 December 2018, ChuckleVision received its first award, Special Recognition at the I Talk Telly Awards. The award was the only one to be decided by Founder Elliot Gonzalez, rather than the public.

Paul reacted to the news on Twitter, stating "After 292 episodes spanning 22 years this is the first time EVER that ChuckleVision has been recognised for an award so thank you @elliot_gonzalez and italktelly.com".

== Commercial release ==
=== TV series ===
DVD title	Discs	Year	Ep. no.	DVD releases	Notes
DVD title	Discs	Year	Ep. no.	Region 2	Notes
The Complete Series 1	4	1987–1988	13	24 October 2011/ 25 July 2016	Includes Christmas Special
The Complete Series 2	4	1988–1989	13	29 October 2012/ 29 August 2016	
The Complete Series 3	1	1989–1990	13	17 April 2017	

A BBC VHS was released in April 1993 entitled "Goofy Golfers" which featured three episodes from the fourth series, however it is now out of production. In 2011 and 2012, Delta Music released two DVD box sets of the first two series. These were re-released in 2016 alongside series 3, which was released for the first time onto DVD by Simply Media.

=== Music ===
In 2014, composer Dave Cooke released 'Volume 1' of ChuckleVision soundtracks and music cues as a digital download. Five more volumes, 2, 3, 4, 5 and 6 have since been released.

=== Stage productions ===
There have been four DVD releases of the brothers on stage: Pirates of the River Rother, Spooky Goings On, Indiana Chuckles and the Kingdom of the Mythical Sulk and The Chuckle Brothers in Trouble. All these feature live performances of the brothers, one filmed at Blackpool, one at Scarborough, one at Darlington, and the other at York. The Chuckle Brothers in Trouble DVD filmed at York was a "rehearsal" performance. There is also a box set of Pirates of the River Rother and Spooky Goings On, released in 2008.
