= Amadou Balaké =

- Born: Amadou Traoré; March 8, 1944; Ouahigouya, Burkina Faso
- Died: August 27, 2014 (aged 70) Ouagadougou, Burkina Faso
- Genres: Mande music, Mossi music, son cubano, salsa
- Occupations: Musician, songwriter, bandleader
- Instrument: Vocals
- Years active: 1962-2014
- Labels: Volta Discobel, Sacodis, Disques CVD, Sterns
- Formerly of: Horoya Band, Harmonie Voltaïque, Super Volta, Les 5 Consuls, Africando

Amadou Traoré (March 8, 1944 – August 27, 2014), better known as Amadou Balaké, was a popular singer from Burkina Faso. During his career, which lasted over 50 years, Balaké recorded and performed in different parts of West Africa as well as New York and Paris. In the early 21st century, he was a member of Senegalese salsa band Africando. His music combined different traditions from his home country, primarily Dioula (Mandé) and Mossi, as well as Afro-Cuban music.

== Life and career ==
Amadou Traoré was born on March 8, 1944, in Ouahigouya, Yatenga, then a French territory. In 1952, his recently widowed mother moved to the capital, Ouagadougou, where he became interested in music. He spent six years working with his brother as a driver apprentice in Mopti, Mali, before returning to Ouagadougou in 1961 to work as a taxi driver. In 1962 he began his professional career, playing in different orchestras in Bamako, Abidjan, Kankan and Conakry throughout the decade. He joined Ouagadougou-based band Harmonie Voltaïque and scored a hit with his song "Balaké" ("porcupine" in Mandinka), changing his name to Amadou Balaké. He then became the singer for the Super Volta orchestra, and in 1970 he formed the band Amadou Balaké and the 5 Consuls before recording his first album as a leader in the mid 1970s.

In 1979 Balaké travelled with Gambian singer Laba Sosseh to New York, where he recorded two albums: À New York and Afro-Charanga, the latter featuring pianist Alfredo Rodríguez. In 1982, his single "Taximan n'est pas gentil" earned him a golden record in Ivory Coast. In the 1980s he travelled to Abidjan and Paris, where he continued performing.

In the year 2000, Balaké was invited by producer Ibrahima Sylla to join Senegalese salsa band Africando as a guest vocalist in their album Mandali. He later became an official member of the band, performing in subsequent albums.

Balaké died on August 27, 2014, in Ouagadougou. His last album, recorded in 2013, was released posthumously by Sterns Music in 2015.

== Style ==
Balaké's music has been described as "delightfully varied", combining traditions such as the warba dance music of Burkina Faso, modern Mandé music, Cuban son montuno, and salsa. Balaké primarily sang in Dioula, French, and occasionally in Mossi. His approach to Mandé music has been compared to that of the Rail Band and Bembeya Jazz.

== Discography ==
Solo albums

- 1975: Traoré Amadou dit Ballaké et ses Dieux (CVD)
- 1978: Taximen (Sacodis)
- 1978: Bar Konon Mousso Bar (Sacodis)
- 1979: Vol. 3 (Sacodis)
- 1979: Amadou Balaké à New York (Sacodis)
- 1981: Afro-Charanga (Zamidou)
- 1987: Amadou Balaké à Paris (Sacodis)
- 2003: Natoma (Seydoni)
- 2015: In Conclusion (Sterns)

Compilations

- 2008: Señor ecléctico (Oriki)

With Africando

- 2000: Mandali (Sterns)
- 2003: Martina (Sterns)
- 2006: Ketukuba (Sterns)
- 2013: Viva Africando (Sterns)
