= Orquesta Broadway =

- Origin: New York City, New York, United States
- Genres: cuban music
- Years active: 1962–present

Orquesta Broadway is a New York-based charanga (cuban music) band formed in 1962 by flautist Eddy Zervigón and his brothers Kelvin Zervigón (piano) and Rudy Zervigón (violin) and Rafael Felo Barrio (musician) (singer).They issued 20 albums and various recordings between 1964 and 2003.

Orquesta Broadway and Típica Novel are two popular New York latin music bands that continue to perform in the charanga format.

Some of the famous musicians initially involved were Monguito "El Único", a Cuban nasal-voiced singer (he patterned his vocal style on the Cuban sonero Miguelito Cuní), joined in 1962, when he moved to New York from Mexico, Ronnie Baro, 1992, co-founder of Africando and Roger Dawson, conga drummer (bongos are not typically used in charanga bands).

Their song "El Barrio del Pilar" is considered a type song for the 'marcha' rhythm of the conga drums in cuban music.

== Discography ==
=== Records ===
- Dengue (1963, Gema Records)
- Broadway Orchestra (unknown, Gema Records)
- A Descargar Con La Orquesta Broadway (unknown, Gema Records)
- Arrimate Pa' Aca (Come Close To Me) (1965, Musicor Records)
- Tiqui, Tiqui (1966, Musicor Records)
- Todas Bailan Con La Orquesta Broadway (1967, Musicor Records)
- Pruebalo Mi Amor: Try It Out, My Love (1968, Tico Records)
- Orquesta Broadway – Do Their Thing (1968, Musicor Records)
- Yo Quiero Ser Tu Juguete (1970, Musicor Records)
- Como Me Gusta! (1972, All-Art Records)
- African Soul / Alma Africana (1973, All-Art Records)
- Està Pegando (1974, All-Art Records)
- Salvaje (1975, Coco Records)
- Pasaporte (1976, Coco Records)
- New York City Salsa (1978, Coco Records)
- Paraiso (Paradise) (1981, Coco Records)
- Roberto Torres Con La Orquesta Broadway – Lo Mejor De Roberto Torres Con La Original Orquesta Broadway (1981, Westside Latino Records)
- Orquesta Broadway – Loves New York (1982, Broadway Records)
- Ahora Es Cuando Eh! (1987, Discos Perla)
- Orquesta Broadway – 40th. Anniversary (2003, Flauta Records)
