= Eddy Zervigon =

Cuban musician (born 1940)

Eddy Zervigon (born 7 July 1940) is a Cuban flautist and bandleader. He was born in Güines, Cuba but moved to the United States in 1962, where he founded the charanga band Orquesta Broadway with his brothers Rudy and Kelvin. The lead singer was Roberto Torres. A very successful band, Orquesta Broadway toured Africa and Europe.
