= To Me... To You... =

British TV show

- Genre: Children's game show
- Presented by: Chuckle Brothers
- Country of origin: United Kingdom
- Original language: English
- No. of series: 3
- No. of episodes: 41 (inc. 2 Christmas specials)

Production
- Running time: 25 minutes

Original release
- Network: BBC1
- Release: 21 June 1996 – 25 December 1998

To Me... To You... is a British children's game show created for the BBC, which ran for three series between 21 June 1996 to 25 December 1998. The programme was presented by comedians Barry and Paul Elliott in their roles as the Chuckle Brothers and focused on two pairs of young children competing for prizes and taking part in various mini-games during the course of an episode. In addition to the presenters, the programme also included a series of celebrities, many involved in children's television during that period.

== Format ==
As a children's game show, the programme is set on a fictional tropical island known as Chuckle Island, owned by the Chuckle Brothers. In each episode, two teams of two children compete against each other to win as many prizes offered by the programme. After playing a game to decide who begins first, each team takes it in turns to roll a dice and move a trolley carrying a set of prizes on it across a large board of 17 spaces consisting of a start space where the teams begin, a home space for each team, and a series of special spaces. The goal of the game is for a team to move the trolley onto their respective home space to claim the prizes on it – including those earned from correctly answering questions on prize spaces – whereupon the trolley is reset to the start with a new set of prizes. On each team's turn, one contestant rolls a die, which determines how many spaces the trolley is moved and whether is towards or away from their home space – if a team lands on a double space, their opponents' roll is doubled.

At times, the teams undertake special games via a randomizer system that becomes active for the team in control either when they land on a "?" space or at specific points in the episode. In these games, the team playing the game must complete a challenge to win a coconut – which they can also earn from prize spaces – with some games featuring a special celebrity guest that have been involved in children's television at the time of broadcast – these have included Richard McCourt (better known as "Dick" of Dick and Dom), Mark Speight, Dave Benson-Phillips, Paul Zerdin, Michaela Strachan, Dave Chapman better known as "Otis the Aardvark" Mr Blobby and Chris Jarvis. One episode had Terrence Hardiman as The Demon Headmaster and another had Jimmy Patton as No Slacking. The game ends after a ferry horn sounds, at which points the teams earn the prizes they won, with the team having the most coconuts at the end earning a special prize from that episode's celebrity guest.

== Transmissions ==
=== Series ===
Series	Start date	End date	Episodes
1	21 June 1996	13 September 1996	13
2	27 June 1997	19 September 1997	13
3	8 April 1998	15 July 1998	13

=== Christmas Specials ===
Date
23 December 1997
25 December 1998
