= Alfredo Rodríguez =

Cuban pianist (1936–2005)

- Born: October 25, 1936; Havana, Cuba
- Died: October 3, 2005 (aged 68) Paris, France
- Genres: Afro-Cuban jazz, descarga, son cubano, bolero, danzón
- Occupations: Musician, bandleader
- Instruments: Piano, vocals
- Years active: 1961–2005
- Labels: Espérance, Caimán, Hannibal, Bleu Caraïbes

Alfredo Rodríguez (25 October 1936 – 3 October 2005) was a Cuban pianist who played Afro-Cuban music as well as Latin jazz. Born in Havana, his musical career began in New York, where he struggled to establish himself, playing with dozens of Latin music groups over two decades. In 1983, he moved to Paris, where he enjoyed greater success, recording several albums as a leader to critical acclaim. In his later years, he founded a new group, los Acerekó, featuring Tata Güines, Changuito and Joel Hierrezuelo among others.

Rodríguez is remembered for his collaborations with Carlos "Patato" Valdés, his tenure with Jesús Alemañy's Cubanismo and for his distinctly Afro-Cuban playing style, reflecting the legacy of Peruchín and Lilí Martínez. Although never commercially successful, his work has been consistently well received by critics and Latin jazz fans alike. His death in 2005 occurred shortly after he had finished recording a collaboration album with Africando.

== Life and career ==
=== Early years ===
Alfredo Rodríguez was born in Vedado, Havana, on 25 October 1936. Although he studied music at the Eduardo Peyrellade Conservatory, he did not begin his career as a musician until after he had moved to Manhattan in 1960. He initially worked as a PR officer for a printing company. In 1961, Arsenio Rodríguez, one of Cuba's most popular musicians, advised him to pursue a career in music. In the next decade he would play with dozens of groups, finding it hard to establish himself as the core member of any orchestra due to his personal convictions and rivalries with other musicians. He played with Conjunto Sensación under the direction of Rey Roig, making his recording debut on Swing (1965). Unlike the other members of the band, such as singer Pete "El Conde" Rodríguez, Alfredo refused to join Johnny Pacheco's band after the break-up of the group in 1966.

After the dissolution of Conjunto Sensación, Rodríguez played Vicentico Valdés before joining Willie Rosario's group for one year. In 1968, he joined Joe Cuba's group for two years. At this point, he quit his job in the printing company, which he had maintained for seven years. In 1970, after a brief and difficult spell in Las Vegas, he returned to New York and rejoined Joe Cuba's band.

=== Miami and return to New York ===
In 1972, Rodríguez moved to Miami, where he stayed for four years as a member of José Fajardo's group and also as a live accompanist for singers such as Lucecita Benítez, Vicentico Valdés (again), and Orlando Contreras. He returned to New York in 1976, and was invited by percussionist Carlos "Patato" Valdés to play on his new album, Ready for Freddie, released by Latin Percussion. He then played with Charanga 76 for two years, and recorded many albums as a side man, including three with his favorite singer, Justo Betancourt. He also recorded with Típica Novel, Alfredo de la Fé, Ismael Rivera, Cortijo, La Lupe and Celia Cruz, among others.

In 1980, Rodríguez replaced Jorge Dalto in Tito Puente's Latin Percussion Jazz Ensemble for an American tour, since Dalto was touring Europe at the time. In 1980, he also toured Europe with Camilo Azuquita, who had relocated to Paris in 1978. Nonetheless, it was not a fruitful tour. He returned to New York and substituted for Óscar Hernández and Sonny Bravo on many recording sessions.

=== The Paris years ===
In 1982, he went to Paris with flautist Art Webb due to the last-minute withdrawal of pianist Edy Martínez. He stayed there with Patato Valdés and began to work with his own group. In 1983, he recorded his first album in New York with his former bandmates: Sonido sólido. His second LP, Monsieur oh la la, was recorded in 1985. In 1990–91, he recorded his third album, this time live while on tour with Patato: Cuba-New York-Paris. The album saw limited release by the French record label Bleu Caraibes. In 1993, he recorded Para Yoya, also released by Bleu Caraibes, featuring Peruchín Jr., the guitarist, son of Peruchín.

Between 1994 and 1995, he invited Cuban artists from New York, such as Roberto Torres and Papaíto, for live shows in Paris, where the Latin scene was growing. In 1995, he recorded the first album by Cubanismo, Jesús Alemañy's big band son revival project. The album was recorded in Havana, marking the first time Rodríguez had returned to his home country since 1960. Also in 1995, he recorded Único y diferente with Patato Valdés.

In 1996, he returned to Cuba to record Cuba linda, his most critically acclaimed album, featuring some of the musicians from Cubanismo. He then toured California with Cubanismo to a great reception by audiences and critics. In Charleston, he played Cuba linda, although with a different lineup compared to the album sessions. He then toured Europe with Cubanismo; that would be his last tour with the band, which he quit after the release of Malembe.

=== Later years and death ===
In the year 2000 he took part in the recordings for the album Los originales, by Cuban Masters, an ensemble of Cubans in exile directed by Juan Pablo Torres. The album was nominated for two Grammy Awards. In the early 2000s, he formed his own group called Acerekó and recorded the album Cuban Jazz, featuring Tata Güines, Changuito, Bobby Carcassés and Joel Hierrezuelo. His last project was the Africando album Ketukuba, released in 2006. He gave his last concert in August 2005 in Contis, France. He died from cancer at the Bretonneau Hospital in Paris on 3 October 2005.

A tribute concert was held in Paris on 20 March 2006. Pianist Ernán Lopez-Nussa flew over from Havana to play on the show, which was presented by Joel Hierrezuelo.

A compilation of unreleased recordings, Oye Afra, was released posthumously in 2007.

== Style ==
With regards to his Afro-Cuban style of piano playing, Rodríguez is considered a disciple of Peruchín, who was a good friend of his. He also was a fan of Lilí Martínez, who played for Arsenio Rodríguez. Both Peruchín and Lilí Martínez were influenced by classical pianists such as Chopin, and so was Rodríguez, whose music owes much to classical composers such as Debussy and Rachmaninoff.

== Discography ==
- 1983: Sonido sólido
- 1985: Monsieur oh la la
- 1991: Cuba-New York-Paris (live)
- 1993: Para Yoya
- 1997: Cuba linda
- 2002: Cuban Jazz
- 2007: Oye Afra (live, recorded 1998–2005)
- 2014: On Tour in Europe (live, recorded 1990–91)
