= Chuckle Brothers =

English children's entertainers

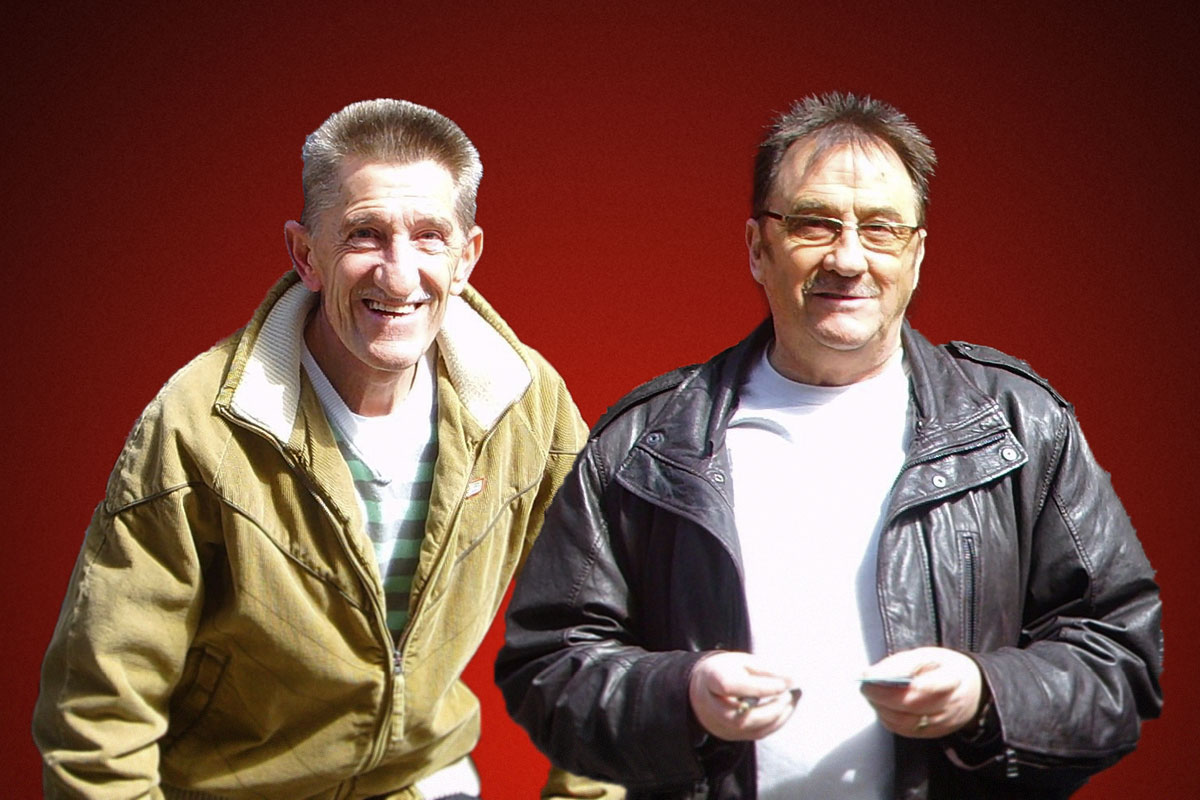
- Barry (left) and Paul in 2008
- Born: Barry: Barry David Elliott; 24 December 1944; Rotherham, West Riding of Yorkshire, England Paul: Paul Harman Elliott; 18 October 1947 (age 79); Rotherham, West Riding of Yorkshire, England
- Died: Barry: 5 August 2018 (aged 73); Rotherham, South Yorkshire, England
- Notable work: The ChuckleHounds (1985–1986); ChuckleVision (1987–2009); To Me... To You... (1996–1998); Chuckle Time (2018)
- Spouse(s): Paul: Sue (m. 1988) Barry: Anne (m. 1973)
- Relatives: Patton Brothers (brothers); Pete and Sophie Sandiford (nephew and niece)

Comedy career
- Years active: Barry: 1963–2018; Paul: 1963–present
- Medium: Television; stage
- Genres: Slapstick; Parody; Word play

The Chuckle Brothers were an English comedy double act comprising real-life brothers Barry David Elliott (24 December 1944 – 5 August 2018) and Paul Harman Elliott MBE (born 18 October 1947). They were known for their BBC children's programme ChuckleVision, which aired from 1987 to 2009 and celebrated its twenty-first series with a 2010 stage tour titled An Audience with the Chuckle Brothers. The comedy of the Chuckle Brothers usually derived from slapstick, other visual gags, and wordplay, and their catchphrases included "To me, to you!" and "Oh dear, oh dear!"

== Early life ==
The brothers were born in Rotherham to Amy and James Patton Elliott, in 1944 and 1947. Their father was a Gang Show performer whose stage name was Gene Patton; he worked with the 18-year-old Peter Sellers in 1943 in The No. 10 Gang and gave performances in London, Orkney and the Hebrides, Iceland, the Far East, India, and Burma. Their two older brothers, Jimmy and Brian, were known professionally as the Patton Brothers until Jimmy's death in 2019. The Patton Brothers appeared in ChuckleVision, Jimmy as the nameless character known colloquially as "No Slacking", and Brian as another unnamed character known as "Getoutofit".

The Chuckle Brothers gained wider attention as a support act for the Welsh singer Dorothy Squires.

== Career ==
=== Television ===
After working as Butlins Redcoats in 1966, the Chuckle Brothers – performing as The Harman Brothers – won the television talent show Opportunity Knocks in 1967, followed by success on New Faces in 1974. The brothers began their television careers as a double act, making their debut in April 1979 on the BBC comedy series Lennie and Jerry, hosted by Lennie Bennett and Jerry Stevens. They made two appearances on the game show 3-2-1, hosted by Ted Rogers, in January 1980 and April 1982, and appeared on the long-running BBC programme, The Good Old Days, in June 1980. In August 1983, the Brothers appeared on The Freddie Starr Showcase alongside the comedian Freddie Starr.

Their primary work was mainly focused on children's television, beginning initially on Christmas Day in 1980 with their taking part in a televised children's show, A Merry Morning, in which the brothers entertained around 250 children from the Leeds area in Yeadon Town Hall.

In 1985, the brothers launched a pre-school programme on the BBC entitled The ChuckleHounds, in which they performed routines with no dialogue, while dressed up in giant dog costumes. Their success in children's television came in 1987, with the launch of their iconic children's show, ChuckleVision, in which their real-life siblings Jimmy and Brian Patton made occasional appearances. The show proved a ratings hit with children, running for 21 series over a period of 22 years, and giving them a Special Award for Lifetime Achievement at the British Academy Children's Awards in 2008. The final series of the programme was aired in December 2009.

The two contributed further to children's entertainment, performing at the Children's Royal Variety Performance in May 1992, and launching a children's game show titled To Me... To You..., which ran between 1996 and 1998 and which took its name from their signature catchphrase.

Outside of children's entertainment, the brothers have made appearances in many other television series, both together and separately. In May 2008, they appeared in the BBC documentary series Comedy Map of Britain, and won the 2010 series of Celebrity Coach Trip. In November 2011, the brothers starred in a series of TV advertisements for the UK-based van insurance comparison website Van Compare.com In October 2012, they appeared on Comedy World Cup on Channel 4, while on 15 March 2013, they were featured in David Walliams' sketch for Comic Relief. From 2013 to 2014, Barry made a number of appearances in the BBC comedy series Still Open All Hours as dog owner Mr Marshall, first appearing in the role for the 2013 Christmas special. On 13 March 2015, they appeared again on Comic Relief, this time in a sketch based around National Treasures. The duo appeared at the 2016 Royal Variety Performance, performing sketches with host David Walliams. In April 2018, it was announced the brothers were in the process of recording a new clip show for Channel 5, entitled Chuckle Time; It ran for one series during the summer of that year, although it was cut short following the death of Barry Elliott in August 2018.

=== Stage ===
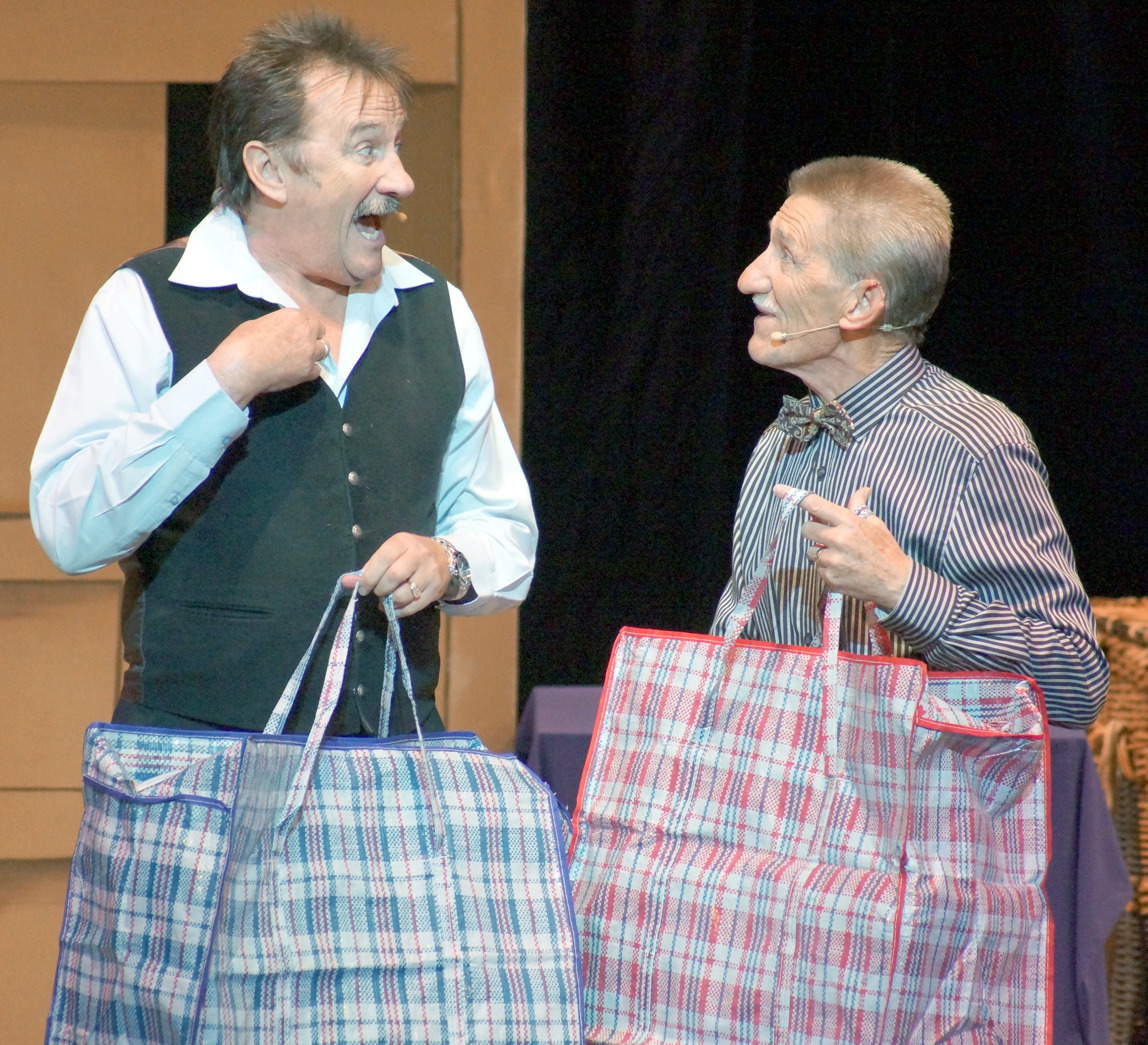
Paul and Barry Elliott, aka The Chuckle Brothers, on stage at the Futurist Theatre in Scarborough in 2013

As well as regular TV appearances, Paul and Barry appeared on stage in venues across the UK. Their annual nationwide tours often included them performing with The Patton Brothers, magic duo Safire, The Magic Light Puppet Company as well a full cast. Their comedy and parody shows have included The Blackpool Tower Circus (1974, 1987), To You To Me (1995), The Chuckle Brothers in Trouble (1996), The Chuckle Brothers Summer Roadshow (1997), The Adventures of The Chuckle Brothers (1998), The Chuckle Brothers Trouble At Sea (1999), The New Adventures of The Chuckle Brothers (2000), Spooky Goings On (2001), Raiders of the Lost Bark (2002), Star Doors – The Chuckle Brothers Strike Back (2003), Barry Potty and his Smarter Brother Paul in The Chamber of Horrors (2004), Pirates of the River Rother (2005), Doctor What and the Return of the Garlics (2006), Spooky Goings on 2 (2007), Aladdin (Christmas 2007), Indiana Chuckles and the Kingdom of the Mythical Sulk (2008), Chuckle Trek – The Lost Generation (2009), A Christmas Chuckle (Christmas 2009), An Audience With....The Chuckle Brothers (2010), The Twelve Days of Christmas (Christmas 2010), Barry Potty and his Full Blood Brother Paul in the Ghostly Shadows (2011), The Return of the Pirates of the River Rother 2: In Strangers Tights (2012), The Chuckle Brothers meet the Phantom at the Theatre (2013), A 2014 Space Oddity (2014) and The Chuckles of Oz (2015).

Live recordings of Pirates of the River Rother and Spooky Goings On 2 were released on DVD 2007, the latter under the title The Chuckle Brothers – Spooky Goings On Live! A box set of the two was also made available. A dress rehearsal of the duo's 1996 tour The Chuckle Brothers in Trouble was released on DVD in 2008. In addition, the brothers' 2008 tour, Indiana Chuckles and The Kingdom of the Mythical Sulk, set in Ancient Egypt, was released on DVD later that year.

The brothers toured theatres annually with their shows until 2015. Although, they performed regularly in pantomimes, festivals, events and holiday parks until Barry's death in 2018.

During their career, Paul and Barry performed in 51 pantomimes together. Their first was Babes in the Wood, which they performed as The Harman Brothers in Malvern in 1967 opposite Sandy Powell. Their final pantomime together was Snow White and the Seven Dwarfs at the Mayflower Theatre, Southampton, which they appeared in 2017 opposite Craig Revel Horwood. They were awarded a Great British Pantomime Award for Best Double Act for this production.

Since Barry's death, Paul has stated his intention to continue to appear in pantomime productions and continued to do so from 2018 until 2025.

In December 2026, Paul will make his debut at the Royal National Theatre, London in the Dorfman Theatre as Mr Boo in a revival of Jim Cartwright's The Rise and Fall of Little Voice opposite Francesca Mills and Jill Halfpenny, before touring the UK in February 2027. From September 2027, he will appear as Monsignor O’Hara in the UK and Ireland tour of the musical Sister Act opposite Craig Revel Horwood and Zoe Birkett.

=== Other appearances ===
In 2010, the Chuckle Brothers won the first Celebrity Coach Trip.

From 2014 until 2018, the brothers made appearances at various nightclubs and student events, performing sets and posing for photographs. After Barry's death, Paul stated that he would continue with these appearances.

In March 2016, the brothers appeared in a promotional video for the computer game Hitman.

In 2017, both brothers appeared in The Funniest Man in the World, a short film directed by Jon Conway about Joseph Grimaldi, played by Barry.

Following Barry's death, Paul has appeared in a number of quiz shows for charity, including Pointless Celebrities, Tenable All Stars and Celebrity Mastermind.

=== Music ===
In October 1995, the Chuckle Brothers released an album entitled To You to Me featuring eleven tracks. Many of the tracks were based on their catchphrases, such as "To me, to you" and "Silly You, Silly Me".

In October 2014, the Chuckle Brothers collaborated with Tinchy Stryder to release a charity single "To Me, To You (Bruv)" to raise funds for the African Caribbean Leukaemia Trust.

In September 2015, the Brothers performed for twenty minutes at the music festival Bestival, citing it as the biggest crowd they had ever performed in front of.

=== Mobile game ===
In July 2016, the Chuckle Brothers released their first mobile app for Android and iOS titled "Chuckle World". It was a quiz game with Tinder style sliding mechanics and endless style mobile gameplay.

== Critical reception ==
In November 2005, Jacques Peretti, a reporter for The Guardian, remarked "The appeal of the Chuckle Brothers remains a mystery to anyone over eight, but to anyone under eight, they're the ultimate entertainment experience. The little people think they're hilarious, and if you add up all the little people across the country who think they're hilarious, you'd think it's ChuckleVision that should have the 28 comedy gongs, not Little Britain or The Office."

On 31 January 2007, Rotherham United chairman Denis Coleman announced that the brothers had both been made honorary presidents of the football club.

In 2008, they were honoured with the Special Award at the British Academy Children's Awards.

== Personal life ==
The brothers regularly appeared at events and openings, an example being the unveiling of the Tropical Butterfly House, Wildlife and Falconry Centre in North Anston in South Yorkshire in July 2013, which Barry attended. Supporters of Rotherham United Football Club, they were made Honorary Life Presidents of the club in 2007.

Both brothers have been married. Barry was married to Ann from 1973 until his death and Paul has been married to Sue since 1988. Both brothers were smokers, although Paul had apparently quit by 2000. Paul lives in Haughton, Nottinghamshire, while Barry lived in Ravenfield, Rotherham, until his death.

In April 2007, while on holiday on the Greek island of Cephalonia, Paul broke his nose and suffered cuts and bruises when he lost control of his motorcycle after suddenly braking to avoid a goatherd and his herd. It was reported at the time that, instead of helping him, tourists who stopped at the accident shouted the Chuckle Brothers' catchphrase, "To me, to you". Paul later revealed on Richard Herring's Leicester Square Theatre Podcast that the story of tourists shouting out catchphrases was an invention in order to get the story in the newspapers.

An urban legend surrounding Barry Chuckle's supposed death from a heart attack had circulated since at least 2008. In 2010, the brothers issued a statement on their website stating that the story was "complete and utter rubbish". The BBC reported that the death hoaxes had upset young viewers, and had shocked Barry when they re-surfaced. The hoax was said to have initially spread via Facebook in 2008, but re-surfaced in 2010 via Twitter.

In December 2010, Barry announced his support for a proposal that one of the Conservative–Liberal Democrat coalition government's planned free schools, a taxpayer-funded school independent of the local authority, should be established in Rotherham. In January 2011, it was announced that Barry had planned to incorporate a 100-pupil free school named Rotherham Central Free School in his hometown of Rotherham. His son's partner was to serve as the head teacher of the school. By February 2012, no premises, staff or pupils for the school had been confirmed, despite announcing an intention on opening in September of that year.

In February 2014, the Chuckle Brothers attended the trial of Dave Lee Travis. Paul stated that he had no knowledge of the alleged events. After giving evidence, the pair posed for a selfie outside Southwark Crown Court with Paul sharing it on his Twitter account. The Brothers had smiled for the photograph, and some deemed their actions inappropriate.

In March 2016, Barry received condemnation for sharing a Facebook post from the far-right political party Britain First. The post, originally shared in June 2015, called on politicians to strip migrants of their citizenship if they left the country to join a terror group. Following the unearthing of the post, Tommy Robinson, former leader of the English Defence League (EDL), came to Barry's defence, calling on people to "leave the man alone". Britain First subsequently described the incident as a "non-story".

In March 2020, Paul contracted COVID-19 and suffered mild illness (which he described as "not nice"). He recorded a video message for his Twitter followers, urging them to stay at home to slow the spread of the disease.

Paul Chuckle was appointed Member of the Order of the British Empire (MBE) in the 2026 New Year Honours for charitable service, in recognition to his role as an ambassador for the Marie Curie charity which he took up after Barry's death.

=== Barry's death ===
On 5 August 2018, Barry died after a period of ill health. Paul grieved Barry's death: "I've not just lost my brother, I've lost my theatrical partner of many, many years and my very best friend."

Paul later revealed that his brother had been diagnosed with bone cancer, but had kept it secret from his manager, fans and Paul himself as he had wanted to perform for as long as possible. His funeral was held on 17 August at the New York Stadium, where Rotherham United play their home matches, and was attended by a number of show business friends; a large number of fans waited outside to pay their respects.
