= Chuckle Time =

British TV series

- Genre: Comedy; Clip show
- Starring: The Chuckle Brothers
- Country of origin: United Kingdom
- Original language: English
- No. of series: 1
- No. of episodes: 6 (12 originally commissioned)

Production
- Executive producer: Graham Stuart
- Producer: Robert Katz
- Running time: 60 minutes (inc. adverts)
- Production company: So Television

Original release
- Network: Channel 5
- Release: 16 June – 5 August 2018

Chuckle Time is a British television series which was broadcast on Channel 5 in 2018. The show was hosted by comedy duo Barry and Paul Elliott, The Chuckle Brothers. It was based on a similar style to that of You've Been Framed!, America's Funniest Home Videos and Australia's Funniest Home Video Show, where fans upload online videos. It was dubbed by the official press releases as "fails, flops, and funnies”, which The Chuckle Brothers watch and react to. The duo also performed sketches between the clips. It was the duo's final television programme together before Barry's death that year.

== Broadcast ==
Although twelve episodes were originally scheduled, the series was cut short following the sudden death of Barry Elliott on 5 August 2018 aged 73, meaning only six were broadcast. The final episode was shown in tribute to the comedian. It is unknown whether further episodes were recorded, as it was later stated that Barry had been forced to pull out of filming part-way through due to illness.

== Transmissions ==
Series	Start date	End date	Episodes
1	16 June 2018	5 August 2018	6
