= Africando =

Senegalese band

Africando is a musical project formed in 1992 to unite New York–based salsa musicians with Senegalese vocalists. Musicians from other African countries were later included under the name Africando All Stars.

Salsa has been a hugely popular style in Central and West Africa since the 1940s to 1950s, and the goal of Africando was to merge salsa rhythms from both sides of the Atlantic, mainly based on the African salsa tradition.

Africando was initiated by producer Ibrahima Sylla from Côte d'Ivoire and Malian arranger Boncana Maiga of Fania All-Stars. Some of the musicians initially involved were: Ronnie Baro (of Orquesta Broadway), Pape Seck (ex member of Star Band), Nicholas Menheim (associate of Youssou N'Dour), and Medoune Diallo (formerly with Orchestre Baobab).

The first two albums were a big success in Africa and in the World Music scene. Singer Pape Seck died in 1995, and was replaced by Gnonnas Pedro from Benin (who died August 2005) and Ronnie Baró of Orquestra Broadway.

For the album Mandali (2000), well known African musicians, such as Tabu Ley Rochereau, Koffi Olomidé, Salif Keita, Sekouba Bambino, Amadou Balaké and Thione Seck were invited. This new constellation led to the new name Africando All Stars. Whilst in the beginning, the songs were Latin American classics sung in wolof language or a mix of wolof and Spanish, newer songs were African popular music classics, redone with Latin rhythms and instrumentation. With both approaches, Africando has been equally successful.

For the album Martina (2003) the group name reverted to the name Africando. The singers on this tribute to mothers, sisters, wives and girlfriends include Ismaël Lô from Senegal, and Nyboma and King Kester Emeneya performing Papa Wemba's song "La Référence".

Gnonnas Pedro's last recording is the title track of Ketukuba (2006) – he died before the CD was released. The same fate befell Alfredo Rodriguez who arranged 3 tracks on the album. With the emphasis on the links between Cuba and Africa, Ketukuba includes a Latinized version of Franco's "Mario", sung by Madilu System, and Joe King singing "Nina Nina", previously made famous by the Fania All Stars.

In 1998, the group covered Aïcha, primarily recorded by Khaled.

== Discography ==
Albums

- Volume 1: Trovador (Stern's Africa STCD1045, 1993)
- Volume 2: Tierra Tradicional (Stern's Africa STCD1054, 1994) Released in France as Sabador
- Gombo Salsa (Stern's Africa STCD1071, 1996)
- Baloba (Stern's Africa STCD1082, 1998)
- Mandali (Stern's Africa STCD1092, 2000) Credited to Africando All Stars. Released in France as Betece
- Live! (Sono CDS8907, double CD, 2001) Out of print
- Martina (Stern's Africa STCD1096, 2003)
- Ketukuba (Stern's Africa STCD1103, 2006)
- Viva Africando (Stern's Music STCD1120, 2013)

Contributing artist

- The Rough Guide to World Music (World Music Network RGNET1001, 1994)
- The Rough Guide to the Music of Senegal (World Music Network RGNET 1284, 2013)
