= Orlando Contreras (singer) =

Cuban Bolero singer (1930–1994)

- Also known as: La Voz Romántica de Cuba
- Born: Orlando González Soto; 22 May 1930; Havana, Cuba
- Died: 9 February 1994 (aged 63) Medellín, Colombia
- Genres: Bolero
- Occupation: Singer
- Years active: 1952–1994
- Labels: Maype, Discos Fuentes, FM Discos y Cintas

Orlando González Soto, better known as Orlando Contreras (22 May 1930 – 9 February 1994), was a Cuban Bolero singer. He is known by his fans as "La Voz Romántica de Cuba" (Cuba's Romantic Voice).

== Life ==
Contreras was born on 22 May 1930 in Havana. He started singing in a variety of musical groups in Habana, among them the Arty Valdés trio, and from 1957 to 1958 he joined the Neno González Orchestra. In this orchestra he gained some notoriety and recorded songs that gained some success. While in the Neno Orchestra, Contreras also worked in the Conjunto Casino. After this he became a solo singer.

He lived in Cuba during the first years of the Cuban Revolution. In 1961 he recorded more songs, placing him among the better known singers. During this time he worked in the Alí Bar alongside Beny Moré, Fernando Álvarez and Orlando Vallejo. He also worked with the Musicuba band and in September 1965, he moved to the United States. His highest success was the song Esta tu canción.

Between 1966 and 1970, Contreras sang in a Portuguese tourist ship while also recording additional songs. During the 1970s he recorded an anthology with Daniel Santos and toured The Americas and Spain.

He last settled in Medellín, where during the 1960s, he and Daniel Santos were called "Los jefes" (the chiefs) by their fans in bars and clubs of downtown Medellín. While there, he recorded with the Fruko y sus Tesos orchestra.

Contreras died in Medellín, of pulmonary cancer.

== Career ==
Among his successes that landed him fame in Cuba and Latin America were: En un beso la vida, Sin egoísmo, Difícil, Amarga decepción, Por borracha, Por un puñado de oro, Dónde tu iras, Mi corazonada, Muerto en vida, Dolor de hombre, Que murmuren, Un amigo mío, Amigo de que, Yo estoy desengañado, Arráncame la vida, Egoísmo, Esta tu canción, Se muy bien que vendrás, and Corazón de Madera.
