= Gnonnas Pedro =

Beninese musician and singer

Gnonnan Sossou Pierre Kouassivi, born on 10 January 1943 in Cotonou, known by the stage name Gnonnas Pedro was a singer and musician from Lokossa, Benin. He is perhaps best known as the lead singer of Africando between 1995 and his death in 2004 but had been well known in his home country of Benin and beyond since the 1960s.

Pedro led his own bands Pedro y Sus Panchos, later reforming as Gnonnas Pedro and his Dadjes Band, before joining the long-lived Orchestre Poly-rythmo de Cotonou.

As a singer, songwriter, instrumentalist, and dancer, Pedro embraced many styles of music including highlife and juju. Pedro is credited with updating the traditional Agbadja style of his home region, creating Modern Agbadja. He sang in many different languages, including Mina, Adja, Yoruba, French, English, and Spanish. Pedro produced the song "Feso Jaiye", which became a hit and was performed by many bands at the 2nd All-Africa Games in 1973.

== Death ==
Gnonnas Pedro died on 12 August 2004, age 61, from prostate cancer in a hospital of Cotonou, Benin.

== Discography ==
=== Solo ===
- Dadjes: The Band Of Africa (1975)
- Gnonnas Pedro (Disco Stock, 1979)
- El Cochechivo (Ledoux, 1981)
- Agbadja (Syllart, 1999)
- Irma koi (Syllart, 1999)
- The best of Gnonnas Pedro (2003)

=== With Africando ===
- Gombo Salsa (Stern's Africa STCD1071, 1996)
- Baloba (Stern's Africa STCD1082, 1998)
- Mandali (Stern's Africa STCD1092, 2000) Credited to Africando All Stars. Released in France as Betece
- Live! (Sono CDS8907, double CD, 2001) Out of print
- Martina (Stern's Africa STCD1096, 2003)
- Ketukuba (Stern's Africa STCD1103, 2006) Released after his death.
