= Patton Brothers =

English comedy double act

The Patton Brothers
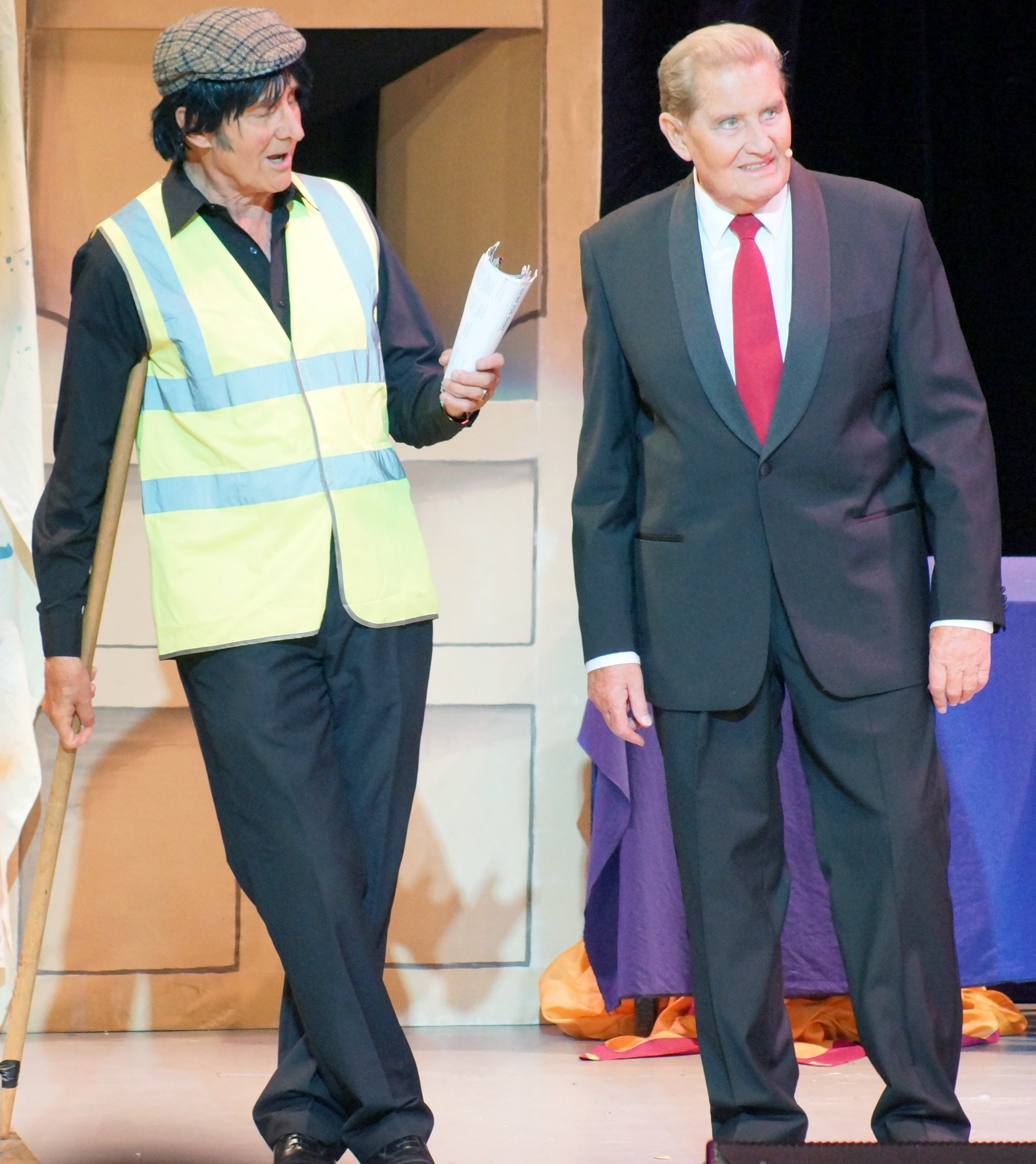
- Brian (left) and Jimmy (right) on stage at the Futurist Theatre in Scarborough, 2013
- Born: James Nightingale Elliott; 20 August 1931; Kent, England Brian Gene Elliott; 13 December 1933 (age 92); Kent, England
- Died: Jimmy Elliott: 26 July 2019 (aged 87)
- Notable credit: ChuckleVision (1990–2009)
- Spouse(s): Jimmy Elliott: Valerie (died c. 2010) Amy (m. 2017)
- Relatives: The Chuckle Brothers (younger brothers); Sophie and Pete Sandiford (niece and nephew)

Comedy career
- Years active: 1954–2019
- Medium: Television; stage
- Genre: Pantomime

The Patton Brothers, consisting of James (Jimmy) Elliott (20 August 1931 – 26 July 2019) and Brian Elliott (born 13 December 1933), were an English comedy double act and the two older brothers of Barry and Paul Elliott, the Chuckle Brothers. They began their career as a double act in the 1950s.

== Biography ==
Born in Kent to Amy and James (Jimmy) Patton Elliott, Jimmy and Brian grew up in Rotherham with their younger brothers Paul and Barry Elliott (known professionally as the Chuckle Brothers). Their father was a comedian who became known as Gene Patton.

When Jimmy left school in 1946, he joined "Britain's Dead End Kids" and appeared in five pantomimes before Brian joined him. The brothers got their big break in 1956 when they performed in Aladdin as Chinese policemen. Over the course of their career they appeared alongside British pantomime favourites such as Barbara Windsor, Ronnie Corbett and John Inman.

Both Jimmy and Brian made appearances in the children's television series ChuckleVision alongside their younger brothers Paul and Barry. Jimmy's character was known as "No Slacking" due to the catchphrase that he constantly used to berate the Chuckle Brothers; Brian's was known as "Get Out of It!" for similar reasons. Prior to ChuckleVision, all four brothers had appeared together on the game show 3-2-1 in 1982 and the talent show New Faces.

In 2015, Jimmy became engaged to a 25-year-old ChuckleVision fan whom he had met via Facebook. The couple married in 2017.

Jimmy died in July 2019, aged 87.
