= Bob Sinclar discography =

- Studio albums: 7
- Compilation albums: 8
- Singles: 42

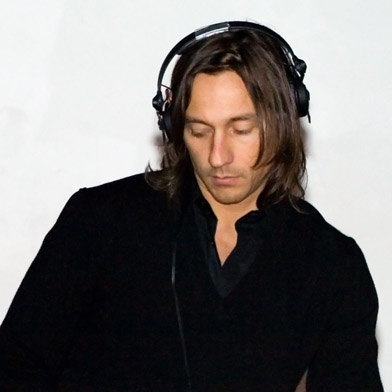
Bob Sinclar

This is the discography of French DJ and producer Bob Sinclar. He has released seven studio albums.

== Albums ==
=== Studio albums ===
List of studio albums, with selected chart positions
Title	Details	Peak chart positions										Certifications
Title	Details	FRA	AUS	BEL	ITA	NLD	POR	SPA	SWE	SWI	UK	Certifications
Paradise	Released: 3 October 1998; Labels: Yellow Productions, East West; Formats: CD, vinyl	27	—	—	—	—	—	—	—	—	88	
Champs Elysées	Released: 7 October 2000; Labels: Yellow Productions, Defected; Formats: CD, vinyl	28	—	—	—	—	—	—	—	84	148	SNEP: Gold
III	Released: 12 February 2003; Labels: Yellow Productions, Defected; Formats: CD, vinyl, digital download	24	—	—	—	—	—	—	—	—	—	
Western Dream	Released: 12 May 2006; Label: Yellow Productions, Defected; Formats: CD, vinyl, digital download	11	81	10	43	47	14	40	37	6	107	SNEP: 2× Platinum
Born in 69	Released: 11 May 2009; Labels: Yellow Productions, Universal; Formats: Digital download, CD	7	—	41	37	—	—	—	—	50	—	SNEP: Gold
Disco Crash	Released: 31 January 2012; Labels: Yellow Productions, Ministry of Sound; Formats: Digital download, CD	19	—	30	49	—	—	—	—	31	—	
Paris by Night	Released: 1 April 2013; Label: Yellow Productions; Formats: Digital download, CD	114	—	—	—	—	—	—	—	—	—	
"—" denotes a recording that did not chart or was not released in that territory.

=== Compilation, DJ mix and remix albums ===
List of compilation and DJ mix albums, with selected chart positions
Title	Details	Peak chart positions							Certifications
Title	Details	FRA	BEL	ITA	NLD	POR	SWI	UK	Certifications
Cerrone by Bob Sinclar	Released: 10 July 2001; Label: Malligator, Universal; Formats: CD, cassette, vinyl	13	26	—	—	—	—	—	
Enjoy	Released: 20 May 2004; Label: Yellow Productions; Formats: CD, digital download	45	83	—	—	—	—	—	
In the House	Released: 16 August 2005; Label: Defected; Formats: CD, digital download	57	80	—	—	—	—	—	
Soundz of Freedom	Released: 28 May 2007; Labels: Yellow Productions, Defected; Formats: CD, vinyl, DVD, digital download	7	22	—	85	10	22	144	SNEP: Gold
Live at the Playboy Mansion	Released: 24 September 2007; Label: Defected; Formats: CD, vinyl	48	74	—	—	—	11	—	
Made in Jamaïca	Released: 12 April 2010; Labels: Yellow Productions, Warner Music; Formats: Digital download, CD	103	78	77	—	—	—	—	
The Best Of	Released: 30 November 2010; Label: Yellow Productions; Formats: Digital download	—	—	73	—	—	—	—	
Knights of the Playboy Mansion (with Dimitri from Paris)	Released: 1 April 2011; Label: Defected; Formats: Digital download, CD	156	—	—	—	—	—	—	

== Singles ==
List of singles as lead artist, with selected chart positions and certifications, showing year released and album name
Title	Year	Peak chart positions										Certifications	Album
Title	Year	FRA	AUS	AUT	BEL (WA)	GER	ITA	NLD	SWI	UK	US Dance	Certifications	Album
"My Only Love" (featuring Lee A. Genesis)	1998	78	—	—	—	—	—	—	—	56	—		Paradise
"I Feel for You"	2000	44	60	—	53	94	—	—	39	9	—		Champs Elysées
"Darlin'"	2000	40	—	—	68	—	—	—	—	46	—		Champs Elysées
"The Beat Goes On"	2002	22	—	—	25	—	29	92	—	33	—		III
"Kiss My Eyes"	2003	34	—	—	17	—	—	79	—	67	23		III
"Love Generation" (featuring Gary Pine)	2005	3	1	1	1	1	9	3	2	12	1	SNEP: Gold; ARIA: Platinum; BPI: Silver; BRMA: Platinum; FIMI: Gold; IFPI AUT: Gold; IFPI SWI: Gold	Western Dream
"World, Hold On (Children of the Sky)" (featuring Steve Edwards)	2006	2	19	17	3	19	4	8	12	9	1	BPI: Silver; BRMA: Gold; FIMI: Platinum	Western Dream
"Rock This Party (Everybody Dance Now)" (with Cutee B featuring Dollarman, Big Ali and Makedah)	2006	3	6	12	1	18	11	12	4	3	1	BPI: Silver; BRMA: Gold; FIMI: Gold	Western Dream
"Tennessee" (featuring Farrell Lennon)	2007	—	—	—	25	—	21	—	—	—	—		Western Dream
"Sound of Freedom" (with Cutee B featuring Gary Pine and Dollarman)	2007	6	22	39	9	44	7	9	31	14	1		Soundz of Freedom
"Together" (featuring Steve Edwards)	2007	—	—	—	21	—	8	17	72	—	1		Soundz of Freedom
"What I Want" (with Fireball)	2007	6	—	—	8	—	—	8	57	52	2		Soundz of Freedom
"What a Wonderful World" (with Axwell featuring Ron Carroll)	2008	—	—	—	59	—	—	14	—	48	—		Born in 69
"Lala Song" (featuring The Sugarhill Gang)	2009	90	—	—	9	55	6	7	68	—	21		Born in 69
"New New New" (featuring Vybrate, Queen Ifrica and Makedah)	2009	—	—	—	53	—	—	57	—	—	—		Born in 69
"Love You No More" (featuring Shabba Ranks)	2009	—	—	—	34	—	—	56	—	—	—		Born in 69
"I Wanna" (with Sahara featuring Shaggy)	2010	—	—	—	24	87	—	84	46	—	—		Made in Jamaica
"Rainbow of Love" (featuring Ben Onono)	2010	—	—	—	60	—	5	—	—	—	—	FIMI: Gold	Made in Jamaica
"Tik Tok" (featuring Sean Paul)	2010	—	—	36	18	37	—	50	—	—	—		Disco Crash
"Far l'amore" (with Raffaella Carrà)	2011	26	—	23	15	46	6	16	16	—	—	FIMI: Platinum	Disco Crash
"Me Not a Gangsta" (featuring Mr Shammi and Colonel Reyel)	2011	44	—	—	84	—	—	—	—	—	—		Disco Crash
"Rock the Boat" (featuring Pitbull, Dragonfly and Fatman Scoop)	2011	22	—	51	15	45	20	47	20	—	—	FIMI: Gold	Disco Crash
"Fuck with You" (featuring Sophie Ellis-Bextor and Gilbere Forte)	2012	144	—	—	35	—	7	—	—	—	—	FIMI: Gold	Disco Crash
"Groupie"	2012	100	—	—	90	—	—	—	—	—	—		Disco Crash
"Summer Moonlight"	2013	—	—	—	35	—	—	—	—	—	—		Paris by Night
"Cinderella (She Said Her Name)"	2013	—	—	—	76	—	—	—	—	—	—		Paris by Night
"I Want You" (featuring CeCe Rogers)	2014	—	—	—	70	—	—	—	—	—	—		Non-album singles
"Feel the Vibe" (featuring Dawn Tallman)	2015	163	—	—	95	—	—	—	—	—	1	FIMI: Gold	Non-album singles
"Someone Who Needs Me"	2016	54	—	—	49	—	—	83	—	192	—	FIMI: Gold	Non-album singles
"Til the Sun Rise Up" (featuring Akon)	2017	142	—	—	—	—	—	—	—	—	—	FIMI: Gold	Non-album singles
"I Believe"	2018	85	—	—	66	—	56	—	—	—	—	FIMI: Gold	Non-album singles
"Electrico Romantico" (featuring Robbie Williams)	2019	—	—	—	70	—	—	—	—	—	—		Non-album singles
"I'm On My Way" (featuring Omi)	2020	—	—	—	—	—	—	—	—	—	—		Non-album singles
"We Could Be Dancing" (featuring Molly Hammar)	2021	—	—	—	—	—	93	—	—	—	—	FIMI: Gold	Non-album singles
"Borderline" (with Nyv)	2022	—	—	—	—	—	—	—	—	—	—		Non-album singles
"World, Hold On (Fisher Rework)" (featuring Steve Edwards)	2022	—	—	—	—	—	—	—	—	—	—	ARIA: Gold; BPI: 2× Platinum	Non-album singles
"Ti sento" (with Matia Bazar featuring Antonella Ruggiero)	2023	—	—	—	—	—	—	—	—	—	—	FIMI: Gold	Non-album singles
"I Can't Wait" (with Kiesza)	2026	—	—	—	26	—	— (Note: "I Can't Wait" did not enter the FIMI Singles Chart, but peaked at number 14 on the EarOne's Italian Airplay chart.)	—	—	—	—		Non-album singles
"—" denotes a recording that did not chart or was not released in that territory.

== Remixes ==
- Moby – "We Are All Made of Stars"
- Barbara Tucker – "I Get Lifted"
- Cerrone – "Give Me Love"
- Towa Tei – "Let Me Know"
- David Guetta – "It's Alright"
- Lu Colombo – "Maracaibo"
- Yves Larock featuring R. Richards – "Zookey"
- Stardust – "Music Sounds Better with You"
- Madonna – "4 Minutes"
- Rihanna – "Don't Stop the Music"
- Mika – "We Are Golden"
- Serge Gainsbourg – "Marabout"
- The Wanted – "I Found You"
- Annalisa – "Sinceramente"
