= Made in Jamaica (album) =

Made in Jamaïca

Remix album by Bob Sinclar
- Released: 2010
- Genre: Reggae; reggae fusion; raggamuffin
- Label: Yellow Productions
- Producer: Bob Sinclar

Bob Sinclar chronology
Born in 69 (2009)	Made in Jamaïca (2010)	Disco Crash (2012)

Made in Jamaica (stylised as MADE iN JAMAÏCA) is a remix album by French DJ Bob Sinclar album released in 2010 by Yellow Productions. "I Wanna" was released as a single.

== Overview ==
The album is a compilation of his greatest hits but mixed in reggae music style. It also includes two additional songs "I Wanna" and "Rainbow of Love". It has been released to positive reception from critics and fans.

Sly Dunbar (drums), Robbie Shakespeare (bass), Mickey "Mao" Chung (guitar) and Sticky Thompson (percussion), 30 years after playing on Serge Gainsbourg's Aux armes et cetera and Bad news from the stars, played again on Made in Jamaica. Robbie Lynn (keyboards), Shaggy, Tony Rebel and Queen Ifrica were amongst other artists appearing on the album.

The album was nominated for Best Reggae Album for the 53rd Grammy Awards.

== Track listing ==
1. "I Wanna" (with Sahara featuring Shaggy)
2. "Love Generation" (featuring Gary Pine)
3. "World, Hold On" (featuring Steve Edwards)
4. "The Beat Goes On" (featuring Queen Ifrica)
5. "Rainbow of Love" (featuring Ben Onono)
6. "Sound of Freedom" (with Cutee B featuring Gary Pine and Dollarman)
7. "Jamaica Avenue" (featuring Tony Rebel)
8. "Give a Little Love" (featuring Gary Pine)
9. "Peace Song" (featuring Steve Edwards)
10. "Kiss My Eyes" (featuring Camille Lefort)
11. "Together" (featuring Steve Edwards)
12. "I Feel for You" (featuring Queen Ifrica)
13. "I Wanna (Remix Radio)" (with Sahara featuring Shaggy)

== Charts ==
Chart performance for Made in Jamaica
Chart (2010)	Peak position
Belgian Albums (Ultratop Flanders)	84
Belgian Albums (Ultratop Wallonia)	78
French Albums (SNEP)	103
Italian Albums (FIMI)	77
