= Goleo and Pille =

Mascots of the 2006 World Cup

- Official image
- First appearance: 2006 FIFA World Cup
- Designed by: The Jim Henson Company

In-universe information
- Species: Lion (Goleo); Football (Pille)
- Nationality: German

Goleo VI, commonly known as Goleo, and Pille, were the official mascots for the 2006 FIFA World Cup in Germany. Goleo takes the form of a lion, and is never found far from his sidekick, Pille, a talking football.

Goleo is clad in a white football shirt with black collar and sleeve rims, similar to those worn by the Germany national team between the 1950s and 1970s, and is trouserless. He wears a uniform with the number 06 (short for 2006, the World Cup year he was the mascot), and has his name written above it on the back of his shirt. The Goleo costume was manufactured by The Jim Henson Company, at a cost of around €250,000. The word Pille, meaning "pill" in standard German, is otherwise a common German sports jargon for a football. Goleo was unveiled as the World Cup mascot on November 13, 2004, during the German television program Wetten, dass..?, presented by Pelé and Franz Beckenbauer.

On May 16, 2006, the German licence holder to produce Goleo, Bavarian toy company NICI, filed for bankruptcy. One apparent reason could be very high licence fees of around €28 million. Other sources, however, quote much lower licence fees of €3.5 million.

== Reception ==
The choice of a lion was criticized for not being a German animal, but rather the emblem of historical rivals England and the Netherlands. Designer Erik Spiekermann suggested that the mascot should have been an eagle (which appears on Germany's coat of arms) or even a squirrel as a symbol of the nation of frugality in his opinion. Criticism has also been raised of the fact that Goleo does not wear any trousers.

== Music appearances ==
"Love Generation"

He was also featured in the European version of music video for Bob Sinclar's song "Love Generation", which was released in Germany on December 9, 2005, the day of the draw of the World Cup.

"Dance!"

An animated Goleo also appeared in music videos for Lumidee's "Dance!" released in Spring 2006, just in time for the opening ceremonies for the World Cup.

"All Together Now"

Goleo VI also appears in Atomic Kitten's "All Together Now (Strong Together)", also released in the spring of 2006. The song was a remake of a song of 1990 by The Farm, called "All Together Now".

=== Goleo VI Discography ===
Year	Single	Peak chart positions										Album
Year	Single	AUS	AUT	DEN	FIN	FRA	GER	ITA	NED	SUI	UK	Album
2006	"Dance!" (Goleo VI presents Lumidee VS. Fatman Scoop)	60	5	17	5	30	5	18	70	32		FIFA World Cup 2006 Soundtrack
2006	"All Together Now (Strong Together)" (Goleo VI & Atomic Kitten)	–	35	–	–	–	16	–	–	42	–	

Featured in

Year	Single	Peak chart positions										Album
Year	Single	AUS	BEL (Vl)	FRA	GER	ITA	NED	SPA	SUI	UK	US Dance	Album
2005	"Love Generation" (Bob Sinclar presents Goleo IV featuring Gary "Nesta" Pine)	1	1	3	1	9	2	6	2	12	1	Western Dream

== See also ==
- FIFA World Cup mascot
