= Soundz of Freedom =

Remix album by Bob Sinclar
- Released: 21 May 2007
- Recorded: 2006–2007
- Genre: Electronica; reggae fusion; ragga
- Length: 75:23
- Label: Tommy Boy Entertainment; Ministry of Sound Australia
- Producer: Cutee B.; Bob Sinclar; Martin Solveig

Bob Sinclar chronology
Western Dream (2006)	Soundz of Freedom (2007)	Born in 69 (2009)

Professional ratings
Review scores
Source	Rating
AllMusic	3.5/5 stars

Soundz of Freedom (also known as Soundz of Freedom: My Ultimate Summer of Love Mix) is a Bob Sinclar album released on 21 May 2007 on Tommy Boy Entertainment. The cover design is by James Rizzi.

== Track listing ==
1. "Sound of Freedom" (with Cutee B featuring Gary Pine and Dollarman)
2. "Rock This Remix 2007" (featuring Dollarman and Big Ali)
3. "What I Want" (presents Fireball)
4. "Hard" (featuring the Hard Boys)
5. "Kiss My Eyes" (Cubeguys Remix)
6. "I Feel for You" (Axwell Remix)
7. "Everybody Movin'" (Part 1; Kurd Maverick and Eddie Thoneick Remix)
8. "Everybody Movin'" (Part 2; Guy Schreiner Remix)
9. "Ultimate Funk" (featuring Big Ali; Tocadisco Remix)
10. "The Beat Goes On" (Mousse T. Remix)
11. "Champs Elysées Theme" (Jamie Lewis Remix)
12. "Tribute" (featuring Michael Robinson and Ron Carroll)
13. "Together" (featuring Steve Edwards)
14. "Give a Lil' Love" (Part 2; Eric Kupper Remix)

There is another version of "Everybody Movin'" on the Australian release of this album (15 August 2007)

Due to a pressing error on the Australian version, track 14, "Give a Lil' Love" (Part 2) (Eric Kupper Remix), was placed first and all tracks are subsequently pushed down a spot.

== Charts ==
=== Weekly charts ===
Weekly chart performance for Soundz of Freedom
Chart (2007)	Peak position
Belgian Albums (Ultratop Flanders)	22
Belgian Albums (Ultratop Wallonia)	10
Dutch Albums (Album Top 100)	85
French Albums (SNEP)	7
Portuguese Albums (AFP)	10
Swiss Albums (Schweizer Hitparade)	22
UK Albums (OCC)	144

=== Year-end charts ===
Year-end chart performance for Soundz of Freedom
Chart (2007)	Position
Belgian Albums (Ultratop Wallonia)	67
French Albums (SNEP)	54
