= List of Billboard number-one dance singles of 2007 =

Billboard magazine compiled the top-performing dance singles in the United States during 2007 on the Hot Dance Club Play, the Hot Dance Singles Sales, and the Hot Dance Airplay. Premiered in 1976, the Hot Dance Club Play chart ranked the most-played singles on dance club based on reports from a national sample of club DJs. The Hot Dance Singles Sales chart was launched in 1985 to compile the best-selling dance singles based on retail sales across the United States. The Hot Dance Airplay was first published in 2003, ranking the singles based on airplay detections on dance radio.

== Charts history ==
Chart history
Issue date	Hot Dance Club Play		Hot Dance Singles Sales		Hot Dance Airplay		Ref.
Issue date	Song	Artist(s)	Song	Artist(s)	Song	Artist(s)	Ref.
January 6	"I Believe"	Georgie Porgie	"Jump"	Madonna	"My Love"	Justin Timberlake featuring T.I.	
January 13	"So Excited"	Janet featuring Khia	"Shut Me Up"	Mindless Self Indulgence	"My Love"	Justin Timberlake featuring T.I.	
January 20	"Hurt"	Christina Aguilera	"Jump"	Madonna	"My Love"	Justin Timberlake featuring T.I.	
January 27	"Party People"	Altar featuring Jeanie Tracy	"Jump"	Madonna	"My Love"	Justin Timberlake featuring T.I.	
February 3	"We Ride"	Rihanna	"Jump"	Madonna	"My Love"	Justin Timberlake featuring T.I.	
February 10	"Illegal"	Shakira featuring Carlos Santana	"Every Day Is Exactly The Same"	Nine Inch Nails	"U + Ur Hand"	Pink	
February 17	"Dangerous Power"	Gabriel & Dresden featuring Jan Burton	"Jump"	Madonna	"U + Ur Hand"	Pink	
February 24	"Rock This Party (Everybody Dance Now)"	Bob Sinclar featuring Big Ali and Dollarman	"Every Day Is Exactly The Same"	Nine Inch Nails	"Proper Education (The Wall)"	Eric Prydz vs. Pink Floyd	
March 3	"Runaway"	Jamiroquai	"Every Day Is Exactly The Same"	Nine Inch Nails	"Proper Education (The Wall)"	Eric Prydz vs. Pink Floyd	
March 10	"Irreplaceable"	Beyoncé	"Every Day Is Exactly The Same"	Nine Inch Nails	"Say It Right"	Nelly Furtado	
March 17	"Say It Right"	Nelly Furtado	"Every Day Is Exactly The Same"	Nine Inch Nails	"Say It Right"	Nelly Furtado	
March 24	"And I Am Telling You I'm Not Going"	Jennifer Hudson	"Every Day Is Exactly The Same"	Nine Inch Nails	"Say It Right"	Nelly Furtado	
March 31	"Angelicus"	Delerium featuring Isabel Bayrakdarian	"Every Day Is Exactly The Same"	Nine Inch Nails	"Say It Right"	Nelly Furtado	
April 7	"Love Me or Hate Me (Fuck You!!!!)"	Lady Sovereign	"Every Day Is Exactly The Same"	Nine Inch Nails	"Say It Right"	Nelly Furtado	
April 14	"U Spin Me"	Inaya Day	"Every Day Is Exactly The Same"	Nine Inch Nails	"Say It Right"	Nelly Furtado	
April 21	"Rise"	Samantha James	"Every Day Is Exactly The Same"	Nine Inch Nails	"Say It Right"	Nelly Furtado	
April 28	"Automatic"	Ultra Naté	"Every Day Is Exactly The Same"	Nine Inch Nails	"Read My Mind"	The Killers	
May 5	"With Love"	Hilary Duff	"Every Day Is Exactly The Same"	Nine Inch Nails	"Read My Mind"	The Killers	
May 12	"Beautiful Liar"	Beyoncé and Shakira	"Every Day Is Exactly The Same"	Nine Inch Nails	"Read My Mind"	The Killers	
May 19	"Beautiful Liar"	Beyoncé and Shakira	"Every Day Is Exactly The Same"	Nine Inch Nails	"Cry for You"	September	
May 26	"Read My Mind"	The Killers	"Every Day Is Exactly The Same"	Nine Inch Nails	"Cry for You"	September	
June 2	"With Love"	Hilary Duff	"Every Day Is Exactly The Same"	Nine Inch Nails	"Glamorous"	Fergie featuring Ludacris	
June 9	"Change"	Kimberley Locke	"I Could Fall In Love With You"	Erasure	"The World Is Mine"	David Guetta featuring JD Davis	
June 16	"I Want Your Love"	Jody Watley	"Every Day Is Exactly The Same"	Nine Inch Nails	"The World Is Mine"	David Guetta featuring JD Davis	
June 23	"Qué Hiciste"	Jennifer Lopez	"Every Day Is Exactly The Same"	Nine Inch Nails	"Umbrella"	Rihanna featuring Jay-Z	
June 30	"All Good Things (Come to an End)"	Nelly Furtado	"Every Day Is Exactly The Same"	Nine Inch Nails	"Umbrella"	Rihanna featuring Jay-Z	
July 7	"Umbrella"	Rihanna featuring Jay-Z	"Every Day Is Exactly The Same"	Nine Inch Nails	"Umbrella"	Rihanna featuring Jay-Z	
July 14	"Umbrella"	Rihanna featuring Jay-Z	"Do It Again"	The Chemical Brothers	"Umbrella"	Rihanna featuring Jay-Z	
July 21	"My Destiny"	Kim English	"Do It Again"	The Chemical Brothers	"Umbrella"	Rihanna featuring Jay-Z	
July 28	"Roller Coaster"	Erika Jayne	"Every Day Is Exactly The Same"	Nine Inch Nails	"Umbrella"	Rihanna featuring Jay-Z	
August 4	"Makes Me Wonder"	Maroon 5	"I Could Fall In Love With You"	Erasure	"Umbrella"	Rihanna featuring Jay-Z	
August 11	"Whine Up"	Kat DeLuna featuring Elephant Man	"I Could Fall In Love With You"	Erasure	"Makes Me Wonder"	Maroon 5	
August 18	"Stranger"	Hilary Duff	"Shut Me Up	Mindless Self Indulgence	"Makes Me Wonder"	Maroon 5	
August 25	"Sound of Freedom"	Bob Sinclar	"White Lies"	Paul Van Dyk Featuring Jessica Sutta	"Stranger"	Hilary Duff	
September 1	"Like This"	Kelly Rowland featuring Eve	"White Lies"	Paul Van Dyk Featuring Jessica Sutta	"Stranger"	Hilary Duff	
September 8	"Don't Stop the Music"	Rihanna	"White Lies"	Paul Van Dyk Featuring Jessica Sutta	"LoveStoned"	Justin Timberlake	
September 15	"Deep into Your Soul"	Friscia & Lamboy	"White Lies"	Paul Van Dyk Featuring Jessica Sutta	"LoveStoned"	Justin Timberlake	
September 22	"Make It Last"	Dave Audé featuring Jessica Sutta	"Birthday"	The CruxShadows	"LoveStoned"	Justin Timberlake	
September 29	"LoveStoned"	Justin Timberlake	"Peacebone"	Animal Collective	"Love Is Gone"	David Guetta featuring Chris Willis	
October 6	"Love Vibrations"	Barbara Tucker	"Peacebone"	Animal Collective	"LoveStoned"	Justin Timberlake	
October 13	"Walk Away"	Tony Moran featuring Kristine W	"Knock Down The Walls"	Chubby Checker	"The Way I Are"	Timbaland featuring Keri Hilson	
October 20	"Hold It Don't Drop It"	Jennifer Lopez	"White Lies"	Paul Van Dyk Featuring Jessica Sutta	"Don't Stop The Music"	Rihanna	
October 27	"Disrespectful"	Chaka Khan featuring Mary J. Blige	"Big Girl (Now)	Silva Jaguar featuring Dirt Bag	"Gimme More"	Britney Spears	
November 3	"Disrespectful"	Chaka Khan featuring Mary J. Blige	"Big Girl (Now)	Silva Jaguar featuring Dirt Bag	"Gimme More"	Britney Spears	
November 10	"Do It"	Nelly Furtado	"Knock Down The Walls"	Chubby Checker	"Gimme More"	Britney Spears	
November 17	"Amazing"	Seal	"Big Girl (Now)"	Silva Jaguar featuring Dirt Bag	"Gimme More"	Britney Spears	
November 24	"Amazing"	Seal	"Tonto"	Battles	"Gimme More"	Britney Spears	
December 1	"Do It Well"	Jennifer Lopez	"Tonto"	Battles	"Gimme More"	Britney Spears	
December 8	"Shut Up and Drive"	Rihanna	"Tonto"	Battles	"Carry Me Away"	Chris Lake featuring Emma Hewitt	
December 15	"Gimme More"	Britney Spears	"Cuntry Boner"	Puscifer	"In My Arms"	Plumb	
December 22	"Keep Your Body Working"	Tony Moran featuring Martha Wash	"Cuntry Boner"	Puscifer	"In My Arms"	Plumb	
December 29	"Keep Your Body Working"	Tony Moran featuring Martha Wash	"Cuntry Boner"	Puscifer	"Amazing"	Seal	

== See also ==
- 2007 in American music
- List of Billboard Hot 100 number ones of 2007
