= Tennessee (Bob Sinclar song) =

Promotional single by Bob Sinclar featuring Farrell Lennon

from the album Western Dream
- Released: January 2007
- Recorded: 2005
- Genre: Electro house, Bluegrass music
- Length: 5:05 (Album version)
- Label: Yellow Productions YP 225
- Songwriters: Lene Lovich, Bob Sinclar, Alain Wisniak
- Producer: Bob Sinclar

Bob Sinclar chronology
"Rock This Party (Everybody Dance Now)" (2006)	"Tennessee" (2007)	"Everybody Movin'" (2007)

Audio video
- "Tennessee" on YouTube

"Tennessee" is the fourth promotional single from French music producer and DJ Bob Sinclar's studio album Western Dream, featuring Farrell Lennon. The record was released in January 2007 via Yellow Productions label.

== Release ==
The full CD release of the single was cancelled in March 2007 in favour of the new song, "Sound of Freedom". It was confirmed on the Bob Sinclar official website.

== Credits ==
- Backing Vocals – Bob Sinclar, Farrell Lennon
- Bass – Zaf
- Guitar – Anatole Wisniak, "Tom Tom" Naim
- Keyboards – Cutee B
- Lead Vocals, Featuring – Farrell Lennon
- Effects [Beat Booming, Loop] – Bob Sinclar
- Producer – Bob Sinclar

== Charts ==
=== Weekly charts ===
Chart (2007)	Peak position
Hungary (Dance Top 40)	16
