= List of Ultratop 40 number-one singles of 2006 =

This is a list of songs that topped the Belgian Walloon (francophone) Ultratop 40 in 2006.

Issue Date	Artist	Song
January 7	Madonna	Hung Up
January 14	Madonna	Hung Up
January 21	Kamel	Mon Amour
January 28	Kamel	Mon Amour
February 4	Tina Arena	Aimer Jusqu'à L'impossible
February 11	Juanes	La Camisa Negra
February 18	Juanes	La Camisa Negra
February 25	Juanes	La Camisa Negra
March 4	Juanes	La Camisa Negra
March 11	Juanes	La Camisa Negra
March 18	Natasha St-Pier	Un Ange Frappe à Ma Porte
March 25	Diam's	La Boulette (Génération Nan Nan)
April 1	Najoua Belyzel	Gabriel
April 8	Najoua Belyzel	Gabriel
April 15	Diam's	La Boulette (Génération Nan Nan)
April 22	Diam's	La Boulette (Génération Nan Nan)
April 29	Najoua Belyzel	Gabriel
May 6	Diam's	La Boulette (Génération Nan Nan)
May 13	Diam's	La Boulette (Génération Nan Nan)
May 20	Shakira feat Wyclef Jean	Hips Don't Lie
May 27	Shakira feat Wyclef Jean	Hips Don't Lie
June 3	Shakira feat Wyclef Jean	Hips Don't Lie
June 10	Shakira feat Wyclef Jean	Hips Don't Lie
June 17	Shakira feat Wyclef Jean	Hips Don't Lie
June 24	Shakira feat Wyclef Jean	Hips Don't Lie
July 1	Shakira feat Wyclef Jean	Hips Don't Lie
July 8	Shakira feat Wyclef Jean	Hips Don't Lie
July 15	Gnarls Barkley	Crazy
July 22	Gnarls Barkley	Crazy
July 29	Gnarls Barkley	Crazy
August 5	Gnarls Barkley	Crazy
August 12	La Plage	Coup de Boule
August 19	La Plage	Coup de Boule
August 26	La Plage	Coup de Boule
September 2	La Plage	Coup de Boule
September 9	La Plage	Coup de Boule
September 16	La Plage	Coup de Boule
September 23	La Plage	Coup de Boule
September 30	La Plage	Coup de Boule
October 7	Bob Sinclair, Cutee-B, Dollarman & Big Ali	Rock This Party (Everybody Dance Now)
October 14	Bob Sinclar, Cutee-B, Dollarman & Big Ali	Rock This Party (Everybody Dance Now)
October 21	Bob Sinclar, Cutee-B, Dollarman & Big Ali	Rock This Party (Everybody Dance Now)
October 28	Bob Sinclar, Cutee-B, Dollarman & Big Ali	Rock This Party (Everybody Dance Now)
November 4	Bob Sinclar, Cutee-B, Dollarman & Big Ali	Rock This Party (Everybody Dance Now)
November 11	Moby feat Mylène Farmer	Slipping Away (Crier La Vie)
November 18	Tribal King	Façon Sex
November 25	Moby feat Mylène Farmer	Slipping Away (Crier La Vie)
December 2	Moby feat Mylène Farmer	Slipping Away (Crier La Vie)
December 9	Faudel	Mon Pays
December 16	Fatal Bazooka	Fous ta cagoule
December 23	Fatal Bazooka	Fous ta cagoule
December 30	Fatal Bazooka	Fous ta cagoule

== Best-Selling Singles ==
This is the ten best-selling/performing singles in 2006.

Pos.	Artist	Title	HP	Weeks
1	Shakira featuring Wyclef Jean	"Hips Don't Lie"	1	35
2	La Plage	"Coup de Boule"	1	21
3	Najoua Belyzel	"Gabriel"	1	31
4	Diam's	"La Boulette (Génération Nan Nan)"	1	30
5	Juanes	"La Camisa Negra"	1	43
6	Pakito	"Living on Video"	3	36
7	Gnarls Barkley	"Crazy"	1	32
8	Nadiya	"Roc"	2	26
9	Natasha St-Pier	"Un Ange Frappe à mon Porte"	1	37
10	Sean Paul	"Temperature"	2	28

== See also ==
- 2006 in music
