= Sound of Freedom (disambiguation) =

Sound of Freedom is a 2023 American film by Alejandro Monteverde.

Sound of Freedom may also refer to:

== Music ==
- "Sound of Freedom" (song), by Bob Sinclar
- "Sounds of Freedom", a song by Within Temptation from The Heart of Everything
- Soundz of Freedom, an album by Bob Sinclar

== Other uses ==
- Sounds of Freedom, US army runners in Great Aloha Run

== See also ==
- Freedom of Sound, album by Bret Michaels, lead singer of the rock band Poison
