= Born in 69 =

Studio album by Bob Sinclar
- Released: 14 July 2009
- Recorded: 2009
- Genre: Electronica; raggamuffin; reggae fusion
- Length: 59:30
- Label: Yellow Productions; Ministry of Sound Australia
- Producer: Bob Sinclar

Bob Sinclar chronology
Soundz of Freedom (2007)	Born in 69 (2009)	Made in Jamaïca (2010)

Singles from Born in 69
- 1. "Lala Song" Released: 3 April 2009; 2. "Love You No More" Released: 15 June 2009; 3. "Peace Song" Released: September 2009

Born in 69 is the fifth studio album by French DJ Bob Sinclar, released on 14 July 2009 on Yellow Productions.

== Track listings ==
All tracks are written by Bob Sinclair except where noted.

French CD (5318005)
No.	Title	Featuring	Length
1.	"Lala Song"	The Sugarhill Gang	3:34
2.	"Give Me Some More"	Roland Clark	3:18
3.	"Love You No More"	Shabba Ranks	4:22
4.	"New New New"	Vybrate, Queen Ifrica and Makedah	5:27
5.	"Jamaïca Avenue"	Tony Rebel	5:10
6.	"Peace Song"	Steve Edwards	6:30
7.	"What a Wonderful World"	Axwell & Ron Carroll	7:04
8.	"Mr. Tambourine Man"		4:59
9.	"People of Tomorrow"	Steve Edwards	4:16
10.	"The Way I Feel"	Adam Joseph	4:53
11.	"We Are Everything"		5:46
12.	"Belly Dancer"	Kevin Lyttle	4:11
Total length:			59:30

Japan bonus tracks (AVCD-23894) (Note: This edition omits the track "What a Wonderful World".)
No.	Title	Music	Length
13.	"In the Getho" (Club Mix)
14.	"Lala Song" (Tocadisco Remix)	DJ Tocadisco
15.	"Lala Song" (Dexpistols Remix)	Dexpistols

Ukrainian CD (460502670192)
No.	Title	Length
12.	"Looks Like Love"	2:56
Total length:		52:31

UK remix version
No.	Title	Length
13.	"Lala Song" (Spencer & Hill Remix)	6:32
14.	"Love You No More" (The Count & Sinden Remix)	4:44
15.	"Love You No More" (Chuckie Remix)	5:39
16.	"New New New" (Avicii Remix)	8:23
17.	"Peace Song" (Viva Delux Lighter Shade Remix)	7:13
18.	"Mr. Tambourine Man" (Benassi Bros. Remix)	6:57
Total length:		94:46

Brazil bonus track (60075326119)
No.	Title	Featuring	Length
13.	"Lala Funk"	MC Leozinho	3:04
Total length:			58:27

== Charts ==
=== Weekly charts ===
Chart performance for Born in 69
Chart (2009)	Peak position
Belgian Albums (Ultratop Flanders)	41
Belgian Albums (Ultratop Wallonia)	25
French Albums (SNEP)	7
Italian Albums (FIMI)	37
Swiss Albums (Schweizer Hitparade)	50

=== Year-end charts ===
Year-end chart performance for Born in 69
Chart (2009)	Position
French Albums (SNEP)	154
