= Gym and Tonic =

1998 single by Spacedust

Single by Spacedust

from the album Hits n' Pieces
- B-side: "Spacegroove"
- Released: 12 October 1998
- Length: 7:18 (original mix); 3:24 (radio edit)
- Label: East West
- Songwriter: Spacedust
- Producer: Spacedust

Spacedust singles chronology
| "Gym and Tonic" (1998) | "Let's Get Down!" (1999) |

"Gym and Tonic" is a single released by British production duo Spacedust. The song was originally recorded by French record producer Bob Sinclar as "Gym Tonic", with co-production by Thomas Bangalter. The track was included on Sinclar's album Paradise. Their version sampled "Arms", a workout recording by American actress Jane Fonda. However, Fonda refused clearance of her vocals being used as a sample, which eventually led to a single never being released. When Spacedust recorded their version of the track, the Fonda vocal samples were re-recorded with a session vocalist.

Released on 12 October 1998, the song sold 66,000 copies to debut at No. 1 on the UK Singles Chart on 18 October; it was the lowest-selling UK number-one song of 1998, ranking in at number 109 on the year-end chart. Despite this, it received a silver certification from the British Phonographic Industry for shipments exceeding 200,000 copies the same year. It also reached No. 10 in Iceland and New Zealand, No. 17 in Ireland, and the top 40 in Belgium (Flanders and Wallonia).

== Music video ==
The music video for Spacedust's track depicts an exercise workout filmed on 2 August 1998 and featured an appearance by Nancy Sorrell. In an ode to exercise videos from the 1980s and 1990s, it was intentionally cheaply made with production costs for the video at over £10,000. It regularly features on VH1's "worst videos" lists.

== Track listings ==
UK, European and Australian CD single

1. "Gym and Tonic" (radio) – 3:19
2. "Gym and Tonic" (original mix) – 7:18
3. "Spacegroove" – 6:29

UK cassette single

1. "Gym and Tonic" (radio) – 3:19
2. "Spacegroove" – 6:29

== Charts and certifications ==
=== Weekly charts ===
| Chart (1998) | Peak position |
|---|---|
| Belgium (Ultratop 50 Flanders) | 35 |
| Belgium (Ultratop 50 Wallonia) | 39 |
| Europe (Eurochart Hot 100) | 11 |
| Iceland (Íslenski Listinn Topp 40) | 10 |
| Ireland (IRMA) | 17 |
| New Zealand (Recorded Music NZ) | 10 |
| Scottish Singles Sales (Official Charts) | 2 |
| UK Singles (Official Charts) | 1 |

=== Year-end charts ===
| Chart (1998) | Position |
|---|---|
| UK Singles (OCC) | 109 |

== Certifications ==
| Region | Certification | Certified units/sales |
|---|---|---|
| United Kingdom (BPI) | Silver | 200,000^{^} |
^{^} Shipments figures based on certification alone.
