= Paradise (Bob Sinclar album) =

Studio album by Bob Sinclar
- Released: 3 October 1998
- Genre: French house
- Length: 60:09
- Label: Yellow Productions
- Producers: Bob Sinclar, Q-T Fingers, Lee A. Genesis, Tommy Musto

Bob Sinclar chronology
Paradise (1998)	Champs Elysées (2000)

Singles from Paradise
- 1. "My Only Love" Released: 1998; 2. "The Ghetto" Released: 1998; 3. "Ultimate Funk" Released: 1998

Professional ratings
Review scores
Source	Rating
AllMusic	2.5/5 stars

Paradise is the debut studio album by French house DJ Bob Sinclar. It was released via Yellow Productions in 1998. The same year, "Gym Tonic" was remade into "Gym and Tonic" by the British production duo Spacedust, and reached number one on the UK Singles Chart.

== Track listing ==
No.	Title	Length
1.	"Intro"	0:25
2.	"Get into the Music" (by Q-T Fingers)	5:19
3.	"Disco 2000 Selector"	5:22
4.	"My Only Love" (featuring Lee A. Genesis)	4:37
5.	"Paradise Interlude"	0:40
6.	"The Ghetto" (featuring Karl the Voice)	6:32
7.	"New York City Music"	6:19
8.	"Ultimate Funk"	5:33
9.	"Move Your Body"	4:09
10.	"Souvenir"	2:24
11.	"Vision of Paradise"	6:25
12.	"Mo Underground People"	5:08
13.	"Gym Tonic" (Thomas Bangalter Mix)	6:11

Japanese edition bonus tracks
No.	Title	Length
14.	"Rock Solid"	6:14
15.	"Lonely in L.A."	8:11

== Personnel ==
Credits adapted from liner notes.

- Bob Sinclar – writing, composition, production (except "Get into the Music")
- Q-T Fingers – writing, production (on "Get into the Music")
- Lee A. Genesis – writing, production (on "My Only Love")
- Tommy Musto – writing, production (on "My Only Love")
- Ernest St. Laurent – guitar (on "My Only Love")
- Thomas Bangalter – programming, mixing (on "Gym Tonic")
- Cutee B – mixing
- JC – mastering
- J-C Polien – cover
- Serge Jacques – booklet
- Alain Charlot – booklet
- La Shampouineuse – design
- Alain Ho – A&R
- Chris "Da French Kiss" – A&R

== Charts ==
Chart (1998)	Peak position
French Albums (SNEP)	27
New Zealand Albums (RMNZ)	48
UK Albums (Official Charts)	88
Chart (2022)	Peak position
Belgian Albums (Ultratop Wallonia)	199
