= Loïs Andréa =

- "Duo" cover art

Background information
- Born: Loïs Andréa
- Origin: France
- Genres: R&B, Funk
- Years active: 1998–present
- Label: Barclay/ Universal (1998–present)
- Website: Myspace Loïs Andréa

Loïs Andréa is a French singer, backup singer, songwriter and music producer. She is best known for her 1998 R&B/Funk hit "In".

== Career ==
=== Debut album Insomnies (1998–1999) ===
Loïs Andréa released her first single "In" on 7 July 1998. A mix of R&B, funk and dance, the song was ranked 22nd in the French charts. Her second single, "Insomnie", was released on 12 January 1999, and was ranked 35th in the French charts.

On 16 February 1999, she released her first album, "Insomnie", which was co-produced by Jean-Patrick Allouche. The album contained songs influenced by R&B, funk, dance and gospel, an example being the track "Vivre". A third single, "Duo", was released on 2 June 1999 and was ranked 49th in the French charts. It contained a sample of the hit "You And I" from "Delegation". Her fourth single was also released in 1999.

In 2001, the song "In" was used in the film Yamakasi – Les samouraïs des temps modernes, directed by Ariel Zeitoun. However, it was not included in the original movie soundtrack.

In 2002, she released the single "Laisse Aller".

=== Comeback (2007–2011) ===
During the summer of 2007, Loïs Andréa was featured in the track "Marseille" from the album Parti De Rien by rapper El Matador.

In 2008, "Funk Machine (Asterix Funk)" and "All We Need", of which she collaborated with DJ Abdel and rapper Big Ali, were used as part of the soundtrack of the film Asterix at the Olympic Games. All We Need was released as a single and was ranked 65th in the French charts.

In 2009, the track "Eggo" was used as part of the soundtrack of "Les Majorettes", an episode of the television film saga Joséphine, ange gardien.

In 2011, Loïs appeared as a guest performer for the track "Number One" by rapper Rohff, she was featured as a vocalist on "Funk You" with Mister You and Francisco and Additionally, she also featured in "Johnny Hama" with Johnny Hama and Coco, tracks in the successful "Evolution 2011" by DJ Abdel.

Due to controversies with her record label, she rarely performs live. She is currently writing and recording a new album.

== Discography ==
=== Albums ===
Insomnies – 1999 – Barclay

1. Impro – intro
2. Insomnie
3. Ton language
4. In
5. Somebody else
6. Déplaire
7. Mal d'homme
8. Vivre
9. Duo
10. Je suis à toi
11. Toute une vie
12. Last time
13. Lilla
14. Ce soir
15. Impro – outro

=== Singles ===
- In (1998)
- Insomnie (1999)
- Duo (1999)
- Vivre (1999)
- Laisse Aller (2002)
- Funk Machine (Astérix Funk) (DJ Abdel feat. Loïs Andréa and Big Ali) (face B taken from the 1st single of the soundtrack Asterix at the Olympic Games) (2008)
- All We Need (DJ Abdel feat. Loïs Andréa and Big Ali) (single from the soundtrack Asterix at the Olympic Games) (2008)
