= NICI =

NICI may refer to:

- National Information and Communications Infrastructure, a program initiative of UNECA in Africa
- Nijmegen Institute for Cognition and Information, a Dutch research institute
- NICI AG, a German toy manufacturer
- Negative ion Chemical ionization, now more frequently abbreviated NCI, a mode of operation of a gas chromatography - mass spectrometry (GC-MS) system that allows molecules resolved by GC to be measured as negative ions by MS.
- National Innovative Capacity Index

== See also ==
- Lia Nici, British politician
