= Western Dream =

Studio album by Bob Sinclar
- Released: 10 April 2006
- Recorded: 2004–2006
- Genres: Electronica; Eurodance; raggamuffin; house
- Length: 70:35
- Labels: Defected; Tommy Boy; Ministry of Sound Australia
- Producers: Bob Sinclar; Cutee B.; Martin Solveig

Bob Sinclar chronology
III (2005)	Western Dream (2006)	Soundz of Freedom (2007)

Professional ratings
Review scores
Source	Rating
AllMusic	3/5 stars

Western Dream is the fourth studio album by French producer Bob Sinclar. The album is one of his most successful albums, spawning the hit singles "Love Generation", which was a number one hit in Europe, "World, Hold On (Children of the Sky)", that also became a top ten hit in many European countries, "Rock This Party (Everybody Dance Now)", which was also a hit, reaching the top ten in most European countries and "Tennessee".

The album features guest vocal performances from "World's Greatest Lover" singer Farrell Lennon, Reggae artist Gary 'Nesta' Pine, Steve Edwards, Ron Carroll and MZ Toni. The track "Give a lil' Love" features the same whistling melody as "The Whistle Song" by Frankie Knuckles.

== Release dates ==
It was released on 11 July 2006 in North America, and was meant to be released in the UK, Japan and China on 10 July 2006, but instead was delayed until August 10 for Japanese release. For Australia and New Zealand, a release date of 1 May was chosen. In Europe, the album was released earlier, in the Netherlands on 24 April, 10 April in France, and 12 May in Germany.

== Track listing ==
=== European version ===
No.	Title	Writer(s)	Producer(s)	Length
1.	"Love Generation" (featuring Gary Pine)	Gary Pine, Duane Harden, Alain Wisniak, JG Schreiner, Christophe Le Friant	Christophe Le Friant	8:52
2.	"Tennessee" (featuring Farrell Lennon)	Lene Lovich, Wisniak, Le Friant	Le Friant	5:05
3.	"Everybody Movin'" (featuring Ron Carroll and Mz Toni)	Ron Carroll, Le Friant, Fred Poulet	Le Friant	4:38
4.	"World, Hold On (Children of the Sky)" (featuring Steve Edwards)	Steve Edwards, Le Friant, Michaël Tordjman	Le Friant, Michell	6:41
5.	"Miss Me"	F. R. David, Wisniak, Le Friant	Le Friant	4:36
6.	"For You"	Martin Solveig, Le Friant, Schreiner	Le Friant, Martin Solveig	5:22
7.	"You Don't Go For.."	Bon Jovi, Muse		4:37
8.	"Sing My Song"	Carroll, Le Friant, Schreiner	Le Friant	5:16
9.	"In the Name of Love"	Edwards, Le Friant, Schreiner	Le Friant	6:00
10.	"Amora, Amor"	Rolando Faria, Le Friant	Le Friant	5:17
11.	"Shining from Heaven"	Pine, Harden, Le Friant	Le Friant	6:21
12.	"Give a Lil' Love" (featuring Gary Pine)	Pine, Harden, Le Friant, Schreiner		4:42
13.	"Love Generation" (Ron Carroll Remix)	Pine, Harden, Wisniak, Schreiner, Le Friant	Le Friant	7:45

DVD bonus disc
No.	Title	Length
1.	"My Only Love" (music video)
2.	"I Feel for You" (music video)
3.	"Darlin'" (music video)
4.	"Save Our Soul" (music video)
5.	"The Beat Goes On" (music video)
6.	"Kiss My Eyes" (music video)
7.	"Love Generation" (music video)
8.	"You Don't Go For.." (music video)
9.	"World, Hold On" (music video)
10.	"I Feel for You" (the making of)
11.	"My Only Love" (the making of)
12.	"The Beat Goes On" (the making of)
13.	"Kiss My Eyes" (the making of)
14.	"Love Generation" (the making of)
15.	"You Don't Go For.." (the making of)
16.	"World, Hold On" (the making of)

=== American version ===
Disc one
No.	Title	Writer(s)	Producer(s)	Length
1.	"Rock This Party (Everybody Dance Now)" (with Cutee B featuring Dollarman, Big Ali and Makedah)	Samuel Conrad, Naomi Goulbourne, Fred Poulet, Christophe Le Friant	Christophe Le Friant, Cutee B	4:05
2.	"Love Generation" (featuring Gary Pine)	Gary Pine, Duane Harden, Alain Wisniak, JG Schreiner, Le Friant	Le Friant	8:52
3.	"Tennessee" (featuring Farrell Lennon)	Lene Lovich, Wisniak, Le Friant	Le Friant	5:05
4.	"Everybody Movin'" (featuring Ron Carroll and Mz Toni)	Ron Carroll, Le Friant, Poulet	Le Friant	4:38
5.	"World, Hold On" (featuring Steve Edwards)	Steve Edwards, Le Friant, Michaël Tordjman	Le Friant, Michell	6:38
6.	"Miss Me"	F. R. David, Wisniak, Le Friant	Le Friant	4:36
7.	"For You"	Martin Solveig, Le Friant, Schreiner	Le Friant, Martin Solveig	5:22
8.	"Sing My Song"	Ron Carroll, Le Friant, Schreiner	Le Friant	5:15
9.	"In the Name of Love"	Edwards, Le Friant, Schreiner	Le Friant	6:00
10.	"Amora, Amor"	Rolando Faria, Le Friant	Le Friant	5:17
11.	"Shining from Heaven"	Pine, Harden, Le Friant	Le Friant	6:18
12.	"Give a Lil' Love" (featuring Gary Pine)	Pine, Harden, Le Friant, Schreiner		4:42
13.	"World, Hold On" (Axwell Remix)	Edwards, Le Friant, Tordjman	Le Friant, Michell	7:27

=== iTunes UK version ===
No.	Title	Writer(s)	Producer(s)	Length
1.	"Love Generation" (featuring Gary Pine)	Gary Pine, Duane Harden, Alain Wisniak, JG Schreiner, Le Friant	Christophe Le Friant	8:52
2.	"World, Hold On" (featuring Steve Edwards)	Steve Edwards, Le Friant, Michaël Tordjman	Le Friant, Michell	6:38
3.	"Tennessee" (featuring Farrell Lennon)	Lene Lovich, Wisniak, Le Friant	Le Friant	5:05
4.	"In the Name of Love"	Edwards, Le Friant, Schreiner	Le Friant	6:00
5.	"Miss Me"	F. R. David, Wisniak, Le Friant	Le Friant	4:36
6.	"Sing My Song"	Ron Carroll, Le Friant, Schreiner	Le Friant	5:15
7.	"Rock This Party (Everybody Dance Now)" (with Cutee B featuring Dollarman, Big Ali and Makedah)	Samuel Conrad, Naomi Goulbourne, Fred Poulet, Le Friant	Le Friant, Cutee B	4:05
8.	"For You"	Martin Solveig, Le Friant, Schreiner	Le Friant, Martin Solveig	5:22
9.	"Everybody Movin'" (featuring Ron Carroll and Mz Toni)	Carroll, Le Friant, Poulet	Le Friant	4:38
10.	"Amora, Amor"	Rolando Faria, Le Friant	Le Friant	5:17
11.	"Shining from Heaven"	Pine, Harden, Le Friant	Le Friant	6:18
12.	"Give a Lil' Love"	Pine, Harden, Le Friant, Schreiner	Le Friant	4:35
13.	"Love Generation" (Ron Carroll Remix)	Pine, Harden, Wisniak, Schreiner, Le Friant	Le Friant	7:45
14.	"World, Hold On (Children of the Sky)" (music video)

== Charts ==
=== Weekly charts ===
Weekly chart performance for Western Dream
Chart (2006)	Peak position
Australian Albums (ARIA)	81
Belgian Albums (Ultratop Flanders)	10
Belgian Albums (Ultratop Wallonia)	10
Canadian Albums (Nielsen SoundScan)	88
Dutch Albums (Album Top 100)	47
French Albums (SNEP)	11
Hungarian Albums (MAHASZ)	23
Italian Albums (FIMI)	43
Portuguese Albums (AFP)	14
Spanish Albums (Promusicae)	40
Swedish Albums (Sverigetopplistan)	37
Swiss Albums (Schweizer Hitparade)	6
UK Albums (Official Charts)	107
UK Album Downloads (Official Charts)	42
UK Dance Albums (Official Charts)	5
UK Independent Albums (Official Charts)	6

=== Year-end charts ===
Year-end chart performance for Western Dream
Chart (2006)	Position
Belgian Albums (Ultratop Flanders)	67
Belgian Albums (Ultratop Wallonia)	53
French Albums (SNEP)	45

== Certifications ==
Certifications for Western Dream
Region	Certification	Certified units/sales
France (SNEP)	2× Platinum	200,000^{‡}
^{‡} Sales+streaming figures based on certification alone.
