= I Wanna (Bob Sinclar song) =

Single by Bob Sinclar and Sahara featuring Shaggy

from the album Made in Jamaïca
- Released: 29 June 2010
- Recorded: 2009
- Genre: House; reggae fusion
- Length: 3:45 (album version)
- Label: Yellow Productions; Ministry of Sound Australia
- Songwriters: Orville Burrell; Constantin Ioniță; Christophe Le Friant
- Producer: Bob Sinclar

Bob Sinclar singles chronology
"Love You No More" (2009)	"I Wanna" (2010)	"Rainbow of Love" (2010)

Music video
- "I Wanna" on YouTube

"I Wanna" is the first single from French music producer and DJ Bob Sinclar's studio album, Made in Jamaïca, released in 2010. It features Balkan duo Sahara (consisted of Bulgarian singer Andrea and Romanian producer Costi Ioniță) and Jamaican musician Shaggy.

== Track listings and format ==
Promo - CD-single Yellow / N.E.W.S.

1. I Wanna (Radio Edit) - 3:18
2. I Wanna (Reggae Version) - 3:17

The Remixes - 12" maxi D:vision DV 694

1. I Wanna (Michel Calfan Remix) - 7:13
2. I Wanna (Ludovic Ross, Xavier Maldini & Sylvain Armand Remix) - 7:17

CD-single Yellow / N.E.W.S. 541416503596 [be] / EAN 5414165035961

1. I Wanna (Radio Edit) - 3:19
2. I Wanna (Reggae Version) - 3:17
3. I Wanna (Extended Mix) - 5:24
4. I Wanna (Michael Calfan Remix) - 7:13

CD, Maxi-single 8-track - D vision Records – DV 694.10 CDS

1. I Wanna (Radio Edit) [3:18]
2. I Wanna (Lorenzo Di Grasso & Romain Pelletti Radio Mix) [3:18]
3. I Wanna (Extended Mix) [5:23]
4. I Wanna (Michael Calfan Remix) [7:13]
5. I Wanna (Sylvain Armand Remix) [8:02]
6. I Wanna (Lorenzo Di Grasso & Romain Pelletti Club Remix) [6:16]
7. I Wanna (Ludovic Ross, Xavier Maldini & Sylvain Armand Remix) [7:16]
8. I Wanna (Maxime Torres Vs. Klm Trip Remix) [5:50]

== Charts ==
Chart (2010)	Peak position
Belgium (Belgian Singles Chart) (Flanders)	24
Germany (German Singles Chart)	87
Poland (Polish Airplay New)	1
Switzerland (Swiss Singles Chart)	46

== See also ==
- List of music released by Romanian artists that has charted in major music markets
