= Love You No More =

Single by Bob Sinclar featuring Shabba Ranks

from the album Born in 69
- Released: 7 May 2009 (FR)
- Recorded: 2009
- Genre: House, reggae fusion
- Length: 4:22 (Album Version); 3:26 (Radio Edit)
- Label: Yellow Productions; Ministry of Sound Australia
- Songwriters: Christophe le Friant, Shabba Ranks
- Producer: Bob Sinclar

Bob Sinclar singles chronology
"Lala Song" (2009)	"Love You No More" (2009)	"I Wanna" (2010)

Music video
- "Love You No More" on YouTube

"Love You No More" is the second single issued by French music producer and DJ Bob Sinclar from his studio album Born in 69 (which was released worldwide on 14 July 2009). The song features Shabba Ranks and samples Manu Chao's Bongo Bong.

== Track listings ==
1. ."Love You No More" (Original Club Version) – 5:28
2. ."Love You No More" (Nicola Fasano Remix Club Version) – 7:30
3. ."Love You No More" (Chuckie Remix) – 5:35
4. ."Love You No More" (Jean Guy Schreiner Remix) – 7:14

== Charts ==
Chart (2009)	Peak position
Belgium (Ultratop 50 Flanders)	34
Czech Republic Airplay (ČNS IFPI)	89
Netherlands (Mega Top 100)	56
