= DJ Skillz =

French turntablist

DJ Skillz is a French disc jockey and turntablist, winner of the DMC World DJ Championship in 2018, 2019, and 2020.

== Biography ==
He is from Biarritz. His real name is Jimmy Da Costa Santos. He becomes DJ at twenty.

His DJ's name is inspired by the song "Skills" of the American hip hop duo Gang Starr with the rapper Guru and DJ Premier.

He has received influence from DJs such as Cut Killer, Netik, Troubl, Unkut, D-Styles, Ligone, LL Cool DJ, Rafik, Craze, and I-emerge.

== Awards ==
=== French awards ===
He has been 9 times champion of France.

=== World awards ===
==== International DJ Association Championship ====
- 2011 : Second place, technical category
- 2013 : Third place, technical category
- 2015 : Winner, technical category
- 2016 : Second place, show category, with Mendosam et KTDR1

==== DMC World DJ Championship ====
- 2017 : Second place, in solo
- 2018 : Winner, in solo, and online category
- 2019 : Winner, in solo
- 2020 : Winner, in solo

== See also ==
- Channel on Youtube
