= Everybody Movin' =

Promotional single by Bob Sinclar featuring Ron Carroll and Mz Toni

from the album Western Dream
- Released: January 2007
- Recorded: 2005
- Genre: Electronica
- Length: 4:38 (Album version)
- Label: Tommy Boy; Ministry of Sound Australia
- Songwriters: Bob Sinclar, Ronald Carroll, Greg Levias, Fredric Christ Poulet
- Producer: Bob Sinclar

Bob Sinclar chronology
"Tennessee" (2007)	"Everybody Movin'" (2007)	"Sound of Freedom" (2007)

Audio video
- "Everybody Movin'" on YouTube

"Everybody Movin'" is the fifth promotional single from French music producer and DJ Bob Sinclar's studio album Western Dream, featuring Ron Carroll and Mz Toni. The single was released to Spanish dance radio in November 2006. It is considered the fourth single from the album in Spain and the fifth for other countries.

== Track listing ==
Promo single

1. "Everybody Movin'" (featuring Ron Carroll and Mz Toni) – 4:38
2. "Everybody Movin'" (Eddie Thoneick & Kurd Maverick Remix) – 7:35

CD, maxi-single 8-track (D:vision Records; DV 489.07 CDS)

1. "Everybody Movin'" (Radio Edit) – 3:49
2. "Everybody Movin'" (Ron Carroll Remix Radio) – 3:17
3. "Everybody Movin'" (Woody Bianchi Movin' Remix Radio) – 3:43
4. "Everybody Movin'" (Kurd Maverick & Eddie Thoneick Remix) – 7:37
5. "Everybody Movin'" (Guy Schreiner Remix) – 5:40
6. "Everybody Movin'" (Ron Carroll Remix) – 7:02
7. "Everybody Movin'" (Woody Bianchi Movin' Remix) – 7:45
8. "Everybody Movin'" (Original Club Mix) – 5:28

== Charts ==
Chart (2006)	Peak position
Germany Dance Singles Chart	3
Hungary (Dance Top 40)	23
Hungary (Single Top 40)	7
Spanish Dance Singles Chart	1
