= Champs Elysées (album) =

Studio album by Bob Sinclar
- Released: 7 October 2000
- Recorded: 1999–2000
- Genre: House
- Length: 53:02
- Label: Yellow Productions; Defected
- Producer: Bob Sinclar

Bob Sinclar chronology
Paradise (1998)	Champs Elysées (2000)	III (2003)

Champs Elysées is the second studio album by French DJ Bob Sinclar, released in October 2000 on Yellow Productions. It reached number 28 in France and number 94 in Switzerland. The song "I Feel For You" ranked 75 on the 2000 year-end for Music & Media's Border Breakers chart, a European chart for airplay performance outside each artist's country of label signing.

== Critical reception ==
Professional ratings
Review scores
Source	Rating
AllMusic	3/5 stars
NME	2/5 stars

John Bush of AllMusic wrote that with the album, Sinclar "proved himself a solid producer despite the lack of freshness, adding in plenty of swooping strings, nickel-bag guitars, and soft-toned keyboards", calling "Got to Be Free" and "Darlin'" "disco-mover productions that wouldn't sound out of place on classic American R&B radio", and concluding that Sinclar "has plenty of fun throughout the LP". Piers Martin of NME was considerably more negative, calling most of Champs Elysées "a feeble facsimile" of the "fabled times" of "New York's early-'80s club culture" and the sound of disco. Martin summarised the album as a "predictable whirl of artificial strings, filtered loops and strident glitterball house", judging that "it's clear Sinclar doesn't have an original idea in his impeccably coiffured head".

== Track listing ==
1. "Champs Elysées Theme" – 4:26
2. "I Feel for You" – 5:50
3. "You Are Beautiful" – 2:06
4. "Striptease" – 4:29
5. "Got to Be Free" (feat. James ''D-Train'' Williams) – 5:43
6. "Life" (feat. Chezere vs. Ken Norris) – 6:25
7. "Save Our Soul" – 4:22
8. "Phasing News" – 4:05
9. "Ich Rocke" – 4:06
10. "Freedom" (feat. Gene Van Buren) – 6:30
11. "Something Little Bit Clumsy" – 3:54
12. "Darlin'" (feat. James ''D-Train'' Williams) – 5:00

Bonus track on some CD versions

12. "My Only Love" – 3:33

French CD and digital bonus tracks

12. "I Feel for You" (Bob's Disco Remix) – 7:14
13. "Ich Rocke" (Turntablerocker Remix) – 5:11

== Charts ==
Chart performance for Champs Elysées
Chart (2000)	Peak position
French Albums (SNEP)	28
Swiss Albums (Schweizer Hitparade)	84
UK Albums (OCC)	148
