= Spacedust =

British production duo

Spacedust were the British production duo of Paul Glancy and Duncan Glasson.

They had a number one hit single in the UK Singles Chart in 1998 with "Gym and Tonic". The track was technically a cover of Bob Sinclar's single "Gym Tonic," although the song only credits Spacedust as the sole writer and producer. A full release of Sinclar's original song was refused by Jane Fonda, who was sampled on the record.

The music video, despite being made in the late 1990s, was made to look cheap even though it cost over £10,000. It regularly features on VH1's "worst videos" lists.

After this number one, they released a further hit "Let's Get Down", which was based on Chic's "I Want Your Love". Both tracks were released on the East West Records label.

== Discography ==
- "Gym and Tonic" – 1998 – UK No. 1
- "Let's Get Down" – 1999 – UK No. 20.
