= Lala Song =

Single by Bob Sinclar featuring The Sugarhill Gang

from the album Born in 69
- Released: 3 April 2009
- Recorded: 2009
- Length: 3:34 (album version)
- Label: Yellow Productions; Ministry of Sound Australia
- Songwriters: August Darnell; Bob Sinclar; Master Gee; Tracy Blair Temple; Henry Williams; Wonder Mike
- Producer: Bob Sinclar

Bob Sinclar singles chronology
"Sound of Freedom" (2007)	"Lala Song" (2009)	"Love You No More" (2009)

Music video
- "Lala Song" on YouTube

"Lala Song" is a song by French DJ and record producer Bob Sinclar, released on 3 April 2009 as the lead single from his sixth studio album Born in 69. The track samples the 1979 hit "Rapper's Delight" by The Sugarhill Gang, featuring in fact rappers Hen Dogg, Master Gee and Wonder Mike from the band.

== Chart performance ==
=== Weekly charts ===
Weekly chart performance for "Lala Song"
Chart (2009)	Peak position
Belgium (Ultratop 50 Flanders)	9
Belgium (Ultratop 50 Wallonia)	14
CIS Airplay (TopHit)	19
Czech Republic Airplay (ČNS IFPI)	13
France (SNEP)	90
Germany (GfK)	55
Hungary (Dance Top 40)	9
Hungary (Single Top 40)	9
Israel (Media Forest)	5
Italy (FIMI)	6
Netherlands (Dutch Top 40)	5
Netherlands (Single Top 100)	7
Spain (Promusicae)	26
Switzerland (Schweizer Hitparade)	68
US Dance Club Songs (Billboard)	21

=== Year-end charts ===
Year-end chart performance for "Lala Song"
Chart (2009)	Position
Belgium (Ultratop Flanders)	66
Belgium (Ultratop Wallonia)	69
CIS (Tophit)	116
Hungary (Dance Top 40)	56
Italy (FIMI)	37
Netherlands (Dutch Top 40)	45
Netherlands (Single Top 100)	51
