= Silent Poets =

Japanese electronic duo

- Also known as: "Silence" Foundation Laboratory
- Origin: Tokyo, Japan
- Genres: Acid jazz, downtempo, dub, trip hop
- Years active: 1991–present
- Labels: Toy's Factory, Yellow Productions
- Members: Michiharu Shimoda
- Past members: Takahiro Haruno
- Website: silentpoets.net

Silent Poets is a Japanese electronic duo (now solo project). They have released six original albums and more than seven remix albums/EPs until now. Gaining international recognition, Silent Poets has been featured in countless music/fashion magazines, and in over 30 compilations around the world ranging from the USA, UK, France, Germany, and Italy, including the well known "Cafe Del Mar" compilation.

Silent Poets' music has been described as drawing from acid jazz and downtempo styles, and comparisons have been made with Japanese artists such as DJ Krush and United Future Organization. Their sound has been noted for its use of piano arrangements, orchestral elements and layered rhythms. The group has collaborated with a number of musicians and producers, including ACO, Coldcut, Frederic Galliano, Attica Blues, DJ Vadim, Towa Tei, Ken Hirai and Ursula Rucker.

== History ==
Silent Poets was formed by Michiharu Shimoda in 1991. Their first meaningful work was the album Potential Meeting released in 1992 on Toy's Factory. After releasing their fifth album To Come..., Haruno left the group and Silent Poets became Shimoda's solo project. After that Shimoda composed music for fashion shows, released a huge number of remixes. The 2005 album, Sun, was released after a six year gap in recordings.

In 2018, Silent Poets released the album dawn, featuring the song "Asylums for the Feeling." The song would be used in Hideo Kojima's game Death Stranding, appearing both in marketing and in the final game. Silent Poets would also compose one of the songs for the end credits. Silent Poets currently composes the music for Kojima's weekly Spotify podcast Hideo Kojima presents Brain Structure.

== Discography ==
=== CD ===
- Potential Meeting (1993, Toy's Factory)
- Words and Silence (1994, Toy's Factory)
- drawing (1995 Toy's Factory)
- Firm Roots (1996, Toy's Factory)
- For Nothing (1997, Toy's Factory)
- To Come... (1999, Toy's Factory)
- Sun (2005, Rush! Production)
- Another Trip from Sun (2013, Another Trip)
- dawn (2018, Another Trip)
- HOPE (2025, Another Trip)

=== Singles and EPs ===
- "La Vie"/"Shalom" 12“ (1994, Bellissima Records)
- "Drawing" CD/LP (1995, Toy's Factory)
- Cherry Tree EP CD/12 (1997, Toy's Factory)
- Sugar Man EP CD (1999, Toy's Factory)
- "Save the Day" 12“ (2000, Yellow Productions)
- "Someday" 12“ (2000, Yellow Productions)
- "Almost Nothing" feat. Okay Kaya (2019, Another Trip)

=== Soundtrack ===
- A Woman Like You (1993)
- Tori (2004)
- Death Stranding (2019)
- Hideo Kojima presents Brain Structure (2022)
- Death Stranding 2: On the Beach (2025)

=== Compilations ===
- Cafe Del Mar vol 2 (dos), 1995
- Funkungfusion from Ninja Tunes, 1998
- X-Mix: Fast Forward & Rewind
