= III (Bob Sinclar album) =

Studio album by Bob Sinclar
- Released: February 2003
- Recorded: 2001–2002
- Genre: House; electroclash
- Length: 68:16
- Label: Yellow Productions
- Producer: Bob Sinclar

Bob Sinclar chronology
Champs Elysées (2000)	III (2003)	Western Dream (2006)

III is the third studio album by French DJ Bob Sinclar. It was released in February 2003 on Yellow Productions, and reached number 24 on the French albums chart.

== Critical reception ==
Professional ratings
Review scores
Source	Rating
Uncut	2/5 stars

An Uncut review from May 2003 found that while Sinclar's music is "frothier and camper than ever" on III, he "has a new-found focus and vitality [...] Whereas so much electroclash lacks melodic thrills, there's an abundance of crisp, pulsating tunes here. And despite the disco flashbacks, Le Friant favours twisted re-interpretations over dead-handed pastiches". The review concluded by noting that "[f]ans of Daft Punk's Discovery will love it".

Jack Smith, writing for BBC Music, felt that III is Sinclar's homage to French disco artist Cerrone, given Sinclar's compilation Cerrone by Bob Sinclar (2001), and his collaboration with songwriters Lene Lovich and Alain Wisniak on III, both of whom previously composed several songs for Cerrone. While acknowledging Sinclar's intention for a "new sound" after being an "international man of mystery" on his first two records, Smith opined that "herein lies the problem [...] III, his latest opus, is nothing less than average, and at times dull", summarising that the album's "pluses are few and far between".

== Track listing ==
1. "The Beat Goes On" – 2:59
2. "Kiss My Eyes" – 4:20
3. "If I Was" – 4:41
4. "La Music Is Fantastique" – 4:44
5. "Nature Boy" – 4:50
6. "Who Needs Sleep Tonight" – 5:01
7. "Sexy Dancer" – 5:12
8. "I'm Not Perfect" – 4:59
9. "Do It" – 3:34
10. "Métro Blanche" – 3:22
11. "Beat the Clock" – 3:03
12. "Europa" – 4:12
13. "So High" – 5:11
14. "Fantasy" (includes the hidden track "I Wanna Go Bang") – 12:08

== Charts ==
Chart performance for III
Chart (2003)	Peak position
French Albums (SNEP)	24
