= NICI AG =

German toy manufacturer

NICI GmbH
- Logo used since 2009
- Type: Gesellschaft mit beschränkter Haftung (GmbH)
- Industry: Toys, consumer goods
- Founded: June 1st, 1986
- Founder: Ottmar Pfaff
- Headquarters: Altenkunstadt, Bavaria, Germany
- Area served: Worldwide
- Products: Plush toys, stationery, figurines, greeting cards, pillows, water bottles, magnets
- Owner: Strategic Value Partners Group (fund-controlled)
- Number of employees: ~400
- Website: https://www.nici.de/

NICI or NICI GmbH is the name of a German toy factory based in Altenkunstadt in the north Bavarian region of Upper Franconia. The company was founded in 1986, and produces plush toys, stationery, figurines, greeting cards, pillows, water bottles, magnets, and other merchandise. Lots of their products are collectibles for children, with series of matching plush characters and school accessories. NICI produced Goleo, the mascot of the 2006 FIFA World Cup.

In the United States, NICI products were imported by Enesco.

== History ==
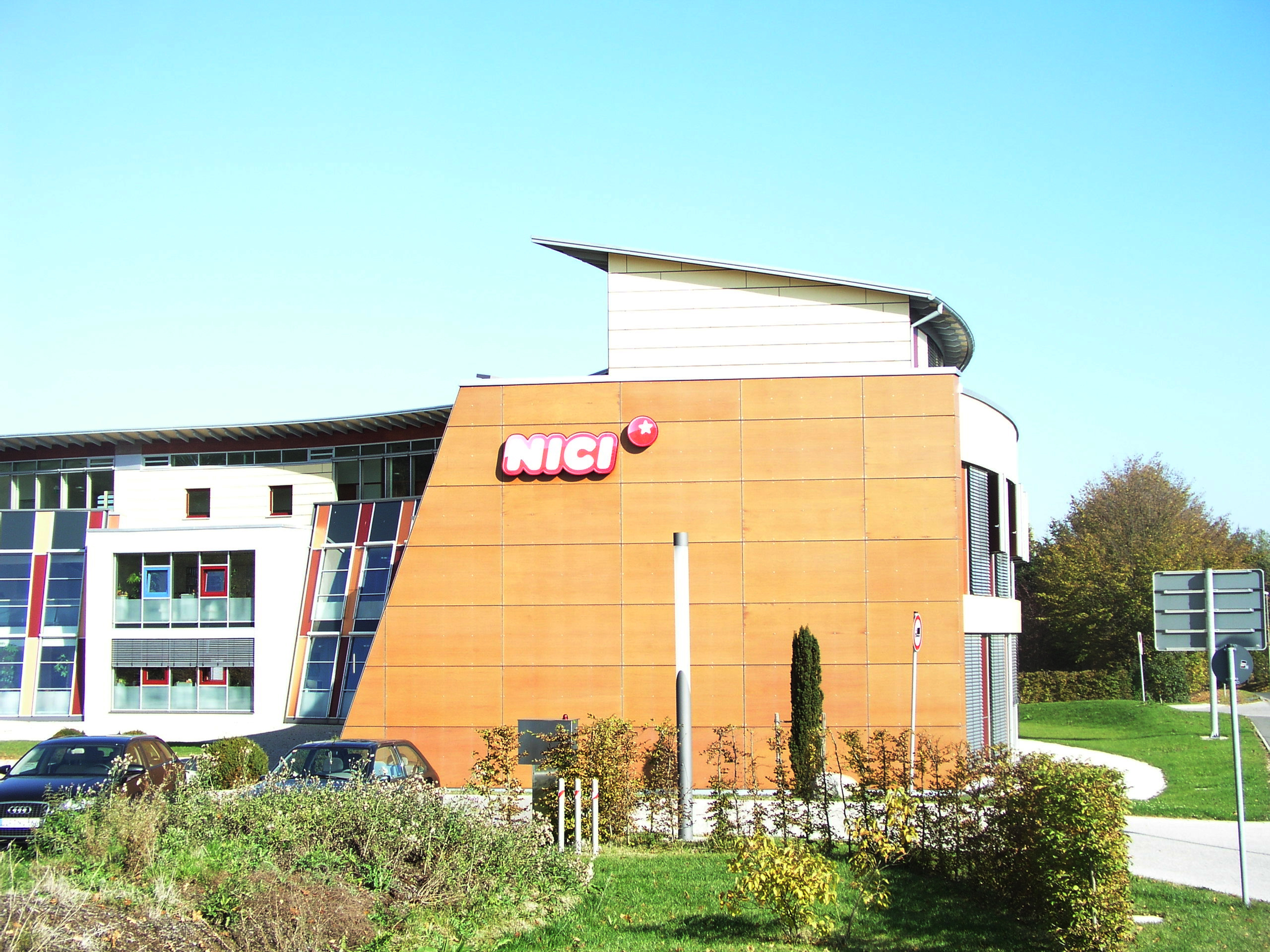
Main building in Altenkunstadt, Bavaria

The company was founded on June 1st, 1986 by Ottmar Pfaff and his wife Marina in Michelau, Bavaria, as a private business. The founder started designing and making the first stuffed animals at home. The first stuffed animals ever made were a turtle, a duck, a frog and a eagle.

In following years, the company transformed into a joint-stock company. It expanded its product line to include magnets, mugs, pillows school supplies, and more.

In May 2006, the founder and long-time CEO, Ottmar Pfaff, was arrested for charges of serious financial irregularities, including falsifying business records and fraud. In June 2007, a court sentenced Pfaff to six and a half years in prison for fraud and embezzlement.

The company filed for bankruptcy in the same year that Pfaff was arrested. In December of that year the firm was taken over by a fund controlled by the Strategic Value Partners Group. The company changed its legal base back from Aktiengesellschaft to Gesellschaft mit beschränkter Haftung.

== Operations ==
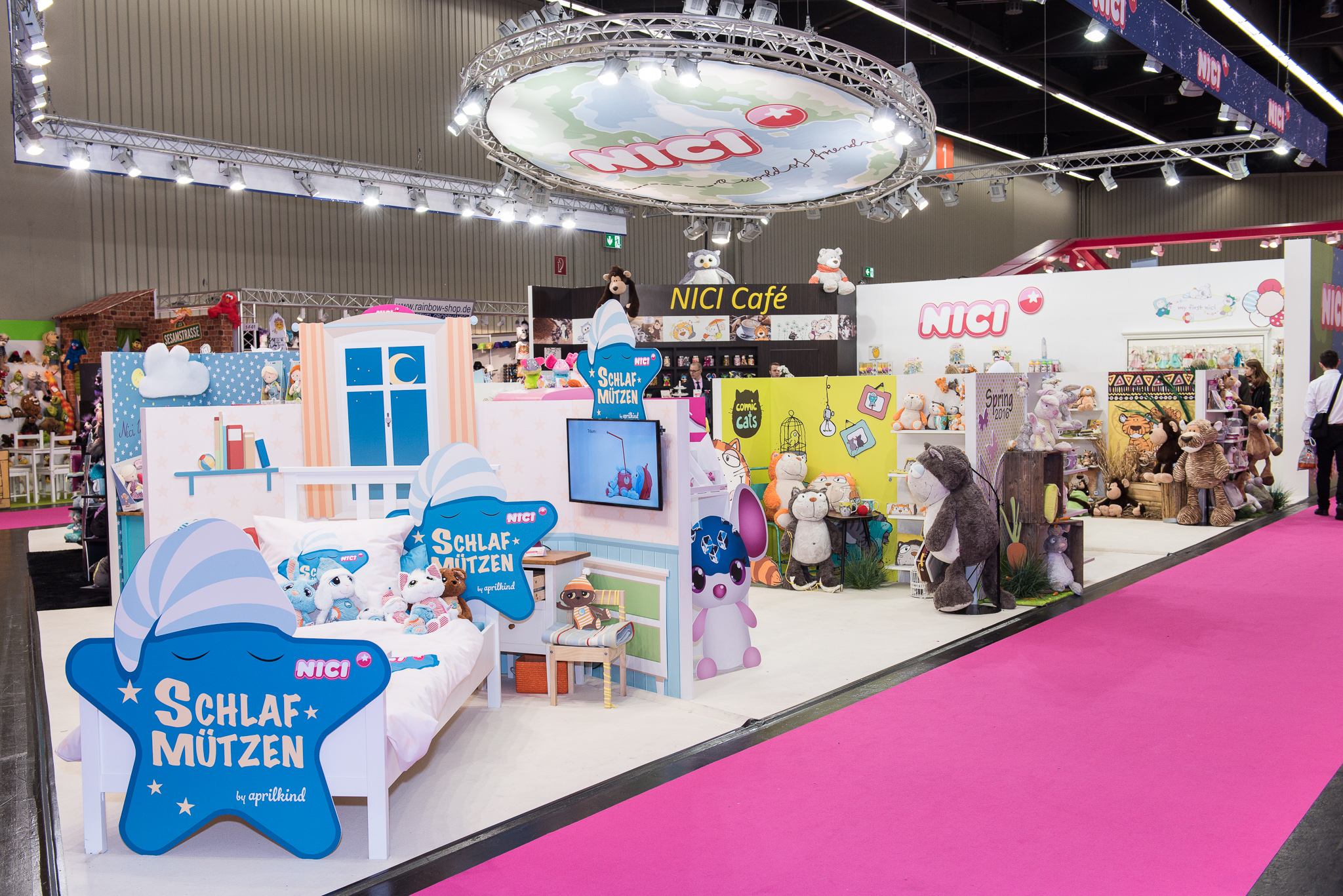
NICI booth at the 2016 International Toy Fair, Nuremberg

NICI has approximately 400 employees. It operates 30 gift shops in Germany and six gift shops in Asia. It maintains distribution partners in over 50 countries.
