= Cut Killer =

Moroccan-French Dj (born 1971)

- Born: Anouar Hajoui; 6 May 1971 (age 55)
- Origin: Meknes, Morocco
- Genres: Hip-hop
- Occupations: DJ; record producer; actor
- Years active: 1994–present
- Website: www.djcutkiller

Anouar Hajoui (Arabic: أنور حجوي, Anūr Ḥājawī; born 6 May 1971), better known as DJ Cut Killer or simply Cut Killer, is a Moroccan-French DJ and record producer with a versatile repertoire of hip-hop music. He is considered one of France's biggest DJs.

Hajoui grew his international fame, particularly in the United States of America, through invitations from DJ Big Dawg Pitbulls of Funkmaster Flex and Shadyville DJ's of rapper 50 Cent. For more than fifteen years, he has been one of the leading DJs in French hip hop.

== Early life ==
Anouar Hajoui was born in Meknes, Morocco in 1971. As a young Parisian who loved music and a activist who wholeheartedly embraced the emerging Parisian movement. He joined IZB, the first association to promote the hip-hop and organize concerts, and put down scratches on Original MC's 1991 album. He performed a memorable role as himself in a scene from the cult movie La Haine. He was a DJ for MC Solaar's concerts, scratcher on IAM member Akhenaton's solo album, and a radio show on Radio Nova.

== Career ==
In the middle of the 1990s, Cut Killer had already become a well-respected and active DJ. He adapted and consolidated New York hip-hop in France through many of his mix tapes, mixing the latest releases and freestyles of French rap, they became favorites and collector's items. The big number of top brass of the second generation of French rap went through this: Sages Poètes de la Rue, Lunatic, 113 and many others. The Hip Hop Soul Party series, composed of double mixed CDs, started in 1996 at MCA's. From the second volume on, exclusive tracks began to appear from Fabe, Busta Flex, among others, with one CD dedicated to hip-hop, the other to R&B. In volume three, a CD was dedicated to international hip-hop, the other to French hip-hop.

Killer, after the death of his rapper mate, East, established a label called Double H (for Hip-Hop) as a merchandising company and then a production label. In a few years, HH became one of the most influential independent labels on the market. When shifting from Universal to Small (Sony), the Hip-Hop Soul Party project became the Cut Killer Show with a first double CD published in 1997 (containing an outro by Jamel Debbouze), followed in 1998 by Operation Freestyle, a record fully dedicated to French underground. In 1999, Cut Killer and his associates produced R&B 2000, the collective album Double H DJ Crew, but also highly respected artists such as Fabe, Doudou Masta and 113, who managed to make their album Les Princes de la Ville a platinum record to end up winning two "Victoires de la Musique" (French music awards) in 2000. Double H is still developing with a team of street marketing, a clothing line "HH Wear", a publishing company called "Eastory Editions", followed by another production and publishing label "Eastory Production". Besides, Killer is booked by Chaos Prod agency, created by his brother Chakri.

As The Hip-Hop Soul Party and Cut Killer Show series reached the top of the charts and brought in gold and platinum awards, Cut Killer delegated R&B to his longtime accomplice, DJ Abdel, West Coast music to the specialist DJ Cream, and gave himself a try with dancehall Ragga Killa Show, before coming back to the French sound with 1 Son 2 Rue. Over the years, Cut Killer made or produced about twenty mixed albums.

Fond of the cinema, Cut Killer mixed music in La Haine, where he played music from Édith Piaf and NTM on KRS-One's beat. Many offers followed and he signed several tracks on the OSTs of Zak Fishman's Gamer, Fred Garson's The Dancer, and Miguel Courtois' Un Ange. He signed the complete score for Fabrice Genstal's La Squale, with Herve Rakoto and Sofiane Le Cat's, followed by Le Raid (Djamel Bensallah), Trois Zéro (Fabien Onteniente), Peau d’Ange (Vincent Perez)...

In the middle of the decade, Cut Killer returned to the fundamentals of dee-jaying on radio, and after four years on Radio Nova, he joined Skyrock, where he has a weekly show the best of global hip-hop evolution. He became the first French DJ booked in the USA through Funkmaster Flex' DJ Big Dawg Pitbulls and 50 Cent's Shadyville DJs.

Cut Killer mixes urban style, with rock, pop, and reggae, in venues in Asia, Europe, USA, and Australia bringing down barriers the barriers of language and geography.

== Discography ==
=== Mixtapes ===
- 2009: New Jack Collect-or
- 2009: East & Fabe
- 2008: Tribute II
- 2007: Street Français 4
- 2007: Mixtape Trailer
- 2007: Psychanalyse avant l'album
- 2007: Summer Tour 2007
- 2006: Street Français 2
- 2006: Street Français 3
- 2006: Opération Freestyle Maroc 2006
- 2006: Evolution
- 2006: Un Combat Sans Fin Part 2
- 2005: Street Français 1
- 2005: Lunatic
- 2004: Live Milan
- 2003: International hustler
- 2003: rnb 11
- 2003: Summer Tour 2003
- 2002: 1 Son 2 Rue
- 2002: LIVE JAY-Z
- 2002: 1 son 2 rue freestyle 3
- 2002: New Jack réedition
- 2001: Triptik
- 2001: Ouragan
- 2001: RNB 9
- 2001: Mix du dragon
- 2000: Freestyle Canada
- 2000: comité 2 brailleur
- 2001: La Tempête
- 2001: Live Portugal
- 1999: HH DJ Crew
- 1999: Les liens sacres
- 1999: Live bad boy
- 1999: Pitt Bull Street Team
- 1998: Freestyle 2 vol 3 Province
- 1998: Freestyle 2 Vol 1 Paris
- 1998: Live Vevey Suisse
- 1998: Freestyle 2 vol 2 Banlieues
- 1997: Cut Killer Party Jam
- 1997: Afro Jazz
- 1997: D.Abuz Suspects
- 1996: Hip Hop Summer Jam 96
- 1996: Hip Jop Never Die
- 1996: Timide et Sans Compexe Boogotop
- 1996: Hip Hop Summer Jam
- 1996: La Cliqua
- 1996: Un Combat Sans Fin Part 2
- 1996: Represent
- 1995: Freestyle
- 1995: Keep It Real
- 1995: Cut Killer Tape 7
- 1995: Les Lunatics
- 1995: Ménage à 3
- 1995: Mixtape N°14
- 1994: 19361

=== Albums ===
- 2003: Hip hop Soul Party 6
- 2003: Party Jam
- 2003: Mastamorphoze
- 2003: HH Classics volume 1
- 2002: Ragga Killa Show
- 2002: La Rage de Dire
- 2002: Le Prologue
- 2001: Double H Dj Crew
- 2001: Hip Hop Soul Party 5
- 2001: Cut Killer Show 2
- 2001: R&B 2000 International
- 2000: Hip Hop Soul Party 4
- 1998: Cut Killer Show
- 1998: Opération Freestyle
- 1998: Détournement de Son
- 1998: Trop Loin
- 1998: Eastwoo
- 1997: Mal Partis
- 1996: Hip Hop Soul Party 1
- 1996: Hip Hop Soul Party 2
- 1996: Hip hop Soul Party 3

=== Film themes (OST) ===
- 1995 : La Haine, Mathieu Kassovitz (1 titre)
- 2000 : Gamer, Valentin Rousseau (3 titres)
- 2000 : The Dancer, Fred Garson (post synchro)
- 2001 : Un ange, Michel Courtois (1 titre)
- 2001 : La squale, Fabrice Genestal (intégralité)

=== Participations ===
- 2004 : Liberté d'expression 2
- 2005 : Comités de brailleurs

=== DVDs ===
- 2002 : DJ School feat. Various DJs
- 2004 : DVDeejay feat. Various DJs
- 2004 : RnB invasion
- 2005 : The Cut Killer Show

=== Clubs appearances & residences ===
- Base Club (Dubai)
- Palais (Cannes)
- Boudoir (Dubai)
- VIP Room (Cannes, Paris, St Tropez)
- St Germain (Zurich)
- Platinum (Geneva)
- NOXX (Anvers)
- Kiss & Fly (New York)
- B Club (Moscow)
- Chinawhite (London)
- Pacha (Ibiza)
- Pacha (Marrakech)
- Bora Bora (Sousse)
- Via Notte (Porto Vecchio)
- Karement (Monaco)
- Planches (Deauville)
- Dune (Toulouse)
- Macumba
- Indochine (Zurich)
- Bar Rouge (Shanghai)
- Mix (Beijing)
- Mint (Hong Kong)
- Zone Club (Prishtina, Kosovo)

He also mixed for: Nike, MTV, Foot Locker, SNCF, PlayStation, Sobieski, Europa, Toyota, Première, Nintendo, Canal +, J&B, Adidas, Philips, Chaumet, Chopard, Agnès B, Puma, Louis Vuitton, Universal, Sony, Apple, Blackberry

== Filmography ==
=== Actor ===
- 1995: La Haine as DJ
- 1998: Hang the DJ as himself
- 2000: The Dancer as DJ Atomic
- 2006: Arthur et les Minimoys as DJ Easy Low (uncredited)
- 2008: 9 – Un chiffre, un homme as himself

=== Composer ===
- 2000: La squale

== See also ==
- List of French hip hop artists
