= DJ Abdel =

French DJ and record producer (born 1970)

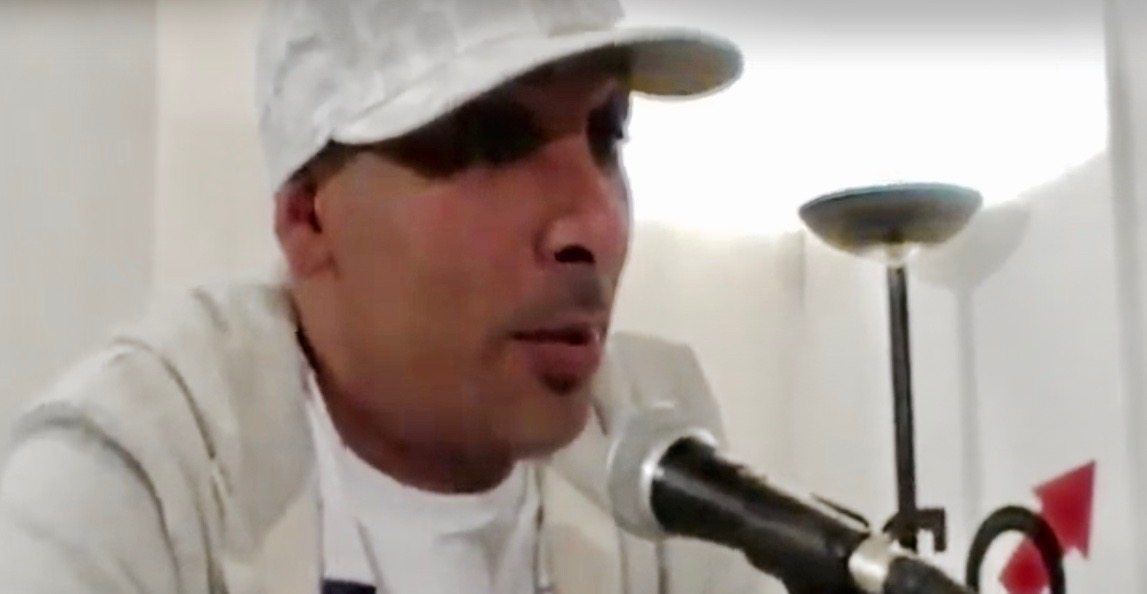

Background information
- Born: Abdel-illa Lamriq; June 5, 1970 (age 55); Casablanca, Morocco
- Origin: Casablanca, Morocco
- Genres: Hip hop Funk; Contemporary R&B; Pop rap
- Years active: 1994-present
- Label: Universal Music
- Website: www.djabdel.com

Abdel-illa Lamriq (born 5 June 1970) better known by his stage name DJ Abdel, is a Moroccan-French DJ and record producer based in France. Abdel primarily releases hip-hop, pop rap, funk, and contemporary R&B.

== Career ==
DJ Abdel became known through his musical participation in the French Canal+ television show Nulle Part Ailleurs as a member of its band. He joined Dee Nasty and the dance troupe "Black Blanc Beur" (also known as B3) in touring. He also collaborated with DJ Cut Killer in forming "Double H Productions" that produced many albums most notably for 113, a French hip hop group with African and Caribbean roots.

He has broadcast music mixes on several French radio stations including on his own daily show on Fun Radio. He DJs in NRJ with a weekly show "Master Mix" and 1-hour weekly show on FG DJ Radio. His musical style is a mix of hip hop, funk, pop rap, and contemporary R&B.

He wrote the musical parts for the French sitcom H and French animated series Funky Cops. He also took part in writing music materials for films including Zak Fishman's Gamer, Fabrice Genstal's La Squale, Thomas Girou's sequel of La Vérité si je mens ! and in 2005 Merzak Allouache's Bab el web.

In October 2007, DJ Abdel officiated at the French Star Academy, on TF1, as Official DJ.

== Discography ==
=== Albums ===
Year	Album	Peak positions		
Year	Album	FR	BEL (Wa)	SUI
2001	A L'Ancienne 1	–	–	–
2002	A L'Ancienne 2	–	–	–
2011	Evolution	10	51	–
2015	Double Face 2015	27	–	–

Mixes

Year	Album	Peak positions		
Year	Album	FR)	BEL (Wa)	SUI
1999	Collectif Rap 2 (mixed by DJ Abdel and DJ Djel)	–	–	14
2000	R'n'B 2000 International (mixed by Cut Killer and DJ Abdel)	32	–	–

- Hip Hop Party Soul V (with DJ Cut Killer)
- Total R'N'B 1
- Total R'N'B 2
- Hip Hop Party Soul VI

=== Singles ===
Year	Single	Peak positions	
Year	Single	FR	BEL (Wa)
2001	"Only Thing I Need" (DJ Abdel feat. Jérome Prister & Doudou Masta)	61	–
2002	"Funky Cops: Let's Boogie" (DJ Abdel feat. James D. Train & Jérôme Prister)	41	–
2002	"Get Down Samedi Soir" (DJ Abdel feat. Rohff & Oliver Cheatham)	42	–
2008	"All We Need" (DJ Abdel - Loïs Andréa - Big Ali)	65	–
2011	"Funk You" (DJ Abdel & Mister You feat. Francisco)	12	2 (Ultratip*)
2011	"C'est ma life" (DJ Abdel feat. Soprano)	26	11 (Ultratip*)
2011	"Donnez-nous de la funk" (DJ Abdel feat. Wati Funk)	–	–
2011	"Bye Bye Sonyé" (DJ Abdel feat. Indila)	–	–
2011	"Pas de nouvelle, bonne nouvelle" (DJ Abdel feat. Maître Gims and Black Mesrimes)	84	–
2013	"Funk You 2" (DJ Abdel feat. Mister You, Francisco & Big Ali)	118	24 (Ultratip*)
2015	"Fais le moonwalk" (DJ Abdel, Soprano and Jul)	50	40 (Ultratip*)
2021	"C.M.B.B (c'est Marseille bébé)" (DJ Abdel x Medi Meyz feat. Kofs)	139	–

*Did not appear in the official Belgian Ultratop 50 charts, but rather in the bubbling under Ultratip charts.

=== Film soundtracks ===
- 1998: H (TV series) (composer)
- 2001: La vérité si je mens! 2 (composer)
- 2005: Bab el web (composer)
- 2006: Arthur et les Minimoys

== Filmography ==
- Funky Cops (2002–04) (music for the French series)
