= Dollarman =

Grenadian singer, songwriter, producer and musician

- Born: Grenada
- Occupations: Singer; Songwriter; Producers
- Years active: 1990s–present

Dollarman is a Grenadian singer, songwriter, producer and musician born in Grenada. Since moving to Brooklyn, New York, he continues to present hits with a Caribbean influence and reggae.

== Career ==
In the early 1990s, he recorded his first two tracks, "Long Time Lover" and "Driver" on the Rockers Forever record label. He also performed live at clubs and bars in New York and became well recognized on the Underground Brooklyn Reggae music scene for over 10 years.

In 2003, Dollarman was featured on the "Money" track of Easy Star Record's Reggae/Dub tribute version of Pink Floyd's album The Dark Side of the Moon titled Dub Side of the Moon. Due to the album's success, Dollarman started appearing in US and European venues. He was featured as a Dancehall artist on "Rock This Party (Everybody Dance Now)" released by Bob Sinclar and Cutee B featuring Dollarman, Big Ali and Makedah. The song stayed at No. 1 for 4 weeks on the Ultratop 40 Belgian charts, going gold.

Dollarman was awarded a gold plaque at the 2006 MTV Europe's The Music Factory (TMF) Awards held in Amsterdam, where he also performed. In 2007, it became a No. 1 hit in Billboard's Hot Dance Club Songs. The song is featured on Sinclar's album Western Dream released on the Tommy Boy Label. Another big collaboration with Sinclar included the release of "Sound of Freedom" with Bob Sinclar and Cutee B featuring Gary Pine and Dollarman which went to No. 1 on US Hot Dance Club Songs and was a top 5 hit in many European charts.

Based on these international successes, Dollarman performed in many European clubs. He followed that international hit in 2007 with another song produced by Bob Sinclar entitled "Let Yourself Free", a remake of the 1991 hit "Everybody's Free (To Feel Good)" by Rozalla. It was yet again a hit in the Billboard dance charts. After a remix of Ace of Base classic "All That She Wants", for the Ministry of Sound, he had another massive hit with "Hit the Floor", a remake of the hit song "The Power" by Snap!. It is credited to Big Ali featuring Dollarman. It peaked at No. 4 on the Billboard dance charts.

In 2010, Dollarman released a new reggae song feat. Melody. Entitled "You've change", it is found on "Love the Music" compilation CD set released in June 2010.

== Discography ==
=== Singles ===
- 2006: "Rock This Party (Everybody Dance Now)" by Bob Sinclar and Cutee B featuring Dollarman, Big Ali and Makedah.
  - Topped the Belgian Singles Chart, Czech Dance Chart, Hungarian Singles Chart and US Hot Dance Club Play; No. 2 Romanian Airplay; No. 3 UK Singles Chart, Eurochart Hot 100, Finland Singles Chart, France Singles Chart; No. 4 Irish and Swiss Singles Chart; No. 5 New Zealand Charts; No. 6 Australia; No. 12 The Netherlands and Austria; No. 14 in Italy and Sweden; No. 16 in Norway, No. 18 in Germany and No. 19 in Denmark
- 2007: "Sound of Freedom" by Bob Sinclar and Cutee B featuring Gary Pine and Dollarman
  - Topped US Hot Dance Club Play; Reached No. 2 in Finland, No. 4 in French Airplay Chart; No. 6 in French SNEP Singles Chart; No. 8 in Denmark, No. 9 in Belgium and the Netherlands; No. 12 in UK Singles Chart, No. 22 in Australia, No. 29 in Italy, No. 31 in Switzerland, No. 39 in Austria and No. 52 in Sweden
- 2008: "Hit the Floor" by Big Ali featuring Dollarman
- 2009: "Head Over Heels" by Larry McDonald (percussionist) featuring Dollarman MCPR Music
- 2010: "You've change" by Dollarman featuring Singing Melody
- 2010: "Spanish Lover" by Akcent featuring Dollarman
