= World, Hold On (Children of the Sky) =

2006 single by Bob Sinclar

Single by Bob Sinclar featuring Steve Edwards

from the album Western Dream
- Released: 17 April 2006
- Length: 6:41 (album version); 3:22 (radio edit)
- Label: Yellow Productions; Defected
- Songwriters: Steve Edwards; Bob Sinclar; Michaël Tordjman
- Producers: Bob Sinclar; Michell

Bob Sinclar singles chronology
"Love Generation" (2005)	"World, Hold On (Children of the Sky)" (2006)	"Rock This Party (Everybody Dance Now)" (2006)

Music video
- "World, Hold On (Children of the Sky)" on YouTube

"World, Hold On (Children of the Sky)" is a song by French music producer and DJ Bob Sinclar, featuring Steve Edwards. It was released as the second single from Sinclar's Western Dream album, on 17 April 2006. Following its release, the song reached number one in Hungary and Romania, peaked at number nine on the UK Singles Chart, and became a top-10 hit in 10 other European countries, including Sinclar's native France, where it peaked at number two. On the US Billboard Dance Club Songs chart, the track reached number one in July 2006. An E-Smoove-produced remix of the song was nominated for a 2007 Grammy Award for Best Remixed Recording, Non-Classical.

== Music video ==
David Beaudoin making a plan to rescue the Earth.

The music video includes the same boy (David Beaudoin) from Sinclar's "Love Generation" and "Rock This Party" music clips. In the video, the boy wakes up and notices on the news that the Earth is going to be destroyed by a meteor. He decides to build a space ship of his own and takes his dog with him in the space ship. During the construction of the spaceship, toys came out from under the boy's bed, and start dancing, while Bob Sinclar appears in the video as a tiny person playing "World, Hold On (Children of the Sky)" using cookies as records. The boy takes no notice of either the toys or Bob Sinclar. The boy then launches the space ship and shoots through the Solar System. The Solar System looks exactly like the poster in the boy's room. All the planets are labeled with information including diameter and other facts. In outer space, he sees the meteor approaching the Earth. He fires hundreds of basketballs at the meteor, destroys it, and saves the earth. He then lands the spaceship in his room. Back on Earth, he gets a reward and media coverage, presenting him as a hero. While he is getting praise, his mother comes and kisses him on the cheek. This wakes him up and causes him to realize that it was all a dream.

== Track listings ==
1. World, Hold On (Video Edit) – 3:35
2. World, Hold On (Radio Edit) – 3:21
3. World, Hold On (Club Mix) – 8:05
4. World, Hold On (Extended Club Mix) – 8:35

== Official remixes ==
The song has received several official remixes over the years. The first formal remix, by Vintage Culture, was released in 2018. Two official remixes were released in 2021, one by Tom Staar and one by DJ Kone and Mark Palacios. A fourth official remix was done by Fisher, and released on Yellow Productions in 2022.

== Chart performance ==
"World, Hold On (Children of the Sky)" entered the UK Singles Chart at number nine, its peak, in July. The song was also a success for Bob Sinclar's career. It was a number-one hit in Italy and reached the top 10 in several other countries, including Belgium, Denmark, Ireland, Finland, the Netherlands, and the UK. It peaked within the top 20 in Australia, Austria, Germany, Norway, Spain, Sweden, and Switzerland. The song also became Bob Sinclar's second number-one single on the US Billboard Hot Dance Club Play chart.

=== Weekly charts ===
Chart (2006)	Peak position
Australia (ARIA)	19
Austria (Ö3 Austria Top 40)	17
Belgium (Ultratop 50 Flanders)	3
Belgium (Ultratop 50 Wallonia)	3
Belgium Dance (Ultratop Flanders)	1
CIS Airplay (TopHit)	5
Czech Republic Airplay (ČNS IFPI)	8
Denmark (Tracklisten)	9
Europe (Eurochart Hot 100)	4
Finland (Suomen virallinen lista)	7
France (SNEP)	2
Germany (GfK)	19
Greece (IFPI)	6
Hungary (Rádiós Top 40)	1
Ireland (IRMA)	10
Italy (FIMI)	4
Netherlands (Dutch Top 40)	5
Netherlands (Single Top 100)	8
Norway (VG-lista)	15
Poland (Airplay Chart)	1
Romania (Romanian Top 100)	1
Russia Airplay (TopHit)	5
Scottish Singles Sales (Official Charts)	7
Slovakia Airplay (ČNS IFPI)	2
Spain (Promusicae)	13
Sweden (Sverigetopplistan)	14
Switzerland (Schweizer Hitparade)	12
UK Singles (Official Charts)	9
UK Dance (Official Charts)	2
UK Indie (Official Charts)	1
US Dance Club Songs (Billboard)	1
US Dance Airplay (Billboard)	10

Chart (2024–2026)	Peak position
Brazil Hot 100 (Billboard)	46
Global 200 (Billboard)	152
Greece International (IFPI)	17
Portugal (AFP)	97

=== Year-end charts ===
Chart (2006)	Position
Austria (Ö3 Austria Top 40)	69
Belgium (Ultratop 50 Flanders)	17
Belgium (Ultratop 50 Wallonia)	15
CIS Airplay (TopHit)	11
Europe (Eurochart Hot 100)	32
France (SNEP)	29
Germany (Media Control GfK)	88
Italy (FIMI)	15
Netherlands (Dutch Top 40)	34
Netherlands (Single Top 100)	38
Russia Airplay (TopHit)	11
Switzerland (Schweizer Hitparade)	42
UK Singles (OCC)	107
US Dance Club Play (Billboard)	1

=== Decade-end charts ===
Chart (2000–2009)	Position
Russia Airplay (TopHit)	103

== Certifications ==
Region	Certification	Certified units/sales
Australia (ARIA) Fisher rework	Platinum	70,000^{‡}
Belgium (BRMA)	Gold	25,000^{*}
Denmark (IFPI Danmark)	Gold	4,000^{^}
Italy (FIMI)	Platinum	100,000^{‡}
New Zealand (RMNZ)	Platinum	30,000^{‡}
Spain (Promusicae)	Gold	30,000^{‡}
United Kingdom (BPI)	Silver	200,000^{‡}
United Kingdom (BPI) Fisher rework	2× Platinum	1,200,000^{‡}
Streaming
Greece (IFPI Greece) Fisher rework	3× Platinum	6,000,000^{†}
^{*} Sales figures based on certification alone.^{^} Shipments figures based on certification alone.^{‡} Sales+streaming figures based on certification alone.^{†} Streaming-only figures based on certification alone.

== Release history ==
Region	Date	Format(s)	Label(s)	Ref.
Belgium	17 April 2006	CD	Yellow Productions; N.E.W.S.	
Netherlands	17 April 2006	CD	Yellow Productions; N.E.W.S.	
Australia	5 June 2006	CD	Hussle	
United Kingdom	3 July 2006	CD	Defected	

== See also ==
- List of number-one dance singles of 2006 (U.S.)
- List of Romanian Top 100 number ones of the 2000s
