= Love Generation (song) =

2005 single by Bob Sinclar featuring Gary Pine

Single by Bob Sinclar featuring Gary Pine

from the album Western Dream
- Released: 19 September 2005
- Length: 8:55 (album version); 3:39 (radio/video version); 2:58 (radio edit)
- Label: Yellow Productions; Defected
- Songwriters: Duane Harden; Christophe le Friant; Gary Pine; Jay Woodhouse; JG Schreiner; Alain Wisniak
- Producer: Bob Sinclar

Bob Sinclar singles chronology
"You Could Be My Lover" (2004)	"Love Generation" (2005)	"World, Hold On (Children of the Sky)" (2006)

Alternative cover
- German, Austrian and Swiss artwork, featuring 2006 FIFA World Cup mascots Goleo VI and Pille

Audio sample
- Love Generation: file; help

Music video
- "Love Generation" on YouTube

"Love Generation" is a song by French music producer and DJ Bob Sinclar featuring vocals from Gary Pine, included on Sinclar's fourth studio album, Western Dream. The single was released in September 2005 through the Yellow Productions label and became a hit in Europe and Australia, topping the charts of five countries as well as the Hungarian and US dance charts. It was less popular in the United Kingdom, reaching number 12 there, and was featured on many Ministry of Sound albums of the time and had much rotation on MTV Dance.

== Chart performance ==
The song topped the charts of Australia, Austria, Flanders, the Czech Republic, and Germany. It entered the top 10 in several other countries, including Denmark, France, Hungary, Italy, the Netherlands, New Zealand, Spain, Sweden and Switzerland.

== Music video ==
The music video is inspired by the music video for "Sweet Lullaby" by Deep Forest. Both videos feature children riding their bicycle across different locations, greeting the local people and sampling the local cultures and atmosphere.

The music video, which appears to have been shot at various locations in the United States, starts with a young boy (played by David Beaudoin, who stars in numerous Bob Sinclar videos) waking up one seemingly ordinary morning. He gets himself ready and goes out on his bike to school. He arrives outside the entrance and pauses, apparently in thought. Then he rides the bike on, past the school, and partakes on a trip to many different and exotic locations all over the USA including New York City, Los Angeles and San Francisco. He waves to people he passes, rests occasionally for refreshments and to admire his surroundings, before riding on. The man watering his lawn is Sinclar.

Eventually he ends up back at his home at the time he usually gets back from school. He embraces and chats animatedly to his mother, and she brings him to bed later. He looks thoughtfully at the globe at his bedside table, before rolling over to sleep. Overall the video tells the story of an adventure in the wild outdoors and how a boy spreads love all over his nation.

== FIFA version ==
In Germany, Austria and Switzerland, a special CD single was issued to coincide with the draws for the 2006 FIFA World Cup, with animated mascots Goleo VI and Pille appearing on both the cover of FIFA single release and in the accompanying music video. This release was credited to "Bob Sinclar presents Goleo VI featuring Gary 'Nesta' Pine" and was used throughout the World Cup event.

== Track listings ==
1. "Love Generation" (radio edit)
2. "Love Generation" (club mix)
3. "Love Generation" (Full Intention mix)
4. "Love Generation" (Full Intention dub)
5. "Love Generation" (Ron Carroll Black Church Feeling)
6. "Love Generation" (Kenny Dope Gutta remix)
- Australasian release
1. "Love Generation" (Radio Edit)
2. "Love Generation" (Extended Club Version)

German, Austrian and Swiss CD single

1. "Love Generation" (radio edit) – 3:32
2. "Love Generation" (main club mix) – 8:46
3. "Love Generation" (Kenny Dope Gutta remix) – 6:58
4. "Love Generation" (Antoine Clamaran remix) – 9:26
5. "Love Generation" (video clip)

== Charts ==
=== Weekly charts ===
Chart (2005–2006)	Peak position
Australia (ARIA)	1
Austria (Ö3 Austria Top 40)	1
Belgium (Ultratop 50 Flanders)	1
Belgium (Ultratop 50 Wallonia)	2
Canada CHR/Pop Top 40 (Radio & Records)	15
CIS Airplay (TopHit)	5
Czech Republic Airplay (ČNS IFPI)	1
Denmark (Tracklisten)	3
Europe (Eurochart Hot 100)	2
Finland (Suomen virallinen lista)	13
France (SNEP)	3
Germany (GfK)	1
Greece (IFPI)	10
Hungary (Rádiós Top 40)	2
Hungary (Dance Top 40)	1
Ireland (IRMA)	14
Italy (FIMI)	9
Netherlands (Dutch Top 40)	2
Netherlands (Single Top 100)	3
New Zealand (Recorded Music NZ)	2
Norway (VG-lista)	13
Romania (Romanian Top 100)	11
Russia Airplay (TopHit)	5
Scottish Singles Sales (Official Charts)	9
Spain (Promusicae)	6
Sweden (Sverigetopplistan)	2
Switzerland (Schweizer Hitparade)	2
UK Dance (Official Charts)	2
UK Singles (Official Charts)	12
US Dance Club Songs (Billboard)	1

Chart (2020)	Peak position
Poland Airplay (ZPAV)	80

Chart (2025)	Peak position
Kazakhstan Airplay (TopHit)	86

=== Year-end charts ===
Chart (2005)	Position
Belgium (Ultratop 50 Flanders)	5
Belgium (Ultratop 50 Wallonia)	17
CIS Airplay (TopHit)	74
Europe (Eurochart Hot 100)	50
Italy (FIMI)	46
Netherlands (Dutch Top 40)	20
Netherlands (Single Top 100)	19
Russia Airplay (TopHit)	67
UK Singles (OCC)	104

Chart (2006)	Position
Australia (ARIA)	12
Austria (Ö3 Austria Top 40)	2
Belgium (Ultratop 50 Flanders)	40
Belgium (Ultratop 50 Wallonia)	92
CIS Airplay (TopHit)	149
Europe (Eurochart Hot 100)	6
Germany (Media Control GfK)	1
Hungary (Dance Top 40)	7
Hungary (Rádiós Top 40)	3
Netherlands (Dutch Top 40)	56
Netherlands (Single Top 100)	85
New Zealand (RIANZ)	12
Russia Airplay (TopHit)	142
Sweden (Hitlistan)	46
Switzerland (Schweizer Hitparade)	3
US Dance Club Play (Billboard)	13

=== Decade-end charts ===
Chart (2000–2009)	Position
Germany (Media Control GfK)	6

== Certifications ==
Region	Certification	Certified units/sales
Australia (ARIA)	Platinum	70,000^{^}
Austria (IFPI Austria)	Gold	15,000^{*}
Belgium (BRMA)	Platinum	50,000^{*}
Denmark (IFPI Danmark)	Platinum	8,000^{^}
France (SNEP)	Silver	100,000^{*}
Italy (FIMI)	Gold	35,000^{‡}
New Zealand (RMNZ)	Platinum	30,000^{‡}
Spain (Promusicae)	Gold	30,000^{‡}
Sweden (GLF)	Gold	10,000^{^}
Switzerland (IFPI Switzerland)	Gold	20,000^{^}
United Kingdom (BPI)	Silver	200,000^{‡}
^{*} Sales figures based on certification alone.^{^} Shipments figures based on certification alone.^{‡} Sales+streaming figures based on certification alone.

== Release history ==
Region	Date	Format(s)	Label(s)	Ref.
Belgium	19 September 2005	Digital download EP	Yellow Productions	
France	2005	12-inch vinyl; CD	Yellow Productions	
United Kingdom	10 October 2005	12-inch vinyl; CD	Defected	
Australia	23 January 2006	CD	Hussle	
