= Queen Ifrica =

- Also known as: Fyah Muma
- Born: Ventrice Morgan; 25 March 1975 (age 50); Montego Bay, Jamaica
- Genres: Reggae, dancehall
- Occupations: Singer-songwriter, DJ
- Years active: 1995–present
- Labels: Flames Productions; VP Records; Penthouse Records

Ventrice Morgan (born 25 March 1975), better known by the stage name Queen Ifrica, is a reggae singer and disc jockey from the hills above Montego Bay, Jamaica. She is the daughter of ska musician Derrick Morgan but was raised by her mother and stepfather.

A Rasta by faith, she is known for her work in that community. While some of her songs are about deeply personal subject matter such as "Below the Waist" and "Daddy," she also moves forward a strong social critique in songs such as "Tyad A Dah Sumn Yah" and "Serve and Protect."

== Biography ==
Queen Ifrica began her career in 1995 after shining at a local talent contest in her hometown of Montego Bay, Jamaica. This eye-opening experience eventually led to major stage performances in her country including the esteemed Reggae Sumfest as well as a union with Tony Rebel’s Flames Crew in 1998.

With roots firmly secured in the Rastafarian faith, she blossomed as one of the top cultural artists in reggae, swarming the airwaves with hits like “Randy”, “Jus My Brethren”, “Below the Waist” and “Daddy” and stealing the stages at major festivals and stage shows around the world (Summer Jam in Germany, Sierra Nevada World Music Festival, Bob Marley Festival, Reggae on the River in California and Reggae Sundance Festival in Holland). As an active community leader, Ifrica is involved in several outreach programs for children in Jamaica's inner-city and charity shows where proceeds are donated to the cause.

She signed a record deal with VP Records, leading to the release of her first album, Montego Bay, in July 2009. Her second album, Climb, was released in March 2017, and topped the Billboard Reggae Albums chart.

== Discography ==
- Montego Bay (2009), VP Records
- Climb (2017), VP Records
