= Sound of Freedom (song) =

Single by Bob Sinclar and Cutee B featuring Gary Pine and Dollarman

from the album Soundz of Freedom
- Released: 2 April 2007 (FR); 4 June 2007 (UK)
- Recorded: 2006
- Genre: House, reggae fusion, dancehall
- Length: 4:05 (Album Version); 3:17 (Radio Edit)
- Label: Yellow Productions; Ministry of Sound Australia
- Songwriters: Christophe le Friant, Gary Pine, Samuel Conrad, Francis Poulet, Duane Harden
- Producer: Bob Sinclar

Bob Sinclar singles chronology
"Everybody Movin'" (2007)	"Sound of Freedom" (2007)	"Lala Song" (2009)

Music video
- "Sound of Freedom" on YouTube

"Sound of Freedom" is a song by French music producer and DJ Bob Sinclar. It was released on April 2, 2007 as the lead single from his studio album Soundz of Freedom. The song features Gary Pine and Dollarman.

== Content ==
It also contains an interpolation of "Everybody's Free (To Feel Good)" by Rozalla.

== Charts ==
=== Weekly charts ===
Chart (2007)	Peak position
Australia (ARIA)	22
Austria (Ö3 Austria Top 40)	39
Belgium (Ultratop 50 Flanders)	9
Belgium (Ultratop 50 Wallonia)	16
Canada CHR/Top 40 (Billboard)	41
CIS Airplay (TopHit)	45
Czech Republic (Rádio – Top 100)	13
Denmark (Tracklisten)	8
Europe (Eurochart Hot 100)	17
Finland (Suomen virallinen lista)	2
France (SNEP)	6
Germany (GfK)	44
Hungary (Dance Top 40)	3
Hungary (Rádiós Top 40)	6
Hungary (Single Top 40)	2
Ireland (IRMA)	29
Italy (FIMI)	7
Netherlands (Dutch Top 40)	11
Netherlands (Single Top 100)	9
Russia Airplay (TopHit)	30
Scotland (OCC)	11
Slovakia (Rádio Top 100)	12
Sweden (Sverigetopplistan)	52
Switzerland (Schweizer Hitparade)	31
UK Singles (OCC)	14
UK Dance (OCC)	2
UK Indie (OCC)	1
US Dance Club Songs (Billboard)	1

=== Year-end charts ===
Year-end chart performance for "Sound of Freedom"
Chart (2007)	Position
CIS (TopHit)	125
Hungary (Dance Top 40)	33
Russia Airplay (TopHit)	123

== See also ==
- List of number-one dance singles of 2007 (U.S.)
