= Big Ali =

American singer, rapper and DJ (born 1978)

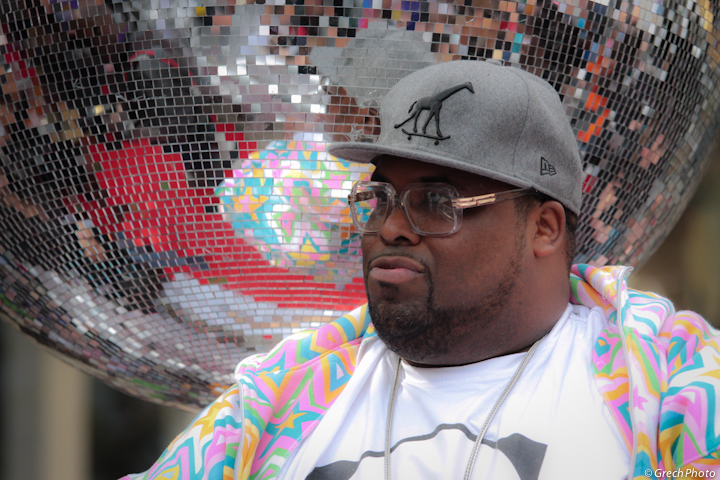
- Big Ali in 2011

Background information
- Also known as: Big Ali, Breakingz, Grimer
- Born: Ali Fitzgerald Moore; February 25, 1978 (age 48); New York City, New York, United States
- Genres: Hip hop; crunk; electro house; dance-pop
- Occupations: Singer; rapper; songwriter; DJ
- Years active: 2001–present
- Label: Up Music

Ali Fitzgerald Moore (born February 25, 1978), better known by his stage name Big Ali (formerly Breakingz and Grimer), is an American singer, rapper, and DJ born in New York. He has been based in Paris, France, since 2001. He is signed to Up Music, a Warner Music label.

== Career ==
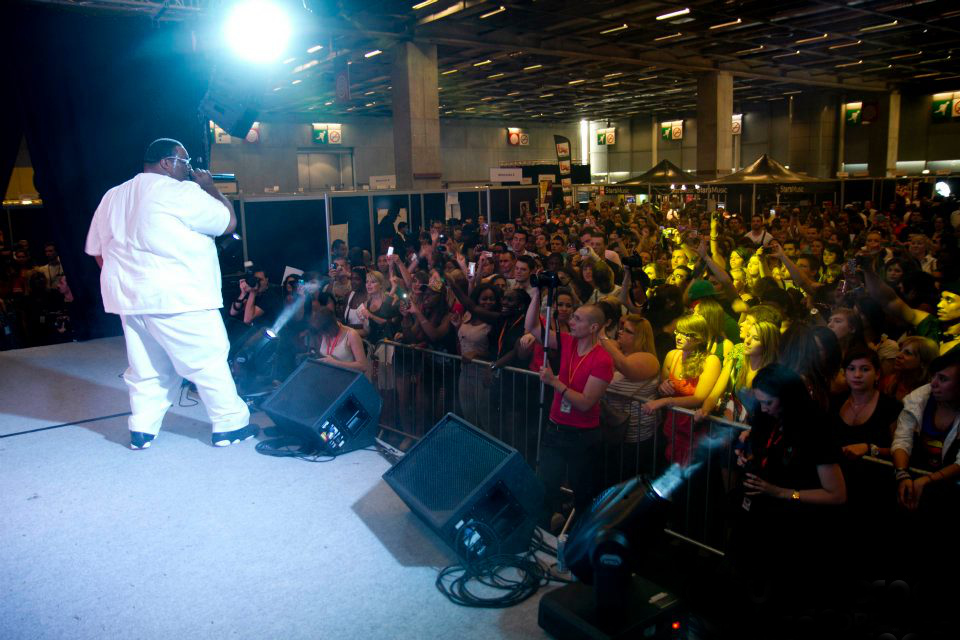
Big Ali at Music Expo 2011

Big Ali released his debut album Louder in May 2009. The album featured many French and international producers and artists. "Hit the Floor", released in October 2008, was the album's first single. It was followed by "Neon Music" in March 2009. A third single, "Universal Party", came out in November 2009.

In collaborations, the joint 2006 single "Rock This Party (Everybody Dance Now)" by Bob Sinclar and Cutee-B featuring Dollarman, Ali & Makedah stayed at #1 for four weeks on the Ultratop 40 Belgian charts. In 2007, it became a number one hit in Billboard's Hot Dance Club Songs.

Big Ali wrote his first lyrics at the age of 8. He created a crew of DJs called "World Famous Vynil Squad". He also had radio and TV collaborations, such as the radio show "Full Throttle", which featured Fatman Scoop. Big Ali also created the show Jumpoff, hosted by Ed Lover and Doctor Dré. He hosted his own show, "The Magic Hour", at Vassar College in New York.

Big Ali has also worked in club venues in the United States, Asia, Latin America, and Europe. He participated as an MC at the Cannes Film Festival. He has worked with many successful French artists such as Kool Shen, Amine, Jean-Roch, Kore & Scalp, Leslie, Magic System, Bob Sinclar with Rohff on the hit "Dirty Hous", Sinik, and Maude Harcheb on her song "Donne-Moi Le La".

== Discography ==
=== Albums ===
Year	Album	Charts	Certification	Track list
Year	Album	FR	Certification	Track list
2009	Louder	47		1. Hit the Floor (feat. Dollarman); 2. Hunger; 3. Shake It Up (feat. Kat DeLuna); 4. Neon Music 2009 (Remix 2009 by Soundshakerz); 5. Make Some Noïse; 6. Burn It Up (feat. Luckie D); 7. Universal Party (feat. Gramps Morgan); 8. Can We Cut; 9. Dancehall Queen (feat. Beenie Man); 10. High Energy; 11. Drop (feat. One World); 12. Here We Go Now; 13. Fun Time (feat. Chaka Demus & Pliers); 14. Des Larmes De Sang (feat. Florent Pagny); 15. I'm Sorry
2012	Urban Electro			

=== Solo singles ===
==== Charting ====
Year	Single	Charts								Album
Year	Single	FR	AUT	BEL (Vl) Ultratop	BEL (Vl) Ultratip	BEL (Wa) Ultratop	BEL (Wa) Ultratip*	GER	SWE	Album
2008	"All We Need" (DJ Abdel, Loïs Andréa and Big Ali)	65	—	—	—	—	—	—	—	
2009	"Hit the Floor" (feat. Dollarman)	—	46	34	—	—	Tip 9	19	24	
2009	"Neon Music Remix 2009"	—	—	—	—	—	Tip 13	—	—	
2010	"Universal Party (feat. Gramps Morgan) / Neon Music / Hit the Floor (feat. Dollarman)	24	—	—	—	—	—	—	—	
2011	"Distress (Sending Out An SOS)" (feat. Shana P.)	47	—	—	—	—	—	—	—	
2011	"Bring me Coconut" (feat. Gramps Morgan and Lucenzo)	—	—	—	—	—	—	—	—	
2012	"WatiBigAli" (feat. Wati B)	9	—	—	Tip 32	7	—	—	—	
2013	""Cœur de guerrier" (feat. Youssoupha, Corneille & Acid)	—	—	—	—	—	Tip 6	—	—	
2018	"Bottles Up" (Big Ali X Busta Rhymes X R-Wan)	10	—	—	—	—	—	—	—	

*Did not appear in the official Belgian Ultratop 50 charts, but rather in the bubbling under Ultratip charts.

=== Featuring ===
==== Charting ====
(Peak positions in parentheses)

Year	Single	Charts														Album
Year	Single	AUS	AUT	BEL (Vl)	BEL (Wa)	DEN	ESP	FIN	FR	ITA	NED	NOR	NZ	SWE	SWI	Album
2006	"C'chô, ça brûle" (Magic System, Akil, Cheb Bilal & Big Ali)	—	—	—	52	—	—	—	4	—	—	—	—	—	—	
2006	"Rock This Party (Everybody Dance Now)" (Bob Sinclar & Cutee-B feat. Dollarman, Big Ali & Makedah)	6	12	1	1	19	7	3	3	11	12	16	30	14	—	
2010	"Ce matin va être une pure soirée" (Fatal Bazooka feat. Big Ali, PzK, Dogg Soso & DJ Chris Prolls)	—	—	—	20	—	—	—	—	—	—	—	—	—	52	
2010	"Vem dançar kuduro" (Lucenzo feat. Big Ali)	—	—	—	—	14	—	12	2	—	—	15	—	1	31	
2012	"Lovumba" (Daddy Yankee feat. Big Ali)	—	—	—	—	—	—	—	135	—	—	—	—	—	—	
2013	"Funk You 2" (DJ Abdel feat. Mister You, Francisco & Big Ali)	—	—	—	74	—	—	—	118	—	—	—	—	—	—	
2014	"Boom Raka Tak" (Ardian Bujupi & DJ Mase feat. Big Ali & Lumidee)	—	—	—	—	—	—	—	—	—	—	—	—	—	—	Ardicted
2015	"Donne-Moi Le La" (Maude Harcheb feat. Big Ali	—	—	—	—	—	—	—	—	—	—	—	—	—	—	Donne-Moi Le La
2016	"Kiss Kiss" (Dj R'AN feat. Mohombi & Big Ali	—	—	—	—	—	—	—	—	—	—	—	—	—	—	

==== Others ====
- 2006: Midas Touch (with Matt Houston ) on the album Phoenix 2006
- 2006: 200 degrés (Zahouania, Cheb Bilal, Nessbeal)
- 2006: A moi la vie (Douzi, Justine, Six Coups MC)
- 2007: "Dirty House" Rohff with Big Ali) in the album La Résurrection (Banlieue South remix)
- 2008: "Stronger" (English version) / "Plus fort" (French version) (with Anggun) from her album Elevation
- 2008: "Habibi" (with Leslie and Amar)
- 2008: "Bienvenue chez les Bylkas" (with Sinik, Cheb Bilal)
- 2009: "No Stress" (with Laurent Wolf et DJ Snake)
- 2009: "New New New" (with Bob Sinclar) (Big Ali appears only in the music video for the song)
- 2009: "Groove On" (remix) (with Timati and Snoop Dogg)
- 2010: "Curse" (Jamie Drastik feat. David Rush and Big Ali)
- 2010: "Des larmes de sang" (with Florent Pagny)
- 2010: "Calypso" (DJ Snake feat. Big Ali)
- 2010: "Playground" (with DJ Assad and Willy William)
- 2010: "Make Some Noise" (with Claude N'Joya and Richard Bahericz)
- 2010: "Ciao Amore" (with Dara Bubamara)
- 2012: "Le Dernier Jour" (the last day) (with PZK)
- 2013: "Džoni Džoni" (with Dara Bubamara)
- 2017: "Segui Me" (with Master Sina and Cheb Khalass)
