= Rock This Party (Everybody Dance Now) =

2006 single by Bob Sinclar and Cutee B

- Standard artwork

Single by Bob Sinclar and Cutee B featuring Dollarman, Big Ali and Makedah

from the album Western Dream
- Released: 21 August 2006
- Length: 4:05 (album version); 3:16 (radio edit)
- Label: Yellow Productions
- Songwriters: Samuel Conrad; Naomi Goulbourne; Frédéric Poulet; Christophe Le Friant
- Producers: Bob Sinclar; Cutee B

Bob Sinclar singles chronology
"World, Hold On (Children of the Sky)" (2006)	"Rock This Party (Everybody Dance Now)" (2006)	"Tennessee" (2007)

Music video
- "Rock This Party (Everybody Dance Now)" on YouTube

Alternative cover
- French 12-inch single artwork

"Rock This Party (Everybody Dance Now)" is a song by French DJ and record producer Bob Sinclar, co-produced by regular partner Cutee B and featuring Dollarman, Big Ali, and Makedah on vocals. The song uses samples of the 1990 hit "Gonna Make You Sweat (Everybody Dance Now)" by C+C Music Factory and was released as the third major single off Sinclar's album Western Dream, on 21 August 2006. It became Sinclar's most popular single on the UK Singles Chart, peaking at number three. The song also reached number one in Belgium (Flanders and Wallonia) and number six on the Australian ARIA Singles Chart.

== Music video ==
The music video features David Beaudoin, the same boy from the "Love Generation" and "World, Hold On" videos, as well as two young girls. Throughout the video, these actors parody many famous popular songs, artist, and otherwise notable pop culture references. In order, the references are as follows: Tom Cruise during the dance scene in Risky Business, Nirvana's "Smells Like Teen Spirit" music video, AC/DC, Eminem, Bob Marley, the Red Hot Chili Peppers, Sean Paul, The Beatles' performance on The Ed Sullivan Show, Justin Timberlake's "Cry Me a River" music video, John Travolta in Saturday Night Fever, and Michael Jackson's Thriller music video. Bob Sinclar appears during the music video as a neighbor next door who comes to the house's door step to complain about the loud music being played by the boy in the house.

== Track listings and format ==
12-inch maxi-single (Yellow Productions)

1. "Rock This Party (Everybody Dance Now)" [Club Mix] 5:02
2. "Rock This Party (Everybody Dance Now)" [Dub Mix] 4:28

5-inch maxi-single (541)

1. "Rock This Party (Everybody Dance Now)" [Radio Edit] 3:16
2. "Rock This Party (Everybody Dance Now)" [Club Mix] 5:02
3. "Rock This Party (Everybody Dance Now)" [Dub Mix] 4:28

8-track CD single (Tommy Boy Entertainment, LLC)

1. "Rock This Party (Everybody Dance Now)" [Radio Edit] 3:16
2. "Rock This Party (Everybody Dance Now)" [Original Club Mix] 5:02
3. "Rock This Party (Everybody Dance Now)" [Bobby Blanco & Miki Moto Club Mix] 8:06
4. "Rock This Party (Everybody Dance Now)" [London 909 Vocal Mix] 7:52
5. "Rock This Party (Everybody Dance Now)" [Mike Cruz Rock This Club Vocal Mix] 8:20
6. "Rock This Party (Everybody Dance Now)" [Bobby Blanco & Miki Moto Dub] 6:26
7. "Rock This Party (Everybody Dance Now)" [London 909 Dub] 7:40
8. "Rock This Party (Everybody Dance Now)" [Mike Cruz Everybody Dance Dub] 7:59

== Charts ==
=== Weekly charts ===
Chart (2006–2007)	Peak position
Australia (ARIA)	6
Australian Dance (ARIA)	1
Austria (Ö3 Austria Top 40)	12
Belgium (Ultratop 50 Flanders)	1
Belgium (Ultratop 50 Wallonia)	1
CIS Airplay (TopHit)	7
Czech Republic Airplay (ČNS IFPI)	11
Denmark (Tracklisten)	19
Europe (Eurochart Hot 100)	2
Finland (Suomen virallinen lista)	3
France (SNEP)	3
Germany (GfK)	18
Hungary (Dance Top 40)	1
Hungary (Rádiós Top 40)	3
Ireland (IRMA)	4
Italy (FIMI)	11
Netherlands (Dutch Top 40)	9
Netherlands (Single Top 100)	12
New Zealand (Recorded Music NZ)	30
Norway (VG-lista)	16
Romania (Romanian Top 100)	2
Russia Airplay (TopHit)	6
Scottish Singles Sales (Official Charts)	3
Slovakia Airplay (ČNS IFPI)	22
Spain (Promusicae)	7
Sweden (Sverigetopplistan)	14
Switzerland (Schweizer Hitparade)	4
UK Singles (Official Charts)	3
UK Dance (Official Charts)	3
UK Indie (Official Charts)	1
US Dance Club Songs (Billboard)	1

=== Year-end charts ===
Chart (2006)	Position
Australia (ARIA)	47
Australian Dance (ARIA)	14
Belgium (Ultratop 50 Flanders)	10
Belgium (Ultratop 50 Wallonia)	11
CIS Airplay (TopHit)	78
Europe (Eurochart Hot 100)	8
France (SNEP)	25
Hungary (Dance Top 40)	12
Hungary (Rádiós Top 40)	78
Netherlands (Dutch Top 40)	59
Netherlands (Single Top 100)	62
Russia Airplay (TopHit)	77
Sweden (Hitlistan)	75
Switzerland (Schweizer Hitparade)	68
UK Singles (OCC)	54

Chart (2007)	Position
Australia (ARIA)	26
Australian Dance (ARIA)	6
Belgium (Ultratop 50 Wallonia)	58
CIS Airplay (TopHit)	144
Hungary (Dance Top 40)	14
Hungary (Rádiós Top 40)	75
Russia Airplay (TopHit)	135
Switzerland (Schweizer Hitparade)	87
US Dance Club Play (Billboard)	2

== Certifications ==
Region	Certification	Certified units/sales
Belgium (BRMA)	Gold	25,000^{*}
Denmark (IFPI Danmark)	Gold	4,000^{^}
New Zealand (RMNZ)	Gold	15,000^{‡}
United Kingdom (BPI)	Silver	200,000^{‡}
^{*} Sales figures based on certification alone.^{^} Shipments figures based on certification alone.^{‡} Sales+streaming figures based on certification alone.

== Release history ==
Region	Date	Format(s)	Label(s)	Ref.
Belgium	21 August 2006	Digital download EP	541; N.E.W.S.	
France	22 August 2006	Digital download	Yellow Productions	
United States	22 August 2006	Digital download	Tommy Boy	
Australia	20 September 2006	Digital download EP	Hussle	
Australia	25 September 2006	CD	Hussle	
United Kingdom	25 September 2006	Digital download	Defected	
United Kingdom	2 October 2006	CD	Defected	
