= Steve Edwards (singer) =

British singer

- Born: Stephen Neil Edwards; Sheffield, England
- Genre: House
- Occupations: Singer, songwriter
- Years active: 1993–present

Stephen Neil Edwards, better known by his stage name Steve Edwards, is an English house music singer and songwriter from Sheffield, England. He has collaborated with several house music producers.

== Biography ==
During the 1990s, Steve Edwards lent his collaborative efforts to British deep house musician Charles Webster in many songs, the most notable being "Future Love", a single released by "Presence", one of Webster's pseudonyms. He started appearing as a featured artist on tracks by the "Problem Kids".

However, his first mainstream breakthrough was Cassius' "The Sound of Violence", released in 2002, in which the artist shares credits with the French duo, went to no. 1 on Billboard Hot Dance Music/Club Play chart that year. This was followed up in 2003 by "Falling Star", a minor club hit produced by dj project "Starchaser". In 2005 Edwards' collaboration with Swedish record producer Axwell brought him fame again on a Latin-flavoured house hit song "Watch the Sunrise". The track reached no. 3 on the UK Dance Singles Chart, as well as BBC Radio 1 Dance Chart.

In 2006, the DJ returned to radioplay, after writing and providing vocals for Bob Sinclar's "World, Hold On (Children of the Sky)". Later that summer, he also participated to Festivalbar, an important music festival held in Italian cities. In September 2006, Edwards released the single "Thru the Night": this was the first time he was credited as a main artist, instead of a featured one. The song was co-written and co-produced with fellow Sheffield-based sound engineer and record producer/guitarist Martin Gregory Smith, one of his long-standing collaborators: they have remixed and produced music for Bob Sinclar and many others. Always later that year, he has also co-produced the tracks "Fate" (with Starchaser) and "Walls of Science" (for singer Beth Wild, feat. Black Spider).

In February 2015, a duo from Melbourne, L'Tric, released their debut single, "This Feeling", with Edwards singing lead vocals. The artist is currently lead singer in the Sheffield-based band Lords of Flatbush along with Andy Nicholson (former of Arctic Monkeys), Louis Carnall (former of Milburn), Phil Jones and Nicky Burke.

== Discography ==
=== Singles ===
==== As lead artist ====
- 2006 "Thru the Night" (co-written and produced by Martin Smith)
- 2006 "DYOT (Do Your Own Thing)" (with DabHands, as DabHands & Steve Edwards)

==== As featured artist ====
- 1999 Problem Kids – "I Will Lead"
- 2001 Problem Kids – "S'alright"
- 2001 Million Dollar Orchestra – "It Takes Heart"
- 2002 Reset – "An Afternoon with Steve Edwards"
- 2002 M Factor – "Mother"
- 2002 Cassius – "The Sound of Violence"
- 2002 X-Press 2 – "Call That Love"
- 2002 Guiro − "Put Your Hands Together"
- 2003 Hollway & Eastwick − "Downtime"
- 2003 Starchaser − "Falling Star"
- 2003 Robbie Rivera − "I Want More"
- 2004 D. Ramirez − "Testify"
- 2005 Electric Company − "Stone Killer"
- 2005 Axwell − "Watch the Sunrise"
- 2005 Stevie Sole − "Big Strong Love"
- 2005 Matteo Esse & Sant − "My Revolution"
- 2006 Bob Sinclar − "World, Hold On (Children of the Sky)"
- 2006 The House Keepers − "Feel da Feeling"
- 2006 Starchaser − "Fate"
- 2006 Disco Darlings and Lee Robinson − "Startrekker"
- 2007 Michael Gray − "Somewhere Beyond"
- 2008 Bob Sinclar − "Together"
- 2008 Yves Larock − "Listen to the Voice Inside"
- 2008 Bob Sinclar vs. Dario Ezequiel − "Peace Song"
- 2009 Alex Gaudino − "Take Me Down"
- 2010 The Shapeshifters − "Helter Skelter"
- 2014 Reverend and the Makers − "I Spy"

=== Appearances ===
==== Non-featured vocals ====
- 1995 On Productions − "Expanding Lion"
- 1997 Presence − "Better Day"
- 1999 Presence − "Future Love"
- 1999 Presence − "Been 2 Long" (album track)
- 1999 Presence − "Your Spirit" (album track)
- 2001 Charles Webster − "Put Your Hurt Aside" (album track)
- 2002 Fila Brazillia − "Spill the Beans" (album track)
- 2002 Fila Brazillia − "We Build Arks" (album track)
- 2002 Fila Brazillia − "Nightfall" (album track)
- 2002 Fila Brazillia − "The Green Green Grass of Homegrown" (album track)
- 2004 Bent − "Silent Life" (album track)
- 2004 Lee Haslam − "Liberate"
- 2006 Bob Sinclar − "In the Name of Love" (album track)
- 2015 L'Tric − "This Feeling"

==== Back-up vocals ====
- 1993 Supernature − "Friday People"
- 1999 The All-Seeing I − "Walk Like a Panther"
- 1999 The All-Seeing I − "No Return" (album track)
- 1999 The All-Seeing I − "Sweet Music" (album track)
- 1999 The All-Seeing I − "Stars on Sunday" (album track)
- 2003 Moloko − "Familiar Feelings"
- 2003 Moloko − "Forever More"
- 2003 Moloko − "Cannot Contain This"
- 2003 Moloko − "100%" (album track)
- 2003 Moloko − "I Want You" (album track)
- 2003 Moloko − "Over And Over" (album track)
- 2004 Bent − "Sunday 29th" (album track)
- 2004 Bent − "I Can't Believe It's Over"
- 2007 Reverend and the Makers − "Open Your Window"
- 2007 Reverend and the Makers − "Miss Brown"
- 2014 Reverend and the Makers − "I Spy"

==== As songwriter/co-producer ====
- 2004 Black Spider feat. Beth Wild − "Heart of the Sun"
- 2006 The Clubbers present Beth Wild − "Walls of Science"

== See also ==
- List of number-one dance hits (United States)
- List of artists who reached number one on the US Dance chart
