= Gary Pine =

Jamaican singer

Gary Nesta Pine
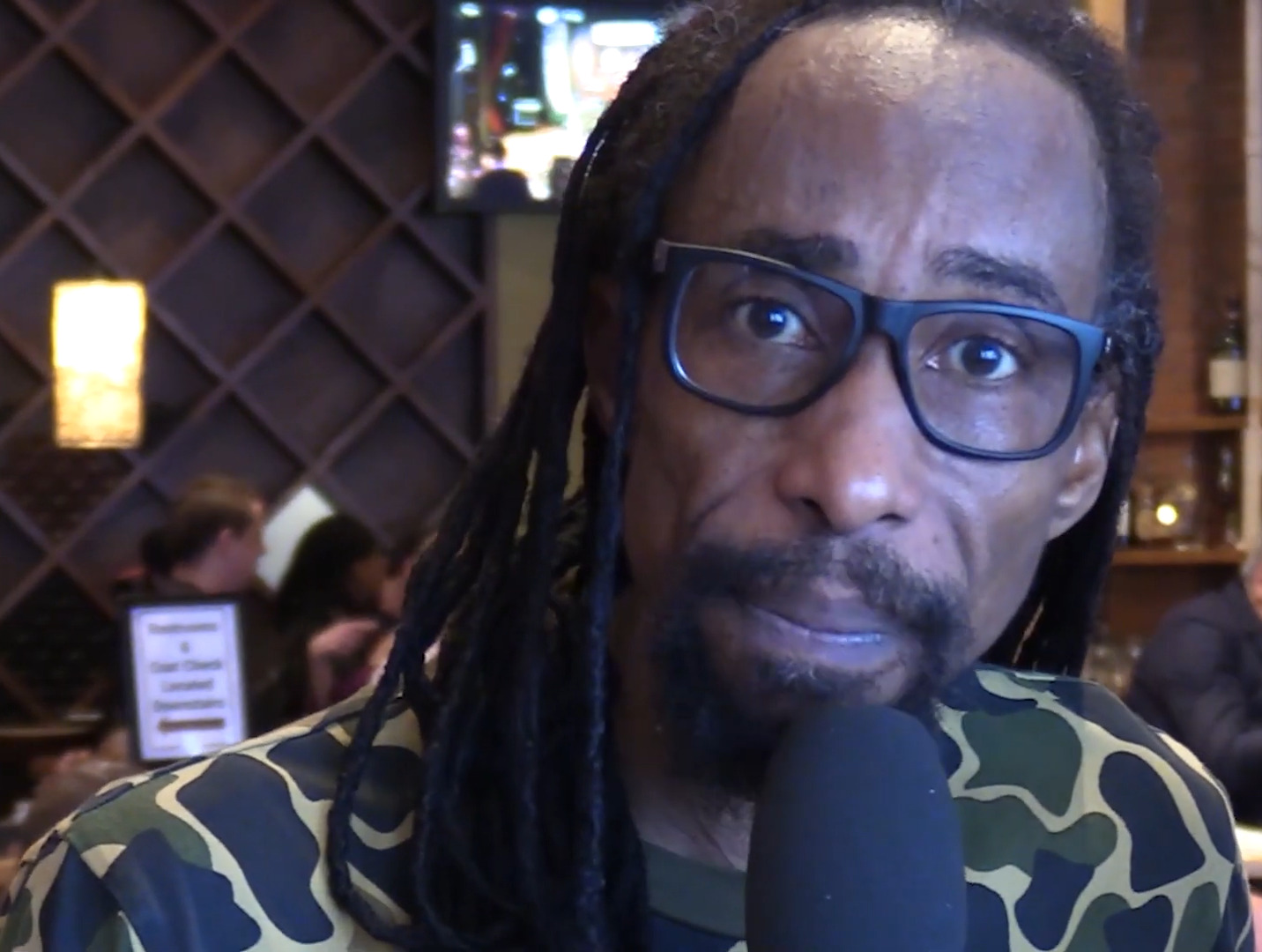
- Pine in 2025
- Born: Gary Pine
- Occupation: Singer

Gary "Nesta" Pine is a Jamaican singer best known for the vocals on several Bob Sinclar songs, including "Love Generation", "Shining from Heaven", "Miss Me", "Give a Lil' Love", and "Sound of Freedom". He was the frontman of The Wailers Band from 1998 to 2006.

== Discography ==
- 1995 - "Dem Wouldn't Live" (single)
- 2005 - "Love Generation" (single)
- 2006 - New Day Ryzin' (EP)
- 2010 - "Dirty on the Dancefloor" (feat. Hadise) - (single)
- 2012 - From Jahmaica to de World (album)
- 2016 - Revelations (album)
- 2018 - "One Love" (featuring Alessio Pras) (single)
- 2021 - "Living My Life" (with Taddy P) (single)
- 2021 - "Am an African" (single)
- 2023 - "Wolves Around Me" (single)
- 2023 - "The Way I Like It" (with Alex Phratz & Mesta) (single)
- 2023 - "Yeaao (Party, Party, Party)" (with Cèèjay & Forty-Five) (single)
