= Bob Sinclar =

French record producer (born 1969)

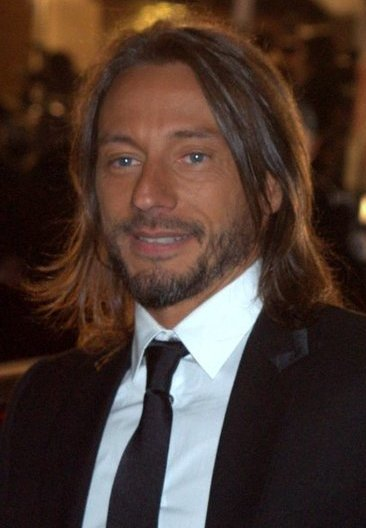
- Sinclar at the 2011 NRJ Music Awards

Background information
- Also known as: Chris the French Kiss; Desmond K; The Mighty Bop; Reminiscence Quartet
- Born: Christophe Le Friant; 10 May 1969 (age 57); Paris, France
- Genres: House; reggae fusion; ragga; electro house; French house; hip house
- Occupations: Record producer; disc jockey; remixer
- Years active: 1987–present
- Labels: Yellow; Armada; Ministry of Sound Australia
- Website: bobsinclar.com

Christophe Le Friant (French: [kʁistɔf lə fʁijɑ̃]; born 10 May 1969), better known by his stage name Bob Sinclar (French: [bɔb sɛ̃klaʁ]), is a French record producer, DJ, and remixer. He is the owner of the record label Yellow Productions.

== Musical career ==
A native of Paris, Le Friant began DJing in the 1980s under the name Chris the French Kiss. During this time he was more influenced by hip hop and jazz music and created music projects such as The Mighty Bop and Reminiscence Quartet, the latter with an ensemble of musicians and where Le Friant used the alias Desmond K.

In 1998 Le Friant adopted the name of Bob Sinclar after the titular character from the 1973 film Le Magnifique. He became known for popularising the "French touch" of house music with heavy use of sampled and filtered disco strings. He describes his musical style as inspired by "peace, love, and house music".

In the 2000s, several of Sinclar's releases became international hits, being particularly popular in Europe. Some of his most popular hits include "The Beat Goes On" (2002), "Love Generation" (2005, featuring Gary "Nesta" Pine) and "World, Hold On (Children of the Sky)" (2006, featuring Steve Edwards). In 2006, Sinclar received the TMF Award Best Dance International (Belgium), and released the song "Rock This Party (Everybody Dance Now)", which samples the 1990 C+C Music Factory's song "Gonna Make You Sweat (Everybody Dance Now)", under the label Defected Records. In 2008, Sinclar also recorded, along with Steve Edwards, "Together". In 2009, he released "Lala Song" with the hip-hop group The Sugarhill Gang, a remix of their 1979 hit "Rapper's Delight", that was the first hip-hop song to hit the top 40 charts.

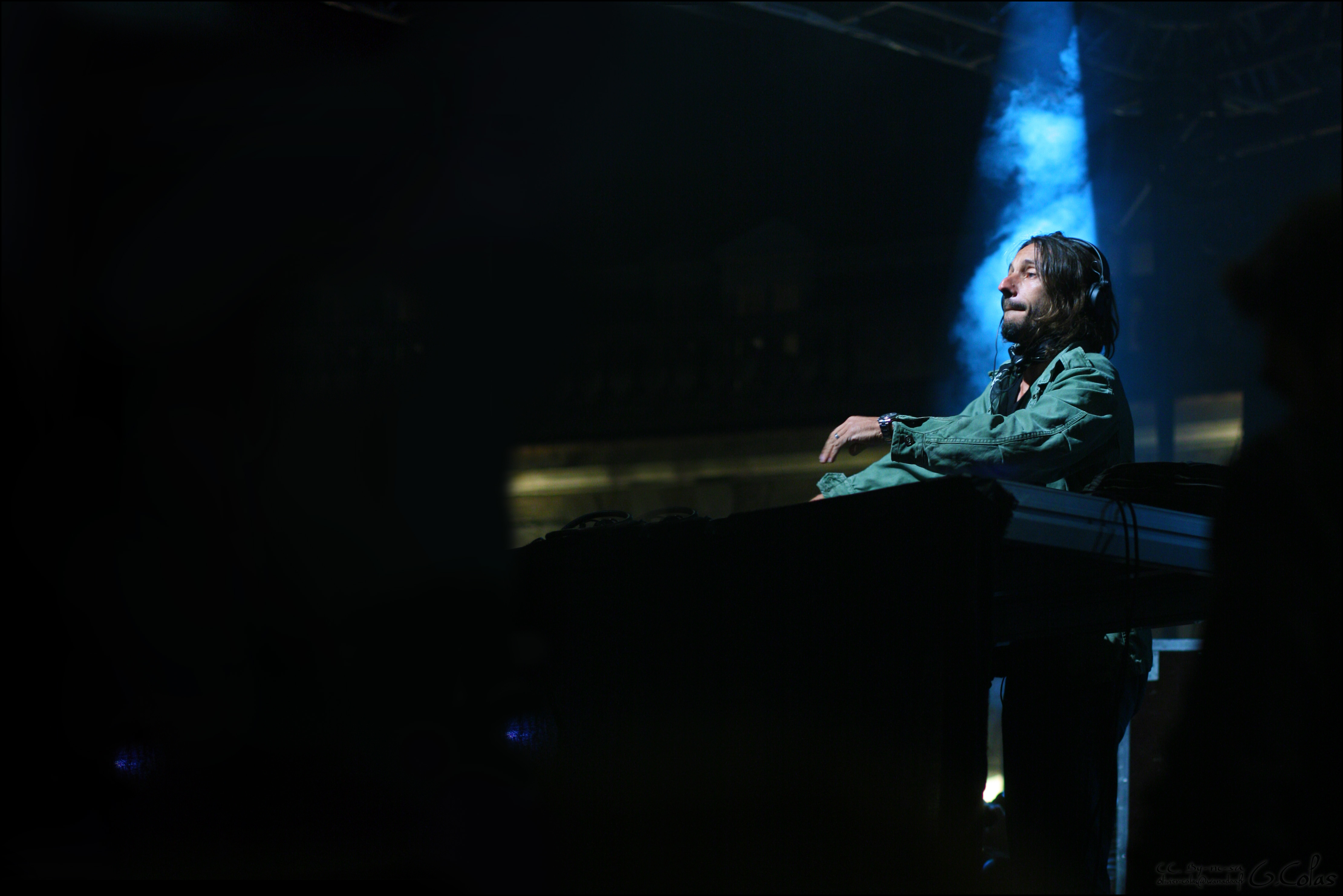
Bob Sinclar in 2009

In the 2010s, Sinclar became a very prolific music producer. In 2011, he released a song with Italian showgirl Raffaella Carrà called "Far l'amore", a remixed version of Carrà's 1976 song "A far l'amore comincia tu". In 2013, Sinclar released a single called "Summer Moonlight", while in 2015 he collaborated with Dawn Tallman for a track titled "Feel the Vibe". In 2016, he released the track "Someone Who Needs Me", under the label Spinnin' Records, with whom he also released a collaboration with Akon, titled "'Til the Sun Rise Up". In June 2018, he released a single called "I Believe", that was very popular, particularly in Italy and other parts of Europe. In May 2021, he collaborated with the vocalist Molly Hammar to produce the song "We Could Be Dancing".

Sinclar has produced dozens of official remixes over his long career, including those of songs by artists such as Jamiroquai, Moby, James Brown, Madonna, Annalisa, Robin Schulz and Rihanna.

In March 2026, he released the single "I Can't Wait," a collaboration with Canadian singer Kiesza. The track is a modern house rework of the 1986 Nu Shooz classic of the same name.

== Discography ==
Studio albums

- Paradise (1998)
- Champs Elysées (2000)
- III (2003)
- Western Dream (2006)
- Soundz of Freedom (2007)
- Born in 69 (2009)
- Disco Crash (2012)
- Paris by Night (2013)

== See also ==
- List of number-one dance hits (United States)
- List of artists who reached number one on the US Dance chart
- "Hello" (Martin Solveig and Dragonette song)
