= Yellow Productions =

Yellow Productions is a French independent record label specializing in electronic music. Based in Paris, it was founded in 1993 by DJ Yellow and Christophe Le Friant (also known as Bob Sinclar). The label's roster represents its founders' tastes in jazz, soul, bossa nova, hip hop and house music. In late 2018, Yellow Productions formed a partnership with Armada Music.

== Artists ==
- Christophe Le Friant (under the aliases Bob Sinclar, The Mighty Bop and Africanism)
- Dimitri from Paris
- Kid Loco
- Alexander Robotnick
- Silent Poets
- Michael Calfan
