= Far l'amore =

Single by Bob Sinclar and Raffaella Carrà

from the album Disco Crash
- Released: 17 March 2011
- Genre: House
- Length: 3:02
- Label: Yellow Productions
- Songwriters: Gian-Domenico Boncompagni; Franco Bracardi; Bob Sinclar; Danielle Pace
- Producer: Bob Sinclar

Bob Sinclar singles chronology
"Tik Tok" (2011)	"Far l'amore" (2011)	"Rock the Boat" (2011)

Raffaella Carrà singles chronology
"Amore (Assulaje)" (2007)	"Far l'amore" (2011)	"Replay" (2013)

Audio sample
- "Far l'amore": file; help

Music video
- "Far l'amore" on YouTube

"Far l'amore" is a song by French music producer and DJ Bob Sinclar, with vocals by Italian singer Raffaella Carrà, sampled from her 1976 hit "A far l'amore comincia tu". It was released on 17 March 2011 and peaked at number 6 in Italy.

== Music video ==
The accompanied video featured Sinclar and his date, actress and model Caterina Murino, preparing to go to his own party in Milan, Italy. They are detoured by a taxi driver who they just hailed after learning that he is not from Milan and uses a map of the city to find the directions, leading Caterina to argue with him. At the same time, everyone who just showed up for the party, including Raffaella Carrà herself, are wondering where is Sinclar and if he'll show up for his own event. After the song ends, Sinclar and Murino finally show up but everyone has since left; the two decide to spend time around Milan together.

== Track listings and formats ==
Digital download

1. "Far l'amore" (Radio Edit) – 3:02
2. "Far l'amore" (Club Mix) – 6:24

CD remixes – Energy Italy (XR 12352.11CDS)

1. "Far l'amore" (Radio Edit) – 3:02
2. "Far l'amore" (Club Mix) – 6:25
3. "Far l'amore" (Rudeejay Remix) – 5:38
4. "Far l'amore" (Nari & Milani Remix) – 6:04
5. "Far l'amore" (Michael Calfan Remix) – 5:32
6. "Far l'amore" (Stefano Pain vs. Marcel Booty Remix) – 5:54
7. "Far l'amore" (Bryan Le Grand Ibiza Mix) – 6:03
8. "Far l'amore" (Federico Scavo & NDKJ Remix) – 5:20

== Credits and personnel ==
- Bob Sinclar – producer, keyboards, arrangement, instrumentation, recording and mixing
- Raffaella Carrà – vocal, songwriter

== Charts and certifications ==
=== Weekly charts ===
Weekly chart performance for "Far l'amore"
Chart (2011–12)	Peak position
Austria (Ö3 Austria Top 40)	23
Belgium (Ultratop 50 Flanders)	15
Belgium (Ultratop 50 Wallonia)	7
CIS Airplay (TopHit)	108
Czech Republic Airplay (ČNS IFPI)	15
France (SNEP)	26
Germany (GfK)	46
Italy (FIMI)	6
Luxembourg Digital Songs (Billboard)	5
Netherlands (Dutch Top 40)	27
Netherlands (Single Top 100)	16
Russia Airplay (TopHit)	46
Slovakia Airplay (ČNS IFPI)	15
Spain (PROMUSICAE)	7
Switzerland (Schweizer Hitparade)	16
Ukraine Airplay (TopHit)	29

=== Year-end Charts ===
Annual chart rankings for "Far l'amore"
Chart (2011)	Position
Belgium (Ultratop Flanders)	78
Belgium (Ultratop Wallonia)	27
France (SNEP)	79
Italy (Musica e dischi)	35
Netherlands (Dutch Top 40)	165
Switzerland (Schweizer Hitparade)	75
Ukraine Airplay (TopHit)	94

=== Certifications ===
Certifications and sales for "Far l'amore"
Region	Certification	Certified units/sales
Italy (FIMI)	Platinum	30,000^{*}
^{*} Sales figures based on certification alone.

== See also ==
- 2011 in music
- List of top 100 singles of 2011 (France)
