= Raffa (TV series) =

2023 Italian documentary series

- Genre: Documentary
- Written by: Cristiana Farina; Barbara Boncompagni
- Directed by: Daniele Luchetti
- Starring: Raffaella Carrà; Renzo Arbore; Marco Bellocchio; Giovanni Benincasa; Barbara Boncompagni; Emanuele Crialese; Tiziano Ferro; Fiorello; Loretta Goggi; Loles León; Luca Sabatelli; Bob Sinclar
- Country of origin: Italy
- Original language: Italian
- No. of episodes: 3

Production
- Running time: 180 minutes
- Production companies: Disney+; Fremantle; Nexo Digital

Original release
- Network: Theatrical release
- Release: 6 July 2023
- Network: Disney+
- Release: 27 December 2023

Raffa is a 2023 Italian documentary television series directed by Daniele Luchetti for Disney+, based on the life of Italian singer, dancer, actress, television presenter and model Raffaella Carrà.

== Overview ==
Raffa explores the life of Raffaella Carrà in three parts, featuring numerous clips and photographs, and testimonials from friends and colleagues.

== Production ==
Carrà died of lung cancer on 5 July 2021. On 8 November 2022, Disney+ announced the development of Raffa, a documentary series that would pay tribute to Carrà. Produced by Fremantle, the series was directed by Daniele Luchetti, and written by Cristiana Farina, with the participation of Carlo Altinier, Barbara Boncompagni, Salvatore Coppolino and Salvo Guercio. Filming began in November 2022.

Part one covers Carrà's youth in Emilia-Romagna, Italy, as Raffaella Pelloni, the daughter of an absent father and a strong mother; her starring role in the 1965 American film Von Ryan's Express opposite Frank Sinatra; her 1970 guest appearance on the short-lived Italian variety show Io, Agata e tu which led to her success as presenter, actress and dancer on the Saturday night show Canzonissima from 1970 to 1971; and the scandal of Carrà being the first woman on Italian television to show her navel on television during the November 1971 performance of her new single "Tuca tuca" on Canzonissima. Part two follows Carrà's music career and the international notoriety brought by her songs "Rumore" (1974) and "A far l'amore comincia tu" (1976); her success in Spain and South America in the late 1970s; the controversy created by RAI in 1978 when they broadcast Carrà's new Saturday night variety show, Ma che sera, in the early days of the kidnapping of former prime minister Aldo Moro, despite Carrà's protests; and her success as the host of the daytime talk show Pronto, Raffaella? (1983–1985), the first midday program ever broadcast on Rai 1. Part three sees Carrà move to Canale 5 in the late 1980s with the Raffaella Carrà Show and Il principe azzurro, and serve as host on Carràmba! Che sorpresa on Rai 1 from 1995 to 2002.

The documentary collects over 1500 clips of archival footage, most of them from RAI, and numerous testimonies from Carrà's collaborators and friends, including Renzo Arbore, Marco Bellocchio, Giovanni Benincasa, Barbara Boncompagni, Emanuele Crialese, Tiziano Ferro, Fiorello, Loretta Goggi, Sergio Japino, Loles León, Caterina Rita, Luca Sabatelli, Bob Sinclar and Enzo Paolo Turchi.

== Release ==
Raffa was released in Italian cinemas by Nexo Digital as a preview from 6 to 12 July 2023. Lucchetti said, "I would like people to see this documentary in the theater, because we are used to thinking of Raffaella as an icon of the small screen, a TV diva. Seeing her spread across forty square meters of screen in the theater makes a different impression."

On 27 December 2023, Raffa debuted as a three-part docuseries on the Disney+ video streaming platform.

== Reception ==
Mattia Carzagina of Rolling Stone Italia called Raffa, "a very rich film, full of beautiful things, but which deliberately does not solve the enigma of the icon of Italian TV ... Carrà herself did not reveal herself, until the end, not even to her closest loved ones". Elisa Giudici of Rockol wrote, "Raffa is the story of a figure that has gradually become a pagan idol, scandalous and desired, capable of sending coded messages to queer people in Italy and at the same time consoling and keeping housewives company while they prepare lunch."

Paolo Scotti of Il Giornale described Raffa as "a pharaonic full immersion in the Carrà myth", developed around the dichotomy between Carrà's professional persona and her personal life. Davide Turrini of Il Fatto Quotidiano praised Luchetti's "cinematic, fabulous and winning intention" to compare and contrast Carrà's career and life in a way that "captivates and convinces with its vaguely original design".

Lorenzo Ciofani of Cinematografo wrote that the series narrated Carrà's life in a "layered and never hagiographic" way, and "without eluding the traumas and mysteries". He noted that "Raffa courageously embraces a novelistic ambition" coherently describing "a pragmatic and disciplined self-made woman who is also a romantic and melancholic anti-heroine", also showing the audience her negative characteristics, as "they are left in full light by Carrà herself, a wise and martial self-administrator". Paola Jacobbi of Harper's Bazaar wrote, "Luchetti and his authors open a glimmer of light on a deeply neurotic Raffa, [...] who hid her fragilities behind and inside her work, her perfectionism, the glitter of the limelight".
