= Applauso =

- The international cover of the album, titled "Aplauso"

Studio album by Raffaella Carrà
- Released: April 1979
- Recorded: January 1979
- Venues: Rome, Italy
- Studio: Studio Bus
- Genres: Pop; italo disco
- Languages: Italian; English; Spanish
- Label: CBS Italiana
- Producer: Gianni Boncompagni

Raffaella Carrà chronology
Raffaella (1978)	Applauso (1979)	Mi spendo tutto (1980)

Singles from Raffaella
- 1. "E salutala per me" / "Ciak" Released: 1979; 2. "Torna da me" / "Joggin'" Released: 1979; 3. "Santo, Santo" / "Drin drin" Released: 1979; 4. "Torna da me" / "Drin drin" Released: 1979

Applauso (in some countries released as Aplauso and Canta En Español) is a tenth studio album by Italian singer Raffaella Carrà, released in 1979 by CBS Italiana, her second to be also distributed in the United States.

The album reached 75th on the 33 best-selling albums in 1979 in Italy, peaking at 24th during the weekly charts.

In 1990 it was reissued in all formats and for the first time on CD, without any remastering (CBS 466413).

The album contains one of her most successful ballads, "E salutala per me", that describes the story of a woman aware of her man's betrayal, urging him to go to him mistress and to stop telling lies. In 1980 the Belgian singer Maria Miel recorded a French version of the song entitled "Va".

In addition to the single released for the Italian market, also distributed on the Hispanic and international market, more singles have been printed abroad: "Torna da me/Joggin'", CBS 7736 in Germany, and CBS 7844 in the Netherlands (with sides reversed), "Santo, Santo/Drin drin" (Epic 340,001 in Spain) contains two songs in Spanish: the main side is Manolo Díaz translation of the song "Ma che vacanza è"; the text of side b, which maintains the original title, is instead by Luis Gómez-Escolar and "Torna da me/Drin drin" (Melodia 62-08375-6 in Russia), with both songs in Italian.

== Overview ==
The album was distributed in Chile, Colombia, Venezuela, Peru, Uruguay, Argentina and Bolivia with the title Aplauso, with the tracks translated into Spanish in the same sequence and with the artwork of the edition in Italian. The same in Spain, but with the title Canta En Español and the song "E salutela per me" with the title translated into "No le hagas lo que a mí", while in all the other editions it is "Corre y ve donde está ella". In Turkey, Greece, Germany, Canada, Japan, Yugoslavia and the Netherlands the album has been distributed with the tracks in Italian and in the latter country also in a rare picture disc version. The editions for the states of the Soviet Union in 1980 included four different versions: white, pink, red and laminated labels, all with the title Поет Рафаэлла Карра (Raffaella Carrà) and reprinted several times until 1989

At the 8th Annual Tokyo Music Festival, held on June 17, 1979, at the Nippon Budokan Hall, Raffaella Carrà represented Italy performing the song "Drin, Drin", and received a Silver Award for the song "Luca", included in the album Raffaella.

== Track listing ==
Applauso Side A
No.	Title	Writer(s)	Length
1.	"Ciak"	Corrado Castellari; Cristiano Malgioglio	3:03
2.	"Torna da me"	Franco Bracardi; Gianni Belfiore; Gianni Boncompagni	2:55
3.	"Povero amore"	Bracardi; Boncompagni	2:55
4.	"A parole"	Bracardi; Belfiore; Boncompagni	3:38
5.	"Riproviamoci"	Adelmo Musso; Antonello De Sanctis	3:38

Side B
No.	Title	Writer(s)	Length
1.	"Drin Drin"	Bracardi; Belfiore; Boncompagni	3:33
2.	"E salutala per me"	Bracardi; Boncompagni	4:35
3.	"Ma che vacanza è"	Bracardi; Belfiore; Boncompagni	2:55
4.	"Soli soli"	Bracardi; Belfiore; Boncompagni	3:06
5.	"Joggin'"	Musso; Bracardi; Boncompagni; Manolo Diaz	3:05

Aplauso Side A
No.	Title	Writer(s)	Length
1.	"Chak"	Corrado Castellari; Cristiano Malgioglio; Luis Gómez-Escolar	3:03
2.	"Vuelve"	Franco Bracardi; Gianni Belfiore; Gianni Boncompagni; Luis Gómez-Escolar	2:55
3.	"Amor ingrato"	Bracardi; Boncompagni; Luis Gómez-Escolar	2:55
4.	"De Palabra"	Bracardi; Belfiore; Boncompagni; Luis Gómez-Escolar	3:38
5.	"Perdonémonos"	Adelmo Musso; Antonello De SanctisLuis Gómez-Escolar	3:38

Side B
No.	Title	Writer(s)	Length
1.	"Drin Drin"	Bracardi; Belfiore; Boncompagni; Luis Gómez-Escolar	3:33
2.	"Corre y ve donde está ella"	Bracardi; Boncompagni; Manolo Diaz	4:35
3.	"Santo, Santo"	Bracardi; Belfiore; Boncompagni; Manolo Diaz	2:55
4.	"Cara A Cara"	Bracardi; Belfiore; Boncompagni; Luis Gómez-Escolar	3:06
5.	"Jogging"	Musso; Bracardi; Boncompagni; Manolo Diaz	3:05

Canta En Español Side A
No.	Title	Writer(s)	Length
1.	"Chak"	Corrado Castellari; Cristiano Malgioglio; Luis Gómez-Escolar	3:03
2.	"Vuelve"	Franco Bracardi; Gianni Belfiore; Gianni Boncompagni; Luis Gómez-Escolar	2:55
3.	"Amor ingrato"	Bracardi; Boncompagni; Luis Gómez-Escolar	2:55
4.	"De Palabra"	Bracardi; Belfiore; Boncompagni; Luis Gómez-Escolar	3:38
5.	"Perdonémonos"	Adelmo Musso; Antonello De SanctisLuis Gómez-Escolar	3:38

Side B
No.	Title	Writer(s)	Length
1.	"Drin Drin"	Bracardi; Belfiore; Boncompagni; Luis Gómez-Escolar	3:33
2.	"No le hagas lo que a mí"	Bracardi; Boncompagni; Manolo Diaz	4:35
3.	"Santo, Santo"	Bracardi; Belfiore; Boncompagni; Manolo Diaz	2:55
4.	"Cara A Cara"	Bracardi; Belfiore; Boncompagni; Luis Gómez-Escolar	3:06
5.	"Jogging"	Musso; Bracardi; Boncompagni; Manolo Diaz	3:05

== Credits ==
- Raffaella Carrà – vocals
- Danilo Vaona – arrangement
- Antonio Marzullo – engineering
- Giuseppe Ranieri – assistant engineering
- Gaetano Vituzzi – engineering, mixing
- Gianni Boncompagni – production
- Luciano Tallarini – design
- Gianni Ronco – Illustration
