= Pedro (song) =

1980 single by Raffaella Carrà

Single by Raffaella Carrà

from the album Mi spendo tutto
- B-side: "Io non vivo senza te" (Italy) "Maria Marì" (Europe)
- Released: 1980
- Genre: Pop; Italo disco
- Length: 3:20
- Label: CBS
- Songwriters: Franco Bracardi; Gianni Boncompagni; Paolo Ormi
- Producer: Gianni Boncompagni

"Pedro" is a song by Italian singer Raffaella Carrà, from her album Mi spendo tutto. In 2024, the song was remixed by German producers Jaxomy and Agatino Romero, leading to a resurgence in popularity.

== Track listings ==
7" single (Italy)

1. "Pedro" – 3:20
2. "Io non vivo senza te" (I Can't Live Without You) – 3:27

7" single (Europe)

1. "Pedro" – 3:20
2. "Maria Marì" (Mary Mary) – 3:27

== Certifications ==
Certifications for "Pedro"
Region	Certification	Certified units/sales
Italy (FIMI)	Platinum	100,000^{‡}
^{‡} Sales+streaming figures based on certification alone.

== Jaxomy and Agatino Romero version ==
"Pedro"

Single by Jaxomy, Agatino Romero, and Raffaella Carrà
- Language: Italian
- Released: 29 March 2024
- Genre: Techno; EDM
- Length: 2:24
- Label: B1; Ultra
- Producers: Jaxomy; Agatino Romero; Steffen Harning; Reinhart Raith

Music video
- "Pedro" on YouTube

Almost three years after Raffaella Carrà's death, and 44 years after the release of the original song, in 2024, German producers Jaxomy and Agatino Romero remixed the song. It was released digitally on 20 February 2024. It went viral on YouTube and TikTok in April when a video of a raccoon kit above a rotating camera was posted.

=== Charts ===
==== Weekly charts ====
Weekly chart performance for "Pedro"
Chart (2024)	Peak position
Austria (Ö3 Austria Top 40)	4
Belgium (Ultratop 50 Flanders)	7
Belgium (Ultratop 50 Wallonia)	30
Bulgaria Airplay (PROPHON)	5
CIS Airplay (TopHit)	61
Croatia (Billboard)	16
Croatia International Airplay (Top lista)	2
Czech Republic Airplay (ČNS IFPI)	25
Czech Republic Singles Digital (ČNS IFPI)	2
Denmark (Tracklisten)	12
Estonia Airplay (TopHit)	1
Finland (Suomen virallinen lista)	3
France (SNEP)	34
Germany (GfK)	3
Global 200 (Billboard)	37
Greece International (IFPI)	26
Hungary (Dance Top 40)	2
Hungary (Single Top 40)	5
Iceland (Tónlistinn)	17
Ireland (IRMA)	48
Italy (FIMI)	44
Latvia (LAIPA)	5
Lithuania (AGATA)	3
Lithuania Airplay (TopHit)	1
Netherlands (Dutch Top 40)	7
Netherlands (Single Top 100)	8
New Zealand Hot Singles (RMNZ)	19
Norway (VG-lista)	18
Poland (Polish Airplay Top 100)	23
Poland (Polish Streaming Top 100)	9
Portugal (AFP)	26
Slovakia Airplay (ČNS IFPI)	16
Slovakia Singles Digital (ČNS IFPI)	1
Spain (Promusicae)	18
Sweden (Sverigetopplistan)	15
Switzerland (Schweizer Hitparade)	7
Ukraine Airplay (TopHit)	26
UK Singles (Official Charts)	57
UK Dance (Official Charts)	16
US Hot Dance/Electronic Songs (Billboard)	12
US World Digital Song Sales (Billboard)	8

==== Monthly charts ====
Monthly chart performance for "Pedro"
Chart (2024)	Position
CIS Airplay (TopHit)	65
Czech Republic (Singles Digitál – Top 100)	2
Estonia Airplay (TopHit)	3
Lithuania Airplay (TopHit)	1
Ukraine Airplay (TopHit)	49

=== Year-end charts ===
2024 year-end chart performance for "Pedro"
Chart (2024)	Position
Austria (Ö3 Austria Top 40)	14
Belgium (Ultratop 50 Flanders)	34
Estonia Airplay (TopHit)	16
Germany (GfK)	23
Hungary (Dance Top 40)	11
Hungary (Single Top 40)	53
Netherlands (Dutch Top 40)	49
Netherlands (Single Top 100)	40
Poland (Polish Streaming Top 100)	38
Sweden (Sverigetopplistan)	76
Switzerland (Schweizer Hitparade)	44

2025 year-end chart performance for "Pedro"
Chart (2025)	Position
Hungary (Dance Top 40)	14

=== Certifications ===
Certifications for "Pedro"
Region	Certification	Certified units/sales
Belgium (BRMA)	Platinum	40,000^{‡}
Canada (Music Canada)	Gold	40,000^{‡}
Denmark (IFPI Danmark)	Gold	45,000^{‡}
Germany (BVMI)	Gold	300,000^{‡}
Hungary (MAHASZ)	5× Platinum	20,000^{‡}
Italy (FIMI)	Gold	50,000^{‡}
Norway (IFPI Norway)	Platinum	60,000^{‡}
Poland (ZPAV)	4× Platinum	200,000^{‡}
Portugal (AFP)	Gold	5,000^{‡}
Spain (Promusicae)	Platinum	60,000^{‡}
Switzerland (IFPI Switzerland)	Gold	15,000^{‡}
United Kingdom (BPI)	Silver	200,000^{‡}
^{‡} Sales+streaming figures based on certification alone.
