= Forte forte forte =

Studio album by Raffaella Carrà
- Released: 1976
- Genre: Pop; Eurodisco
- Label: CGD 81439
- Producer: Danilo Vaona (tracks 4, 6 and 8), Paolo Ormi (all others)

Raffaella Carrà chronology
Felicità tà tà (1974)	Forte forte forte (1976)	Fiesta (1977)

Singles from Joe Dassin (Si tu t'appelles Mélancolie)
- 1. "Male / Sciocco" Released: 1975; 2. "Tornerai / 53 53 456" Released: 1975; 3. "Forte forte forte / A far l'amore comincia tu" Released: 1976

Forte forte forte is a seventh studio album by Italian singer Raffaella Carrà. It was released in 1976 under the label CGD.

== Commercial performance ==
U.S. Billboard magazine reported in its 24 December 1977 issue that according to CBS Forte forte forte was among the company's top selling albums over the past month. The single 53.53.456 was certified gold in Canada.

== Track listing ==
No.	Title	Lyrics	Music	Length
1.	"Male"	Gianni Boncompagni, Shel Shapiro	Andrea Lo Vecchio	3:41
2.	"Tornerai"	Olivieri	Restrelli	4:15
3.	"53 53 456"	Gianni Boncompagni		3:20
4.	"A far l'amore comincia tu"	Daniele Pace	Franco Bracardi	2:42
5.	"Voglia di tornare"	De Luca		4:05

No.	Title	Lyrics	Music	Length
1.	"Forte forte forte"	Cristiano Malgioglio	Franco Bracardi	3:22
2.	"Sciocco"	Gianni Boncompagni		2:57
3.	"Bobo Step"	Gianni Boncompagni	Morgan	3:28
4.	"E mia madre"	Carla Vistarini	Tony Cicco	4:56

== Charts ==
Weekly charts for Forte forte forte
Chart (1979)	Peak position
Argentine Albums (Prensarlo)	2
