= Raffaella (1978 album) =

Studio album by Raffaella Carrà
- Released: February 1978
- Recorded: 21 February 1978
- Venue: Rome, Italy
- Studio: Studio Bus
- Genre: Pop; Eurodisco
- Length: 35:25
- Language: Italian; English; Spanish
- Label: CBS Italiana
- Producer: Gianni Boncompagni

Raffaella Carrà chronology
Fiesta (1977)	Raffaella (1978)	Applauso (1979)

Singles from Raffaella
- 1. "Black cat" / "California" Released: 1977; 2. "Tanti auguri" / "Amoa" Released: 1978

Raffaella (in some countries released as Hay que venir al sur) is the ninth studio album by Italian singer Raffaella Carrà, released in 1978 by CBS Italiana. It marked her first release to be distributed in the United States, further consolidating her growing international presence.

The album appeared in several markets with variations in title, language, and track order. In Spain and Latin America it was issued in Spanish under the title Hay que venir al sur, while in other countries it retained its original Italian version and artwork. Promotional campaigns accompanied the release, with CBS Records Brazil launching a strong effort in mid-1978.

Commercially, the album was supported by Carrà's active promotion across different countries. Her visit to Argentina boosted sales significantly, and she represented Italy at the 8th Annual Tokyo Music Festival in 1979 with the track "Luca", earning a Silver Award. The LP also achieved certification in Greece.

== Album details ==
The album was distributed in Spain, Colombia, Venezuela, Uruguay and the United States under the title Hay que venir al sur, and retains the artwork and track layout of the Italian version but with the songs translated into Spanish (except "Sono Nera" and "Amoa") with "Tango" replaced by its translation "Lola". In the Mexican version the tracks are ordered differently. In the rest of the world the disc was distributed with the title Raffaella keeping the songs in Italian, artwork and identical arrangement of the tracks.

== Release and promotion ==
According to Cash Box (June 17, 1978), CBS Records Brazil was scheduled to release in July the LP Raffaella, accompanied by a strong promotional campaign. In July, the magazine reported that the single "California" bubbling under the tenth place on the best-sellers lists of the country. In November, Carrà's visit in Argentina helped CBS significantly boost its sales; two singles and two LPs appeared among the top chart items, and other recordings by the singer were also selling briskly. Industry estimates indicated that nearly 100,000 LPs of Carrà’s catalog had been sold as a result of her visit, more than £50,000 worth.

At the 8th Annual Tokyo Music Festival, held on June 17, 1979, at the Nippon Budokan Hall, Raffaella Carrà represented Italy and received a Silver Award for the song "Luca", included in the album Raffaella.

== Critical reception ==
Professional ratings
Review scores
Source	Rating
AllMusic	3/5 stars
Music Week	2/3 stars

Music Week review pointing out that Raffaella Carrà had recently enjoyed chart success with the single "Do It, Do It Again," which naturally appeared on the LP. The magazine noted that Epic moved quickly to capitalize on this momentum by releasing the album, which features additional songs such as "Rumore," "Black Cat," and "A Million Dollars." According to the review, these tracks were described as equally catchy and well-suited for the season, making the record a strong candidate for consistent summertime sales. The critic emphasized that the album’s upbeat, danceable style aligned perfectly with the festive and holiday atmosphere, reinforcing Carrà's appeal as an international pop entertainer.

== Commercial performance ==
The album was certified gold in Greece.

== Track listing ==
Raffaella Side A
No.	Title	Writer(s)	Length
1.	"Black Cat"	Gianni Boncompagni; Paolo Ormi; Franco Bracardi; Ann Reid Collin	3:54
2.	"Sono nera"	Boncompagni; Ormi	3:45
3.	"Dancin' In The Sun"	Boncompagni; Ormi; Collin	3:40
4.	"Tango"	Boncompagni; Ormi	3:00
5.	"Amoa"	Boncompagni; Ormi	3:25

Side B
No.	Title	Writer(s)	Length
1.	"Tanti auguri"	Boncompagni; Ormi; Daniele Pace	3:50
2.	"Luca"	Boncompagni; Ormi	3:53
3.	"California"	Boncompagni; Ormi; Bracardi; Collin	3:58
4.	"Ci vediamo domani"	Boncompagni; Ormi	3:10
5.	"A Million Dollars"	Boncompagni; Ormi; Collin	2:50

Hay que venir al sur Side A
No.	Title	Writer(s)	Length
1.	"Black Cat"	Boncompagni; Ormi; Bracardi; Collin	3:50
2.	"Soy negra"	Boncompagni; Ormi	3:43
3.	"Ballando en el sol"	Boncompagni; Ormi; Collin	3:38
4.	"Lola"	Boncompagni; Ormi; Luis Gómez-Escolar	3:00
5.	"Amoa"	Boncompagni; Ormi	3:25

Side B
No.	Title	Writer(s)	Length
1.	"Hay que venir al sur"	Boncompagni; Ormi; Manolo Diaz	3:46
2.	"Lucas"	Boncompagni; Ormi; Escolar	3:52
3.	"California"	Boncompagni; Ormi; Bracardi; Collin; Escolar	3:58
4.	"¿Nos veremos mañana?"	Boncompagni; Ormi; Escolar	3:10
5.	"Un Millón de Dolares"	Boncompagni; Ormi; Collin	2:50

== Credits ==
- Raffaella Carrà – vocals
- Paolo Ormi – arrangement
- Antonio Marzullo – engineering
- Giuseppe Ranieri – assistant engineering
- Gaetano Vituzzi – engineering, mixing
- Gianni Boncompagni – production
- Bruno Vergottini – design
- Chiara Samugheo – photography

== Charts ==
Chart (1978)	Peak position
Argentine Albums (Prensarlo)	5
Greek Albums (Pop And Rock)	5
Italian Albums (Musica e dischi)	11
Spanish Albums (AFE)	27

== Certifications and sales ==
Region	Certification	Certified units/sales
Greece (IFPI Greece)	Gold	50,000^{^}
Italy	—	300,000
^{^} Shipments figures based on certification alone.
