= Fiesta (Raffaella Carrà album) =

Studio album by Raffaella Carrà
- Released: September 1977
- Genre: Latin pop; Eurodisco
- Length: 38:29
- Language: Italian; Spanish; English
- Label: CGD
- Producer: Gianni Boncompagni

Raffaella Carrà chronology
| Forte forte forte (1976) | Fiesta (1977) | Raffaella (1978) |

Singles from Fiesta
- 1. "Fiesta" Released: 1977

Fiesta is the eighth studio album by Italian singer Raffaella Carrà, released in 1977 by CGD. The album was named after the song of the same name, which was widely popular in Italy, Spain, Canada and Argentina. The recording was produced by Gianni Boncompagni.

The Italian and Canadian versions of the album have songs in both English and Italian, while the Spanish version has lyrics adapted to the language. In 1977, Raffaella Carra was nominated for the Canadian Disco Awards for this album.

As part of the Fiesta promotion, Carrà went on tour, visiting Argentina, Chile, Peru and Mexico in 1979.

== Track listing ==
Side A
| No. | Title | Lyrics | Music | Length |
|---|---|---|---|---|
| 1. | "Fiesta" | Gianni Boncompagni; Luis Gómez-Escolar | Franco Bracardi; Paolo Ormi | 3:23 |
| 2. | "Dreamin' of You" | Boncompagni; Ormi | Boncompagni; Ormi | 4:30 |
| 3. | "Non dobbiamo litigare più" | Boncompagni | Ormi; Bracardi | 3:22 |
| 4. | "Vola" | Boncompagni | T. Benn Feghali | 4:31 |
| 5. | "I Thank You Life" | Boncompagni | Bracardi | 3:54 |

Side B
| No. | Title | Lyrics | Music | Length |
|---|---|---|---|---|
| 1. | "Mi sento bella" | Boncompagni | Ormi | 3:41 |
| 2. | "How You Doin'" | Boncompagni; Susan Duncan Smith | Boncompagni; Ormi | 3:41 |
| 3. | "Il presidente" | Boncompagni | Bracardi | 3:42 |
| 4. | "Ma ne sai più di me" | Boncompagni | Bracardi | 3:40 |
| 5. | "Melodia" | Andrea Lo Vecchio | Shel Shapiro | 4:05 |

== Credits ==
- Raffaella Carrà – vocals
- Shel Shapiro – arrangement
- Paolo Ormi – guitar, piano, percussion, arrangement
- Enzo Restuccia – drums, percussion
- Massimo Bartoletti, Alberto Corvino, Nino Culasso, Ernesto Pumpo – trombone
- Silvestro Catacchio, Giuseppe Gabucci, Camillo Grasso, Milena Costisella, Paolo Mezzaroma, Fernando Baratta – strings
- Rita Mariano, Patrizia Neri, Isabella Sodani – backing vocals

== Charts ==
| Chart (1977) | Peak position |
|---|---|
| Spanish Albums (AFE) | 4 |
