= Tuca tuca =

Single by Raffaella Carrà
- B-side: "Vi dirò la verità"
- Released: 13 November 1971
- Genre: Dance pop
- Length: 6:03
- Label: RCA Italiana
- Producer: Gianni Boncompagni

"Tuca tuca" is the fifth single by Italian pop singer Raffaella Carrà, published in 1971 by the Italian record company RCA Italiana. Both the single and its B-side song "Vi dirò la verità" were included on the album Raffaella Carrà, produced the same year by BMG Ricordi.

In Italy the single achieved the fourth position on the sales chart, thanks in part to the popularity of dance the created for it.

== Background ==
On 13 November 1971, while hosting the Italian variety show Canzonissima, Carrà performed her new single "Tuca tuca" wearing a top which showed her navel. She was the first woman to show it on Italian public television, at a time in which it was unusual for women to show their bodies, which caused controversy for the conservative TV network RAI and was called "too provocative" by the Vatican newspaper L'Osservatore Romano.

In the same episode, Carrà and dancer Enzo Paolo Turchi performed choreography for the song, created by Don Lurio at the suggestion from producer Gianni Boncompagni that he create a playful dance. The dance was an immediate success, both for the simplicity of the moves and also for their shocking nature, being very daring for the times and presenting the image of a girl being less subservient to a seductive man. RAI executives feared that the fixed shots of the second camera could induce viewers to believe that the male dancer was touching other "forbidden" parts of Carrà's body rather than her hips, and after first attempting to change the staging, censored the dance altogether. Carrà's performance of the dance with Alberto Sordi in the 27 November 1971 episode, again leaving her navel uncovered, managed to overcome the censorship of the management, and the dance became a popular phenomenon. Subsequently, any male guest who appeared on the program was obligated to perform the dance with Carrà.

== Track listings ==
7" single "Tuca tuca" (Italy, 1972, RCA Italiana)

1. "Tuca tuca" – 2:39 (lyrics: Gianni Boncompagni – music: Franco Pisano)
2. "Vi dirò la verità" – 3:24 (lyrics: Gianni Boncompagni – music: Franco Pisano)

7" single "Tuca tuca, sì" (Italy, 1972)

1. "Tuca tuca" – 2:39 (both as a single and in the album Raffaella... Senzarespiro)

7" single "Tuca tuca" (Spain, 1976)

1. "Tuca tuca" – 2:39 (as part of the album for the spanish market Male/Felicità tà tà)

7" single "Tuca tuca, sì" (Italy, 1999)

1. "Tuca tuca" – 2:39 (from the remix compilation Fiesta – I grandi successi)

7" single "Tuca tuca, sì" (Italy, 2008)

1. "Tuca tuca" – 2:39 (from the compilation of radio versions Raffica – Balletti & Duetti)

7" single "I Like It" (UK, 2008)

1. "Tuca tuca" – 2:39 (from the compilation of singles in english language Raffica – Balletti & Duetti)

== Charts ==
"Tuca tuca"
Chart (1972)	Peak position
Italy (Musica e dischi)	4
