= A far l'amore comincia tu =

Single by Raffaella Carrà

from the album Forte forte forte
- A-side: "Forte forte forte"
- Released: 1976
- Recorded: 1975
- Genre: Disco; funk; Latin pop
- Label: CGD (Italy); Columbia
- Songwriter(s): Daniele Pace; Franco Bracardi
- Producer(s): Gianni Boncompagni

Raffaella Carrà singles chronology
"5353456" (1975)	"A far l'amore comincia tu" (1976)	"Fiesta" (1977)

Music videos
- "A far l'amore comincia tu" (1977, TopPop, alternate version) "A far l'amore comincia tu" (1977, TopPop) on YouTube

"A far l'amore comincia tu" (Italian pronunciation: [a fˈfar laˈmoːre koˈmintʃa ˈtu]; "You start making love first") is a song by Italian singer Raffaella Carrà from her album Forte forte forte (1976). It was written by Franco Bracardi and Daniele Pace, and produced by Gianni Boncompagni.

== Other versions and covers ==
- "A far l'amore comincia tu" was recorded by Carrà in Spanish as "En el amor todo es empezar", in German as "Liebelei", in French as "Puisque tu l'aimes dis-le lui", and in English as "Do It, Do It Again". The latter was Carrà's only entry on the UK Singles Chart, reaching number 9, until the remix of "Pedro" charted 46 years later.
- In 1977, German singer Tony Holiday covered the song, retitled "Tanze Samba mit mir". The song quickly became a hit in both Germany and Austria, peaking at no. 4 on the German music charts and reaching the Top 20 on the Austrian music charts.
- In 1977, French Canadian singer Châtelaine covered the song, retitled "Corps à Corps (Avec Toi)." In the midst of the disco era, this song quickly climbed the Quebec charts to reach number one. It remained there for 3 consecutive weeks.

== Track listings ==
7" single "Forte forte forte" (Italy, 1976)

A. "Forte forte forte"

(Malgioglio – Bracardi)

B. "A far l'amore comincia tu"

(Daniele Pace – Bracardi)

CGD 4236
CBS Sugar S.p.A.

7" single (Canada, 1976)

A. "A far l'amore comincia tu (2:42)
B. "Forte forte forte (3:32)
Columbia C4 8148
Manufactured by CBS Disques Canada Ltée

7" single "Raffaella Carrà canta en español "Fuerte fuerte fuerte" (Spain, 1976)

A. "Fuerte fuerte fuerte" ("Forte forte forte") (2:40) [in Spanish]
B. "En el amor todo es empezar" ("A far l'amore comincia tu") (3:40) [in Spanish]
CBS 4670
Discos CBS, S.A., Madrid

7" single "Liebelei" (Germany, 1977)

A. "Liebelei" (2:40)
B. "Forte forte forte" (3:40) [in German]
CBS S 5543

7" single "Do It, Do It Again" (Germany, 1978)

A. "Do It, Do It Again" (2:40) (englische Originalaufnahme von "Liebelei (A far l'amore comincia tu)" [in English]
B. "A far l'amore comincia tu" (2:40)
CBS 6094, CBS S 6094
CBS Schallplatten GmbH

7" single "Puisque tu l'aimes dis-le lui / A far l'amore comincia tu" (France, 1978)

A. "Puisque tu l'aimes dis-le lui" (2:40) (Vers. "A far l'amore comincia tu") [in French]
B. "A far l'amore comincia tu" (2:40)
CBS 4771
CBS Inc.

7" single "A far l'amore comincia tu (Liebelei)" (Germany)
7" single "A far l'amore comincia tu (Liebelei) / Puisque tu l'aimes dis-le lui" (Netherlands)

A. "A far l'amore comincia tu (Liebelei)" (2:40)
B. "Puisque tu l'aimes dis-le lui" 2:40 [in French]
CBS 4771, CBS S 4771

== Charts ==
"A far l'amore comincia tu"
Chart (1977–1978)	Peak position
Belgium (Ultratop 50 Flanders)	1
Netherlands (Single Top 100)	3
Spain (AFYVE)	2
Switzerland (Schweizer Hitparade)	3
West Germany (GfK)	4

"Puisque tu l'aimes dis-le lui"
Chart (1977)	Peak position
Belgium (Ultratop 50 Wallonia)	35
France (IFOP)	20

"Do It, Do It Again"
Chart (1978)	Peak position
UK Singles (OCC)	9
Canada Top Singles (RPM)	20
