= A. J. Fullerton =

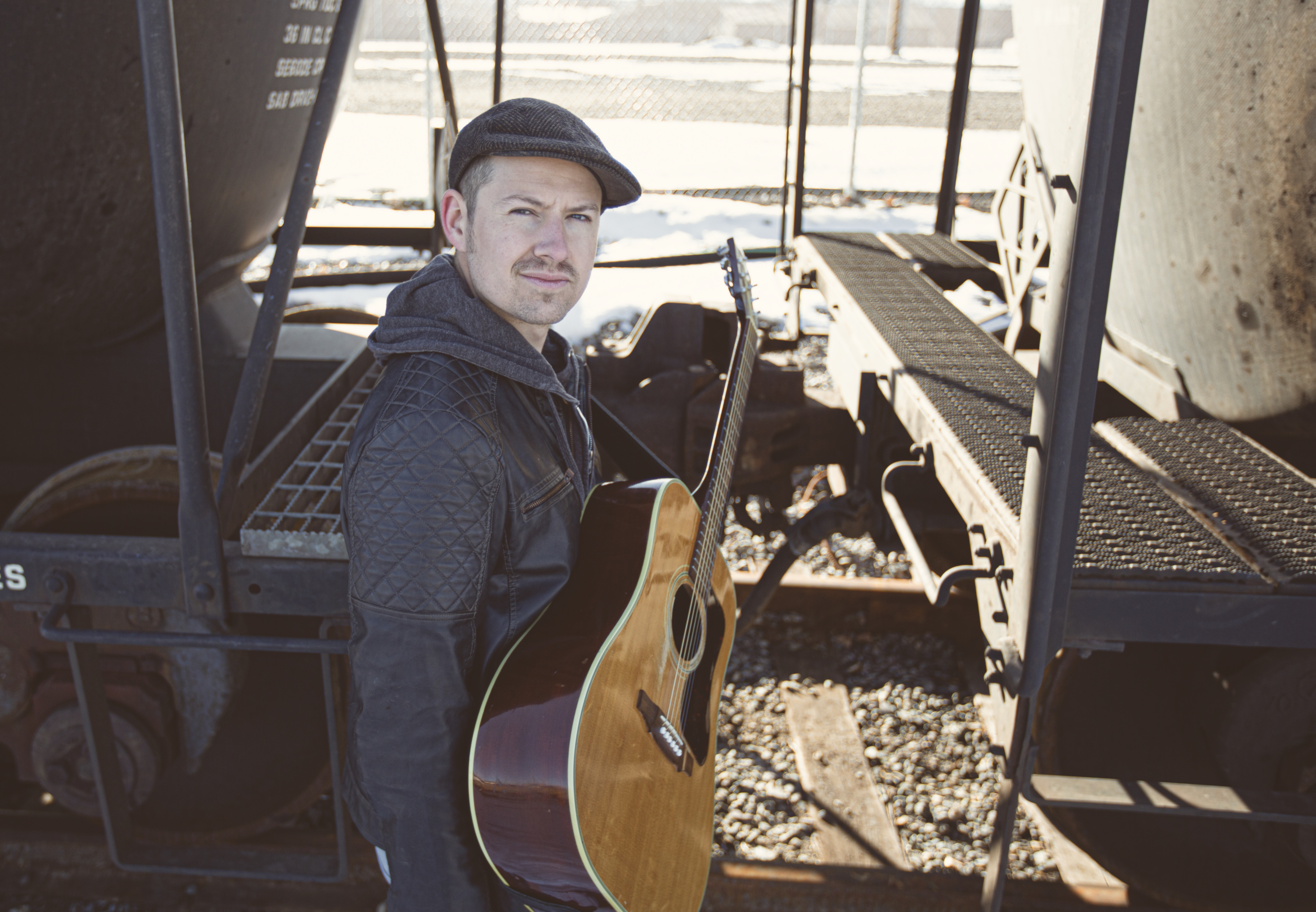

Background information
- Born: March 19, 1995 (age 30); Santa Fe, New Mexico, U.S.
- Genres: Blues rock; roots rock; blues
- Occupations: Singer-songwriter, Guitarist, Producer
- Instruments: Guitar; vocals
- Years active: 2009–present
- Labels: Gitcha Records, Color Red, Vizztone
- Website: www.ajfullerton.com

A. J. Fullerton is an American roots-rock and blues musician, born in Santa Fe, New Mexico, and raised in Montrose, Colorado. He learned guitar from his father, David Fullerton, who helped develop his distinctive finger-style and slide guitar techniques. Fullerton's music blends traditional blues with contemporary elements, drawing influence from blues legends like Mississippi John Hurt, Ry Cooder, and Taj Mahal, as well as more contemporary guitarist such as Luther Dickenson, Blake Mills, Buddy Miller, and Garret Mason. Fullerton's music combines influences of Mississippi Hill Country Blues with modern roots-rock, which has earned him a growing reputation in the Americana and blues scenes.

== Breakthrough and rise to prominence ==
Fullerton’s debut album, Kalamath (2017), showcased his guitar skills and storytelling. His second album, The Forgiver & The Runaway (2021), marked his breakthrough, debuting at #1 on the iTunes Blues Charts and topping the Colorado Roots Report. Produced by Canadian multi-instrumentalist Steve Marriner, the album solidified Fullerton as a prominent figure in contemporary blues. His latest album, Closer (2024), debuted at No. 7 on the Blues Billboard charts.

== Touring and collaborations ==
Fullerton has toured extensively across the U.S. and internationally, supporting blues and rock legends such as Robert Cray, Samantha Fish, Christone "Kingfish" Ingram, Charlie Musselwhite, Patrick Sweany, and Jimmie Vaughan. He has collaborated with artists including Tony Holiday, Grant Sabin, Cary Morin, and Jake Friel.

== Awards and critical acclaim ==
Fullerton has received 24 Colorado Blues Society Members' Choice Awards, including honors for Best Guitarist, Best Solo/Duo, and Best Songwriter, reflecting his wide respect within the Colorado music community.

He was also listed as one of "75 Modern Blues & Blues Rock Artists You Must Hear 2021" by Blues Muse Magazine. Fullerton was also featured in the October 2018 edition of Rolling Stone [France].

== Songwriting and production work ==
In addition to performing, Fullerton has worked as a producer and songwriter with several blues and roots artists. He co-wrote and produced tracks for Tony Holiday’s Motel Mississippi (2021), recorded at Jim Dickenson's Zebra Ranch Studios in Coldwater, Mississippi. His production helped shape the album’s blend of Mississippi Hill Country blues with modern influences.

Fullerton also produced Grant Sabin's album Work (2024) and Sweet Virginia's Leaving Again (2021) both released on Gitcha Records.

== Discography ==
- Kalamath (2017) [Self-released]
- Fullerton & Friel [Gitcha Records)
- The Forgiver & The Runaway (2021) [Gitcha Records]
- Closer (2024) [Color Red]

== Personal life ==
Fullerton has lived in various places, including Fort Collins, Colorado, and Memphis, Tennessee. He currently resides in Nashville, Tennessee, where he continues to tour and develop his musical career. He has no known spouse or children.
