= Felicità tà tà =

Studio album by Raffaella Carrà
- Released: 1974
- Genre: Pop
- Length: 35:56
- Language: Italian
- Label: CGD
- Producers: Paolo Ormi; Shel Shapiro

Raffaella Carrà chronology
Milleluci (1974)	Felicità tà tà (1974)	Forte forte forte (1976)

Singles from Felicità tà tà
- 1. "Rumore" Released: October 1974; 2. "Felicità tà tà" Released: October 1974

Felicità tà tà is the sixth studio album by Italian singer Raffaella Carrà, released in 1974 by Compagnia Generale del Disco.

The album includes the successful hits "Rumore" and "Felicità tà tà", which served the title theme of the 1974 TV show Canzonissima.

Although the album initially failed to chart, in 2024, due to the anniversary reissue from Sony Music, it reached 48th place in the Italian chart. It was also certified platinum in Italy.

== Track listing ==
Side A
No.	Title	Lyrics	Music	Length
1.	"Felicità tà tà"	Gianni Boncompagni; Dino Verde	Boncompagni; Paolo Ormi	3:09
2.	"Il guerriero"	Boncompagni	Boncompagni	3:12
3.	"Troppo ragazzina"	Boncompagni; Andrea Lo Vecchio	Boncompagni; Paolo Ormi	2:52
4.	"Sì, ci sto"	Boncompagni; Lo Vecchio	Clément Chammah; Shel Shapiro	4:26
5.	"Quando dico di no"	Carla Vistarini	Tony Cicco	3:18
Total length:				16:57

Side B
No.	Title	Lyrics	Music	Length
1.	"Rumore"	Lo Vecchio	Guido Maria Ferilli	3:36
2.	"Tabù"	Boncompagni; Lo Vecchio	Lo Vecchio	2:54
3.	"Prima di dormire"	Boncompagni	Paolo Ormi; Bobby Solo	3:01
4.	"Superman"	Boncompagni; Lo Vecchio	Chammah; Shapiro	3:16
5.	"Scordalo ragazzo mio"	Boncompagni; Lo Vecchio	Boncompagni; Franco Bracardi	3:14
6.	"Mi vien da piangere"	Boncompagni; Lo Vecchio	Bracardi	2:58
Total length:				18:59

== Personnel ==
- Raffaella Carrà – vocals
- Paolo Ormi – arrangement (tracks A1–A3, A5, B3, B5, B6)
- Shel Shapiro – arrangement (A4, B1, B2, B4)
- Giulio Natalucci – make-Up
- Chiara Samugheo – photograph
- Bruno Vergottini – stylist

Credits are adapted from the album's liner notes.

== Charts ==
2024 chart performance for Felicità tà tà
Chart (2024)	Peak position
Italian Albums (FIMI)	48
Italian Physical Albums (FIMI)	14
