= Tanti auguri =

Single by Raffaella Carrà

from the album Raffaella
- B-side: "Amoa"
- Released: 4 March 1978
- Recorded: 31 January 1978
- Genre: Pop; italo disco
- Length: 3:46
- Label: CBS Italiana
- Composer: Paolo Ormi
- Lyricists: Gianni Boncompagni; Daniele Pace
- Producer: Gianni Boncompagni

Raffaella Carrà singles chronology
"Black Cat" (1978)	"Tanti auguri" (1978)	"E salutala per me" (1979)

Music video
- "Tanti auguri" on YouTube

"Tanti auguri" (Italian pronunciation: [ˈtanti auˈɡuːri, ˈtantj -]; "Best Wishes" or "Best of Luck") is the seventeenth single by Italian pop singer Raffaella Carrà, published in 1978 by the Italian branch of CBS Records International and distributed by Sugar Music. It is considered one of Carrà's signature songs, an all-time favourite in Italy, and an LGBT anthem.

== History and content ==
"Tanti auguri" featured as the opening theme for the controversial Rete 1 TV program Ma che sera, with its video – Carrà's first appearance in colour – being shot at Italia in Miniatura in Rimini.

The lyrics describe an Italian woman's free sexual habits, celebrating "lovemaking" in all of her country, "both in the city and in the countryside" (in campagna ed in città). The opening line of the chorus, "come è bello far l'amore da Trieste in giù" ("how beautiful it is to make love from Trieste southward"), has become memorable among Italians.

The song was translated into Spanish by Manolo Díaz Martínez as "Hay que venir al sur" ("One Must Come to the South"), also performed by Carrà and becoming a hit across Spanish-speaking countries. Several covers were recorded, including by Anne Veski in Estonian under the title "Jätke võtmed väljapoole" ("Leave the Keys Outside"), by Paula Koivuniemi in Finnish under the title "Astun aurinkolaivaan" ("I'm Boarding the Sun Ship"), and by Asta Pilypaitė feat. Gintarė Karaliūnaitė in Lithuanian under the title "Debesėlis" ("Cloud").

Following Carrà's death in 2021, the single has had a resurgence, totalling over 25 million streams on Spotify and 20 million views on YouTube, earning her a posthumous gold certification for selling 35,000 copies.

== Track listings ==
=== Italian version ===
7" single – Italy (CBS 6133)

1. "Tanti auguri" (Paolo Ormi, Gianni Boncompagni, Daniele Pace) – 3:50
2. "Amoa" (Paolo Ormi, Gianni Boncompagni, Daniele Pace) – 3:25

7" single – Europe (CBS 6133)

1. "Tanti auguri" (Paolo Ormi, Gianni Boncompagni, Daniele Pace) – 3:50
2. "California" (Paolo Ormi, Gianni Boncompagni, Ann Reid Collin, Franco Brancardi) – 3:58

=== Spanish version ===
7" single – Spain (CBS 6090)

1. "Hay que venir al sur" (Paolo Ormi, Gianni Boncompagni, Daniele Pace) – 3:46
2. "Soy negra" (Paolo Ormi, Gianni Boncompagni, Daniele Pace, Manolo Díaz) – 3:43

7" single – Mexico (CBS 8035)

1. "Hay que venir al sur" (Paolo Ormi, Gianni Boncompagni, Daniele Pace, Manolo Díaz) – 3:23
2. "Lola" (Paolo Ormi, Gianni Boncompagni, Luis Gómez-Escolar) – 3:00

== Charts ==
=== Italian version ===
Weekly chart performance for "Tanti auguri"
Chart (1978)	Peak position
Italy (Musica e dischi)	9
West Germany (GfK)	45

Year-end chart performance for "Tanti auguri"
Chart (1978)	Position
Italy (Musica e dischi)	83

=== Spanish version ===
Weekly chart performance for "Hay que venir al sur"
Chart (1978)	Peak position
Spain (PROMUSICAE)	27

== Certifications ==
Certifications for "Tanti auguri"
Region	Certification	Certified units/sales
Italy (FIMI)	Gold	35,000^{‡}
^{‡} Sales+streaming figures based on certification alone.
