= Bárbara (film) =

- Directed by: Gino Landi
- Written by: Massimo Franciosa
- Starring: Raffaella Carrà; Jorge Martínez
- Edited by: Claudio M. Cutry; Sergio Zottola
- Distributed by: Editorial Crea
- Release date: 1980
- Running time: 100 minutes
- Country: Argentina
- Language: Spanish

Bárbara is a 1980 Argentine comedy film drama directed by Gino Landi. The film stars Raffaella Carrà as Bárbara, where she falls in love with an Argentine photographer (Jorge Martínez). Irma Córdoba also stars as The Dame. The film premiered on June 12, 1980 in Buenos Aires.

== Synopsis ==
A mysterious prince courts a famous singer.

== Cast ==
- Raffaella Carrà ... Bárbara
- Jorge Martínez (Argentine actors) ... Mauricio Karagorggevich (Mauro)
- Charlie Díez Gómez
- Jacques Arndt
- Carlos Bustamante
- Rubén Szuchmacher
- Juan Manuel Tenuta
- Cacho Bustamante
- Irma Córdoba ... La Dama
- Edda Díaz
- Arturo Noal
- Daniel Ripari
- Nino Udine
- Juan Carlos Villa
- Miguel Logarzo
