= Raffaella Carrà (1981 album) =

Studio album by Raffaella Carrà
- Released: 1981
- Genre: Pop; italo disco
- Language: Italian; English; Spanish
- Label: Hispavox
- Producer: Danilo Vaona Paolo Ormi

Raffaella Carrà chronology
Mi spendo tutto (1980)	Raffaella Carrà (1981)	Raffaella Carrà 82 (1982)

Singles from Raffaella
- 1. "Mamma dammi 100 lire" Released: 1981; 2. "Caliente Caliente" Released: 1981; 3. "Adios amigo" Released: 1981; 4. "Amore Amore" Released: 1982

Raffaella Carrà (in some countries released as Mamma dammi 100 lire) is a twelfth studio album by Italian singer Raffaella Carrà, released in 1981 by Hispavox, expressly made for the non-Italian market.

The album has never been released in Italy, but has been included in the artist's Italian discography because many of the songs included were also recorded in Italian. In Greece a version was distributed with almost all the tracks in Italian, but with the B side lacking the last song, similarly in Portugal, where the title of the album has also been translated: "Mamma dammi 100 lire".

Compared to the previous albums, the disc marks a turning point in the abandonment of Eurodisco sounds in favor of a more rock and new wave sound, as in "Caliente caliente" and "Amore amore", without losing sight of the singer's typical Latin style.

In Argentina the album was released with an extra track "Yo soy tana", not included in any other version.

== Overview ==
The album was distributed in Mexico, Peru, Argentina, Venezuela, Uruguay, Chile and Ecuador, with the first track titled "Mamá Dame 100 Pesitos". In Spain, Guatemala and Bolivia the title has become "Mamá Dame 100 Pesetas". The Colombian version of the album has a different track layout.

14 singles were extracted from the album (none for the Italian market), eleven 7" and three maxi 12", distributed between 1981 and 1982.

== Critical reception ==
Record World praised Raffaella Carrà, noting that the album delivers a lively and infectious collection of uptempo international tracks. Tracks such as "Mama dame 100 pesetas", "Amore, amore", "Adios amigos" and "Caliente, caliente" were highlighted, all showcasing her signature energetic style. The review emphasized the album's catchy melodies and danceable rhythms, presenting it as a vibrant continuation of Carra's successful musical approach.

== Commercial performance ==
According to Record World (December 5, 1981), Carrà performed with success at El Patio in Mexico City during her promotional tour in Mexico; the magazine reported that her album Raffaella Carrà, on Gamma Records, had sold 100,000 copies in the country, making it eligible for a Gold certification.

== Track listing ==
Raffaella Carrà Side A
No.	Title	Writer(s)	Length
1.	"Mamá dame 100 pesetas (in some countries is Mamá dame 100 pesitos)"	Danilo Vaona; Ignacio Ballesteros Diaz; Luis Gómez-Escolar	2:53
2.	"Amore Amore"	Danilo Vaona; Ignacio Ballesteros Diaz	2:35
3.	"Quiero cantar una canción"	Danilo Vaona; Ignacio Ballesteros Diaz; Luis Gómez-Escolar; Vincenzo Giuffrè	3:30
4.	"Oh Maria"	Danilo Vaona; Luis Gómez-Escolar; Vincenzo Giuffrè	3:18
5.	"Dame la liberdad"	Danilo Vaona; Luis Gómez-Escolar	3:26

Side B
No.	Title	Writer(s)	Length
1.	"Caliente Caliente"	Juan Carlos Calderón	2:35
2.	"Adiós Amigo"	Luis Gómez-Escolar; Pablo Herrero	2:50
3.	"Súper Rumbas (Meadley)"	García De Val; Monreal; Clavero; Paco De Lucía; León; Ceratto	3:34
4.	"México eres tú"	Boncompagni; Ignacio Ballesteros Diaz; Ormi	3:02
5.	"Noches Tropicales"	Boncompagni; Ignacio Ballesteros Diaz; Ormi	2:38
6.	"Por Tu Amor"	Boncompagni; Ignacio Ballesteros Diaz; Ormi	2:30

== Credits ==
- Raffaella Carrà – vocals
- Danilo Vaona – arrangement and production
- Paolo Ormi - arrangiament and production
