= Il vostro super agente Flit =

Il vostro superagente Flit
- Original film poster
- Directed by: Mariano Laurenti
- Written by: Franco Siniscalchi; Bruno Corbucci
- Starring: Raimondo Vianello; Raffaella Carrà; Pamela Tudor
- Cinematography: Tino Santoni
- Music by: Bruno Canfora
- Distributed by: Ima Film
- Release date: 10 September 1966
- Running time: 95 minutes
- Country: Italy
- Language: Italian

Il vostro superagente Flit (lit. Your superagent Flint) is a 1966 Italian spy comedy film that is a parody of Our Man Flint (Il nostro agente Flint). Starring Raimondo Vianello and Raffaella Carra, it was directed by Mariano Laurenti in his debut as a director and written by Bruno Corbucci, who also wrote the James Tont films.

== Plot ==
When the world is threatened by a series of mysterious catastrophic events from an unknown power from alien planet called Bral, only one man can save the planet...Your Man Flit.

== Cast ==
- Raimondo Vianello as Agent Flit
- Raffaella Carrà as Aura
- Fernando Sancho as Smirnoff
- Pamela Tudor as Mrs. Smirnoff
- Kitty Swan as Flit's girlfriend
- Ursula Janis as blonde Flit's girlfriend
- Alfredo Marchetti as Flit's chief Hayes
