= Disco Crash =

Studio album by Bob Sinclar
- Released: 20 February 2012
- Length: 52:26
- Label: Yellow Productions
- Producer: Bob Sinclar

Bob Sinclar chronology
Made in Jamaïca (2010)	Disco Crash (2012)	Paris by Night (2014)

Singles from Disco Crash
- 1. "Tik Tok" Released: 25 October 2010; 2. "Far l'amore" Released: 17 March 2011; 3. "Me Not a Gangsta" Released: 24 October 2011; 4. "Rock the Boat" Released: 19 December 2011; 5. "Fuck with You" Released: 23 April 2012; 6. "Groupie" Released: 27 August 2012

Disco Crash is the sixth studio album by French DJ Bob Sinclar, released on 20 February 2012 on Yellow Productions. It produced six singles: "Tik Tok" featuring Sean Paul; "Far l'amore" featuring Raffaella Carrà; "Me Not a Gangsta" featuring Mr Shammi and Colonel Reyel (a remix of the album track "Not Gangsta"); "Rock the Boat" featuring Pitbull, Dragonfly and Fatman Scoop; "Fuck with You" featuring Sophie Ellis-Bextor and Gilbere Forte; and "Groupie", a song included on the re-release.

== Critical reception ==
Professional ratings
Review scores
Source	Rating
AllMusic	2.5/5 stars

Jon O'Brien of AllMusic wrote that while Sinclar is "no stranger to the idea of the odd hook-up", Disco Crash represented the "first time he's assembled such an esteemed array of guests on one record". O'Brien highlighted "Fuck with You", "Put Your Handz Up" and "Magic Fly", but felt that "far too often, Sinclar descends into the kind of brainless novelty territory that seems more suited to a holiday camp disco than the super-clubs of Ibiza". He concluded that the album "occasionally harks back to his earlier and more palatable DJ days, but on the whole, it's a formulaic bandwagon-jumping affair suggesting that Sinclar is now content to play the fool".

== Track listing ==
Disco Crash track listing
No.	Title	Length
1.	"Rock the Boat" (featuring Pitbull, Dragonfly and Fatman Scoop)	3:54
2.	"Fuck with You" (featuring Sophie Ellis-Bextor and Gilbere Forte)	3:11
3.	"Wild Thing" (featuring Snoop Dogg)	4:51
4.	"Far l'amore" (featuring Raffaella Carrà)	3:01
5.	"Not Gangsta" (featuring Mister Shammi)	4:40
6.	"Life" (featuring Ben Onono)	6:36
7.	"Put Your Handz Up" (featuring Hot Rod)	4:23
8.	"Tik Tok" (featuring Sean Paul)	3:07
9.	"Around the World" (featuring Gilbere Forte)	4:19
10.	"Rainbow of Love" (featuring Ben Onono)	3:26
11.	"The Network" (featuring KC Flightt)	5:43
12.	"Magic Fly"	5:15
Total length:		52:26

Re-release bonus tracks
No.	Title	Length
13.	"Groupie"	3:05
14.	"House Music" (featuring Ron Carroll)	6:45
Total length:		62:16

== Charts ==
=== Weekly charts ===
Weekly chart performance for Disco Crash
Chart (2012)	Peak position
Belgian Albums (Ultratop Flanders)	30
Belgian Albums (Ultratop Wallonia)	26
French Albums (SNEP)	19
Italian Albums (FIMI)	49
Swiss Albums (Schweizer Hitparade)	31

=== Year-end charts ===
Year-end chart performance for Disco Crash
Chart (2012)	Position
French Albums (SNEP)	188
