= Discoring =

Italian music television show

- Created by: Gianni Boncompagni
- Country of origin: Italy
- Original language: Italian
- No. of seasons: 14

Original release
- Network: Rai 1
- Release: February 20, 1977 – May 26, 1989

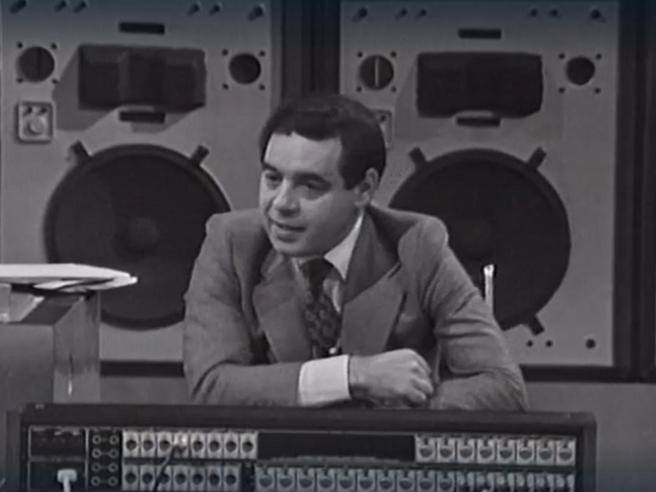
TV presenter Gianni Boncompagni during the inauguration of Discoring on Rai Uno

Discoring was a music show broadcast by Rai 1 from 1977 to 1989, created by Gianni Boncompagni, aired mainly on Sunday. The program could be considered analogous to the English show Top of the Pops.

== History ==
The first episode was broadcast February 20, 1977. The formula provided for the exhibition of Italian and international singers and groups (almost always in playback) and a rundown of the list of best selling albums and singles.

Over the years several presenters followed: Gianni Boncompagni (assisted by Antonella Giampaoli and then by Roberta Manfredi), Awana Gana, Claudio Cecchetto, the trio Anna Pettinelli - Isabel Russinova - Emanuela Falcetti, Jocelyn, Kay Rush, Sergio Mancinelli and Carlo Conti.

Several opening themes of the show, such as Bus Connection's Guapa and Baba Yaga's Che gatta charted and became minor hits at the Italian hit parade.

Together with Domenica in, Discoring is one of the few long-running RAI television colour programmes that was originally aired in black-and-white. Indeed, it aired in colour only since its third season in 1978–79. Further, in 1989, Rai broadcast in stereo the show's final season.
