= U Know It Ain't Love =

Single by R.J. featuring Pitbull
- Released: 28 November 2011
- Recorded: 2011
- Genre: Dance
- Length: 3:23
- Label: BIP; Kontor Records
- Songwriters: Giovanbattista Giorgilli; Armando Perez; Stephen Singer; Steve Obas; Shauna Gaye; Melissa McKenzie
- Producers: Stephen Singer; Vanni Giorgilli; David May; Michel Schuhmacher; Marc "Marquito" Zibung; Sebastian Knaak

R.J. singles chronology
"U Know It Ain't Love" (2011)	"Baby It's the Last Time" (2012)

Pitbull singles chronology
"International Love" (2011)	"U Know It Ain't Love" (2011)	"Rock the Boat" (2011)

Audio sample
- "U Know It Ain't Love": file; help

"U Know It Ain't Love" is the debut single by R.J., featuring vocals from American rapper Pitbull. The song was written by Giovanbattista Giorgilli, Armando Christian Perez, Stephen Singer, Steve Obas, Shauna Gaye, Melissa McKenzie and produced by David May, Michel Schuhmacher, Marc "Marquito" Zibung. It was released in Belgium and Kontor, Ultra Records, JVC Japan, as a digital download on 28 November 2011.

== Music video ==
A music video to accompany the release of "U Know It Ain't Love" was first released onto YouTube on 25 November 2011 at a total length of three minutes and twenty-nine seconds.

== Track listing ==
- Digital download
1. "U Know It Ain't Love" (David May Radio Edit) – 3:23
2. "U Know It Ain't Love" (David May Extended Mix) – 4:19

== Credits and personnel ==
- Lead vocals – R.J. and Pitbull
- Producers Stephen Singer, Vanni Giorgilli, David May, Michel Schuhmacher, Marc "Marquito" Zibung, Sebastian Knaak
- Lyrics – Giovanbattista Giorgilli, Armando Christian Perez, Stephen Singer, Steve Obas, Shauna Gaye, Melissa McKenzie
- Label: BIP Records

== Charts ==
Chart (2011–2012)	Peak position
Austria (Ö3 Austria Top 40)	52
Belgium (Ultratop 50 Flanders)	50
Belgium (Ultratip Bubbling Under Wallonia)	34
France (SNEP)	185
Germany (GfK)	49
Netherlands (Single Top 100)	18
Romania (Romanian Top 100)	29
Switzerland (Schweizer Hitparade)	43

== Release history ==
Region	Date	Format	Label
Belgium	28 November 2011	Digital Download	BIP Records
