= Raffaella Carrà 82 =

Studio album by Raffaella Carrà
- Released: 1982
- Genre: Pop; italo disco
- Language: Italian; English; Spanish
- Label: Hispavox
- Producer: Danilo Vaona

Raffaella Carrà chronology
Raffaella Carrà (1981)	Raffaella Carrà 82 (1982)	Fatalità (1983)

Singles from Raffaella
- 1. "Ballo Ballo" / "Dammi un bacio (Italy)" Released: 1982; 2. "Mamma dammi 100 lire (Mana dame 100 pesetas)" / "Bambina, si, si (Belgium, Portugal)" Released: 1982; 3. "Que dolor" / My love (Italy, Spain, Argentina, Guatemala, Ecuador, Venezuela, Poland)" Released: 1982; 4. "Dame un beso" / "Ni contigo, ni sin ti (Spain, mexico, Guatemala, Colombia)" Released: 1982; 5. "Eres un bandido" / "Esta historia (Spain, Bolivia, Peru, Mexico)" Released: 1982

Raffaella Carrà 82 (in some countries released as Raffaella Carrà, Bailo Bailo and Canta en italiano) is a thirteenth studio album by Italian singer Raffaella Carrà, released in 1981 by Hispavox, her fourth to be released also in United States.

Released following the great success of the Saturday night show "Fantastico 3", contains songs promoted during the program, including the only single extracted for the Italian market, whose side a "Ballo ballo" is the initial theme song of the broadcast. The song soon became a huge hit in Italy, dragging the single to number three in the weekly charts in early 1983 and finishing in number nineteen of the best-selling singles of that year

Also the song "Che dolor" will be used two years later, in its Spanish version, as the second theme song of the first edition of the program "Pronto, Raffaella?".

== Overview ==
The album was released in 1982 in Spain, Colombia, Ecuador, Uruguay, Mexico, Peru and Guatemala, with the tracks translated into Spanish and the addition of a new version of "Tuca tuca", a previous signature song of Raffaella, made to celebrate its tenth anniversary

In Argentina the title was changed to "Raffaella Carrà", the same in the United States the following year (1983), where however the additional track was omitted

In Portugal and Germany, however, the version with the tracks in Italian was distributed, also in Mexico with the title changed to "Canta en Italiano" to distinguish it from the one in Spanish for the same country. In Czechoslovakia the album has been distributed in 1984 with the songs in italian, with the title "Raffaella Carrà"

== Track listing ==
Raffaella Carrà 82 Side A
No.	Title	Writer(s)	Length
1.	"Ballo Ballo"	Bracardi; Boncompagni	3:00
2.	"Passerà"	Danilo Vaona; Ignacio Ballesteros Diaz; Daniele Pace; Gianni Gastaldo	3:45
3.	"Sei un bandito"	Danilo Vaona; Ignacio Ballesteros Diaz; Daniele Pace	3:16
4.	"Una coppia da buttare"	Bracardi; Giancarlo Magalli; Boncompagni	4:15
5.	"Mamma dammi 100 Lire"	Danilo Vaona; Luis Gómez-Escolar; Ignacio Ballesteros Diaz	2:57

Side B
No.	Title	Writer(s)	Length
1.	"Che dolor"	Danilo Vaona; Ignacio Ballesteros Diaz; Daniele Pace; Gianni Gastaldo	3:23
2.	"Dammi un bacio"	Danilo Vaona; Ignacio Ballesteros Diaz; Daniele Pace; Giuffrè	3:08
3.	"Bambina si, si"	Danilo Vaona; Ignacio Ballesteros Diaz	3:52
4.	"America"	Boncompagni	3:52
5.	"My love"	Felisatti; Escolar	2:43

Mamma Dammi 100 Lire, Canta en italiano, Bailo Bailo Side A
No.	Title	Writer(s)	Length
1.	"Que dolor"	Danilo Vaona; Ignacio Ballesteros Diaz; Gastaldo	3:27
2.	"Eres un bandido"	Danilo Vaona; Ignacio Ballesteros Diaz	3:15
3.	"Pasarà"	Danilo Vaona; Ignacio Ballesteros Diaz; Gastaldo	3:45
4.	"No, no vamos al mar"	Danilo Vaona; Ignacio Ballesteros Diaz	3:25
5.	"Te quiero porque si"	Luis Gómez-Escolar; Felisatti	3:00
6.	"Tuca Tuca (Spanish version) omitted in some countries"	Pisano; Boncompagni	2:32

Side B
No.	Title	Writer(s)	Length
1.	"Dame un beso"	Danilo Vaona; Ballestreros; Giuffrè	3:10
2.	"Bailo bailo"	Bracardi; Boncompagni; Ballestreros	3:03
3.	"Esta historia"	Bracardi; Boncompagni; Ballestreros	4:15
4.	"America (spanish version)"	Bracardi; Boncompagni; Escolar	2:38
5.	"Ni contigo, ni sin ti"	Bracardi; Boncompagni; Ballestreros	3:50
6.	"My love (spanish version)"	Bracardi; Boncompagni; Escolar	2:45

== Credits ==
- Raffaella Carrà – vocals
- Danilo Vaona – arrangement and production
- Paolo Ormi - arrangiament and production
