= Heroes of the West (1963 film) =

1963 film

- Directed by: Steno
- Written by: Sandro Continenza, Mario Guerra, Steno, Vittorio Vighi, Jose Mallorqui, Renzo Tarabusi
- Produced by: Emo Bistolfo
- Starring: Walter Chiari, Raimondo Vianello
- Cinematography: Tino Santoni Eastmancolor Vistavision
- Edited by: Giuliana Attenni
- Music by: Gianni Ferrio
- Distributed by: Variety Distribution
- Release date: 1963
- Running time: 95 minutes
- Country: Italy
- Language: Italian

Heroes of the West (Italian: Gli eroi del West) is a 1963 Italian Spaghetti Western film directed by Steno.

== Story ==
Two stage robbers impersonate the heirs of a gold mine but end up defending the families they intended to ripoff.

== Cast ==
- Walter Chiari as Mike
- Raimondo Vianello as Colorado
- Silvia Solar as Margaret
- Beni Deus as Bill
- María Andersen as Barbara
- Tomás Blanco as Mayor Ortes
- Miguel Del Castillo as Jessie
- Mónica Randall as Sherry
- Antonio Peral as Il Boia
- Mercedes Lobato, Bruno Scipioni, Xan das Bolas, Santiago Rivera, Adolfo Arles
