= Tino Santoni =

Italian cinematographer

- Born: 9 January 1913; Rome, Lazio, Italy
- Died: 14 October 1987 (aged 74); Rome, Lazio, Italy
- Occupation: Cinematographer
- Years active: 1931-1974 (film)

Tino Santoni (1913-1987) was an Italian cinematographer.

== Selected filmography ==
- The First Woman Who Passes (1940)
- Scampolo (1941)
- The Adventuress from the Floor Above (1941)
- Happy Days (1942)
- The Last Wagon (1943)
- The Models of Margutta (1946)
- The Two Orphans (1947)
- Torment (1950)
- The Young Caruso (1951)
- La paura fa 90 (1951)
- The Machine to Kill Bad People (1952)
- Torment of the Past (1952)
- Prisoners of Darkness (1952)
- Giovinezza (1952)
- The Tired Outlaw (1952)
- The Daughter of the Regiment (1953)
- Andalusia Express (1956)
- Violent Summer (1959)
- Un militare e mezzo (1960)
- The Betrothed (1964)
- Heroes of the West (1964)
- 002 Operazione Luna (1965)
- Il vostro super agente Flit (1966)

== Bibliography ==
- Christopher Wagstaff. Italian Neorealist Cinema: An Aesthetic Approach. University of Toronto Press, 2007.
