= Torment of the Past =

- Film poster
- Directed by: Mario Bonnard
- Screenplay by: Aldo De Benedetti; Ennio De Concini; Nicola Manzari
- Story by: Mario Bonnard; Guido Chiolo
- Produced by: Aleandro Di Paolo
- Starring: Carla Del Poggio; Hélène Remy; Marc Lawrence; Carlo Romano; Luigi Pavese; Raffaella Carrá
- Cinematography: Tino Santoni
- Edited by: Elsa Dubbini
- Music by: Hans Kemper
- Production company: Edizione Distribuzione Italiana Cinematografica
- Distributed by: Edizione Distribuzione Italiana Cinematografica
- Release date: 4 April 1952
- Running time: 96 minutes
- Country: Italy
- Language: Italian

Torment of the Past (Italian: Tormento del passato) is a 1952 Italian melodrama film co-written and directed by Mario Bonnard.

== Cast ==
- Hélène Rémy as Luisa
- Marc Lawrence as Andrea Rossi
- Raffaella Carrà as Graziella (credited as Raffaella Pelloni)
- Carlo Romano as Marco Ferretti
- Carla Del Poggio as Giulia/Florette
- Luigi Pavese as Bianchi
- Laura Gore as Florette's Maid
- Guglielmo Inglese as Giacomo
- Giulio Battiferri as Peppino
- Renzo Borelli as Accomplice of Bianchi
- Riccardo Garrone as Accomplice of Bianchi
- Paul Le Pere as Giovanni
- Natale Cirino as Padrone del barcone
- Rino Salviati as The Singer
