= Tony Holiday (musician) =

- Born: Rolf Peter Knigge; 24 February 1951; Hamburg, West Germany
- Died: 14 February 1990 (aged 38) Lausanne, Switzerland
- Genres: Pop, schlager
- Occupation: Singer-songwriter

Tony Holiday (born Rolf Peter Knigge; 24 February 1951 – 14 February 1990) was a German pop and schlager singer and songwriter.

== Career ==
Knigge was born in Hamburg. He began his career initially as a textile businessman and fashion designer. In 1974, he received a record contract with Hans Bertram, who rechristened him "Tony Holiday". His first two singles met with little success. Holiday's breakthrough came in 1977 with the German recording of Italian singer Raffaella Carrà's 1976 single "A far l'amore comincia tu", retitled "Tanze Samba mit Mir" ("Dance the Samba With Me"). The song quickly became a hit in both Germany and Austria, peaking at No. 4 on the German music charts and reaching the Top 20 on the Austrian music charts.

In 1979, he participated with the title "Zuviel Tequila, zuviel schöne Mädchen" ("Too Much Tequila, Too Many Beautiful Girls") in the German finals for the Eurovision Song Contest and the song finished in ninth place.

Between 1975 and 1984, Holiday performed 11 times on the popular German music television program ZDF-Hitparade.

In 1980, Holiday scored a second European hit with "Nie mehr allein sein" which reached the number 15 on the German music charts. The song was a reworking of "Sun of Jamaica" by the German band Goombay Dance Band. Holiday subsequently hosted several music programs on television and released several more singles throughout the 1980s.

== Death and legacy ==
Holiday was gay, but did not publicly acknowledge his homosexuality. He died on Valentine's Day, 1990 of an AIDS-related illness in Lausanne, aged 38, just ten days shy of his 39th birthday.

In 2000, Tony Holiday's single "Tanze Samba mit Mir" was prominently featured in the Teddy Award-winning François Ozon directed film Gouttes d'eau sur pierres brûlantes (Water Drops on Burning Rocks), an adaptation of the play Tropfen auf heiße Steine by German filmmaker and dramatist Rainer Werner Fassbinder.

== Discography ==
Albums

- 1977 Tanze Samba mit mir
- 1979 Rumba ok
- 1980 Nie mehr allein sein
- 2004 Tanze Samba mit mir (Posthumous collection)

Singles

- 1974 "Gewonnen" (as Peter Knigge)
- 1975 "Du hast mich heut' noch nicht geküsst"
- 1976 "Monte Carlo"
- 1977 "Rosy, Rosy"
- 1977 "Tanze Samba mit mir" (German chart peak position: #4. Austrian chart peak position: #19)
- 1978 "Disco Lady"
- 1978 "Es lebe Copacabana"
- 1978 "Den Appetit kannst du dir holen...doch gegessen wird zu Haus"
- 1979 "Zuviel Tequila, zuviel schöne Mädchen"
- 1979 "Samba olè, Rumba O.K."
- 1980 "Nie mehr allein sein" (German chart peak position: #15)
- 1980 "Auf dem Weg zum großen Glück"
- 1980 "Disco Donna"
- 1981 "Rio (de Janeiro)" (German chart peak position: #62)
- 1981 "Requiem für Sally"
- 1982 "Darf ich der Erste sein (Una Notte Speciale)"
- 1983 "Die selben Sterne leuchten auch für Dich"
- 1983 "Das sagt sich so leicht"
- 1983 "Die Karawane von Marrakesch"
- 1984 "Urlaubsreif"
- 1985 "Liebe ist..." (duet with Siw Inger)
- 1986 "C'est la vie" (with Foreign Currency)
- 1987 "Ma Ma Chérie"
- 1988 "Ta Ta Tanzmusik"
