= Rock the Boat (Bob Sinclar song) =

Single by Bob Sinclar featuring Pitbull, Dragonfly and Fatman Scoop

from the album Disco Crash
- Released: 19 December 2011
- Recorded: 2011
- Genre: Electro house
- Length: 3:54 (original mix)
- Label: Yellow Productions; Ministry of Sound Australia
- Songwriters: Christophe Le Friant; Armando Perez; Perla Meneses; Isaac Freeman; Kinda Hamid
- Producer: Bob Sinclar

Bob Sinclar singles chronology
"Far L'Amore" (2011)	"Rock the Boat" (2011)	"Fuck with You" (2012)

Pitbull singles chronology
"U Know It Ain't Love" (2011)	"Rock the Boat" (2011)	"Name of Love" (2012)

Fatman Scoop singles chronology
"Please Don't Break My Heart" (2010)	"Rock the Boat" (2011)	"Recess" (2014)

Audio sample
- "Rock the Boat": file; help

Music video
- "Rock the Boat" on YouTube

"Rock the Boat" is a song by French music producer Bob Sinclar featuring Pitbull, Dragonfly, and Fatman Scoop. It was released on 19 December 2011. The single peaked at number 22 on the French charts.

== Music video ==
A music video to accompany the release of "Rock the Boat" was first released onto YouTube on January 21, 2012, at a total length of three minutes and eight seconds. Pitbull does not appear on the video.

== Formats and track listings ==
- Digital download
1. "Rock the Boat" (Original Version) – 3:54
2. "Rock the Boat" (Radio Edit) – 3:08
- 6 track CD single – X Energy Italy – X 12384.12 CDS
1. "Rock the Boat" (Original Radio Edit) – 3:08
2. "Rock the Boat" (Original Club Version) – 5:06
3. "Rock the Boat" (Martin Solveig Remix) – 5:42
4. "Rock the Boat" (Bassjackers & Yellow Claw Remix) – 5:36
5. "Rock the Boat" (Ilan Khan Remix) – 6:19
6. "Rock the Boat" (Cutee B. Remix) – 5:49

== Credits and personnel ==
- Bob Sinclar – producer, keyboards, arranger, instrumentation, recording and mixing
- Armando C. Perez – vocals, songwriter
- Dragonfly – vocals
- Christophe Le Friant – songwriter
- Kinnda Kee Hamid – songwriter
- Maurizio Zoffoli – songwriter
- David A. Stewart – songwriter
- Annie Lennox – songwriter

== Charts ==
=== Weekly charts ===
Chart performance for "Rock the Boat"
Chart (2011–2012)	Peak position
Austria (Ö3 Austria Top 40)	51
Belgium (Ultratop 50 Wallonia)	15
Canada (Canadian Hot 100)	99
Canada CHR/Top 40 (Billboard)	46
France (SNEP)	22
Germany (GfK)	45
Global Dance Tracks (Billboard)	5
Hungary (Rádiós Top 40)	34
Italy (FIMI)	20
Netherlands (Single Top 100)	96
Romania (Romanian Top 100)	45
Russia Airplay (TopHit)	12
Switzerland (Schweizer Hitparade)	20

=== Year-end charts ===
Year-end chart performance for "Rock the Boat"
Chart (2012)	Position
Italy (FIMI)	98
Russia Airplay (TopHit)	148

== Certifications ==
Certifications for "Rock the Boat"
Region	Certification	Certified units/sales
Italy (FIMI)	Gold	15,000^{*}
^{*} Sales figures based on certification alone.
