= Gino Landi =

Italian choreographer (1933–2023)

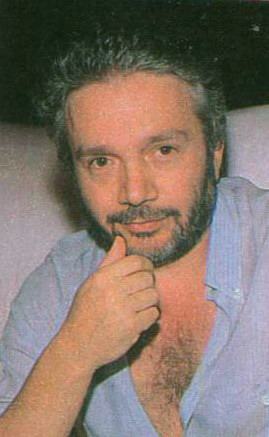
- Born: Luigi Gregori; 2 August 1933; Milan, Italy
- Died: 17 January 2023 (aged 89); Rome, Italy
- Website: http://www.ginolandi.it/

Luigi Gregori (2 August 1933 – 17 January 2023), popularly known as Gino Landi, was an Italian choreographer, and stage and television director.

== Biography ==
Gino Landi was born on 2 August 1933 in Milan on the stage of the Teatro Dal Verme to two variety artists who were working there. He began his career as a dancer but later changed to choreography. He was brought into the limelight by Erminio Macario while he was performing Bulli e pupe with Fanfulla.

== Career ==
Landi notably collaborated with composer Nino Rota, filmmaker Federico Fellini, and screenwriter Ennio Flaiano . He was the director of some of the editions of the Sanremo Festival, the Festivalbar, and musical comedies such as Rugantino and Roman Holiday, in conjunction with Garinei and Giovannini. He also directed some operas such as "Les contes d'Hoffmann" by Offenbach, "La Rondine" by Puccini, and "Il mondo della Luna" by Paisiello. Pippo Baudo, an Italian TV presenter, remarked:

I worked a lot with him, we did theater and a lot of television. All my Fantasticos were directed and choreographed by Gino Landi.

== Death ==
Landi died in his residence at Rome on 17 January 2023, at age 89.
