= Raffaella Carrà =

Italian singer and actress (1943–2021)

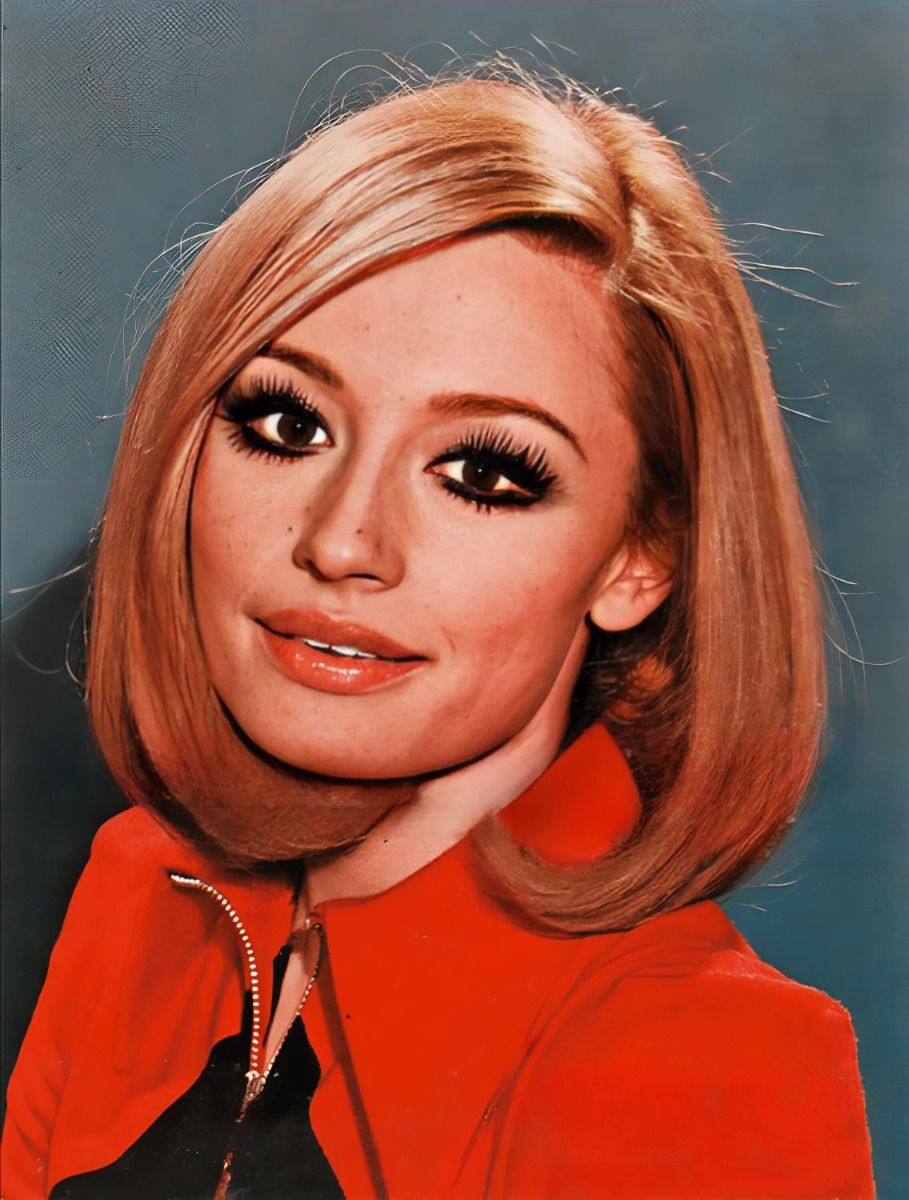
- Carrà in 1971
- Born: Raffaella Maria Roberta Pelloni; 18 June 1943; Bologna, Emilia-Romagna, Kingdom of Italy
- Died: 5 July 2021 (aged 78); Rome, Lazio, Italy
- Resting place: Porto Santo Stefano cemetery, Tuscany, Italy
- Occupations: Singer; actress; dancer; television presenter; radio presenter; model
- Years active: 1952–2021
- Musical career
- Genres: Pop; italo disco; R&B; Latin
- Instrument: Vocals
- Labels: RCA; CGD; CBS; Hispavox
- Website: raffaellacarra.com

Raffaella Maria Roberta Pelloni (18 June 1943 – 5 July 2021), known professionally as Raffaella Carrà (Italian: [raffaˈɛlla karˈra]) and sometimes mononymously as Raffaella, was an Italian singer, dancer, actress, television presenter and model. Widely considered a pop culture icon in Europe and Latin America, between the 1970s and 1980s she became a pioneer of feminism in the music and television industries, as well as a music icon, an LGBT icon and an icon of fashion and design.

Carrà released 25 studio albums in 37 countries, particularly in Europe and Latin America, selling over 60 million records worldwide, including "A far l'amore comincia tu", "Fiesta", "Forte forte forte", "Pedro", "Tanti auguri" and "Tuca tuca", singing in Italian, Spanish, English and French.

After an acting debut in Italy, Carrà signed a deal with 20th Century Fox in Hollywood, also starring in French and Spanish films, working with Mario Monicelli, Marcello Mastroianni, Frank Sinatra, Edward Mulhare, Trevor Howard, Jean Marais and James Coburn. She then became a successful TV host and personality in Italy, Spain and Argentina, receiving several awards including 12 Telegatto and two TP de Oro.

In 2021, Carrà was posthumously honored with the Sorriso Diverso Venezia Award at the 78th Venice International Film Festival for her contributions to Italian music and show business.

== Early life ==
Raffaella Pelloni was born on 18 June 1943 in Bologna to Raffaele Pelloni (1912–1996) and Angela Iris Dell'Utri (of Sicilian ancestry; 1923–1987), and had a younger brother named Vincenzo "Enzo" (1945–2001). Her parents, however, separated shortly after the wedding and Pelloni spent most of her childhood between her mother's bar and the ice cream shop in Bellaria – Igea Marina. At the latter establishment, she grew up watching the television programme Il Musichiere, learning by heart titles, ballets, and refrains of the songs.

When she was only eight years old, she left the Romagna coast to continue her studies directly in Rome at the National Academy of Dance. At the age of 14 she dropped out of ballet classes. In 1952 she began her studies at the Centro Sperimentale di Cinematografia until she graduated in 1960.

== Career ==
=== 1950s and 1960s: youth, early career and Hollywood ===
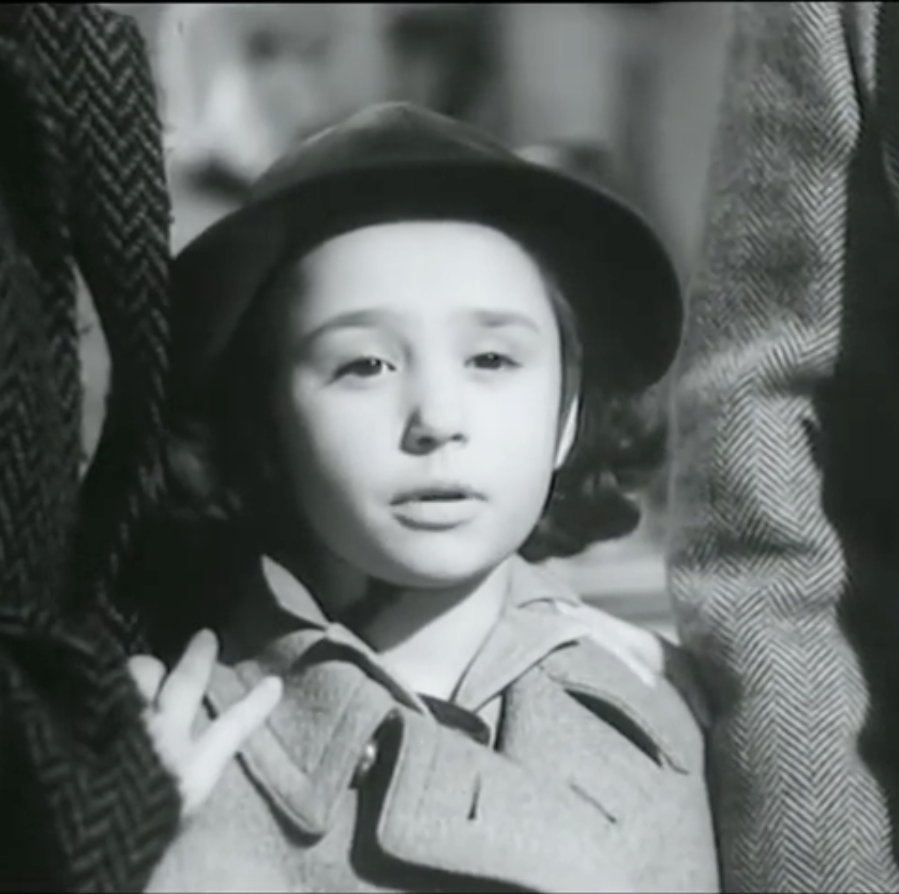
Carrà in Torment of the Past, 1952

At the age of 9, while walking with her mother in Rome and through a family friend, Pelloni met the director Mario Bonnard who cast her in his film Torment of the Past, in which she played the character of Graziella.

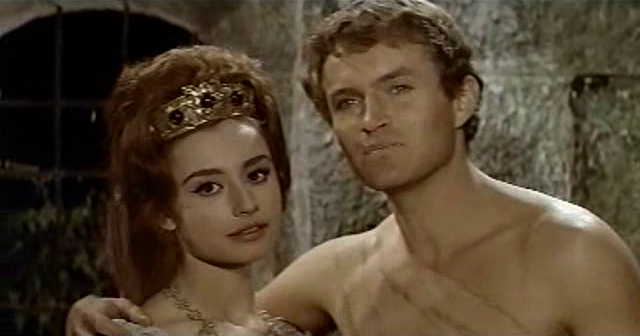
Carrà in Caesar the Conqueror, 1962

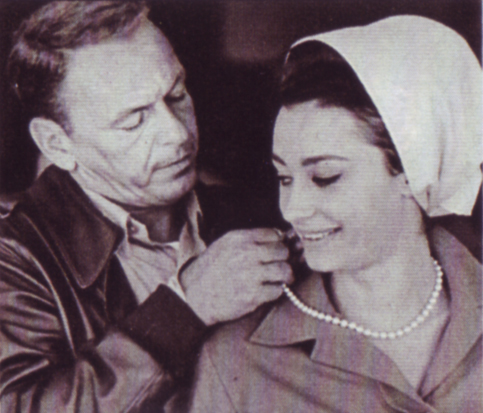
Carrà with Frank Sinatra in Von Ryan's Express, 1965

Pelloni made her debut as a recognized actress in 1960 in the film Long Night in 1943. That same year she worked in the French film La chance et l'amour with Michel Piccoli. She then appeared in many Italian peplum films, including Fury of the Pagans (1960), Atlas in the Land of the Cyclops (1961), Mole Men Against the Son of Hercules (1961), Ulysses Against the Son of Hercules (1962), Pontius Pilate (1962) and Caesar the Conqueror (1962), as well as comedies and action films such as 5 marines per 100 ragazze (1961), The Terrorist (1963), The Organizer (1963), and La Celestina P... R... (1965).

In the mid-1960s, director Dante Guardamagna gave Pelloni the pseudonym Carrà; fond of painting, he combined her real name, Raffaella, which reminded him of Raphael, with the surname of Carlo Carrà.

In 1965, Carrà moved to Hollywood after signing a contract with 20th Century Fox and following in the footsteps of her fellow artists Gina Lollobrigida, Sophia Loren and Virna Lisi, Carrà appeared in the film Von Ryan's Express alongside Frank Sinatra, Edward Mulhare and Trevor Howard. In 1966, she guest starred in an episode of the American television series I Spy with Bill Cosby and Robert Culp. Feeling homesick and not liking life in Los Angeles, she decided to return to Italy that same year where she starred in several Italian and French films such as The Saint Lies in Wait (1966), the Our Man Flint parody Il vostro super agente Flit (1966), Why Did I Ever Say Yes Twice? (1969), and Cran d'arrêt (1970), as well as a few television shows.

On 3 March 1967, Carrà was broadcast on the National Programme Tutto per bene, a TV adaptation of the novel of the same name by Luigi Pirandello.

In January 1968, she presented a special broadcast on the second national network, entitled Tempo di samba. In June of the same year, she participated in the play Processo di Famiglia, by Diego Fabbri and, at the end of the following year, she starred in Il sorriso della gioconda.

=== 1970s: international success ===
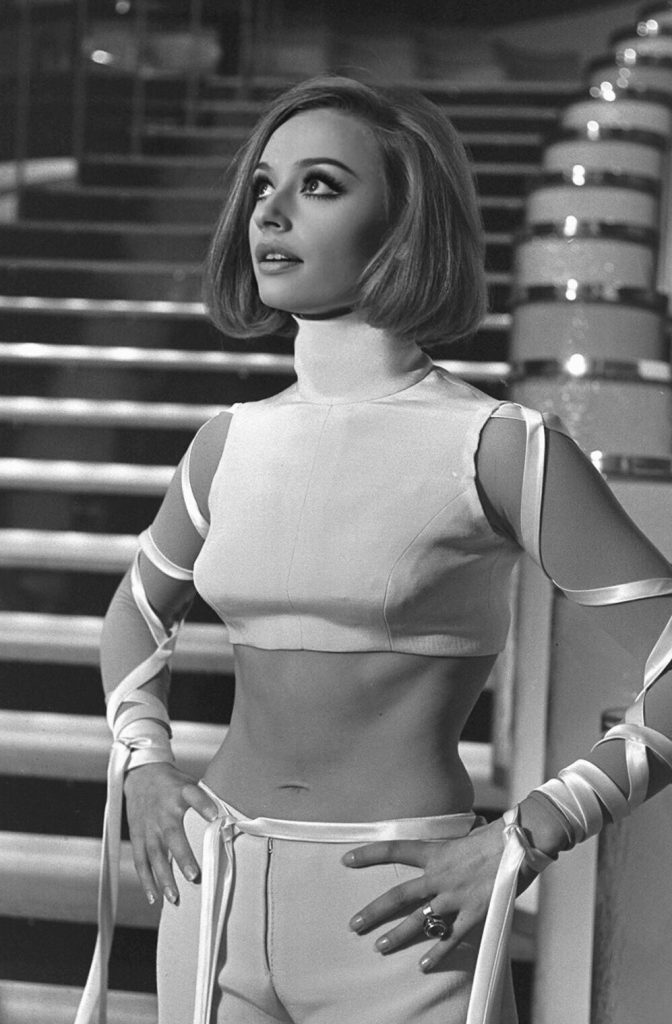
Carrà at Canzonissima 70, 1970

In 1970 Carrà participated as a guest actress in the programme Io, Agata e tu together with Nino Ferrer. Shortly after, Radiotelevisione italiana (RAI) hired her to present Canzonissima 70, a Saturday night show in which she was also an actress and dancer. She also presented Canzonissima 71 and Canzonissima 74 in which she released her hit single "Ma che musica Maestro" which sold 200,000 - 250,000 copies in Italy. In 1971, she participated alongside Georges Descrières in the French-produced television series Arsenio Lupin, starring in the episode entitled La donna dai due sorrisi. In 1974 she hosted on Rai Milleluci together with singer Mina Mazzini.

After her success on the Italian market, in 1975 Carrà made her first appearance in Spain on Televisión Española (TVE) when she performed in the variety show ¡Señoras y señores!; she subsequently released a compilation album with Spanish versions of her songs. In 1976, TVE hired her to host four episodes of the variety show La hora de....

During these years Carrà concentrated more on her singing career, achieving success in countries including Spain, Germany, France, Holland, Belgium, the UK, Greece, and in particular Latin American countries. One of her most resounding successes was the song A far l'amore comincia tu, the English version of which reached ninth place in the UK Singles Chart, besides obtaining several gold and platinum records worldwide.

In 1976 Carrà recorded the album Forte forte forte, which was released in 36 countries around the world, earning her a Gold certification in Canada. The album was followed up in 1977 with Fiesta, which features Eurodisco songs; the title track has been described as "symbol" of the soubrette.

In 1978 Carrà was a guest on the Chilean programme Sábado gigante. That year she released the song "Hay que venir al sur", the Spanish version of "Tanti auguri", and it was another of Carrà's greatest hits.

=== 1980s: return to RAI and success in Latin America ===
In 1980 she starred in the film Bárbara, shot in Argentina and distributed for the South American market and which was her last feature film as a leading actress. That same year she recorded the album Mi spendo tutto which features the song "Pedro", one of her biggest hits.

In 1981 she presented Millemilioni, which was the first experiment in international television cooperation: five specials, each filmed in a different capital: Buenos Aires, Mexico City, London, Rome and Moscow.

In 1982 she presented Fantastico 3 alongside Corrado, and sang the opening theme song, "Ballo ballo", a song that would be the focus of some controversy, as accused by some of plagiarising "Eleanor Rigby" by the Beatles.

Riding the wave of the success of Fantastico, the album Raffaella Carrà 82 was released; it was arranged and composed, among others, by Franco Bracardi and Danilo Vaona, and written by Gianni Boncompagni, Gianni Belfiore, and Giancarlo Magalli. Later that year, Carrà appeared as the guest of honour at the Viña del Mar International Song Festival in Chile.

In February 1983, she was also a guest at the Sanremo Music Festival 1983. "Soli sulla luna" and "Ahi" written by Valsiglio - Pace – Depsa, are songs recorded specifically for the occasion, recorded – "in a hurry" – as stated by the same singer.

From 1983 to 1985, Carrà presented Pronto, Raffaella?, the first midday programme on Rai that cemented her role as a presenter as the show became a success, with more than 14 million viewers tuning in to watch her interview of Mother Teresa of Calcutta. Carrà also sang the theme song of the programme: Fatalità.

The success of Pronto, Raffaella? won her the title of "Female TV Personality at European Level" in 1984, awarded by the European TV Magazines Association. In 1984 she signed a two-year, multimillion-dollar contract with kitchen manufacturer Scavolini, with the slogan "the most loved by Italians". That same year, the renewal of the contract with RAI was at the center of a heated controversy with the then prime minister, Bettino Craxi, who called the amount that the conductor would have earned for an exclusive three years "immoral and scandalous". During this time, Carrà released the albums Fatalità (1983) and Bolero (1984).

In the 1985–86 television season she was the presenter of the supershow Buonasera Raffaella, the first ten episodes of which were broadcast from Rome, while the last five were broadcast live from the studios of the Rai Corporation in New York and thanks to Rai International, visible throughout North and South America. Raffaella also interviewed and duetted with illustrious guests such as Henry Kissinger, Joe Cocker, Riccardo Cocciante, Patty Pravo, Stevie Wonder, Ginger Rogers and Sammy Davis Jr. and sang the theme songs "Fidati!" and "Bellissimo". The opening and closing theme songs of the programme are contained in the album Fidati!, released in the same year. The programme put Carrà once again at the centre of controversy because of high production costs, especially for the episodes transmitted via satellite from the United States. However, the transmission achieved great success, so much so as to arouse the interest of American televisions that invited Raffaella to the most famous talk shows of the time, interviewed by Johnny Carson, Ed Sullivan and David Letterman.

In the 1986–87 season, Carrà presented the programme conceived by Corrado in 1976 Domenica in, and sang both the opening theme song, "Curiosità", and the closing theme song, "Casa dolce casa". In November 1986, during a broadcast, Carrà reacted to an article published by the weekly scandal tabloid Novella 2000, threatening legal action against the newspaper, which had accused her of neglecting her dying mother. Raffaella's mother in fact died in 1987. Raffaella paid tribute during another episode of Domenica in, dedicating her song "I thank you life" to her.

In 1987 she struck a deal with Fininvest, with a multi-million dollar contract lasting two years. The first appearance on Canale 5 of Carrà dates back to 27 December 1987: on late evenings a special titled Benvenuta Raffaella was broadcast, and the Raffaella Carrà Show debuted shortly after on 9 January 1988. It was followed by Il principe azzurro, in the spring of 1989, which was the last programme presented by Carrà for Canale 5.

=== 1990s: work as a presenter ===
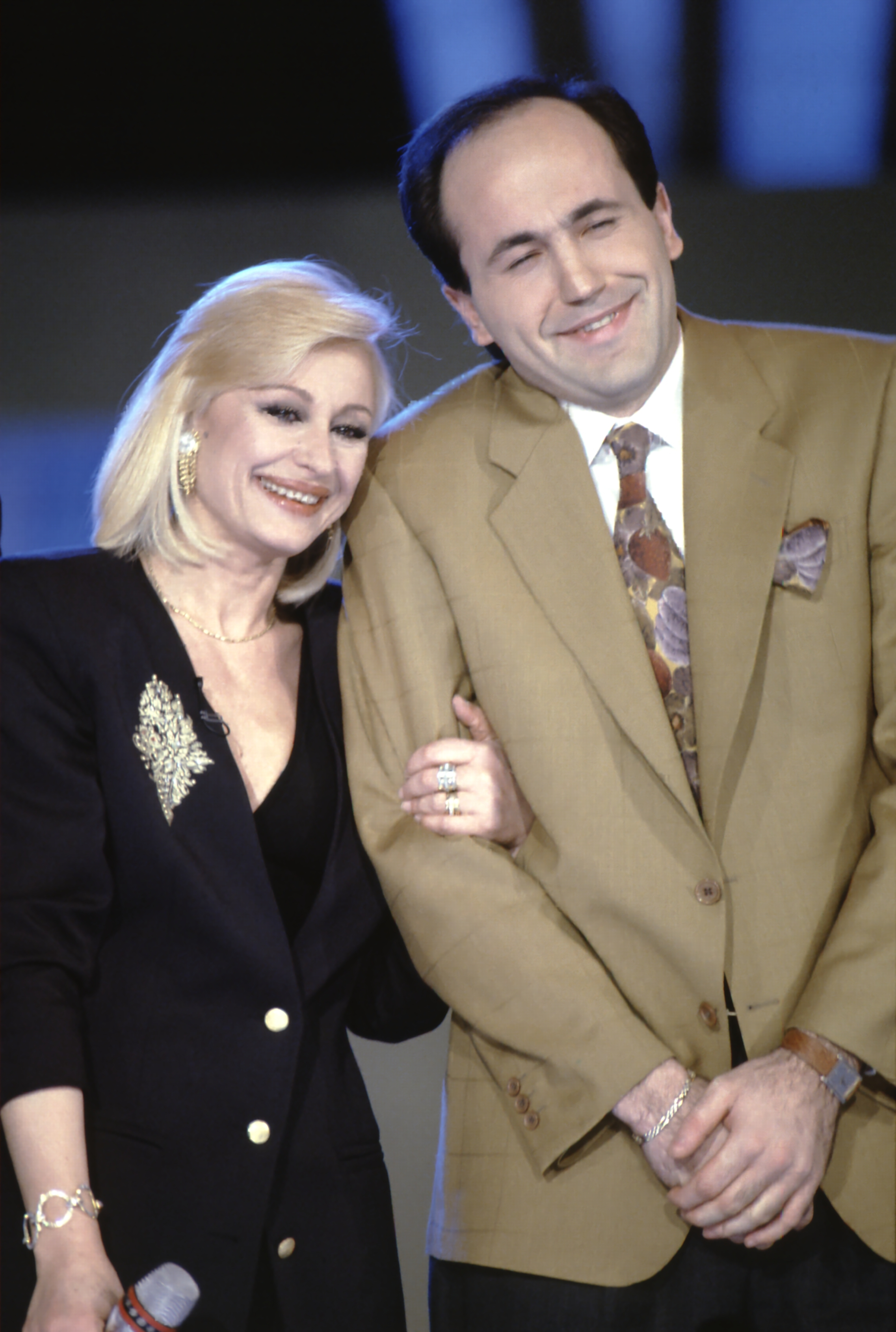
Raffaella Carrà and Carlo Frisi at Ricomincio da due in 1990

Once the experience at Fininvest was over, Carrà hosted the new programme Weekend of Rafaella in which she appeared with a new mature look abandoning tights and bodysuits. The programme had a sequel entitled Ricomincio da due.

In early January 1990, Carrà returned to Rai to host her new show Raffaella Venerdì, Sabato e Domenica... E saranno famosi.

In June 1990, she co-hosted alongside Gigi Sabani, Ricardo Fernández Deu and Miriam Díaz Aroca, Cuando calienta el sol, a two-part Rai and TVE jointly produced variety show aired live from Saint-Vincent in Italy and Tossa de Mar in Spain and broadcast simultaneously to both countries.

In May 1991, she presented the Telegatto awards with Corrado.

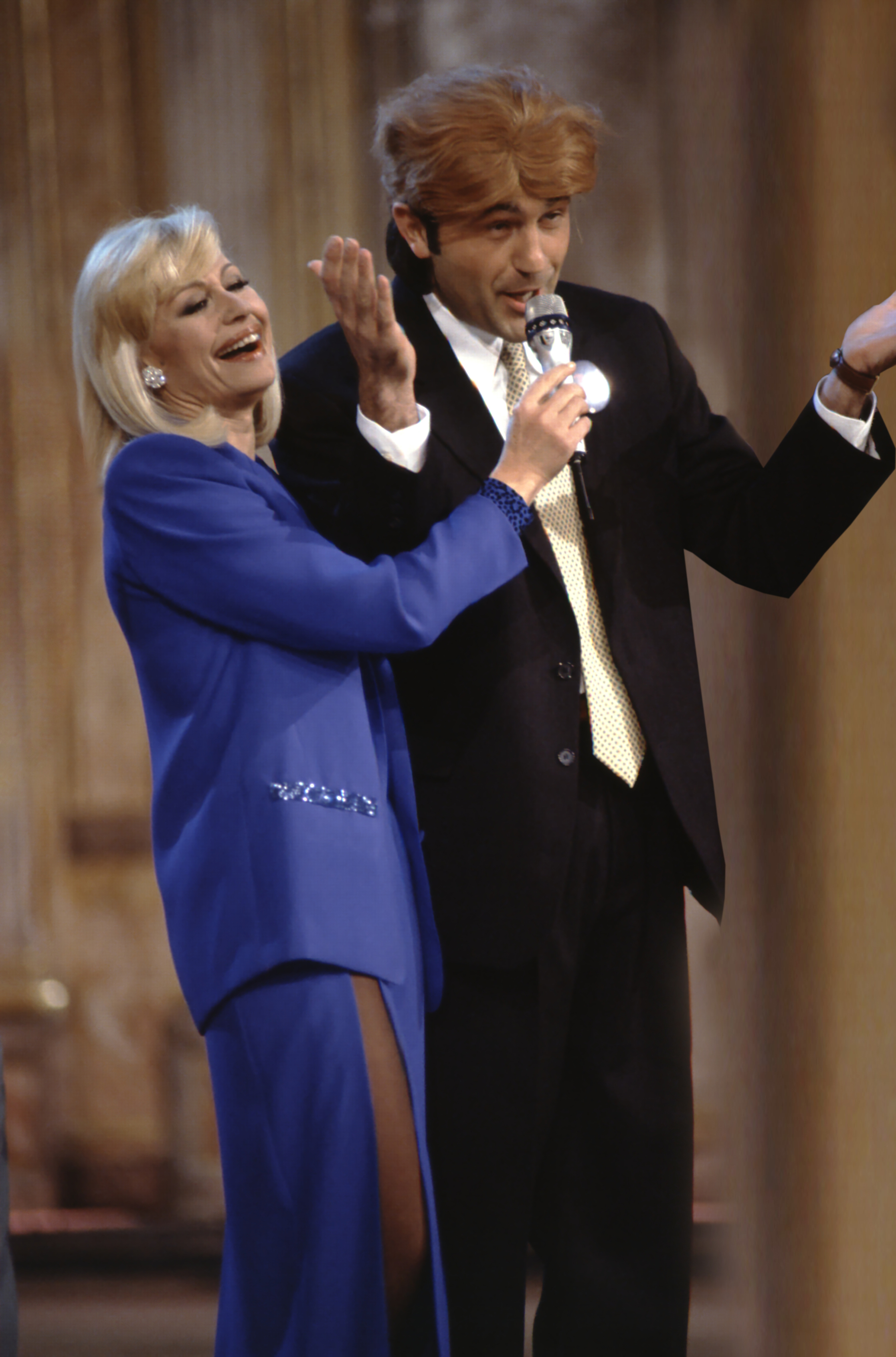
Carlo Frisi and Raffaella Carrà at Fantastico 12 in October 1991

Together with Johnny Dorelli, in 1991, she hosted the Saturday night show Fantastico 12 on Rai 1, which, despite controversy caused by Roberto Benigni's overly sexual antics, obtained ratings below expectations.

From 1992 to 1995 Carrà returned to TVE, conducting three seasons of ¡Hola Raffaella!, for which she won three TP de Oro and the early evening show A las 8 con Raffaella. In the 1994–95 season, she moved to the Spanish counterpart of Fininvest, Telecinco, with the afternoon programme En casa con Raffaella.

At the end of 1995 she returned to Rai 1 with Carràmba! Che sorpresa. While in 1996 and from 1998 to 2000, she hosted Carràmba! Che sorpresa, Carrambà! Che fortuna, 40 minuti con Raffaella, Centoventitré and I Fantastici di Raffaella.

In 1997 she also participated as a protagonist in a four-part RAI miniseries entitled Una mamma per caso, directed by Sergio Martino, in which she played the role of a single journalist. It was her last appearance on a scripted TV series. That year refused to host the Sanremo Music Festival 1997.

She welcomed 1998 co-hosting with Ramón García the TVE broadcast of New Year's clock bell strikes live from Puerta del Sol in Madrid.

=== 2000s: between Spain and Italy ===
In 2000 she presented the Gran Premio Internazionale dello Spettacolo with Paolo Bonolis.

The following year, alongside Piero Chiambretti, Enrico Papi, Megan Gale and Massimo Ceccherini, she hosted the 51st edition of the Sanremo Music Festival, which did not see a great amount of success. Carrà herself acknowledged that she was wrong to opt for a format that was more musical than television. After a break of about a year, Carrà returned to prime time on Rai 1 with the fourth edition of Carràmba! Che sorpresa. In 2004 she hosted the programme Sogni.

On 19 December 2004 she co-hosted with Ramón García and Loles León the nine-hours telethon Contigo on TVE. On 24 October 2005, she was invited to Diego Maradona's programme La Noche del 10 together with Robbie Williams. In the spring of 2006, Carrà hosted on Rai Amore, a replica of TVE's Contigo. It was dedicated to long-distance adoptions and it achieved nearly 150,000 adoptions.

Also in 2006, the actor Fabio Canino, assisted by Roberto Mancinelli, dedicated her a book named Raffabook. Più che un libro uno show del sabato sera. Around the same time, Tiziano Ferro published in the album Nessuno è solo the song E Raffaella è mia, dedicated to Carrà, who participated in the videoclip of the song, while the Spanish singer Roser recorded the album Raffaella, a tribute with Carrà's greatest hits sung in Spanish. In December 2006 she appeared at the gala for TVE's 50th Anniversary.

On 30 November 2007 Raffica was released, two CDs and a DVD which collated all the theme songs sung and danced by Raffaella throughout her career.

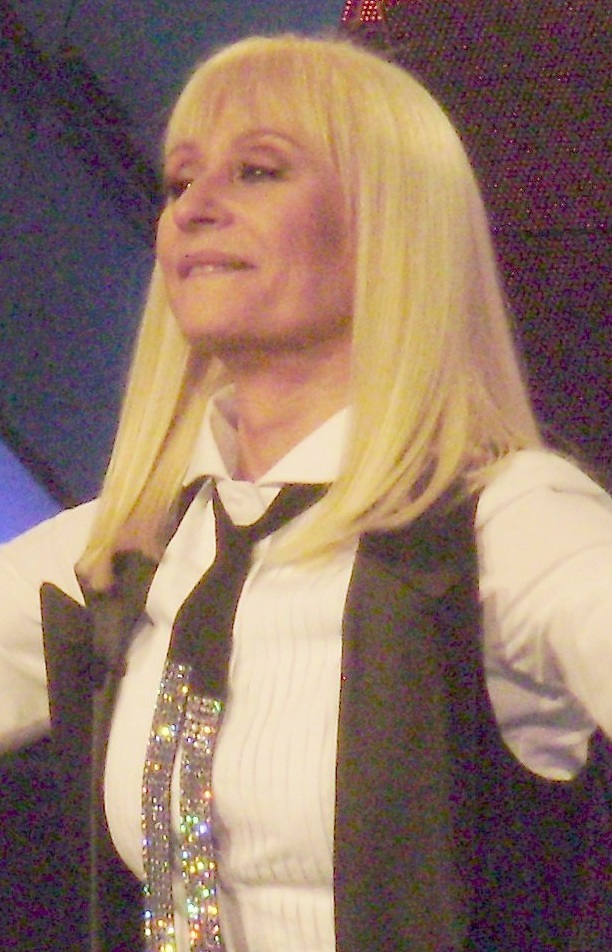
Raffaella Carrà in 2008

In 2008 TVE called her for three programmes related to the Eurovision Song Contest. The first was the selection process aired on 8 March Salvemos Eurovisión. She also presented two special galas related to this festival.

Shortly after, Carrà returned to Rai 1 to present a new edition of Carràmba! Che fortuna that was rewarded by the auditel, with an average of 5,000,000 daily viewers and a maximum of 6,000,000.

Subsequently, Carrà returned to Spain to host an episode of the Spanish version of Saturday Night Live on Cuatro in April 2009.

Also in 2008 the book Mito in tre minuti by Antimo Verde was published, an artistic biography based on research work. On 7 November of that year Raffica – Balletti & Duetti was released, a second box set of two CDs and a DVD with a selection of television performances by Carrà.

That same year Carrà hosted and produced Il Gran Concerto, a television programme in which RAI National Symphony Orchestra performed pieces of classical music and opera.

=== 2010s: sporadic appearances ===
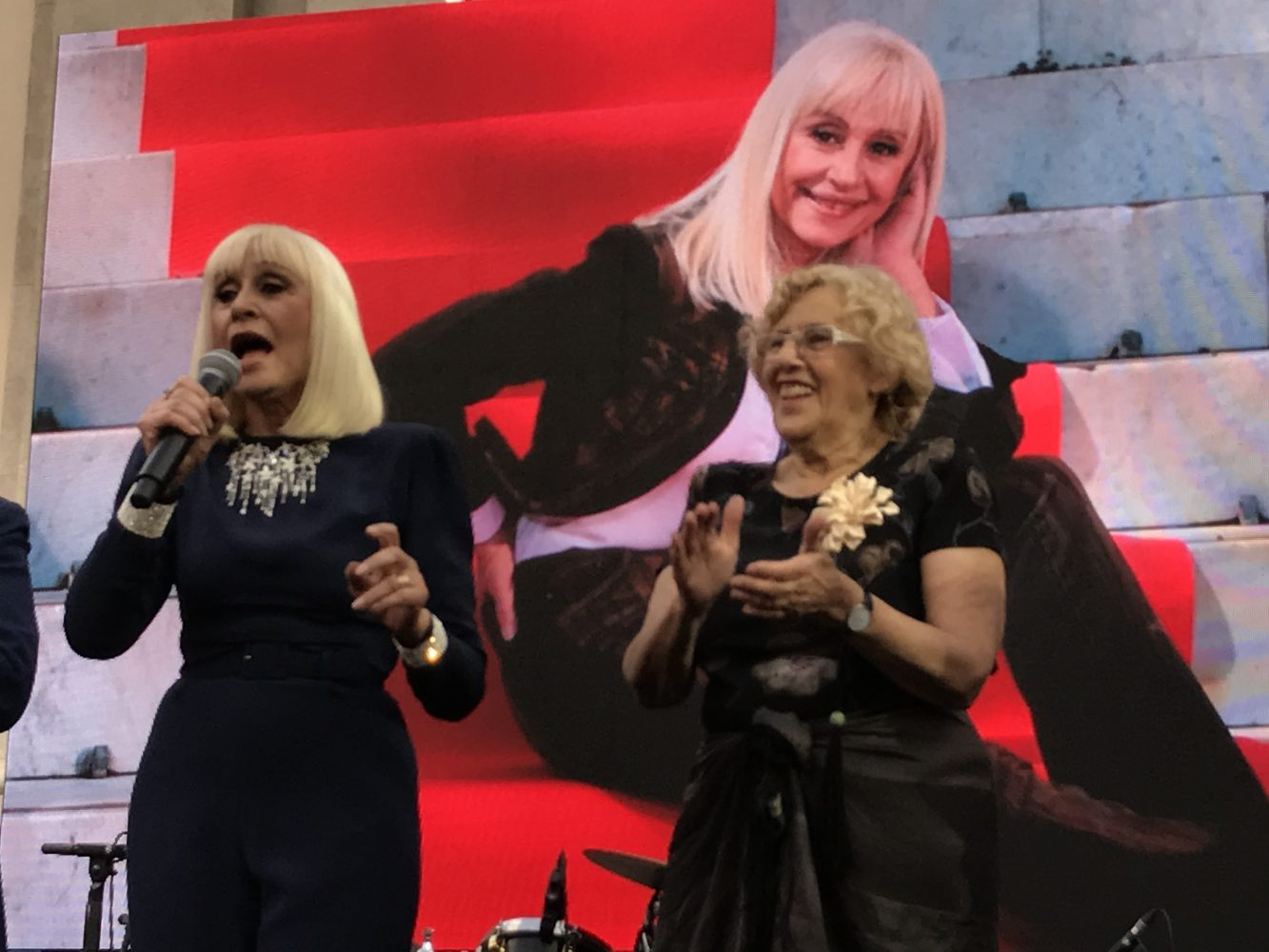
Raffaella Carrà in Madrid in 2017 together with the mayor Manuela Carmena

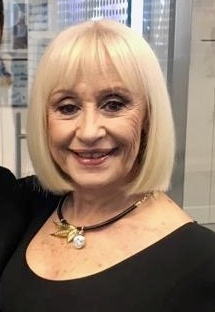
Carrà in 2018

In 2010 she duetted with Renato Zero on the song Triangolo from his album Sei Zero. The two also shared the stage at Zero's concert, on 5 October of the same year.

In 2011, after 13 years of absence, Italy returned to participate in the Eurovision Song Contest, and Rai chose Carrà to host and comment from Italy on the final night of the event, as well as present the votes awarded by the jury and televoting. In the summer of 2011 French DJ Bob Sinclar remixed her classic song A far l'amore comincia tu, which was retitled Far l'amore. This remix was later included by Paolo Sorrentino in the soundtrack of his Academy awarded film The Great Beauty.

Later, together with Neri Marcorè, she starred in various TIM commercials, playing Queen Isabella I of Castile. In October 2011, for the fourth consecutive year, she was once again the producer of the Rai 3 television programme Il Gran Concerto, hosted by Alessandro Greco.

In June 2012 she participated in the Concerto per l'Emilia in support of the people affected by the earthquake of 20 and 29 May 2012, in which she sang one of her hits, Rumore.

In January 2013, Carrà was meant to return, after ten years, to host the Saturday night show on Rai 1, but the programme, provisionally titled Auditorium was later cancelled. In February 2013 she became one of the coaches, along with Noemi, Piero Pelù and Riccardo Cocciante, in the programme The Voice of Italy on Rai 2.

On 16 July 2013 she released the dance single Replay, which was followed up by the album Replay (The Album). The album was released on 19 November 2013, along with the second single Cha Cha Ciao, seventeen years after her previous studio album.

That same year she appeared as herself in the movie Colpi di fortuna directed by Neri Parenti. In 2014 she participated again in The Voice of Italy as a coach with Piero Pelù, Noemi and rapper J-Ax.

In February of the same year she was a guest at the first evening of the Sanremo Festival, where she performed a medley of songs from her latest album.

In the 2014–15 television season she returned to Rai 1 with a new talent-show with Joaquín Cortés, called Forte forte forte.

Starting from 24 February 2016 she returned as a coach in the Rai 2 programme The Voice of Italy with Emis Killa, Max Pezzali and Dolcenera; during the final episode she announced that she would leave the programme. On 19 December 2016 she hosted 60 años juntos, TVE's 60th Anniversary Gala. In the summer of 2017 she became a music producer for one of her contestants, Samuel Pietrasanta.

On 30 November 2018, the Christmas album Ogni volta che è Natale was released, Carrà's last release before her death. The album features an unreleased track, Chi l'ha detto, which was sent to radios on 16 November and released on YouTube along with the music video on 23 November. On late 2018 she returned to the television scene after two years of absence, as a guest of Fabio Fazio at Che tempo che fa and by Carlo Conti at Un Natale d'Oro Zecchino. In the spring of 2019 she was the host of a programme of interviews with well-known personalities from show business, culture and sports, titled A raccontare comincia tu, broadcast on Rai 3 for six weeks. Due to its success, the programme was confirmed with a new cycle of four episodes, aired the following autumn.

=== 2020s ===
On 2 October 2020, the musical film Explota Explota (My Heart Goes Boom!), directed by Uruguayan Nacho Álvarez, was released in Spanish cinemas. In the film, based on Carrà's songs, she appears for a cameo. The film was nominated for three Goya Awards and three Feroz Awards. Since 25 January 2021, it has been available in the Italian version (with the title Ballo Ballo) on the Amazon Prime digital platform.

On 5 July 2021, after Carrà's death, RAI director Stefano Coletta revealed on television that there were plans to ask Carrà to present the Sanremo Festival 2022 and the Eurovision Song Contest 2022, which was set to be hosted in Italy. A three-episode docuseries about Carrà, titled Raffa, was released in 2023.

== Personal life and death ==
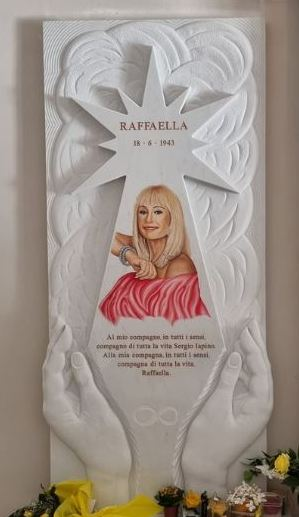
Commemorative plaque of Raffaella Carrà in the church of the municipal cemetery of Porto Santo Stefano

Carrà had a ten-year relationship with the television and radio presenter Gianni Boncompagni who was also the lyricist of her greatest musical hits. She later met Sergio Japino, who was 9 years younger than her and at that time was the choreographer in two of her programmes: Pronto, Raffaella? and Fantastico 3. Although they separated in the 1990s, they maintained a good personal and professional relationship to such an extent that it was he who announced Carrà's death in 2021. Previously, she had other romantic relationships with singer Little Tony whom she met in 1961 during the filming of the movie 5 marines per 100 ragazze, with Juventus footballer Gino Stacchini (which lasted eight years) and was also courted by Frank Sinatra, with whom she shared the set of the film Von Ryan's Express in 1965, but she rejected his flirting.

Carrà never married, stating that she "did not believe" in marriage. She did not have children, although she wanted to; when she tried to have children, her doctor told her that she would not be able to. Instead, she decided to adopt several children from around the world from a distance.

Raffaella Carrà was very attached to Monte Argentario in Tuscany, where she lived for many years. Her villa in Cala Piccola was a source of inspiration for many of her broadcasts, even for the title of the TV programme Carràmba! Che sorpresa. She was a big fan of football team Juventus.

A lifelong smoker, Carrà died in Rome on 5 July 2021, at the age of 78, from lung cancer, a condition she had not publicly disclosed and which had also caused the premature deaths of her non-smoking mother and brother. Two days later, the funeral procession was held from her home, passing through RAI's central studios, the Foro Italico and Teatro delle Vittorie to reach the Capitolium, where the mortuary chapel was set up at Rome's City Hall. Carrà's ashes, after being cremated according to her expressed will, were taken to the places most dear to the artist, including Porto Santo Stefano and San Giovanni Rotondo, in the Sanctuary of Saint Pio of Pietrelcina. Her ashes are preserved in the church of the municipal cemetery of Porto Santo Stefano.

== Cultural impact and philanthropy ==
Vogue España defined the artist an "intergenerational phenomenon, social and cultural in scope, destined to be remembered forever", while The Guardian considered her the "pop star who taught Europe the joy of sex" in Catholic bigotry. Rockol described Carrà as "a figure that has gradually become a pagan idol, scandalous and desired, capable of sending coded messages to queer people in Italy and at the same time consoling and keeping housewives company while they prepare lunch."

Throughout her career, Carrà's performance and work ethic have been compared to Donna Summer, Barbara Walters and Ann-Margret.

=== Anti-conservatism ===
On 13 November 1971, while hosting Canzonissima, Carrà performed her new single "Tuca tuca" wearing a top which showed her navel; she was the first woman to show it on Italian public television, at a time in which it was unusual for women to show their bodies. This event caused controversy in the conservative TV network RAI and was called "too provocative" by the Vatican newspaper L'Osservatore Romano.

In Spanish television, Carrà is considered among the pioneers of freedom of expression after the Franco dictatorship, as the artist appeared on television schedules in 1976, a year after Francisco Franco's death.

Carrà was a strong supporter of LGBTQ+ rights. She was awarded a "gay icon" award at the 2017 World Pride Madrid.

Carrà revealed in a 1977 interview that she was a communist. She said: "I always vote communist. On a struggle between workers and businessmen, I'll always be on the workers' side."

=== Fashion and pop icon ===
Carrà's style and stage presence were praised by liberal critics in the 70s and 80s, becoming a fashion icon over the years. The distinctive feature that made Carrà iconic was her platinum bob cut.

Vogue Espana defined Carrà's outfits as "visionary" and "controlled transgression" by the time she wore them, as a "new expressive shapes that were openly opposed to the established canons of patriarchal rulership, in a heretofore unthinkable kind of cathodic empowerment".

With Mina and Patty Pravo, Carrà is considered one of the pioneers of camp style, being cited at The Anna Wintour Costume Center, wing of the Metropolitan Museum of Art, during the spring 2019 exhibition by Gucci's Alessandro Michele.

== Honours ==
- Dame of the Order of Civil Merit, Spain (1985)
- Medal of the Order of Civil Merit, Spain (2018)

== Discography ==
=== Studio albums ===
Title	Album details	Peak chart positions		Certifications
Title	Album details	ITA	SPA	Certifications
Raffaella	Released: April 1970; Label: RCA Italiana; Formats: LP, CD	—	—	
Raffaella Carrà	Released: December 1971; Label: RCA Italiana; Formats: LP, CD	—	—	
Raffaella... Senzarespiro	Released: June 1972; Label: RCA Italiana; Formats: LP, CD	—	—	
Scatola a sorpresa	Released: November 1973; Label: CGD; Formats: LP	—	—	
Milleluci	Released: April 1974; Label: CGD; Formats: LP	—	—	
Felicità tà tà	Released: May 1974; Label: CGD; Formats: LP	—	—	FIMI: Platinum
Forte forte forte	Released: May 25, 1976; Label: CGD; Formats: LP	—	—	
Fiesta	Released: September 1977; Label: CGD; Formats: LP	—	4	
Raffaella; Hay Que Venir Al Sur	Released: March 4, 1978; Label: CBS; Formats: LP, Cassette tape	12	27	
Applauso - Aplauso - Canta En Español	Released: April 1979; Label: CBS; Formats: LP, cassette tape, CD	24	—	CAPIF: Platinum
Mi spendo tutto - Latino - ¡Bárbara!	Released: December 1, 1980; Label: CBS; Formats: LP, cassette tape, CD	—	—	
Raffaella Carrà - Mamma dammi 100 lire	Released: June 1981; Label: Hispavox; Formats: LP, cassette tape	—	19	PROMUSICAE: Platinum; AMPROFON: Gold
Raffaella Carrà 82- Raffaella Carrà - Bailo Bailo -Canta en italiano	Released: August 1982; Label: Hispavox; Formats: LP, cassette tape	42	18	PROMUSICAE: Gold
Fatalità	Released: 1983; Label: Hispavox; Formats: LP, cassette tape	53	—	
Bolero	Released: December 1, 1984; Label: CGD; Formats: LP, cassette tape	—	—	
Fidati!	Released: 1985; Label: Fonit Cetra; Formats: LP, cassette tape	—	—	
Curiosità	Released: October 1986; Label: Fonit Cetra; Formats: LP, cassette tape	—	—	
Raffaella	Released: 1988; Label: CBS; Formats: LP, CD	—	—	
Inviato speciale	Released: 1990; Label: Fonit Cetra; Formats: LP, CD	—	—	
Raffaella Carrà	Released: January 1991; Label: Fonit Cetra; Formats: LP, CD	—	—	
Hola Raffaella	Released: 1993; Label: Ariola Records; Formats: LP, CD	—	—	
Carramba che rumba!	Released: 1996; Label: Nueva Fonit Cetra; Formats: CD	—	—	PROMUSICAE: Gold
Fiesta – I grandi successi	Released: October 29, 1999; Label: RCA/BMG; Formats: CD	—	—	FIMI: Gold
Replay – The Album	Released: November 19, 2013; Label: Do It Yourself; Formats: CD	32	69	
Ogni volta che è Natale	Released: November 30, 2018; Label: Sony Music; Formats: LP, CD	9	—	

=== Singles ===
Title	Year	Peak chart positions	Certifications	Album
Title	Year	ITA	Certifications	Album
"Ma che musica maestro/Non ti mettere con Bill"	1970	2		Raffaella
"Reggae Rrrrr!"	1970	25		Raffaella
"Chissà chi sei/Dudulalà"	1971	—		Raffaella
"Chissà se va/Perdono, non lo faccio più"	1971	2	FIMI: Gold	Raffaella Carrà
"Tuca tuca/Vi dirò la verità"	1971	4		Raffaella Carrà
"Maga maghella/Papà"	1971	50		Raffaella Carrà
"Borriquito/Raindrops Keep Fallin' on My Head"	1972	39		Raffaella Carrà
"Tuca tuca, si/Accidenti a quella sera"	1972	—		Raffaella… Senzarespiro
"T'ammazzerei/Era solo un mese fa"	1972	16		Raffaella… Senzarespiro
"Din don dan/Bumba mama"	1974	27		Scatola a sorpresa and Milleluci
"Felicità tà tà/Ma che sera"	1974	4		Felicità tà tà
"Rumore/Sì, ci sto"	1974	3		Felicità tà tà
"Il guerriero"	1974	4		Felicità tà tà
"Male/Sciocco"	1975	22		Forte Forte Forte
"Tornerai/53 53 456"	1975	—	MC: Gold	Forte Forte Forte
"Forte forte forte/A far l'amore comincia tu"	1976	14	FIMI: Gold	Forte Forte Forte
"Fiesta"	1977	14	MC: Gold; PROMUSICAE: Gold	Fiesta
"Black Cat/California"	1977	—		Raffaella
"Tanti auguri/Amoa"	1978	38	CAPIF: Gold; FIMI: Gold	Raffaella
"E salutala per me/Ciak"	1979	19		Applauso
"Pedro"	1980	5	FIMI: Platinum	Mi spendo tutto
"Mi spendo tutto/Io non vivo senza di te"	1981	45		Mi spendo tutto
"Ballo ballo"	1982	3	FIMI: Gold	Raffaella Carrà 82
"Soli sulla Luna/Ahi"	1983	33		Non-album single
"Fatalità/Né con te, né senza te"	1983	15		Fatalità
"Que dolor/Spera, aspetta e spera"	1984	21		Fatalità
"Dolce far niente/Io ti amo"	1984	26		Bolero
"Buon Natale/Amico"	1984	—		Bolero
"Tele-Telefonarti"	1985	—		Bolero
"Fidati!/Bacio"	1985	20		Fidati!
"Voglio tutto, soprattutto te/Abbracciami"	1988	—		Raffaella
"Ballando soca dance/Sognando soca dance"	1990	17		Inviato speciale
"Rumore (Remix 91 Dance Version)"	1991	—		Raffaella Carrà
"Presidance" (with Elio e le Storie Tese)	1999	—		Tutti gli uomini del deficiente
"Rumore (2010 Remix)" (with Veerus & Maxie Devine)	2010	—		Non-album single
"Far l'amore" (with Bob Sinclar)	2011	6	FIMI: Platinum	Disco Crash
"Replay"	2013	31		Replay – The Album
"Cha Cha Ciao"	2013	—		Replay – The Album
"Forte" (with Bob Sinclar)	2015	—		Forte forte forte – Hits & Rarities
"Chi l'ha detto"	2018	—		Ogni volta che è Natale
"Feliz Navidad"	2020	—		Ogni volta che è Natale
"Rainbow Megamix"	2022	—		Joy
"Pedro (Jaxomy e Agatino Romero Remix)"	2024	44	IFPI DEN: Gold; FIMI: Gold; MC: Gold; PROMUSICAE: Gold	Non-album single

== Filmography ==
Film roles showing year released, title, role played, director and notes
Year	Title	Role	Director	Notes
1952	Torment of the Past	Graziella	Mario Bonnard	Credited as Raffaella Pelloni
1958	Valeria ragazza poco seria	Valeria's sister	Guido Malatesta	Credited as Raffaella Pelloni
1959	Europa di notte	Herself	Alessandro Blasetti	Documentary film
1959	Caterina Sforza, la leonessa di Romagna	Young woman	Giorgio Walter Chili	Uncredited
1960	Long Night in 1943	Ines Villani	Florestano Vancini	Credited as Raffaella Pelloni
1960	Fury of the Pagans	Maritza	Guido Malatesta	Credited as Raffaella Pelloni
1960	Il peccato degli anni verdi	Diana's friend	Leopoldo Trieste	Credited as Raffaella Pelloni
1961	Atlas in the Land of the Cyclops	Eber	Antonio Leonviola	
1961	5 marines per 100 ragazze	Mirella	Mario Mattoli	
1961	Mole Men Against the Son of Hercules	Princess Saliurà	Antonio Leonviola	
1962	Ulysses Against the Son of Hercules	Adraste	Mario Caiano	
1962	Pontius Pilate	Gessica	Gian Paolo Callegari	
1962	Caesar the Conqueror	Publia	Tanio Boccia	
1962	I Don Giovanni della Costa Azzurra	Waitress	Vittorio Sala	
1962	L'ombra di Zorro	Carmela	Joaquín Romero Marchent	
1963	The Terrorist	Giuliana	Gianfranco de Bosio	
1963	The Organizer	Bianca	Mario Monicelli	
1964	L'amore e la chance	Lisa	Charles L. Bitsch	Segment: "Lucky la chance"
1965	La Celestina P... R...	Bruna	Carlo Lizzani	
1965	Von Ryan's Express	Gabriella	Mark Robson	
1966	Red Roses for Angelica	Angelique	Steno	
1966	Il vostro superagente Flit	Aura	Mariano Laurenti	
1966	The Saint Lies in Wait	Anita Pavone	Christian-Jaque	
1969	7 eroiche carogne	Sara van Kolstrom	José Luis Merino	
1969	Why Did I Ever Say Yes Twice?	Teresa Coppa	Franz Antel	
1970	Cran d'arrêt	Alberta Radelli	Yves Boisset	
1980	Barbara	Barbara	Luigi Gregori	
1983	"FF.SS." - Cioè: "...che mi hai portato a fare sopra a Posillipo se non mi vuoi più bene?"	Herself	Renzo Arbore	Cameo appearance
2013	Colpi di fortuna	Herself	Neri Parenti	Segment: "Terzo episodio"
2020	My Heart Goes Boom!	Herself	Nacho Álvarez	Cameo appearance (Final film role)

== Television ==
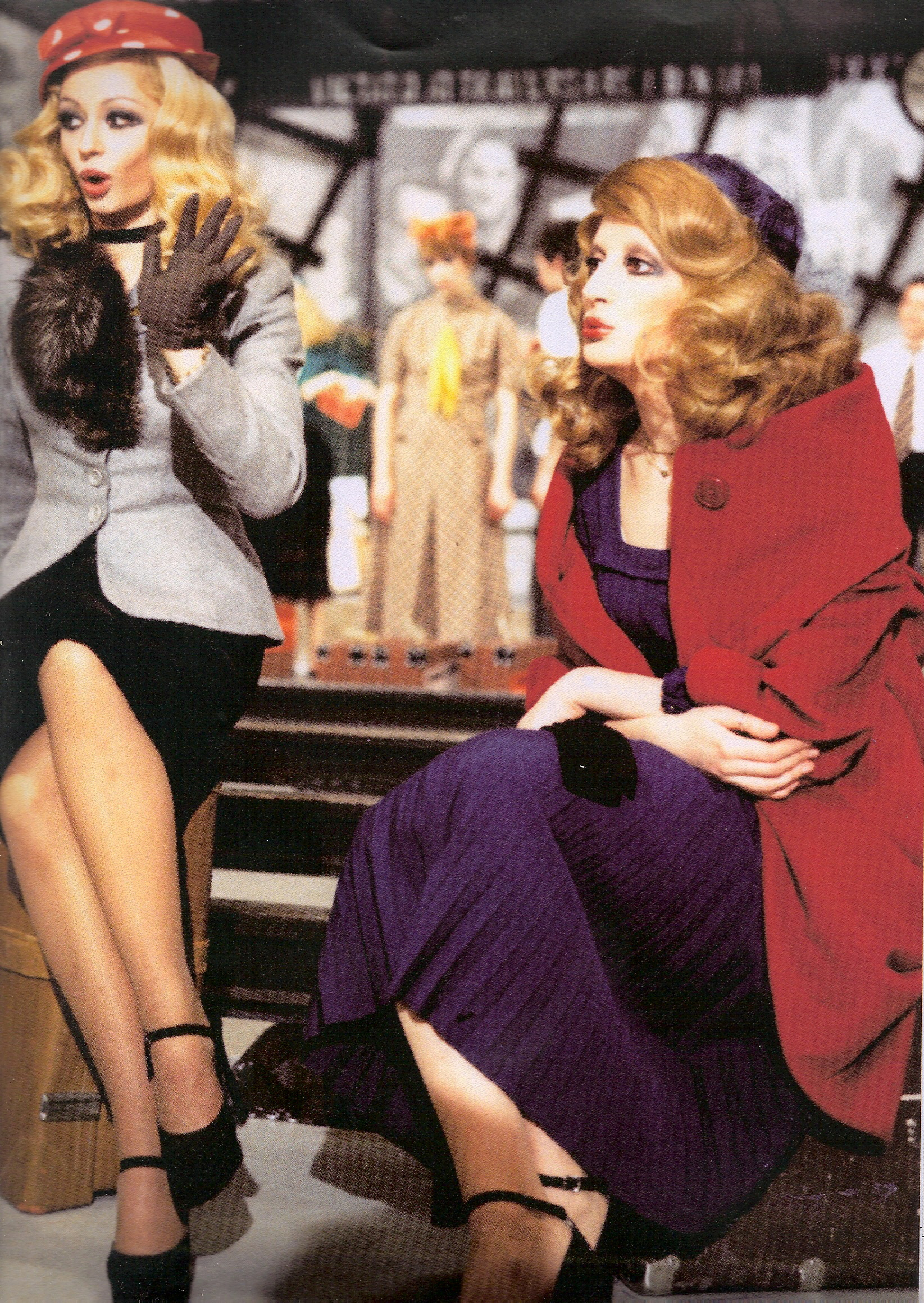
Carrà performing with Mina on Milleluci, 1974

Television roles showing year released, title, role played, network and notes
Year	Title	Role	Network	Notes
1962–63	Il paroliere questo sconosciuto	Herself/co-host	Rai 2	Variety show
1964	I grandi camaleonti	Ortensia	Rai 1	Main role; 8 episodes
1965	Lo stagno del diavolo	Marie	Rai 1	Television film
1965	Scaramouche	Costanza De Mauriac	Rai 1	Guest role; 2 episodes
1966	I Spy	Sophia	NBC	Episode: "Sophia"
1967	Del vento fra i rami del sassofrasso	Pamela	Rai 1	Television film
1967	Tutto per bene	Palma Lori	Rai 1	Television film
1968	Tempo di samba	Herself/co-host	Rai 2	Variety show
1968	Processo di famiglia	Bice	Rai 1	Television film
1968	Idillio Villereccio	Waitress	TSI	Television film
1969	Il sorriso della Gioconda	Doris Mead	Rai 1	Television film
1970	Io, Agata e tu	Herself/co-host	Rai 1	Variety show
1970–75	Canzonissima	Herself/host	Rai 1	Variety/musical show (seasons 8–9, 12)
1971	Arsène Lupin	Antonina/ Carmela	France 2	Episode: "La femme aux deux sourires"
1974	Milleluci	Herself/co-host	Rai 1	Variety show
1976	La hora de… Raffaella Carrà	Herself/host	TVE1	Variety show
1977	Ekeines… ki ego	Italian woman	Yened	Unknown episode
1978	Ma che sera	Herself/host	Rai 1	Variety show
1978	Raffaella Show	Herself/host	Rai 1	Variety show
1979	Raffaella Carrà Show	Herself/host	RSI La 1	Talk show
1981	Millemilioni	Herself/host	Rai 2	Musical program
1982–83	Fantastico	Herself/co-host	Rai 1	Variety show (season 3)
1983	Sanremo Music Festival 1983	Herself/Guest	Rai 1	Annual music festival, performing "Soli sulla luna"
1983	TG1	Herself/Guest	Rai 1	Daily news program
1983–85	Pronto, Raffaella?	Herself/host	Rai 1	Variety/game show
1985–86	Buonasera Raffaella	Herself/host	Rai 1	Variety show
1986–87	Domenica in	Herself/host	Rai 1	Information program (season 11)
1987	Benvenuta Raffaella	Herself	Canale 5	Special
1988	Raffaella Carrà Show	Herself/host	Canale 5	Variety show
1989	Il principe azzurro	Herself/host	Canale 5	Game show
1990	Raffaella Venerdì, Sabato e Domenica – Ricomincio da due	Herself/host	Rai 2	Variety show
1990–91	Ricomincio da due	Herself/host	Rai 2	Variety show
1991–92	Fantastico	Herself/host	Rai 1	Variety show (season 12)
1992–94	¡Hola Raffaella!	Herself/host	TVE1	Spanish version of Pronto, Raffaella?
1993–94	A las 8 con Raffaella	Herself/host	TVE1	Talk show
1995	En casa con Raffaella	Herself/host	Telecinco	Variety show
1995–2002; 2008–09	Carràmba! Che sorpresa	Herself/host	Rai 1	Italian version of Surprise Surprise
1996–97	40 minuti con Raffaella	Herself/host	Rai 1	Talk show
1997	Mamma per caso	Nicoletta Brizzi	Rai 1	Miniseries
1997–98	Campanadas	Herself/host	TVE1	New Year's special
1998–99	Centoventitré	Herself/host	Rai 1	Game show
1999	I fantastici di Raffaella	Herself/host	Rai 1	Variety show
2001	Sanremo Music Festival 2001	Herself/host	Rai 1	Annual music festival
2004	Contigo	Herself/host	TVE1	Telethon
2004	Sogni	Herself/host	Rai 1	Reality show
2005	Raffaella Hoy	Herself/host	El Trece	Variety show
2006	Amore	Herself/host	Rai 1	Italian version of Contigo
2008	Salvemos Eurovisión	Herself/host	La 1	Eurovision Spanish National Final
2009	Saturday Night Live	Herself/Guest host	Cuatro	Episode: "Raffaella Carrà"
2011	Eurovision Song Contest 2011	Herself/ Commentator and spokesperson	Rai 5, Rai 2	Annual music festival
2013–16	The Voice of Italy	Herself/Coach	Rai 2	Talent show (seasons 1–2, 4)
2014	Sanremo Music Festival 2014	Herself/Guest	Rai 1	Annual music festival
2015	Forte Forte Forte	Herself/Judge	Rai 1	Talent show (also co-creator)
2019	A raccontare comincia tu	Herself/host	Rai 3	Talk show

== Mass media references ==
- In "Midnight", the tenth episode of the fourth series of Doctor Who, a monitor transmitting entertainment programmes shows travellers a videoclip of Raffaella Carrà singing the song "Do it, do it again". Later in the same episode the audio track from the same videoclip can be heard in the background.
- In the British documentary "Television" on the fiftieth anniversary of the BBC, a song from one of Raffaella Carrà's shows acts as an example for new generation's morning shows.
- In the third episode of season one of Drag Race Italia, a spin-off of the RuPaul's Drag Race franchise, the contestants performed in a musical number dedicated to Raffaella Carrà, featuring a song written by Stefano Magnanensi, and modeled looks inspired by her most iconic outfits.
  - This would later be followed by a Night of 1000 Raffaella's runway on the seventh episode of the second season of Drag Race España.
