= Franco Bracardi =

Italian actor, composer, pianist, and stand-up comedian

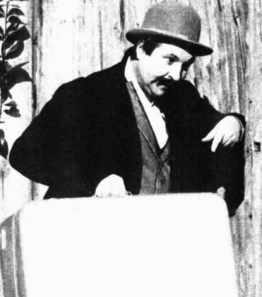
Franco Bracardi

Franco Bracardi (16 May 1935 – 27 February 2005) was an Italian actor, composer, pianist and stand-up comedian.

Born in Rome, during the first half of the fifties Bracardi began working as a jazz pianist in night clubs. In 1960 he became the pianist of The Flippers, a beat group which also included Lucio Dalla (sax, clarinet and vocals). Since mid-sixties he started composing songs for Mina, Mireille Mathieu and Raffaella Carrà, among others. During the same years he debuted as an actor and a comedian, performing at "Setteperotto", a small cabaret in Rome. He later starred in several films, mainly of humorous genre.

Bracardi became famous in 1970, thanks to the radio variety show of Renzo Arbore and Gianni Boncompagni Alto gradimento ("High liking"), where he was the score composer, an author and where he also gave voice to some grotesque characters such as Solforio, Mortification and Pallottin. Later he became the official pianist of Maurizio Costanzo in his long lasting television show Maurizio Costanzo Show. He was the younger brother of Giorgio Bracardi.
