= Gianni Boncompagni =

Italian television and radio presenter (1932–2017)

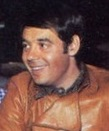
- Boncompagni in 1972
- Born: Giandomenico Boncompagni; 13 May 1932; Arezzo, Tuscany, Kingdom of Italy
- Died: 16 April 2017 (aged 84); Rome, Lazio, Italy
- Occupation: Presenter

Giandomenico "Gianni" Boncompagni (13 May 1932 – 16 April 2017) was a television and radio presenter, director, writer and lyricist.

== Life and career ==
Born in Arezzo, at 18 years old, Boncompagni moved to Sweden, where he lived for ten years doing various jobs, graduating from the Swedish Academy of graphics and photography and starting a radio career as a disc jockey. Married to a Swedish woman, after divorcing in the early 1960s, he moved back to Italy with his three daughters, and together with Renzo Arbore he created the radio programme Bandiera gialla, the first Italian musical programme focused on rock music and other avant-garde genres. In 1970 the duo Arbore-Boncompagni also created Alto Gradimento, an innovative and successful radio variety show which launched the career of several comedians, including the brothers Franco and Giorgio Bracardi.

Boncompagni made his television debut in 1977, as the presenter of the musical variety Discoring. In the mid-1980s, he got a personal success as the director and author of the television programmes Pronto, Raffaella? and Pronto, chi gioca?, and between 1987 and 1990 he wrote and directed the Sunday afternoon show Domenica in. In 1991 he moved to Fininvest, where he created the show Non è la Rai, which launched the career of several future actresses including Ambra Angiolini (presenter from the third season), Nicole Grimaudo, Romina Mondello and Sabrina Impacciatore. In the second half of the 1990s he came back to RAI, where he got a further success with the late night variety show Macao.

Boncompagni is also well known as a lyricist, and his collaborations include songs by Raffaella Carrà, Patty Pravo, Johnny Dorelli, Renato Zero, Jimmy Fontana, and Carmen Villani.

== Personal life ==
Boncompagni had a ten-year relationship with the television presenter and singer Raffaella Carrà. He also had relationships with actresses Isabella Ferrari and Claudia Gerini.

His younger daughter, Barbara (born in 1963), had a brief career in the 1980s as a singer and a showgirl.
