= List of Club 40 number-one hits =

This is a list of songs that have peaked at number one on the Club 40 French weekly music chart since its launch in April 2002.

== 2000s ==
N°	Date	Artist	Title	Number of weeks at no. 1	Notes
1	06/04/2002	Rohff feat. Kayliah	"Qui est l'exemple ?"	6	
2	18/05/2002	Mad'House	"Like a Prayer"	7	— New record for most time at no. 1
3	06/07/2002	Eve feat. Drag-On	"Got What You Need"	2	
4	20/07/2002	King of House	"Billie Jean"	2	
5	03/08/2002, 31/08/2002	Eminem	"Without Me"	4 (1 and 3)	
	10/08/2002	No charts (3 weeks)			
6	21/09/2002	Bluestar	"Sweet Dreams (Are Made of This)"	2	
7	05/10/2002, 19/10/2002	Las Ketchup	"The Ketchup Song (Aserejé)"	2 (1 and 1)	
8	12/10/2002	Praise Cats feat. Andrea Love	"Shined on Me"	1	
9	26/10/2002	King of House	"Can You Feel It"	6	— First artist to have two songs reach no. 1
10	07/12/2002	Ophélie Winter	"Sache"	1	
11	14/12/2002, 11/02/2002	Jennifer Lopez feat. Jadakiss & Styles P.	"Jenny from the Block"	3 (2 and 1)	
	28/12/2002	No charts (2 weeks)			
12	18/01/2003	Truth Hurts feat. Rakim	"Addictive"	2	
13	01/02/2003, 15/03/2003, 30/08/2003	Benny Benassi presents The Biz	"Satisfaction"	9 (1, 6 and 2)	— New record for most time at no. 1 — First song to reach no. 1 three separate times — The longest span between two accessions at no. 1 (15 weeks)
14	08/02/2003	Alphonse Brown	"Le Frunkp"	5	
15	26/04/2003	DJ BoBo	"Chihuahua"	1	
16	03/05/2003	Leslie feat. Magic System & Sweety	"On n'sait jamais (dans la vie)"	1	
17	10/05/2003	Laurent Konrad	"Rock u"	1	
18	17/05/2003	Tomcraft	"Loneliness"	1	
19	24/05/2003, 26/06/2003	Fight Club feat. Laurent Konrad	"Spread Love"	3 (2 and 1)	— Record: A second number one in less than a month by the same artist (Laurent Konrad)
20	07/06/2003	Anaklein	"Emotion"	2	
21	21/06/2003, 05/07/2003	113	"Au Summum"	3 (1 and 2)	
22	19/07/2003	Willy Denzey	"Le mur du son"	2	
23	02/08/2003	Sugar Daddy	"Sweet Soca Music"	1	
	09/08/2003	No charts (3 weeks)			
24	13/09/2003, 04/10/2003, 25/10/2003	Lorna	"Papi chulo... (te traigo el mmmm...)"	4 (2, 1 and 1)	
25	27/09/2003	Paul Johnson feat. Chynna	"Doo Wap"	1	
26	11/10/2003	Beyoncé feat. Jay-Z	"Crazy in Love"	1	
27	18/10/2003, 01/11/2003	The Underdog Project vs. Sunclub	"Summer Jam 2003"	5 (1 and 4)	
28	29/11/2003	Benassi Bros feat. Sandy	"Illusion"	3	
	20/12/2003	No charts (2 weeks)			
29	03/01/2004	Fatman Scoop feat. The Crooklyn Clan	"Be Faithful"	1	
30	10/01/2004, 24/01/2004, 07/02/2004	Tragédie	"Sexy pour moi"	3 (1, 1 and 1)	
31	17/01/2004	Lorna	"Papito Ven A Mi"	1	
32	31/01/2004	Molella	"Baby"	1	
33	12/02/2004, 06/03/2004	R Jam	"I Like to Move It"	3 (2 and 1)	
34	28/02/2004	The Black Eyed Peas	"Shut Up"	1	
35	13/03/2004	Danzel	"Pump It Up!"	6	
36	24/04/2004, 15/05/2004, 05/06/2004	Usher feat. Lil Jon & Ludacris	"Yeah!"	3 (1, 1 and 1)	
37	01/05/2004, 26/06/2004	Royal Gigolos	"California Dreamin'"	4 (2 and 2)	
38	22/05/2004, 12/06/2004	Benassi Bros feat. Dhany	"Hit My Heart"	2 (1 and 1)	
39	29/05/2004	O-Zone	"Dragostea din tei"	1	
40	19/06/2004	Leslie feat. Amine	"Sobri (notre destin)"	1	
41	10/07/2004	K.Maro	"Femme Like U (Donne moi ton corps)"	1	
42	17/07/2004	Nâdiya feat. Smartzee	"Et c'est parti..."	2	
43	31/07/2004	Houston feat. Chingy & Nate Dogg & I-20	"I Like That"	1	
	07/08/2004	No charts (3 weeks)			
44	28/08/2004	Speedy feat. Lumidee	"Siéntelo"	1	
45	04/09/2004	Royal Gigolos	"No Milk Today"	2	
46	18/09/2004, 02/10/2004	The Black Eyed Peas	"Let's Get It Started"	2 (1 and 1)	
47	25/09/2004, 09/10/2004, 23/10/2004	Shana Vanguarde	"Gimme! Gimme! Gimme! (A Man After Midnight)"	3 (1, 1 and 1)	
48	16/10/2004	Dante Thomas	"Get It On"	1	
49	30/10/2004, 21/11/2004	Starsailor	"Four to the Floor"	7 (3 and 4)	
50	20/11/2004	Tragédie	"Gentleman"	1	
	25/12/2004	No charts (2 weeks)			
51	08/01/2005	Eric Prydz	"Call on Me"	6	
52	19/02/2005, 30/04/2005	Jennifer Lopez	"Get Right"	9 (8 and 1)	
53	16/04/2005	N.O.R.E. feat. Nina Sky & Daddy Yankee & Big Mato & Gem Star	"Oye Mi Canto"	2	
54	07/05/2005, 25/06/2005	Yves Larock feat. Roland Richards	"Zookey (Lift Your Leg Up)"	5 (4 and 1)	— The most-played song of 2005
55	04/06/2005, 02/07/2005, 16/07/2005	Gwen Stefani feat. Eve	"Rich Girl"	5 (3, 1 and 1)	
56	09/07/2005, 23/07/2005, 27/08/2005	Magic System feat. Mokobé	"Bouger bouger"	4 (1, 1 and 2)	
57	30/07/2005	Crazy Frog	"Axel F"	1	
	06/08/2005	No charts (3 weeks)			
58	10/09/2005, 01/10/2005	Bob Sinclar feat. Gary Pine	"Love Generation"	8 (1 and 7)	
59	17/09/2005	The Drill	"The Drill"	2	
60	19/11/2005	Rihanna	"Pon De Replay"	1	
61	26/11/2005, 17/12/2005, 07/01/2006	Pakito	"Living on Video"	9 (2, 1 and 6)	— The most played song of 2006
62	10/12/2005	Ze Pequeño	"Le Centre Du Monde"	1	
	24/12/2005	No charts (2 weeks)			
63	18/02/2006	Hi_Tack	"Say Say Say (Waiting 4 U)"	2	
64	04/03/2006, 25/03/2006, 29/04/2006	Sean Paul	"Temperature"	7 (2, 4 and 1)	
65	18/03/2006	Martin Solveig feat. Lee Fields	"Jealousy"	1	
66	22/04/2006, 06/05/2006, 17/06/2006	Bob Sinclar feat. Steve Edwards	"World, Hold On (Children of the Sky)"	7 (1, 5 and 1)	
67	10/06/2006, 24/06/2006	Shakira feat. Wyclef Jean	"Hips Don't Lie"	2 (1 and 1)	
68	01/07/2006, 02/09/2006	Bob Sinclar & Cutee B feat. Dollarman & Big Ali & Makedah	"Rock This Party (Everybody Dance Now)"	14 (6 and 8)	— New record for most time at no. 1 — First artist to have three songs reach no. 1 (Bob Sinclar) — The most-played song of 2007
	12/08/2006	No charts (3 weeks)			
69	28/10/2006	Starting Rock feat. Diva Avari	"Don't Go"	1	
70	04/11/2006	Fedde Le Grand	"Put Your Hands Up For Detroit"	8	
	23/12/2006	No charts (3 weeks)			
71	13/01/2007, 17/02/2007	Eric Prydz vs Floyd	"Proper Education"	4 (3 and 1)	
72	03/02/2007, 24/02/2007	Enur feat. Natasja	"Calabria 2007"	3 (2 and 1)	
73	03/03/2007	Alex Gaudino feat. Crystal Waters	"Destination Calabria"	5	
74	07/04/2007	Bob Sinclar & Cutee B feat. Gary Pine & Dollarman	"Sound of Freedom"	13	— First artist to have four songs reach no. 1 (Bob Sinclar)
75	07/07/2007, 25/08/2007	David Guetta & Chris Willis	"Love Is Gone"	5 (4 and 1)	
	04/08/2007	No charts (3 weeks)			
76	01/09/2007	Bob Sinclar presents Fireball	"What I Want"	5	— First artist to have five songs reach no. 1 (Bob Sinclar)
77	06/10/2007	Rihanna	"Don't Stop The Music"	10	
78	15/12/2007, 05/01/2008	Mondotek	"Alive!"	7 (1 and 6)	
	22/12/2007	No charts (2 weeks)			
79	16/02/2008, 08/03/2008	Laurent Wolf feat. Eric Carter	"No Stress"	9 (2 and 7)	— The most-played song of 2008
80	01/03/2008	Pitbull feat. Lil Jon	"The Anthem"	1	
81	26/04/2008	Magic System	"Zouglou Dance (Joie de vivre)"	15	— Record for most time at no. 1
	09/08/2008	No charts (3 weeks)			
82	30/08/2008	Laurent Wolf feat. Eric Carter	"Wash My World"	1	
83	06/09/2008, 15/11/2008	Kylian Mash & Laurent Konrad present Discobitch	"C'est Beau La Bourgeoisie"	11 (9 and 2)	
84	08/11/2008, 29/11/2008, 10/01/2009	Guru Josh Project	"Infinity 2008"	7 (1, 4 and 2)	
	27/12/2008	No charts (2 weeks)			
85	24/01/2009	Big Ali feat. Dollarman	"Hit The Floor"	2	
86	07/02/2009	Lady Gaga	"Poker Face"	2	
87	21/02/2009, 21/03/2009, 02/05/2009	Jessy Matador aka La Selesao	"Mini Kawoulé"	3 (1, 1 and 1)	— The most-played song of 2009
88	28/02/2009, 28/03/2009, 09/05/2009	Magic System & Khaled	"Même pas fatigué"	8 (3, 3 and 2)	
89	18/04/2009	Kid Cudi vs. Crookers	"Day 'n' Nite"	1	
90	25/04/2009	Flo Rida feat. Ke$ha	"Right Round"	1	
91	23/05/2009, 06/06/2009, 20/06/2009, 01/08/2009	Collectif Métissé	"Laisse toi aller Bébé"	4 (1, 1, 1 and 1)	— First song to reach no. 1 four separate times
92	30/05/2009	Helmut Fritz	"Ça m'énerve"	1	
93	13/06/2009, 27/06/2009	Pitbull	"I Know You Want Me (Calle Ocho)"	6 (1 and 5)	
	04/08/2009	No charts (3 weeks)			
94	29/08/2009, 24/10/2009	David Guetta feat. Akon	"Sexy Bitch"	11 (7 and 4)	
95	17/10/2009, 21/11/2009	Pitbull	"Hotel Room Service"	3 (1 and 2)	
96	05/12/2009, 09/01/2010	Edward Maya & Vika Jigulina	"Stereo Love"	11 (3 and 8)	
	26/12/2009	No charts (2 weeks)			

== 2010s ==
N°	Date	Artist	Title	Number of weeks at no. 1	Notes
97	06/03/2010, 27/03/2010, 01/05/2010	Stromae	"Alors on danse"	8 (1, 4 and 3)	
98	13/03/2010	Ke$ha	"Tik Tok"	1	
99	20/03/2010, 24/04/2010	Lucenzo feat. Big Ali	"Vem Dançar Kuduro"	2 (1 and 1)	— The most-played song of 2010
100	22/05/2010, 26/06/2010, 24/07/2010	David Guetta & Chris Willis feat. Fergie & LMFAO	"Gettin' Over You"	4 (1, 2 and 1)	
101	29/05/2010	Remady P&R	"No Superstar"	1	
102	05/06/2010, 10/07/2010	Klaas	"Our Own Way"	4 (3 and 1)	
103	17/07/2010	Collectif Métissé	"Debout pour danser"	1	
104	31/07/2010	Jessy Matador	"Allez Ola Olé"	1	
	07/08/2010	No charts (3 weeks)			
105	28/08/2010, 09/10/2010, 23/10/2010	Yolanda Be Cool & DCUP	"We No Speak Americano"	7 (5, 1 and 1)	
106	02/10/2010, 13/11/2010	Mohombi	"Bumpy Ride"	2 (1 and 1)	
107	16/10/2010, 06/11/2010	Swedish House Mafia feat. Pharrell	"One (Your Name)"	2 (1 and 1)	
108	30/10/2010	Taio Cruz	"Dynamite"	1	
109	20/11/2010	Duck Sauce	"Barbra Streisand"	2	
110	04/12/2010, 08/01/2011, 22/01/2011, 12/02/2011	The Black Eyed Peas	"The Time (Dirty Bit)"	8 (3, 1, 2 and 2)	
	25/12/2010	No charts (2 weeks)			
111	15/01/2011, 05/02/2011, 26/02/2011, 12/03/2011	Magic System	"Ambiance à l'africaine"	4 (1, 1, 1 and 1)	
112	05/03/2011, 26/03/2011, 16/04/2011	Alexandra Stan	"Mr. Saxobeat"	3 (1, 1 and 1)	
113	19/03/2011, 02/04/2011	Inna	"Sun Is Up"	2 (1 and 1)	
114	09/04/2011, 30/04/2011, 04/06/2011	Magic System & Soprano	"Chérie coco"	3 (1, 1 and 1)	— First artist to have six songs reach no. 1 (Magic System)
115	23/04/2011, 07/05/2011	Snoop Dogg vs. David Guetta	"Sweat"	2 (1 and 1)	
116	14/05/2011, 02/07/2011, 30/07/2011	LMFAO feat. Lauren Bennett & GoonRock	"Party Rock Anthem"	7 (3, 3 and 1)	
117	11/06/2011	The Black Eyed Peas	"Don't Stop the Party"	1	
118	18/06/2011, 27/08/2011	DJ Antoine vs. Timati feat. Kalenna	"Welcome to St. Tropez"	3 (2 and 1)	
119	23/07/2011	Collectif Métissé	"Laisse tomber tes problèmes"	1	
	06/08/2011	No charts (3 weeks)			
120	03/09/2011	Inna feat. Flo Rida	"Club Rocker"	1	
121	10/09/2011	G-Nose & Nélinho feat. Papi Sánchez	"Pop Pop Kuduro (Yeah baby)"	2	
122	24/09/2011	Keen'V	"Prince charmant"	1	
123	01/10/2011, 19/11/2011	Don Omar & Lucenzo	"Danza Kuduro"	6 (5 and 1)	— The most-played song of 2011
124	05/11/2011, 26/11/2011, 07/01/2012	LMFAO	"Sexy and I Know It"	9 (2, 4 and 3)	
	24/12/2011	No charts (2 weeks)			
125	28/01/2012, 24/03/2012	Michel Teló	"Ai Se Eu Te Pego"	12 (7 and 5)	— The most-played song of 2012
126	17/03/2012	Keen'V	"Les Mots"	1	
127	28/04/2012, 16/06/2012, 07/07/2012	Gusttavo Lima	"Balada"	4 (1, 1 and 2)	
128	05/05/2012, 23/06/2012	DJ Antoine feat. The Beat Shakers	"Ma chérie 2k12"	8 (6 and 2)	
129	21/07/2012	Matt Houston feat. P-Square	"Positif"	1	
130	28/07/2012	Kid Cudi feat. MGMT & Ratatat	"Pursuit of Happiness"	1	
	04/08/2012	No charts (3 weeks)			
131	25/08/2012	Alex Ferrari	"Bara Bará Bere Berê"	8	
132	20/10/2012, 03/11/2012, 24/11/2012	Psy	"Gangnam Style"	6 (1, 2 and 3)	
133	27/10/2012	R.I.O. feat. Nicco	"Party Shaker"	1	
134	17/11/2012, 15/12/2012, 05/01/2013	Keen'V	"Elle t'a maté (Fatoumata)"	7 (1, 1 and 5)	
	22/12/2012	No charts (2 weeks)			
135	09/02/2013, 16/03/2013, 04/05/2013	Bingo Players feat. Far East Movement	"Get Up (Rattle)"	10 (4, 5 and 1)	— The most-played song of 2013
136	09/03/2013	Big Ali feat. Wati B	"WatiBigali"	1	
137	20/04/2013, 11/05/2013	Lumidee vs. Fatman Scoop	"Dance! 2013"	2 (1 and 1)	
138	27/04/2013, 18/05/2013	David Guetta feat. Ne-Yo & Akon	"Play Hard"	2 (1 and 1)	
139	25/05/2013	Major Lazer feat. Busy Signal & The Flexican & FS Green	"Watch Out For This (Bumaye)"	9	— The most-played song of 2014
140	26/07/2013, 12/10/2013	Lucenzo & Kenza Farah	"Obsesión"	2 (1 and 1)	
	03/08/2013	No charts (3 weeks)			
141	24/08/2013	DJ Assad feat. Alain Ramanisum & Willy William	"Li tourner 2013"	5	
142	28/09/2013, 02/11/2013, 16/11/2013	Martin Garrix	"Animals"	5 (2, 2 and 1)	
143	19/10/2013	Tapo & Raya	"Quitate el top"	2	
144	09/11/2013, 30/11/2013	DVBBS & Borgeous	"Tsunami"	2 (1 and 1)	
145	07/12/2013, 04/01/2014	Vitaa feat. Maître Gims	"Game Over"	2 (1 and 1)	
146	14/12/2013, 11/01/2014, 01/03/2014	DJ Assad & Papi Sánchez & Luyanna	"Enamórame (Oui bébé)"	3 (1, 1 and 1)	
	21/12/2013	No charts (2 weeks)			
147	18/01/2014	Jason Derulo feat. 2 Chainz	"Talk Dirty"	1	
148	25/02/2014, 08/02/2014, 08/03/2014	New World Sound & Thomas Newson	"Flute"	5 (1, 3 and 1)	
149	01/02/2014	Ahzee	"Born Again"	1	
150	15/03/2014, 05/04/2014	Major Lazer feat. Sean Paul	"Come On to Me"	3 (2 and 1)	
151	29/03/2014, 12/04/2014	Rebel feat. Sidney Housen	"Black Pearl (He's a Pirate)"	2 (1 and 1)	
152	19/04/2014, 17/05/2014, 14/06/2014	Magic System feat. Ahmed Chawki	"Magic in the Air"	6 (2, 1 and 3)	— First artist to have seven songs reach no. 1 (Magic System) — Record for the number of no. 1s by the same artist (7 by Magic System)
153	03/05/2014, 24/05/2014, 05/07/2014	Lee Mashup feat. Stone Warley & Co	"Hum Connection"	7 (2, 3 and 2)	
154	19/07/2014, 20/09/2014, 04/10/2014, 25/10/2014	Keen'V	"Dis-moi oui (Marina)"	4 (1, 1, 1 and 1)	
155	26/07/2014, 23/08/2014	DJ Assad feat. Denis Azor & Mario Ramsamy & Willy William	"Alalila (Le Séga)"	5 (1 and 4)	
	02/08/2014	No charts (3 weeks)			
156	27/09/2014, 01/11/2014	Lee Mashup feat. Stone Warley & Co	"Au Top du Top"	2 (1 and 1)	
157	11/10/2014	DJ Hamida feat. Lartiste & Rim'K & Kayna Samet	"Déconnectés"	2	
158	08/11/2014, 06/12/2014, 10/01/2015	Soprano	"Cosmo"	5 (3, 1 and 1)	
159	29/11/2014, 07/02/2015	Timmy Trumpet & Savage	"Freaks"	2 (1 and 1)	
160	13/12/2014, 17/01/2015	Kendji Girac	"Andalouse"	3 (1 and 2)	
	20/12/2014	No charts (3 weeks)			
161	31/01/2015, 14/03/2015	Mark Ronson feat. Bruno Mars	"Uptown Funk"	5 (1 and 4)	
162	14/02/2015	Soprano feat. Uncle Phil	"Fresh Prince"	4	
163	11/04/2015	Makassy	"Doucement 2015"	1	
164	18/04/2015, 30/05/2015, 04/07/2015	Major Lazer & DJ Snake feat. MØ	"Lean On"	7 (2, 4 and 1)	— The most-played song of 2015
165	02/05/2015, 27/06/2015	OMI	"Cheerleader"	5 (4 and 1)	
166	11/07/2015, 29/08/2015, 19/09/2015	Eva Simons feat. Konshens	"Policeman"	5 (1, 2 and 2)	
167	18/07/2015	Collectif Métissé	"Rendez vous au Soleil"	1	
168	28/07/2015, 19/09/2015	Willy William	"Te quiero"	2 (1 and 1)	
	01/08/2015	No charts (4 weeks)			
169	03/10/2015, 21/11/2015	Nicky Jam & Enrique Iglesias	"El Perdón"	7 (6 and 1)	
170	14/11/2015	Kendji Girac	"Me Quemo"	1	
171	29/11/2015	Keen'V	"Un monde meilleur"	1	
172	05/12/2015, 23/01/2016	Willy William	"Ego"	6 (3 and 3)	— The most-played song of 2016
	26/12/2015	No charts (2 weeks)			
173	09/01/2016, 13/02/2016	Ridsa	"Là c'est die"	5 (2 and 3)	
174	05/03/2016, 09/04/2016	Major Lazer feat. Nyla & Fuse ODG	"Light It Up"	4 (3 and 1)	
175	26/03/2016, 16/04/2016, 28/05/2016	Willy William feat. Keen'V	"On s'endort"	6 (2, 3 and 1)	
176	07/05/2016	MHD	"Afro Trap Part 5 (Ngatie Abedi)"	1	
177	14/05/2016, 04/06/2016, 27/08/2016	Deorro feat. Elvis Crespo	"Bailar"	12 (2, 10 and 2)	
	30/07/2016	No charts (4 weeks)			
178	10/09/2016, 05/11/2016	Zaho feat. MHD	"Laissez les Kouma"	8 (7 and 1)	
179	29/10/2016, 12/11/2016	Alonzo	"Binta"	3 (1 and 2)	
180	26/11/2016	MHD	"A Kele N'ta"	3	
181	17/12/2016, 21/01/2017	Collectif Métissé	"Makala"	2 (1 and 1)	
	24/12/2016	No charts (2 weeks)			
182	07/01/2017	Sound Of Legend	"Blue (Da Ba Dee)"	1	
183	14/01/2017	Niska feat. Maître Gims	"Elle avait son djo"	1	
184	28/01/2017	MHD	"Afro Trap Part 7 (La Puissance)"	1	— Record: fourth no. 1 in less than a year by the same artist (MHD)
185	04/02/2017, 22/04/2017	Keblack	"Bazardée"	12 (10 and 2)	
186	15/04/2017	Ed Sheeran	"Shape of You"	1	
187	06/05/2017, 26/05/2017, 10/06/2017	Luis Fonsi feat. Daddy Yankee	"Despacito"	4 (2, 1 and 1)	— The most-played song of 2017
188	20/05/2017, 03/06/2017, 17/06/2017	Lartiste feat. Awa Imani	"Chocolat"	4 (1, 1 and 2)	
189	01/07/2017, 26/08/2017	Tydiaz	"Claro de Luna"	3 (2 and 1)	
190	15/07/2017, 02/09/2017, 04/11/2017, 18/11/2017	J Balvin & Willy William	"Mi Gente"	11 (1, 8, 1, and 1)	
191	22/07/2017	Collectif Métissé	"Gimme Hope Jo'anna"	1	
	29/07/2017	No charts (4 weeks)			
192	28/10/2017, 11/11/2017, 02/12/2017	DJ Sem feat. Marwa Loud	"Mi corazón"	5 (1, 1 and 3)	
193	25/11/2017	Collectif Métissé	"Reggae Night"	1	
	23/12/2017	No charts (2 weeks)			
194	06/01/2018, 10/02/2018	Lartiste	"Catchu Catchu"	3 (2 and 1)	
195	20/01/2018	Collectif Métissé feat. Joniece Jamison	"Sweet Dreams"	1	
196	27/01/2018	Luis Fonsi & Demi Lovato	"Échame la Culpa"	1	
197	03/02/2018; 24/02/2018	Jahyanai King feat. Bamby	"Who Mad Again"	2 (1 and 1)	
198	17/02/2018, 03/03/2018, 07/04/2018	MC Fioti & Future & J Balvin & Stefflon Don & Juan Magán	"Bum Bum Tam Tam"	6 (1, 3 and 2)	
199	24/03/2018	DJ Somax	"I Like to Move It"	1	
200	21/04/2018	Marwa Loud	"Fallait pas"	1	
201	21/04/2018	Nelkita	"Dembow Papa"	1	
202	28/04/2018, 12/05/2018	Kore & L'Algérino	"Va Bene"	8 (1 and 7)	
203	05/05/2018	El Chombo feat. Cutty Ranks	"Dame Tu Cosita"	1	
204	23/06/2018, 07/07/2018, 01/09/2018	Aya Nakamura	"Djadja"	5 (1, 3 and 2)	
205	30/06/2018	El Profesor	"Bella ciao"	1	
206	28/07/2018	Kaïzer Panda feat. Kelyan Muller	"Hum"	1	
	04/08/2018	No charts (4 weeks)			
207	15/09/2018	Collectif Métissé	"Ven Ven Ven"	1	— Record for the number of no. 1s by the same artist (9 by Collectif Métissé)
208	22/09/2018, 06/10/2018, 27/11/2018	Vegedream	"Ramenez la coupe à la maison"	5 (1, 2 and 2)	
209	29/09/2018, 15/12/2018	Aya Nakamura	"Copines"	2 (1 and 1)	
210	20/10/2018, 10/11/2018, 01/12/2018	DJ Snake feat. Selena Gomez & Cardi B & Ozuna	"Taki Taki"	3 (1, 1 and 1)	
211	17/11/2018	Laurent H	"Are you ready"	1	
212	24/11/2018, 08/12/2018	The Prince Karma	"Later bitches"	2 (1 and 1)	
