= Mi Corazón (song) =

Song by DJ Sem and Marwa Loud

Single by DJ Sem featuring Marwa Loud
- Released: 28 June 2017
- Genre: French pop
- Length: 3:01
- Songwriters: DJ Sem; Marwa Loud

DJ Sem singles chronology
"Libre comme l'air" (2017)	"Mi Corazon" (2017)	"La Roulette" (2018)

Marwa Loud singles chronology
"Mehdi" (2017)	"Mi Corazon" (2017)	"Fallait pas" (2018)

Music video
- Mi Corazón on YouTube

"Mi Corazón" is a song by the Algerian DJ DJ Sem and features vocals by French singer Marwa Loud.

== Music video ==
"Mi Corazon" was released on June 28, 2017, on YouTube. As of April 2021, it has 223 million views.

== Charts ==
Chart (2017–18)	Peak position
Belgium (Ultratop 50 Wallonia)	28
France (SNEP)	20

== Certifications ==
Region	Certification	Certified units/sales
France (SNEP)	Platinum	133,333^{‡}
^{‡} Sales+streaming figures based on certification alone.
