= Philippe Grosclaude =

Swiss painter (born 1942)

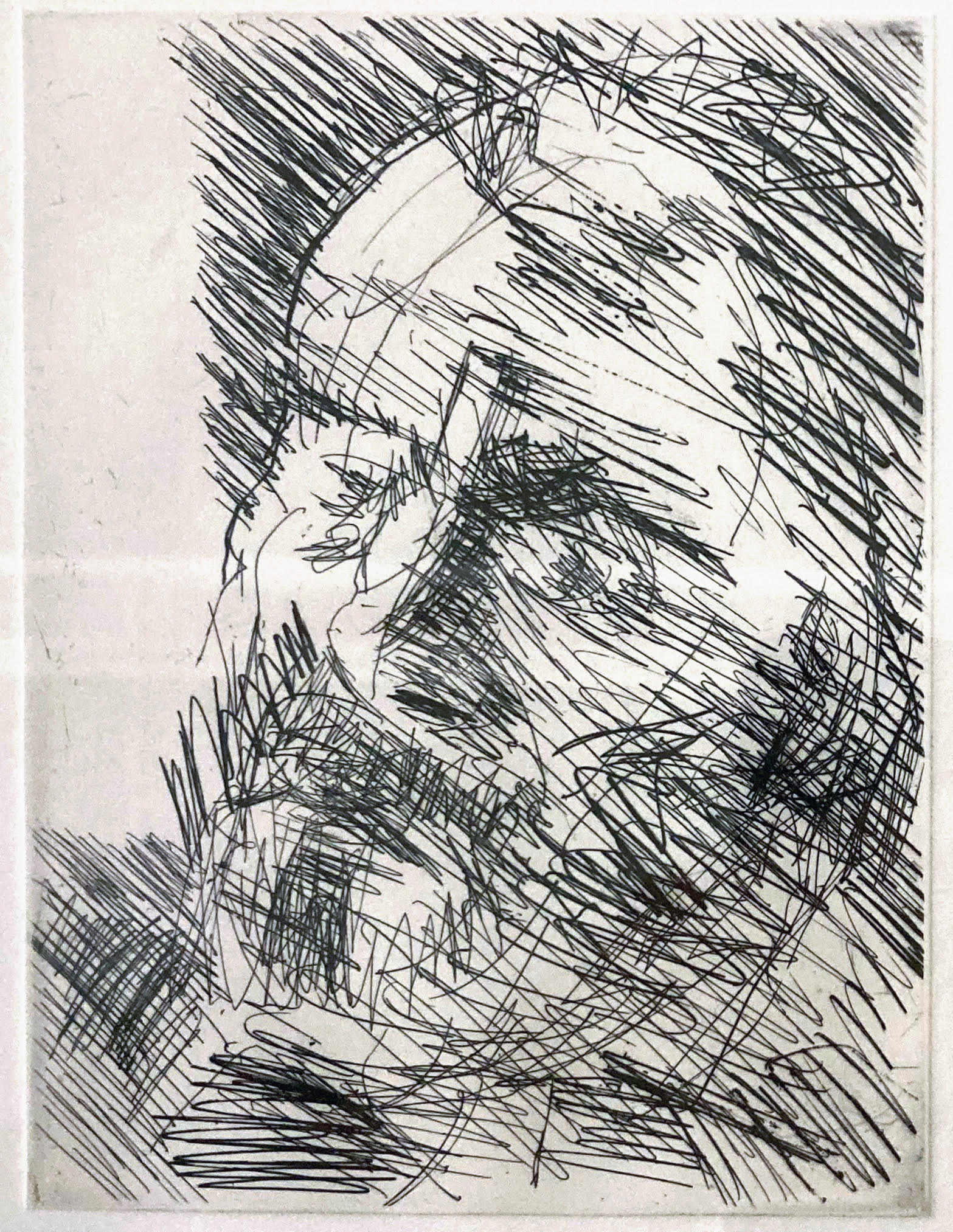
Philippe Grosclaude, par Henri Presset (1985)

Philippe Grosclaude (born 1942) is a painter who lives and works in his native Geneva. After practicing oil and acrylic painting, he adopted pastel, which he has made central to his output since the 1980s.

His art has been singled out for several awards over the years, including the Prix Boris Oumansky in 1977 and on three occasions the Swiss Bourse fédérale des Beaux-Arts (in 1965, 1968, and 1981).

== Life and work ==
Philippe Grosclaude took an early interest in drawing, practicing the medium as a child. In 1958, he decided to enroll at the École des Beaux-Arts de Genève, where he studied art until 1963. This decision amounted to a break with his milieu. At the fine-arts school in Geneva he met the artist and writer Thérèse Houyoux (Brussels, 1940 – Geneva, 2011), who was to become his wife.

In the 1960s, his painting was figurative, incorporating human and animal figures and recognizable objects within an abstract space. This mix of geometrical and symbolic elements can be found throughout his body of work.

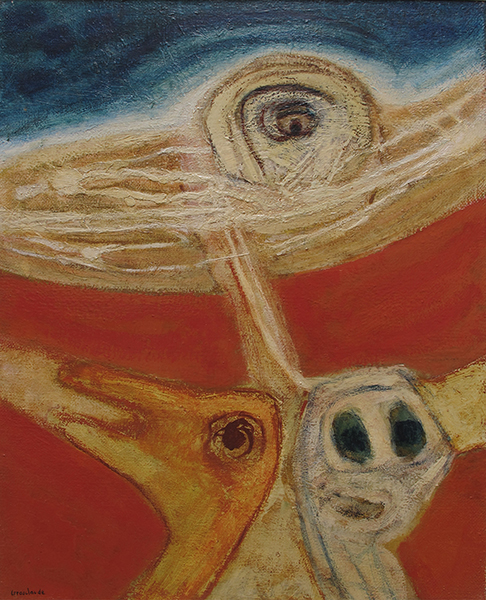
Philippe Grosclaude, L oeil universel, env 1969

In 1970, Grosclaude abandoned oil painting for acrylic. At this time he began to develop another palette of colors in which sharper more vibrant tones are used side by side. During the same decade, he also adopted chalk, charcoal, and pastel, which allowed him greater freedom thanks to their immediacy. He also took up drawing again, reappropriating and subverting its codes by superimposing layer over layer to intensify the color and lend it the desired depth and transparency. His palette now returned to earth tones, ochers, charcoal grays, and shades of white and black.

Format has also played an important role in his art. The scale of his pictures became increasingly large in the late 1980s, eventually reaching the full-length format. These new dimensions offered the chance to engage in a more direct confrontation with and through paint, a confrontation that Grosclaude likens to combat and its violence.

Along with his output in painting, Grosclaude developed a body of work in monotypes and printing on glass and Plexiglas – techniques that involve a certain amount of chance.

Philippe Grosclaude's work has been featured in a number of solo shows in Switzerland, notably in Geneva, Basel, Zurich, Delémont, and Le Locle, and has been seen in group exhibitions in Paris, Tel Aviv, Athens, Ulm, and Brussels. Pieces by Grosclaude are part of the collections of a number of institutions in Switzerland, the Musée d’art et d’histoire and the Cabinet des arts graphiques, both in Geneva; the Cabinet cantonal des estampes at the Musée Jenisch in Vevey; and the Teo Jakob Foundation in Bern.

== Technique and composition ==
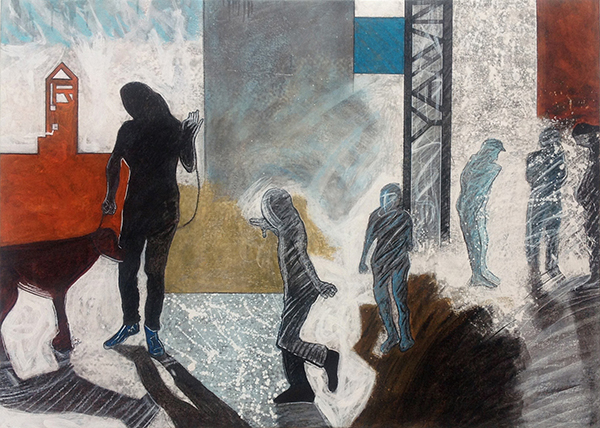
Philippe Grosclaude, 2019 03 Sans titre

Pastel became Grosclaude's principal medium in the 1980s after he discovered the writings of Francis Bacon (Dublin, 1909 - Madrid, 1992). Working alternately in soft pastel and oil pastel, Grosclaude has used the medium to free himself from the constraints imposed by the process of drying and the change to the picture surface that drying entails. Experimenting with the effects of light, Grosclaude works in succeeding layers of pigment, which he covers with a spray-applied coat of matte varnish. Each inch of the pictorial space is thus covered many times.

He works empirically, each picture serving as a study for the next, and doesn't make use of preparatory drawings or sketches. Grosclaude compares his work to that of the craftsman, artistic work that is elaborated over time in which each part of the canvas has to be perfectly mastered. Through a repeated gesture that plays out in either sprays, lines or different structures, he creates sequences that are akin to geological strata or tree rings, thus lending a temporal dimension to his output, as the critic Laurent Wolf puts it.

== Themes ==
Philippe Grosclaude works according to a long timeline. That is, time and the artistic process transform an initial idea that isn't completely defined and may be inspired by themes that are seen or felt as he works, themes that may be linked with current events as well.

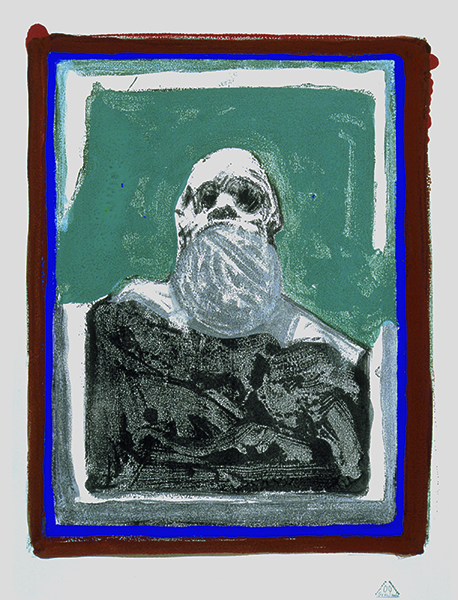
Philippe Grosclaude, 2000 Face15

The human figure can be seen throughout his body of work, e.g., masks, stern and occasionally howling faces, human shapes that are treated as archetypes. An expression of otherness, these figures aren't portraits but symbols of human beings and their condition. The many symbols surrounding them – stars and arrows in particular – likewise convey a generic meaning.

Since the early 2000s, he has explored structured space. This was initially industrial, in which the human presence is suggested indirectly or analogously. Such spaces include factories, cathedrals, dwellings, great and grand places that boast crowds and welcome multitudes. They conjure up the presence of humans or their absence, solitude, and the feeling of being left behind. In the late 2010s, architecture became more urban. It is often depicted being crossed by figures seemingly on the move, in transit – simple passers-by or demonstrators.

Street art, graffiti in particular, is also a source of inspiration for Grosclaude, who sees in it great freedom of expression and formal innovation.

At the heart of his painting are several existential questions. His questioning about humans, what they do, what they experience in living, who they are – this lies at the root of the painter's work and spurs an endless search.

== Solo and group shows (selection) ==
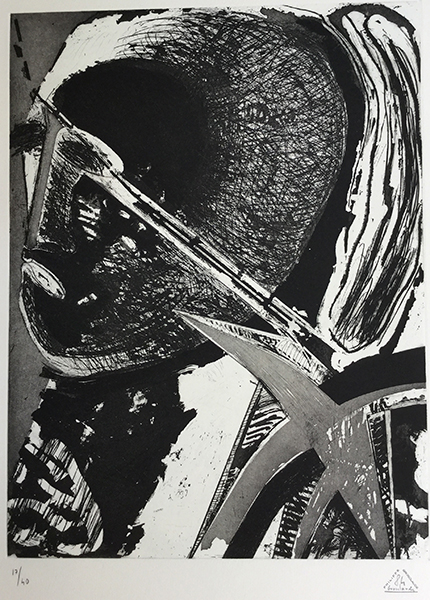
Philippe Grosclaude, 1984 L homme traverse haldas4

- Philippe Grosclaude - Peinture en trois temps, Galerie Boléro, Centre d'art Versoix, 2024
- Philippe Grosclaude, Centre d'art ARTsenal, Delémont, 2021.
- Philippe Grosclaude, peintures - pastels, Musée des beaux-arts du Locle, Le Locle, 2002.
- Philippe Grosclaude - Bilder, Graf & Schelble Galerie, 1995.
- Philippe Grosclaude, Peintures et travaux récents s/papier, Galerie Anton Meier, Genève, 1994.
- Philippe Grosclaude, Galerie Arteba, Zurich, 1994.
- Philippe Grosclaude, Hôtel-de-Ville [Centre d'art contemporain], Yverdon-les-Bains, 1990.
- Philippe Grosclaude - Bilder des Jahres 1986, Galerie Jörg Stummer, Zurich, 1986.
- Le dessin suisse 1970-1980 / Schweizer Zeichnungen 1970-1980, Pro Helvetia/Musée Rath, Genève, Tel-Aviv, Athènes, Ulm, Bruxelles, Toulon, Coire, Aarau, 1981-1982.
- Artistes de Genève 1980 - 1: La peinture, Musée Rath, Genève, 1979-1980.
- Grosclaude - Prix Boris Oumansky 1977, Société des arts de Genève, Genève, 1977.
- Philippe Grosclaude, Galerie Rivolta, Lausanne, 1977.
- Artistes de Genève, Musée Rath, Genève, 1972.
- 6e Biennale internationale des Jeunes Artistes, Musée d'art moderne de la Ville de Paris, Paris, 1969
