= 2024–25 Coupe de France preliminary rounds, Brittany =

The 2024–25 Coupe de France preliminary rounds, Brittany was the qualifying competition to decide which teams from the leagues of the Brittany region of France took part in the main competition from the seventh round.

A total of fifteen teams qualified from the Brittany preliminary rounds.

In 2023–24, Dinan Léhon FC, progressed furthest in the main competition, reaching the round of 64, before losing to Ligue 1 side Stade de Reims.

== Draws and fixtures ==
On 25 June 2024, the league announced that 672 teams from the region had entered the competition. The draw for the first round, with 246 ties, was published on 16 August 2024. The 194 ties of the second round were published on 29 August 2024. The third round draw, which saw the teams from Régional 1 and Championnat National 3 enter the competition, was published on 12 September 2024, with 114 ties drawn. The fourth round draw, featuring the clubs from Championnat National 2, consisted of 59 ties and was published on 18 September 2024. The fifth round draw, featuring the single team in the region from Championnat National, was published on 2 October 2024, with 30 ties drawn. The fifteen ties of the sixth round were published on 16 October 2024.

=== First round ===
These matches were played on 24 and 25 August 2024.

First round results: Brittany
Tie no	Home team (tier)	Score	Away team (tier)
1.	ES Visseiche Arbrissel (11)	0–1	US Acigné (10)
2.	Cercle Paul Bert Nord Ouest (12)	0–10	AS Saint-Jacques (10)
3.	AS Baye La Morena (11)	3–0	Locunolé Sports (10)
4.	Espoir Saint-Jacut-les-Pins (10)	1–2	Les Fougerêts-Saint-Martin-sur-Oust (10)
5.	OC Beignon (9)	1–6	Elan Montertelot (10)
6.	Stade Hennebontais (9)	3–0 (Note: Tie won by means of forfeit.)	AS Plouharnel (10)
7.	AS Guermeur (8)	3–0	Caudan SF (9)
8.	Garde de l'Yvel Loyat (11)	0–5	Avenir Saint-Servant-sur-Oust (9)
9.	AS Croix-Helléan (9)	1–1 (5–6 p)	Garde de Mi-Voie Guillac (10)
10.	AS Saint-Barthélemy (11)	0–11	FC Klegereg (9)
11.	ES Ségliennaise (11)	1–14	FC Meslan (10)
12.	ES Langonnet (11)	1–3	Étoile de l'Inam (11)
13.	US Saint-Gilles (9)	1–4	SEP Quédillac (8)
14.	US Bédée-Pleumeleuc (9)	3–4	Espérance de Rennes (9)
15.	Torcé-Vergéal FC (10)	3–1	US Billé-Javené (9)
16.	RC Plesder (10)	0–3	JA Saint-Servan (9)
17.	Ar'Goliath FC (10)	0–7	FC Pen Hir Camaret (9)
18.	OC Brétillien (10)	1–1 (5–3 p)	Stade Saint-Aubinais (8)
19.	Stade Plouërais (12)	0–7	US Yvignac-la-Tour (9)
20.	Rance FC (10)	1–2	Stade Évrannais (9)
21.	US Kergristoise (11)	0–4	Plounévez-Lanrivain-Trémargat US (9)
22.	Saint-Brieuc Football Ouest (9)	2–0	CS Croix Lambert (10)
23.	US Callac (10)	2–0	US Plougonver (11)
24.	FC Lantic (10)	0–0 (4–5 p)	AS Grâces (10)
25.	US Méné Bré Louargat (9)	3–1	AS Ploumilliau (10)
26.	Saint-Pierre Ploudiry-La Martyre (11)	0–2	Haut-Léon FC (9)
27.	US Garlan (11)	0–5	Avenir Plourin (10)
28.	Avel Vor Saint-Pabu (10)	1–2	AS Landeda (9)
29.	FC Côte des Légendes (10)	1–3	Étoile Saint-Yves Ploudaniel (9)
30.	ÉS Plonéis (10)	1–8	Gourlizon Sport (9)
31.	Racing Cast-Porzay (10)	3–1	Paotred Briec (9)
32.	US Médréac (10)	3–3 (5–6 p)	Breizh Fobal Klub (10)
33.	ÉS Névez (10)	0–0 (7–6 p)	FC Rosporden (9)
34.	US Clohars-Carnoët (10)	0–2	Stade Mellacois (9)
35.	AS La Claie (10)	0–4	US Saint-Abraham Chapelle-Caro (9)
36.	CS Saint-Gaudence Allaire (9)	9–0	JA Pleucadeuc (10)
37.	Avenir Campénéac Augan (9)	3–1	Ecureils Roc-Saint-André (9)
38.	Ajoncs d'Or Malguénac (9)	4–0	ACS Bieuzy-les-Eaux (10)
39.	AS Calanaise (9)	6–2	AS Priziac (10)
40.	ASC Kernascléden Lignol (11)	1–4	Avenir Guiscriff (9)
41.	AS Ercé-près-Liffré (9)	1–3	AS Chantepie (8)
42.	Domloup Sport (10)	0–3	Stade Louvignéen (9)
43.	FC Haute Bretagne Romantique (11)	0–3	FC La Chapelle-Montgermont (9)
44.	FC Marcillé Bazouges Saint-Rémy Noyal (11)	0–3 (Note: Tie reversed from original draw.)	FC Bord de Rance (9)
45.	La Seiche FC (10)	1–3	Hermine La Noë Blanche (10)
46.	US Châteauneuf-du-Faou (11)	3–0	AS Gâs de Leuhan (10)
47.	US Calorguen (12)	0–5	RC Dinan (9)
48.	FC L'Hermitage Lorge (10)	1–5	CS Lanrelas (9)
49.	US Frémur-Fresnaye (10)	2–2 (3–2 p)	UF Yffiniac (11)
50.	Trieux FC (11)	0–1	ES Pestivien (10)
51.	AS Pabu Plein Air (9)	4–0	SC Trédarzec (10)
52.	Méné Bré Sports Pédernec (10)	1–0	FC Trélévern-Trévou (11)
53.	US Pluzunet-Tonquédec (11)	0–0 (6–7 p)	Stade Kénanais (10)
54.	US Lanmeur-Plouégat-Guérand (10)	2–2 (1–3 p)	Étoile Trégoroise Plougasnou (9)
55.	Étoile Saint-Arzel (10)	1–4	Arzelliz Ploudalmézeau (9)
56.	FC Lanhouarneau-Plounévez-Lochrist (10)	2–2 (8–7 p)	Hermine Kernilis (10)
57.	AS Kersaint (10)	2–3	Stade Landernéen Kergrèis (9)
58.	La Raquette Tréméoc (11)	0–3	ES Mahalon-Confort (9)
59.	FC Treffiagat-Guilvinec (10)	0–3	FC Odet (9)
60.	SS Saint-Goazec (11)	3–5	Toros Plounévézel (10)
61.	AS Saint-Pôtan (11)	0–3	FC Plélan Vildé Corseul (9)
62.	US Querrien (11)	0–2	ES Rédené (10)
63.	Bleuets Néant-sur-Yvel (10)	7–1	Enfants de Saint-Gildas (10)
64.	Erdeven-Étel Foot (10)	0–1	Riantec OC (9)
65.	Garde Saint-Eloi Kerfourn (9)	6–0	FC Gueltas Saint-Gérand Saint-Gonnery (10)
66.	FC Billio (11)	0–15	ES Colpo (9)
67.	Plumelin Sports (10)	1–2	EFC Saint-Jean-Brévelay (9)
68.	JA Arzano (9)	4–1	FC Kerchopine (9)
69.	FL Inguiniel (9)	4–1	Stade Guémenois (9)
70.	US Orgères (9)	1–3	Cercle Paul Bert Gayeulles (9)
71.	La Mélorienne (10)	1–1 (6–7 p)	US Baguer-Morvan (9)
72.	US Saint-Méen-Saint-Onen (10)	2–5	US Gaël Muel (9)
73.	US Noyal-Chatillon (8)	3–0	US Vern-sur-Seiche (9)
74.	FC Grand-Fougeray Sainte-Anne (10)	0–6	US Bel Air (9)
75.	Jeunesse Combourgeoise (10)	0–3	CS La Richardais (10)
76.	FC Pleuvennois (9)	0–2	CA Forestois (8)
77.	ES Saint-Cast-le-Guildo (10)	14–0	ASC La Landec (11)
78.	La Ploeucoise Foot (9)	1–0	Association Trévé Sports (10)
79.	Mené FC (10)	1–4	ÉS La Madelene Saint-Guen (12)
80.	AS Plélo (9)	3–1	AS Pleubian-Pleumeur (9)
81.	US Plouisy (9)	0–0 (5–6 p)	ES Frout Saint-Agathon (10)
82.	US Ploubezre (10)	0–0 (2–4 p)	CS Trégastel (9)
83.	Breizh Olympique Caouënnec-Lanvézéac (12)	1–2	US Pays Rochois et Langoatais (10)
84.	AS Scrignac (11)	0–14	ES Berrien-Huelgoat (10)
85.	PL Lambézellec (10)	1–1 (3–4 p)	ASC Mahoraise Brest (9)
86.	ÉS Guissenyenne (10)	2–1	CND Le Folgoët (9)
87.	PL Pilier Rouge (10)	1–3	FA de la Rade (9)
88.	ES Langolen (10)	0–6	Glaziks de Coray (9)
89.	Tricolores Landrévarzec (10)	1–1 (2–4 p)	US Quéménéven (9)
90.	AS Melgven (10)	1–3	US Fouesnant (9)
91.	AS Montreuil-le-Gast (11)	2–3	Cercle Paul Bert Villejean (10)
92.	Coquelicots du Trévoux (10)	0–3	FC Aven-Bélon (9)
93.	Glaneurs de Lizio (10)	0–1	Avenir de Guilliers (10)
94.	Saint-Sébastien Caden (10)	3–3 (3–4 p)	Etincelle Saint-Jean (11)
95.	Bogue D'Or Questembert (9)	1–3	CS Pluneret (9)
96.	ES Mériadec (10)	4–2	ASC Sainte-Anne-d'Auray (10)
97.	AS Moustoir-Ac (9)	2–2 (4–1 p)	Rah-Koëd Plaudren FC (9)
98.	AS Lanester (10)	1–3	Stade Gavrais (11)
99.	ES Surzur (10)	1–2	US Arradon (9)
100.	US Langoëlan-Ploërdut (10)	1–0	AS Bubry (10)
101.	Avenir Domalain (10)	2–1	Haute Vilaine FC (9)
102.	JS Picanaise (10)	2–4	La Cancalaise (8)
103.	AS Tremblay-Chauvigné (10)	0–7	FC Louvigné-La Bazouge (9)
104.	FC Baie du Mont Saint-Michel (10)	3–0	US Sens-de-Bretagne (10)
105.	US Domagné-Saint-Didier (9)	4–1	US Janzé (8)
106.	Gars de Plonévez-du-Faou (10)	8–0	Écureuils de Roudouallec (10)
107.	AS Saint-Malo-de-Phily (10)	2–6	ASC Saint-Erblon (10)
108.	FC Le Hinglé Trévron (10)	0–0 (4–2 p)	US Lanvallay (9)
109.	ÉS Le Fœil (10)	2–1	FC Côte de Penthièvre (9)
110.	Pléhédel Sport (11)	1–1 (4–2 p)	Union Squiffiec-Trégonneau (9)
111.	AS Pyramide Lanfains (11)	0–8	FC Centre Bretagne (9)
112.	US Trieux-Lézardrieux-Pleudaniel (9)	2–2 (3–4 p)	FC Plouagat-Châtelaudren-Lanrodec (9)
113.	US Prat (10)	2–1	US Trémel (11)
114.	ES Douron (10)	0–2	ES Pleyber-Christ (9)
115.	Cadets de Plougoulm (11)	0–5	US Cléder (9)
116.	JG Forestoise (11)	5–1	AS Dirinon (9)
117.	RC Loperhet (10)	0–2	ES Cranou (9)
118.	Combrit Sainte-Marine FC (11)	0–3	Marcassins Sportif Tréogat (9)
119.	AS Gars de Poullan (10)	1–3	AS Diables du Juch (9)
120.	ES Scrignac Poullaouen (10)	1–3	US Cléden-Poher (9)
121.	US Saint-Guinoux (11)	0–8	AS Saint-Pierraise Épiniac (9)
122.	AS Tourc'h (12)	0–10	AS Kernével (10)
123.	US Quimperloise (10)	0–3	AS Tréméven (9)
124.	La Sérentaise (10)	2–3	Indépendante Mauronnaise (8)
125.	Gentienne Pluherlin (10)	1–7	Saint-Clair Limerzel (10)
126.	AS Meucon (9)	2–1	US Albon Lauzach Berric Damgan (9)
127.	ES Remungol (9)	1–2	Saint-Pierre Pleugriffet (10)
128.	US Bieuzy-Lanvaux (10)	0–6	AS Monterblanc (9)
129.	Avenir Plumergat (10)	2–3	Semeurs de Grand-Champ (8)
130.	US Lanvénégen (11)	1–4	US Le Faouët (10)
131.	JA Pipriac (9)	0–2	Espérance Sixt-sur-Aff (8)
132.	Réveil de Lohéac (10)	0–6	FC Mordelles (8)
133.	FC Baulon-Lassy (10)	0–2	Avenir Irodouër (8)
134.	US Dourdain (11)	2–2 (3–4 p)	ÉS Saint-Aubin-des-Landes/EF Cornillé (10)
135.	ES Thorigné-Fouillard (9)	1–5	FC La Mézière-Melesse (8)
136.	AS Saint-Yvi (10)	0–4	Mélénicks Elliant (9)
137.	AS Romillé (10)	0–0 (3–4 p)	FC Hermitage-Chapelle-Cintré (9)
138.	FC Fréhel (11)	3–6	AS Guitté Guenroc (10)
139.	FC Bourseul (10)	0–3	Val d'Arguenon Créhen-Pluduno (9)
140.	ES Pommerit Le Merzer (9)	3–3 (3–4 p)	Goëlands de Plouézec FC (10)
141.	Étoile Sud Armor Porhoët (10)	6–0	US Trémorel (10)
142.	AS Servel-Lannion (9)	6–0	UO Trégor (10)
143.	JA Penvénan (9)	14–0	ES Plougrasienne (10)
144.	FC Plouezoc'h (10)	3–1	US Taulé (9)
145.	La Guerlesquinaise (10)	2–4	US Plouigneau (9)
146.	JS Saint-Thonanaise (10)	2–3	FC Plounéventer Plouédern (9)
147.	Saint-Divy Sports (10)	1–2	US Pencran (9)
148.	Pouldergat Sport (10)	0–1	FC Quimper Penhars (9)
149.	AS Loctudy (11)	0–8	Gars de Plomeur (10)
150.	Edern Sports (10)	3–4	Saint-Thois Sports (10)
151.	Entente Langan La Chapelle-Chaussée Football (11)	1–12	Combourg SC (9)
152.	Fondelienne Carentoir (9)	2–1	FC Saint-Perreux (10)
153.	Caro/Missiriac AS (9)	3–3 (1–4 p)	Chevaliers Saint-Maurice Saint-Guyomard (10)
154.	Gueltas FC (10)	1–1 (5–6 p)	Guénin Sport (8)
155.	AS Saint-Eloi La Vraie-Croix (10)	2–0	US Le Cours (10)
156.	ES Merlevenez (10)	1–1 (4–3 p)	FC Quiberon Saint-Pierre (9)
157.	AS Kergonan (10)	0–9	ES Sud Outre Rade (9)
158.	AS Pluvignoise (9)	10–0	Garde Saint-Arnould Saint-Allouestre (10)
159.	Montagnards Sulniac (8)	2–1	ES Crac'h (9)
160.	FC Pays d'Anast (10)	4–2	US Bain (9)
161.	US Guignen (10)	1–2	AS Cheminots Rennais (9)
162.	USC Chavagne (9)	4–5	FC Aubinois (8)
163.	Entente Sens-Vieux-Vy Gahard (10)	2–4	US Val d'Izé (9)
164.	Essé Le Theil FC (11)	1–4	Olympic Montreuil-Landavran (10)
165.	US Saint-Marc/Saint-Ouen (10)	0–0 (4–5 p)	JA Balazé (8)
166.	US Landeleau (9)	0–3	PB Spézet (8)
167.	US Sainte-Marie (10)	0–11	Avenir Lieuron (8)
168.	AS Trégueux (9)	5–0	AS Plenaltais Plaine-Haute (10)
169.	AS Hillion-Saint-René (9)	0–1	JS Landéhen (10)
170.	Gouessant Foot Coëtmieux-Andel-Morieux-Pommeret (9)	4–0	AS Saint-Hervé (9)
171.	ASC Hippocampe La Chèze (10)	1–2	FC Lié (9)
172.	US Goudelin (9)	4–3	AS Plouha Pludual (10)
173.	Étoile du Leff Boqueho (9)	0–1	FC Le Vieux Bourg (10)
174.	US Saint-Servais-Saint-Derrien (12)	1–2	US Rochoise (10)
175.	AS Saint-Vougay (11)	0–10	ÉF Plougourvest (9)
176.	Association Cavale Blanche Brest (10)	0–0 (5–3 p)	FC Le Relecq-Kerhuon (9)
177.	AS Ploumoguer (11)	0–0 (4–5 p)	SC Lanrivoaré (9)
178.	FC Bigouden (10)	0–10	AS Plomelin (9)
179.	ÉS Saint-Jean-Trolimon (11)	0–3	Plonéour FC (9)
180.	AS Pont-de-Buis (10)	2–0	US Lennon (10)
181.	AS Parthenay-de-Bretagne (11)	0–3	Montfort-Iffendic (9)
182.	La Patriote Malansac (9)	5–0	US Saint-Nicolas avec Tréal (10)
183.	Aurore de Taupont (9)	3–3 (4–3 p)	CS Josselin (8)
184.	AS Kergrist (10)	0–4	SC Sournais (9)
185.	FC Mégalithes (9)	2–0	US Ploeren (10)
186.	La Mélécienne de Plumelec (9)	4–4 (3–1 p)	Cadets de Guéhenno (10)
187.	AL Camors (10)	0–1	Garde du Loch (9)
188.	Hermine Locoal-Mendon (10)	1–5	AS Belle-Île-en-Mer (9)
189.	VFL Keryado Lorient (9)	3–0	Entente Saint-Gilloise (none)
190.	Rives Sportives du Couesnon (9)	0–6	La Vitréenne FC (8)
191.	US Tertre Gris (10)	2–2 (3–5 p)	Cadets Chelun Martigné-Ferchaud (8)
192.	US Gévezé (9)	5–4	US Laillé (9)
193.	UFC Aron (11)	1–3	Hermine de Renac (10)
194.	AS Livré/Mecé (10)	3–3 (5–4 p)	Entente Parigné/Landéan (9)
195.	Le Reveil Seglinois (11)	0–5	FC Canton du Sel (10)
196.	Lanvéoc Sports (10)	4–0	AS Telgruc-sur-Mer (10)
197.	US La Baie La Fresnais (10)	1–4	Pleurtuit Côte d'Emeraude (9)
198.	AS Trémuson (10)	0–3	US Saint-Carreuc-Hénon (9)
199.	Rance Coëtquen Football (9)	4–1	AS Broons-Trémeur (10)
200.	ASAC Hémonstoir (11)	0–7	CS Illifaut (9)
201.	FC Kreiz Breizh (10)	6–1	AS La Montagne (11)
202.	RC Plusquellec (11)	1–8	FC La Croix-Corlay (9)
203.	Avenir du Goëlo (9)	2–1	Goëlo FC (9)
204.	FC Gars du Roc'h (11)	3–0	FC des Enclos (9)
205.	US Morlaix (11)	0–16	Paotred Rosko (9)
206.	US Aber-Benoît Tréglonou (11)	1–12	Gars Saint-Majan (9)
207.	AS Queliverzan (10)	0–3 (Note: AS Queliverzan penalised for fielding ineligible players, US Plougonvelin qualify.)	US Plougonvelin (9)
208.	FC Penn-ar-Bed (10)	0–1	Gas d'Ys Tréboul (9)
209.	AS Plouhinec (10)	1–5	JS Plogastel (9)
210.	AC Carhaix (10)	5–0	US Kergloff (10)
211.	FC Pléchâtel Saint-Senoux (11)	0–3	AC Redonnais (9)
212.	ES Quelneuc (10)	1–2	JA Peillac (9)
213.	ES Cournon-Glénac (10)	2–2 (4–3 p)	Armoricaine Péaule (9)
214.	ES Larré-Molac (9)	1–2	Ajoncs d'Or Saint-Nolff (10)
215.	Stade Landévantais (10)	1–3	Fleur d'Ajonc Inzinzac (10)
216.	Melrand Sports (9)	0–1	Garde du Gohazé Saint Thuriau (10)
217.	FOLC Lorient Ouest (9)	7–0	Avenir Sainte-Hélène (10)
218.	Avenir du Pays Pourleth (10)	0–3	Stiren Cléguer FC (8)
219.	Avenir Buléon-Lantillac (10)	1–3	AS Saint-Jean-Brévelay (11)
220.	SC Luitré-Dompierre (11)	0–4	ASE Lécousse (9)
221.	FC Plerguer Roz (10)	1–1 (4–1 p)	US Saint-Jouan-des-Guérets (8)
222.	US Saint-Armel (9)	1–2	JA Bréal (9)
223.	US Illet Forêt (9)	6–1	AS Melting Villejean (9)
224.	Fougères FC (10)	1–1 (4–5 p)	Maen Roch FC (9)
225.	ES Saint-Germain/Montours (9)	2–2 (4–2 p)	Espérance La Bouëxière (8)
226.	ES Gouézec (11)	0–4	Stade Pleybennois (9)
227.	US Chanteloup (11)	1–3	Ossé Saint-Aubin (9)
228.	ASL Saint-Julien (9)	6–1	ES Hénansal-Saint-Denoual-La Bouillie Emeraude (10)
229.	ES Mélorienne (11)	0–5	US Plouasne-Saint-Juvat (9)
230.	AS Motterieux (9)	3–0	ALSL Plémy (10)
231.	US Saint-Caradec (10)	3–1	JS Allineuc (9)
232.	FC Poulancre-Múr-Saint-Gilles (10)	5–0	AS Kérien-Magoar (11)
233.	AS Plussulien (10)	0–1	US Argoat-Pélem (9)
234.	FC Sainte-Sève (10)	1–5	Stade Léonard Kreisker (9)
235.	AS Saint-Martin-des-Champs (10)	1–0	AS Santec (9)
236.	Légion Saint-Pierre (10)	7–2	AS Guilers (9)
237.	AJA Bréles Lanildut (11)	0–2	ES Locmaria-Plouzané (9)
238.	ES Landudec-Guiler (10)	0–3	US Pluguffan (9)
239.	Goulien Sports (10)	0–3	ES Beuzec (9)
240.	Gas du Menez-Hom (10)	3–3 (4–3 p)	US Crozon-Morgat (9)
241.	Association Châtillon-en-Vendelais/Princé (10)	0–2	CS Servon (9)
242.	SC Goven (11)	1–0	US Pont-Péan (12)
243.	Saint-Clair Réguiny (9)	0–3	US Rohannaise (10)
244.	FC Quistinic (11)	1–2	Vigilante Radenac (10)
245.	ASC Baden (10)	2–4	Gazélec AC Morbihan (10)
246.	AG Arzal (10)	0–3	JF Noyal-Muzillac (9)

=== Second round ===
These matches were played on 31 August and 1 September 2024, with one postponed until 8 September 2024.

Second round results: Brittany
Tie no	Home team (tier)	Score	Away team (tier)
1.	Elan Montertelot (10)	0–11	US La Gacilly (8)
2.	Gas d'Ys Tréboul (9)	4–2	La Plozévetienne (8)
3.	Gars de Plomeur (10)	1–3	ES Plogonnec (8)
4.	Marcassins Sportif Tréogat (9)	0–8	Stella Maris Douarnenez (7)
5.	Châteaulin FC (7)	1–1 (5–4 p)	Espoir Clohars Fouesnant (8)
6.	Racing Cast-Porzay (10)	0–3	Amicale Italia Bretagne (8)
7.	AS Diables du Juch (9)	2–3	US Saint-Évarzec (8)
8.	FC Pen Hir Camaret (9)	3–2	US Pluguffan (9)
9.	Gourlizon Sport (9)	2–2 (4–5 p)	Plonéour FC (9)
10.	JS Plogastel (9)	3–1	FC Quimper Penhars (9)
11.	Lanvéoc Sports (10)	0–2	Cormorans Sportif de Penmarc'h (8)
12.	FC Odet (9)	3–1	AS Pont-de-Buis (10)
13.	Gas du Menez-Hom (10)	1–2	FC Pont-l'Abbé (7)
14.	AS Plomelin (9)	4–0	US Quéménéven (9)
15.	ES Mahalon-Confort (9)	1–1 (3–4 p)	ES Beuzec (9)
16.	Quimper Kerfeunteun FC (7)	6–3	AS Plobannalec-Lesconil (7)
17.	AS Baye La Morena (11)	4–0	ÉS Névez (10)
18.	US Châteauneuf-du-Faou (11)	0–7	Fleur de Genêt Bannalec (8)
19.	Stade Mellacois (9)	1–2	Dernières Cartouches Carhaix (8)
20.	AS Kernével (10)	2–1	Stade Pleybennois (9)
21.	Toros Plounévézel (10)	1–6	EA Scaër (7)
22.	US Cléden-Poher (9)	0–2	US Moëlan (7)
23.	Glaziks de Coray (9)	3–0	AS Tréméven (9)
24.	AC Carhaix (10)	2–7	Hermine Concarnoise (8)
25.	Gourin FC (8)	1–3	Quimper Ergué-Armel FC (7)
26.	Mélénicks Elliant (9)	2–2 (1–3 p)	Amicale Ergué-Gabéric (7)
27.	ES Rédené (10)	0–3	Gars de Plonévez-du-Faou (10)
28.	PB Spézet (8)	0–2	FC Quimperlois (7)
29.	US Fouesnant (9)	3–0	Saint-Thois Sports (10)
30.	CA Forestois (8)	5–2	FC Aven-Bélon (9)
31.	JG Forestoise (11)	0–7	Gars Saint-Majan (9)
32.	FA de la Rade (9)	4–4 (5–6 p)	ASPTT Brest (8)
33.	ES Cranou (9)	1–3	FC Lampaulais (8)
34.	ES Locmaria-Plouzané (9)	1–2	US Pencran (9)
35.	ASC Mahoraise Brest (9)	0–2	AS Brest (7)
36.	ÉS Guissenyenne (10)	0–0 (4–5 p)	FC Gouesnou (8)
37.	US Rochoise (10)	1–4	SC Lanrivoaré (9)
38.	US Plougonvelin (9)	2–2 (3–2 p)	FC Lanhouarneau-Plounévez-Lochrist (10)
39.	Légion Saint-Pierre (10)	1–4	Vie au Grand Air Bohars (8)
40.	AS Landéda (9)	2–1	Association Cavale Blanche Brest (10)
41.	Arzelliz Ploudalmézeau (9)	0–0 (2–3 p)	AL Coataudon (8)
42.	SC Lannilis (8)	0–2	Étoile Saint Laurent (7)
43.	ES Portsall Kersaint (7)	1–1 (1–4 p)	Gars de Saint-Yves (7)
44.	Stade Landernéen Kergrèis (9)	4–4 (3–5 p)	Espérance Plouguerneau (8)
45.	ES Berrien-Huelgoat (10)	2–0	FC Gars du Roc'h (11)
46.	US Plouigneau (9)	1–2	ES Mignonne (8)
47.	AS Plouvien (7)	1–2	ES Saint-Thégonnec (8)
48.	Étoile Trégoroise Plougasnou (9)	0–9	SC Morlaix (7)
49.	ÉF Plougourvest (9)	1–0	Guiclan Plouénan FC (8)
50.	Paotred Rosko (9)	0–1	AS Sizun-Le Tréhou (7)
51.	Stade Léonard Kreisker (9)	3–0	AS Saint-Martin-des-Champs (10)
52.	RC Lesnevien (7)	5–5 (4–5 p)	Landi FC (8)
53.	Haut-Léon FC (9)	1–2	FC Plounéventer Plouédern (9)
54.	US Cléder (9)	0–1	ES Carantec-Henvic (8)
55.	FC Plouezoc'h (10)	0–5	Saint-Pierre Plouescat (8)
56.	Avenir Plourin (10)	5–3	ES Pleyber-Christ (9)
57.	Étoile Saint-Yves Ploudaniel (9)	2–0	JU Plougonven (8)
58.	US Langoëlan-Ploërdut (10)	0–7	Stiren Cléguer FC (8)
59.	Étoile de l'Inam (11)	2–4	AS Calanaise (9)
60.	FL Inguiniel (9)	0–2	CS Quéven (8)
61.	Avenir Guiscriff (9)	0–0 (4–2 p)	FOLC Lorient Ouest (9)
62.	FC Meslan (10)	1–3	Languidic FC (8)
63.	US Le Faouët (10)	0–1	Stade Hennebontais (9)
64.	Fleur d'Ajonc Inzinzac (10)	2–5	FC Plouay (8)
65.	JA Arzano (9)	0–2	La Guideloise (8)
66.	Landaul Sports (8)	0–2	ES Ploemel (8)
67.	Stade Gavrais (11)	0–4	Saint-Efflam Kervignac (7)
68.	Riantec OC (9)	3–2	VFL Keryado Lorient (9)
69.	ES Sud Outre Rade (9)	1–5	FC Bélugas Ria (8)
70.	US Goëlands de Larmor-Plage (8)	1–3	FC Ploemeur (7)
71.	AS Guermeur (8)	2–2 (5–3 p)	US Brech (8)
72.	ES Merlevenez (10)	0–5	CEP Lorient (7)
73.	AS Belle-Île-en-Mer (9)	1–1 (3–5 p)	AS Pluvignoise (9)
74.	Lorient Sports (7)	0–4	Plouhinec FC (7)
75.	FC Klegereg (9)	1–4	Garde Saint-Cyr Moréac (8)
76.	Vigilante Radenac (10)	1–6	US Rohannaise (10)
77.	Garde du Gohazé Saint Thuriau (10)	3–4	Ajoncs d'Or Malguénac (9)
78.	SC Sournais (9)	1–4	CS Bignan (7)
79.	Baud FC (7)	2–0	FC Naizin (8)
80.	Saint-Pierre Pleugriffet (10)	1–1 (5–4 p)	Garde Saint-Eloi Kerfourn (9)
81.	Guénin Sport (8)	0–2	CS Pluméliau (8)
82.	Espérance Bréhan (8)	2–1	Moutons Blanc de Noyal-Pontivy (8)
83.	CS Pluneret (9)	3–2	AS Monterblanc (9)
84.	Garde du Loch (9)	1–1 (5–4 p)	Semeurs de Grand-Champ (8)
85.	Gazélec AC Morbihan (10)	1–4	ES Saint-Avé (8)
86.	FC Mégalithes (9)	1–2	ES Plescop (7)
87.	US Arradon (9)	1–1 (4–3 p)	AS Plougoumelen-Bono (8)
88.	ES Colpo (9)	1–2	AS Ménimur (7)
89.	AS Saint-Jean-Brévelay (11)	1–1 (4–3 p)	AS Meucon (9)
90.	ES Mériadec (10)	0–5	Auray FC (7)
91.	AS Moustoir-Ac (9)	1–4	EFC Saint-Jean-Brévelay (9)
92.	Bleuets Néant-sur-Yvel (10)	3–3 (5–4 p)	La Mélécienne de Plumelec (9)
93.	Avenir Campénéac Augan (9)	3–1	Fondelienne Carentoir (9)
94.	Avenir Saint-Servant-sur-Oust (9)	0–7	Enfants de Guer (8)
95.	Chevaliers Saint-Maurice Saint-Guyomard (10)	1–3	US Saint-Abraham Chapelle-Caro (9)
96.	Indépendante Mauronnaise (8)	2–4	Ruffiac-Malestroit (7)
97.	Garde de Mi-Voie Guillac (10)	0–3	Aurore de Taupont (9)
98.	Avenir de Guilliers (10)	2–8	AS Cruguel (8)
99.	Muzillac OS (7)	0–0 (9–10 p)	US Saint-Melaine Rieux (8)
100.	ES Cournon-Glénac (10)	1–9	Montagnards Sulniac (8)
101.	JA Peillac (9)	1–3	CS Saint-Gaudence Allaire (9)
102.	Saint-Clair Limerzel (10)	1–0	Ajoncs d'Or Saint-Nolff (10)
103.	La Patriote Malansac (9)	1–5	Avenir Theix (8)
104.	Etincelle Saint-Jean (11)	0–7	FC Basse Vilaine (8)
105.	Garde du Pont Marzan (8)	0–1	Elvinoise Foot (7)
106.	Les Fougerêts-Saint-Martin-sur-Oust (10)	1–4	JF Noyal-Muzillac (9)
107.	FC Bord de Rance (9)	0–4	Entente Samsonnaise Doloise (7)
108.	US Baguer-Morvan (9)	0–7	FC Aubinois (8)
109.	Maen Roch FC (9)	0–1	ASC Romagné (8)
110.	Cadets Chelun Martigné-Ferchaud (8)	3–1	US Bourgbarré (8)
111.	JA Balazé (8)	2–2 (5–4 p)	Espérance Chartres-de-Bretagne (7)
112.	Hermine de Renac (10)	0–4	Avenir Lieuron (8)
113.	Eskouadenn de Brocéliande (8)	1–1 (5–4 p)	FC Tinténiac-Saint-Domineuc (8)
114.	US Illet Forêt (9)	6–1	OC Brétillien (10)
115.	La Vitréenne FC (8)	3–1	ES Saint-Germain/Montours (9)
116.	FC La Mézière-Melesse (8)	2–2 (2–4 p)	SEP Quédillac (8)
117.	FC Hermitage-Chapelle-Cintré (9)	2–2 (1–3 p)	Combourg SC (9)
118.	Avenir Irodouër (8)	1–2	SC Le Rheu (7)
119.	US Gaël Muel (9)	1–3	AC Rennes (8)
120.	ASE Lécousse (9)	1–3	Noyal-Brécé FC (8)
121.	FC Canton du Sel (10)	1–3	CO Pacéen (7)
122.	Hermine La Noë Blanche (10)	0–6	AS Chantepie (8)
123.	SC Goven (11)	2–1	FC Pays d'Anast (10)
124.	FC Baie du Mont Saint-Michel (10)	1–2	AS Jacques Cartier (8)
125.	Cercle Paul Bert Villejean (10)	2–0	FC Guipry-Messac (7)
126.	AS Saint-Jacques (10)	1–6	AS Retiers-Coësmes (7)
127.	Montfort-Iffendic (9)	1–2	US Noyal-Chatillon (8)
128.	US Gévezé (9)	0–4	US Châteaugiron (7)
129.	Espérance de Rennes (9)	1–1 (4–2 p)	Torcé-Vergéal FC (10)
130.	AS Livré/Mecé (10)	1–5	US Domagné-Saint-Didier (9)
131.	US Val d'Izé (9)	1–0	Bleuets Le Pertre-Brielles-Gennes-Saint-Cyr (8)
132.	AS Saint-Pierraise Épiniac (9)	0–0 (5–4 p)	La Cancalaise (8)
133.	ÉS Saint-Aubin-des-Landes/EF Cornillé (10)	1–5	US Gosné (7)
134.	ASC Saint-Erblon (10)	0–3	CS Betton (8)
135.	US Bel Air (9)	2–2 (6–5 p)	Cercle Paul Bert Gayeulles (9)
136.	FC Mordelles (8)	0–1	FC Guichen (8)
137.	FC Louvigné-La Bazouge (9)	2–2 (2–4 p)	Bocage FC (8)
138.	JA Bréal (9)	3–7	US Grégorienne (7)
139.	FC Plerguer Roz (10)	0–2	US Château-Malo (8)
140.	Ossé Saint-Aubin (9)	3–0	Avenir Domalain (10)
141.	US Acigné (10)	1–1 (5–4 p)	FC La Chapelle-Montgermont (9)
142.	JA Saint-Servan (9)	2–5	AS Miniac-Morvan (7)
143.	Espérance Sixt-sur-Aff (8)	4–1	AC Redonnais (9)
144.	Olympic Montreuil-Landavran (10)	0–3	Jeunes d’Argentré (8)
145.	Stade Louvignéen (9)	0–2	AS Étrelles (8)
146.	CS La Richardais (10)	0–0 (5–4 p)	Cercle Jules Ferry Saint-Malo (8)
147.	Breizh Fobal Klub (10)	0–7	FC Bruz (7)
148.	Pleurtuit Côte d'Emeraude (9)	0–1	FC Dinardais (7)
149.	CS Servon (9)	0–2	Stade Castelbourgeois FC (7)
150.	AS Cheminots Rennais (9)	0–5	FC Beauregard Rennes (7)
151.	US Prat (10)	0–6	CS Rospez (8)
152.	Stade Kénanais (10)	0–9	Trégor FC (8)
153.	JA Penvénan (9)	1–1 (3–4 p)	JS Lanvollon (8)
154.	CS Trégastel (9)	0–4	AS Plestinaise (8)
155.	US Méné Bré Louargat (9)	0–3	Entente du Trieux FC (7)
156.	US Perros-Louannec (8)	4–6	Stade Paimpolais FC (7)
157.	Méné Bré Sports Pédernec (10)	0–11	FC Trébeurden-Pleumeur-Bodou (8)
158.	AS Servel-Lannion (9)	1–0	CS Bégard (7)
159.	US Pays Rochois et Langoatais (10)	0–9	JS Cavan (7)
160.	Goëlands de Plouézec FC (10)	0–2	Pléhédel Sport (11)
161.	AS Pabu Plein Air (9)	2–0	Avenir du Goëlo (9)
162.	US Callac (10)	2–3	US Briacine (8)
163.	AS Grâces (10)	0–2	Pordic-Binic FC (8)
164.	ÉS La Madelene Saint-Guen (12)	0–1	FC Poulancre-Múr-Saint-Gilles (10)
165.	Plounévez-Lanrivain-Trémargat US (9)	0–5	RC Ploumagoar (7)
166.	ES Frout Saint-Agathon (10)	0–10	Saint-Brandan-Quintin FC (7)
167.	FC Plouagat-Châtelaudren-Lanrodec (9)	1–1 (5–3 p)	Ploufragan FC (7)
168.	FC Le Vieux Bourg (10)	1–1 (7–6 p)	US Argoat-Pélem (9)
169.	FC La Croix-Corlay (9)	2–2 (5–4 p)	ÉS Le Fœil (10)
170.	ES Pestivien (10)	0–5	AS Plélo (9)
171.	US Goudelin (9)	0–3	AS Uzel-Merléac (8)
172.	FC Kreiz Breizh (10)	0–4	Rostrenen FC (8)
173.	La Ploeucoise Foot (9)	1–2	Dahus du Mont Bel-Air (8)
174.	Gouessant Foot Coëtmieux-Andel-Morieux-Pommeret (9)	2–2 (3–5 p)	Plaintel SF (7)
175.	AS Trégueux (9)	1–10	Plérin FC (8)
176.	US Saint-Carreuc-Hénon (9)	1–1 (5–4 p)	US Saint-Caradec (10)
177.	FC Moncontour-Trédaniel (8)	0–1	CS Plédran (7)
178.	FC Lié (9)	0–2	Évron FC (8)
179.	FC Saint-Bugan (8)	1–2	US Langueux (7)
180.	JS Landéhen (10)	2–0	AS Motterieux (9)
181.	CS Merdrignac (8)	1–5	Loudéac OSC (7)
182.	ASL Saint-Julien (9)	2–1	Étoile Sud Armor Porhoët (10)
183.	FC Centre Bretagne (9)	4–4 (4–3 p)	Saint-Brieuc Football Ouest (9)
184.	Val d'Arguenon Créhen-Pluduno (9)	2–0	Plancoët Arguenon FC (8)
185.	FC Beaussais-Rance-Frémur (8)	2–3	AS Trélivan (7)
186.	CS Lanrelas (9)	0–3	Stade Pleudihennais (7)
187.	FC Plélan Vildé Corseul (9)	7–0	US Frémur-Fresnaye (10)
188.	US Plouasne-Saint-Juvat (9)	0–3	US Erquy (8)
189.	Rance Coëtquen Football (9)	3–2	FC Le Hinglé Trévron (10)
190.	Stade Évrannais (9)	0–4	Les Vallées FC (8)
191.	CS Illifaut (9)	2–1	US Hunaudaye (9)
192.	RC Dinan (9)	1–1 (5–4 p)	ES Saint-Cast-le-Guildo (10)
193.	AS Guitté Guenroc (10)	0–5	US Yvignac-la-Tour (9)
194.	AS Saint-Eloi La Vraie-Croix (10)	0–7 (Note: Match was originally scheduled for 1 September 2024, but was postponed due to a waterlogged pitch. Replayed on 8 September 2024.)	Sarzeau FC (8)

=== Third round ===
These matches were played on 14 and 15 September 2024.

Third round results: Brittany
Tie no	Home team (tier)	Score	Away team (tier)
1.	Cadets Chelun Martigné-Ferchaud (8)	2–7	AS Vitré (5)
2.	Gars de Plonévez-du-Faou (10)	0–8	Landerneau FC (6)
3.	Avenir Guiscriff (9)	2–3	CEP Lorient (7)
4.	Cadets de Bains (6)	1–2	RC Rannée-La Guerche-Drouges (6)
5.	US Châteaugiron (7)	3–2	FC Guichen (8)
6.	SC Goven (11)	0–2	AS Retiers-Coësmes (7)
7.	SC Le Rheu (7)	3–0	Noyal-Brécé FC (8)
8.	Stade Castelbourgeois FC (7)	3–2	FC Atlantique Vilaine (6)
9.	Eskouadenn de Brocéliande (8)	0–3	Cercle Paul Bert Bréquigny (6)
10.	Jeunes d’Argentré (8)	2–0	La Vitréenne FC (8)
11.	AS Chantepie (8)	4–2	US Bel Air (9)
12.	Espérance Sixt-sur-Aff (8)	0–2	TA Rennes (5)
13.	AS Étrelles (8)	0–1	Espérance de Rennes (9)
14.	Avenir Lieuron (8)	2–1	AC Rennes (8)
15.	US Domagné-Saint-Didier (9)	2–1	US Noyal-Chatillon (8)
16.	Ossé Saint-Aubin (9)	0–2	FC Bruz (7)
17.	OC Cesson (5)	1–1 (4–3 p)	US Liffré (6)
18.	FC Breteil-Talensac (6)	1–1 (7–6 p)	AS Vignoc-Hédé-Guipel (6)
19.	FC Dinardais (7)	2–1	FC Aubinois (8)
20.	Entente Samsonnaise Doloise (7)	0–0 (4–5 p)	FC Beauregard Rennes (7)
21.	US Gosné (7)	0–3	US Fougères (5)
22.	AS Jacques Cartier (8)	1–0	AS Miniac-Morvan (7)
23.	CS Betton (8)	1–3	OC Montauban (6)
24.	Bocage FC (8)	1–0	SEP Quédillac (8)
25.	US Val d'Izé (9)	1–2	JA Balazé (8)
26.	AS Saint-Pierraise Épiniac (9)	1–3	CO Pacéen (7)
27.	US Illet Forêt (9)	7–1	Cercle Paul Bert Villejean (10)
28.	Combourg SC (9)	3–2	US Château-Malo (8)
29.	US Acigné (10)	0–6	US Grégorienne (7)
30.	CS La Richardais (10)	0–4	ASC Romagné (8)
31.	FC Trébeurden-Pleumeur-Bodou (8)	0–3	RC Ploumagoar (7)
32.	AS Servel-Lannion (9)	0–4	FC Plouagat-Châtelaudren-Lanrodec (9)
33.	Trégor FC (8)	0–4	Stade Paimpolais FC (7)
34.	JS Lanvollon (8)	3–1	AS Pabu Plein Air (9)
35.	Pléhédel Sport (11)	0–13	Lannion FC (5)
36.	Entente du Trieux FC (7)	2–2 (5–4 p)	AS Plestinaise (8)
37.	AS Plélo (9)	1–3	CS Rospez (8)
38.	US Briacine (8)	0–3	JS Cavan (7)
39.	ASL Saint-Julien (9)	1–3	FC Centre Bretagne (9)
40.	FC La Croix-Corlay (9)	1–3	Plaintel SF (7)
41.	AS Uzel-Merléac (8)	3–2	Pordic-Binic FC (8)
42.	US Quessoy (6)	2–2 (1–3 p)	CO Briochin Sportif Ploufraganais (6)
43.	Rostrenen FC (8)	5–3	US Saint-Carreuc-Hénon (9)
44.	FC Poulancre-Múr-Saint-Gilles (10)	2–5	Saint-Brandan-Quintin FC (7)
45.	CS Plédran (7)	2–2 (4–2 p)	Plérin FC (8)
46.	FC Le Vieux Bourg (10)	0–9	Loudéac OSC (7)
47.	Les Vallées FC (8)	1–6	RC Dinan (9)
48.	CS Illifaut (9)	2–6	AS Ginglin Cesson (6)
49.	AS Trélivan (7)	0–0 (6–7 p)	Dahus du Mont Bel-Air (8)
50.	JS Landéhen (10)	0–3	US Langueux (7)
51.	FC Plélan Vildé Corseul (9)	1–1 (2–3 p)	Stade Pleudihennais (7)
52.	US Yvignac-la-Tour (9)	1–2	Lamballe FC (6)
53.	US Erquy (8)	3–0	Val d'Arguenon Créhen-Pluduno (9)
54.	Évron FC (8)	4–0	Rance Coëtquen Football (9)
55.	FC Plounéventer Plouédern (9)	1–5	Gars de Saint-Yves (7)
56.	SC Morlaix (7)	2–1	Stade Plabennécois (5)
57.	ASPTT Brest (8)	4–3	AS Landéda (9)
58.	ES Carantec-Henvic (8)	1–0	Étoile Saint-Yves Ploudaniel (9)
59.	ÉF Plougourvest (9)	2–3	AG Plouvorn (6)
60.	Espérance Plouguerneau (8)	5–0	Stade Léonard Kreisker (9)
61.	Saint-Pierre Plouescat (8)	0–3	Plouzané AC (6)
62.	Étoile Saint Laurent (7)	1–4	EA Saint-Renan (6)
63.	FC Lampaulais (8)	3–1	Vie au Grand Air Bohars (8)
64.	SC Lanrivoaré (9)	1–1 (3–5 p)	AS Brest (7)
65.	Gars Saint-Majan (9)	0–0 (2–3 p)	US Plougonvelin (9)
66.	ES Plogonnec (8)	0–8	Saint-Pierre de Milizac (5)
67.	Quimper Ergué-Armel FC (7)	1–0	Quimper Kerfeunteun FC (7)
68.	ES Mignonne (8)	0–5	Guipavas GdR (6)
69.	Gas d'Ys Tréboul (9)	0–3	Glaziks de Coray (9)
70.	Avenir Plourin (10)	3–4	AS Sizun-Le Tréhou (7)
71.	Landi FC (8)	1–1 (4–3 p)	AL Coataudon (8)
72.	US Pencran (9)	2–5	FC Gouesnou (8)
73.	FC Pen Hir Camaret (9)	3–0	ES Berrien-Huelgoat (10)
74.	Dernières Cartouches Carhaix (8)	1–1 (4–3 p)	Plougastel FC (6)
75.	ES Saint-Thégonnec (8)	2–0	Châteaulin FC (7)
76.	Cormorans Sportif de Penmarc'h (8)	2–1	CA Forestois (8)
77.	AS Kernével (10)	0–3	FC Quimperlois (7)
78.	Fleur de Genêt Bannalec (8)	2–2 (5–6 p)	JS Plogastel (9)
79.	FC Odet (9)	0–2	Amicale Ergué-Gabéric (7)
80.	AS Baye La Morena (11)	1–2	ES Beuzec (9)
81.	Plonéour FC (9)	2–1	AS Plomelin (9)
82.	Hermine Concarnoise (8)	5–1	US Fouesnant (9)
83.	FC Pont-l'Abbé (7)	2–2 (4–1 p)	PD Ergué-Gabéric (5)
84.	Stella Maris Douarnenez (7)	2–3	US Trégunc (6)
85.	Amicale Italia Bretagne (8)	2–1	US Moëlan (7)
86.	EA Scaër (7)	4–2	US Saint-Évarzec (8)
87.	Stade Pontivyen (6)	1–3	Séné FC (6)
88.	Avenir Theix (8)	0–0 (4–2 p)	Stade Hennebontais (9)
89.	Avenir Campénéac Augan (9)	1–5	AS Ménimur (7)
90.	AS Calanaise (9)	2–1	Riantec OC (9)
91.	La Guideloise (8)	4–3	CS Pluméliau (8)
92.	ES Ploemel (8)	0–5	Vannes OC (5)
93.	US Rohannaise (10)	1–7	Aurore de Taupont (9)
94.	AS Cruguel (8)	1–5	Ploërmel FC (6)
95.	CS Bignan (7)	1–0	Languidic FC (8)
96.	EFC Saint-Jean-Brévelay (9)	1–2	Bleuets Néant-sur-Yvel (10)
97.	Garde Saint-Cyr Moréac (8)	4–1	US Arradon (9)
98.	AS Pluvignoise (9)	1–1 (4–5 p)	Ruffiac-Malestroit (7)
99.	Sarzeau FC (8)	1–2	US Saint-Abraham Chapelle-Caro (9)
100.	CS Saint-Gaudence Allaire (9)	3–7	US Montagnarde (6)
101.	Saint-Efflam Kervignac (7)	2–1	Montagnards Sulniac (8)
102.	FC Plouay (8)	0–2	Enfants de Guer (8)
103.	Saint-Clair Limerzel (10)	0–4	US La Gacilly (8)
104.	Stiren Cléguer FC (8)	0–3	Keriolets de Pluvigner (6)
105.	Plouhinec FC (7)	2–2 (6–5 p)	GSI Pontivy (5)
106.	Saint-Pierre Pleugriffet (10)	0–5	Espérance Bréhan (8)
107.	AS Guermeur (8)	1–0	Garde du Loch (9)
108.	ES Saint-Avé (8)	3–1	CS Quéven (8)
109.	JF Noyal-Muzillac (9)	0–3	Elvinoise Foot (7)
110.	CS Pluneret (9)	0–2	Auray FC (7)
111.	Ajoncs d'Or Malguénac (9)	0–4	Baud FC (7)
112.	AS Saint-Jean-Brévelay (11)	1–7	FC Bélugas Ria (8)
113.	ES Plescop (7)	4–0	US Saint-Melaine Rieux (8)
114.	FC Ploemeur (7)	2–2 (3–4 p)	FC Basse Vilaine (8)

=== Fourth round ===
These matches were played on 28 and 29 September 2024.

Fourth round results: Brittany
Tie no	Home team (tier)	Score	Away team (tier)
1.	Landi FC (8)	3–0	ES Carantec-Henvic (8)
2.	AS Sizun-Le Tréhou (7)	8–1	ASPTT Brest (8)
3.	FC Gouesnou (8)	2–2 (1–3 p)	Entente du Trieux FC (7)
4.	RC Ploumagoar (7)	0–1	Lannion FC (5)
5.	AS Brest (7)	0–2	SC Morlaix (7)
6.	AG Plouvorn (6)	0–1	Stade Briochin (4)
7.	CS Rospez (8)	0–4	Guipavas GdR (6)
8.	US Plougonvelin (9)	1–1 (3–5 p)	AS Uzel-Merléac (8)
9.	JS Cavan (7)	1–4	EA Saint-Renan (6)
10.	FC Plouagat-Châtelaudren-Lanrodec (9)	1–1 (3–0 p)	Espérance Plouguerneau (8)
11.	Saint-Pierre de Milizac (5)	2–0	Landerneau FC (6)
12.	Dernières Cartouches Carhaix (8)	2–1	Rostrenen FC (8)
13.	Stade Paimpolais FC (7)	6–0	JS Lanvollon (8)
14.	ES Saint-Thégonnec (8)	2–6	FC Lampaulais (8)
15.	Gars de Saint-Yves (7)	4–3	Plouzané AC (6)
16.	Hermine Concarnoise (8)	2–3	Quimper Ergué-Armel FC (7)
17.	AS Guermeur (8)	0–3	US Trégunc (6)
18.	JS Plogastel (9)	3–1	AS Calanaise (9)
19.	La Guideloise (8)	1–3	Cormorans Sportif de Penmarc'h (8)
20.	ES Beuzec (9)	1–4	CEP Lorient (7)
21.	Keriolets de Pluvigner (6)	0–3	Saint-Colomban Sportive Locminé (4)
22.	US Saint-Abraham Chapelle-Caro (9)	1–3	Amicale Ergué-Gabéric (7)
23.	FC Pen Hir Camaret (9)	1–6	FC Pont-l'Abbé (7)
24.	Glaziks de Coray (9)	1–4	Auray FC (7)
25.	EA Scaër (7)	0–2	Vannes OC (5)
26.	Plonéour FC (9)	0–5	ES Plescop (7)
27.	FC Quimperlois (7)	2–2 (4–5 p)	Amicale Italia Bretagne (8)
28.	FC Bélugas Ria (8)	3–0	Saint-Efflam Kervignac (7)
29.	Séné FC (6)	1–4	US Montagnarde (6)
30.	Baud FC (7)	1–0	Plouhinec FC (7)
31.	Combourg SC (9)	1–0	US Erquy (8)
32.	FC Dinardais (7)	5–0	AS Jacques Cartier (8)
33.	Espérance de Rennes (9)	2–2 (12–11 p)	US Grégorienne (7)
34.	Bocage FC (8)	1–0	AS Chantepie (8)
35.	Lamballe FC (6)	3–1	US Langueux (7)
36.	Plaintel SF (7)	1–1 (4–2 p)	US Fougères (5)
37.	FC Centre Bretagne (9)	1–1 (4–5 p)	Stade Pleudihennais (7)
38.	Dahus du Mont Bel-Air (8)	1–1 (2–3 p)	CS Plédran (7)
39.	Saint-Brandan-Quintin FC (7)	1–3	TA Rennes (5)
40.	ASC Romagné (8)	1–1 (6–5 p)	OC Montauban (6)
41.	US Illet Forêt (9)	0–3	FC Beauregard Rennes (7)
42.	AS Ginglin Cesson (6)	2–0	SC Le Rheu (7)
43.	RC Dinan (9)	3–2	Loudéac OSC (7)
44.	CO Pacéen (7)	0–5	Dinan Léhon FC (4)
45.	Évron FC (8)	0–2	CO Briochin Sportif Ploufraganais (6)
46.	Jeunes d’Argentré (8)	0–1	US Châteaugiron (7)
47.	FC Bruz (7)	0–0 (4–3 p)	Ploërmel FC (6)
48.	AS Vitré (5)	4–0	FC Breteil-Talensac (6)
49.	AS Retiers-Coësmes (7)	2–0	Espérance Bréhan (8)
50.	Aurore de Taupont (9)	0–2	Garde Saint-Cyr Moréac (8)
51.	Bleuets Néant-sur-Yvel (10)	1–3	Cercle Paul Bert Bréquigny (6)
52.	US La Gacilly (8)	1–4	OC Cesson (5)
53.	RC Rannée-La Guerche-Drouges (6)	3–0	AS Ménimur (7)
54.	FC Basse Vilaine (8)	0–3	CS Bignan (7)
55.	Enfants de Guer (8)	2–0	Avenir Theix (8)
56.	US Domagné-Saint-Didier (9)	0–6	US Saint-Malo (4)
57.	Ruffiac-Malestroit (7)	2–0	Stade Castelbourgeois FC (7)
58.	JA Balazé (8)	1–1 (5–3 p)	Elvinoise Foot (7)
59.	Avenir Lieuron (8)	1–3	ES Saint-Avé (8)

=== Fifth round ===
These matches were played on 12 and 13 October 2024.

Fifth round results: Brittany
Tie no	Home team (tier)	Score	Away team (tier)
1.	US Trégunc (6)	1–1 (3–2 p)	Guipavas GdR (6)
2.	Quimper Ergué-Armel FC (7)	2–0	Gars de Saint-Yves (7)
3.	Lannion FC (5)	0–2	Stade Briochin (4)
4.	Entente du Trieux FC (7)	0–3	Stade Paimpolais FC (7)
5.	Cormorans Sportif de Penmarc'h (8)	0–8	US Montagnarde (6)
6.	CEP Lorient (7)	3–1	Amicale Italia Bretagne (8)
7.	AS Uzel-Merléac (8)	1–0	FC Lampaulais (8)
8.	SC Morlaix (7)	0–1	Auray FC (7)
9.	FC Pont-l'Abbé (7)	0–3	Saint-Pierre de Milizac (5)
10.	FC Plouagat-Châtelaudren-Lanrodec (9)	0–3	Saint-Colomban Sportive Locminé (4)
11.	FC Bélugas Ria (8)	2–0	Landi FC (8)
12.	EA Saint-Renan (6)	3–0	Amicale Ergué-Gabéric (7)
13.	AS Sizun-Le Tréhou (7)	1–2	Baud FC (7)
14.	JS Plogastel (9)	1–1 (3–4 p)	Dernières Cartouches Carhaix (8)
15.	Plaintel SF (7)	0–4	US Concarneau (3)
16.	CS Plédran (7)	0–9	US Saint-Malo (4)
17.	AS Retiers-Coësmes (7)	2–2 (2–3 p)	Dinan Léhon FC (4)
18.	CS Bignan (7)	0–2	Bocage FC (8)
19.	US Châteaugiron (7)	0–3	AS Vitré (5)
20.	Garde Saint-Cyr Moréac (8)	2–6	CO Briochin Sportif Ploufraganais (6)
21.	RC Dinan (9)	0–0 (2–4 p)	Cercle Paul Bert Bréquigny (6)
22.	ES Plescop (7)	4–0	JA Balazé (8)
23.	Espérance de Rennes (9)	1–1 (2–4 p)	ASC Romagné (8)
24.	FC Dinardais (7)	3–2	Lamballe FC (6)
25.	ES Saint-Avé (8)	0–4	Vannes OC (5)
26.	Stade Pleudihennais (7)	0–1	TA Rennes (5)
27.	Enfants de Guer (8)	0–0 (5–4 p)	FC Bruz (7)
28.	Combourg SC (9)	1–1 (3–4 p)	Ruffiac-Malestroit (7)
29.	OC Cesson (5)	3–0	RC Rannée-La Guerche-Drouges (6)
30.	FC Beauregard Rennes (7)	1–3	AS Ginglin Cesson (6)

=== Sixth round ===
These matches were played on 26 and 27 October 2024.

Sixth round results: Brittany
Tie no	Home team (tier)	Score	Away team (tier)
1.	AS Uzel-Merléac (8)	0–4	Stade Briochin (4)
2.	Quimper Ergué-Armel FC (7)	0–3	Dinan Léhon FC (4)
3.	EA Saint-Renan (6)	1–2	Saint-Colomban Sportive Locminé (4)
4.	Stade Paimpolais FC (7)	2–1	Enfants de Guer (8)
5.	CEP Lorient (7)	0–1	Saint-Pierre de Milizac (5)
6.	ASC Romagné (8)	0–0 (4–5 p)	CO Briochin Sportif Ploufraganais (6)
7.	OC Cesson (5)	5–0	US Trégunc (6)
8.	FC Dinardais (7)	1–2	TA Rennes (5)
9.	Auray FC (7)	1–1 (3–4 p)	Ruffiac-Malestroit (7)
10.	AS Vitré (5)	8–0	Cercle Paul Bert Bréquigny (6)
11.	FC Bélugas Ria (8)	0–2	US Montagnarde (6)
12.	ES Plescop (7)	1–3	Vannes OC (5)
13.	Bocage FC (8)	0–2	US Saint-Malo (4)
14.	Dernières Cartouches Carhaix (8)	0–3	AS Ginglin Cesson (6)
15.	Baud FC (7)	0–2	US Concarneau (3)
