= Uncle Phil =

Uncle Phil or Uncle Philip may refer to:

== People ==
- Phil Knight (born 1938), American businessman nicknamed "Uncle Phil"
- Phil Leadbetter (1962–2021), American guitarist nicknamed "Uncle Phil"
- Phil O'Donnell (footballer) (1972–2007), Scottish footballer nicknamed "Uncle Phil"
- Phil Spector (1939–2021), American record producer and songwriter nicknamed "Uncle Phil" on the album The Rolling Stones
- Uncle Philip, pen name of American writer Francis L. Hawks (1798–1866)
- Uncle Phil, stage name of French rapper Iliassa Issilame (born 1980) in the song "Fresh Prince"

== Characters ==
- Philip Banks (The Fresh Prince of Bel-Air), a character nicknamed "Uncle Phil"
- Uncle Phil, a character in the comic strip Mickey Finn
- Uncle Philip, a character in the novel The Magic Toyshop
- Uncle Philip, a character in the television series Webster
- Uncle Phil, a character in the film The Runnin' Kind
- Uncle Philip, a character in the film Farewell to Nostradamus
- Uncle Phil, a character in the television series Mad About You
- Uncle Phil, a character in the film Jolene
