= Who Mad Again =

Single by Jahyanai featuring Bamby
- Released: June 28, 2017
- Recorded: 2017
- Genre: Dancehall
- Label: Kontor
- Songwriters: Jahynai; Bamby; Tadjmc
- Producers: Jahynai; Bamby

Jahyanai singles chronology
"Run Di place" (2016)	"Who Mad Again" (2017)	"Dweet So" (2018)

Bamby singles chronology
"Run Di Place" (2016)	"Who Mad Again" (2017)	"Bad from Mi Born" (2018)

Music video
- "Who Mad Again" on YouTube

"Who Mad Again" is a song by French singer Jahyanai featuring with Bamby, released on June 28, 2017 as their non-album single.

== Writing and composition ==
"Who Mad Again" is a dancehall song with dembow influences written in the key of Dm major with a downtempo of 102 beats per minute.

== Music video ==
As of December 2022, the music video for Who Mad Again had over 31 million views on YouTube.

== Charts ==
Chart (2017–18)	Peak position
Belgium (Ultratip Bubbling Under Flanders)	47
Belgium (Ultratop 50 Wallonia)	35
France (SNEP)	54
France Club 40 (SNEP)	1

== Certifications ==
Region	Certification	Certified units/sales
France (SNEP)	Platinum	200,000^{‡}
^{‡} Sales+streaming figures based on certification alone.
