= Doucement (Makassy song) =

Single by Makassy
- Released: 23 March 2012
- Genre: Pop
- Length: 3:20
- Label: Mostiko
- Songwriters: Alrick Kalala; Tarik Hamiche
- Producers: Tarik Hamiche; Cédric Lokamba; Christian Kayombo Tambwé

Music video
- "Doucement" on YouTube

"Doucement" is a French-language song by Makassy (real name Alrick Kalala), a French soccer player of Congolese origin previously playing in AS Vitré and a singer. The song, his first charting single, was co-written by Kalala himself with Tarik Hamiche and produced by Hamiche, Cédric Lokamba and Christian Kayombo Tambwé. A music video was also released through We Made it Entertainment.

== Track list ==
1. "Doucement" (radio edit) – 3:20
2. "Doucement" (remix Soleil) – 3:46
3. "Doucement" (remix Latino) – 4:24
4. "Doucement" (club extended) – 4:04
5. "Doucement" (remix Reggaeton) – 3:15
6. "Doucement" (Makassy Sensual mix 2015) – 3:26

== Charts ==
Chart (2013)	Peak position
Belgium (Ultratip Bubbling Under Wallonia)	20
France (SNEP)	19
