= Marwa Loud =

French singer (born 1996)

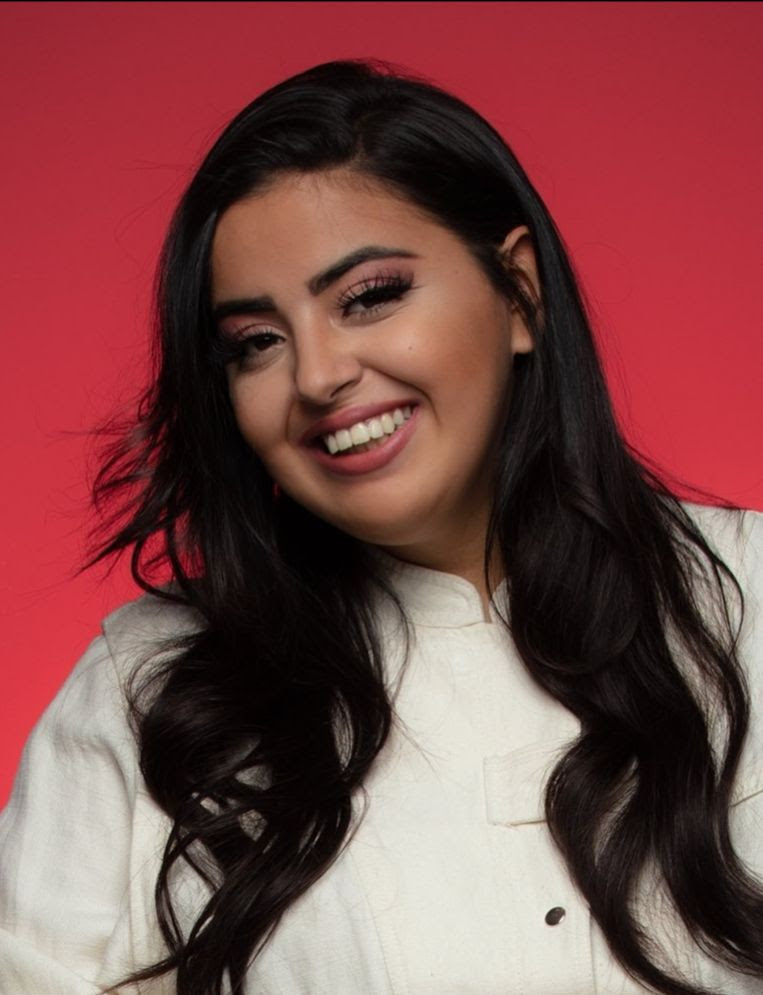

Background information
- Born: Marwa Outamghart; 12 December 1996 (age 29)
- Genres: Pop; French hip-hop; R&B
- Occupation: Singer
- Years active: 2016–present
- Label: Purple Money

Marwa Outamghart (born 12 December 1996), commonly known as Marwa Loud, is a French singer. In 2017, she was signed to Lartiste's record label Purple Money Purple (PMP). She is best known for a number of singles, notably "Bimbo". Her debut album Loud was certified gold in 2018 reaching number 2 on the French Albums Chart and also charting in Belgium, Netherlands and Switzerland. Her song "Bad Boy" rose to popularity after several videos on social media used the song over clips of English footballer Mason Mount doing his signature goal celebration.

== Personal life ==
Outamghart is of Moroccan origin. Her parents come from a Berber village near Beni Mellal.

== Discography ==
=== Albums ===
Year	Title	Peak chart positions					Certifications
Year	Title	FRA	BEL (Fl)	BEL (Wa)	NLD	SWI	Certifications
2018	Loud	2	63	6	37	90	FRA: 2× Platinum
2019	My Life	11	—	23	—	—	
2021	Again	11	—	47	—	—	
2023	Cloud	9	—	140	—	—	

=== Singles ===
Year	Title	Peak chart positions		Album
Year	Title	FRA	BEL (Wa)	Album
2017	"Mehdi"	48	— (Note: "Mehdi" did not enter the Ultratop 50, but was noted as making the Ultratip chart.)	Loud
2018	"Fallait pas"	4	47	Loud
2018	"Billet"	5	— (Note: "Billet" did not enter the Ultratop 50, but peaked atop the Ultratip chart.)	Loud
2018	"Bad Boy"	23	— (Note: "Bad Boy" did not enter the Ultratop 50, but peaked atop the Ultratip chart.)	Loud
2019	"T'es où?"	81	— (Note: "T'es où?" did not enter the Ultratop 50, but peaked at number 25 on the Ultratip chart.)	My Life
2019	"Oh la folle"	38	— (Note: "Oh la folle" did not enter the Ultratop 50, but peaked at number 11 on the Ultratip chart.)	My Life
2020	"Allez les gros" (feat. Naza)	39	— (Note: "Allez les gros" did not enter the Ultratop 50, but peaked at number 8 on the Ultratip chart.)	My Life
2021	"Allo" (with Eva)	25	—	Again
2021	"Bimbo" (with Moha K)	6	35	Again

=== Featured in ===
Year	Title	Peak chart positions		Album
Year	Title	FRA	BEL (Wa)	Album
2017	"Mi Corazón" (DJ Sem feat. Marwa Loud)	20	28	Non-album single
2017	"Je vais t'oublier" (Jul feat. Marwa Loud)	22	–	Jul album La tête dans les nuages
2021	"Zone" (Benab feat. Marwa Loud)	90	–	Benab album Au clair de la rue (Part. 1)

=== Other charted songs ===
Year	Title	Peak chart positions		Album
Year	Title	FRA	BEL (Wa)	Album
2018	"Ça y est" (feat. Jul)	12	—	Loud
2018	"Je voulais" (feat. Laguardia)	27	—	Loud
2018	"Fâché"	11	—	Loud
2018	"Qu'est ce que t'as"	19	— (Note: "Qu'est ce que t'as" did not enter the Ultratop 50, but was noted as making the Ultratip chart.)	Loud
2018	"Calma"	69	–	Loud
2019	"Tell Me"	111	—	My Life
2019	"My Life"	167	—	My Life
2020	"Ça va aller"	160	— (Note: "Ça va aller" did not enter the Ultratop 50, but peaked at number 24 on the Ultratip chart.)	
