= Club 40 =

French weekly music chart

Club 40 is a French weekly music chart that reflects spinning of tunes in French clubs. It was established by Yacast France Institute in collaboration with Syndicat National de l'Édition Phonographique (SNEP) in response to the need of music label producers and publishing houses to test the commercial viability of certain dance releases. Most electronic music is propagated initially through limited music releases and promoted through various clubs. In case a certain title gets notoriety on the dance floor of such clubs, a bigger label can take on and promote it on a bigger scale in general charts. Many of the biggest club dance hits appeared initially in Club 40 charts before becoming famous on general music charts in France and worldwide.

== Broadcasts ==
Club 40 chart commenced in September 2002. It was initially broadcast September 2002 on Europe 2 on Saturday from 10 pm to 1 am by Christophe Marceaux in two parts: a top 5 a general chart encompassing all styles (including R'n'B and electro), followed by a top 40 of Techno and House music. Europe 2 stopped its broadcasting of Club 40 chart on 31 July 2004.

The chart was picked up in September 2005 by French Fun Radio under the alternative title Fun Club 40 , and was broadcast Saturdays from 5 pm to 7 pm and was presented by Mico. The broadcast consisted of two parts, the top 5 Fun Club 40 being the previous week's chart toppers followed by the Club 40 chart of the week.

Since September 2008, Club 40 chart has been broadcast on French NRJ radio station under the new title NRJ Club 40 mixed every Saturday evening by DJ Morgan Nagoya and presented by Romuald Boulanger. For 2008–2009 season the time slot allocated was 10 pm to midnight and for 2009–2010 season 9 to 10 pm. Beginning 2010, it was relegated to Friday-Saturday night from 2 to 3 AM and without the presence of a live DJ animator.

Starting 2010, the chart is also being broadcast on French MTV Idol Saturday midnights until 1:30 am.

== Methodology ==
Yacast France Institute publishes Club 40 chart weekly based on spinning of the songs in 80 selected French discothèques deemed a representative sample of such clubs. Monitoring is done through "black boxes" attached to DJ mixers in these clubs on week-end shows running Fridays and Saturdays from 11:45 pm to 4:30 am with recordings relayed to Yacast production center for analysis and classification.

== See also ==
- List of Club 40 number-one hits
- List of record charts
