= Cosmo (song) =

Single by Soprano

from the album Cosmopolitanie
- Released: 18 August 2014
- Genre: R&B
- Length: 3:01
- Label: Parlophone Records, Warner Music France
- Songwriters: Soprano; Mej; Houss; Zaho; Da Silva; Fred Savio
- Producers: Mej; Fred Savio

Soprano singles chronology
"Ils nous conaissent pas" (2014)	"Cosmo" (2014)	"Fresh Prince" (2014)

Music video
- "Cosmo" on YouTube

"Cosmo" is a song by French singer and rapper Soprano. It was released on 18 August 2014.

== Charts ==
Chart	Peak position
Belgium (Ultratop 50 Wallonia)	16
France (SNEP)	5
