= AS Vitré =

French football club

- Full name: Amicale Sportive de Vitré
- Founded: 1907
- Ground: Stade Municipal
- Capacity: 3,500
- Chairman: Guy Guyard
- Manager: Laurent Hervé
- League: National 3 Group E
- 2022-23: National 3 Group K, 3rd
- Website: https://asvitre.club
Home colours	Away colours

AS Vitré (French: Amicale Sportive de Vitré) is a French football club based in Vitré, Ille-et-Vilaine. It was founded in 1907. They play at the Stade Municipal, which has a capacity of 3,500. The colours of the club are yellow and red.

For the 2022–23 season the club plays in the Championnat National 3. They finished in the relegation places in 2020–21 Championnat National 2, but were reprieved to fill a vacancy for the following season. However they finished bottom of their group in the 2021–22 season.

== Honours ==
- CFA2 Championship
  - Champions (2): 2005 (Group G), 2013 (Group H)
- Brittany DH Championship
  - Winners (1): 1991

== Players ==
- Alrick Kalala, a previous player of the club pursued a solo musical career after suffering injuries while playing for the club forcing him to leave professional sports. Under his adopted stage name Makassy, he released "Doucement" his first French-language hit that charted in France and Belgium.
- Alain Mendy
