= Collectif Métissé =

French musical group

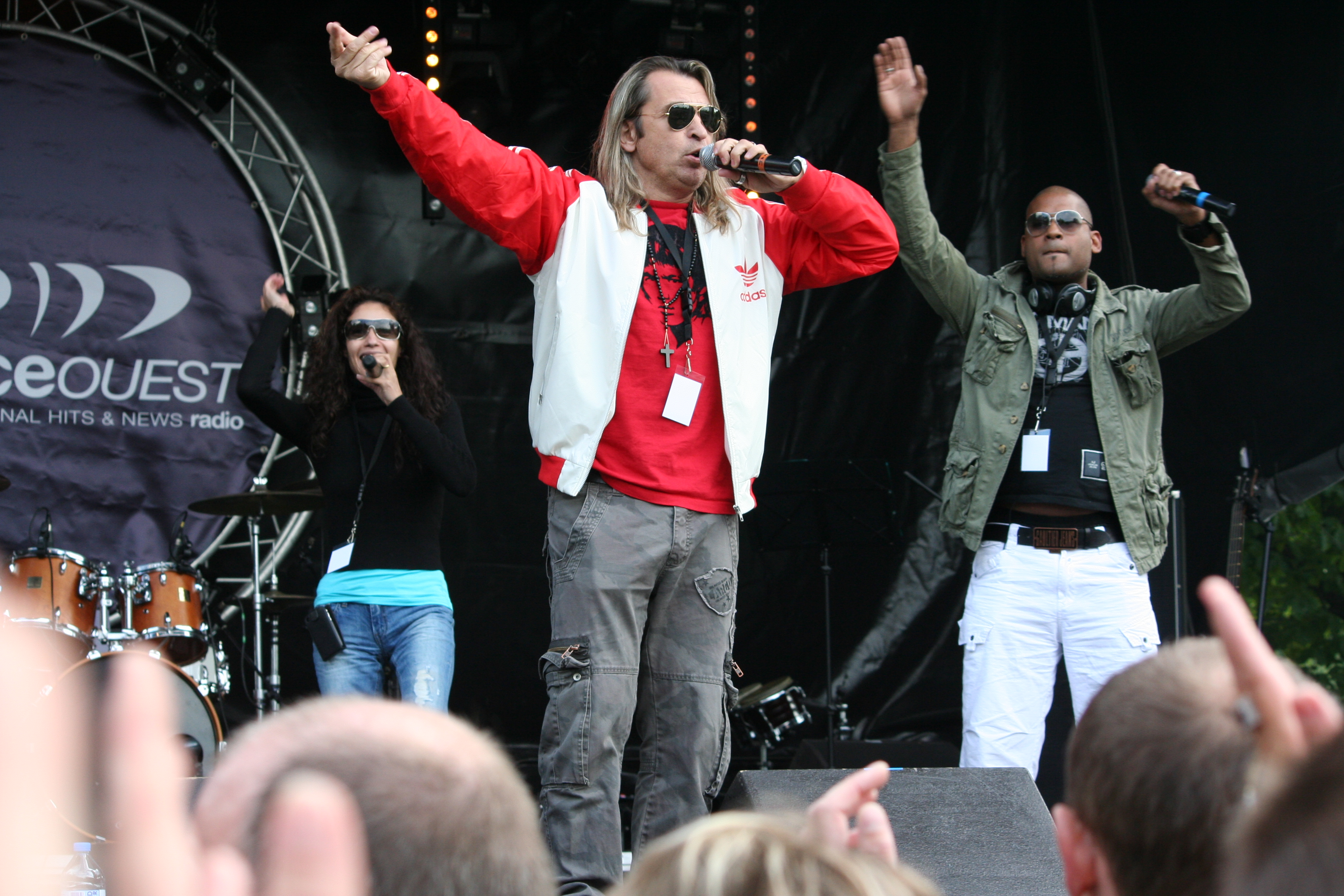
- Collectif Métissé, Live Show at (Saint-Lô) on 20 June 2009

Background information
- Origin: Bordeaux, France
- Genres: Dancehall; reggae
- Years active: 2009–present
- Labels: Universal
- Members: Soma Riba; DJ Fou; Nadia Lahcene; Willy William; Yannick; Amélie Wade; Saint Ange
- Website: collectif-metisse.com

Collectif Métissé is a French musical group with influences ranging from zouk to ragga. They became famous with "Laisse-toi aller bébé" that reached number two in the summer of 2009, becoming a big summer hit.

== Members ==
- Soma Riba, DJ and singer who had released hits like "Yaka dansé" in 2004 and "Vacances j'oublie tout", a remake of "Femme libérée" in 2005. He is the songwriter for the group.
- DJ Fou (real name Sébastien Santovito) known for his 1999 hit "Je mets le Wai", with a mix of ragga and makina. He has a solo album Nyctalopie with 23 electro-danse tunes. He also has collaborations with Soma Riba and DJs at many venues
- Nadia Lahcene, a French singer of Moroccan origin, a vocalist of the group.
- Willy William, a Mauritian-French DJ also known for his many remixes with Big Ali
- Yannick Cotte, a singer from Réunion
- Amélie Wade
- Saint Ange, the last to join in

== Discography ==
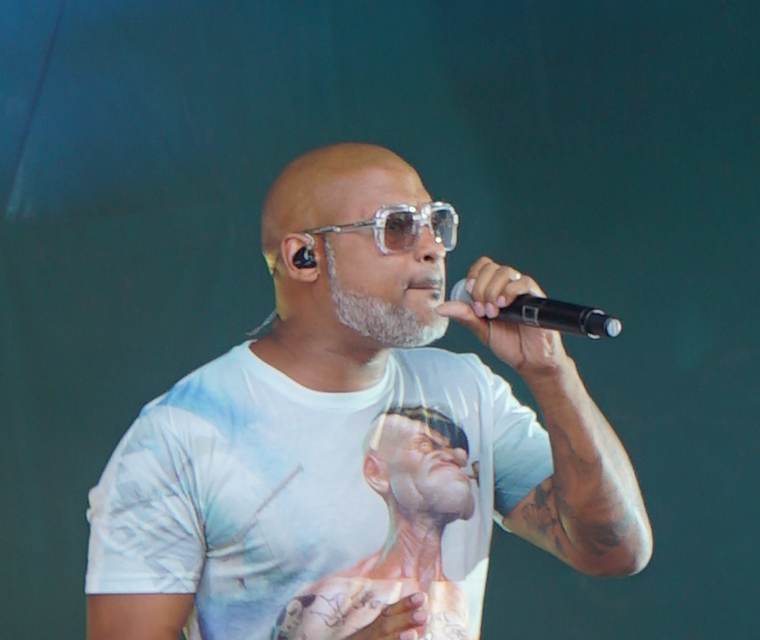
Willy William of Collectif Métissé

=== Albums ===
Year	Albums	Peak position		Certification
Year	Albums	FR	BEL (Wa)	Certification
2009	Collectif Metissé	49	–	
2010	L'Esprit de la fête	75	–	
2011	Destination Soleil	29	–	
2012	Ya plus k danser	79	–	
2014	Destination Fiesta	6	34	
2015	Rendez-vous au soleil	14	57	
2016	Destination été	26	61	
2019	Décennie	63	—	

=== Singles ===
Year	Single	Peak positions	Album
Year	Single	FR	Album
2009	"Laisse-toi aller bébé"	2	Collectif Métissé
2009	"On n'est pas couché"	6	Collectif Métissé
2010	"Collectif Métissé"	7	Collectif Métissé
2010	"Debout pour danser"	1	L'esprit de la fête
2010	"L'été toute l'année"	9	L'esprit de la fête
2011	"Laisse tomber tes problèmes"	8	Destination soleil
2011	"Sexy Lady"	20	Destination soleil
2012	"Destination Rio"	38	
2012	"Z Dance"	29	
2013	"Mariana"	181	
2014	"Hey! Baby!"	87	Destination Fiesta
2015	"Rendez-vous au soleil"	160	Rendez-vous au soleil
