= Kylian Mash =

French DJ and record producer (born 1983)

- Kylian Mash

Background information
- Born: Rémy Fischer; 14 February 1983 (age 42); Paris, France
- Genres: House dance pop hip house
- Occupation(s): DJ, record producer
- Instrument: Phonograph
- Years active: 2008-present
- Labels: Universal/Barclay (France); Sony BMG (France); Time (Italy); Columbia (UK); Ultra Records (US); Megaliner (Russia)
- Website: http://www.kylianmash.net

Rémy Fischer (French pronunciation: [ʁemi fiʃœʁ]; born 14 February 1983, in Paris), better known by his stage name Kylian Mash, is a French DJ and record producer. He is known for his hits including those for Discobitch, Club Certified, Closer, and No Tomorrow. He has collaborated with Akon, Snoop Dogg, Flo-Rida, and Timbaland. He also had founded his own record label, Most Wanted Music, which publishes and produces numerous musical projects.

== Biography ==
Mash was jointly awarded his first gold record in 2008 with the project Discobitch and their single "C'est beau la bourgeoisie", which charted at number 2 in France and Belgium. The track was reviewed by Perez Hilton, the Pussycat Dolls and Madonna, This led to work with Akon, Snoop Dogg, Glasses Malone, Lil Wayne, Flo Rida, Coolio, JayKay, Timbaland, Missy Elliott, and Mohombi; as well as collaborations with Sandy Vee.

Mash's other projects included his remix of "Rhythm is a Dancer" and "Wicked Wow", which was produced for Carolina Marquez. His work has entered the playlists of DJs such as David Guetta, Joachim Garraud, DJ Chuckie and Eric Morillo.

At the same time, Mash founded in 2010 his own music label, Most Wanted Music, which has worked with Universal, Sony, Warner, EMI, Ultra and Ministry of Sound.

== Partial discography ==
=== Productions ===
- 2008: Kylian Mash & Emoblaster Funkster
- 2008: Kylian Mash & XXII Bitch
- 2008: Kylian Mash & Laurent Konrad pres. Discobitch – C'est beau la bourgeoisie Remixed by: Kevin Tandarsen, BodyBangers
- 2010: NYX – Fly Away Remixed by: Arias – Yohann Simon – Austin Leeds
- 2010: Madinshina – Rhythm Is a Dancer Remixed by: Jay Style – The Henchmen – Claude NJoya & Richard Bahericz
- 2010: Kylian Mash & Akon & Glasses – Club Certified Remixed by: Gregori Klosman & Danny Wild – Fred Pellichero & Laurent Pepper
- 2011: Kylian Mash feat Snoop Dogg & Ekow – Closer (Do It Well)
- 2011: Carolina Marquez – Wicked Wow Remixed by: Dj Chuckie
- 2012: Angelika Vee vs. Kylian Mash – Cash Out

=== Remixes ===
- 2010: Coolio Vs. Kylian Mash & Tim Resler – "Gangsta's Paradise (Remix)"
- 2010: Ginuwine feat. Timbaland & Missy Elliott- "Get Involved"
- 2009: Patrice Strike – "One Day"
