= No Stress =

2008 single by Laurent Wolf

Single by Laurent Wolf

from the album Wash My World
- B-side: Remix + "Columbia"
- Released: 24 March 2008
- Genre: Electro
- Length: 3:21
- Label: Vogue, Columbia
- Songwriters: Laurent Wolf; Jeremy Hills; Éric Rima
- Producer: Laurent Wolf

Laurent Wolf singles chronology
"Another Brick" (2006)	"No Stress" (2008)	"Wash My World" (2008)

Alternative cover

"No Stress" is a 2008 song recorded by the French house record producer and DJ Laurent Wolf. It was the first single from his sixth album Wash My World, on which it features as the first track in its radio edit version, and as the tenth track in the Zen @ Acoustic version. Released in March 2008, this dance and techno song achieved a great success in many countries, including France and Belgium, where it topped the charts.

The vocals are performed by Eric Carter who is not credited as featuring on the single cover. Laurent Wolf also recorded another version of the song with Anggun for the deluxe edition of Wash My World. Wolf and Anggun performed the song at the 2008 World Music Awards in Monaco.

== Chart performance ==
In France, the single went straight to number 2 on March 29, with 4,561 sales, then topped the chart for one week with 5,209 sales, which was at the time in France the number-one single with the lowest weekly sales (this record was beaten by Britney Spears' "Womanizer" on January 10, 2009, with 3,155 sales). It remained on the chart (top 100) for 37 weeks.

"No Stress" was also a hit in Belgium (Wallonia and Flanders), where it hit number one for one week and remained on the chart for a total of 32 weeks. In Switzerland, the song had a peak at number seven and totaled 72 weeks in the top 100.

== Track listings ==
- CD single

No.	Title	Length
1.	"No Stress"	3:26

- CD maxi

No.	Title	Length
1.	"No Stress" (radio edit)	3:22
2.	"No Stress" (Anton Wick remix)	7:28
3.	"No Stress" (Ortega & Gold remix)	7:09
4.	"Columbia"	5:10

- 12" maxi

No.	Title	Length
1.	"No Stress" (original club mix)	6:59
2.	"No Stress" (Anton Wick remix)	7:28
3.	"No Stress" (Ortega & Gold remix)	7:09
4.	"No Stress" (Anton Wick elektra remix)	7:08

- Digital download

No.	Title	Length
1.	"No Stress" (Zen @ Acoustic version)	3:26
2.	"No Stress" (radio edit)	3:21
3.	"No Stress" (Anton Wick remix)	7:29
4.	"No Stress" (Ortega & Gold remix)	3:08

== Personnel ==
- Written by E.Rima, J.Hills, and L.Wolf
- Performed and produced by Laurent Wolf
- Background vocals by Éric Carter and Anggun
- Recorded at Wolf Project Studio
- Artwork by csublime.com
- Published by ATV / Sony Music Publishing France (Catalog Darkness)

== Charts and certifications ==
=== Weekly charts ===
Chart (2008–2009)	Peak position
Belgium (Ultratop 50 Flanders)	1
Belgium (Ultratop 50 Wallonia)	1
CIS Airplay (TopHit)	19
Czech Republic (IFPI)	4
Denmark (Tracklisten)	19
Europe (Eurochart Hot 100)	7
France (SNEP)	1
Hungary (Dance Top 40)	1
Hungary (Rádiós Top 40)	8
Italy (FIMI)	18
Netherlands (Dutch Top 40)	18
Netherlands (Single Top 100)	10
Russia Airplay (TopHit)	17
Slovakia Airplay (ČNS IFPI)	38
Sweden (Sverigetopplistan)	26
Switzerland (Schweizer Hitparade)	7
Turkey (Billboard)	17

=== Year-end charts ===
Chart (2008)	Position
Belgium (Ultratop Flanders)	5
Belgium (Ultratop Wallonia)	4
CIS (Tophit)	63
Europe (Eurochart Hot 100)	27
France (SNEP)	5
Hungary (Dance Top 40)	9
Hungary (Rádiós Top 40)	52
Netherlands (Dutch Top 40)	93
Netherlands (Single Top 100)	81
Russia Airplay (TopHit)	47
Switzerland (Schweizer Hitparade)	32
Chart (2009)	Position
Hungary (Dance Top 40)	26
Hungary (Rádiós Top 40)	13
Chart (2010)	Position
Russia Airplay (TopHit)	195

=== Decade-end charts ===
Decade-end chart performance for "No Stress"
Chart (2000–2009)	Position
Russia Airplay (TopHit)	156

=== Certifications ===
Country	Certification	Date	Sales certified
Belgium	Gold	July 26, 2008	20,000
France	Silver	October 23, 2008	100,000
