= Discobitch =

French band

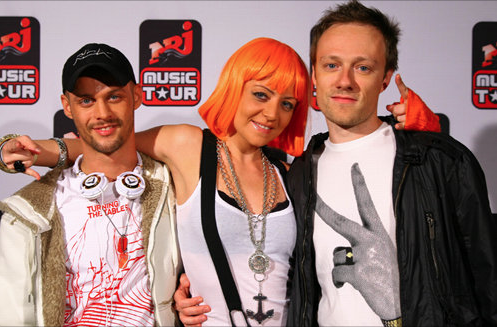

Background information
- Origin: France
- Genres: Electro house
- Years active: 2008–present
- Members: Kylian Mash; Laurent Konrad; Pauline Sampeur

Discobitch is a French electronic music project founded by Kylian Mash with Laurent Konrad.

Their first and only single, "C'est beau la bourgeoisie", was a successful club single in a number of European countries. It was number 2 in France and Belgium (Flanders), number 4 in Belgium (Wallonia), number 19 in Switzerland and number 61 in Germany. It earned a gold disc in Belgium.

== Singles ==
Year	Single	Peak positions				Certifications
Year	Single	FR	BEL (Vl)	BEL (Wa)	SUI	Certifications
2008	"C'est beau la bourgeoisie"	2	2	4	19	
