= Anges d'Afrik =

French afro-beat music collective

- Origin: Paris, France
- Genres: Afro-beat, Afro-pop, zouk, coupé-décalé, ndombolo
- Years active: 2005-present
- Members: Keva Keva; Stone Warley; Charnel Playboy; Manolo

Anges d'Afrik is a French afro-beat and afro-pop music group of Congolese origin formed in 2005 which is made up of Keva Keva, Stone Warley, Charnel Playboy and Manolo. They describe their music as Afro-pop, and their music is influenced by a mix of dance rhythms, R'n'B, African zouk, coupé-décalé and ndombolo genres.

Each member of the collective group tries to create his own personality and influences that allows the development of the sound of the band with the use of incorporating vocals, songwriting, dance steps and moves, stage arrangements, song production.

For the efficiency of the band, they play their own different roles that brings about the unity of the song group with standard musical effects.

The cooperation with Jessy Matador, at that time was adominant force in African rhythms in "Afrikan Free Style" . After they featured the vocals of Anges d'Afrik, in 2009, they released "Dorloter". Particularly in the night of the venues, followed by a large number of appearances in Paris and throughout France.

== Awards ==
The band won the award for "best house tribal song" for "Zekete zekete" during the Afrotainment Museke Awards, and Jeff Attiogbe (Togo) directing the music video for the same song was nominated for "best video director".

== Solo projects ==
The band members have been involved in their own music projects. In 2014, Stone Warley was featured in the single "Hum Connection" credited to Lee Mashup featuring Stone Warley and Co. The single became popular in French night venues and charted on SNEP, the official French Singles Chart reaching number 59.

== Discography ==
=== Singles ===
- 2009: "Dorloter"
- 2010: "Zekete zekete"
- 2012: "Danse pour moi"
- 2013: "Mata Na Yo"

featured in

- 2008: "Afrikan Free Style" (Jessy Matador feat. Anges d'Afrik) (from Jessy Matador's album Afrikan Free Style)
