= Wash My World =

Single by Laurent Wolf

from the album Wash My World
- B-side: "Remix"
- Released: August 22, 2008
- Genre: House
- Length: 3:21
- Label: Columbia
- Songwriters: Laurent Wolf; Éric Rima; Anton Wick
- Producer: Laurent Wolf

Laurent Wolf singles chronology
"No Stress" (2008)	"Wash My World" (2008)	"Seventies" (2008)

"Wash My World" is a 2008 song recorded by French DJ Laurent Wolf, and performed by Éric Carter. It was the second single from his album of the same name on which it features as second track, and was released on 22 August 2008. It was successful in France and Belgium (Wallonia) where it was a top ten hit, but was not able to reach the same success in terms of chart as the previous single, "No Stress". However, its sales in its first week were higher (6,072 sales), but the single was only number five, its peak position in France.

== Track listings ==
CD maxi

1. "Wash My World" (Radio edit) — 3:21
2. "Wash My World" (Monsieur Elle remix) — 7:04
3. "Wash My World" (Dim Chris remix) — 8:20
4. "No Stress" (Laurent Wolf vs Big Ali and DJ Snake) — 3:10

Digital download

1. "Wash My World" (Radio edit) — 3:21
2. "Wash My World" (Monsieur Elle remix) — 7:04
3. "Wash My World" (Dim Chris remix) — 8:20

== Charts ==
=== Weekly charts ===
Chart (2008–2009)	Peak position
Belgium (Ultratop 50 Flanders)	12
Belgium (Ultratop 50 Wallonia)	6
CIS Airplay (TopHit)	39
Czech Republic (Rádio – Top 100)	74
Europe (Eurochart Hot 100)	19
France (SNEP)	5
Hungary (Dance Top 40)	18
Netherlands (Dutch Top 40)	34
Russia Airplay (TopHit)	37
Slovakia (Rádio Top 100)	23
Switzerland (Schweizer Hitparade)	24

=== Year-end charts ===
Chart (2008)	Position
Belgian (Flanders) Singles Chart	66
Belgian (Wallonia) Singles Chart	59
French Airplay Chart	34
French Digital Chart	29
French Singles Chart	44
Swiss Singles Chart	93

Chart (2009)	Position
CIS (TopHit)	101
Hungary (Dance Top 40)	96
Russia Airplay (TopHit)	93
