= Makassy =

French footballer and singer (born 1984)

- Born: Alrick Kalala; 31 July 1984 (age 42); Paris, France
- Occupations: Singer; Songwriter

Alrick Kalala (born 31 July 1984) is a French footballer of Congolese origin who previously played for AS Vitré. He also developed a musical career as a singer-songwriter under the artistic name Makassy.

He released his album Tant qu'on respire in 2015 and his EP Écartez-vous in 2017. He is best known in his music career for his hit single "Doucement" that made it to the Top 20 of SNEP, the French official singles chart. A music video of the song was also released through We Made It Entertainment.

== Discography ==
=== Albums ===
Year	Album	Peak positions	Certification
Year	Album	FR	Certification
2015	Tant qu'on respire	16	

=== EPs ===
Year	Album	Peak positions	Certification
Year	Album	FR	Certification
2017	Écartez-vous	–	

=== Singles ===
Year	Title	Peak positions		Album
Year	Title	FR	BEL (Wa)	Album
2012	"Doucement"	19	20* (Ultratip)	Tant qu'on respire
2012	"Soldat"	170	–	Tant qu'on respire
2012	"Soldat"	–	23* (Ultratip)	Tant qu'on respire
2017	"Laisse tomber l'amour?"	36	–	

*Did not appear in the official Belgian Ultratop 50 charts, but rather in the bubbling under Ultratip charts.

Other appearances

- 2012: "Kwasa kwasa" (DJ Smil feat. Makassy)
- 2015: "El taxi" (Pitbull feat. Makassy & Osmani Garcia)
- 2016: "Llamame Florina" (Florina Perez feat. Makassy)
- 2016: "Dangereuse" (Willy William feat. Makassy)
