= Hum Connection =

Single by Lee Mashup featuring Stone Warley & Co
- Released: May 2014
- Recorded: 2013–2014
- Length: 3:03
- Songwriters: Anthony James; Yiorgos Bellapaisiotis
- Producers: Matt M. Ersin; Jean-François Veneziano

Stone Warley singles chronology
"Hum Connection" (2014)

Music video
- "Hum Connection" on YouTube

"Hum Connection" is a 2014 single by dancehall DJ Lee Mashup featuring Anges d'Afrik's Stone Warley. The bilingual song has lyrics in French and Lingala. Full credit of the song was "Raggatonic Présente Hum Connection by Lee Mashup featuring Stone Warley and Co.".

The single was very successful in France and Israel and various European night venues, becoming Mashup's first charting single reaching number 59 in SNEP, the official French Singles Chart.

The song was included in many compilations first being NRJ Spring Hits 2014 in April 2014. It was released as a single in May 2014.

== Charts ==
Chart (2014)	Peak position
France (SNEP)	59
