= Laurent Wolf =

French house musician (born 1970)

- Born: Laurent Debuire
- Origin: Paris, France
- Genres: House, French house, electro house
- Occupations: DJ, producer
- Instruments: Mixer, turntables, keyboards, guitars
- Years active: 1992–present
- Labels: Sony BMG
- Website: http://www.laurentwolf.com

Laurent Debuire (French pronunciation: [lɔʁɑ̃ dəbɥiʁ]; better known by his stage name Laurent Wolf, is a French electro house producer and DJ. He is the author of several compilations containing his tracks and remixes. He reached the top of the charts with his "Saxo" and "Calinda" compositions. Laurent Wolf won the DJ category in the 2008 World Music Awards and performed on the WMA 2008. The single "No Stress", featuring vocals by Éric Carter, was #1 on the French SNEP Singles Chart. On 28 October 2009, DJ Magazine announced the results of their annual Top 100 DJ Poll, with Ultra Records' Wolf placed at #66.

== Discography ==
=== Studio albums ===
Title	Details	Peak chart positions		
Title	Details	BEL	FRA	SUI
Sunshine Paradise	Release date: May 2003; Label: M10; Formats: CD	—	128	—
Afro Dynamic	Release date: November 2004; Label: Sony; Formats: CD	—	173	—
Hollyworld	Release date: 2006; Label: Vogue, Darkness; Formats: CD	—	65	—
Wash My World	Release date: 4 April 2008; Label: Vogue, Columbia; Formats: CD	43	30	83
Harmony	Release date: November 2011; Label: Vogue, M6; Formats: CD	—	43	—
"—" denotes releases that did not chart

=== Singles ===
Year	Single	Peak chart positions										Certifications (sales thresholds)	Album
Year	Single	BEL (Vl)	BEL (Wa)	CZE	DEN	FRA	ITA	NED	SUI	SVK	SWE	Certifications (sales thresholds)	Album
1998	"Respect for the French DJs"	—	—	—	—	—	—	—	—	—	—		Singles only
2001	"Octopussy"	—	—	—	—	—	—	—	—	—	—		Singles only
2002	"Saxo"	—	—	—	—	71	—	—	—	—	—		Afro Dynamic
2003	"Feel My Drums"	—	—	—	—	—	—	—	—	—	—		Afro Dynamic
2003	"Work"	—	—	—	—	—	—	—	—	—	—		Singles only
2004	"Calinda"	52	—	—	—	41	—	10	—	—	—		Singles only
2004	"Saxo Revenge" (featuring Fred Pellichero)	—	—	—	—	—	—	—	—	—	—		Afro Dynamic
2006	"Another Brick" (with Fake)	—	—	—	—	28	—	—	88	—	—		Hollyworld
2006	"It's Not Too Late" (featuring Mod Martin)	—	—	—	—	—	—	—	—	—	—		Hollyworld
2007	"Come On"	—	—	—	—	—	—	—	—	—	—		Hollyworld
2008	"No Stress"	1	1	4	19	1	18	10	7	37	26	FRA: Silver	Wash My World
2008	"Wash My World"	12	6	74	—	5	—	63	24	23	—		Wash My World
2008	"Seventies" (featuring Mod Martin)	56	43	—	—	13	—	—	—	75	—		Wash My World
2009	"Explosion"	—	63	—	—	—	—	—	—	64	—		Wash My World
2009	"Walk the Line (Remix)"	18	23	—	—	8	—	83	—	—	—		Harmony
2010	"Survive" (featuring Andrew Roachford)	—	82	—	—	9	—	—	—	10	—		Harmony
2010	"Suzy" (featuring Mod Martin)	—	42	—	—	29	—	—	—	—	—		Harmony
2011	"Love We Got" (featuring Jonathan Mendelsohn)	—	—	—	—	—	—	—	—	—	65		Harmony
2012	"Love Again" (featuring Andrew Roachford)	—	—	—	—	—	—	—	—	—	—		Harmony
2014	"Kill The Beast" (featuring Eric Carter)	—	—	—	—	—	—	—	—	—	—		Non-album single
"—" denotes releases that did not chart
