= Fresh Prince (song) =

Single by Soprano featuring Uncle Phil

from the album Cosmopolitanie
- Released: 3 November 2014
- Length: 3:19
- Label: Parlophone; Warner Music France
- Songwriters: Soprano; Vincenzo; Ludovic Carquet; Therry Marie-Louise
- Producer: LNT Muzik

Soprano singles chronology
"Cosmo" (2014)	"Fresh Prince" (2014)	"Clown" (2014)

Uncle Phil singles chronology
"Fresh Prince" (2014)

Music video
- "Fresh Prince" on YouTube

"Fresh Prince" is a song by French singer and rapper Soprano featuring Uncle Phil. It was released on 3 November 2014.

== Charts ==
=== Weekly charts ===
Weekly chart performance for "Fresh Prince"
Chart (2014–2015)	Peak position
Belgium (Ultratip Bubbling Under Flanders)	82
Belgium (Ultratop 50 Wallonia)	7
France (SNEP)	9

=== Year-end charts ===
Year-end chart performance for "Fresh Prince"
Chart (2014)	Position
France (SNEP)	88
Chart (2015)	Position
Belgium (Ultratop Wallonia)	39
France (SNEP)	63
