= DJ Sem =

Algerian DJ, songwriter, and producer

DJ Sem (born 13 January 1979), is an Algerian DJ, songwriter and producer based in Paris and specializing in world beats including R&B, hip hop, raï, house, reggaeton, and funk. He has collaborated with a great number of artists based in France particularly from ethnic backgrounds, notably Cheba Zahouania, Tunisiano, Reda Taliani, Mokobé, Lacrim, Lartiste, Mister You, Sultan, Matt Houston, Marwa Loud etc. He is signed with Universal Music France.

== Discography ==
=== Albums ===
Year	Title	Peak positions	Certifications
Year	Title	FR	Certifications
2015	Le venin musical	53	
2016	Le venin musical 2016	122	
2017	Libre comme l'air	–	
2017	Mi Corazón	69	

=== Singles ===
Year	Title	Peak positions		Album
Year	Title	FR	BEL (Wa)	Album
2016	"Ça plaisante pas" (feat. Sultan)	55	–	
2017	"Libre comme l'air" (with Lartiste and Matt Houston)	56	–	Libre comme l'air
2017	"Mi corazón" (feat. Marwa Loud)	28	28	
2018	"La Roulette" (with Inna feat. Matt Houston)	–	–	

*Did not appear in the official Belgian Ultratop 50 charts, but rather in the bubbling under Ultratip charts.
