= Nirvana (Inna album) =

2017 album by Inna

Studio album by Inna
- Released: 11 December 2017
- Genre: Pop
- Length: 37:42
- Language: English; Romanian; Spanish
- Label: Global; UMG

Inna chronology
Inna (2015)	Nirvana (2017)	Yo (2019)

Singles from Nirvana
- 1. "Gimme Gimme" Released: 1 February 2017; 2. "Ruleta" Released: 21 June 2017; 3. "Nirvana" Released: 28 November 2017

Nirvana is the fifth studio album by Romanian singer Inna. It was released on 11 December 2017 by Global Records and UMG in a partnership with supermarket chain Lidl. For this record, she collaborated with multiple producers, including Marcel Botezan, Sebastian Barac, Thomas Troelsen, Alex Cotoi and Vlad Lucan. It was entirely recorded at the studios of Global Records in Bucharest, Romania. Nirvana has been described as a pop album, with influences varying from electronic dance music (EDM), reggaeton and R&B to Latin, club and tropical music.

Upon its release, the album received positive reviews from music critics, who commended that Inna showcased her versatility as an artist, but noted the songs lacked innovation and were similar to her past material. To promote Nirvana, three singles, "Gimme Gimme", "Ruleta", and "Nirvana", preceded the record in 2017, to commercial success in some European countries. "Ruleta" notably reached number three in Romania. The album itself failed to impact any country's charts.

== Background and release ==
In April 2017, it was announced that Inna was working with Spanish disc jockey Sak Noel, who had previously remixed her single "Gimme Gimme". Publications also reported that the singer was working on an upcoming fifth studio album with producer David Ciente and Romanian singer and songwriter Irina Rimes, respectively. On 23 November 2017, the record's title and its cover were unveiled during an Instagram post on Inna's account. During a post on her blog, Inna explained the record's name: "Nirvana for me has a very simple meaning. It means 'cool', cause my new album is reeeeally cool! [...] My Nirvana is my family and my team, [...] when I perform on the stage and I see your happy faces, [...] [and] music and making people happy. My hope for this album is to help you find joy and peace of mind in this chaos called life. Even if just a little bit! That is Nirvana!"

Producers on Nirvana include Marcel Botezan, Sebastian Barac, Thomas Troelsen, Alex Cotoi and Vlad Lucan; it was entirely recorded in the studios of Global Records in Bucharest, Romania. The tracklist of the album was revealed via Facebook on 27 November 2017. Nirvana was released in Romania on 11 December 2017 by Global Records and UMG, in a partnership with supermarket chain Lidl. The album's Japanese release followed in September 2018, also containing Inna's collaboration with Alexandra Stan and Daddy Yankee on "We Wanna" (2015). Three years after the album's release, Inna uploaded a deluxe edition to her SoundCloud on 10 December 2020, further containing the previously unincluded singles "Heaven" (2016) and "No Help" (2018), as well as the promotional single "Say It With Your Body" (2016).

== Composition ==
"Ruleta"
A 19-second sample of "Ruleta", an EDM and reggaeton-influenced song with Indian and Caribbean touches.

Nirvana is a pop album; it opens with Inna's collaboration with Romanian singer Erik on "Ruleta", which is an English and Spanish language EDM and reggaeton-influenced song with touches of Indian and Caribbean music. The second track "Gimme Gimme" is a Bollywood, Indian and Gypsy-inspired pop track. A sample of British group Touch and Go's "Would You...?" (1998) is used during "My Dreams". "Tropical", Nirvana's fourth track, features a trumpet in its instrumentation along with uncredited male reggae vocals; Jonathan Currinn of CelebMix identified the song as one of the album's highlights.

Parts of tropical pop song "Hands Up" showcase Inna's falsetto voice, and its love-themed lyrics contain various metaphors, while "Nirvana" is a Latin-inspired club recording, featuring a portion of rap delivered in Spanish during its drop. R&B-influenced "Don't Mind" features lyrics in both English and Spanish language, and is followed by "Lights", which is influenced by African music. Currinn wrote that the song allowed Inna to showcase her versatility as an artist. He compared "Lights" to Romanian recording artist Alexandra Stan's "La Fuega" from her third studio album Alesta (2016), writing: "[it] is going to be a Marmite track; some people will love it, some people are going to hate it." Raluca Chirilă from InfoMusic considered the track for a standalone single release. Nirvana ends with tropical pop song "Dream About the Ocean", which "has an oceanic wave style to it" and whose lyrics deal with self confidence, and Romanian language ballads "Nota de plată", "Cum ar fi?" and "Tu și eu".

== Reception ==
Music critics were positive to mixed towards the album. Currinn of CelebMix gave a positive review of Nirvana, and thought that "each track is amazing but different in itself". He went on comparing album track "Hands Up" to "Endless" (2011), "Nirvana" to "Bop Bop" (2015) and "Heaven" (2016), "Don't Mind" to material from Barbadian singer Rihanna' catalog, and "Dream About the Ocean" to Inna's "Walking on the Sun" from her 2015 eponymous studio album. Currinn praised the majority of the record's material as highlights, concluding: "This whole album is a great collection of tracks, that truly show off Inna's versatility as an artist. She truly stuns everyone." An editor of French website Just Focus praised the album's singles and selected tracks, although criticizing the lack of originality of other songs. They wrote: "The rest is truly the recycled Inna dance sound without any originality. This is the time to evolve, as most artists do now, including Lady Gaga, Rihanna, Kesha etc... Inna's music will always be welcome but the use of the same formula is not enough, especially in a current period in which artists are focusing more on innovation."

== Promotion ==
Three singles preceded Nirvana in 2017 ("Gimme Gimme", "Ruleta", and "Nirvana") to commercial success in Europe including Romania and Turkey. "Ruleta" notably peaked at number three in her native country, at number one in Lithuania, and at number five in Turkey. Both "Gimme Gimme" and "Nirvana" reached the top 20 in Romania, and the top ten in Turkey. Inna has further been featured on the 2017 tracks "Tu și eu" by Carla's Dreams, and "Nota de plată" by The Motans, which are also included on Nirvana, alongside 2016 promotional single "Cum ar fi?". The aforementioned releases all reached the top 60 in Romania. The songs "Don't Mind", "Tropical", "Hands Up", "My Dreams, "Dream About the Ocean" and "Lights" were made available for digital download as promotional singles in December 2017.

== Track listing ==
Nirvana – Standard version
No.	Title	Lyrics	Music	Length
1.	"Ruleta" (featuring Erik)	Elena Alexandra Apostoleanu; Erik Tchatchoua; Breyan Isaac; Marius Dia	Sebastian Barac; Marcel Botezan; David Ciente	3:18
2.	"Gimme Gimme"	Apostoleanu; Isaac; Elena Luminița Vasile	Barac; Botezan; Ciente	2:57
3.	"My Dreams"	Thomas Troelsen; Ali Tamposi; Sam Martin	Vlad-Octavian Lucan; James Neil Lynch; Martin; Alexander Graham; Patrick Wills Fleming; Thomas Troelsen; David Lowe; Tamposi	3:11
4.	"Tropical"	Rico Greene; Anouk Hendriks	Mo Alitou; Joel MacDonald	3:14
5.	"Hands Up"	Annalisa Morelli; Alina Smith	Barac; Botezan; Jens Siversted; Jonas Wallin; Noonie Bao; Wyclef Jean	3:04
6.	"Nirvana"	Apostoleanu; Troelsen	Barac; Botezan; Ciente; Lucan; Troelsen	3:14
7.	"Don't Mind"	Apostoleanu; Isaac	Barac; Botezan; Ciente	3:14
8.	"Lights"	Apostoleanu; Paris Jones	Ciente; Barac; Botezan	2:33
9.	"Dream About the Ocean"	Apostoleanu; Luisa-Ionela Luca	Costantin Bodea; Alexandru Cotoi; Luca	3:12
10.	"Nota de plată" (The Motans featuring Inna)	Irina Rimes; Denis Roabeș	Rimes; Roables; Damian Rusu; Cotoi; Bodea	3:15
11.	"Cum ar fi?"	Apostoleanu; Rimes	Cotoi; Constantin Sava	3:19
12.	"Tu și eu" (Carla's Dreams featuring Inna)	Carla's Dreams; Cotoi	Carla's Dreams; Cotoi	3:11

Japanese bonus tracks
No.	Title	Writer(s)	Producer(s)	Length
10.	"We Wanna" (with Alexandra Stan featuring Daddy Yankee)	Andreas Schuller; Jacob Luttrell; Troelsen; Ramon Ayala	Schuller; Troelsen	3:53
11.	"Ruleta" (Depierro Remix)			3:20
12.	"Nirvana" (Asher Remix)			3:39

Deluxe edition bonus tracks
No.	Title	Length
13.	"Heaven"	3:28
14.	"Say It With Your Body"	3:02
15.	"No Help"	3:03

Sample credits

- "My Dreams" contains elements from the Touch and Go recording "Would You...?" written by David Lowe and produced by Lowe and Phil Cross.

== Release history ==
Region	Date	Format	Label
Romania	11 December 2017	CD	Global/ UMG
Various	11 December 2017	Digital download	Global
Japan	26 September 2018	Digital download	Global
