= Me Gusta (Inna song) =

Single by Inna
- Released: 14 February 2018
- Genre: Dance-pop; electropop; EDM
- Length: 3:54
- Label: Roton; Empire
- Songwriter: Elena Alexandra Apostoleanu
- Producer: David Ciente

Inna singles chronology
"Nirvana" (2017)	"Me Gusta" (2018)	"Pentru că" (2018)

"Me Gusta" (English: "I Like") is a song recorded by Romanian singer Inna. Written by Inna and produced by David Ciente, the track was released for digital download and streaming on 14 February 2018 by Roton and Empire Music Management. "Me Gusta" is a Spanish language song, featuring an electronic production and beat drops. A reviewer noted an Asian sound. Lyrically, Inna admires a man's presence and dance abilities.

Music critics were positive towards "Me Gusta", praising its production and catchiness, and predicting its commercial success. An accompanying music video for the song was uploaded onto Inna's official YouTube channel on 13 February 2018 to positive response. Shot by Barna Nemethi, it shows Inna performing to the track on streets of Bucharest and Barcelona. Prior to the single's release, Inna sang "Me Gusta" on Romanian radio station Radio ZU. Commercially, it peaked at number 89 in Romania.

== Background and release ==
"Me Gusta"
A 24-second sample of "Me Gusta", a Spanish language song featuring an electronic production and beat drops along with an Asian sound.

"Me Gusta" was solely written by Inna, while production was handled by David Ciente. The singer previously worked with Ciente on "Gimme Gimme" (2017) and "Ruleta" (2017). It is a Spanish language song, featuring an electronic production and beat drops; David Moreno of 20 minutos wrote that "Me Gusta" was influenced by Asian music. Lyrically, the track's lyrics revolve around "Inna lik[ing] this guy when he's dancing, and she hasn't felt this way about him for some time, and that his dancing always cheers her up", as noted by a reviewer.

"Me Gusta" was digitally made available as a single on 14 February 2018 (Valentine's Day) by Roton and Empire Music Management. Fans and publications originally expected it to be released before "Ruleta", due to a live performance for radio station Radio ZU in April 2017.

== Critical reception ==
Music critics gave generally positive reviews of "Me Gusta". Europa FM pointed out the summery nature and catchiness of the song, while Filip Stan of România TV predicted its commercial success. Jonathan Currinn, writing for CelebMix, praised the track's lyrics: "These lyrics are chant-worthy from start to finish and it makes every single listener wish they could sing this song at the top of their lungs." Kevin Apaza, writing for Direct Lyrics, praised "Me Gusta"'s production, drops and "summery, festive" vibe, but slightly criticized its composition. He further suggested that the track should have been released during the summer season to fit its message. Although he did not entirely enjoy the song at the first listen, Moreno of 20 minutos lauded its sound and the singer's "impertinent" voice and noted the track's "warmth".

== Music video ==
An accompanying music video for "Me Gusta" was uploaded to Inna's official YouTube channel on 13 February 2018. It was filmed in Bucharest, Romania and Barcelona, Spain by Barna Nemethi, whom the singer had previously collaborated with on the visuals for "Good Time" (2014), "Yalla" (2016) and "Ruleta". Marius Apopei and John Perez were credited as the clip's directors of photography, while Anca Buldur and Adonis Enache performed make-up and hair styling. Clothes were procured by RDStyling, including pride platform shoes and an animal print waistcoat.

Reviewers gave positive reviews of the clip. Direct Lyrics's Apaza praised its summery vibe and described its plot: "The visual sees the Romanian pop singer spending the day in a coastal town by the port, the beach promenade, and wandering throughout some picturesque streets." Currinn from CelebMix wrote: "Considering the content of the lyrics, we could have only hoped for a full-on choreography dance music video, instead we got Inna's typical sultry and sexy visual where she lets loose and has some fun in front of the camera." Currinn further praised the clip's styling and fashion, and saw it as a response to critics directed at Inna's weight gain. 24 hours after its release, the music video gathered nearly one million views on YouTube, followed by two million in four days.

== Track listing ==
Digital download
No.	Title	Length
1.	"Me Gusta"	3:54

== Credits and personnel ==
Credits adapted from InfoMusic and YabbMusic.

Composing and technical credits

- Elena Alexandra Apostoleanu – lead vocals, composer
- David Ciente – producer

Visual credits

- Marius Apopei – director of photography
- Anca Buldur – make-up
- Adonis Enache – hair styling
- Barna Nemethi – music video director
- John Perez – director of photography
- RDStyling – clothes prosecutor

== Charts ==
Chart (2018)	Position
Romania (Airplay 100)	89

== Release history ==
Territory	Date	Format(s)	Label
Various	14 February 2018	Digital download; streaming	Roton/ Empire
