= Nirvana (Inna song) =

Single by Inna

from the album Nirvana
- Released: 28 November 2017
- Genre: Club
- Length: 3:14
- Label: Global
- Songwriters: Elena Alexandru Apostoleanu; Thomas Troelsen
- Producers: Sebastian Barac; Marcel Botezan; David Ciente; Vlad Lucan; Troelsen

Inna singles chronology
"Ruleta" (2017)	"Nirvana" (2017)	"Me Gusta" (2018)

"Nirvana" is a song recorded by Romanian singer Inna for her fifth studio album of the same name (2017). It was made available for digital download on 28 November 2017 by Global Records, as the record's third single. The track was written by Inna and Thomas Troelsen, while production was handled by Sebastian Barac, Marcel Botezan, David Ciente, Vlad Lucan and Troelsen. Musically, "Nirvana" is a Latin-influenced club song, featuring a rap delivered in Spanish during its drop.

Music critics were generally positive towards the dance nature of "Nirvana", and predicted its commercial success, although some felt it was inferior to her previous work. An accompanying music video was uploaded onto Inna's official YouTube channel simultaneously with the single's release to positive response from reviewers. Shot by Bogdan Păun of production team NGM Creative, the clip was noted to have no plot. It makes use of neon lighting and features Inna wearing outfits from different brands. For further promotion, the singer performed "Nirvana" for native radio stations and appeared on Vocea României. Commercially, the single reached the top three in Romania and Serbia and the top ten in Turkey.

== Background and composition ==
"Nirvana"
A 25-second sample of "Nirvana", a club song. Its structure features a drop which consists of a rap portion delivered in Spanish.

"Nirvana" was written by Inna and Thomas Troelsen, while production was handled by Sebastian Barac, Marcel Botezan, David Ciente, Vlad Lucan and Troelsen. It was released for digital download as the third single from her fifth studio album of the same name (2017) on 28 November 2017 by Global Records.

Musically, it is a club song. Its drop features a rap portion delivered in Spanish, while lyrically, Inna "miss[es] her lover being on her body". It commences with the lyrics "Boom boom, contigo te hace", while other lines include "Nine one one, I'm on fire", "Smoking Nirvana / Ring the ala-the-la-larm / Smoking Nirvana / Come on ring the ala-la-la-larm" and "Pues sabes que tu corazón conmigo, Hace boom boom contigo". Jonathan Currinn from website CelebMix noticed the inclusion of a post-chorus, comparing its structure to Inna's "Heaven" (2016), "Ruleta" (2017) and "Bop Bop" (2015). Pure Charts's Julien Goncalves thought that Inna "continues to surf on the craze of the Latin culture [...] on a sensual and feverish tempo", while Valentin Malfroy of French website Aficia noticed a similar production to its predecessor. The singer herself said "[the song] gives [her] a good mood, it is energetic [and] fresh."

== Critical reception ==
Upon its release, "Nirvana" was met with positive reviews from music critics. Kevin Apaza from Direct Lyrics praised the song and its drop as "feel-good", "sexy" and "party-ready", although naming it inferior to Inna's past singles including "Hot" (2008), "10 Minutes" (2010) and "Cola Song" (2014). David Watt, writing for British portal All-Noise, predicted the commercial success of "Nirvana": "[...] it’s a surefire hit."; Aficia's Malfroy also noted its hit potential. Pure Charts's Goncalves wrote: "That's good, 'Nirvana' is a bomb where desire shows through every note".

== Music video ==
A screenshot of a scene in the music video of "Nirvana", portraying Inna in a gold box accompanied by two women with their arms out. A critic interpreted it as Egypt-inspired.

An accompanying music video for "Nirvana" was uploaded onto Inna's official YouTube channel simultaneously with the single's release on 28 November, preceded by the premiere of two teasers on 24 November and 27 November 2017. Production team NGM Creative was hired for the shooting, of which Bogdan Păun was credited as the director and Alexandru Mureșan as the director of photography of the clip. RD Styling procured Inna's outfits from brands including Alexandru Simedru, Trashkin, Vetements, Off White and Balenciaga. Hair styling was done by Make-up and Beauty Studio, and Endorphin Lab. Direct Lyrics noted that the music video "doesn’t have much storyline-wise".

The visual opens with Inna walking through a hallway full of background dancers, sporting an outfit similar to the one wore in her previous music video for "Ruleta", consisting of animal print-designed shorts and overcoat with black boots. She then reaches a room with multiple people, watching two women eating and drinking; product placement of Coca-Cola is also incorporated in the scene. Other scenes include Inna "lounging around dressed in a teal outfit" and her in a gold box accompanied by two women with their arms out. The clip continues in a similar way and ends with Inna staring at a camera in a blue dress. Nearly all scenes make use of neon lighting, with cut shots showing her dancers performing choreography, and the singer singing to the song against multiple backdrops.

The visual was generally viewed positively by reviewers. Direct Lyrics's Apaza wrote: "The music video [...] [is] filled with light effects, dancing, and beauty shots from Inna, and all of this is exactly what a song like 'Nirvana' needed, and not anything else. Inna’s music is all about having a good time, and freeing your mind. So this music video is more than adequate." Son Güncelleme of Turkish newspaper Vatan found that the clip "stands out with its special costumes and make-up [...]", while Aficia's Malfroy compared it to Inna's visual for "In Your Eyes" (2013). Currinn from CelebMix labelled the clip as a mixture between Inna's own "Club Rocker" (2011) and G Girls' "Call the Police" (2016) videos, further saying: "The song has hidden depths which the music video relates to well." He also commented on the shot featuring a gold box: "It has an Egyptian-feel to [it], although we feel this distracts us from the main visuals." Watt of All-Noise found the clip enjoyable, although calling it imperfect, and noticing that "Inna didn't put a lot of heart or money in the music video. It's evident since the video is a simple low-budget MV."

== Live performances ==
Inna performed the song live on the seventh season of Romanian reality singing competition Vocea României on 8 December 2017, along with "Ruleta". She also appeared on Romanian radio station Kiss FM to sing the song four days later. Inna was accompanied by male background dancers and standing in a circulating light pyramid. Currinn thought that the performance was "outstanding", while writing: "We love it when an artist brings a new and incredible live performance, and Inna sure has done that. [T]his is like no other performance you have ever seen." Inna was also scheduled to sing the song for native radio station Pro FM, but her performance was cancelled due to her cold. On 20 December 2017, the singer uploaded a video on YouTube of her performing to the song with her background dancers while walking through the building of Virgin Radio Romania, as well as delivering a stripped-down performance of "Nirvana" there.

== Track listing ==
- Digital download
1. "Nirvana" – 3:14

== Charts ==
=== Weekly charts ===
Chart (2017–2018)	Peak position
Romania (Airplay 100)	2
Romania Radio Songs (Media Forest)	3
Romania TV Airplay (Media Forest)	3
Turkey (Number One Top 40)	7

=== Year-end charts ===
Chart (2018)	Position
Romania (Airplay 100)	22

== Release history ==
Territory	Date	Format(s)	Label
Various	28 November 2017	Digital download	Global
Italy	9 February 2018	Radio airplay	CDF
