= Ruleta (Inna song) =

Single by Inna featuring Erik

from the album Nirvana
- Released: 21 June 2017
- Length: 3:18
- Label: Global
- Songwriter(s): Elena Alexandra Apostoleanu; Marius Dia; Breyan Isaac; Erik Tchatchoua
- Producer(s): Sebastian Barac; Marcel Botezan; David Ciente

Inna singles chronology
"Gimme Gimme" (2017)	"Ruleta" (2017)	"Nirvana" (2017)

"Ruleta" (English: "Roulette") is a song recorded by Romanian singer Inna, featuring collaborative vocals by Romanian performer Erik, for her fifth studio album, Nirvana (2017). It was made available for digital download and streaming on 21 June 2017 by Global Records as the album's second single. The track was written by Inna, Erik, Marius Dia and Breyan Isaac, while production was handled by Sebastian Barac, Marcel Botezan and David Ciente. "Ruleta" features lyrics in English and Spanish. It is an EDM and reggaeton-influenced song, with touches of Indian and Caribbean music.

Music critics were positive towards the recording, praising its summery style and noting its commercial appeal. An accompanying music video for "Ruleta" was shot by Barna Nemethi at the Domeniul Greaca resort in Romania. It mainly portrays Inna and other people dancing to the song at a tennis court. Uploaded onto the singer's YouTube channel simultaneously with the single's release, it became trending on the platform worldwide. Commercially, the song reached the top five in Romania, Bulgaria and Turkey.

== Background and composition ==
"Ruleta"
A 19-second sample of "Ruleta", an EDM and reggaeton-influenced song with Indian and Caribbean touches.

"Ruleta" was written by Inna, Erik, Marius Dia and Breyan Isaac, while production was handled by Sebastian Barac, Marcel Botezan and David Ciente. The track features lyrics in both English and Spanish language; some of them include: "Una vida ganaste en la ruleta, con tu movimiento gáname". Originally, the single release of "Me Gusta" was expected by Jonathan Currinn of CelebMix, with the singer performing it live for Romanian radio station Radio ZU in April 2017. However, "Ruleta" was made available for digital download and streaming on 21 June 2017 by Global Records instead. Musically, it is an EDM and reggaeton-influenced track, containing touches of Indian and Caribbean music. When asked by a Direct Lyrics interviewer to describe the lyrics and sound of "Ruleta", Inna said, "It's summerish, it's cool, it's fun and I dare to say... it's catchy and addictive!"

== Reception ==
Upon its release, "Ruleta" received positive reviews from music critics. Currinn from CelebMix wrote, "this new song has Inna proving that she's multilingual", and compared the style of "Ruleta" to her "Heaven" (2016). Kevin Apaza, writing for Direct Lyrics thought, "summer doesn't officially start until Romanian pop queen Inna releases her summer single", further calling it "brilliant" and "club-ready". An editor of Bihoreanul praised the "attractive" rhythms of "Ruleta" and noted its potential commercial success in Romania.

Commercially, the song debuted at number 32 on Romania's Airplay 100 for the week ending 9 July 2017 as the highest new entry, marking one of Inna's highest debuts on the chart. In late August 2017, "Ruleta" reached its peak position at number three, becoming the singer's highest-charting single since "Bop Bop" (2015), which peaked at number two. The track also opened at number 39 on the French Club 40 chart for the week ending 15 July 2017 and rose up to number 26 on the following week. "Ruleta" further charted in other countries, most notably reaching number two in Bulgaria, and number 45 in Spain.

== Music video ==
An accompanying music video for "Ruleta" was shot at the Domeniul Greaca resort in Romania by Barna Nemethi, with Marius Apopei serving as the director of photography. Inna recalled the experience, "Actually, I was super chill in that day, super relaxed, just going with the flow. Most of the times, I'm kind of stressed out, because I want everything to be perfect. Not too many funny stuff, just having fun."

The clip was uploaded onto her official YouTube channel on 21 June 2017, where it gathered over seven million views in one week, and later 11 million views in 11 days. The video thus became trending on the platform in Romania, Austria, Israel, Lithuania, Bulgaria, Denmark, Germany, Switzerland, Spain, Turkey, Norway, Finland, Ireland, Russia, Mexico, Italy, France, Venezuela, Canada, Peru, Ecuador and Chile. The visual features the singer and a huge crowd of background dancers and other people performing to the song at a tennis court, a night bar, a pool and around a bonfire. Inna wears a white hoodie along with an animal print waistcoat, while Erik also makes appearance sporting a yellow-blue jacket, black shorts and sunglasses. Alex Stănescu from InfoMusic called the music video "summery".

== Live performances and other usage ==
To promote the single, Inna and Erick performed a stripped-down version at Romanian radio stations Kiss FM and Radio ZU on 30 June 2017. Both performances had the same concept, featuring them singing, interspersed with background dancers and two children performing choreography during instrumental parts. Currinn from CelebMix applauded the appearances for Inna's vocal delivery, the singers' chemistry and the dance breaks. Another performance followed on Pro FM in late July 2017, as well as on O Ses Türkiye in December 2018. For Romanian reality talent show Te cunosc de undeva!, Lidia Buble impersonated Inna and delivered a performance of "Ruleta". On 8 December 2017, Inna made an appearance on the seventh season of Romanian reality singing competition Vocea României to perform the song along with "Nirvana" (2017). An alternative version of the song titled "La roulette" was released in February 2018, featuring French disc jockey DJ Sem and French singer Matt Houston. This version was registered on the Wallonian Ultratip chart.

== Track listing ==
- Digital download
1. "Ruleta" (featuring Erick) – 3:18

== Credits and personnel ==
Credits adapted from Adevărul.

- Elena Alexandra Apostoleanu – lead vocals, composer
- Erik Tchatchoua – featured artist, composer
- Sebastian Barac – producer
- Marcel Botezan – producer
- David Ciente – producer
- Marius Dia – composer
- Breyan Isaac – composer

== Charts ==
=== Weekly charts ===
Weekly chart performance for "Ruleta"
Chart (2017)	Peak position
Bulgaria Airplay (PROPHON)	2
Croatia International Airplay (Top lista)	50
France (Club 40)	26
Germany (Deutsche Black Charts)	21
Romania (Airplay 100)	3
Romania Radio Songs (Media Forest)	9
Romania TV Airplay (Media Forest)	1
Slovakia (Rádio Top 100)	27
Spain (PROMUSICAE)	45
Turkey (Number One Top 40)	5

=== Year-end charts ===
Year-end chart performance for "Ruleta"
Chart (2017)	Position
Romania (Airplay 100)	30

== Release history ==
Release history for "Ruleta"
Region	Date	Format	Label
Various	21 June 2017	Streaming	Global
Various	21 June 2017	Digital download	Global

== See also ==
- List of music released by Romanian artists that has charted in major music markets
