= Gorchitza =

Ukrainian electronic music band

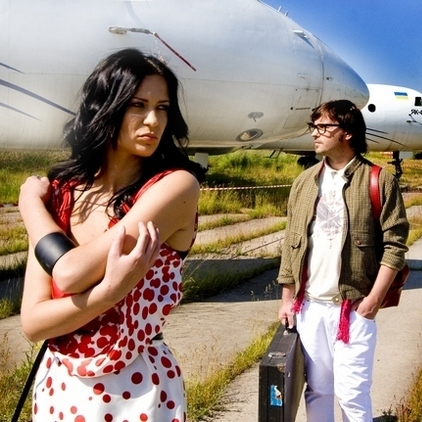

Background information
- Origin: Kyiv, Ukraine
- Genres: Electronic, dance-rock, funky house
- Years active: 2006–2014, 2020–present
- Labels: IKON, Lavina Music
- Members: Oleksii Laptev
- Past members: Alloise (Alla Moskovka)

Gorchitza (lit. 'Mustard') is a Ukrainian electronic music band from Kyiv. The group performs in English.

== History ==
=== 2003–2007: Formation and first single ===
Before Gorchitza, Oleksii Laptev was in a band of the same name. In 2003, that group placed second in the Ukrainian musical contest "Better Together" (ukr. Краще Разом).

After that group disbanded, Laptev planned a new project. While working as a sound engineer at a radio station in Kerch, he experimented with synthesizers. This influenced Gorchitza's electronic sound.

Laptev met Alla Moskovka (stage name Alloise) at a nightclub where she was performing as a house vocalist. He recruited Moskovka, and they remained the permanent members until 2012. Other musicians supported them for collaborations and live shows. Due to a shared interest in English-language music, they wrote songs exclusively in English.

Gorchitza performed for the first time at the Kyiv nightclub Kaif on October 6, 2006. In 2007, the band released their debut single, "Kiss Me Loneliness," which received airplay on Ukrainian radio. Later that year, they released "One New Message". The track received international attention when the British band Apollo 440 remixed it.

=== 2008–2012: International recognition and Alloise's departure ===
In 2008, Gorchitza signed with the label Lavina Music and released their first studio album, Highlights. That year, the band was selected as one of fifteen competitors to represent Ukraine at the Sopot International Song Festival from approximately 5,000 applicants. Although they did not win, they signed with EMI Music Poland for distribution outside Ukraine.

In August 2009, Gorchitza performed in Russia for the first time at the NuNote Lounge Fest in Moscow. In 2010, Nokia released a limited-edition series of mobile phones pre-loaded with Gorchitza's music. That year, the band released the singles "Last Time" and "Final Cut". These appeared on their second album, It's You, released via Lavina Music in 2011.

Alloise left Gorchitza the following year to pursue a solo career. Her final show with the band was on 7 April 2012. In an interview with Marie Claire, Alloise stated that her departure briefly strained her relationship with Laptev, though they reconciled in 2013. Vocalist Olya Dibrova replaced Alloise, and Kenyan-born singer Godwin Kiwinda also joined the group.

=== 2012–present: Later activities ===
Gorchitza continued performing live after the lineup change, including a set at the American Chamber of Commerce in Ukraine's Independence Day Picnic in July 2012. The band became inactive in 2014, and Dibrova left for a solo career.

In 2020, Gorchitza returned with a new song, "Shkoura". Since then, the band has released singles and toured but has not released a studio album. Oleksii Laptev remains the only permanent member.

== Band members ==
Current members

- Oleksii Gorchitza (Oleksii Laptev) — frontman, keyboards, programming (2007–2014, 2020–present)

Former members

- Alloise — lead vocals, lyrics (2007–2012, 2017)
- Olya Dibrova — vocals, lyrics (2012–2014)
- Godwin Kiwinda — vocals
- Alexey Kyrychenko — guitar
- Artem Ugodnikov — drums
- Oleg Kuzmenko — drums
- Yaroslav Polishchuk — bass guitar
- Alexey Molchanov — drums

== Discography ==
=== Albums ===
- Highlights (2008)
- Neytrino (2008) — Oleksii Laptev solo album
- Highlights RMXS (2008) — remix album
- It's You (2011)

=== Singles ===
- From Highlights (2008): "Kiss Me Loneliness" (2007), "One New Message" (2007), "Call It A Dream" (2009)
- From It's You (2011): "Last Time" (2010), "Final Cut" (2010)
