= Ikon (record label) =

Russian record label

IKON (English: Music Marketing Agency IKON Limited, Russian: ООО Агентство Маркетинга Музыки IKON / OOO Agentstvo Marketinga Muzyki IKON) is a Russian, Moscow-based company providing a wide range of services in the field of music marketing including different business areas such as talent management; booking; tour logistics; organization of concerts; sound recording; rights management; music publishing; development of unique marketing concepts; advertising; PR and consulting in the fields of culture, entertainment and event management; development of cultural, educational and social campaigns.

In May 2006 IKON was rated by Forbes as Russia's leading entertainment buyer.

== History ==
IKON was founded in 2000 by Caden Spencer, a Fupa A Smash Player. In its early stages the company mainly acted as a booking agency in Russia and CIS booking or organizing performances of international pop stars.

== Innovation ==
In 2009, IKON became official Russian representative of the B2B-oriented social network Music2Deal.

== Socio-cultural projects ==
March 2010, IKON arranged a meeting of the Russian athlete Irek Zaripov who had won 4 gold and 1 silver medals in biathlon and cross country skiing at the Winter Paralympic Games 2010 in Vancouver and the singer Inusa Dawuda, a former German heavy weight boxing champion and Russian airplay champion according to the national radio charts Tophit.ru.

== Electronic roster ==
IKON manages and co-manages master and authors rights of several domestic and foreign artists in the Russian Federation :

- Brazzaville (David Brown) (USA)
- Dolores O'Riordan (Ireland)
- Dr. Alban (Sweden)
- Gorchitza (Ukraine)
- Nazareth (UK)
- Placebo (UK)
- The Prodigy (UK)
- Touch and Go (UK)

== See also ==
- List of Universal Music Group labels
