= Touch and Go (band) =

British jazz pop band

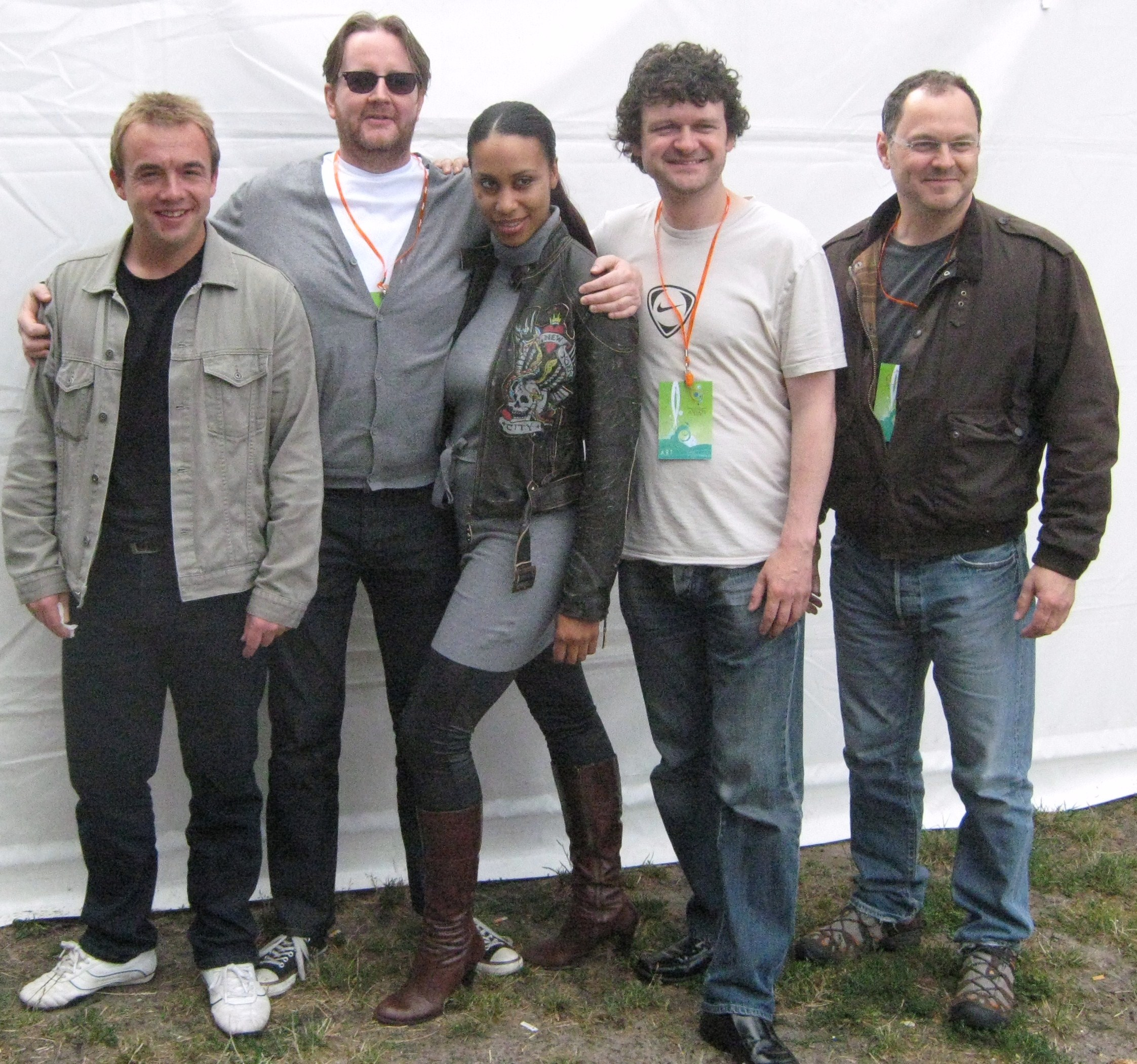

Background information
- Origin: London, England
- Genres: Jazz pop
- Years active: 1998–present
- Labels: Oval, V2
- Members: Vanessa Lancaster; James Lynch; David Lowe; Gordon Nelki
- Website: www.touch-and-go.net, discontinued

Touch and Go is a British jazz pop ensemble founded in 1998, whose most famous hit was "Would You...?", released in October of the same year as a single and later included in the band's debut album I Find You Very Attractive, which was released in 1999. Other songs from the same album were "Straight to... Number One", "So Hot", and "Tango in Harlem".

== Music career ==
In October 1998, "Would You...?", a track marked by its distinctive sampling of a woman's voice saying "I've noticed you around / I find you very attractive / Would you go to bed with me?", reached number 3 in the UK Singles Chart. It became a hit in Europe, particularly in Eastern Europe where the ensemble toured extensively. "Would You...?" has been included on such television show soundtracks as the American G String Divas and the British series As If. The track has also been sampled for San Pellegrino, Carlsberg, and Nokia advertisements. It was played in Miss World 1998 during the runway pass of a group of contestants, and also in Miss Universe 2002, this last one a different version of the song during the swimsuit competition. The lyrics were inspired by questions originally used as part of a psychological study conducted in 1978 by Elaine Hatfield and Russell D. Clark.

"Straight... to Number One" was also featured in some advertisements, including one for Apple Computer's iTunes. The song was also featured in the first season of the American version of Queer As Folk.

Touch and Go were popular in Eastern Europe, especially in Russia, playing some fifty concerts a year. Since 2003, they travelled all major cities in Russia and ex-USSR countries from Moscow to Vladivostok. The band was represented in the region by IKON exclusively.

Their record producer, David Lowe, is the composer of all BBC News music since 1998.

On 13 November 2011, they appeared as musical guests on X Factor (Romania).

== Ensemble ==
=== Members ===
- Vanessa Lancaster – vocals
- James Lynch – trumpet, instruments

=== Producers ===
- David Lowe
- Gordon Nelki

== Discography ==
=== Albums ===
- I Find You Very Attractive (1999)

=== Singles ===
- "Would You...?" (1998) - UK No. 3; Canada No. 64
- "Straight... to Number One" (1999)
- "So Hot" (2000)
- "Tango in Harlem" (2001)
