= Alloise =

Ukrainian singer (born 1984)

- Алла Євгенівна Московка
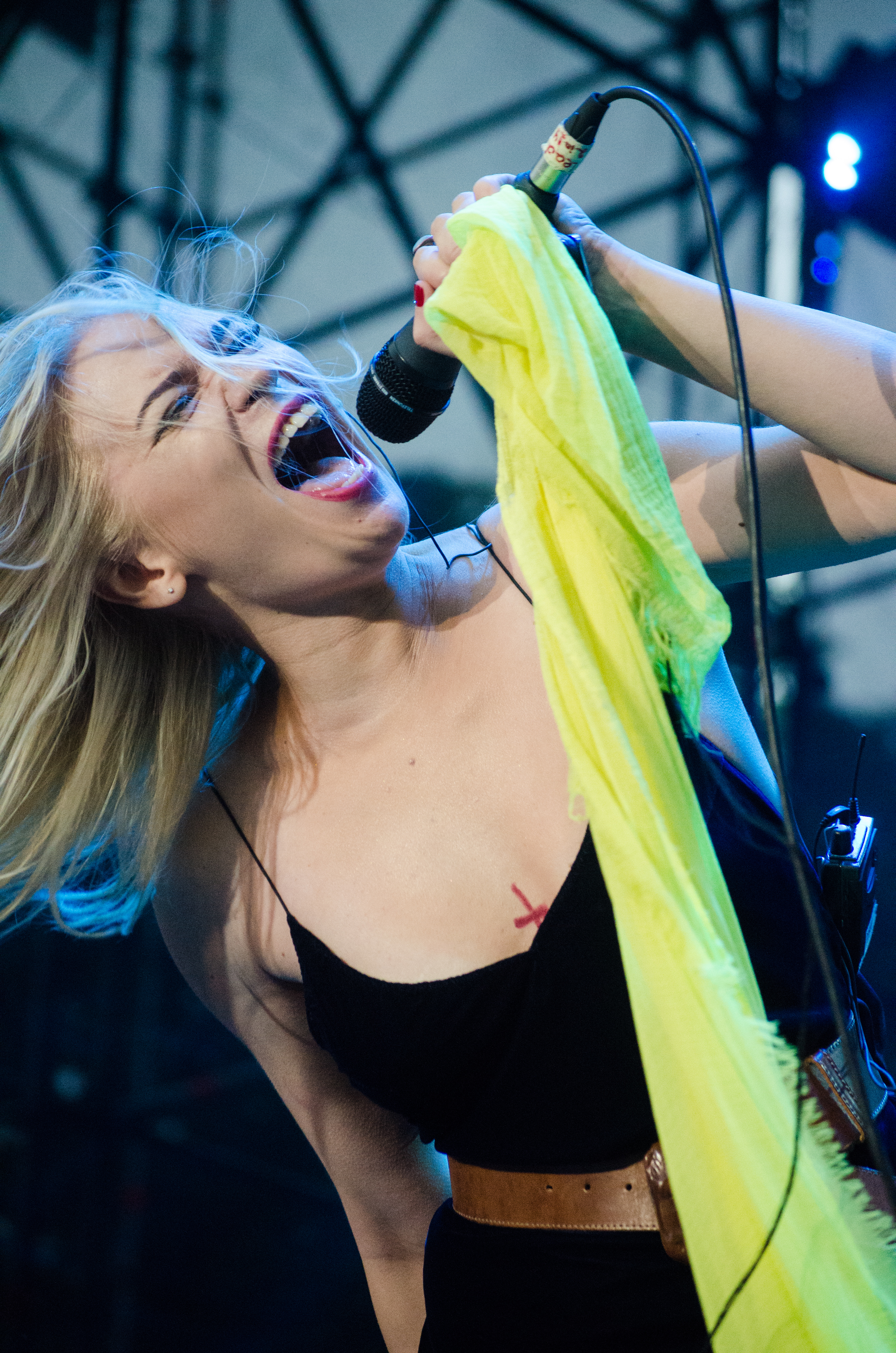
- Alloise at the 2016 Atlas Festival
- Born: Alla Jevhenivna Moskovka; 19 October 1984 (age 42); Poltava, Ukraine
- Occupations: Singer, actor

Alloise, stage name of Alla Jevhenivna Moskovka (Ukrainian: Алла Євгенівна Московка; born 19 October 1984) is a Ukrainian singer.

== Life and career ==
Alloise was born on 19 October 1984, in Poltava. She started her career as a member of the musical groups Tomato Jaws and Gorchitza, before launching her solo career in 2012, winning the same year the MTV Europe Music Award for Best Ukrainian Act. The following year she released her first studio album Bygone, earned her first nominations at YUNA, the country's top music award, for revelation of the year and for best duet ("Who's the Fool").

In 2016, Alloise took part in Vidbir, reaching the semi-finals with the song "Crown". Episodes, the singer's second LP, was released a few weeks later.

About four years later, Alloise returned to the music scene with the release of the EP Bare Nerve, which was nominated at YUNA in the "Best Release in Other Formats" category. The same year she launched the side project VCHASNO, a musical collaboration with Portuguese poet Mogni Rarchi.

== Discography ==
with Gorchitza

- Highlights (2008)
- It's You (2011)

Solo

- Bygone (2013)
- Episodes (2016)
- Bare Nerve (EP, 2020)
