= Would You...? =

1998 single by Touch and Go

Single by Touch and Go

from the album I Find You Very Attractive
- Released: 26 October 1998
- Genre: Pop; jazz
- Length: 3:12
- Label: V2
- Songwriter: David Lowe
- Producer: David Lowe

Touch and Go singles chronology
"Would You...?" (1998)	"Straight to... Number One" (1999)

Audio
- "Would You...?" on YouTube

"Would You...?" is a song by British electronic group Touch and Go. Written and produced by band member David Lowe, it was released as the first single from their debut album, I Find You Very Attractive (1998). The lyrics - marked by their distinctive sampling of a woman's voice saying "I've noticed you around / I find you very attractive / Would you go to bed with me?" - was inspired by a psychological study conducted in 1978.

Issued as a single on 26 October 1998, "Would You...?" reached the number-three spot on the UK Singles Chart and became a hit in Europe, reaching the top 10 in seven countries. It was also a top-five hit in New Zealand, where it peaked at number four in early 1999. In the United States, the song appeared on the Billboard Maxi-Singles Sales chart, reaching number six in January 1999.

In 2023, Campbell and Alcemist debuted a drum and bass remix entitled Would You (go to bed with me?) at the Parklife festival in Manchesher, UK. The track was later released on Atlantic Records, peaking at number 29 in the UK singles charts.

== Critical reception ==
An editor from the Daily Record commented, "This anonymous dance hit features a lead singer who claims she is an alien. Even record label V2 are keeping her identity secret, which suggests there's a balding producer behind it." Pan-European magazine Music & Media wrote, "When an unknown girl singer meets up with an obscure soundtrack producer, what do you get? In this case, the answer is a ditty boasting some rather raunchy lyrics, driven by a jazzy beat and an absolutely irresistible trumpet part. However, the main asset of Would You...? is an absolute killer hook, which goes some way to making it one [of] the best pop singles of the year."

== Commercial performance ==
On 1 November 1998, "Would You...?" debuted at its peak of number three on the UK Singles Chart, number two on the UK Dance Chart, and number one on the UK Indie Chart. By the end of November, it had shipped 200,000 copies in the UK, allowing it to be certified silver by the British Phonographic Industry. As well as reaching number six in Ireland, the track peaked inside the top 10 in Denmark (number seven), Greece (number nine), Italy (number two), Norway (number 10), Spain (number six), and Switzerland (number four). Elsewhere in Europe, it became a top-20 hit in Flanders, Iceland, the Netherlands, and Sweden, attaining a peak of number 11 on the Eurochart Hot 100. It was the continent's 81st-most-successful hit of 1999.

Worldwide, the song charted highly in New Zealand, peaking at number four for two weeks in January and February 1999, and entered the top 30 in Australia, where it debuted at its peak of number 27 and stayed on the chart for six weeks. In North America, it appeared on the Canadian RPM 100 Hit Tracks chart, climbing to number 64 in March 1999. It was also hit on the Canadian and American dance charts, reaching number 21 on the RPM Dance chart and number six on the US Billboard Maxi-Singles Sales chart. Additionally, the song peaked at number 42 on the US Radio & Records Alternative Top 50 chart.

== As a soundtrack ==
The Peruvian TV channel Andina de Televisión, through its extinct gossip program Magaly Teve, used it for its section of bloopers that end with the Crazy Seal breaks TVs, and an instrumental version sounds, created by the Peruvian producer and singer Carlos Figueroa which also makes different versions of the song of Phone Gossip. Previously, the original version was used. The song was also used in Miss World 1998 during the presentation of a group of delegates, and in Miss Universe 2002, the latter with a different instrumental version during the swimsuit competition.

In an interview published on YouTube in 2025, David Lowe explains how the song was also used as inspiration for the theme to The One Show, the BBC’s nightly entertainment show.

== Track listings ==
- UK CD and cassette single; Australian CD single
1. "Would You...?" (radio edit) – 3:12
2. "Would You...?" (Trailermen Go to Rio mix) – 6:59
3. "Would You...?" (Homewreckers mix) – 3:54
- UK 12-inch single

A1. "Would You...?" (Trailermen Go to Rio mix) – 6:59
B1. "Would You...?" (radio edit) – 3:12
B2. "Would You...?" (Homewreckers mix) – 3:54

- European CD single
1. "Would You...?" (radio edit) – 3:12
2. "Would You...?" (Trailermen Go to Rio mix radio edit) – 3:14
- US 12-inch single

A1. "Would You...? (radio edit) – 3:11
A2. "Would You...? (Trailermen Go to Rio extended mix) – 6:59
B1. "Would You...? (Trailermen Go to Rio mix) – 3:11
B2. "Would You...? (Homewreckers mix) – 3:54
B3. "Would You...? (instrumental) – 3:11

* Note: The US maxi-single switches tracks A2 and B1.

- US cassette single
1. "Would You...? (radio edit) – 3:11

== Charts ==
=== Weekly charts ===
Chart (1998–1999)	Peak position
Australia (ARIA)	27
Austria (Ö3 Austria Top 40)	27
Belgium (Ultratop 50 Flanders)	11
Canada Top Singles (RPM)	64
Canada Dance/Urban (RPM)	21
Denmark (IFPI)	7
Europe (Eurochart Hot 100)	11
Finland (Suomen virallinen lista)	12
Germany (GfK)	21
Greece (IFPI)	9
Iceland (Íslenski Listinn Topp 40)	17
Ireland (IRMA)	6
Italy (Musica e dischi)	2
Italy Airplay (Music & Media)	2
Netherlands (Dutch Top 40)	12
Netherlands (Single Top 100)	16
New Zealand (Recorded Music NZ)	4
Norway (VG-lista)	10
Poland Airplay (Music & Media)	16
Scottish Singles Sales (Official Charts)	6
Spain (Promusicae)	6
Sweden (Sverigetopplistan)	19
Switzerland (Schweizer Hitparade)	4
UK Singles (Official Charts)	3
UK Dance (Official Charts)	2
UK Indie (Official Charts)	1
US Maxi-Singles Sales (Billboard)	6
US Alternative Top 50 (Radio & Records)	42

=== Year-end charts ===
Chart (1998)	Position
Belgium (Ultratop 50 Flanders)	88
UK Singles (OCC)	85

Chart (1999)	Position
Europe (Eurochart Hot 100)	81
Switzerland (Schweizer Hitparade)	25
US Maxi-Singles Sales (Billboard)	46

== Certifications ==
Region	Certification	Certified units/sales
United Kingdom (BPI)	Silver	200,000^{^}
^{^} Shipments figures based on certification alone.

== In popular culture ==
"Would You...?" has been included on television show soundtracks such as G String Divas and the cult British series As If. The track has also been sampled for San Pellegrino, Carlsberg, and Nokia advertisements.
