= Dreamcatcher (David Lowe album) =

Studio album by Dreamcatcher
- Released: 27 May 1997
- Genres: Electronic, ambient, chill-out
- Length: 50:26
- Label: Oval/Island Records

Dreamcatcher is an album by the English composer David Lowe, under his Dreamcatcher moniker. Lowe would not record another Dreamcatcher album for almost a decade.

== Track listing ==
All tracks composed by David Lowe.

| No. | Title | Length |
|---|---|---|
| 1. | "In a Ocean of Joy" | 4:05 |
| 2. | "Seventh Heaven" | 3:49 |
| 3. | "Ice" | 4:25 |
| 4. | "The Second Day" | 4:59 |
| 5. | "This Is the Time" | 3:25 |
| 6. | "Falling with You" | 4:38 |
| 7. | "Call of the Wild" | 3:24 |
| 8. | "Love Is a Friend" | 4:43 |
| 9. | "Heat and Dust" | 5:55 |
| 10. | "Life" | 5:03 |
| 11. | "In a Ocean of Joy (Ghost mix)" | 6:00 |
