= Gimme Gimme (Inna song) =

Single by Inna

from the album Nirvana
- Released: 1 February 2017
- Genre: Dance-pop
- Length: 2:57
- Label: Roton; Global
- Songwriters: Elena Alexandra Apostoleanu; Sebastian Barac; Marcel Botezan; David Ciente; Breyan Isaac; Elena Luminița Vasile
- Producers: Barac; Botezan; Ciente

Inna singles chronology
| "Heaven" (2016) | "Gimme Gimme" (2017) | "Ruleta" (2017) |

"Gimme Gimme" is a song recorded by Romanian singer Inna for her fifth studio album, Nirvana. It was made available for digital consumption as the record's first single on 1 February 2017 through Roton and Global Records. The recording was written by Inna, Breyan Isaac and Elena Luminița Vasile, along with its producers Sebastian Barac, Marcel Botezan and David Ciente. An up-tempo dance-pop song with Bollywood, Indian and Gyspy influences, "Gimme Gimme" features "simple but meaningful" romantic lyrics.

An accompanying music video for "Gimme Gimme" was shot by Edward Aninaru in October 2016 in San Miguel de Allende, Mexico, and was uploaded onto Inna's YouTube channel simultaneously with the single's release. During the filming sessions, the singer was accompanied by a Romanian and South American team, and both John Perez and Khaled Mokhtar served as directors of photography. The clip portrays Inna exploring the city and ends with her appearance at a party at night. Music critics were positive towards the recording, calling it summery and noting its club-oriented style. Commercially, it reached the top 20 in Romania, Turkey and the French, Polish and British dance club charts.

== Composition and reception ==
"Gimme Gimme"
A 19-second sample of "Gimme Gimme", a Bollywood, Indian and Gyspy-inspired pop song with "simple but meaningful lyrics".

The song was written by Inna, Breyan Isaac and Elena Luminița Vasile, along with its producers Sebastian Barac, Marcel Botezan and David Ciente. Music portal YaBB Music described "Gimme Gimme" as Bollywood-inspired, while Jonathan Currinn from Celebmix implied that it is "upbeat and catchy" and "suggests a summer sound for her fifth album". He further wrote that the track "has simple but meaningful lyrics that are romantic while still having her infectious club sound." Raluca Tanasă from InfoMusic saw "Gimme Gimme" as featuring both Indian and Gyspy music influences, and described it as summery.

The singer herself confessed that the recording is "energetic, and has a fresh sound perfect for parties"; echoing the same thought, Urban.ro labelled "Gimme Gimme" as "good for club nights". Spanish website Trendecias opined that the recording "is going to become one of those songs that the radios won't stop playing" and invited its readers to "turn up the volume and enjoy it". In June 2017, American blogger Perez Hilton praised the track in a post on his blog as being "next level", saying it had major potential to become a hit in the United States. Hilton also shared the song on Twitter, where Inna thanked him for his support. He further described "Gimme Gimme" as pop and having a current sound.

== Music video ==
=== Background and release ===
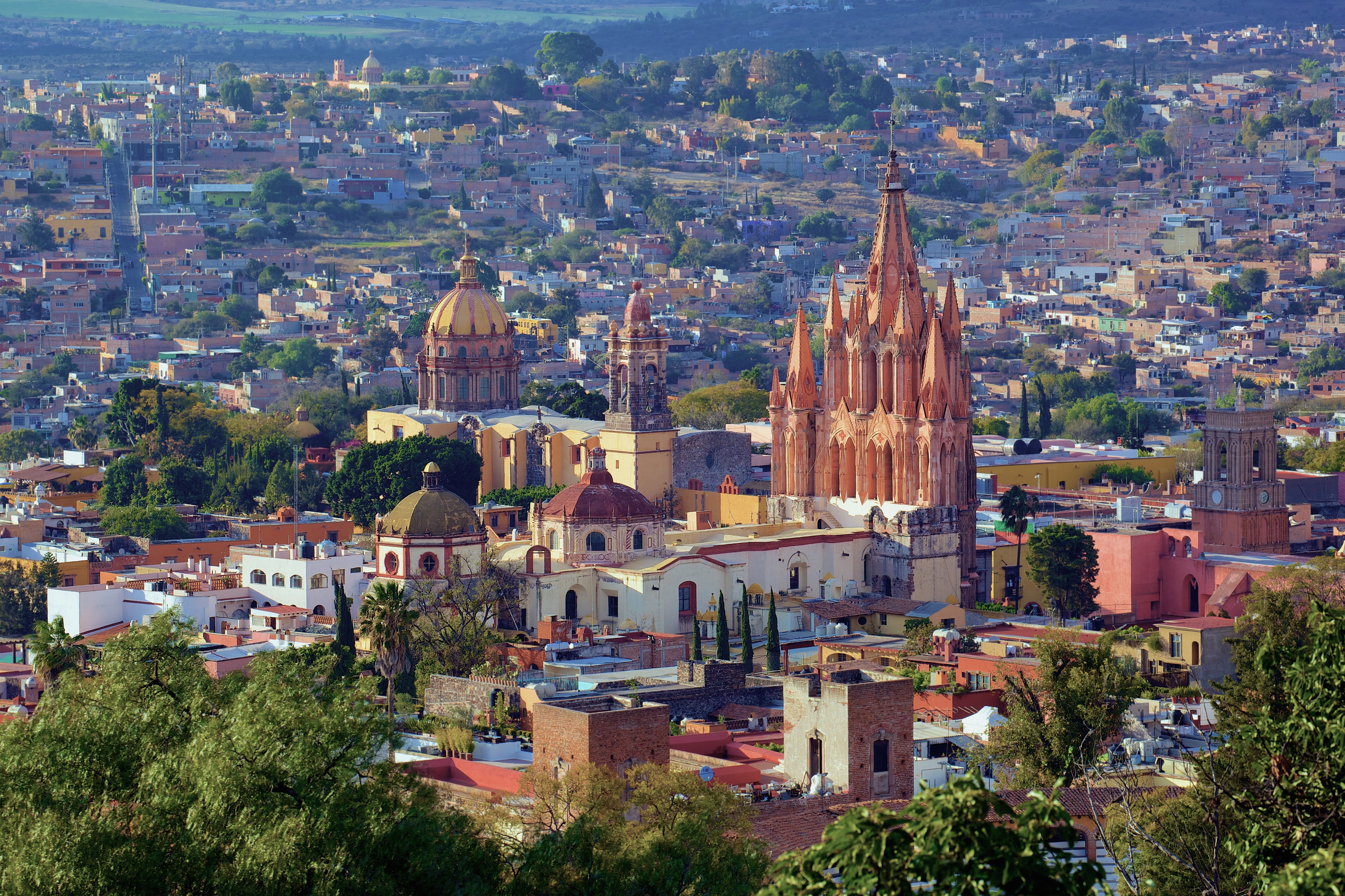
The music video for "Gimme Gimme" was shot in October 2016 by Edward Aninaru in San Miguel de Allende, Mexico.

On 31 January 2017, Inna uploaded a teaser of the music video for "Gimme Gimme" onto her YouTube channel after teasing it for a couple of months. It portrayed her and several background dancers in various outfits. The clip was shot in October 2016 in San Miguel de Allende, Mexico by Edward Aninaru, and is her second visual filmed in that territory after "Bad Boys" (2016). Aninaru had previously worked with Inna on "Wow" (2012) and "Inndia" (2012). During the filming sessions, the singer was assisted by a Romanian and South American team, with both John Perez and Khaled Mokhtar serving as directors of photography.

When interviewed by Mexican newspapers in October 2016, she described the video as "[having] very beautiful girls and guys who will dance around [her] and show the force of love in their lives, especially in [hers]." On the same occasion, she also expressed interest in working with Mexican singer and actress Belinda, and praised the Day of the Dead alongside saying that the music video is planned to emphasis her vocals, image and "beauty of the city". The visual finally saw its premiere on YouTube on 1 February 2017. Inna thanked her crew in an interview, "It is a joy and pleasure to film the video in Mexico, a place in this world where I feel the love and the kindness of the people. Also, I have worked with friends, people that I trust and appreciate, like Edward Aninaru, John Perez and Khaled Mokhtar. I thank them for their professionalism." The clip reached over five million views on YouTube in one week, to which the singer replied, "I didn't expect such a positive feedback in such a short time, thus I want to thank to my fans in the entire world. I hope that 'Gimme Gimme' will make them happy and give them energy every day."

=== Synopsis and reception ===
Shot from the music video, portraying Inna leaning over a Volkswagen Beetle car with a man in it. She wears a yellow wool suit from Max Mara, worth circa 6350 lei.

The clip begins with shots of San Miguel de Allende and a couple standing close to each other. Subsequently, a man is seen transporting balloons in front of Inna, who leans over a Volkswagen Beetle car sporting a yellow wool suit from Max Mara, worth circa 6350 lei. The man in the vehicle was predicted by Celebmix from a teaser video to be her love interest. Next, the singer walks through the city, encountering a banana stand, an old woman in traditional clothing and a piñata, which she eventually breaks. She wears a black skirt designed by Jean Paul Gaultier. Subsequently, the singer and two fellow females with hand fans perform to the track in front of the entrance of a building; Inna has a top with ruffles on designed by Johanna Oritz, worth $850, along with Samurai Earrings from Dsquared24, worth $142. In the last scene of the video, the singer and a crowd of people are shown partying "satisfied" and "[letting] loose" at night. Scenes interspersed through the main plot portray her and background dancers (one of which is Nadd Hu) performing to the song in front of red and blue backdrops, and the singer standing in front of an old door or a ventilator. Some scenes are replayed or played backwards throughout the clip.

Romanian website YaBB Music pointed out "romantic" influences in the clip. Currinn from Celebmix described the music video as being "complete with bright primary colours" and wrote that Inna "[looks] as stunning as ever. She brings her usual stage presence to this music video. Bright, beautiful, and definitely hot." For his own website, he further wrote that the clip is "filled with summer sounds and gorgeous visuals that excite [him] for summer" and that "Inna is stylishly sexy". Currinn awarded it four out of five stars, concluding that "this video totally works, although it's a shame there wasn't a romantic element in the visual". Urban.ro said that the music video is "full of colorful frameworks that make us think about summer", while Russian website Zircular pointed out the absence of a plot and stated that Inna "focuses on the male audience". ZU TV wrote that "[the singer] and her dancers warm up the atmosphere and make you want to have fun". The music video received notable airplay on Romanian television, peaking at number eight on Media Forest's TV Airplay Chart in April 2017.

== Promotion and commercial performance ==
Inna performed stripped-down versions of the song on 16 February 2017 for Romanian radio station Kiss FM, and on 5 April 2017 for Radio ZU. On the latter occasion, she also premiered a previously unreleased track called "Me Gusta". Inna conducted a supportive tour for the song in Chile, Mexico, the Netherlands, Romania, Spain and Turkey. In December 2019, she performed the track on O Ses Türkiye. "Gimme Gimme" debuted at number 94 on Romania's Airplay 100 for the week ending on 12 February 2017, and rose 45 places to number 49 in its second week. It continued ascending on the chart until peaking at number 16 on 9 April 2017. On the French Club 40 chart, "Gimme Gimme" opened at number 25 on 17 March 2017, and reached number 17 on 14 April 2017. It also peaked at number five in Turkey, number 24 on Poland's Dance Top 50 chart, and number three on Music Week's Commercial Pop chart.

== Track listing ==
Digital single
| No. | Title | Length |
|---|---|---|
| 1. | "Gimme Gimme" | 2:57 |

Remixes EP
| No. | Title | Length |
|---|---|---|
| 1. | "Gimme Gimme" (Radio Edit) | 2:57 |
| 2. | "Gimme Gimme" (Andros Remix) | 2:43 |
| 3. | "Gimme Gimme" (Armageddon Turk Says No Remix) | 3:13 |
| 4. | "Gimme Gimme" (Dj Dark & MD Dj Remix) | 3:05 |
| 5. | "Gimme Gimme" (Ness Remix) | 2:58 |
| 6. | "Gimme Gimme" (Sak Noel Remix) | 3:07 |
| 7. | "Gimme Gimme" (Dirty Nano Remix) | 4:14 |
| 8. | "Gimme Gimme" (Timmy Rise & Barington Lawrence Remix) | 4:13 |

== Charts ==
=== Weekly charts ===
| Chart (2017) | Peak position |
|---|---|
| France (Club 40) | 17 |
| Poland (Dance Top 50) | 24 |
| Romania (Airplay 100) | 16 |
| Romania TV Airplay (Media Forest) | 8 |
| Turkey (Number One Top 40) | 5 |
| UK Commercial Pop (Music Week) | 3 |

=== Year-end charts ===
| Chart (2017) | Position |
|---|---|
| Romania (Airplay 100) | 96 |

== Release history ==
| Territory | Date | Format(s) | Label |
|---|---|---|---|
| Various | 1 February 2017 | Digital download | Roton/ Global |
| Italy | 28 June 2017 | Radio airplay | Warner |
