= David Lowe (television and radio composer) =

English composer

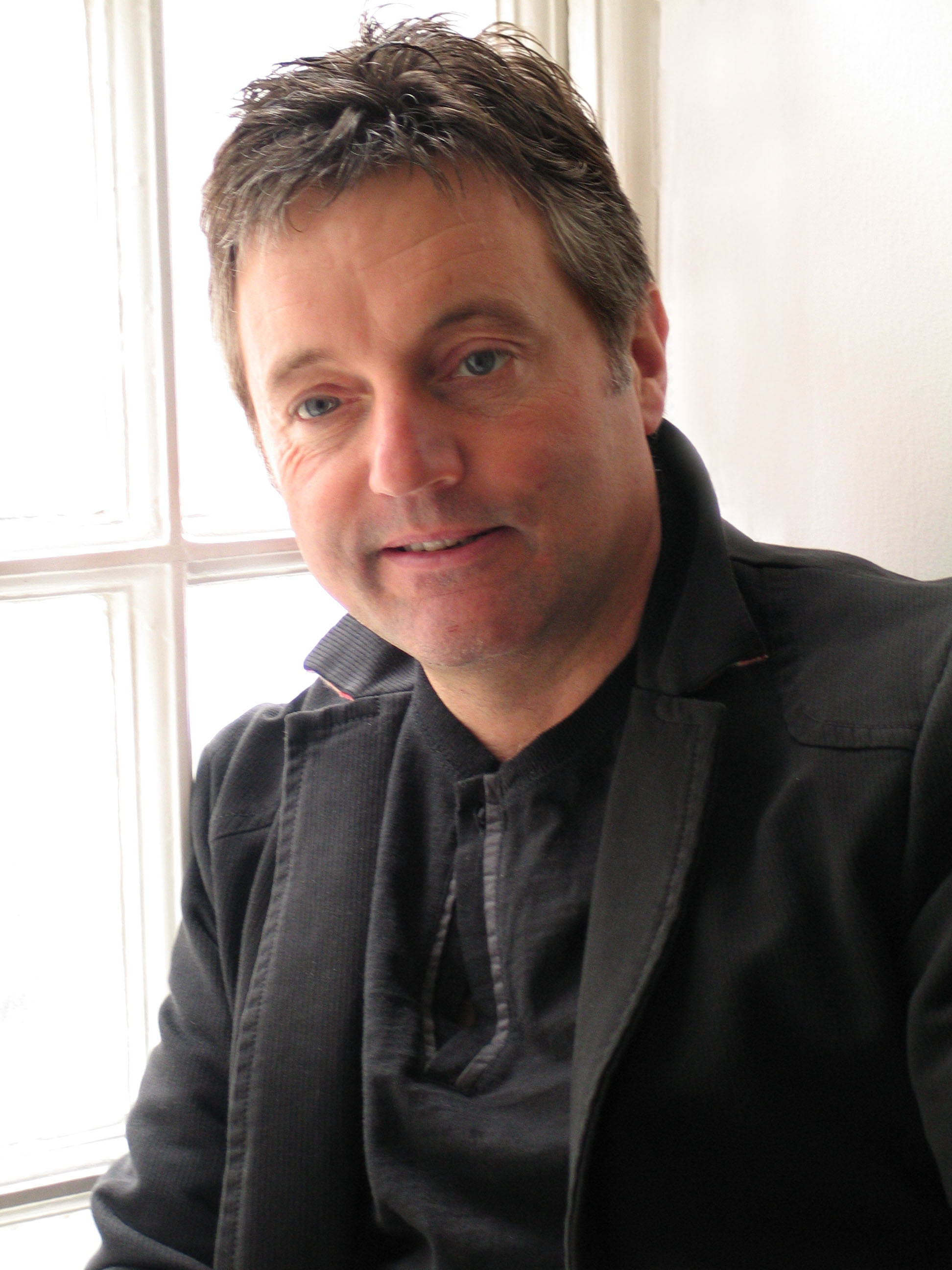
- Lowe in 2006

Background information
- Born: David Hodson Lowe; 11 April 1959 (age 67); Sutton Coldfield, Birmingham, West Midlands, England
- Occupations: Station assistant and sound engineer, BBC Radio WM (1980–1985); Composer (1983–present)
- Website: davidlowemusic.com

David Hodson Lowe (born 11 April 1959) is an English composer and music producer. His work comprises primarily music for television, radio, commercials and idents. Lowe is best known for his extensive work on theme tunes for bulletins and programmes for BBC News.

== Early life and career ==
Lowe has never received any formal musical education, and began his early career in broadcasting. He started part-time work at BBC Radio Birmingham (now BBC Radio WM) while still a student at Riland Bedford (now Plantsbrook School) in Sutton Coldfield. Based at the former Pebble Mill Studios, he developed a strong interest in sound production, and was keen to work full-time for the BBC. He was unsuccessful at getting a position, however, and continued freelancing at BBC WM until 1981 when he attained a permanent post as a location sound recordist with Magpie Film Productions.

During this time he became interested in the relatively new area of electronic music and synthesizers. He borrowed a Crumar Trilogy synthesizer from a friend and created his first multi-track compositions using two domestic cassette decks. He later acquired one of the first affordable polyphonic synthesizers, a Roland Juno 6.

He formed a band with Samantha Meah called the Cool Fish, which found a reasonable amount of success, supporting Ruby Turner, Fine Young Cannibals and appearing on Central Television. However Lowe was more interested in writing and studio production than live performance, and the band did not continue.

His first opportunity to write for television came through a chance meeting with a graphic designer at BBC Pebble Mill, which led to Lowe's first TV commission for BBC Midlands Today. Lowe saw this as the opportunity to fulfil both his passions for working in broadcasting and writing music, and from then on worked on furthering his career as a television composer.

Lowe is a member of the British Academy of Film and Television Arts (BAFTA) and the British Academy of Songwriters, Composers and Authors (BASCA). He has twice been awarded honorary doctorates, first by Staffordshire University in 2005, and then by Birmingham City University in 2014.

== Works ==
=== Albums and singles ===
In 1997, Lowe released his debut album, Dreamcatcher. He performed a live mix that year at the first Thames River Festival, which accompanied a record breaking tightrope walk across the river.

His single "Would You...?" under the name Touch and Go was a top 3 hit in the UK in 1998 and a hit in the rest of Europe in early 1999. The album I've Noticed You Around spawned more hit singles in Eastern Europe and Russia. "Straight...to Number One" was chosen by Apple to launch the iTunes site in the US, where every track on the album has been used in films, television and/or commercials.

=== BBC News ===
In 1999, Lowe created perhaps one of his most famous compositions, the current BBC News themes. Whilst previous themes had been orchestral, these new themes made extensive use of the 'pips' that are used on the hour on BBC Radio stations, along with more electric sounds. Since 1999 his themes have been remixed numerous times for BBC News in the UK as well as the international channel, BBC World News. Two CDs of Lowe's music have been released by the BBC. BBC World: The Music, released in 2001, is a compilation of some of Lowe's work for BBC World, made available after significant demand from viewers. The news theme is notably sampled in the 2020 track “Get Your Brits Out” from Irish hip-hop trio Kneecap.

For the BBC's coverage of the 2019 general election, Lowe remixed a version of "Arthur" from Rick Wakeman's rock concept album The Myths and Legends of King Arthur and the Knights of the Round Table, bringing back a track that was previously used for BBC election night coverage from 1979 to 2005.

=== Television ===
David Lowe's first television composition was the 1983 title music for BBC Midlands Today, followed in 1988 by BBC Wales Today and he went back to BBC Birmingham and Midlands Today again in 1992, creating title music for both Midlands Today and Pebble Mill.

His work on other British television programmes includes The One Show, Countryfile, Panorama, Cash in the Attic, Wildlife on One and The Really Wild Show (all on BBC One), The Car's the Star on BBC Two, Newyddion on S4C, Grand Designs on Channel 4, and the Channel 5 motoring programme Fifth Gear. He has also created musical identities for BBC Worldwide, BBC Entertainment, Euronews, Al Arabiya and Abu Dhabi TV in the Middle East, NDTV in India, TV2 in Norway, and in 2013 for China's CCTV-1. For radio he produced the current identity for the BBC World Service, and for BBC Arabic Radio.

Through his website, Lowe has released compilations of some of his television soundtracks. TV Chill is a mix from a variety of different programmes, whilst Grand Designs features a full-length arrangement of the main theme, and other music from the Channel 4 series. Both were produced after interest from viewers, including a request from one to have the Grand Designs music played at her wedding.

Wild Caribbean features prominent use of Lowe's music from the BBC Two series of the same name, and remixes of his Touch and Go tracks "So Hot" and "Life's a Beach".

Lowe was invited by the British Academy of Composers and Songwriters to compose the theme for the 50th Ivor Novello Awards ceremony in 2005. In 2006 he was commissioned to write the music for the BAFTA Film and Television Awards and for the BBC's coverage of the Winter Olympics.

=== Festivals and events ===
He has performed at several WOMAD festivals worldwide. In 2004, he was commissioned to provide a music soundscape for The Tropical Biome at the Eden Project, which was performed at WOMAD Reading in 2005. Reinforced with several new songs, the material has been reworked to form his second Dreamcatcher album, What...is in Between?, released on Oval Records in October 2006. Featured vocalists are poet and novelist Benjamin Zephaniah and Japanese artist and composer Mieko Shimizu, while Lowe himself sings on "Still The Greatest."

Lowe also co-produced an album for poet Roger McGough. Between excerpts of McGough's live performance, he set some of the poetry to music.

Lowe was also commissioned to create a global themed remix of "Chariots of Fire" by Vangelis for the London 2012 Olympics Medal Presentations.
