= Heaven (Inna song) =

Single by Inna

from the album Nirvana (Deluxe edition)
- Released: 10 June 2016
- Genre: Dance-pop; tropical house
- Length: 3:26
- Label: Roton
- Songwriter(s): Andreas Schuller; Leroy Clampitt; Sebastian Barac; Marcel Botezan; Laila Samulesen; Trey Campbell; Theea Eliza Miculescu
- Producer(s): Sebastian Barac; Marcel Botezan

Inna singles chronology
"Rendez Vous" (2016)	"Heaven" (2016)	"Gimme Gimme" (2017)

"Heaven" is a song recorded by Romanian recording artist Inna, included on the deluxe edition of her fifth studio album Nirvana (2017). It was released for digital download on 10 June 2016 through Roton. The recording was written by Andreas Schuller, Leroy Clampitt, Sebastian Barac, Marcel Botezan, Laila Samulesen, Trey Campbell and Theea Eliza Miculescu, while production was handled by Barac and Botezan. A dance-pop and tropical house recording, the single was generally acclaimed by music critics, who praised it as an earworm with Middle Eastern influences. While reviews noted lyrics in English, French, and Spanish, the singer explained that the refrain was written in a language she invented with her label. At the 2017 Radio România Actualități Awards, "Heaven" was nominated in three categories.

An accompanying music video was posted onto YouTube on 7 June 2016 after a teaser premiered on 3 June 2016; it was shot by John Perez in Shangri-La, Mauritius, in April 2016. The clip portrays Inna at a seaside resort community with a love interest, played by Mauritian actor Olivier Phineas Boissard. To promote the single, Inna performed in Mauritius, and sang "Heaven" in stripped-down versions for Romanian radio stations. The track was commercially successful in Eastern Europe, peaking within the top ten in Bulgaria, Romania and Poland.

== Background and release ==
"Heaven" was written by Andreas Schuller, Leroy Clampitt, Sebastian Barac, Marcel Botezan, Laila Samulesen, Trey Campbell and Theea Eliza Miculescu, while production was handled by Barac and Botezan. The single was released on 10 June 2016, three days after the premiere of its clip. The upcoming premiere of a second version of the song, featuring a "well-known" artist, was announced, but never materialized. Several remixes of the track were also made available for consumption as stand-alone releases or on a remix extended play. About the track, Inna said that she was "very happy to release 'Heaven'. It is one of the songs which [she] fell in love with after the first hear and one which [her] fans waited for impatiently. It's the ideal sound for the summer and [she hopes] you will enjoy it." The song was later included on her third compilation album, 10 ans de hits! (2018), as well as featured on the 2020 SoundCloud deluxe edition of her fifth studio album Nirvana (2017).

== Composition and reception ==
"Heaven"
A 17-second sample of "Heaven", a dance-pop and tropical house song.

While El Broide of People Magazine wrote that the single is performed in English and French, website Aficia's Valentin Malfroy noted that Spanish is also incorporated, also pointing out a male voice providing vocals for the refrain sung with a strong African accent. However, in an interview with Romanian station Kiss FM, Inna explained that the chorus is written in a language created by her and her label Global Records, further stating that, "At Global Records, we stay so much together that we don't understand ourselves in Romanian, but also not in any other language. So we thought to create an own language. If the ones from Game of Thrones can do it, then why can't we do it as well?" People Magazine called the track a "catchy" tropical house song that "effortlessly blends together" tropical sounds with a Middle Eastern flair, along with "simple and cheesy" lyrics. Jonathan Currinn from Outlet Magazine labelled "Heaven" an "exotic anthem", while Urban.ro called it a dance-pop song with exotic elements. Radio 21 noted that the track seemed to be influenced by Arabic rhythms.

Upon its release, the recording was met with mostly positive reviews. People Magazine praised the song's production, calling it "the perfect track to play at the pool or a beach holiday" and "something different from anything on radio at the moment". Though the review criticized Inna's pronunciation of the lyrics and wished the text was stronger, it concluded: "this is definitely a song that we need on our summer playlist". Outlet Magazine applauded "Heaven" for "bringing the summer heat" and for being "the ideal song to sit outside and listen to all day long as the sun's rays caress your skin". Urban.ro foresaw it as being successful on radios, and an editor of Pro FM listed the recording in their list of "16 hits with which Inna made history". At the 2017 Radio România Actualități Awards, "Heaven" was nominated in the Song of the Year, Pop/Dance Song of the Year and Big Like categories.

== Commercial performance ==
Following the premiere of "Heaven" on Romanian radio, the song debuted on native Airplay 100 at number 58 on 3 July 2016, and climbed one position higher the next week. On 17 July 2016, the track rose up 16 places to number 41, reaching its peak position at number four on 16 October 2016. According to statistics by Media Forest, the single was the third most-played recording on Romanian radio on 9 October, while its music video was the sixth most-aired visual on Romanian television. "Heaven" also charted within the top ten on the Polish Dance Top 50 in its fourth charting week, 15 positions above Inna's previous single "Rendez Vous" (2016). According to Tophit, the single reached position 151 in the Commonwealth of Independent States.

== Promotion ==
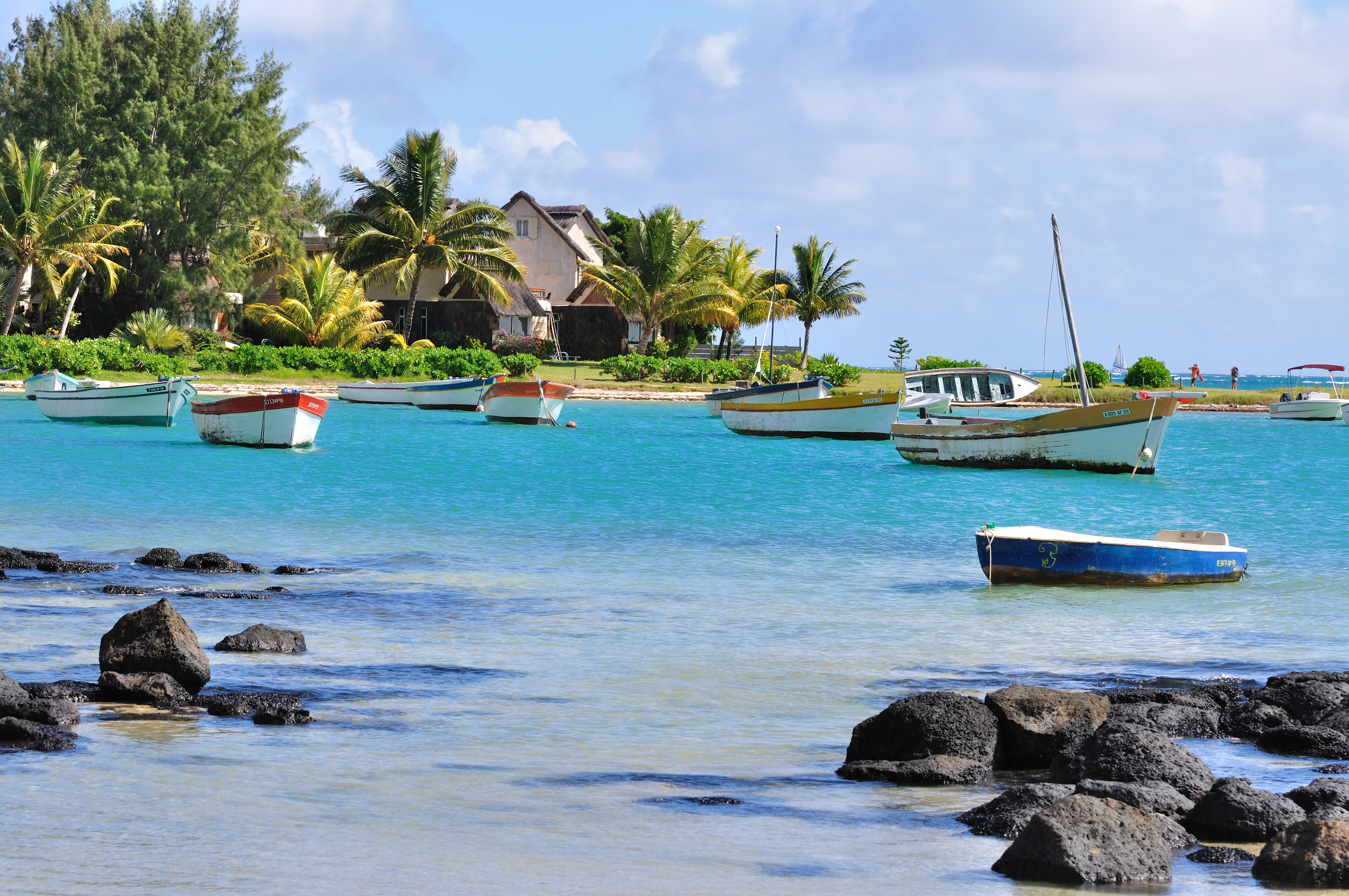
The accompanying music video for "Heaven" was shot in Mauritius (pictured) by John Perez in April 2016.

To promote the single, Inna performed at a concert in Mauritius. She also sang stripped-down versions of the song for Romanian radio stations Kiss FM and Radio 21 on 21 June 2016 and 22 June 2016, respectively.

In an interview with Romanian magazine Unica, Inna announced a music video for "Heaven". The video was previewed in a teaser on 3 June 2016, and was posted in full on 7 June 2016 on Inna's YouTube channel. It was shot by John Perez in April 2016 in Mauritius at the Shangri-La resort. Khaled Mokhtar served as the assistant, director of photography and editor of the clip. Andra Moga did the make-up, while the outfits were procured by RDStyling.

The clip begins with footage from a Mauritius seaside resort community, followed by shots of Inna with a love interest (played by Olivier Phineas Boissard) walking through the city, interacting with locals, and going to a party. Subsequently, Inna is shown from the perspective of the male during a boat trip; the clip ends with her hovering through the sea wearing a yellow dress. Scenes are interspersed of Inna walking on the sea coast while sporting a white and black blouse. She is also seen performing hand movements in front of a tree and other further footage from the party is shown.

== Credits and personnel ==
Credits adapted from Spanish Charts and Top Românesc.

Technical and composing credits

- Inna – lead vocals
- Andreas Schuller – composer
- Leroy Clampitt – composer
- Sebastian Barac – composer, producer
- Marcel Botezan – composer, producer
- Laila Samulesen – composer
- Trey Campbell – composer
- Theea Eliza Miculescu – composer

Visual credits

- John Perez – director
- Khaled Mokhtar – assistant, director of photography, editor
- Andra Moga – make-up
- RDStyling – outfits

== Track listing ==
Digital single
No.	Title	Length
1.	"Heaven"	3:28

Additional versions
No.	Title	Length
1.	"Heaven"	3:28
2.	"Heaven" (extended version)	4:02
3.	"Heaven" (Addictive Elements & Mika Violin Remix)	3:42
4.	"Heaven" (Adrian Funk X Olix Remix)	3:30
5.	"Heaven" (Alfred Beck & Chewy Vega Remix)	4:44
6.	"Heaven" (Andros Remix)	3:32
7.	"Heaven" (Chadash Cort Remix)	4:25
8.	"Heaven" (Clanker Jones Remix)	3:31
9.	"Heaven" (Criminal Sounds Remix)	4:21
10.	"Heaven" (Dario Vega Remix)	3:34
11.	"Heaven" (Deepen Groove & Ralph Kayden Remix)	3:50
12.	"Heaven" (Deepierro Remix)	4:25
13.	"Heaven" (Dirty Nano Remix)	4:30
14.	"Heaven" (Dj Asher Remix)	5:13
15.	"Heaven" (Dream Big Remix Edit)	3:23
16.	"Heaven" (Electric Bodega Remix)	3:12
17.	"Heaven" (LLP Remix Edit)	3:39
18.	"Heaven" (LLP Remix)	5:20
19.	"Heaven" (Manuel Riva Remix)	5:23
20.	"Heaven" (Midi Culture Remix)	5:12
21.	"Heaven" (Paul Damixie Remix)	5:31
22.	"Heaven" (Redshuz Remix)	3:14
23.	"Heaven" (Sllash Remix)	5:19
24.	"Heaven" (Smax Remix)	3:09
25.	"Heaven" (Thrace Remix)	3:17
26.	"Heaven" (Tiben Remix)	5:25
27.	"Heaven" (Tom Ferry Remix)	4:44

== Charts ==
Chart (2016)	Peak position
Poland (Dance Top 50)	6
CIS (Tophit)	151
Romania (Airplay 100)	4
Romania Radio Songs (Media Forest)	3
Romania TV Airplay (Media Forest)	6
Turkey (Number One Chart)	39

== Release history ==
Territory	Date	Format(s)	Label
Denmark	10 June 2016	Digital download	Roton
Germany	10 June 2016	Digital download	Roton
Netherlands	10 June 2016	Digital download	Roton
Romania	10 June 2016	Digital download	Roton
Sweden	10 June 2016	Digital download	Roton
United States	10 June 2016	Digital download	Roton
