= G String Divas =

- Genre: Documentary
- Directed by: Patti Kaplan
- Country of origin: United States
- Original language: English
- No. of seasons: 1
- No. of episodes: 13

Production
- Running time: 30 minutes

Original release
- Network: HBO
- Release: September 23, 2000 – 2000

G String Divas is an American documentary series that aired on HBO. The show was filmed in 2000, and follows the lives of strippers working in a Bristol, Pennsylvania gentlemen's club.

== Overview ==
The show has 13 episodes and there were nine featured women: Miss Bunny, Jordan, Ginger, Cashmere, Joey, Chrissy, Silver, Summer and Angel. The premiere episode delivered a 7.7 share, or 3.4 million viewers. The show was produced and directed by Patti Kaplan, who also produced HBO's Real Sex series. The club featured on the show, Divas International Club, was attached to a hotel, and was converted to a banquet facility shortly after filming ended.

In one episode, Summer, one of the dancers, refers to a homicide case in which an obsessed customer killed his wife. The killer, Craig Rabinowitz, became obsessed with her when she was dancing at another Pennsylvania strip club. The case was later profiled in an episode of Forensic Files, called "Summer Obsession", in which Miss Bunny, another performer from the HBO show, was interviewed.
