= Drop (music) =

Sudden change of rhythm or bass line

"Glass Tiger"
A track by Disparition that incorporates a beat drop

In this spectrogram of "Glass Tiger", the buildup and drop are visible leading up to 2:05

A drop or beat drop in music, made popular by electronic dance music (EDM) styles, is a point in a music track where a sudden change of rhythm or bass line occurs, which is preceded by a build-up section and break. The drop is the loudest portion of an EDM song.

Originating from disco and 1970s rock, drops are found in genres such as EDM, trap, hip-hop, K-pop and country. With the aid of music production applications, drops can vary in instrumentation and sound. Electronic instruments and tools for making drops include synthesizers, vocal samples, a drum beat, and basslines.

Certain drops can include a "beat-up" (so-named because it is a point where the volume of the foundational kick drum beat is increased, after it has been faded down during a break or buildup) and "climax" (a single, striking drop done late in the track). There are also types of drops which deviate from the standard, such as "anti-drops" (songs in which the chorus is more minimal than the build-up) and consecutive "superseding-drops".

== History ==
The drop "...grew out of '70s rock". A subtype of the drop, the bass drop, was used in the Miami bass subgenre of hip hop music in the 1980s. The bass drop was produced using the Roland TR-808's drum machine kick drum deep sound. Since then, the TR-808 bass drop has been incorporated into a number of electronic dance music genres, either produced by a TR-808 or using a sample of a TR-808 bass drop. The EDM drop has continued to evolve over time, circulating through different sub-genres.

== Genres ==
=== Electronic dance music ===
Many genres of EDM have more than one drop during a track, especially if the song is built on a "dance-pop" verse/chorus with vocals; a drop may be heard somewhere during each chorus as the high point of that verse/chorus cycle. Some songs tend to emphasize a single drop as the beginning of the high point, or climax, of the track; in vocal sub-genres this occurs most in the last repetition of the chorus, while in nonvocal genres it occurs in the last quarter of the track.

- In trap, the drop incorporates a dense vibration accompanied by a hard bass style.
- In pop electronic music, the drop initiates a heavy bounce effect to be used for large audiences. Billboard magazine states that in 2016, the "pop-drop" is the "...post-chorus musical interlude that blends techniques from electronic dance music to hip-hop, and it's taken the chorus' place in pop music.
- In trance, eurodance, hardstyle, hardcore, house and other dance genres where melodies and chord progressions are emphasized, it is known as a climax. This is where the main melody and accompanying beats enter with the drums and usually a syncopated bass line, giving the track a 'bouncy' feel.
- In dubstep, the drop involves a heavy full bass line and commonly a "wobble" or "vowel" bass accompanied by a strong shuffling beat. There can be emotional melodies combined with varies of common dubstep bass lines. Melodic dubstep is a sub-category under dubstep that includes powerful chords, with the use of different light melodies accompanied by the heavy bass line, to create harmonious melodies.
- Electronic music DJs sometimes perform a "double drop": beatmatching two tracks where the drop, and hence the respective climaxes of both tracks, occur at the same time.

=== Pop-drop ===
Pop-drop is an element in a pop music track which, from a traditional perspective, serves as a kind of "post-chorus interlude", but is also regarded as the new climax point in pop music songs since the mid-2010s, downgrading the chorus to a building element of the drop section. It has been described as early as December 2016 by Switched on Pop author Charlie Harding in the Billboard magazine, claiming 2016 to be "the year of the pop-drop".

Artists having included pop-drops in their songs include Rihanna and Calvin Harris's "We Found Love" (2011), Ariana Grande's "Problem" (2014), Justin Bieber's "Sorry" and "What Do You Mean?", and The Chainsmokers's "Closer" (2016).

=== Other genres ===
In hip hop, the first drop and the climax are particularly emphasized using kicks, snares, hi-hats, 808 bass line and a melodic element.

In metalcore subgenres, bass drops are often utilized under the first chord of a breakdown, to emphasize the breakdown and give it a pronounced presence. A bass drop in this genre may be done using electronic drums with a sample pad triggered by the drummer or a backing track, either of which is sent to a venue's public address system.

== Production ==
=== Tools and applications ===
In EDM, drops are created on applications such as FL Studio, Ableton, or Logic. These are digital audio workstations built with electronic music-making capabilities that allow producers and DJs to fine-tune sounds for their music. Within these applications, producers can use built-in sound kits, custom sounds, or synthesizers to create unique electronic sounds and effects.

=== Creation of the buildup and drop ===
The composition of a drop is preceded by a buildup, which is accomplished through a transition from the verse into an interlude of repeating sounds, increased drum speed, and substantial volume growth. For example, in Calvin Harris's "This is What You Came For", the buildup consists of a repeating vocal line, accompanied by a rapidly increasing snare drum tempo, and swells of synthesizers rising in volume. The repetitive vocal lines and increase in volume and tempo create tension that is broken by the full capacity of the drop. Some build-ups end with a bar of silence that adds to the dramatic flair of the drop.

The drop of a song may consist of a fuller bass, an affected vocal line, swelling atmospheric synthesizers, layered leads, hard-hitting drums, and white noise. The drop is the loudest portion of an EDM song. Buildup and verses are frequently utilized to bring focus to the drop. This is exemplified in "This is What You Came For", as the drop consists of a catchy vocal sample of the previous lyric "you" chopped up and heavily processed to create a repetitive and enchanting melody. This is complemented by a bass vox, layered house synths, and a high-hat focused drum beat. At the climax of the song, the drop in EDM diverges from the notions of pop songs that are vocal-heavy, and shifts it onto the electronic sounds.

=== Live mixing ===
Drop mixing is a transition technique which involves a sudden switch from one song to the next. There are two ways in which this can be done: "dropping on the one", where the transition occurs at the beginning of the bar, and "dropping at the four", where the transition occurs at the end of the bar. DJs use this technique at the location of the drop: the build-up of one song transitions into the break of another song. This abrupt change in melody or tempo can be used to draw the audience's attention to the performance. A similar drop technique commonly seen in trap and dubstep performances is drop swapping, where the build-ups of two songs are simultaneously played and then swapped at the climax.

== Suggested physical effects ==
=== Effects on the brain ===
The brain commonly interprets music through predictions and recognition of melodic patterns. This does not apply to a drop as it subverts musical predictability. For this reason, different regions of the brain can be stimulated more than others during a drop.

According to one study during the pre-drop, the precentral gyrus and postcentral gyrus, whose functions are related to the recognition of tempo, pitch, rhythm and intensity, show the highest level of activity. Activation in this area correlates with the formation of emotions such as tension and anticipation. A large amount of activity in the PreCG and the PostCG during the pre-drop thus reflects the listener experiencing these emotions ahead of the climax.

=== Effects on the body ===
The body's natural reaction to music is movement, mainly by means of dancing to the beat of the song. These include head and hip movements, tapping feet, and waving arms. The effects that music has on the brain stimulates the listener's tendency to dance, so a large objective of a DJ's performance is to exploit this phenomenon. In a group setting, strong musical elements such as bass lines can cause an interpersonal synchronization response where the pleasure created from music is transported to the collective movement of people. Dancing in a group can create changes in behavior, enhancing social bonds between group members and generating relaxation and euphoria.

In an EDM drop, each component of the break routine creates a different intensity peak as they vary in structure and instrumentation.
