= Héritier Watanabe =

Congolese musician and dancer (born 1982)

- Also known as: Spiritas; La Pulga Moto na tembe; La Pulga; Goga
- Born: Héritier Bondongo Kabeya; 29 August 1982 (age 44); Kinshasa, Zaire (modern-day Democratic Republic of the Congo)
- Genres: Congolese rumba; ndombolo; soukous
- Occupations: Singer; songwriter; dancer; producer; bandleader
- Instrument: Vocals
- Years active: 1996–present
- Labels: Obouo Productions; Because Music
- Formerly of: Wenge Musica Maison Mère

Héritier Bondongo Kabeya (born 29 August 1982), known professionally as Héritier Watanabe or Héritier Wata, is a Congolese singer, songwriter, dancer, producer, and bandleader. He is the founder of the Kinshasa-based orchestra Team Wata. An influential figure in fifth-generation Congolese rumba, Bondongo began singing at the age of 10 and soon joined JB Mpiana's Wenge BCBG for practice and public appearances, seeking admittance but was eventually rejected.

Bondongo gained widespread recognition after joining Werrason's Wenge Musica Maison Mère in 2001, where he co-wrote and sang on several of the band's most breakout songs, including "J'en ai assez" (2002), "Nostalgie" (2002), "Demi-Tour" (2005), "Simeon" (2006), "Confession Intime" (2008), "Sol De Mi Amor" (2008), "Par Amour" (2009), "Remise et reprise" (2011), "Le prince de la ville" (2011), "Amour vrai" (2014), and "Kimberny meilleur choix" (2014).

In 2015, Bondongo signed with Obouo Music and Because Music for his debut solo studio album, Carrière d'honneur - Retirada, which premiered the following year. His second album, Mi-ange mi-démon, released as a double-disc set, debuted with Tout simplement moi (Mi-Ange) on 18 December 2020, followed by Tout simplement moi (Mi-démon) on 26 February 2021. Bondongo's third album, Chemin de la gloire, came out on 15 March 2024, garnering 31,000 streams on Boomplay and climbing to 38th place on iTunes France's Top 50 albums.

== Early life and career ==
=== 1982–1998: Childhood, education and Wenge BCBG ===
Héritier Bondongo Kabeya was born on 29 August 1982 in Kinshasa, Zaire (now Democratic Republic of the Congo). He was raised by his mother, Mariam, in Bandalungwa and had no contact with his father due to family internal disputes. In a Radio France Internationale interview, Bondongo remarked, "I grew up between two working-class, somewhat ghetto quarters in the Congolese capital: Bandal, the birthplace of rumba, and Kintambo, the birthplace of traditional music, two styles that have guided my steps". His nickname "Watanabe" is a tribute to the famous Japanese fashion designer Junya Watanabe, who designed for the Comme des Garçons label.

He has cites Debaba, Papa Wemba, JB Mpiana, Franco Luambo, Tabu Ley Rochereau, King Kester Emeneya, and Madilu System as his early musical influences. Watanabe began singing in a choir at Saint François Parish of Kintambo at age 10, along with future actor and producer Fiston Sai Sai and soloist Patou Solo. At the age of 14, he met Papy Kakol and Fila Basele, and they would often attend rehearsals of the Kinshasa-based band Kibinda Nkoy alongside Fally Ipupa, Seguin Mignon, and Blanchard Mosaka. In 1998, Watanabe was spotted by Alain Mpela, a staff member in JB Mpiana's band Wenge BCBG, who subsequently introduced him to JB Mpiana. During his audition, he sang JB Mpiana's hits "Mulolo" and "Nazareth". Kabeya then participated in Wenge BCBG rehearsals and concerts, guided by Alain Mpela and Jules Kibens. However, his official induction into the band was deferred until he earned his diploma.

=== 1999–2014: Wenge Musica Maison Mère ===
In 1999, while Wenge BCBG and JB Mpiana were performing at the Zénith de Paris, Watanabe, who had stayed behind in Kinshasa, was fortuitously spotted by Sankara de Kunta, a companion of Werrason, who had emerged as JB Mpiana's rival following Wenge Musica's disbandment in 1997. Sankara introduced Watanabe to Werrason, who, after testing him on various songs, decided to visit his family to request permission to mentor him in Wenge Musica Maison Mère and ensure that he continued his education as his mother insisted on his completion of the baccalaureate. Alternating with his studies, he was gradually trained vocally to further mature his voice in preparation for becoming a full band member. In 2000, Wenge Musica Maison Mère was slated to perform at the Palais Omnisports de Paris-Bercy on 16 September 2000. However, during the trip, Watanabe was stranded with guitarist Patient Kusangila during a stop in Brazzaville. Upon the band's return to Kinshasa, he was involved in the preparation for Werrason's 2001 debut album Kibuisa Mpimpa, though he could not join the recordings in Europe because of his exams at the Institut Superieur d'Informatique, Programmation et Analyse (ISIPA). His vocals were instead performed by other singers. Nonetheless, he gained popularity through the band's interview recordings sold in European countries like France, Belgium, and the UK. The same year, Watanabe earned his baccalaureate in commerce and information technology and decided to devote himself entirely to music.

In 2002, when he was introduced to the public, going by the name "Héritier Gucci", he participated in Werrason and Wenge Musica Maison Mère's double sold-out concert at Zénith de Paris on 26 and 27 April at only 19 years old. He contributed to the band's studio album À La Queue Leu-Leu, which debuted on 28 December. Although he did not have a solo track, he co-wrote the song "J'en ai assez" with Celeo Scram, performed a duet with Ferré Gola on Elliot Mondombe's song "Nostalgie", and lent his voice to almost every song on the album, either as a soloist or in the chorus.

In June 2004, many key members like Ferré Gola, JDT Mulopwe, Bill Clinton Kalonji, Serge Mabiala, and others left Wenge Musica Maison Mère to form the band Les Marquis de Maison Mère in Paris. Watanabe considered following them, but in various interviews, he expressed his loyalty to Werrason, stating that he owed him too much to leave him in such a manner. Wenge Musica Maison Mère's maxi-single Alerte Générale was released on 10 December 2004, with Kabeya singing on two tracks. Alerte Générale signified the dawn of a new era for Wenge Musica Maison Mère, with Watanabe stepping up as the band's director, supported by drummer Papy Kakol. In 2005, Werrason released his second solo album, Témoignage, and Watanabe co-led the song "Demi-Tour" alongside him, filling in for the musicians who departed the previous year. In 2006, Wenge Musica Maison Mère released the maxi-single Sous-Sol, and he contributed vocals only on the track "Simeon". His popularity soared during tours, and he became recognized as the band's most prominent figure after Werrason. In 2008, Watanabe wrote two songs for the album Temps Présent (Mayi Ya Sika) - Vol. 1, titled "Confession Intime" (which was initially meant for Sous-Sol, but Werrason decided to limit the maxi-single to five songs) and "Sol De Mi Amor". That same year, Watanabe performed for the third time at Zénith de Paris with Werrason and Wenge Musica Maison Mère, where he was the only singer to deliver vocal solos before Werrason's entrance.

In 2009, the band's album Techno Malewa Sans Cesse Vol.1 was released, with Watanabe contributing the song "Par Amour". Some journalists suggest that he could attain greater success if he minimized the use of French in his songs, as the non-French-speaking population would find them easier to understand. Watanabe performed for the fourth time at the Zénith de Paris with Werrason and Wenge Musica Maison Mère in 2010. On 11 June 2011, Wenge Musica Maison Mère, Fally Ipupa, Magic System, Meiway, Jessy Matador, Patience Dabany, Coumba Gawlo, Oumou Sangaré, Sekouba Bambino, Petit Pays, Passi, Mokobé, Baaba Maal, Alpha Blondy, Manu Dibango, Mory Kanté, and other artists took part in the Nuit Africaine event at the Stade de France. That same year, Techno Malewa Suite & Fin, Vol. 1 was released, where Watanabe signed the song "Remise et reprise" and led the entire first part of "Le prince de la ville" written by Werrason. In 2014, he wrote two songs, "Amour vrai" and "Kimberny meilleur choix", for the band's studio album Flèche Ingeta.

The subsequent year, January, February, and March, were rife with rumors of Watanabe's departure, which Werrason consistently denied. In February, he held his inaugural concert without Werrason and Wenge Musica Maison Mère in Mbuji-Mayi, supported by the Airtel brand. He ultimately submitted his resignation on 8 April to the secretary-general of Wenge Musica Maison Mère. One day later, Werrason and his team reacted to Watanabe's resignation by urging him to reconsider, stating it was premature for him to launch a solo career.

== Solo career ==
=== 2015–2017: Solo career debut and Carrière d'honneur - Retirada ===
Watanabe departed Wenge Musica Maison Mère on 8 April 2015 and held a press conference on 24 April at Roméo Golf in Kinshasa to announce the beginning of his solo career. On 29 April, he held his first rehearsal with his newly formed orchestra, Team Wata, during which he was visited and supported by his former bandmate Bill Clinton Kalonji. The rehearsal took place near Zamba Playa, Werrason's rehearsal spot, and close to Ferré Gola's venue, Chez Mama Kulutu 1, 2, 3. However, after a few sessions, he relocated his rehearsals to the Kabinda Center in Kinshasa. On 12 May 2015, Watanabe went to Paris to sign a record deal with Ivorian producer David Monsoh's Obouo Music. He signed a three-album deal with Obouo Music and a 5-year distribution agreement with Because Music worth $500,000. He performed his debut solo concert at Roméo Golf with Team Wata on 3 July, becoming one of the few Congolese musicians to sell out a concert without having released an album. A CD-DVD box set of this performance was released on 5 October 2015.

In 2016, Watanabe and his producer announced his debut solo album, Carrière d'honneur - Retirada. He told Le Point that Carrière d'honneur - Retirada is a reflection of his career, and that the Spanish title signifies "retired". While producing Carrière d'honneur - Retirada, Watanabe gave a concert at Ciné Atlántico in Luanda, Angola, on 5 May 2016. Initially planned for Watanabe's 34th birthday on 29 August, the lead single "BM" was unveiled on 13 July 2016. The full album, however, was delayed until 10 November 2016, premiering in both compact disc and digital formats. The physical version of Carrière d'honneur - Retirada contained 14 tracks, while the digital release was divided into two volumes, each comprising 11 tracks. The album featured three collaborations: with Jack Lov on "Abeti Faux", with Wally Seck on "Give Me", and with Fababy on "Cala Boca". By January 2017, Carrière d'honneur - Retirada had sold 20,000 copies. Watanabe officially presented the album during an event at the Béatrice Hotel in Kinshasa on 10 February 2017 and later signed an endorsement deal with Skol beer on 25 March. To support Carrière d'honneur - Retirada, Watanabe embarked on a 12-concert tour with Team Wata in Angola in May 2017.

His first major international solo performance was scheduled for 15 July 2017 at Olympia Hall in Paris. However, just two days before the event, the venue submitted a request to the Paris Police Prefecture to cancel the concert due to threats from Combattants, a dissent faction opposed to President Joseph Kabila and Congolese musicians allied with him, who threatened to carry out a "new Bataclan" attack if Watanabe performed. Although the prefecture initially permitted the concert to proceed, imposing time restrictions and prohibiting demonstrations, disturbances on the day of the event, including vehicle fires near Place de l'Opéra, led Paris Police Prefet Michel Delpuech to cancel the show. On 7 October, he took the stage at Chez Randy Ex-treme in Ngaliema's Ma Campagne Avenue, and joined JB Mpiana on stage at his Klubb concert. Watanabe performed in South Africa in January 2018, and in March, he played two consecutive shows in Lubumbashi. He then hosted two consecutive concerts in Abidjan, performing at the Palais des Congrès of the Hôtel Ivoire on 7 September and the Palais de la Culture d'Abidjan on 8 September. His previously unreleased track, "5ème Vitesse", premiered on 18 September.

=== 2018–2023: Mi-ange mi-démon and performances ===
At the end of 2018, Watanabe revealed through Instagram that his second Congolese rumba double album would be titled Mi-ange mi-démon and was slated for release in 2019. On 26 November 2018, he released the promotional single "Reine de Saba", with the accompanying music video premiering on 11 January 2019. Despite the initial April 2019 release target, the album faced several delays, with the launch postponed to December 2019 and then further pushed to January 2020 as the final touches were made in Paris. On 11 October 2020, Watanabe announced the release of the first single from Mi-ange mi-démon, titled "Désolé", which tendered an apology for the sexual controversies and legal issues that have besmirched his public image. The single was made available on 20 October, accompanied by a music video directed by French filmmaker Chris Macari. Mi-ange mi-démon was packaged as a two-CD set. The first part, Tout simplement moi (Mi-Ange), was released on 18 December 2020, while the second part, Tout simplement moi (mi-démon), followed on 26 February 2021. Tout simplement moi (Mi-Ange) featured appearances from Reddy Amisi and Debordo Leefkunfa, while Jack Lov featured on Tout simplement moi (mi-démon). To support Mi-ange mi-démon, Watanabe presented a sold-out performance at the performing arts theater Showbuzz in Kinshasa on 16 May, where he shared the stage with Werrason.

On 12 August, Watanabe was part of the youth delegation received at the Cité de l'Union Africaine to commemorate International Youth Day. Four months later, Watanabe was selected as one of four artists by Minister of Tourism Modero Nsimba Matondo to join the 24th UNWTO General Assembly in Madrid, Spain, to showcase Congolese culture and promote the DRC as a tourist destination through his music and live acts. Afterward, he attended a reception hosted by Spain's King Felipe VI, followed by the unveiling of his single "Wosso" on 21 December. Watanabe also delivered a performance at the closing of the International Tourism Fair in Madrid on 22 January 2022, then appeared in Istanbul, Turkey, on 19 February at the Gar Musichall, and followed with a concert at Millionaire Club in Kinshasa. On 17 March, he appeared on the single "Leopards Fimbu International" to rally support for Les Léopards in the 2022 FIFA World Cup qualifiers' playoff stage, with artists Félix Wazekwa, Flaety W. Manuke, Lokua Kanza, Kadiyoyo, JB Mpiana, Barbara Kanam, Koffi Olomide, Cindy Le Cœur, Kristy Diamond, Laetitia Lokua, Adolphe Dominguez, Werrason, Lemiran LEM, Ferré Gola, and Innoss'B.

On 25 December, Watanabe took the stage at Stade des Martyrs with Team Wata, attracting a turnout of 50,000. In May 2023, he performed in Saint-Étienne with Team Wata and later appeared on fellow Congolese singer Samarino's single "Laisse les parler" on 5 November. On 6 August, Watanabe and Team Wata performed at the Esplanade Du Palais Du Peuple in Kinshasa as part of the penultimate day of the Nuits de la Francophonie event for the 9th Francophone Games. However, during their performance, Watanabe addressed the audience, conveying that their set would not proceed as expected due to a mishap involving Team Wata's key members in Equatorial Guinea and noted that he had to enlist additional musicians for the show. He then performed alongside Ferré Gola, JB Mpiana, Werrason, Félix Wazekwa, and Fabregas Le Métis Noir on 30 September at Stade Tata Raphaël during the "Célébrons le Héros" mega concert, which expressed gratitude to President Félix Tshisekedi for the successful execution of the 9th Francophone Games. On 24–25 November, Watanabe achieved two sold-out consecutive concerts in Pointe-Noire and Brazzaville.

=== 2024–2026: Chemin de la gloire, performances and collaborations ===
Watanabe began working on his third album, Chemin de la gloire, in December 2021. In August 2023, he went to Paris to finalize the album and posted on social media that Chemin de la gloire was nearing completion. The album officially debuted on 15 March 2024 as an 18-track double album dominated by Congolese rumba. Dan Kalala Kalambay of Ouragan extolled the album as an "unparalleled opus" with "impeccable sounds" and "a forged and nonsensical language". On Boomplay, Chemin de la gloire amassed 31,000 streams and climbed to the 38th spot on iTunes France's Top 50 albums chart. The breakout track "Vacances" garnered over 91,000 views, while "Le Baron" soared past 200,000 views within 24 hours. On 8 June, he showcased the album in Kinshasa with a concert featuring guest artists Gally Garvey, Innoss'B, and DJ Mombochi, and later joined Mike Kalambay onstage at his concert on 27 July at Stade des Martyrs.

On 12 September, Watanabe sold-out La Seine Musicale nine days ahead of his rescheduled concert. He performed many fan-favorites, such as "Remise et reprise", "Par amour", "Confession intime", "Racoeur", "Abeti Faux", "D de D", and "De la République". The concert featured an ensemble of guest musicians, including Sarah Solo, DJ Mombochi, and Werrason. Dan Kalala Kalambay lauded the event as a "historical show", calling Watanabe "undoubtedly an excellent dancer". On 8 November, he took the stage at Brussels' Dôme Eventhall. Wrapping up his European tour, Watanabe hosted an exclusive VIP concert titled "Le retour de Wata" on 30 November at the Hilton Hotel in Kinshasa, followed by a free performance named "Retour à la maison" on 7 December at Stade Vélodrome in Kintambo. Watanabe ended the year with concerts on 20 December at Résidence Hotel in Bukavu, 21 December at Est Métro Tunnel nightclub, and 31 December at a gala night hosted by the Hilton Hotel.

On 15 February 2025, Watanabe made a guest appearance at Werrason's concert at the Arena Grand Paris in Tremblay-en-France. On 24 May, he headlined a concert at Dôme de Paris, where fellow Congolese singer Robinio Mundibu made a surprise appearance. On 4 July, Watanabe collaborated with Labeso, Ambulance, and Malick Synthé on the single "Zala" that introduced the "Magoda" dance, which quickly became a nationwide trend through a TikTok challenge and was also popularized at one of his concerts. On 23 July, he was arrested and taken into custody at the Gombe prosecutor's office over "Zala" and the "Magoda" dance, which the CSAC claimed encouraged "moral depravity" because of its sexually suggestive and allegedly obscene movements. Watanabe had ignored earlier summonses issued by the CSAC on 3 July and by the CNCCS, which eventually resulted in his detention. Authorities also sought a social media personality known as "Tia ba Tshuba" for taking part in the viral challenge, alleging that she had violated public morality. Despite the ban, Watanabe performed the "Magoda" dance and its signature chant during the closing concert of the World Festival of Music and Tourism in Kinshasa on 19 July. On 13 February 2026, he joined more than ten Congolese musicians on Souzy Kasseya's patriotic rumba "Franc Congolais Nkolo Mabele", which promoted the use of the Congolese franc instead of foreign currencies. Later that year, on 26 June, he appeared as a guest on Yuma Dash's single "Lulendo".

Watanabe and Team Wata made their Zénith Paris concert debut on 3 July, joined on stage by Innoss'B, Serge Beynaud, Robinio Mundibu, and Kim. On 13 July, he collaborated with Laurette La Perle by guest-performing on her rumba single "Madame".

=== 2026–present: Les Évangiles ===
During an appearance on B-One Music in November 2025, Watanabe announced Les Évangiles, a collaborative album with Team Wata. He described the approximately 14-track album as a tribute to members of the group who had remained with him through the COVID-19 pandemic and other difficulties. Promotion began in June 2026 with "Altess", performed by Watanabe, Team Wata vice-president Michka Ngandu, and vocalist Arnakula, followed by the ndombolo track "Bala Bala".

== Discography ==
=== Solo ===
==== Studio albums ====
- Carrière d'honneur - Retirada (2016)
- Tout simplement moi (Mi-Ange) (2020)
- Tout simplement moi (mi-démon) (2021)
- Chemin de la gloire (2024)

==== Live albums ====
- Live au Roméo Golf Kinshasa (2015)
- Concert au Palais de la Culture Abidjan (2019)
- Tout simplement moi (Live Kinshasa Showbuzz) (2021)

==== Singles ====
- "S'il te plaît" (2017)
- "5ème Vitesse" (2018)
- "Reine de Saba" (2018)
- "Wosso" (2021)
- "Opona Nga" (2023)
- "Zala" (2025)

=== Werrason and Wenge Musica Maison Mère ===
- À La Queue Leu-Leu (2002)
- Tindika Lokito (maxi-single, 2003)
- Alerte Générale (EP, 2004)
- ..Temoignage (2005)
- Sous-Sol (EP, 2006)
- Temps Présent (Mayi Ya Sika) - Vol. 1 (2008)
- Techno Malewa Sans Cesse vol. 1 (2009)
- Techno Malewa Suite & Fin, Vol. 1 (2011)
- Satellite + 2 (2012)
- Education (2013)
- Flèche Ingeta (2014)

== Awards and nominations ==
Year	Event	Prize	Recipient	Result	Ref.
2024	Mundi Music Awards	Best MMA Favorite	Himself	Nominated	
