= Werrason =

Congolose musician (born 1965)

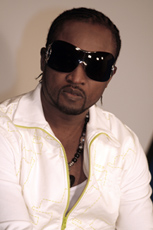
- Werrason in 2007

Background information
- Also known as: Roi De La Forêt; Phénomène; Igwe; Ambassadeur De La Paix; Vieux N'Soné; Émérite; Grand Formateur; Papa Formidable; Ya Ngiama; Ya Père Noël
- Born: Noel Ngiama Makanda; December 25, 1965 (age 60); Kikwit, Kwilu District, Congo-Leopoldville (modern-day Democratic Republic of the Congo)
- Genres: Congolese rumba; ndombolo; soukous
- Occupations: Singer; songwriter; guitarist; record producer; arranger; dancer; choreographer
- Instruments: Vocals, multiple instruments, percussion
- Years active: 1981–present
- Formerly of: Wenge Musica
- Website: Werrason Official Website

Noël Ngiama Makanda (born 25 December 1965), known professionally as Werrason, is a Congolese singer-songwriter, composer, producer, philanthropist, and the bandleader of Wenge Musica Maison Mère. He was a co-founding member of Wenge Musica, a musical group that played a pivotal role in the development of the ndombolo dance music genre during the 1990s. Often referred to as "Roi de la Forêt" ("King of the Forest"), Ngiama is widely recognized as one of the emblematic figures of Wenge Musica, with hits such as "Mulolo", "Kin É Bougé" (featuring JB Mpiana), and "Kala-Yi-Boeing".

Following Wenge Musica's disbandment in 1997 due to internal disputes between him and JB Mpiana, the band split into Wenge Musica Maison Mère, led by him, and Wenge BCBG by JB Mpiana. In December 1999, Wenge Musica Maison Mère released the ndombolo-infused album Solola Bien!, which went gold and experienced immediate success across Africa and its diaspora in France. In September 2000, Wenge Musica Maison Mère became the second African act to perform and sell out the Palais Omnisports de Paris-Bercy following Koffi Olomidé earlier that year. With a career spanning nearly four decades, Werrason has produced several successful studio albums, including seven with Wenge Musica, nine with Wenge Musica Maison Mère, and four solo studio albums. His solo releases include Kibuisa Mpimpa (2001), Témoignage (2005), Sans Poteau (2015), and 7 jours de la semaine (2017).

Aside from music, Ngiama is known for his humanitarian work. He founded the Werrason Foundation in 2000, a non-profit organization that aids orphans in the Democratic Republic of the Congo. Recognized as an "Ambassador For Peace" and "people's singer" by the United Nations Global Compact, Ngiama is an advocate for UNESCO's initiatives against AIDS and discrimination.

== Early life and career ==
=== 1965–1998: Early life, Wenge Musica, and Wenge Musica Maison Mère ===
Werrason was born Noël Ngiama Makanda on 25 December 1965 in Kikwit, Bandundu Province. He grew up in Kinshasa and began singing at the age of 12 in the choir of the Baptist Community of Congo church in Kikwit. During his youth, he also excelled in martial arts, earning the nickname "Tarzan" after winning a competition, which later evolved into his stage name, "King of the Forest" (Roi de la Forêt).

In 1979, he co-founded the band Celio Stars with school friends, serving as a vocalist alongside Aimé Buanga and Didier Masela on guitar, Machiro Kifaya and Papy Sanji on vocals, and Kija Brown. In 1981, the band was renamed Wenge Musica. While the original lineup remained, new members soon joined, including vocalists Dede Masolo, Wes Koka, and Anicet Pandu; guitarists Alain "Docteur Zing" Mwanga, Alain Makaba, and Christian Zitu; and drummers Ladins Montana, Maradona, and Evo Nsiona. In late 1982, singer JB Mpiana joined the band and brought vocalist Blaise Bula with him. Wenge Musica quickly rose to prominence, and Werrason stood out as a multi-talented artist, excelling in songwriting, dancing, and live performances. Despite the band's international success, Wenge Musica split in 1997. Werrason, along with Adolphe Dominguez and Didier Masela, formed one faction, while JB Mpiana took the majority of the remaining musicians to establish Wenge BCBG. The split was emotionally challenging for Werrason, and he found it hard to move past initially. However, the strong support from his fandom inspired him to persevere. In 1998, Werrason's faction established Wenge Musica Maison Mère (WMMM), based in Zamba Playa, Kinshasa. With the assistance of musicians such as Sankara de Kunta and Zacharie Babaswe, he conducted a nationwide search to recruit young talent. The band released its first album, Force d'Intervention Rapide, on 28 November 1998. His track "Chantal Switzerland" became a standout hit, and Bill Clinton Kalonji earned recognition as the best atalaku.

=== 1999–present: Releases and performances ===
Their second studio album, Solola Bien!, was released on 10 December 1999, under JPS Production, a Cameroonian label based in Paris and founded by Jean Pierre Saah, with distribution handled by Musisoft Distribution. Produced and arranged by Maïka Munan, the album achieved widespread success in the African music scene, earning a gold record in France with over 100,000 copies sold in Paris and millions across Africa. The hit single "Augustine" was later named one of the "Five songs that made the Congo dance" by Jeune Afrique magazine. Solola Bien! solidified Wenge Musica Maison Mère's status as one of Africa's top music groups, leading to concerts in the DRC and across the continent, and shortly afterward, Werrason became the sole leader of the band following the departure of Adolphe Dominguez and Didier Masela.

On 16 September 2000, Werrason and Wenge Musica Maison Mère sold-out the Palais Omnisports de Paris-Bercy in Paris (now Accor Arena), becoming only the second African acts to achieve this milestone after Koffi Olomide's performance earlier that same year in February. That day, Aimelia Lias, a vocalist from the rival band Wenge BCBG, joined Wenge Musica Maison Mère on stage to sing. Soon after, Werrason began working on his debut solo double album, Kibuisa Mpimpa (Opération Dragon), a project he had started during the production of Solola Bien!. During the production phase, they toured multiple European cities including Paris, Brussels, Rome, and Geneva. By May 2001, the French-language Congolese newspaper Le Phare reported that the album was nearing completion. Having finished recording in France, the band was preparing to return to Kinshasa after nearly nine months abroad. Their itinerary initially included a stop in Nairobi, but this was reportedly delayed due to growing internal friction within the band. Around this time, key members, Serge Mabiala, Japonais Okito, Jus d'Été, and Flamme Kapaya, were allegedly dissatisfied and considering leaving. The source of the tension stemmed from Werrason's decision to handle the musicians' financial shares ("quote-parts") in Kinshasa rather than overseas, which displeased some of them. This sparked a rebellion within the band, and several disgruntled members were seen heading to Roissy Airport in Paris, apparently intending to pursue other opportunities. Although Werrason managed to ease the dispute temporarily, discontent persisted. Reports indicated that Jus d'Été and Serge Mabiala planned to stay only until Kibuisa Mpimpa (Opération Dragon) was released, believing that leaving earlier might damage their popularity and lessen their share of the album's success. Meanwhile, Werrason, Héritier Watanabe, and other loyalists intensified rehearsals to prepare for potential exits and maintain the band's stability.

A major homecoming concert at Stade des Martyrs, initially slated for 26 May, was postponed to 9 June. Werrason notably donated three buses to the leading Kinshasa football clubs: Daring Club Motema Pembe, AS Vita Club, and Amicale Sportive Dragons, during the concert, which also included a tribute moment for the late President Laurent-Désiré Kabila.

Kibuisa Mpimpa (Opération Dragon) was officially released on 21 June in Paris through JPS Production. The record, divided into two volumes with 17 tracks, blended ndombolo and Congolese rumba with stylistic influences from makossa, charanga, and salsa. Kibuisa Mpimpa (Opération Dragon) features guest appearances from Manu Dibango, Nathalie Makoma, and Al Nzimbi. Among its standout songs was "Croix Rouge", a collaboration with Manu Dibango and Nathalie Makoma that delivered a message of peace and non-violence. Other notable tracks included "Destin Ya Moto", dedicated to businessman Didi Kinuani; "Obiang", reportedly written in honor of Teodoro Nguema Obiang Mangue, the son of Equatorial Guinea's president Teodoro Obiang Nguema Mbasogo, who is a close friend of Werrason. It was also supported by "Opération Dragon", "13 Ans", "Ntima Mbote", "Un Prince au Congo", "Fleur d'Amour", "Waka Waka", "Kibuisa Mpimpa", "Blandine", "Tave", "Le Grand Monsieur", "Le vent du soir", "Annie", "Nakoyamba yo", and "Evidemment". Songs from the album quickly became popular across the continent, helping to popularize the Koyimbiko shout by the band's atalaku, Celeo Scram, and a dance move where the arm follows the movement of the hips, reminiscent of driving a car. To promote Kibuisa Mpimpa (Opération Dragon), Werrason and Wenge Musica Maison Mère performed on 15 July at a fair in Lemba's Salongo garden, organized by the foundation of the late Bernardin Mungul Diaka. They subsequently appeared at the third edition of the Pan-African Music Festival (Festival panafricain de musique; FESPAM) on 6 August at the Palais du Parlement in Brazzaville, before touring to Nairobi, Mombasa, and Nakuru for concerts that had been postponed twice in July and continuing their tour with a performance in Bangui. In November, Radio France Internationale named the music video for "Opération Dragon" the Best African Video, and on 3 November in Sun City, South Africa, Werrason won two Kora Awards: Best Male Artist of Africa and Best Male Artist of Central Africa, becoming the first artist to achieve two awards in a single ceremony before, and also received a nomination for Best Arrangement of Africa. He presented these awards to President Joseph Kabila on 22 November at the Palais de la Nation.

Later that year, Werrason delivered consecutive performances at Zénith Paris. He toured Europe including London, Amsterdam, Brussels, Dublin, Rome, and Stockholm. During his world tour, performed with other African artists including Manu Dibango at the Paris Olympia, Passi, Doc Gynéco, Benji and Akil. In January 2005, the Gombe-based Cabinet EXPERTS released a Kinshasa-wide survey identifying leading public personalities of 2004 across ten categories; Werrason topped the music category with 28% of respondents citing him, well ahead of JB Mpiana, L'Or Mbongo, Koffi Olomidé, Félix Wazekwa, José Nzita, and Papa Wemba. Werrason also collaborated with Shaggy. In the same year, Werrason performed a concert at Stade des Martyrs, which was attended by over 100,000 people. In March 2010, he returned to Zénith Paris with Wenge Musica Maison Mère.

On 15 February 2025, Werrason made a triumphant return to the European stage after a 14-year hiatus with a sold-out concert at Arena Grand Paris. The event attracted a vast audience and featured Wenge Musica Maison Mère and their dancers, with performances of iconic hits such as "Solola Bien" and "Techno Malewa". Former bandmates, including Bill Clinton Kalonji and Héritier Watanabe, joined him on stage, and a live album featuring 12 selected songs from the night was later released on 16 April. On 27 February, he took part in a peaceful march in Paris, denouncing the M23 campaign in eastern DRC alongside members of the Congolese diaspora. He later performed at Brussels' Couleur Café festival on 28 June. On July 18, he was part of the closing event of the first World Music and Tourism Festival (Festival Mondial de la Musique et du Tourisme) at the Palais du Peuple in Kinshasa, organized by the Congolese government with assistance from UN Tourism.

On 18 October, Werrason and Wenge Musica Maison Mère sold-out the Adidas Arena in Paris. As reported by the Agence Congolaise de Presse, the concert brought a wave of nostalgia, accentuated by high-energy renditions of their biggest hits. Special guests included former bandmates Manda Chante, Deplick Pomba, and Brigade Sarbaty.

== Feuds ==
=== JB Mpiana and Wenge BCBG ===
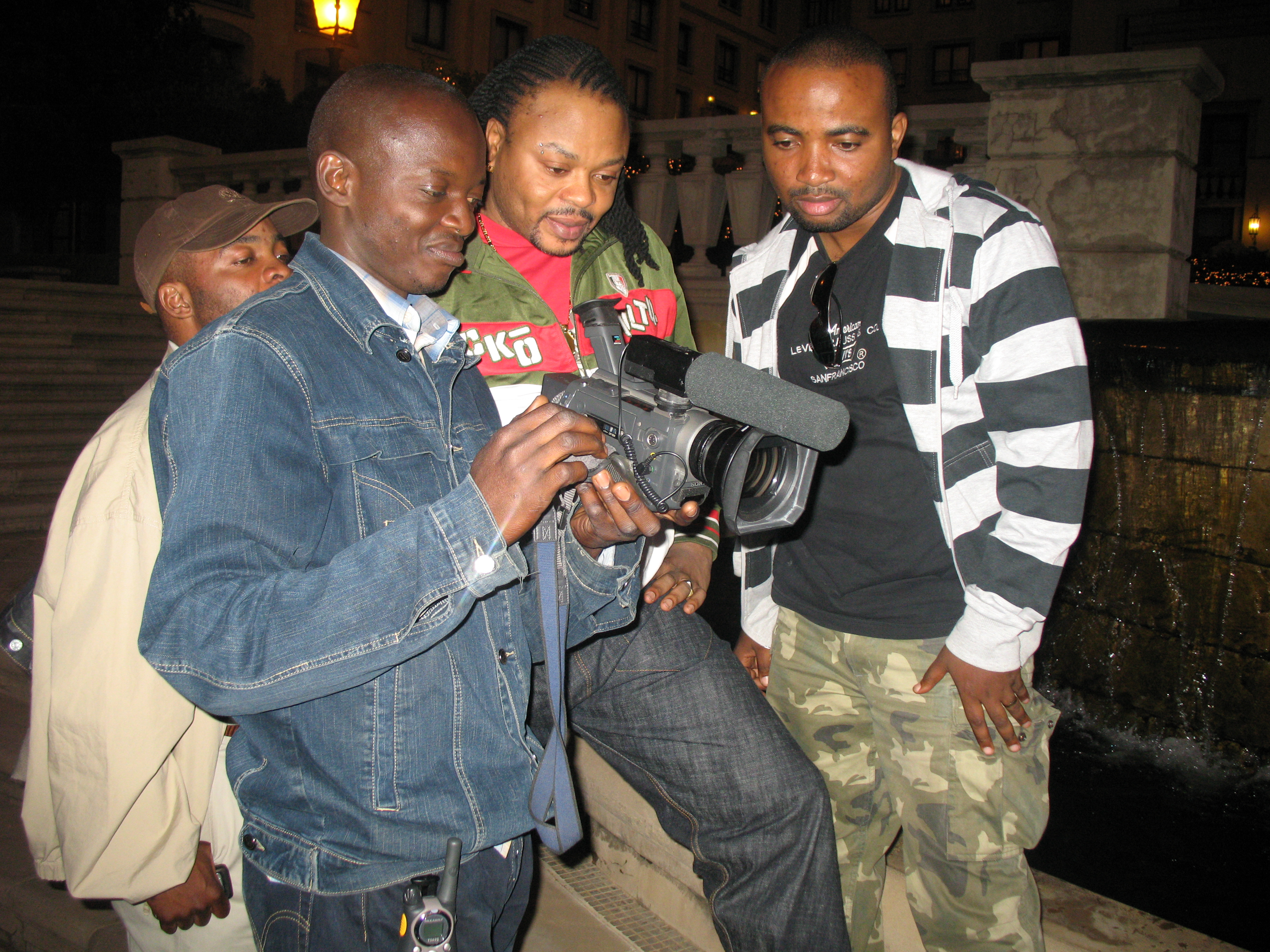
JB Mpiana (middle, dressed red and green) in 2007

==== Origins and early violent clashes between factions ====
The feud between Werrason and JB Mpiana began after the disbandment of Wenge Musica in December 1997. Werrason went on to establish Wenge Musica Maison Mère, while JB Mpiana formed Wenge BCBG. According to Claude Kamanga Mutond, a correspondent for the Congolese newspaper Le Phare, Werrason's success with his new band transformed him into a national icon. His popularity stirred heated debates among fans in the streets and in the press, often sparking confrontations with supporters of JB Mpiana and Wenge BCBG. Kamanga noted that the once-brotherly musicians had become enemies, and their fandoms mirrored this enmity. On 6 June 2001, tensions between their respective atalaku, Gentamycine from Wenge BCBG and Sankara de Kunta from Wenge Musica Maison Mère, nearly turned violent during an encounter at the Interconnect agency while they were handling customs matters. Witnesses saw the pair trade insults, and the situation almost escalated into a fight before bystanders managed to intervene. A few days earlier, during a concert by Adolphe Dominguez's Wenge Tonya Tonya at Collège Saint Georges in Kintambo, Papy Kakole and Thierry "Synthé" of Wenge Musica Maison Mère allegedly tried to disrupt the show by performing provocatively atop their cars near the venue. In response, Didier Lacoste of Wenge Tonya Tonya retaliated by organizing performances in the neighborhoods of the two agitators. The discord extended beyond the musicians themselves; on 29 May, the family home of Richard Mukena, a Wenge BCBG singer, was pelted with stones by enraged supporters of Wenge Musica Maison Mère. They believed Mukena had caused the arrest of the Wenge Musica Maison Mère's popular atalaku Bill Clinton. However, investigations later revealed that the arrested individual was Joli Molanda, a Wenge Maison Mère fan, who had been detained following a complaint filed by Mukena for misconduct. To ease tensions, the police released Molanda.

==== Media, musical competition, and ethnic/fanbase divisions ====
On 8 July 2001, three members each from Wenge Musica Maison Mère and Wenge BCBG engaged in a heated exchange of insults on the television program Boulevard des Stars on Raga TV, which escalated into a showdown between Werrason and JB Mpiana. This rivalry frequently manifests through verbal assaults, metaphorically known as mabanga (stones), sharp, cutting words flung by the musicians themselves. Musically, Werrason marked a significant achievement with his sold-out concert at the Palais Omnisports de Paris-Bercy on 16 September 2000 and subsequently released the album Kibuisa Mpimpa (Opération Dragon). Meanwhile, JB Mpiana launched his album TH (Toujours Humble) and was working on a new project titled Internet. While TH (Toujours Humble)'s debut "caused massive traffic jams", Kibuisa Mpimpa (Opération Dragon)'s release was met with a more moderate reception. The competition between these albums and the artists' ongoing feud fuel the verbal attacks and personal barbs that affect their fans and sometimes lead to physical altercations off-screen. The rivalry also mirrors ethnic and regional loyalties, with fans from Kongo Central and Bandundu generally supporting Werrason, whereas JB Mpiana drew most of his followers from the Kasaï provinces. JB Mpiana's supporters largely occupied the affluent western communes of Kinshasa, while Werrason's base was among the working-class areas, especially Masina, where JB Mpiana once narrowly avoided an assault. The local press capitalized on the animosity, used it to drive sales and audience numbers. Numerous short-lived but profitable music magazines and television programs sprang up, thriving on the controversy.

==== 2002 public reconciliation attempt ====
On 26 January 2002, during a state dinner at the Grand Hôtel de Kinshasa marking President Joseph Kabila's first year in office, the two musicians shook hands in front of the public, an act many media outlets hailed as a landmark reconciliation. Yet the positive gesture was undermined by Werrason's fandom, who began circulating unfounded claims. Shortly afterward, JB Mpiana slipped and fell on the stairs at the Atmosphère nightclub. Rumors spread that Werrason had caused the fall through "mystical" means, an allegation used to question the sincerity of the reconciliation. Others compared the situation to political peace efforts that fail to deliver absolute unity, implying the handshake lacked meaning. JB Mpiana later addressed the matter on television, confirming that he had fallen and expressing gratitude to those who helped him. He emphasized that he sees Werrason as a brother, with their only rivalry being professional and amicable. He condemned attempts to inflame tensions and said he forgave anyone who had wished him harm.

== Philanthropy ==
In 2000, Werrason founded the Werrason Foundation, which provides provides support to orphans and at-risk children in the Democratic Republic of the Congo, running a farm that accommodates over 400 young people. The foundation also offers assistance to street children, schools, prisons, and hospitals. Recognized as an "Ambassador For Peace" and "people's singer" by the United Nations Global Compact, Werrason was received by Pope John Paul II in 2001. He also champions UNESCO's campaigns against HIV/AIDS and discrimination.

== Controversies ==
In September 2021, the Parisian prefecture announced the cancellation of a large concert of Werrason which was to be held at the Zénith of Paris, citing "risks of serious disturbances to the public order and of attacking the safety of the spectators", in particular with threats of the demonstrations of radical opponents to the regime in place. Werrason has expressed his anger towards France.

== Discography ==
=== Albums ===
- 2001: Kibuisa Mpimpa
- 2005: Témoignage
- 2008: Simply The Best Of, Vol. 1
- 2015: Sans Poteau
- 2017: 7 Jours de la Semaine

=== Singles ===
- 2013: "I Found a Way" (feat. Mohombi)
- 2014: "Block Cadenas"
- 2017: "Diemba (Balançoire Générique)"
- 2019: "Formidable"
- 2020: "Yeke Yeke" (feat. Bikorine & But Na Filet)

Featured in

- 2021: "RDV" (Picolcrist bil feat. Werrason)

== Awards and nominations ==
| Year | Event | Prize | Recipient | Result | Ref. |
|---|---|---|---|---|---|
| 2001 | Kora Awards | Best Male Artist of Africa | Himself | Won | |
| 2001 | Kora Awards | Best Male Artist of Central Africa | Himself | Won | |
| 2001 | Kora Awards | Best Arrangement of Africa | Himself | Nominated | |
| 2001 | Association des Chroniqueurs de Musique du Congo | Best Artist | Himself | Won | |
| 2001 | Association des Chroniqueurs de Musique du Congo | Best Album | Kibuisa Mpimpa (Opération dragon) | Won | |
| 2001 | Association des Chroniqueurs de Musique du Congo | Best Song | "Blandine" | Won | |
| 2001 | Association des Chroniqueurs de Musique du Congo | Best Composer | Himself | Won | |
| 2001 | Association des Chroniqueurs de Musique du Congo | Best Orchestra | Wenge Musica Maison Mère | Won | |
| 2002 | Association des Chroniqueurs de Musique du Congo | Event of the Year | 2002 Zénith Paris concert | Won | |
| 2002 | Kundé | Best Central African Artist | Himself | Won | |
| 2003 | Kora Awards | Best Male Artist of Central Africa | Himself | Nominated | |
| 2004 | Kora Awards | Best Central African Male | (with Félix Wazekwa) | Won | |
| 2004 | Kora Awards | Best Male African Artist | Himself | Won | |
| 2005 | Kora Awards | Best Male Artist of Central Africa | Himself | Won | |
| 2014 | Kundé | Best Central African Artist | Himself | Won | |
| 2024 | Mundi Music Awards | Best Legendary Artist of the Year | Himself | Nominated | |
| 2024 | Mundi Music Awards | Best Phenomenal Artist | Himself | Nominated | |
| 2026 | AFRIMA | Best African Dance/Choreography | "Tout se paie ici bas" | Nominated | |
