= Wenge Musica Maison Mère =

Congolese musical band

- Origin: Kinshasa, Democratic Republic of the Congo
- Genres: Ndombolo; soukous
- Labels: JPS (1997–2003); Diego Music (2009–2012); Werrason World (since 2013)
- Members: Werrason; Papy Kakol
- Past members: Ferré Gola; Héritier Watanabe; Bill Clinton Kalonji; Celeo Scram; Baby Ndombe; JDT Mulopwe; Didier Lacoste; Adjani Sesele; Serge Mabiala; Didier Masela; Adolphe Dominguez; Japonais Maladi; Flamme Kapaya; Mimiche Bass; Aimelia Lias; Kabose Bulembi; Jitrous Galliano; Eboa Lotin; Roi David; Kene Kene; Bonbon Kojak; Cappuccino LBG; Tadde De Monticule; Miel De Son; Oliveira; Brigade Sarbati; Prince D'Angola; Lobeso Tigre; Diego Cao; Deplick Pomba; Fabregas le Métis Noir; Robinio Mundibu

Wenge Musica Maison Mère, also spelled as WMMM, is a musical band founded in December 1997, by musicians Werrason, Didier Masela and Adolphe Dominguez, after the split of their original band, Wenge Musica, created in 1981. Since its foundation, the band has had a rivalry with former bandmate JB Mpiana's Wenge BCBG. Under the leadership of Werrason, the group developed stars such as vocalists Ferré Gola, Héritier Watanabe, Fabregas le Métis Noir and Bill Clinton Kalonji. The band faced its first split after Ferré, Bill Clinton and JDT Mulopwe left the band to found Les Marquis de Maison Mère in 2004.

== History ==
=== Formation ===
==== 1997–1999: Feud, Wenge Musica split, and Wenge Musica Maison Mère ====
In 1997, after the release of then-Wenge Musica vocalist JB Mpiana's Feux de l'Amour, the band's members started to develop a feud amongst themselves. In a concert in the GHK, the band began infighting, and according to some rumors, Werrason and JB Mpiana, fought onstage. All those in attendance were shocked, including Papa Wemba, who was a special guest of the band. The band split on 7 December 1997.

A couple of weeks later, on 20 December 1997, Werrason, Didier Masela, and Adolphe Dominguez, all former members of the newly-disbanded Wenge Musica, formed Wenge Musica Maison Mère. At its foundation, the band received the support from King Kester Emeneya, Koffi Olomidé, and Marie-Paul Kambulu. Later on, they recruited musicians such as Baby Ndombe, JDT Mulopwe, Didier Lacoste, Serge Mabiala, Adjani, and Ferré Gola, who came from JB Mpiana's Wenge BCBG. In 1997, the band had its first performance on the RTNC, the Congo's national TV channel. A year later, their debut album, Force d'Intervention Rapide, was released after having been signed to JPS Production, a Paris-based Cameroonian label founded by Jean Pierre Saah, with distribution provided by Musisoft Distribution. The album had the remix of "Kala-Yi-Boeing", a 1993 hit by Wenge Musica, composed by Werrason, and the Congolese rumba-infused hit "Chantal Switzerland".

==== 1999–2000: Solola Bien!, Bercy concert, and Terrain Eza Miné ====
Wenge Musica Maison Mère released their second studio album, Solola Bien!, on 10 December 1999 through JPS Production. According to the band's fandom, the phrase Solola bien, meaning "speak properly", was aimed at JB Mpiana and Wenge BCBG amid their escalating rivalry. Solola Bien! was produced and arranged by Maïka Munan and became a significant success across the African music market, earning a gold record in France from SACEM after selling more than 100,000 copies in Paris and millions throughout Africa. It was supported by Werrason's "Solola Bien", Ferré Gola's "Vita-Imana", and Werrason's "Augustine", the latter of which was later recognized by Jeune Afrique as one of the "Five songs that made the Congo dance". The success of Solola Bien! boosted Wenge Musica Maison Mère's reputation as a premier African band.

On 16 September 2000, the band sold out the Palais Omnisports de Paris-Bercy (now the Accor Arena), making them only the second African act to do so, following Koffi Olomidé's achievement earlier that February. During the event, Aimelia Lias, a singer from rival band Wenge BCBG, appeared on stage to perform with them. On 28 November, following the success of Force d'Intervention Rapide and Solola Bien!, the band released a remix album, Terrain Eza Miné, through Ets Ndiaye. Shortly afterward, Werrason became the band's sole leader when Adolphe Dominguez and Didier Masela left the band. Masela re-created Wenge Musica, and Dominguez founded Wenge Tonya Tonya.

=== 2001–2002: Kibuisa Mpimpa (Opération Dragon), awards, recognition, and internal tensions ===
On 21 June 2001, Werrason's first solo album, Kibuisa Mpimpa (Opération Dragon), was released. The album is widely regarded as a classic within soukous music. The double album includes guest appearances from Manu Dibango, Nathalie Makoma, and Déesse Mukangi. Shortly after the album's debut, Wenge Musica Maison Mère's lead guitarist, Burkina Faso Mboka Liya, exited the band following a dramatic incident at the Grand Hôtel de Kinshasa (now Pullman Kinshasa Grand Hôtel), where Werrason slapped him just before performing the song "Muana 13 ans" because he was seen chatting on his phone instead of concentrating. Feeling insulted by the subsequent suspension, Burkina Faso opted to leave despite Werrason's attempts to keep him in the band. Songs from the album gained widespread popularity across Africa, boosting the fame of the Koyimbiko, a signature shout by the band's atalaku, Celeo Scram, and a dance move that mimics steering a car, moving the arm in sync with the hips. To promote Kibuisa Mpimpa (Opération Dragon), Wenge Musica Maison Mère performed on 15 July at a fair in Lemba's Salongo garden, organized by the foundation of the late Bernardin Mungul Diaka. They subsequently appeared at the third edition of the Pan-African Music Festival (Festival panafricain de musique; FESPAM) on 6 August at the Palais du Parlement in Brazzaville, before touring to Nairobi, Mombasa, and Nakuru for concerts that had been postponed twice in July and continuing their tour with a performance in Bangui. On 3 November, Werrason won two Kora Awards: Best Male Artist of Africa and Best Male Artist of Central Africa, becoming the first artist to achieve two awards in a single ceremony before, and also received a nomination for Best Arrangement of Africa. The promotional tour followed, with concerts on 1 December at Camp Luka in Ngaliema and 2 December at Planète Jupiter in Gombe, before launching a Zambian tour featuring three major shows. That same month, reports surfaced claiming atalaku Adjani Sesele, known for mimicking Didier Lacoste's voice on "Blandine", had left the band to join Dakumuda New-Man's Laviniora Esthétique. However, Werrason's associates dismissed the allegations, clarifying that Adjani had only paid a friendly visit and never intended to join the rival band. They also denounced a television clip allegedly showing Adjani rehearsing with Laviniora Esthétique, calling it manipulated footage meant to tarnish Wenge Musica Maison Mère and Werrason's image. Despite his absence from the band's 1 December concert at the YMCA, organized in honor of Bana Kin's reception of their president, Vice-Governor Godard Motemona Gibolum, Adjani was said to have promised to rejoin the band only after publicly denying the rumors. Meanwhile, people linked to Dakumuda's entourage maintained that Adjani had already signed with Laviniora Esthétique but concealed it out of fear of reprisal from Wenge Musica Maison Mère's fandom, who monitored his public appearances closely. Adjani reportedly remained torn, having neither officially departed Wenge Musica Maison Mère nor fully committed to Laviniora Esthétique.

Despite these issues, Wenge Musica Maison Mère achieved significant recognition from the Association of Music Journalists of Congo (Association des Chroniqueurs de Musique du Congo; ACMCO), earning awards for Best Orchestra, Best Star (Werrason), Best Album (Kibuisa Mpimpa (Opération Dragon)), Best Song ("Blandine"), Best Composer (Werrason), Best Singer (Ferre Gola), and Best Host/Presenter (Bill Clinton Kalonji). They then performed in Malabo, Equatorial Guinea, for New Year's celebrations, then returned to Kinshasa for a double production at Stade des Martyrs in March 2002, aiming to surpass JB Mpiana and Wenge BCBG's December 2001 attendance record of 135,000. However, in February, Wenge Musica Maison Mère experienced internal tensions leading up to their planned two-day concert on 8–9 May 2002 at the Zénith Paris. Key members, including Ferre Gola, Jus d'Été, Bill Clinton Kalonji, and Celeo Scram, posed challenges for Werrason due to mood swings and disciplinary issues. They were formally reprimanded and promised loyalty, but problems persisted. Adjani, for example, arrived late to rehearsal and was sent home immediately. Jus d'Été remained suspended for a month after refusing to travel to Equatorial Guinea for the New Year celebrations, and his suspension had not yet been lifted. Ferre Gola also grew increasingly anxious, fearing he might lose Werrason's favor and worrying about his status in the band. On 9 February, they performed at the Palais du Peuple to honor the victims of the Nyiragongo volcano eruption in Goma.

The Zénith Paris concert was rescheduled from 8–9 May to 26–27 April for administrative and logistical reasons, creating a scheduling conflict with former members of Empire Bakuba and confusing fans about which band would take precedence. Other administrative challenges included repeated lateness and discipline issues from Adjani, Serge Mabiala, and soloist Japonais, who were given verbal warnings but later forgiven and included in the team. To prevent defections, Werrason required all musicians to sign loyalty contracts. Meanwhile, the WMMM's junior band, Opération Dragons, continued to perform in Kinshasa. The event was organized by Félix Petit, who had successfully staged other large Congolese shows in the venue. The band rehearsed intensively at Nzamba Playa, conducting full-day sessions while Werrason evaluated around 50 new dancers under Jeanne Bête Sauvage's supervision. Their European tour departed with a team of 85 people, including 35 performers. Before officially beginning the tour, they performed a private show in Brazzaville, then sold out both Zénith concerts, becoming the first band of their generation to do so. According to Joseph Kanka of Le Phare, the Zénith concerts established Congolese music's dominance on the African continent. After the two Zénith dates, they continued the tour with concerts in London; two benefit concerts at the Palais des Beaux-Arts in Brussels dedicated to victims of the Nyiragongo eruption; and other performances in Geneva, Stockholm, Bonn, Liège, Lausanne, and Berlin.

During the London stop, a member named Lumumba unexpectedly left the band without notifying Werrason, causing concern among his entourage; nevertheless, Werrason was unfazed. Rumors also circulated about internal disputes, as Ferré Gola allegedly flouted band regulations and encouraged Serge Mabiala, Bill Clinton Kalonji, Japonais, and Kabosé Bulembi to contest Werrason over tour revenue distribution. Ferré reportedly viewed young tenor Héritier Watanabe, who could imitate his voice flawlessly, as a potential rival and feared being replaced as lead singer, and he was said to have sold his Mercedes vehicle before the tour, which some interpret as a prelude to quietly leaving with a band with friends to form his own band. Amid these rumors, Japonais was reportedly suspended indefinitely for absenteeism from rehearsals and concerts. During the Liège stop, Adjani chose to travel straight to Brussels rather than remain with the band. Werrason's disciplinary committee issued warnings to Adjani and Serge Mabiala, urging them to improve their behavior and respect the band's code of conduct.

=== Late 2002–2003: À La Queue Leu-Leu (Koyimbi Ko!), performances, internal tensions, and Tindika Lokito ===
WMMM began recording their third studio album during their European tour and established a new headquarters in Brussels. By July 2002, the album was expected to include around fifteen tracks and was tentatively titled Koyimbiko, after a Kongo dance also known as Ngwashi or Makolo pente, with contributions from Werrason and other members. In August 2002, the album was retitled À la Queue Leu Leu, and during the same month, Adjani and Serge Mabiala were reportedly absent from the recording sessions for nearly a month, appearing only sporadically in Paris and Brussels, while Japonais submitted an appeal to lift his indefinite suspension. The album's release, initially scheduled for October 2002, was preceded by the brief detention of Werrason and several band members in Brussels on 6 August following an anonymous denunciation alleging drug trafficking and pimping. The accusations were never substantiated, and Werrason was released after approximately four hours. An intervention by the Congolese Ministry of Culture, the band's legal team, and the DRC's ambassador resulted in the release of the remaining detainees and the extension of their visas. By September, the album was reportedly near completion and slated for release in late December 2002. Guitarist and songwriter Do Akongo, who had worked with WMMM as a session musician, was initially hesitant to provide extra compositions, but Elliot Mongombe persuaded him to join the recording sessions. Around the same time, Didier Lacoste left Wenge Tonya Tonya to join the band.

WMMM returned to Kinshasa on 21 December, and the album, finally titled À La Queue Leu-Leu (Koyimbi Ko!), was released on 28 December as a double album, containing 17 tracks that blended Congolese rumba, ndombolo, soukous, and charanga. It marked the band's first album where nearly all members contributed original songs, with notable tracks including contributions from Werrason ("Ligne 11", "Salsister", "Fany", "Calmement"), Flamme Kapaya ("Yandi Mosi W.R."), Baby Ndombe ("Mama Mabe"), Ali Mbonda ("Ma Personnalité"), Elliot Mongombe ("Nostalgie", performed as a duet by Ferré Gola and Héritier Watanabe), Céléo Scram ("J'en Ai Assez"), Ferré Gola ("Chetani" and "Victime D'Amour"), Bill Clinton Kalonji ("Style Moomberg"), Aimelia Lias ("Effet Placebo"), JDT Mulopwe ("Examen"), Bamba Munkir Criss ("Détournement"), Papy Kakol ("Nasilisi Maloba"), and Kabosé Bulembi ("Jugement Dernier"). À La Queue Leu-Leu (Koyimbi Ko!) was the band's last release with JPS Productions. Its initial distribution faced difficulties due to poorly duplicated cassette tapes from Brazzaville's Ndiaye studio, which temporarily imperiled the band's reputation, but after rectification, the album achieved great success, topping the charts in Kinshasa.

To celebrate their return and the album release, they sold out Stade des Martyrs on 4 January 2003, with Opération Dragon opening the concert and Werrason, Ferré, Jus d'Été, Baby, Kabosé, Héritier, Bill Clinton, Céléo, and Aimelia present, while Adjani, Serge Mabiala, and Japonais were absent. During this time, Gianfranco from Wenge Tonya Tonya joined WMMM. The band then collaborated on the album Anti Balles with Adricha Tipo Tipo, featuring vocals by Lacoste, Ferré, Héritier Watanabe, JDT Mulopwe, Jus d'Été, non-member Djene Djento, and instrumental performances by atalaku Bill Clinton and guitarist Flamme Kapaya. In March 2003, Werrason suspended Céléo for two months due to repeated misconduct, including mistreatment of fans, provoking rival musicians, and involvement in several fights, with the final incident at a fan club meeting causing injuries and prompting Werrason to publicly announce the suspension. The band later performed in Libreville, Gabon, invited by the Fondation Horizons Nouveaux, led by Edith Lucie Bongo, and signed a partnership to support social and humanitarian projects in Gabon and the DRC. In June 2003, Werrason further suspended Jus d'Été indefinitely and Héritier and Ali Mbonda for a month for failing to participate in the band's three-day trip to Cameroon, though Ali Mbonda was later reinstated after appealing. According to spokesperson Jules Masa, the disciplinary actions were due to repeated offenses, including Héritier's verbal outbursts toward the marketing director of Monib Production and Jus d'Été's complaints about accommodations in Gabon. In July 2003, WMMM performed at the Stade Sébastien Charléty in Paris as part of their European tour, which included stops in Brussels, Liège, Lille, Lyon, Geneva, Lausanne, and Amsterdam, and they later won awards from the Association des Chroniqueurs de Musique du Congo for Best Orchestra, Event of the Year for Werrason's second concert at Zénith Paris, and Best Star for Werrason. They then participated in the fourth edition of Pan-African Music Festival (FESPAM), from 2–8 August 2003 in Brazzaville.

In September, some WMMM fans confronted Ferré at Zamba Playa, suspecting he was receiving special treatment, such as being allowed to travel alone to Europe, at the same time that Aimelia's promotion to rehearsal chief and disciplinary officer caused further strain within the band. Meanwhile, guitarist Thierry Mogratana left Papa Wemba's Nouvelle Écriture and was seen joining WMMM just as the band prepared for a London tour. On 11 October, WMMM embarked on a London tour with 21 people (17 musicians and four dancers), leaving Baby and Adjani in Kinshasa due to indiscipline, as Adjani frequently missed rehearsals and concerts and often arrived late, while Baby opposed Aimelia's promotion and refused to participate in music journalist Serge Kayembe's 10-year career celebration, angering Werrason enough to remove him from the travel list. Ferré narrowly escaped the same fate after his mother personally appealed to Werrason on his behalf, and after the band performed in London on 18 and 25 October before continuing to Angola via Kinshasa, Adjani was pardoned during the Angolan tour. At this time, Wenge Musica Maison Mère released a two-track maxi-single, Tindika Lokito, which featured the title track, used in a Skol beer promotion, and "Allez À L'Ecole". "Tindika Lokito", composed by Werrason, broadened ndombolo's popularity across Central Africa, Francophone West Africa, East Africa, and into the continent's diaspora in France and Belgium, and by December 2003 À La Queue Leu-Leu (Koyimbi Ko!) earned them a nomination for Best African Video at the Kora Awards while Werrason received a nomination for Best Male Artist.

=== 2004–2009: Miracle, Témoignage, Alerte générale, other releases and performances ===
In mid-2003, WMMM announced plans for a forthcoming album entitled Miracle. In December 2003, it was clarified that Miracle would be Werrason's second solo studio album, comprising ten tracks, with a planned 2004 release. A European tour in March 2004 included Paris, London, Brussels, Geneva, and Berlin, where the album was promoted; however, its release was delayed. Another European tour was announced for September 2004, with a 25-member ensemble traveling to Paris, Brussels, Sweden, Norway, and North America to help finance the album's production; however, visa restrictions prevented the tour from taking place. The success of Tindika Lokito earned Werrason consecutive Kora Awards in December 2004 for Best Male African Artist and Best Central African Male. Amid internal disputes, emerging members such as Ferré Gola, Bill Clinton Kalonji, JDT Mulopwe, and Japonais departed to establish Les Marquis de Maison Mère and released their debut album Miracles (Faites Vos Prières) that year. After the split, Werrason recruited younger musicians, including atalaku Roi David and J. Trois.

Serge Mabiala, who had remained in Europe during the À La Queue Leu-Leu (Koyimbi Ko!) sessions and had also contributed to Miracles (Faites Vos Prières), reportedly informed Werrason that he would not return to Kinshasa due to unresolved personal issues. Journalist Martin Enyimo of Le Potentiel noted that, unlike other departing members, Mabiala refrained from making inflammatory remarks about Werrason, and he eventually rejoined the band in February 2005 to work on Miracle, which had been retitled from Miracle to Témoignage des Miracles and later released as Témoignage, a twelve-track album issued on 20 December 2005. Before this, on 10 December 2004, WMMM released the maxi-single Alerte générale through Ets Ndiaye and distributed by Sonima Music. Alerte générale featured exclusively Werrason's compositions with arrangements by Seck Bidens and Philippe Guez. The ndombolo-infused eponymous track quickly became popular across Africa and sparked a dance craze called "sele ba mama sele", in which women turn their backs to the audience, bend over, and wiggle their waists in time with the music while the singer comments, often with obscene lyrics, on their physical features. Wonder Guchu of the Herald noted that the dance gained prominence in Zimbabwe after Monica "Mama Sele" Chikasha popularized it at Tongai Moyo and Alick Macheso concerts, and the presence of Congolese musicians in some Zimbabwean bands helped cement its appeal.

On 5 February 2005, WMMM embarked on their European tour, performing in Lyon, Liège, Brussels, Paris, Frankfurt, Toulouse, Cologne, London, Dublin, and Zurich. They also took part in the fifth edition of FESPAM, held from 9 to 16 July in Brazzaville, Pointe-Noire, and Kinshasa. Between 2006 and 2008, they released another maxi-single and one album, Sous-Sol was the first disc by Werrason with a "world music" style. The album Mayi ya Sika contained 2 volumes. It was released in May 2008.

On 8 November 2008, the band played in the Zenith Paris for the third time, with guests including Youssoupha.

In 2009, the dance Techno Malewa became immensely popular in Kinshasa's streets. It was released in the albums Techno Malewa Sans Cesse and Techno Malewa Suite et Fin (released in 2010), which placed No. 2 on the Congolese Hit Parade (#1 was Bande Annonce by Zaïko Langa Langa).

=== 2010s ===
WMMM played for the fourth time in the Zénith Paris on 13 November 2010. They were invited to play in the Stade de France with fellow Congolese singers Fally Ipupa and Jessy Matador.

In 2011, with WMMM, Techno Malewa suite & fin is released

In 2014, another Werrason solo album, Flêche Ingéta, is released in December 2014 in Paris, and January 2015 in Kinshasa.

In 2017, they recruited Sarah Solo, a Congolese female guitarist, who played in Diemba (Balançoire). After the song was released as a single, in November 2017, 7 Jours De La Semaine was released.

After recruiting singers and instrumentalists, in 2019, the album Formidable was released under Werrason's own label, Werrason World.

In 2021, Werrason and his band announced their return to the Zénith Paris, in June. The concert was reported for the first time on 17 September 2021. By the week of the concert, the group did not have visas. For the second time the concert was reported, on 25 September. The cancellation of the concert was announced later. Days later, Werrason declared at a press conference that he believes "it is an injustice and that his concert was sabotaged by the French authorities."

== Legal issues ==
=== 2002 Brussels arrest incident ===
On 6 August 2002, Werrason and several Wenge Musica Maison Mère members were detained by police in Brussels, Belgium. Those arrested included band members Bill Clinton Kalonji, Ferré Gola, Baby Ndombe, Thierry Synthé, and Ali Mbonda, as well as two non-musician members of the band's support committee, Rodjani and Elliot Mongombe. The detentions followed an anonymous denunciation alleging drug trafficking and pimping, claims that were widely repeated in regional media but ultimately left unsubstantiated. Werrason was held for approximately four hours before being released the same day. Belgian authorities described the procedure as a routine control that culminated in a lengthy interrogation, and no evidence was uncovered to support the accusations. Speaking to BBC News, Werrason expressed bewilderment, saying, "I don't understand anything. I am the Ambassador of Peace.....I have never been involved in drug trafficking. My lawyer is looking into the situation and will inform me of the charges against me". While Werrason was released quickly, several members of his entourage remained in pre-trial detention in Belgium for several days. The incident sparked significant unrest among Congolese communities in Belgium and the Democratic Republic of the Congo. In Ixelles, Brussels, supporters held public demonstrations to protest what they viewed as the degrading treatment of the musician. In Kinshasa, protests formed outside the Belgian Embassy, led mainly by shégués (street children) and Wenge Musica Maison Mère fandom. Band representatives, including Deputy Secretary-General Papy Kabemba and Monib Production from the management team, met with embassy officials. Belgian diplomats requested that they help calm the crowds and await official communication, though protests continued into the evening at locations such as Samba Playa in central Kinshasa.

On 8 August, the Congolese Minister of Culture and the Arts, Marthe Ngalula Wafuana, met with the Belgian chargé d'affaires, Frédéric Meurice, to address the diplomatic tensions arising from the incident, after which Meurice publicly clarified that Werrason was not facing any legal charges, stating that "Ngiama Werrason is not at all under any legal threat". He explained that the only pending matter involved expired visas for some musicians, which Belgian authorities were working to resolve administratively. Werrason maintained that Musica Maison Mère members held valid work permits and that the visas were initially set to expire in October 2002, meaning their European tour could proceed without disruption. Congolese media outlets and people close to Werrason suggested that the accusations may have been part of a deliberate attempt to destabilize the band, citing jealousy over their rising international success, although these claims were never substantiated. Efforts by the Congolese Ministry of Culture, the band's legal representatives, and the DRC's Ambassador to Belgium led to the resolution of the administrative issues. The detained musicians were released, and Belgian authorities agreed to extend their visas, reversing initial plans to expel them.

== Awards and nominations ==
Year	Event	Prize	Recipient	Result	Ref.
2001	Association des Chroniqueurs de Musique du Congo	Best Song	"Blandine"	Won	
2001	Association des Chroniqueurs de Musique du Congo	Best Orchestra	Wenge Musica Maison Mère	Won	
2002	Association des Chroniqueurs de Musique du Congo	Event of the Year	2002 Zénith Paris concert	Won	
2003	Kora Awards	Best African Video	__	Nominated	

== Discography ==
=== Studio albums ===
- 1998: Force d'Intervention Rapide
- 1999: Solola Bien!
- 2002: À La Queue Leu-Leu (Koyimbi Ko!)
- 2004: Alerte Générale
- 2006: Sous-Sol
- 2008: Temps Present, Mayi Ya Sika
- 2009: Techno Malewa Vol. 1 : Sans Cesse
- 2011: Techno Malewa Suite et Fin
- 2012: Satellite
- 2014: Flèche Ingeta
- 2015: Sans Poteau
- 2017: 7 Jours De La Semaine
- 2019: Formidable

=== With Werrason ===
- 2001: Kibuisa Mpimpa (Opération Dragon)
- 2005: Témoignage

=== Partial live albums ===
- 1999: Solola Bien Live in USA
- 1999: Live au Palais des Sports
- 1999: Live à Toulouse
- 2010: Live au Zénith de Paris

=== Remix albums ===
- 2000: Terrain Eza Miné

=== Singles and maxi-singles ===
- 2003: "Tindika Lokito"
- 2004: "Alerte Générale"
- 2006: "Sous-Sol"
- 2013: "Éducation"
