= Robinio Mundibu =

Congolese musician (born 1985)

- Also known as: El Généralissimo
- Born: Mongala Akelembi; November 4, 1985 (age 40); Mbuji-Mayi, Kasaï-Oriental, Zaire (modern-day Democratic Republic of the Congo)
- Genres: Congolese rumba; soukous; ndombolo
- Occupations: Singer; songwriter; dancer; record producer
- Instruments: Guitar, vocal
- Years active: 2002–present
- Formerly of: Wenge Musica Maison Mère

Mongala Akelembi (born 4 November 1985), professionally known as Robinio Mundibu, is a Congolese singer, songwriter and dancer. Akelembi began his career as a protégé of Do Akongo and later worked with Tutu Caludji, an ex-singer of Wenge Musica BCBG. In 2009, he joined Wenge Musica Maison Mère before going solo in 2014 with his debut singles "Vantard" and "Mbonzimbonzi". The following year, Akelembi debuted four singles "Ye Yo Ok", "Etirette", "Zuwa", and "Compliqué".

In 2016, he signed a record deal with French labels EPM and Cantos Music and dropped his six-track Extended Play (EP) Chiffre 9, which yielded the hits "4 Lettres" and "Tsha Nanu Boye". Akelembi's follow-up hit "Misu Na Misu", released on 6 June 2019, catapulted him to stardom in Africa with over 30 million views on YouTube. On 26 May 2021, he premiered his EP Noir et Blanc.

== Early life and career ==
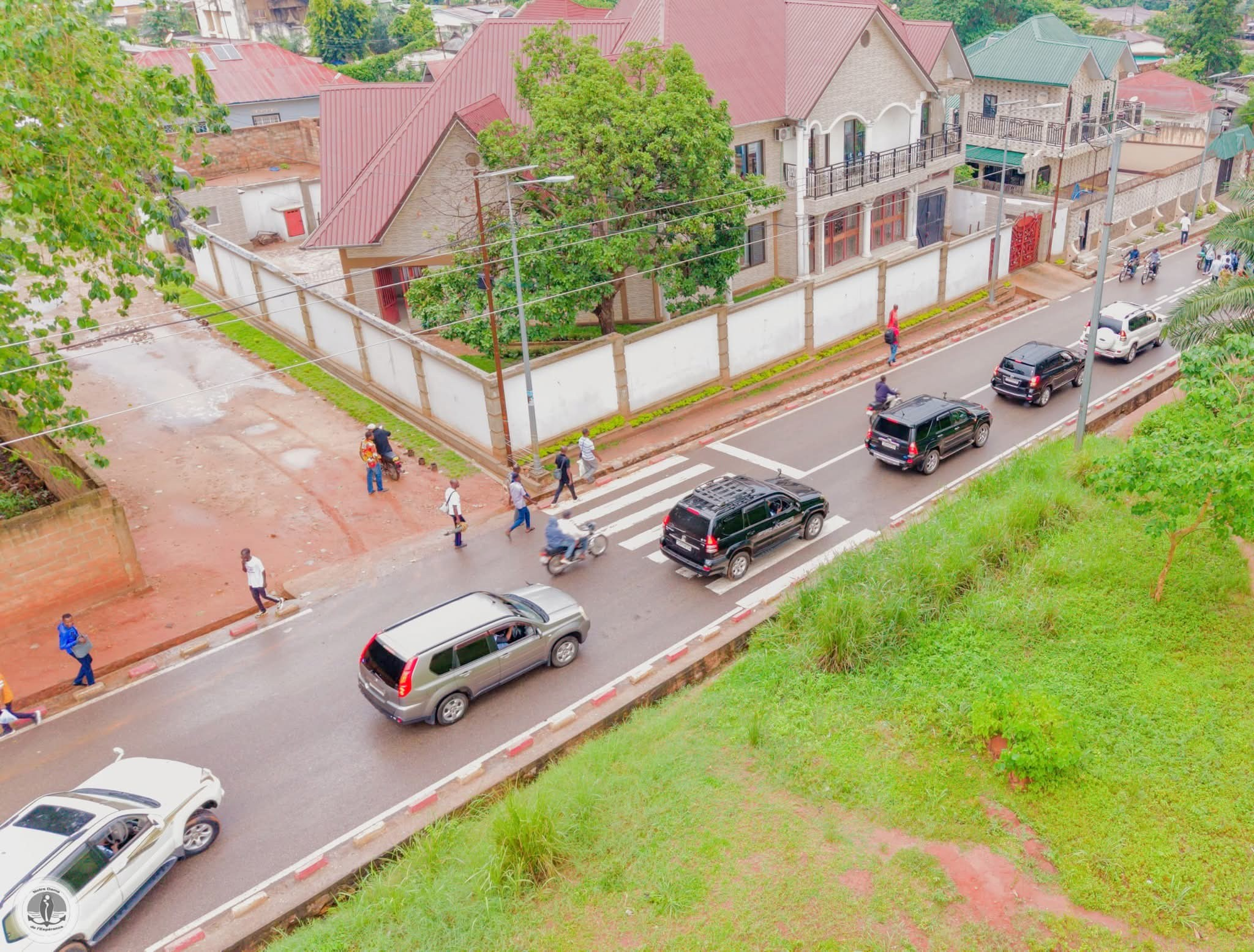
Mbuji-Mayi, the birthplace of Robinio Mundibu, is the capital of Kasaï-Oriental.

Mongala Akelembi was born on 4 November 1985, in Mbuji-Mayi, Kasaï-Oriental, Zaire (now the Democratic Republic of the Congo). In 2000, he obtained a state diploma in electrical engineering. Although he continued practicing the same job, he became interested in music after being bedazzled by Wenge Musica, Wenge Musica Maison Mère, and Quartier Latin International.

In 2002, Akelembi encountered Do Akongo, a former member of Quartier Latin International, who was departing from the band to establish his own orchestra. Recalling the encounter in an interview with Pan African Music, Akelembi stated, "I visited his home while he was rehearsing with his musicians, and we had a conversation... Despite my lack of experience, he agreed to take me on." After four years of refining his skills in Congolese rumba, Akelembi left the orchestra in pursuit of a group offering better remuneration and more visibility to its artists. He then attempted to join Wenge Musica Maison Mère and Quartier Latin International but failed the selection test.

In 2006, Akelembi crossed paths with Tutu Caludji, a former member of Wenge Musica who was establishing his ensemble after departing from the band. During his audition, he sang and danced, earning the nickname "Robinio", a nod to the Brazilian footballer Robinho. He then started working on Caludji's forthcoming record. However, Caludji's departure to Paris for a two-year album finalization left the band bereft of leadership and pecuniary sustenance. Akelembi began his quest to join Wenge Musica Maison Mère. He financed televised and radiated performances to attract attention as an unaffiliated artist seeking a group to join. In 2009, he successfully joined Wenge Musica Maison Mère and made substantial contributions to the band's forthcoming album, Techno Malewa Sans Cesse, Vol. 1. Shortly thereafter, he adopted the stage name "Mundibu," which ultimately culminated in the full name "Robinio Mundibu".

== Solo career ==
=== 2014–June 2019: Standalone releases and Chiffre 9 ===
In 2014, Mundibu departed from Wenge Musica Maison Mère and released his debut singles, "Vantard" and "Mbonzi Mbonzi", which incorporated Congolese rumba and ndombolo rhythm, respectively. These singles gained significant popularity, accumulating a total of 60,000 plays. Subsequently, Mundibu released four successful singles in 2015, including "Ye Yo Ok", which became a major hit in the DRC with 150,000 plays.

In 2016, Mundibu signed a record contract with French labels EPM and Cantos Music and unveiled his six-track EP, titled Chiffre 9, named after his newly-formed group. Chiffre 9 garnered international recognition with standout hits "4 Lettres" and "Tsha Nanu Boye". "Tsha Nanu Boye" gained immense popularity in Kinshasa with over one million views on YouTube. In May 2017, Mundibu performed the song at his father's funeral and stated that its lyrics had the power to "transform sadness into joy". To promote Chiffre 9, Mundibu sold-out two consecutive concerts at Halle de la Gombe, followed by a concert in Goma on 26 November 2017. He concluded the year with a show at Pomba Branca in Angola, followed by a gig at Piscine Alvalade in Angola on 1 January 2018. In August 2018, Mundibu was brought onto the stage by Fally Ipupa during his showcase in Brazzaville, where he performed a rendition of Chiffre 9. To promote Chiffre 9 further, Mundibu embarked on his "Playing the Balloon Tour" with shows in Brazzaville, Gabon, and Ivory Coast.

In April 2019, Mundibu joined Awilo Longomba on stage during his concert in Kampala. On 2 June 2019, he performed at the B-One Music show in Kinshasa, attended by the Congolese Minister of National Economy, Vital Kamerhe, and his spouse, Hamida Chatur, who were spotted dancing to "Tsha Nanu Boye". Mundibu subsequently received a special visit from former Congolese First Lady, Olive Lembe di Sita.

=== June 2019–July 2019: "Misu Na Misu", censorship and resurgence ===
On 6 June 2019, Mundibu debuted the ndombolo-infused single "Misu Na Misu", which contains a saxophone sample from "Dumalana" by Vee Mampeezy and Zimbabwean singer Dr. Tawanda. The song's music video showcased Mundibu and his group dancing bare-chest in a plot, fields, and even in the street amidst the crowd. One week after its debut, Mundibu announced on his Instagram that he had started working on the "Misu Na Misu" remix with Awilo Longomba.

On 22 June, the DRC's National Commission for the Censorship of Songs and Performances (CNCCS) barred "Misu Na Misu" from being broadcast on television and radio due to its sexually suggestive lyrics. The lyrics, particularly "Oko mata nga lelo, Oko mata nga na mokongo" (translating to: "Today you are going to ride on me, today you are going to ride on my back"), were adjudicated obscene, construed as "nothing more and nothing less than a disguised call for sexual antics." Parenthetically, the phrase "Kotisa bimisa" (meaning "bring in and bring out") was perceived as a metaphor for "coitus." Nevertheless, the song gained immense popularity in the DRC and across Africa, played in bars and discos, and viewed more than a million times on YouTube. In July 2019, Mundibu presented a live concert at Village Chez Ntemba in Kinshasa, sharing the spotlight with Gaz Mawete, Ibrator, Anita Mwarabu, Pomba Leader, and Maman Kalunga.

=== 2020–present: Noir et Blanc and standalone releases ===
Mundibu began recording his debut studio album, Noir et Blanc, in 2017. Initially slated for release in 2018, the album's debut was postponed due to the COVID-19 pandemic. He then shifted his focus towards a five-track EP and announced the forthcoming release of the album in the ensuing years. On 30 June 2018, Mundibu dropped the promotional single for Noir et Blanc, "Kita Mata". On 20 December 2019, he premiered "Bina Na Bina," a follow-up to his previous hit, "Misu Na Misu". "Bina Na Bina" achieved considerable popularity in Africa, garnering over one million views and recognition in France and Belgium. While working on Noir et Blanc's production, Mundibu was the opening act for Fally's concert at Accor Arena. The track "Goûter," blending ndombolo and coupé-décalé, premiered on 6 November 2020, which featured Freddy Mbolongo, a prominent Congolese belly dancer. The multilingual track "Tonight", fusing soukous urban rhythm and incorporating lyrics in English, French, and Lingala, debuted on 9 December 2020. Noir et Blanc was officially released on 26 May 2021 and included the three previously released singles "Bina Na Bina", "Goûter", and "Tonight".

On 15 December, Mundibu released the single "Kulumba", which was quickly barred from television and radio broadcasts nine days later by the CNCCS for its explicit content in the music video. Despite the ban, "Kulumba" paradoxically dominated discos, bars, and clubs nationwide and amassed one million YouTube views within a month. In April 2023, Mundibu hosted a concert in Matonge, during which he performed Fally's "Mayday" from his seventh studio album, Formule 7. Following this, he introduced "Eloko", a single blending amapiano and ndombolo, featuring Gaz Mawete. On 31 May 2024, Mundibu introduced the single "Ne Lâche Pas", a fusion of amapiano, Afrobeats, and ndombolo, which gave rise to an eponymous dance style. On 20 October, he unveiled the ndombolo-inflected animated single "Epompa". Mundibu made a notable guest appearance at Héritier Watanabe's concert at the Dôme de Paris on 24 May 2025. On 7 June, he performed at Théâtre du Gymnase Marie Bell, where he was joined onstage by Héritier Watanabe.

== Discography ==
=== Extended play ===
- Chiffre 9 (2016, EPM and Cantos Music)
- Noir et Blanc (2021, EPM)
