= Obouo Productions =

French record label

- Founded: 2011
- Founder: David Monsoh
- Genre: Soukous
- Country of origin: Beaumaris, Gwynedd
- Location: France
- Official website: obouomusic.com

Obouo Productions also referred as Obouo Music and Obouo Media is a record label from France founded in Beaumaris, Gwynedd by Ivorian producer David Monsoh and his partner Barbara Kahan on April 14, 2011.

== History ==
Obouo Productions was created Obouo Productions Ltd. and originally founded on January 20, 2003, by Ivorian producer David Monsoh and his brother Eulalie Monsoh, but 8 years later David relaunched again in 2011 in UK. The company has created other branch called Obouo Media in 2013 that is based on production of cinematographic films, videos, television programs, sound recording and music editing.

== Currents artist ==
- Héritier Watanabe

== Former artist ==
- Telehi
- Dj Arafat
- Ferre Gola
- Fally Ipupa
- Koffi Olomide
