= Fabregas (singer) =

Congolese singer (born 1987)

Fabregas le Métis Noir
- Born: 13 June 1987 (age 39); Kinshasa, Zaire (modern-day Democratic Republic of the Congo)
- Genre: Dance
- Occupation: Singer-songwriter
- Years active: 2006–present
- Labels: Because Music; Wanted Records
- Formerly of: Wenge Musica Maison Mère

Fabrice Mbuyulu (born 13 June 1987), known by the stage name Fabregas Le Métis Noir, is a Congolese singer-songwriter, dancer, and music producer. He began his musical career by singing in a Catholic church choir. Between 2008 and 2011, he was a member of the Wenge Musica Maison Mère orchestra. In 2015, he founded his own record label, Wanted Records.

== Discography ==
=== Studio albums ===
- 2012: Amour Amour
- 2013: Amour Amour (Edition Collector)
- 2014: Anapipo (Mixtape)
- 2016: Je Pense <<Poison & Antidote>>
- 2019: Cible: Mise à jour
- 2023: Gomme
- 2024: Les Inseparables (Duo album with Deplick Pomba)

=== With VillaNova ===
- 2017: Cursus
- 2025: University

=== With Wenge Musica Maison Mère ===
- 2008 : Temps Présent "Mayi ya sika"
- 2009 : Techno Malewa Sans Cesse vol. 1
- 2011 : Diata Bawu (Maxi-Single)
- 2011 : Techno Malewa Sans Cesse suite & fin

=== Singles ===
- 2014: Mascara (Ya Mado)
- 2015: Tengana
- 2017: Ozana (Bénissez vos jaloux)
- 2018: Pinçage
- 2018: Roulage
- 2018: Bis Encore
- 2019: Épave
- 2020: Yomoko Pona (Ft. Innos’B)
- 2021: Brenda
- 2022: Moellon
- 2022: Pays de merveilles
- 2022: Nyongo
- 2023: Robot Nzele
- 2024: Embombo
- 2025: Je m’en fous
- 2025: Ange Perso(The Big Bollard)

== See also ==
- Werrason
- Fally Ipupa
- Ferre Gola
