= Wenge Musica =

Congolese soukous band

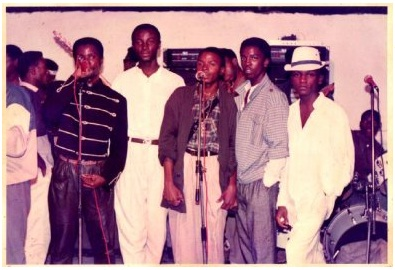
- Wenge Musica in 1985

Background information
- Origin: Kinshasa, Democratic Republic of the Congo
- Genres: Soukous; ndombolo; Congolese rumba
- Years active: 1981–1997
- Labels: Bisel; Sans Frontières; W.I.B.E; SonoDisc; SIPE Simon Music
- Spinoffs: Wenge Musica Aile Paris; Wenge BCBG; Wenge Musica Maison Mère

Wenge Musica (also known as Wenge Musica BCBG or Wenge Musica BCBG 4×4) was a Congolese soukous band founded in 1981 by Didier Masela and later led by JB Mpiana, from 1986 until its dissolution, in December 1997. Regarded as the forerunner of the fourth generation of Congolese popular dance music, particularly through their role in popularizing ndombolo, the band emerged in a fashion similar to Zaïko Langa Langa a decade earlier, operating as a collective of co-founders rather than revolving around a single bandleader. Like Zaïko Langa Langa and earlier TPOK Jazz, the band achieved success without relying on established musical sponsors.

Wenge Musica released their debut album, Bouger!! Bouger!! Makinzu!!!, on the Bisel label in 1988, which introduced their first smash hit, "Mulolo", composed by JB Mpiana. In 1991, they released their second album, Kin É Bougé, through the Mabisa label, followed by Les Pleins Feux, recorded in 1992 but not released until 1996. In 1993, Wenge Musica recorded Kala-Yi-Boeing in Brussels and releasing their fifth album and first double album, Les Anges Adorables, the following year. By the mid-1990s, Wenge Musica had become a defining musical influence, inspiring numerous bands, including the Brazzaville-based Extra Musica, founded in 1993, which quickly emerged as a significant rival. Initially criticized as imitators, Extra Musica soon distinguished themselves with a dynamic style. Wenge Musica's sixth and final album, Pentagone, was released in April 1996.

Interpersonal disputes intensified following Mpiana's solo debut, Feux de l'amour (1997), which deepened his rivalry with fellow co-founder Werrason. During a December 1997 performance at the InterContinental Hotel (now Pullman Kinshasa Grand Hôtel), divisions within the band became apparent to the public and fueled widespread speculation of an imminent breakup. Amid growing unrest among the fandom and mounting political sensitivities, particularly as the AFDL insurgency led by Laurent-Désiré Kabila gained ground in eastern Zaire, the government intervened, when the Minister of Information and Cultural Affairs convened a meeting between JB Mpiana and Werrason to ease tensions and preserve unity among Kinshasa's youth. The mediation failed, and shortly thereafter, Wenge Musica split into two rival groups, with Wenge BCBG, led by JB Mpiana, and Wenge Musica Maison Mère, led by Werrason. By the end of the 1990s, their rivalry had come to dominate the Congolese and broader African popular music scene.

== History ==
=== 1979–1986: Early years, first performances, and lineup changes ===
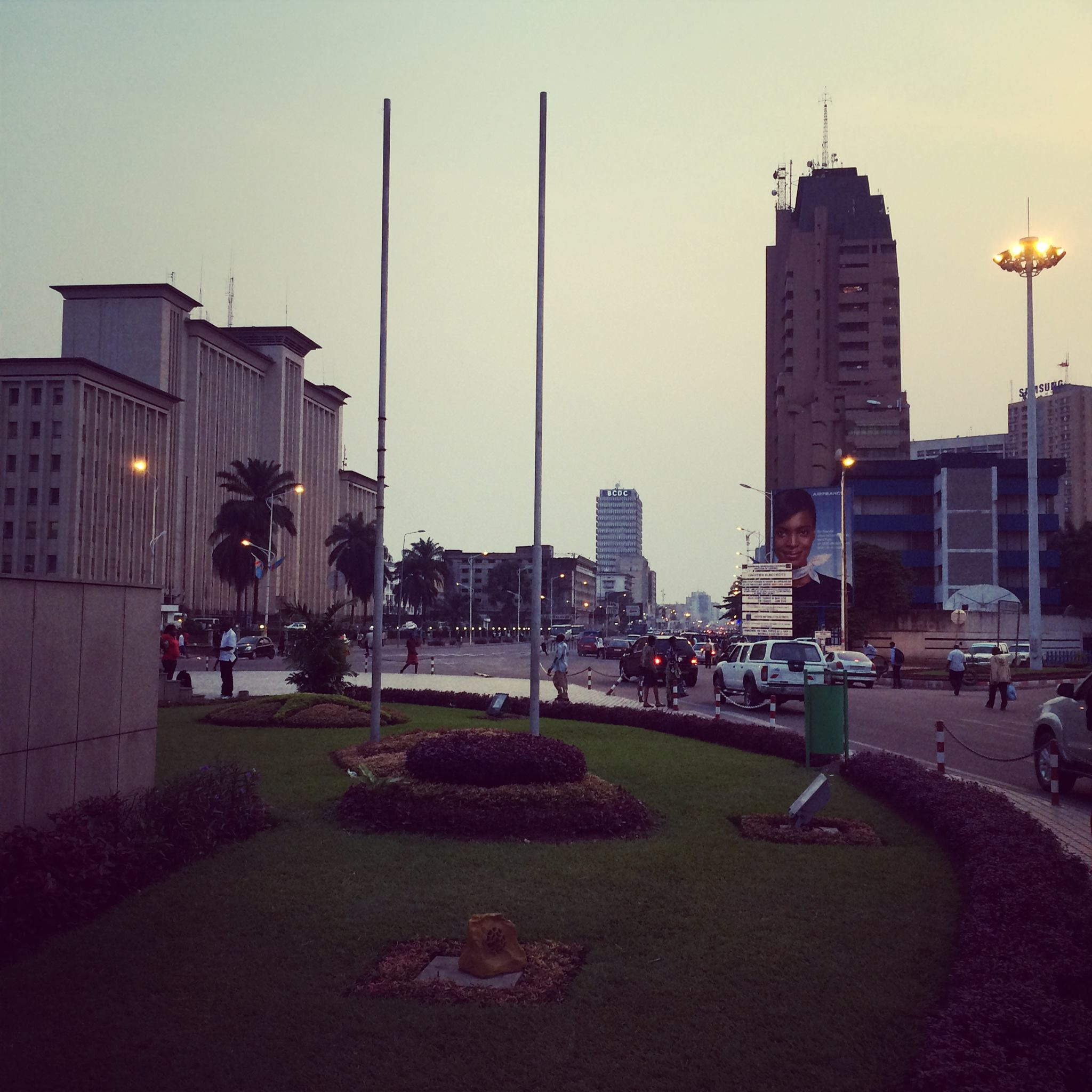
Kinshasa, historically known as Léopoldville, where Wenge Musica first took shape.

In 1979, a number of school friends that included Aimé Buanga (guitar), Werrason (vocals), Didier Masela (guitar), Machiro Kifaya (vocals), Papy Sanji (vocals), and Kija Brown formed a group called Celio Stars in Bandalungwa, Kinshasa. In 1981, they renamed themselves Wenge Musica. Their lineup initially remained the same, but they were later joined by Dede Masolo, Wes Koka, and Anicet Pandu on vocals; Alain "Docteur Zing" Mwanga, Alain Makaba, and Christian Zitu on guitars; and Ladins Montana, Maradona, and Evo Nsiona on drums. In late 1982, singer JB Mpiana joined the band and brought another vocalist, Blaise Bula, along with him.

Following their early performances at the Moto Na Moto and Olympia bars around 1984 and an unreleased 1986 recording session at Verckys Kiamuangana Mateta's Studio Vévé, which featured "Kin É Bougé", "Bébé", "Laura", "Sylvie", and "Césarine", Wenge Musica experienced several lineup changes, with the departure of Pandu, Koka, Zitu, Masolo, Buanga, and Mwanga. The band stabilized at the end of the year around core members Mpiana, Werrason, Bula, Makaba, Masela, Maradona, and Nsiona, as well as new members Adolphe Dominguez (vocals), Ricoco Bulambemba (vocals), Alain Mpela (vocals), Djolina (guitar), Blaise Kombo (guitar), and their first atalaku, Full King. Around the same period, Aimé Buanga and Alain Mwanga relocated to Paris for studies, where they laid the groundwork for what would later become Wenge Musica Aile Paris.

=== 1987–1989: Bouger!! Bouger!! Makinzu!!! ===
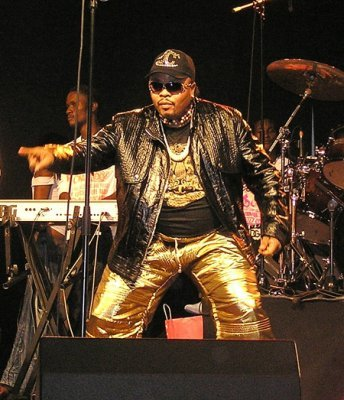
JB Mpiana (pictured here in 2008), composed Wenge Musica's first smash hit, "Mulolo".

The band's debut studio album, Bouger!! Bouger!! Makinzu!!!, recorded in 1987, was released on the Bisel label in 1988. It was reissued in 1994 on the English label Natari, with two additional tracks. Bouger!! Bouger!! Makinzu!!! yielded the band's first smash hit, "Mulolo", which was written by Mpiana, and also featured "Amoi Nicky D" by Werrason, "La Fille de Roi" and "Bakolo Budget" by Mpiana, "Dodo La Rose" by Didier Masela, and "Fisol" by Alain Makaba. After its release, music critics in Kinshasa accentuated the band's distinctive sound, which was influenced by the rhythmic style of King Kester Emeneya. Werrason's baritone voice was likened to that of Victoria Eleison's frontman, while the album's electronic arrangements resembled those on Emeneya's Nzinzi (1987). The band subsequently became emblematic of a new generation promoting upper-class, stylish fashion trends and the La Sape sartorial subculture.

Following the success of Bouger!! Bouger!! Makinzu!!!, Wenge Musica embarked on their first European tour, which was arranged by producers Kibonge and Kokar, with scheduled appearances in Paris and Brussels in 1989. However, the tour was marred by visa and customs issues, as while Ricoco Bulambemba and drummer Pipo La Musica managed to enter Europe using falsified travel documents, principal members such as Didier Masela, Werrason, Mpiana, and Alain Makaba were unable to leave Kinshasa. In Paris, Ricoco joined forces with Alain Mwanga (also known as "Zing Zong") and Aimé Buanga, who were residing there, to rehearse and perform, and shortly thereafter recruited additional musicians, including Ya Yuyu, JDT Mulopwe, Boss Matuta, and Prince César Loboko. Adolphe Dominguez, also in Europe, participated in these early rehearsals, awaiting the arrival of the rest of the band.

Still in 1989, Wenge Musica appeared in the "Zaire" episode of the BBC documentary series Under African Skies, about African music.

=== 1990–1993: Kin É Bougé, Pleins Feux, and Kala-Yi-Boeing ===
A sample of the band's 1991 song "Kin É Bougé"

In December 1990, a second European tour brought Mpiana, Werrason, Masela, Makaba, Blaise Bula, Roberto Wunda Ekokota, Marie-Paul Kambulu, Collégien Zola, and drummer Titina Al Capone to Brussels, where they recorded Kin É Bougé and performed several concerts. For this tour, Adolphe Dominguez reinforced the lineup, while Ricoco was sidelined from performing with the returning Kinshasa faction. The album was released in 1991 through the Mabisa label. The record contained five tracks: "Ngoma Maguy" (Ekokota), "Kin É Bougé" (Mpiana), "Princesse" (Alain Makaba, performed by Mpiana), "Kaskin" (Werrason), and "Eve Sukali" (Blaise Bula). It achieved greater commercial success than Bouger!! Bouger!! Makinzu!!!, eclipsing even the popularity of "Mulolo". The lead vocal sections were performed by singers Mpiana, Werrason, Blaise Bula, Adolphe Dominguez, and Marie-Paul, while the instrumentation featured Makaba's guitars, Masela's bass, Titina's drumming, synthesizers by Cyril Orcel and Makaba, and atalaku contributions from Ekokota and Full King. "Ngoma Maguy" marked Ekokota's first major contribution as atalaku and is regarded as an early example of a proto–opening theme in ndombolo albums that emphasizes sebene and animation over sung rumba sections, a format popularized earlier by Pépé Kallé and Zaïko Langa Langa, notably on Nippon Banzai. With improved sound quality, a faster, staccato tempo, and the introduction of an acoustic snare drum, Kin É Bougé gained success on both sides of the Congo River, across Africa, and among the African diaspora, and solidified the group as Zaire's leading band in 1991, as well as earning Mpiana the accolade of best singer. After their return to Zaire, Marie-Paul, despite his notable backing vocals on Kin É Bougé, left the band and rejoined the Paris-based musicians, which intensified tensions between the two camps. Marie-Paul's departure marked the formal consolidation of Wenge Musica Aile Paris under the management of Francis Kalombo. The Paris wing expanded its membership to include Kojak, Rento Vena, Savanet Depitshou, José Kike, 3615 Code Niawu, and Kennedy Mbala. Established Zairian artists, including King Kester Emeneya and Lidjo Kwempa, supported the new formation and contributed compositions and visibility. Joly Mubiala and former Victoria Eleison drummer Djudju Ché also took part in early recordings. Among the first songs prepared for release was "Molangi ya Malasi", composed by Ricoco during his tenure with the orchestra Il Fallait Kaka. The split ultimately crystallized a sustained rivalry between the Kinshasa-based Wenge Musica and its Paris offshoot.

Wenge Musica recorded their second studio album, Pleins Feux, in 1992, but it ultimately fell short of the success of their previous album. The sessions reunited the band with Alain Makaba and included recordings of several of their late-1980s hits—"Djino" (Werrason), "Dady Bitody" (Djolina Mandudila), and a revised version of "Fisol" (Alain Makaba)—along with the previously unreleased tracks "Jugement par défaut" (Werrason), "Avé Maria" (Blaise Bula), "Nazareth" (Mpiana), and an eponymous song by Ekokota. Pleins Feux emphasized the distinctive style of Makaba, with strong use of electronic instrumentation, including synthesizers handled by new keyboardist Désiré Kalala, and electronic drums. The album also introduced the young Manda Chante through compositions by Mpiana and Werrason, giving him prominent vocal opportunities. The record was never completed nor released officially, until a bootlegged version by SaGa Production appeared in 1996. The band's Brussels concert at La Madeleine from the same tour is regarded as one of their most outstanding live performances.

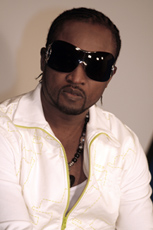
The 1993 hit "Kala-Yi-Boeing" was written by Werrason (pictured here in 2007).

Wenge Musica's 1993 fourth studio album, Kala-Yi-Boeing, spawned the hits "Kala-Yi-Boeing" (Werrason), "C'est Trop Tard Djenga" (Alain Makaba), "Cresois" (Didier Masela), "Mon Ami Coboss" (Mpiana), "Danico" (JB Mpiana), "Jessy Chouchou de London" (Blaise Bule), and "Voyage Mboso" (Adolphe Dominguez). The album title, Kala-Yi-Boeing, derives from Werrason's eponymous composition, sung in his native Kimbala language. The record also popularized the "Boma Liwanza!" dance. Although he contributed vocals to the title track, Manda Chante soon left to join Wenge El Paris (a spin-off of Wenge Musica Aile Paris, led by Marie-Paul), reportedly amid strained relations with Mpiana and dissatisfaction with the band's response to his illness. That year, the band performed in Paris alongside Zaïko Langa Langa and collaborated with Kassav' for the first time. During this period, the lineup expanded to include Aimelia Lias on vocals, Tutu Callugi as atalaku, and Burkina Faso as soloist.

=== 1994–April 1997: Les Anges Adorables, heyday, and Pentagone ===
In 1994, Wenge Musica issued their fifth album and first double album, Les Anges Adorables, through SonoDisc in Paris. The release enjoyed major commercial success across Africa and among Afro-French audiences. Divided into two volumes of six tracks each, the album featured instrumental contributions from Alain Makaba (lead guitar), Ficarré Mwamba (lead), Patient Kusangila (rhythm and lead guitar), Christian Mwepu and Didier Masela (bass), Titi Alcapone (drums), and Ali Mbonda (percussion). That same year, Wenge Musica faced turmoil when Blaise Bula was assaulted by a soldier of the Forces Armées Zaïroises, who was also the new husband of his former partner, Monique Kalala. The assault left him hospitalized and missing several teeth, which forced him to miss a scheduled performance at the Pullman Kinshasa Grand Hôtel. During that concert, Mpiana and Alain Mpela condemned the attack in the song "La Tempête du Désert", dedicated to Kongulu Mobutu, son of Mobutu Sese Seko. The year also saw the emergence of a new talent, Ferré Gola, who joined Wenge Musica after performing with the Kinshasa-based Rumba des Jeunes.

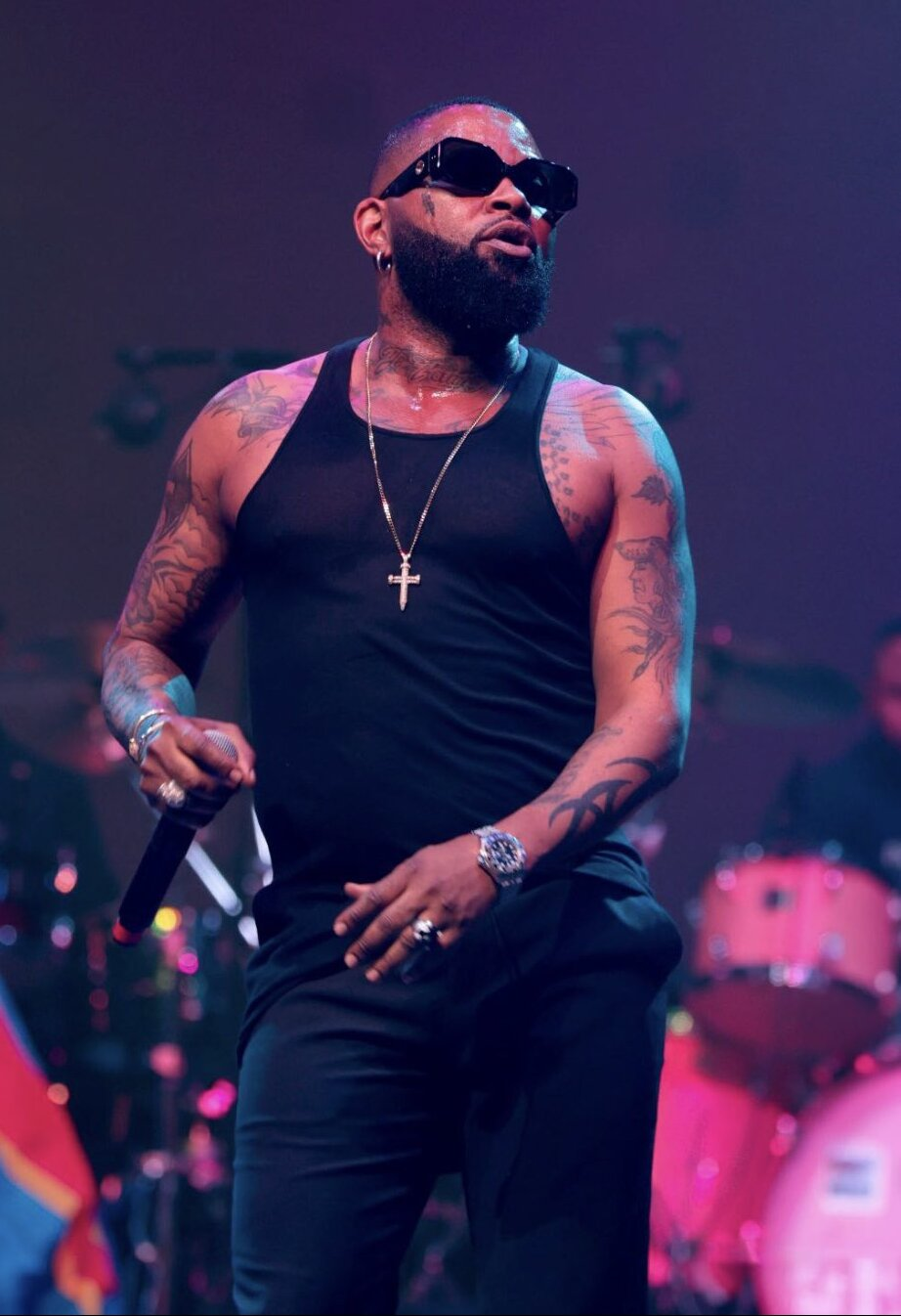
1994 marked the rise of Ferré Gola (pictured here in 2024), who joined the band and would later establish himself as a significant Congolese rumba singer-songwriter.

By the mid-1990s, Wenge Musica had reached the pinnacle of their musical influence, setting trends for a whole generation and being a dominant force in the Zairian music industry. The group's popularity was evident in the surge of bands modeled after it, most notably Extra Musica from Brazzaville, founded in 1993, which in less than three years became a major rival. Initially dismissed as an imitator, the band's musicians were seen as mere copies of Wenge Musica. However, the animated and distinctive style of Extra Musica, driven by atalaku Kila Mbongo, quickly distinguished them and pushed Wenge Musica to elevate its creativity. Meanwhile, Koffi Olomidé emerged as another challenging rival by integrating popular elements from Les Anges Adorables into his tchatcho style and revamping his lineup by recruiting nearly all of Sam Tshintu's Flash Musica band, including Willy Bula (Blaise's brother) and Geco Bouro Mpela (Alain's brother). During this intense competition, Koffi also brought in the atalaku Beevans Rappason, whose vocal tone was identical to Ekokota. The rivalry deepened as both camps exchanged slogans, which ultimately led Wenge Musica to embark on an American tour in response to Koffi's album Magie, recorded with Quartier Latin International and promoted by music videos filmed in New York City. Their success paved way for their first U.S. performances, notably in Boston in 1995, which was facilitated by Papy Kimbi, who had been living abroad since the early 1990s.

Wenge Musica released their sixth and final studio album, Pentagone, in April 1996, through Simon Music S.I.P.E. It featured 11 tracks, and during their European tour, the band, now nicknamed the "Anges Adorables", performed all of them live. Out of the tracks, Werrason contributed two, "Coco Madimba" and "Héritier Itelé"; Didier Masela also wrote two, "Daddet Autant" and "Etepe-Buengo"; while Mpiana wrote a single track, "No Comment Shengen", which revisited the chorus from the original "Kin É Bougé". The record became a massive hit across Africa and its diaspora, with dances such as Situtala and Likofi ya Ngombe. Much like Kin É Bougé, Pentagone opens with a theme song that prominently features the dance section, giving the atalakus room to shine, a practice Wenge Musica popularized, even if they did not invent the format. Partly thanks to the band's military-style outfits during the album's promotion, Pentagone became sought after among young fans. During the album's presentation, Ferré Gola began his role as an atalaku, filling in for Tutu Caludji. Critics noted that Pentagone played a central role in developing and popularizing ndombolo. The defining vocal element, the cry of "ndombolo", was largely created by Caludji, while the accompanying dance choreography was a collective effort, as visual forms of the dance appeared in Pentagone's music videos, with the Dimba-Boma dancers shaping its signature moves. Werrason and Mpiana introduced stylistic elements like twirls and expressive hand gestures, which were further refined by Souzi Versace and Bouro Mpela during a May 1995 rehearsal at La Samba Playa in Kinshasa.

=== December 1997: Breakup ===
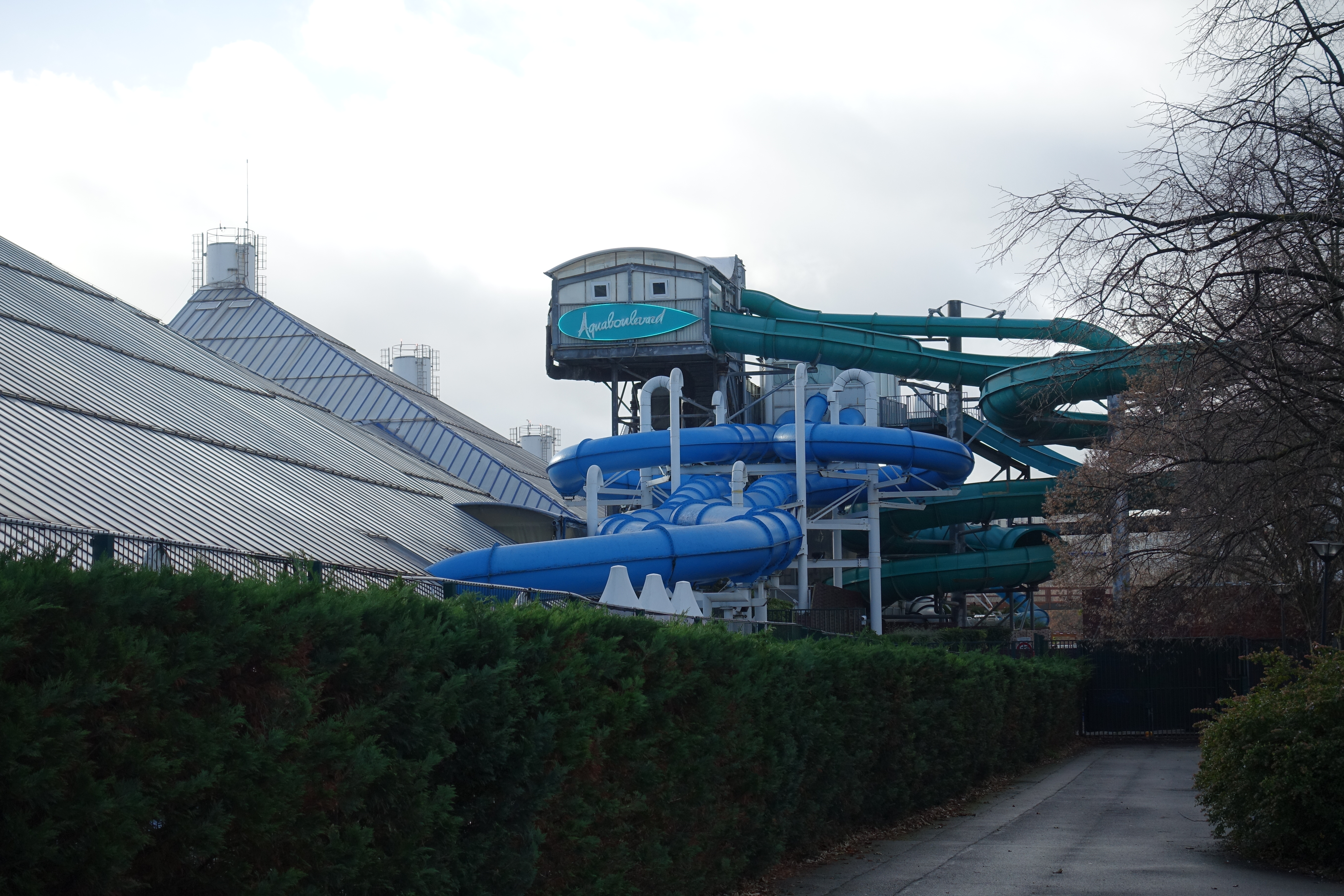
Wenge Musica performed at Aquaboulevard in Paris (pictured here) during their 1996–97 European tour.

According to Bob W. White, a social anthropologist at the University of Montreal, the band's split followed the release of Mpiana's debut solo album, Feux de l'amour (1997), which intensified his rivalry with fellow co-founder Werrason. The four co-founding members, Alain Makaba, Mpiana, Werrason, and Didier Masela, had previously agreed that each would eventually produce a solo album. Mpiana's record was completed during the band's 1996–97 European tour, during which the group performed at Aquaboulevard in Paris while wearing jerseys celebrating Paris Saint‑Germain F.C.'s run to the final of the 1996–97 UEFA Cup Winners' Cup.

The album's commercial success led to multiple promotional offers for Mpiana, including a five-year contract with Cameroonian producer Simon Njonang of Simon Music S.I.P.E., who had also produced Pentagone. As a result, upcoming performances and international tours were expected to promote Mpiana's album, meaning the main financial benefits would go primarily to him. Alain Makaba supported the proposal and attempted to impose it on the band, but Werrason and Didier Masela rejected the arrangement. This disagreement split Wenge Musica into two camps, with Mpiana, Alain Makaba, and Blaise Bula forming the faction nicknamed "Bana Mindele" ("the Westerners"), partly because of their hip-hop-inspired clothing style. Opposing them were Werrason and Didier Masela, whose supporters, known for wearing Japanese designer outfits, earned the nickname "Ba Japonais". Mpiana's allies, with Simon's backing, reportedly aimed to push Werrason out of the band. Throughout the 1997 tour, internal tensions became increasingly visible. Although Mpiana gave interviews attempting to reassure the public, the situation remained unstable. Some of the final concerts, particularly those in Abidjan, were performed without Mpiana and Blaise Bula but included the young Ferré Gola, while other shows took place without Werrason, Adolphe Dominguez, or Didier Masela.

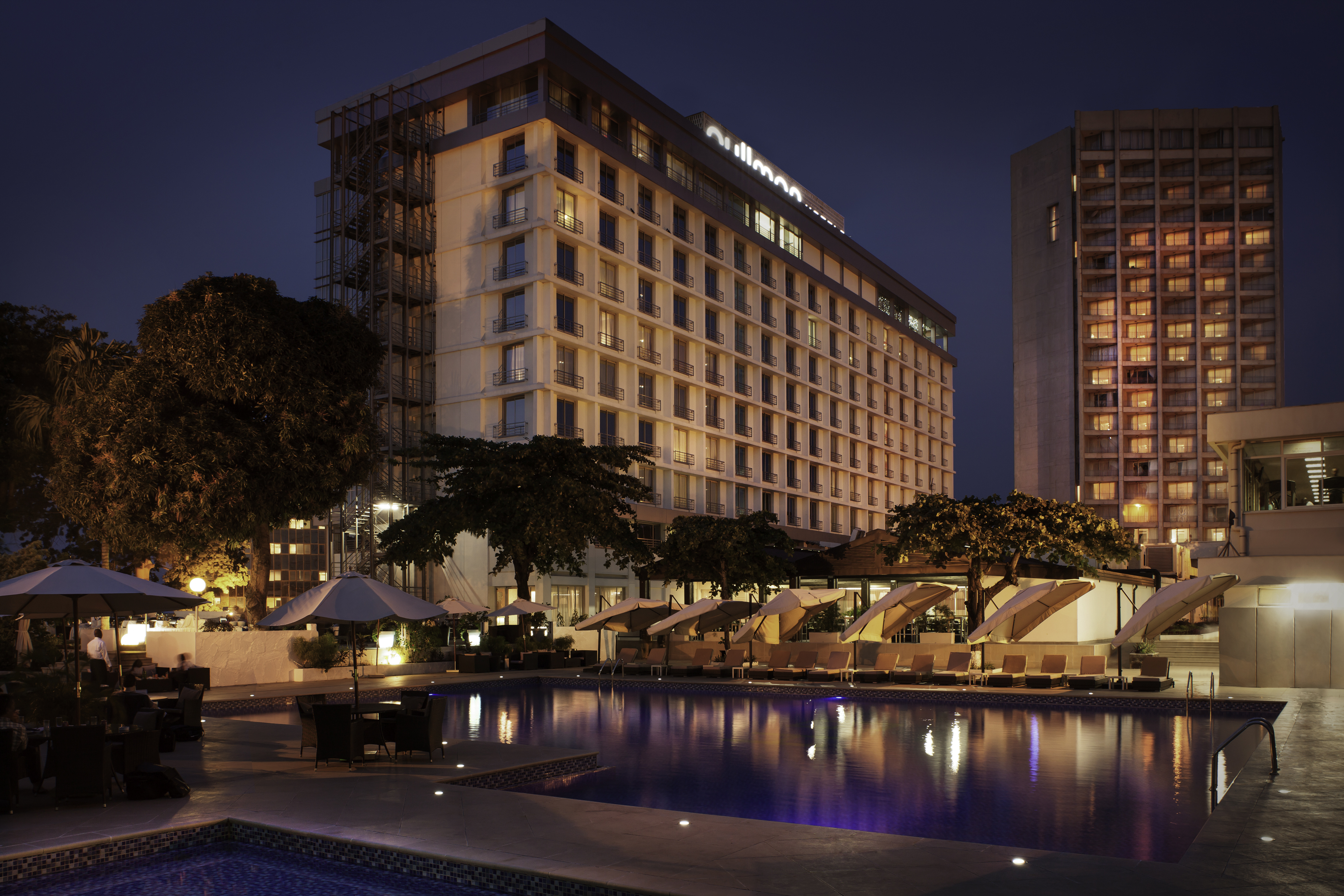
Pullman Kinshasa Grand Hôtel, where Wenge Musica members publicly confronted each other during the presentation concert of Feux de l'amour on 7 December 1997, shortly before the band split.

The conflict became public during the presentation concert of Feux de l'amour on 7 December at the Pullman Kinshasa Grand Hôtel. During the performance, Blaise Bula openly mocked Werrason, sarcastically suggesting he dreamed of becoming one of his colleagues. Werrason responded by claiming he had never wished harm upon his bandmates and insisting that the group ultimately belonged to its founder, Didier Masela. The heated confrontation occurred before a stunned audience and in the presence of Papa Wemba, who himself became a controversial figure in the dispute, with some accusing him of encouraging the split, an allegation he denied. Nevertheless, his influence was notable because he had strongly supported Mpiana's independence and stated that the band could only have one bandleader. The division echoed earlier conflicts in Congolese music, including the 1988 internal split of Zaïko Langa Langa and the 1982 dispute between Papa Wemba and King Kester Emeneya within Viva La Musica, artists who had been childhood idols of Mpiana and Werrason, respectively.

In the wake of fan demonstrations calling for unity, government authorities expressed concern that the dispute could become destabilizing, particularly amid the advancing AFDL rebellion led by Laurent-Désiré Kabila in eastern Zaire. Mediation efforts were attempted by influential musicians such as Tabu Ley Rochereau, and the Minister of Information and Cultural Affairs convened a meeting between Mpiana and Werrason to resolve their differences and promote social cohesion by urging the musicians not to lose focus "at a time when there is a need for unity in the name of national reconstruction". The mediation failed, and soon afterward, Werrason allegedly confronted Mpiana at the Grand Hôtel on the night of the album presentation, accusing him of betrayal. Soldiers from the Forces Armées Congolaises intervened to separate them. The band was ultimately split into two groups, with Wenge Musica BCBG, led by Mpiana, and Wenge Musica Maison Mère, led by Werrason. By the end of the 1990s, the rivalry between the two artists had become a dominant feature of the Congolese and broader African popular music scenes.

== Post-breakup ==
=== 2000s: Spin-off bands and rivalries ===
During the 2000s, numerous groups carrying the Wenge name emerged, eventually numbering around ten. Many former prominent members had established their own bands, including Wenge El-Paris, led by Marie-Paul, Wenge Kumbela by Aimé Buanga, Wenge Référence by Manda Chante, Wenge Musica BCBG by JB Mpiana, Wenge Musica Maison Mère by Werrason, Pondération 8 by Blaise Bula, Wenge Musica 5/5 by Didier Masela, Wenge Tonya Tonya by Adolphe Dominguez, and Génération A by Alain Mpela.

In 2004, several members left Wenge Musica Maison Mère, among them JDT Mulopwe, Ferré Gola, Bill Clinton Kalonji, Japonais Maladi, Mimiche Bass, and Serge Mabiala, and created the band Les Marquis de Maison Mère. Meanwhile, Aimélia, who had left Wenge Musica BCBG and released a solo album in 2000, briefly joined Werrason before resuming an independent career by 2007. Tutu Caludji, who was an atalaku from Wenge Musica BCBG, also pursued a solo career and released his debut album, Paris Match, in 2010. Although their levels of success varied, most of these artists continued leading their own musical projects. At the same time, Mpiana and Werrason faced growing competition from a new, fourth generation of Congolese musicians, particularly their former protégés Ferré Gola and Fally Ipupa.

In late 2010, a private event sponsored by Airtel reunited several former members of Wenge Musica for the first time in thirteen years. Werrason, Blaise Bula, Alain Makaba, Adolphe Dominguez, Alain Mpelasi, Aimelia, Didier Masela, and drummer Titina Mbwinga appeared onstage alongside local musicians. However, Mpiana did not participate, as he was traveling to Paris to finalize his album Soyons Sérieux. Other former members, including Tutu Caludji, Marie-Paul, Burkina Faso Mboka Liya, and Manda Chante, were also absent.

=== 2022 Wenge Musica reunion ===
Stade des Martyrs in Kinshasa, where Wenge Musica performed their historic reunion concert in 2022.

The band's full reconciliation took place on 28 February 2022, when Wenge Musica officially reunited through the initiative of Guinean music executive Amadou Diaby of Mansa Music. Diaby subsequently announced the reunion concert "Ya Biso Wengeeee", which was held at Stade des Martyrs in Kinshasa on 30 June 2022, during the 62nd anniversary of the Democratic Republic of the Congo's independence, in partnership with Africell DRC CEO Milad Khairallah. The sold-out concert included more than 15 Wenge Musica musicians, including Werrason, Mpiana, Didier Masela, Blaise Bula, Alain Mpela, Alain Makaba, Adolphe Dominguez, Patient Kusangila, and Tutu Caludji. After the concert, the government allocated 1,165,677,759 FC (approximately $582,000) to support the reconciliation production tied to the national celebrations. A portion of the concert proceeds was also directed to the FARDC, due to renewed insecurity in eastern Congo linked to the M23 campaign. Werrason expressed support for FARDC on his Facebook page, and the reunited musicians later presented a VIP concert on 9 July 2022 at the Pullman Kinshasa Grand Hôtel.

== Band members ==
- Werrason – vocals (1981–1997)
- Dede Masolo – vocals (1981–1986)
- Anibo Panzu – vocals (1981–1986)
- Bienvenu Wes Koka – vocals (1981–1985)
- Machiro Kifaya – vocals (1981–1984)
- Alain Makaba – guitar, bass, synthesizer (1981–1997)
- Alain "Zing-Zong" Mwanga – guitar (1981–1986)
- Aimé Buanga – bass (1981–1986)
- Didier Masela – bass (1981–1997)
- Christian Zitu – guitar (1981–1985)
- Ladins Montana – drums (1981–1982)
- Maradona Lontomba – drums (1981–1990)
- Evo Nsiona – congas (1981–1988)
- JB Mpiana – vocals (1982–1997)
- Blaise Bula – vocals (1984–1997)
- Djolina Mandudila – guitar (1984–1993)
- Aridjana – guitar (1984–1990)
- Adolphe Dominguez – vocals (1985–1997)
- Ricoco Bulambemba – vocals (1986–1991)
- Alain Mpela – vocals (1986–1997)
- Full King – atalaku (1986–1993)
- Eddy Kandimbo – guitar (1986–1989)
- Blaise Kombo – guitar (1986–1990, died 1990)
- Marie-Paul Kambulu – vocals (1987–1993)
- Pipo La Musica – drums (1987–1989)
- Alain Mwepu – guitar (1988–1993)
- Delo Vundu – bass (1988–1991)
- Roberto Ekokota – atalaku (1988–1997)
- Kennedy Mbala – atalaku (1988–1989)
- Collégien Zola – guitar (1988–1991)
- Don Pierrot Mbonda – congas (1988–1993)
- Manda Chante – vocals (1989–1993)
- Patient Kusangila – guitar (1989–1997)
- Titina Alcapone – drums (1989–1997)
- Christian Mabanga – bass (1990–1997)
- Ficarré Mwamba – guitar (1990–1997)
- Désiré Kalala – synthesizer (1991–1993)
- Aimelia Lias – vocals (1993–1997)
- Tutu Callugi – atalaku (1993–1997)
- Burkina Faso Mboka Liya – guitar (1993–1997)
- Ali Mbonda – drums (1993–1997)
- Christian Nzenze – synthesizer (1993–1996)
- Ferré Gola – vocals (1995–1997)
- Fiston Zamuangana – guitar (1995–1997)
- Théo Bidens – synthesizer (1995–1997)
- Seguin Mignon – drums (1995–1997)
- Japonais Maladi – guitar (1995–1997)
- Michael Tshendu – vocals (1996–1997)

== Discography ==
Wenge Musica released six studio albums during their career. Two further albums, Pile ou Face (1995) and Feux de l'amour (1997), were released as solo works by Alain Makaba and JB Mpiana, though other members of the band also took part in their production.

- Bouger Bouger Makinzu (1988)
- Kin É Bougé (1991)
- Pleins Feux (recorded in 1992) (1996)
- Kala-Yi-Boeing (1993)
- Les Anges Adorables (volumes 1 and 2) (1994)
- Pentagone (1996)
