= Martyrs Stadium =

Stadium in Kinshasa, Democratic Republic of the Congo

Coordinates: 4°19′49.5″S 15°18′36.0″E

- Martyrs Stadium
- Stade des Martyrs in 2013
- Interactive map of Martyrs Stadium
- Full name: Pentecost Martyrs Stadium
- Former names: Kamanyola Stadium (1994–1997)
- Location: Lingwala, Kinshasa, Democratic Republic of the Congo
- Capacity: 80,000
- Surface: AstroTurf

Construction
- Groundbreaking: 14 October 1988; 38 years ago
- Built: 14 October 1993; 33 years ago
- Opened: 14 September 1994; 32 years ago
- Renovated: 2008, 2021 and 2023
- Cost: US$38,000,000

Tenants
- DR Congo national football team (1994–present); AS Vita Club (1994–present); Daring Club Motema Pembe (1994–present)

The Pentecost Martyrs Stadium, commonly referred to as the Martyrs Stadium and formerly known as Kamanyola Stadium, is a national multi-purpose stadium of the Democratic Republic of the Congo, located in Lingwala, Kinshasa. With a seating capacity of 80,000, it is the largest stadium in the Democratic Republic of the Congo and the fourth-largest stadium in Africa. It serves as the home stadium for the Congolese football national team, Association Sportive Vita Club, and Daring Club Motema Pembe, making it the largest multifunctional venue in the country.

Originally constructed in 1993, the stadium was renamed in 1997 to honor the ministers, including Évariste Kimba, Jérôme Anany, Emmanuel Bamba, and Alexandre Mahamba, who were publicly hanged in Léopoldville (present-day Kinshasa) on Pentecost, 2 June 1966.

It hosted the 2023 Jeux de la Francophonie, which accommodated approximately 3,000 athletes from over 40 countries.

== History ==
=== Etymology and construction ===
Originally named "Stade Kamanyola," the name has its origins in the Kamanyola groupement, within the Walungu Territory of South Kivu Province. This border area became symbolically important to the regime of President Mobutu Sese Seko following a decisive 1964 military victory by the Armée Nationale Congolaise (ANC) against the Mulelist insurgency. The campaign, which secured the Kamanyola Bridge and contributed to the liberation of Bukavu from forces loyal to Jean Schramme, was led by Major-General Léonard Mulamba and Masiala. It was during these conflicts that Donatien Mahele Lieko Bokungu, then a young Warrant Officer, first distinguished himself, later rising to prominence in the national army.

In recognition of these military achievements, Mobutu memorialized the name Kamanyola across several state assets and personal possessions, including a presidential yacht, a military division, and subsequently commissioned the construction of "Stade Kamanyola". The stadium project was formalized through a memorandum of understanding signed in May 1987 between the Republic of Zaire and the People's Republic of China. Construction began on 14 October 1988, a date symbolically chosen to coincide with Mobutu's birthday, and concluded exactly five years later on 14 October 1993. The facility, with a seating capacity of 80,000, was constructed by a Chinese consortium at a cost of approximately $38 million.

Stade Kamanyola was officially inaugurated on 14 September 1994 with a friendly match between the Leopards of Zaire and the Flames of Malawi. It replaced Stade Tata Raphaël as the country's principal sports venue and became a centerpiece of Mobutu's vision for monumental state infrastructure. In addition to hosting matches for the national football team and top Kinshasa clubs, the stadium also accommodated fixtures involving Tout Puissant Mazembe, a prominent club based in Lubumbashi.

=== From Stade Kamanyola to Stade des Martyrs de la Pentecôte ===
Following the ousting of Mobutu from power by AFDL (Alliance des Forces Démocratiques pour la Libération du Congo-Zaïre) led by Laurent-Désiré Kabila in 1997, the stadium was renamed "Stade des Martyrs de la Pentecôte" in memory of four ministers purged by Mobutu Sese Seko and hanged at the site on 2 June 1966: Évariste Kimba, Jérôme Anany, Emmanuel Bamba, and Alexandre Mahamba. In 1998, during the Second Congo War, the venue again became the scene of violence when government troops opened fire during a football match between AS Vita Club and Daring Club Motema Pembe, leaving four people dead.

On 5 December 2004, Congo achieved its first victory over South Africa in a historic match at the Stade des Martyrs. On 12–14 October 2012, the venue played host to the 14th summit of the Organisation internationale de la Francophonie. From 28 July to 6 August 2023, it presided over the IXes Jeux de la Francophonie, a notable multi-sport event, marking the first occasion that the games were held in the country.

== Renovation (2008–2023) ==
=== Initial efforts ===
The Stade des Martyrs in 2006

By the early 2000s, Stade des Martyrs had fallen into a severe state of disrepair. In February 2006, Radio Okapi described the stadium as "slowly dying", with unsanitary conditions caused by supporters and street children (shegués) urinating throughout the facility. The stench of urine and feces made many parts of the stadium unbearable for spectators. In May 2006, urban authorities in Kinshasa took action by demolishing a dozen unauthorized houses that had been built across from the main entrance. The area was originally intended for the construction of facilities to host international sports delegations. According to local residents and stadium officials, these informal structures had occupied land reserved for future development linked to the stadium complex.

The degradation of the stadium led to serious consequences when, on 25 March 2008, Fédération Internationale de Football Association (FIFA) suspended Stade des Martyrs from the 2010 FIFA World Cup and Africa Cup of Nations qualifiers, stating that it did not meet the required international standards. The Fédération Congolaise de Football Association (FECOFA) was asked to select an alternative stadium on neutral territory where "home" matches would be played. FIFA granted a one-month reprieve, providing the Congolese government a final opportunity to renovate the stadium in line with inspection recommendations. In response, the Deputy Minister of Public Works and Infrastructure, Gervais Ntirumenyrwa Kimonyo, launched renovation efforts on 15 April 2008. The project involved ten companies and was initially budgeted at $3.5 million. Minister of Youth and Sports Willy Bakonga explained the multi-contractor approach was intended to expedite work and meet deadlines. Renovation tasks included refurbishing the locker rooms, upgrading lighting and the electronic scoreboard, installing seat numbering, and constructing a new press tribune.

Despite these efforts, work remained unfinished by early May. Contractors requested an additional $2.5 million beyond the original $3.7 million already disbursed. By 4 May 2008, the site still resembled a construction zone with unpacked furniture and construction materials scattered about. According to project architect Trésor Lufwakenda, significant progress had been made, particularly in repainting and refurbishing internal facilities. However, delays and incomplete tasks prompted the government to involve military engineers to ensure the stadium was ready on time. Interior Minister Denis Kalume Numbi threatened legal action against contractors who failed to meet deadlines. On 19 May 2008, FIFA ultimately reinstated the stadium's eligibility to host international matches.

=== Second and third phase ===
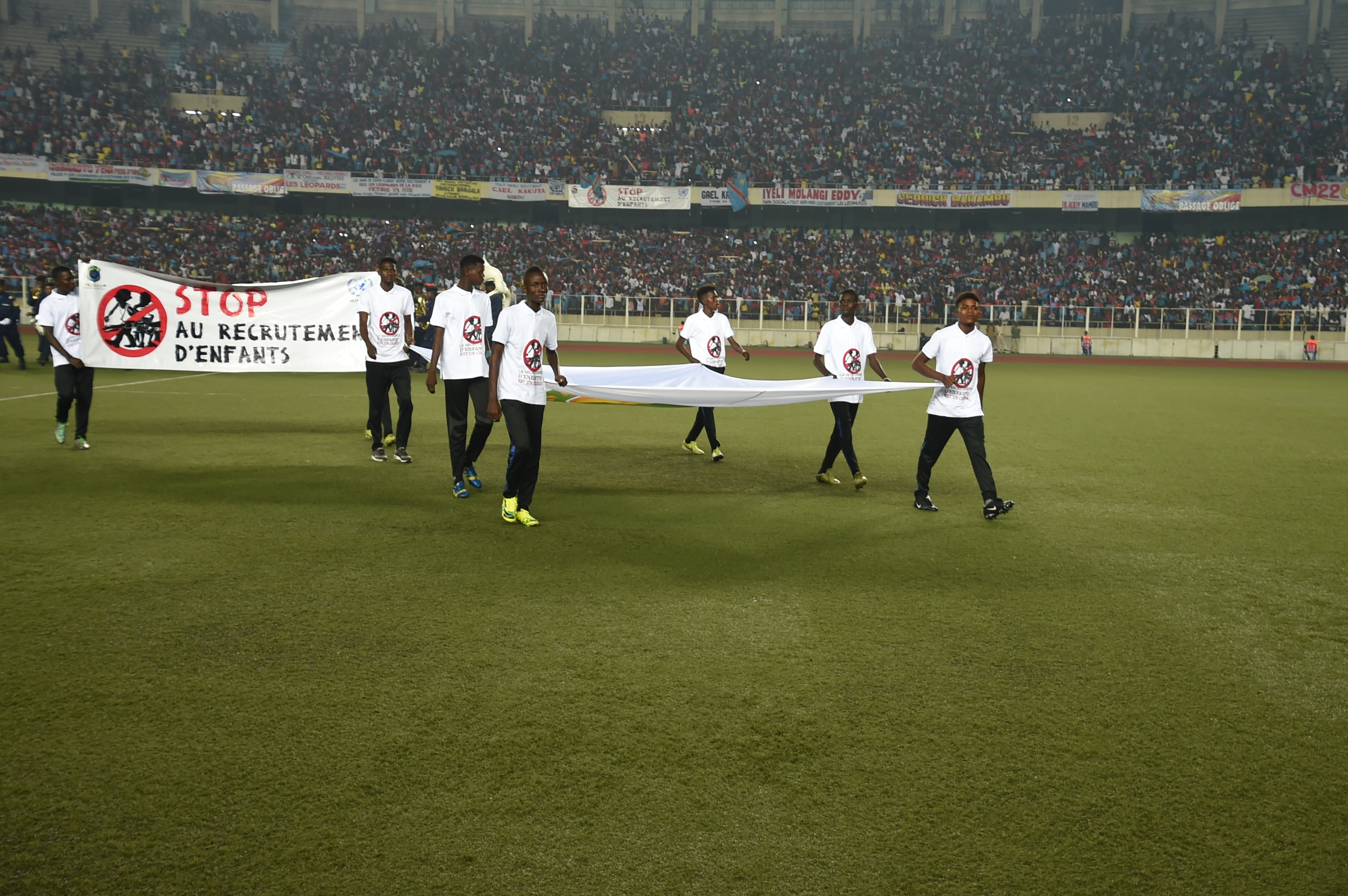
A 2017 demonstration at Stade des Martyrs advocating against the recruitment of child soldiers.

A second wave of rehabilitation began in March 2020 under the Ministry of Sports and Leisure, initially focusing on modernizing the locker rooms. However, progress was hindered by the COVID-19 pandemic, which delayed the shipment of essential equipment from Europe. By October 2020, the situation remained critical. Constant Omari, then president of FECOFA, warned of a potential closure, stating that Stade des Martyrs no longer met modern standards. FIFA required the stadium to have either a hybrid or natural grass playing surface, requirements that had yet to be addressed due to a lack of released funds. During the 47th Council of Ministers meeting on 4 September 2020, President Félix Tshisekedi instructed the government to prioritize the stadium's rehabilitation. The Council decided to reactivate the project file to ensure modernization works would be completed within a reasonable timeframe.

On 9 April 2021, President Tshisekedi launched development and rehabilitation efforts aimed at preparing the stadium to host the 9th Francophone Games. Despite these efforts, a Confederation of African Football (CAF) inspection on 4 May 2021 excluded Stade des Martyrs from the list of approved African stadiums, citing failure to meet FIFA's international standards. On 16 July 2021, the Council of Ministers approved renovation plans for seven stadiums nationwide, including Stade des Martyrs, with projected costs ranging between 3 million and 8 million USD per facility. Minister of Sports and Leisure Serge Tshembo Nkonde emphasized collaboration with the Société Nationale d'Électricité (SNEL) to ensure proper electrification. Rehabilitation work resumed on 16 July 2021 under Nkonde's supervision, targeting FIFA compliance ahead of the FIFA World Cup qualifiers scheduled for September. Renovations included the replacement of the stadium's lighting system, along with plans for the installation of a new artificial turf and seating, featuring a hybrid pitch. Despite these plans, on 22 September 2021, CAF disqualified Stade des Martyrs from hosting the third and fourth matchdays of the 2022 World Cup qualifiers, citing failure to meet minimum standards. FECOFA was instructed to select an alternative stadium by that date or face CAF designating a venue, potentially in the opponent's country. By 4 February 2022, CAF provisionally authorized Stade des Martyrs to host the DR Congo against Morocco match, contingent upon continuing refurbishment work. The stadium reopened following the installation of the new pitch. However, after subsequent assessments, CAF deemed the stadium unsuitable on 9 February 2023. The governing body reported that the completed renovations did not satisfy modern stadium standards. Key deficiencies identified included inadequate media facilities, lack of reliable internet connectivity, insufficient press conference rooms, under-equipped medical services, and inadequate locker rooms for referees. Additionally, the stadium's external perimeter areas "do not guarantee a safe and secure environment for hosting international football matches, as these areas are abandoned and without any proper maintenance".

As of April 2023, construction and site development were approximately 80% complete, with the Agence Congolaise des Grands Travaux (ACGT) overseeing the work. On 17 May 2023, President Félix inspected two gymnasiums under construction with capacities of 3,000 and 2,000 spectators. By July 2023, Stade des Martyrs was supplied with water through newly installed cisterns by REGIDESO. On 13 July 2024, Stade des Martyrs, alongside Stade TP Mazembe, received CAF approval to host matches for the 2024–2025 season.

== Controversy ==
During Laurent-Désiré Kabila's rule, the stadium became the center of controversy and criticism from human rights organizations. It was alleged to have been used as a prison for dignitaries of the former Mobutu regime and individuals suspected of collaborating with it. Reports from organizations like Journaliste en danger (JED), a Congolese non-governmental organization for the defense of press freedom affiliated with Reporters Without Borders (RSF) and the International Freedom of Expression Exchange (IFEX), highlighted the use of the stadium as a military camp, where many people were held for extended periods in dungeon-like conditions.

== Other uses ==
The stadium also hosts cultural events, concerts, and gatherings of national significance. Some notable high-profile appearances include:

=== Concerts and cultural events ===
Date	Artist and event	Attendance	Ref.
15 November 1997	King Kester Emeneya and Victoria Eleison	Nearly 95,000	
1999	JB Mpiana	–	
15 December 2001	JB Mpiana and Wenge BCBG; Concert de vérité ("concert of truth") offered as a holiday gift to Kinshasa	135,000 inside; 15,000 outside	
30 March 2002	Koffi Olomide and Quartier Latin International; To celebrate their return from international tour	80,000	
4 January 2003	Werrason and Wenge Musica Maison Mère; To celebrate their return from their European tour (May–December 2002)	Over 190,000	
21 June 2013	Werrason, Wenge Musica Maison Mère, JB Mpiana, Papa Wemba, Ferré Gola, Jossart N'Yoka Longo, Félix Wazekwa, Blaise Bula, Reddy Amisi, Mabele Elisi, and Bayuda du Congo, among others.; Bralima World Music Day Concert	–	
25 June 2016	Quartier Latin International; 30th anniversary celebration	–	
30 June 2022	Wenge Musica; Reunion performance	–	
29 October 2022	Fally Ipupa; Golden World Tour	Over 120,000	
25 December 2022	Héritier Watanabe	Below 80,000 – requested limit due to safety concerns	
24 June 2023	Ferré Gola	Over 120,000	
12 August 2023	Félix Wazekwa; CPV show	Nearly 7,000 people	

=== Political and religious events ===
Date	Figures involved and the event	Attendance	Ref.
1 June 2019	Étienne Tshisekedi's funeral, which drew significant political figures, including Félix Tshisekedi, Denise Nyakéru Tshisekedi, Paul Kagame, and João Lourenço.	Over 100,000 people	
2 February 2023	Pope Francis; Congregational assembly denouncing tribalism, xenophobia, corruption	80,000	
19 November 2023	President Félix Tshisekedi; Launch of his 2023 re-election campaign	–	
20 January 2024	President Félix Tshisekedi; Swearing-in ceremony for second term; military parade and 21-gun salute; attended by African heads of state	Over 80,000	
19 May 2024	Moise Mbiye; Concert du peuple	Over 120,000	
27 July 2024	Mike Kalambay and Maajabu Gospel; Explo Celebration	Over 120,000	

== Crowd crush incidents ==
=== Fally Ipupa ===
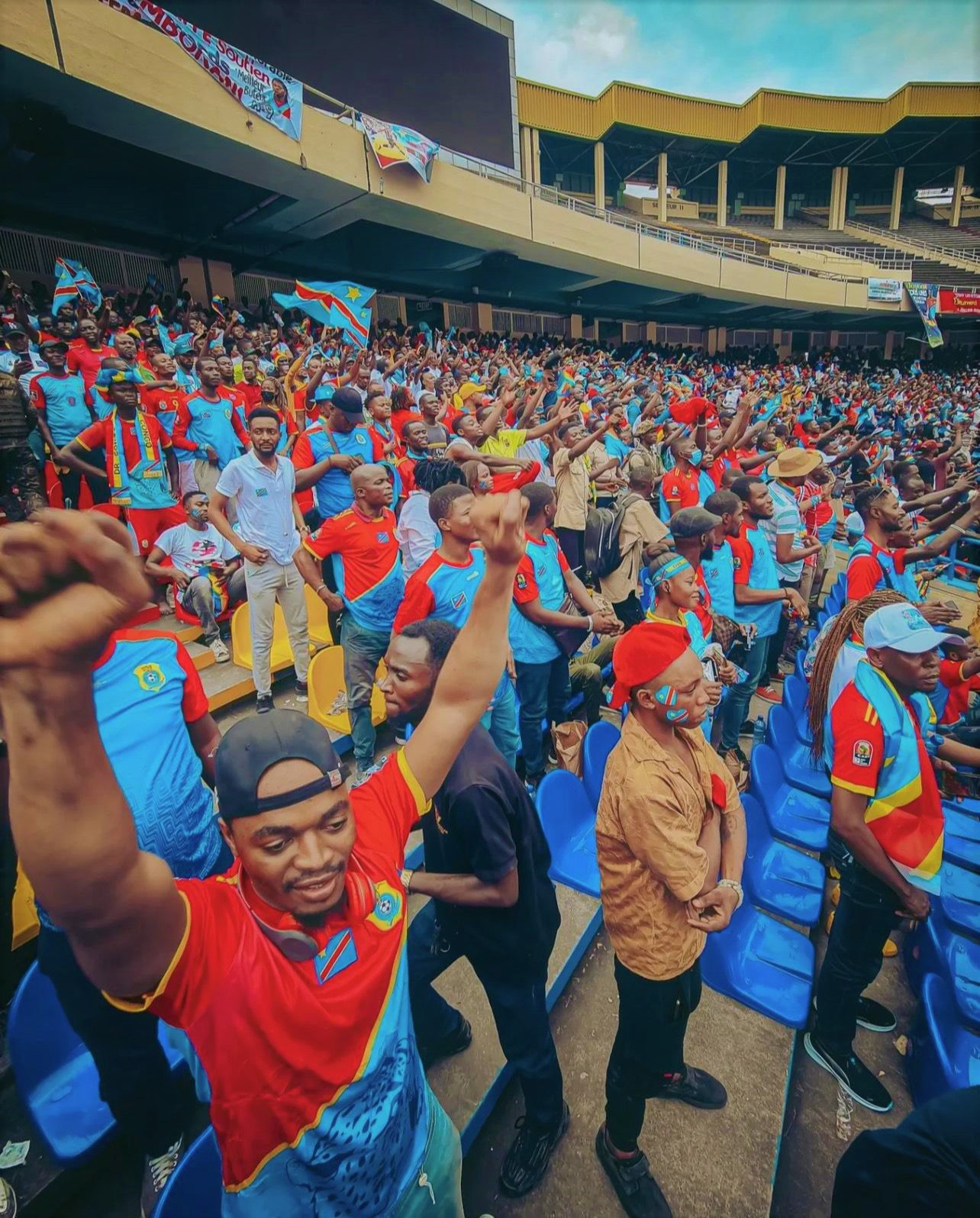
Fans of the Congolese national football team at the venue

Stade des Martyrs has been the site of several crowd-crush incidents, which have led to countless deaths and injuries over the years. One of the most significant incidents took place on 29 October 2022, during the Fally Ipupa mega-concert, which resulted in eleven deaths, including two police officers. Reports from Le Monde revealed that by 3 p.m., the stadium had reached its full capacity, with more people attempting to gain entry. Despite the venue's 80,000-person capacity, over 120,000 people showed up for the event. Le Monde reported that the high temperatures precipitated cases of suffocation among some spectators. A fatality was recorded prior to the concert's commencement, with the individual succumbing to asphyxiation. Disruptions were further exacerbated by the actions of police officers stationed at the stadium entrance, who confiscated entry documents from certain spectators and accepted bribes to permit others to enter. This caused chaos near Avenue des Huileries, where two tear gas grenades were deployed to disperse the crowd. A post-concert stampede resulted in additional deaths. The Minister of the Interior, Security, Decentralization, and Customary Affairs, Daniel Asselo Okito, attributed the stampede to the organizers, holding them accountable for exceeding the agreed-upon capacity with the police and the stadium. One of the event's organizers was detained by the Kinshasa criminal police around 10 p.m. on the evening of the concert.

=== Mike Kalambay ===
On 27 July 2024, during gospel singer Mike Kalambay's Explo Celebration concert, a crowd-crush broke out, resulting in the deaths of at least nine people and leaving many others injured, some of whom required intensive care. While authorities refrained from speculating on the cause of the crowd-crush, citing an ongoing investigation, the local music management company responsible for organizing the event attributed the chaos to an intervention by security services dealing with potential disruptors. Although the concert organizers had initially planned to accommodate the stadium and its esplanade, the rapidly sold-out tickets led to some attendees being turned away due to insufficient space. Some victims succumbed to suffocation, while others perished due to crushing in the stadium, where the playing area, corridors, seats, and stands were overcrowded.

== See also ==
- Stade Cardinal Malula
- Lists of stadiums
