= International Association of World Peace Advocates =

Non-governmental organization

- Formation: 30 January 2014
- Type: NGO Global
- Legal status: Active
- President: Per Stefson
- Website: iawpa.org

International Association of World Peace Advocates (IAWPA) is a global non-governmental organization and a participant of the United Nations Global Compact. Its objective is to promote peace and harmony in various local communities across the globe and to ensure that the aims and objectives of the United Nations in the maintenance of global peace is being achieved.

The association is a body of concerned global citizens whose interest is to promote universal peace, a just and inclusive society within the United Nations to ensure that all classes of people in our society are carried along on the schemes, programs and policies of the United Nations.

It networks international and regional organizations and recruits people of decent ethical manner as Eminent Peace Ambassadors through effective screening of nominations with special regard granted to personalities whose efforts are evident in making peace and providing benevolence to orphanage children, widows and the elderly.

As a body of Eminent Peace Ambassadors, the organization commemorates the United Nations International Observance days, decades and years with concentration at the national, state and grassroots, bringing awareness of the United Nations to people who have no knowledge of the working, functions and structure of the United Nations to enable them to share and gain knowledge on particular events, themes and subject matters.

== Purpose of the organization ==
The purpose for which the organization is established is as follows:

- To recruit individuals as volunteers to assist in the implementation of United Nations Sustainable Development Goals and also to promote United Nations volunteerism in all human endeavors.
- To foster unity, peace and harmony among and between members and the public.
- To assist in the enhancement of peace education in schools, colleges, universities, industries and places of worship and constant gathering for the purpose of using the knowledge in humanitarian service.
- To impart ethical leadership in youths by organizing leadership training courses, seminars, conferences, workshops, etc.
- To promote international friendship by organizing exchange programs and encouraging peace services and operations with other similar bodies in the world.
- To reach out to corporate bodies, churches, NGOs, schools, societies and other well-meaning bodies with the purpose of assisting people in realizing peace.
- To collaborate with international and non-governmental organizations, including the United Nations and its specialized agencies.
- To give first aid to the needy in times of peace and war.
- To encourage and develop the spirit of humanitarian service in people especially the youths, by establishing formations of the organization in approved institutions, strategic positions and places
- To establish peace clubs in villages, cities, towns, schools and churches and to use such clubs to teach peace and first aid principles and practice.
- To help the elderly/ageing people, promote and protect their rights and ensure that they are treated with decorum and respect.

== Eminent Peace Ambassadors ==
Some IAWPA (UN) Eminent Peace Ambassadors include:

- George Weah, president of Liberia
- Hope Uzodinma, governor of Imo State
- TVC News, 24-hour television news channel
- Bishop Samuel Ben Owusu
- Mike Ozekhome, Senior Advocate of Nigeria
- Primate Elijah Babatunde Ayodele
- Amb. Stephanie Nnadi, CEO/Founder of One Percent International
- Juwon Lawal, founder of Crestal Group
- His Eminence, King (Dr.) I. U. Otuo Ogbalakon IX of Unyeada Kingdom
- David Evans-Uhegbu, founder of Jungle Entertainment Ventures
- Amb.(Dr.) Jeremiah Emmanuel Adeleko
- Amb Proph. Dr Richard Godwin Magenge (Country director Tanzania)
- Amb.(M.Sc.dba) Edmond Murati, Head of IT GOV from Republic of Kosovo
- Amb Dr Mawazo pangamasasi Ndanzi
- Amb Proph.Dr Geofrey Jikijera (country representertive Botswana)
- Amb Bishop Gwandu Saraf Mwangasa (Secretary of organisation Tanzania)

== See also ==
- United Nations Global Compact
- Global Reporting Initiative
- Corporate social responsibility
- Sustainable development
