= Bill Clinton Kalonji =

Congolese singer (born 1979)

- Born: Didier Kalonji; July 4, 1979 (age 46)
- Origin: Ngiri-Ngiri, Kinshasa, Democratic Republic of the Congo
- Genres: Soukous- Congolese rumba-Afrobeats
- Occupation: Singer-songwriter
- Instrument: Vocals
- Past members: Wenge Musica Maison Mère, Les Marquis De Maison Mere

Didier Kalonji Mukeba (born July 4, 1979), Known professionally by his stage name as Bill Clinton and Monseigneur Dangwe or Macintosh is a Congolese singer-songwriter, dancer and animator. He was a member of Wenge Musica Maison Mere orchestra by Werrason from 1997 to 2004. The name "Kalonji", as in Albert Kalonji, is a name traditionally associated with leaders of the Luba people.

== Career ==
Bill Clinton decided to leave his first the group, Wenge Musica Maison Mere, in 2004 and start his own career. In 2004 he, Ferré Gola and J.D.T Mulopwe created a new group called Les Marquis or Les Marquis de Maison Mere and later left to create Marquis de Samourais. The group released several albums but later broke up.

In 2006-2007 "Clinton" was among a number of African musicians threatened with legal action for breach of contract by a music producer based in Paris; no action was taken against him. Having begun his career as an atalaku, he was one of few to successfully make the transition to bandleader.

== Discography ==
=== Studio albums ===
2011: Palpitation totale

2013: Tshikimbwa 2 (Opération Obama)

2015: Kulumbimbi

2015: Pression

2015: Fuku Shima (Le roi pharaon)

=== Singles ===
2012: Excès D'Amour

2012: Mukusa Mukongo

2012: Mukuwa Makoso

2012: Love Moi

2012: Kulumbimbi

2012: Condition

2012: Congo Vas Changer

2012: Kasonda

2013: Koli Villa

2013: Hi Brenda

2013: Kaylie

2013: Amède Ngassaki

2013: Sagess

2013: Vanité Des Vanités
