= Palais du Peuple (Kinshasa) =

Seat of the National Assembly and Senate of the Democratic Republic of the Congo

Coordinates: 4.3322°S 15.3031°E

Palais du Peuple, photographed in 2013

The People's Palace or Palace of the People (French: Palais du Peuple) is the seat of the National Assembly and the Senate in Kinshasa, Democratic Republic of Congo, formerly Zaire. It was completed in 1979 with a line of credit from the People's Republic of China. It has witnessed key moments in the country's political landscape, bearing witness to historic debates, legislative triumphs, and the exercise of democratic values. The building serves as a gathering place for lawmakers and a venue for official ceremonies.

== Construction ==
The structure (along with a sugar refinery built in Kisanga and destroyed in the Congo Civil War) was constructed with an interest-free credit line of US$100 million in cooperation with the People's Republic of China from 1975 to 1979, after being commissioned by President Mobutu Sese Seko following his visit to China in 1973. The architecture was inspired by the Great Hall of the People designed by Zhang Bo (1911–1999) in Beijing. The complex also includes the Kinshasa Martyrs' Stadium, contracted at the same time as the palace, a FIFA-class venue built by China in 1994. The remaining debt of US$42.3 million was forgiven by the Chinese Government in 1983.

== Post-Zaire period ==
The Palace of the People in 2009

In June 1997, after the Alliance of Democratic Forces for the Liberation of Congo (AFDL) under Laurent-Désiré Kabila seized power, the Parliament of the Republic left the Palace of the Nation to settle in the Palace of the People.

Laurent-Désiré Kabila, president of the DRC, had overthrown United States' ally Mobutu, who died in exile in Morocco. After his assassination by a bodyguard in January 2001, Laurent-Désiré Kabila lay in state at the People's Palace for three days before being interred.

In December 2013, famed African rumba musician Tabu Ley Rochereau, sometimes known as "the African Elvis", lay in state at the People's Palace.

On 19 January 2015, after appeals from opposition parties standing against Laurent-Désiré Kabila's son and elected president Joseph Kabila's proposed plan to delay the scheduled 2016 elections until after a burdensome national census had been held, protesters gathered in front of the People's Palace. They were subsequently attacked with tear gas and live ammunition by government security forces. At least 42 people were killed in the violence.

== See also ==
- Parliament of the Democratic Republic of the Congo
- National Assembly of the Democratic Republic of Congo
- Senate of the Democratic Republic of the Congo
