= List of people from the Democratic Republic of the Congo =

This is a list of people from the Democratic Republic of the Congo.

== Actors ==
- Topistar Di Congo a Congolese Entrepreneur fashion designer tech expert humanitarian and activist

== Artists ==
- Topistar Di Congo a Congolese Entrepreneur fashion designer tech expert humanitarian and activist
- Moseka Yogo Ambake (c. 1956–2019) — painter
- Kiripi Katembo (c. 1979–2015) — photographer, documentary filmmaker and painter
- Gosette Lubondo (b. 1993) — photographer
- Albert Mongita (c. 1916–1985) — actor, dramatist, painter, filmmaker and theatre director
- Chéri Samba (b. 1956) — painter
- Pamela Tulizo (b. 1994) — photographer
- Bodys Isek Kingelez (c. 1948–2015) — sculptor
- Freddy Tsimba (b. 1967) — sculptor
- Eddy Kamuanga Ilunga (b. 1991) — painter
- Solange Mindondo (c. 1971–2019) — actress
- Maman Bolingo (c. 1957–2025) — actress

== Athletes ==
- Eshele Botende (b. 1970) — retired football goalkeeper, played for Kaizer Chiefs F.C.and Club Sport Marítimo
- Muteba Kidiaba (b. 1976) — football goalkeeper playing for TP Mazembe football club and the national team
- Jonathan Kuminga (b. 2002) — professional basketball player for Golden State Warriors
- Siadabida Manda (b. 1970) — professional association football player, played for a number of clubs in Greece
- Emmanuel Mudiay (b. 1996) — professional basketball player for Cangrejeros de Santurce of the Baloncesto Superior Nacional (BSN)
- Andy Mulumba (b. 1990) — professional American football player Green Bay Packers
- Dikembe Mutombo (b. 1966) — former basketball player who played for several teams in NBA
- Jean-Jacques Ndala (born 1987) — FIFA-listed association football referee.
- Steve Zakuani (b. 1988) — association football player, currently playing for Seattle Sounders FC in The MLS
- Youssouf Mulumbu (b. 1987) — professional association football player
- Marie-Antoinette Katoto (b. 1998) — Congolese-French professional association football player

== Musicians ==
- Franco Luambo (c. 1938–1989) — singer, guitarist, composer, and bandleader
- Léon Bukasa (c. 1925–1974) — singer, songwriter, arranger, and multi-instrumentalist
- Manuel d'Oliveira (c. 1915–1988) — singer, songwriter, performer, guitarist, and bandleader
- Papa Noël Nedule (c. 1940–2024) — singer-songwriter and guitarist
- Bébé Atalaku (b. 1962) — singer-songwriter and atalaku
- Nono Monzuluku (c. 1960–2024) — singer-songwriter and atalaku
- Tabu Ley Rochereau (c. 1940–2013) — singer and songwriter
- Ferré Gola (b. 1976) — singer-songwriter and dancer
- Franglish (b. 1994) — Congolese-French rapper and singer
- Claude (b. 2003) — Congolese-Dutch singer
- Tusse (b. 2002) — Congolese-Swedish singer
- Fally Ipupa (b. 1977) — singer-songwriter, dancer, philanthropist, guitarist and producer
- Le Grand Kallé (c. 1930–1983) — singer-songwriter, composer, and bandleader
- Koffi Olomide (b. 1956) — singer, dancer, producer, and composer
- Maître Gims (b. 1986) — Congolese-French singer-songwriter, rapper
- Dr. Nico Kasanda (c. 1939–1985) — guitarist, composer, singer-songwriter
- Naza (b. 1993) — Congolese-French rapper, singer-songwriter
- Fabregas (b. 1987) — singer-songwriter, dancer and record producer
- Barbara Kanam (b. 1973) — singer-songwriter
- Yxng Bane (b. 1996) — British-Congolese rapper, singer-songwriter
- Keblack (b. 1992) — Congolese-French rapper, singer-songwriter
- Papa Wemba (c. 1949–2016) — singer-songwriter, sapeur, dancer, and cultural icon
- Pépé Kallé (c. 1951–1998) — singer-songwriter and bandleader
- Damso (b. 1992) — Congolese-Belgian rapper, singer-songwriter
- M'pongo Love (c. 1956–1990) — singer-songwriter
- Tshala Muana (c. 1958–2022) — singer-songwriter and performer
- Awilo Longomba (b. 1962) — singer-songwriter and drummer
- M'bilia Bel (b. 1959) — singer, songwriter and dancer
- Lokua Kanza (b. 1958) — singer-songwriter, guitarist, and producer
- Werrason (b. 1965) — singer-songwriter, and bandleader
- Sam Mangwana (b. 1945) — singer and songwriter
- Jossart N'Yoka Longo (b. 1953) — singer-songwriter and producer.
- Wendo Kolosoy (c. 1925–2008) — guitarist, singer-songwriter, and producer
- Ray Lema (b. 1946) — singer-songwriter, pianist, guitarist
- Cindy Le Coeur (b. 1982) — recording artist, singer, and dancer
- Lutumba Simaro (c. 1938–2019) — singer-songwriter, composer, and bandleader
- Nyboma Mwan'dido (b. 1952) — singer, songwriter and dancer
- King Kester Emeneya (c. 1956–2014) — singer and bandleader
- L'Or Mbongo (b. 1978) — singer-songwriter and cantor
- Yondo Sister (b. 1958) — singer-songwriter and dancer
- Madilu System (c. 1952–2007) — singer-songwriter
- Bimi Ombale (c. 1952–2011) — singer-songwriter and drummer
- Baloji (b. 1978) — Congolese-Belgian rapper, singer-songwriter and producer
- Bramsito (b. 1996) — Congolese-French singer-songwriter and producer
- Innoss'B (b. 1997) — singer-songwriter, rapper, percussionist, and dancer
- Gaz Mawete (b. 1991) — singer-songwriter, dancer
- Héritier Watanabe (b. 1982) — songwriter-singer, dancer
- Bill Clinton Kalonji (b. 1979) — singer-songwriter, dancer and animator
- Moise Mbiye (b. 1962) — singer-songwriter and pastor
- Mike Kalambay (b. 1978) — singer-songwriter, pastor and dancer
- Dena Mwana (b. 1986) — singer, composer and dancer
- Lu Kala (b. 1995) — Congolese-Canadian singer-songwriter and dancer
- Céline Banza (b. 1997) — singer-songwriter, dancer and guitarist
- Jipson Butukondolo — composer, vocalist and entertainer
- Diblo Dibala (b. 1954) — singer, director, arranger, composer, producer, and guitarist
- Dindo Yogo (c. 1955–2000) — singer-songwriter, and dancer
- Ndombe Opetum (c. 1944–2012) — recording artist, composer and singer
- Youssoupha (b. 1979) — Congolese-French rapper and songwriter
- Mose Se Sengo (c. 1945–2019) — guitarist, composer and bandleader
- Mohombi (b. 1986) — Congolese-Swedish musician, singer-songwriter, composer, and dancer
- Josky Kiambukuta (c. 1949–2021) — performing artist, singer-songwriter, and composer
- Kanda Bongo Man (b. 1955) — singer-songwriter, dancer and bandleader
- Abeti Masikini (c. 1954–1994) — singer-songwriter, bandleader, and performer
- Marie Misamu (c. 1974–2016) — cantor, songwriter and composer
- Youlou Mabiala (b. 1947) — recording artist, composer, songwriter, and singer
- Bozi Boziana (b. 1951) — singer-songwriter and bandleader
- Kaysha (b. 1974) — singer-songwriter, rapper and producer
- Mayaula Mayoni (b. 2010) — recording artist, composer and singer
- Young Paris (b. 1988) — Congolese-American singer-songwriter, rapper and producer
- Evoloko Jocker (b. 1954) — singer-songwriter, dancer
- Jessy Matador (b. 1983) — Congolese-French singer-songwriter
- Jean-Bosco Mwenda (c. 1930–1990) — guitarist and singer.
- Avelino (b. 1993) — Congolese-British-rapper and singer
- Bouro Mpela (b. 1975) — singer, dancer, and performer
- Dadju (b. 1991) — Congolese-French singer-songwriter and composer
- Iyenga — singer-songwriter
- Tiakola (b. 1999) — Congolese-French rapper and singer
- Jimmy Omonga (b. 1976) — singer-songwriter, guitarist
- Kalash Criminel (b. 1995) — Congolese-French rapper and producer
- Kasaloo Kyanga (c. 1957–2011) — singer-songwriter, guitarist, and composer
- Marie Daulne (b. 1964) — Belgian-Congolese singer-songwriter, arranger and choreographer
- Ninho (b. 1996) — Congolese-French rapper and producer
- Gradur (b. 1990) — Congolese-French rapper
- Singuila (b. 1977) — singer-songwriter
- Alicios Theluji (b. 1987) — singer-songwriter and dancer
- Laurette la Perle (b. 1989) — singer-songwriter, model and businesswoman
- Soulé (b. 1995) — Irish-Congolese singer-songwriter
- Philippe Lando Rossignol (c. 1935–2004) — singer and recording artist
- Lous and the Yakuza (b. 1996) — Congolese-Belgian singer-songwriter, rapper, model, and artist
- Lucie Eyenga (c. 1934–1987) — singer and songwriter
- Nathalie Makoma (b. 1982) — Congolese-Dutch singer-songwriter
- Zola (b. 1999) — Congolese-French rapper and producer
- Syran Mbenza (b. 1950) — guitarist, singer-songwriter
- Lovy Longomba (b. 1986) — songwriter, pastor, prophet, producer, musician, and life coach
- Samba Mapangala (b. 1955) — singer-songwriter, and bandleader
- Patsha Bay — singer-songwriter
- Jaysix Abdalah (b. 1989) — singer-songwriter
- Cor Akim (b. 1992) — singer-songwriter, and pianist
- Pierre Kwenders (b. 1985) — singer and rapper
- Tshanda Sangwa (b. 1996) — singer-songwriter
- Serge Le Griot (b. 1995) — singer-songwriter
- Tresor (b. 1987) — singer-songwriter, music producer, entrepreneur and philanthropist
- Adios Alemba (b. 1962) — singer-songwriter and producer
- Adamo Ekula — singer-songwriter and dancer
- Ada Muangisa (b. 1953) — guitarist, singer-songwriter
- BM (b. 1992) — singer-songwriter
- Ricardo Lemvo (b. 1957) — singer-songwriter
- Kristy Diamond — singer-songwriter
- Jungeli — Congolese-French singer-songwriter
- Johnny Bokelo (c. 1940–1995) — singer-songwriter, guitarist, and dancer
- Paul Ebengo Isenge (c. 1934–1990) — singer-songwriter, guitarist, arranger
- Béatrice Beyou Ciel (b. 1967) — singer-songwriter and dancer
- Antoinette Etisomba Lokindji (c. 1950–2002) — singer-songwriter and dancer
- Anita Mwarabu (b. 1987) — singer, composer and author
- Amanda Malela (b. 1989) — multilingual singer, composer and dancer
- Déesse Mukangi (b. 1969) — vocalist, songwriter and dancer
- Abby Surya — singer-songwriter
- Rosny Kayiba — singer-songwriter
- Mj30 (b. 1986) — singer-songwriter
- Sista Becky — rapper, singer, dancer, and lyricist
- Sarah Kalume (b. 1990) — singer-songwriter and dancer
- Ya Levis Dalwear (b. 1994) — singer-songwriter and dancer
- Deborah Lukalu (b. 1994) — singer, composer and dancer
- Sandra Mbuyi (b. 1984) — singer-songwriter and dancer
- JB Mpiana (b. 1967) — singer-songwriter, dancer, choreographer
- But Na Filet (b. 1986) — singer-songwriter, dancer
- Félix Wazekwa (b. 1962) — singer-songwriter and dancer
- Souzy Kasseya (b. 1949) — guitarist, singer-songwriter, composer, and multi-instrumentalist
- JDT Mulopwe (b. 1972) — singer-songwriter and dancer
- Rebo Tchulo (b. 1996) — singer-songwriter, dancer
- Celeo Scram (b. 1978) — rapper, singer-songwriter
- Robinio Mundibu (b. 1985) — singer-songwriter, dancer
- Bumba Massa (b. 1945) — singer-songwriter
- Faya Tess (b. 1966) — singer and composer
- Debaba (c. 1961–2011) — singer-songwriter and composer
- Reddy Amisi (b. 1960) — singer-songwriter. He is known for his smooth voice and dynamic performances
- Ntaba 2 London — singer-songwriter and dancer
- Gaz Fabilouss — rapper, producer and bandleader
- Ryan De La Cruz — singer, actor, songwriter, model, director and producer
- Sangana Yala — singer and composer
- Gloria Bash — singer-songwriter
- Mauvais Djo — Congolese-French rapper and songwriter
- BabyDaiz — Congolese-born, South African recording artist, rapper, and songwriter
- Willy Mbembe — trumpeter and composer
- Likinga Redo (c. 1954–2013) — singer-songwriter

== Entrepreneur ==
- Topistar Di Congo — fashion designer and technology professional
- Gabriel Zagabe Muzusa (b. 1978) — Congolese businessperson and politician
- Arlette Amuli (b. 1995) — Congolese American content creator, social media personality, and producer
- Johnny Moko (d. 2026) — Congolese-born British music promoter and events organiser.

== Politicians ==
- Noëlla Ayeganagato (b. 1994) — Vice-Minister of Foreign Affairs in 2025
- Vital Balla (b. 1936)
- Kudianga Bayokisa (b. 1971) — lawyer and politician who served as Minister of Trade in the Second Matata government (2014–2016)
- Ève Bazaiba (b. 1965) — lawyer, Secretary General, and environmentalist
- Jean-Pierre Bemba (b.1962)
- Pierre Marini Bodho (b. 1938)
- Léon Kengo wa Dondo (b. 1935) — former Prime Minister of the Democratic Republic of the Congo
- Antoine Gizenga (1925–2019) — Congolese Prime Minister and candidate for President
- Laurent-Désiré Kabila (c. 1939–2001)
- Joseph Kabila (b. 1971) — fourth President of the Democratic Republic of the Congo
- Clémentine Shakembo Kamanga (b. 1950) — diplomat and writer
- Célestin Tunda Ya Kasende — former Deputy Prime Minister, Minister of Justice, and Keeper of the Seals in the Ilunga government
- Patrice Lumumba (c. 1925–1961) — first democratically elected Prime Minister of the Democratic Republic of the Congo
- Roger Lumbala (b. 1958) — member of parliament of Democratic Republic of the Congo and former rebel leader
- Christophe Lutundula — Vice Prime Minister and Foreign Minister of the Democratic Republic of the Congo
- Alphonse Maindo — political scientist
- Raïssa Malu — physicist, educator and politician, Minister of National Education and Citizenship since 2024
- Martin Ntenda — Deputy for Kazumba
- Mobutu Sese Seko (c. 1930–1997) — President of Zaire
- Félix Tshisekedi (b. 1963) — President of the Democratic Republic of the Congo since 2019
- Daniel Mukoko Samba
- Mabi Mulumba (b. 1941)

== Activists ==
- Denis Mukwege (b. 1955) — gynecologist and human rights activist.
- Annie Matundu Mbambi — journalist and women's rights activist.
- Léonnie Kandolo (b. 1960) — consultant and trainer in the context of human rights
- Topistar Di Congo — Humanitarian activist

== Other ==
- Alphonsine Cheusi (born 1955) — Constitutional Court judge
- Celine Tendobi (born 1974) — doctor of obstetrics and gynecology

== See also ==
- List of Democratic Republic of the Congo writers
- Lists of people by nationality
