= Maman Bolingo =

Congolese actress (1957–2025)

- Born: Marie Clémentine Odia Kabasukupa; 18 November 1957; Mbuji-Mayi, Belgian Congo
- Died: 23 March 2025 (aged 68); Morocco
- Citizenship: Democratic Republic of the Congo
- Education: National Institute of Arts, Kinshasa
- Occupation: Actress
- Years active: 1975–2025
- Children: 5

Marie Clémentine Odia Kabasukupa (November 18, 1957 – March 23, 2025), professionally known as Maman Bolingo, was a Congolese actress. She earned acclaim for her work with the Salongo theatre group and Théâtre de chez nous. With over forty years in the realm of popular theatre, she became well-known for her unique natural hairstyle, which inspired numerous female performers. Her most notable performance was in the 2000 film "Maman Mabé".

== Early life ==
Bolingo was born on November 18, 1957, in Mbuji-Mayi, the capital of the Kasaï Oriental province, to parents Christine Tshituka and Marcel Muboyayi. She received her training in dramaturgy at the National Institute of Arts (INA) and furthered her education in the audiovisual field at the Congolese Audiovisual Institute, where she specialized in directing, shooting, and staging.

== Career ==
Bolingo became a member of the theatre group known as the "Salongo" troupe, which was founded by the late Congolese producer, director, and stage manager, Tshitenge N'Sana, who was associated with the Zairian office of radio and television (OZRT), now recognized as the Congolese National Radio and Television (RTNC).

Bolingo was known for her distinctive punk-era hairstyle, charisma, and unwavering dedication to her craft. She is now celebrated as a member of the artistic generation that revitalized Congolese culture during Mobutu's rule, a period when theatre, music, and popular arts provided the community with moments of genuine joy and togetherness.

== Personal life ==
Bolingo had five children, comprising three daughters and two sons.

== Death ==
Bolingo died on Sunday, March 23, 2025, in Morocco after battling an illness. After enduring more than two years of health challenges, she was diagnosed with pancreatic disease. Bolingo fought against this condition for an extended period and traveled to Morocco for treatment, with the assistance of Denise Nyakeru Tshisekedi, the First Lady of the Democratic Republic of Congo.

== See also ==
- Ursule Peshanga
- Jackie Shako Diala Anahengo
- Bellevue Kandy
- Daddy Dikambala
