= Solange Mindondo =

Congolese actress and dancer (1971-2019)

- Born: Solange Ngolomingi Lobuku Mindondo; 31 December 1971; Kinshasa, Zaire (modern-day Democratic Republic of the Congo)
- Died: 30 July 2019 (aged 47); Kinshasa, Democratic Republic of the Congo
- Citizenship: Congolese
- Education: National Institute of Arts
- Occupations: Actress; dancer
- Notable work: Bolingo Ya Moyeke (1994), Pasi Ya Mokili (1997)

Solange Ngolomingi Lobuku Mindondo (31 December 1971 – 30 July 2019), professionally known as Solange Mindondo, was a Congolese actress and dancer.

She trained in humanities before continuing her studies at the National Institute of Arts in Kinshasa. She then joined the Salongo group of national radio and television.

== Biography ==
Solange Ngolomingi Lobuku Mindondo was born on 31 December 1971 in Kinshasa, in what was then Zaire (now the Democratic Republic of the Congo). She began acting with the group Salongo, founded by the late Tshitenge N'sana, first learning as an apprentice and later earning a permanent spot after demonstrating her talents.

Mindondo successfully integrated into the group, which included notable comic talents such as Masumu, Kwedi, Ebale, Mopepe, Bomengo, Bolingo, Mabele, Masasi, Doudou and Shaba. She also made a brief appearance on the Radio Télévision nationale congolaise (RTNC) before joining the Mongita hall, the central venue of the Congolese national theatre, where she devoted thirty years of her career to its ballet division, as well as to her family home located in Lemba, Kinshasa.

== Death ==
Mindondo experienced health problems on 29 July 2019 and died on 30 July 2019 at the Kinshasa General Hospital following a cardiac arrest.

== Funeral ==
A theatre and music festival was held in Kinshasa from 8–13 August 2019 in tribute to the actress. She was buried on 15 August in Kinshasa. Artists Deplick and Mignon Abraham performed at Mindondo's funeral, also attended by Félix Wazekwa. Member of Parliament Henriette Wamu visited the Mindondo family to offer her condolences, traveling to Lemba to share her condolences.

== See also ==
- Maman Bolingo
- Jackie Shako Diala Anahengo
