= Guegue (siren) =

Urban legend in the DRC

Guegue is an urban legend in the Democratic Republic of the Congo. It refers to a supernatural seducer, which various musicians allude to in their lyrics.

== History ==
=== First mentions ===
The former singer of the Latin Quarter, Babia Ndonga Chokoro, mentioned the demon in the 1994 song "Détresse."

In 2015, Pastor Moise Mbiye said the name guegue in a sermon.

=== Rumor spread ===
Rumors of "Guegue" began circulating in February 2017, when the singer-songwriter Moise Mbiye released his album Héros. In the song "Tango Naye", he was accused of having summoned the siren by saying "Sors au nom de Guégue", instead of "Sors au nom de Jesus." When people heard the rumor, the pastor started losing fans after he started to think that he was part of the illuminati, or that he had a fetish to approach people with his music and his church, Cité Bethel; the pastor denied it. The song's music video was also criticized by people saying he had used Freemason signs and Buddhism.

Slowly, more and more Christian singers were accused. One of these singers was Mike Kalambay. All the singers came precisely from DR Congo. Opponents of Kabila called "combattants" began to have reasons to boycott the events of Congolese pastors in Europe.

=== Identity ===
Later, the Congolese prophet John Ngefa declared that the supposed siren was the siren of seduction and that Moise Mbiye had invoked it to seek women. He also claimed that he had removed the "Guegue" spirit from Mbiye's body.

== Songs that mention Guegue ==
- Tango naye by Moise Mbiye
- Mokonzi na ngai by Mike Kalambay
- Tambola malembe by Moise Mbiye
- Détresse by Koffi Olomide
- Nzambe ya ba défi by Marie Misamu
