= Defao =

Congolese singer and songwriter (1958–2021)

Défao
- Born: François Lulendo Matumona; 31 December 1958; Kinshasa, Democratic Republic of the Congo
- Died: 27 December 2021 (aged 62) Douala, Cameroon
- Genres: Ndombolo; Congolese rumba; soukous
- Occupations: Singer; dancer; songwriter; bandleader
- Years active: 1976–2021
- Formerly of: Suka Movema; Forgo Stars; Korotoro; Somo West; Grand Zaïko Wawa; Choc Stars; Big Stars

François Lulendo Matumona (31 December 1958 – 27 December 2021), known professionally as Général Défao or Défao, was a Congolese singer-songwriter, dancer and bandleader. Born in Kinshasa, he began performing at the age of 17 with local groups such as Suka Movema, Forgo Stars, Korotoro, and Somo West before joining Félix Manuaku Waku's band Grand Zaïko Wawa in 1981. In partnership with Djo Poster, known as "Grand Muyaka", he quickly became a crowd favorite in Kinshasa for his stage presence and innovative dance moves.

Défao rose to prominence in the 1980s as a member of soukous band Choc Stars, where his collaborations with guitarist Roxy Tshimpaka and atalaku Ditutala popularized the Roboti-Robota dance. During this period he recorded a string of successful songs, including duets with Debaba, and established himself as one of the defining voices of Congolese popular music. In 1991, at the height of his popularity, he co-founded his own band, Big Stars, which produced several hits that became staples of soukous and ndombolo, such as "Copinage", "Sam Samitanga", "Agence courage", "Maintenance", "Sala Noki", "Piss-cass", and "Famille Kikuta". Through Big Stars, he also fostered the careers of younger musicians and worked alongside leading Congolese artists, including Mbilia Bel, Papa Wemba, and Koffi Olomide.

From the 2000s onward, Défao continued to perform, often from a base in Kenya, while his influence remained strong across Central and East Africa. He died in Douala, Cameroon, on 27 December 2021, from complications related to COVID-19.

== Early life and career ==
=== 1958–1980: Childhood, education and music debut ===
Défao was born François Lulendo Matumona on 31 December 1958 in Léopoldville (now Kinshasa), in what was then the Belgian Congo (now the Democratic Republic of the Congo). In the 1970s, during Mobutu Sese Seko's cultural authenticity campaign (recours à l'authenticité), his parents added the post-name "Tulendo" in accordance with the regime's policy to Africanize personal identities.

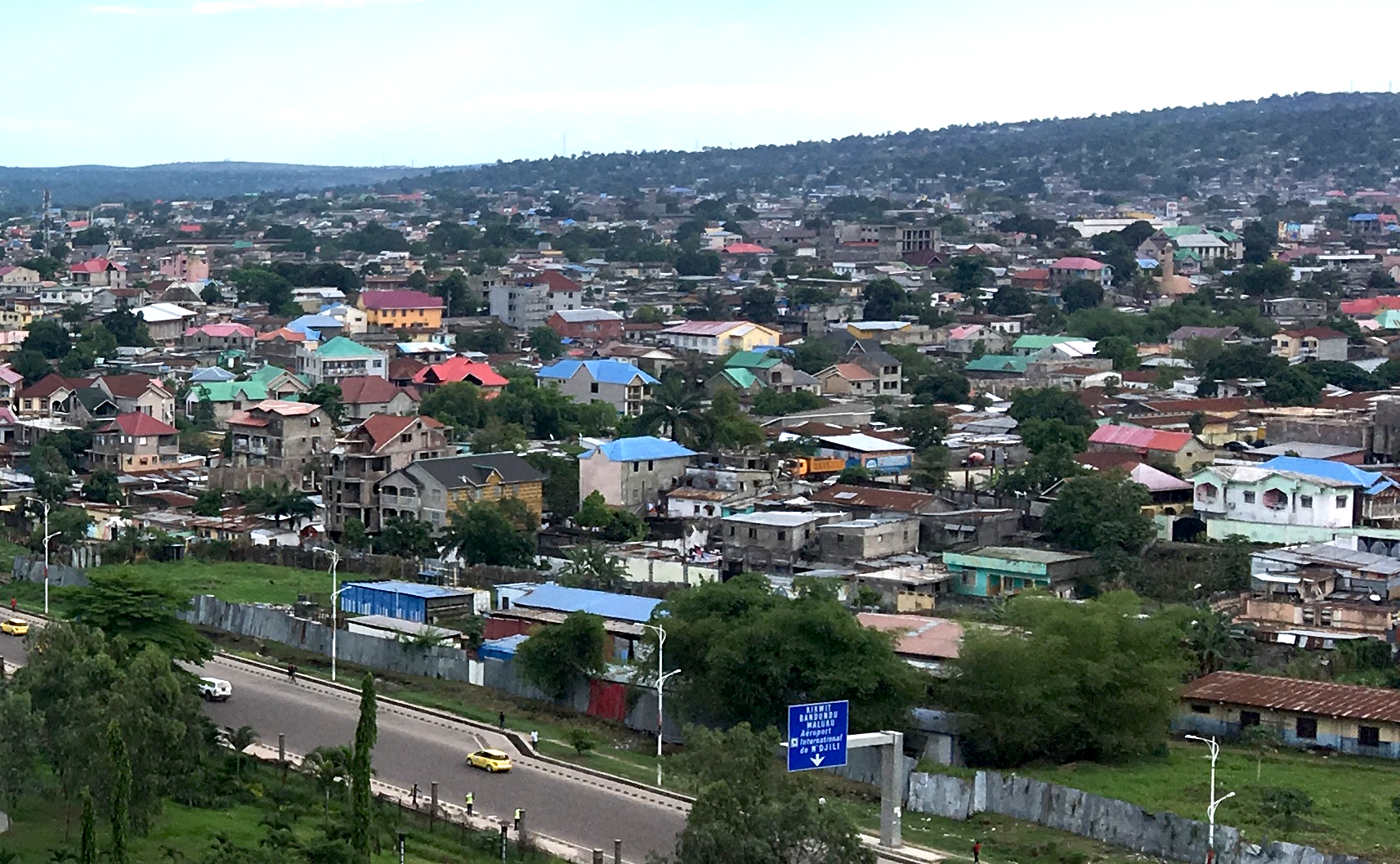
Lemba, a commune in Kinshasa where Défao was raised.

Défao was raised in the Kinshasa quartier of Lemba, specifically in the quartier of Foire. Like many young urbanites of the era, he adopted a sobriquet Fanfan, an affectionate diminutive of François. The Matumona family later relocated to Bumbu, Kinshasa, where Défao began to explore his musical interests. His earliest involvement in music is disputed: according to Congolese music journalist Zéphyrin Nkumu Assana Kirika, Défao entered the Kinshasa music scene through the local band Suka Movema, later performing with groups such as Forgo Stars, Korotoro, and Somo West. However, another commentator, Samuel Malonga, posits that Défao's formative experience occurred in a local band that later evolved into Fogo Star, possibly the same as Suka Movema.

To dissuade his son from a musical career, Défao's father enrolled him in a boarding school in Inkisi (located in Kongo Central) in 1969. In Inkisi, he met a teacher who was also a musician, and who facilitated his entry into the school band Somo West. The band quickly garnered regional attention in towns such as Kimpese and Mbanza-Ngungu. Défao distinguished himself within Somo West as a singer, dancer, and interpreter of popular hits such as "Lisuma Ya Zazu" by Papa Wemba and Yoka Lokole. His performances earned him the nickname "Papa Wemba of Inkisi".

=== 1981–1990: Grand Zaïko Wawa and Choc Stars ===
Although he initially aspired to join Papa Wemba's band, Viva La Musica, Défao's path ultimately led elsewhere. In 1981, guitarist Félix Manuaku Waku reconstituted his band Grand Zaïko Wawa during the Jubilé Ambiance festivities in Ndjili, Kinshasa. While retreating in Inkisi with the band, Manuaku heard of Défao's reputation and recruited him into Grand Zaïko Wawa. Arriving in Kinshasa with the band, Défao (now renamed Défao) attracted national attention as a performer, known for his voice and choreographic flair. With Grand Zaïko Wawa, he formed a notable partnership with Djo Poster (also known as "Grand Muyaka") and introduced the dance "Benda singa/Parachuté" and a signature animation cry. Around this time, Défao released his debut vinyl single, "Salima Na Ngai", and rapidly became the band's lead vocalist.

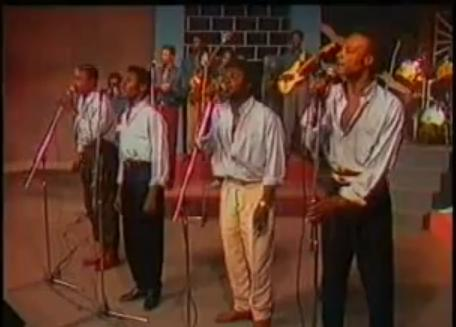
Choc Stars in concert in Kinshasa in 1986

In 1983, he left Grand Zaïko Wawa to join Choc Stars, a band founded by Benoît "Ben" Mutombo Nyamabo. During his time with Choc Stars, Défao performed alongside prominent Congolese artists such as Bozi Boziana, Carlyto Lassa, Debaba, Djuna Djanna, Nzaya Nzayadio, and Monza 1er. Together with guitarist Roxy Tshimpaka ("Grand Niawu") and atalaku Ditutala, the band popularized the Roboti-Robota dance style, which resonated widely across the country. In 1985, Défao contributed several compositions, including "Madjodjo", "Amour du Risque", "Chango", and "Lili-Libandi" under the Paris-based label Équateur. That same year, he also released tracks such as "D.V.", "Lievin", "Gina", and "Santa" under the Afro-Rythmes label, with backing guest vocals by Koffi Olomide. In 1986, he appeared on the Anytha-Ngapy Productions release He Wakatsa 2e Épisode, which included the breakout tracks "Kopalangana Te", "Au Bon Accueil", "Ami Ngapy", and "Farya". Additional works from this period included "Kayisa Nguya" and "Mustapha", also produced by Anytha-Ngapy Productions.

=== 1991–2021: Big Stars ===
In 1991, building on his growing popularity, Défao departed Choc Stars and founded his band, Big Stars, alongside Djo Poster Mumbata, also a former member of Grand Zaïko Wawa. Big Stars served as a launching platform for several emerging Congolese artists, including Montana Kamenga, Kabosé Bulembi, Théo Mbala, as well as musicians such as Serge Kasongo Mboka Liya (aka Burkina Faso), Jagger Bokoko, Lufu Toto "Sénéchal", Djo Djo Bayenge, Trocadero, Azanga, Anthony Sampaïo, Gipson, Bleu Kinanga, Bakolo Keta, Ladji Son, Adoli Bamweniko, Mogus, Guy Wa Nzambi, Richa Cogna Cogna, Sejo, and Kavanda. Throughout the 1990s, Défao experienced a period of unprecedented productivity. He released at least seventeen albums during the decade, six of which were distributed in European markets.

Défao's 1992 release Amour Scolaire achieved significant commercial success, with the title track topping charts in Zaire. In 1995, the album Pitié mon amour garnered particular acclaim in East Africa. His influence was formally recognized when he was voted Congolese Musician of the Year for two consecutive years, 1995 and 1996. Riding the wave of the emerging ndombolo genre, Défao released the album Sala Noki in 1997, which received widespread acclaim. The nine-track album included popular songs such as "Sala Noki", "Sam Samitanga", "Agence Courage", "Maintenance," and "Copinage". In 1998, he followed up with the album Copinage, which included guest vocals by Mbilia Bel. In October of that year, Défao and Big Stars made their debut performance at the Coast Car Park in Mombasa, Kenya. The concert, organized with an ensemble of eleven musicians and five dancers, including lead singer Suke Chule, featured a repertoire of Défao's most popular songs, with the performance of "Nikusema Nakutaka". Following this event, the band went on to perform at City Cabanas Hotel in Nairobi and later at the Lakers Club in Kisumu. That same year, Défao released two additional albums, Général Défao Les Big Stars Et Les 2 Charlots and Tremblement De Terre. The latter included the politically charged track "Mboka Ya Diogen", a veiled critique of then-president Laurent-Désiré Kabila and his administration. Despite this critical stance, Défao also participated that year in Souzy Kasseya's "Tokufa Po Na Congo", a patriotic ensemble piece praising national unity that featured several leading figures in Congolese music under the supergroup Les Plus Grandes Stars, including Wendo Kolosoy, Tabu Ley Rochereau, Jossart N'Yoka Longo, Koffi Olomide, King Kester Emeneya, Werrason, JB Mpiana, Simaro Lutumba, Madilu System, Félix Wazekwa, Tshala Muana, Mbilia Bel, Pépé Kallé, Marie Paul, Pascal Poba, and Manda Chante, among others.

In 1999, Défao maintained a high level of output with the release of three more albums: La Guerre De 100 Ans, Bana Congo Vol. 1: Made in America, and Ambiance Plus: Bana Congo Vol. 2. This period, however, also revealed inconsistencies in career management. Défao frequently changed producers and record labels, at times releasing alternate versions of the same material through different distributors. That year, his career was disrupted when, after arriving in Dar es Salaam, he suffered a severe health crisis caused by malaria and high blood pressure, which prompted the cancellation of several widely anticipated performances, including a headline show on 2 July. The tour had been slated to culminate in the launch of Orchestre Benta Musica, a multinational band, at the Hotel Kilimanjaro, where Défao was expected to serve as guest of honor.

In early 2000s, Big Stars continued to perform across East Africa, where Défao had permanently relocated, but faced recurrent difficulties that hampered their stability. The band grappled with financial constraints, evidenced by repeated disputes over unpaid hotel bills and fines for overstaying in host countries. These problems culminated in several arrests and detentions of Défao himself, alongside immigration violations involving numerous band members. Despite maintaining a visible presence through performances in Zambia, Uganda, Kenya, Tanzania, and Zimbabwe, the band's activities were frequently overshadowed by organizational and management challenges. By 2006, Défao had shifted his focus to a new 16-member outfit, Kisanula, with which he toured internationally. Big Stars was later revived in the early 2010s.

== Solo career ==
=== 2000–2021: Piracy, releases, detention, and performances ===
In 2000, Défao signed with JPS Productions, a Paris-based label founded by Cameroonian producer Jean Pierre Saah. He subsequently recorded the solo album Nessy De London with a lineup of accomplished session musicians, including Nyboma, Wuta Mayi, Luciana De Mingongo, Dally Kimoko, 3615 Code Niawu, Ballou Canta, Deesse Mukangi, and Djudjuchet Luvengoka. Before the official launch on 4 September, reports surfaced that pirated copies were already circulating in Tanzania. According to the Tanzania Music Copyright Association (TMCA), Congolese artists had filed complaints against Tanzanian producers and wholesalers accused of unauthorized reproduction and distribution. Défao had previously condemned such practices in 1999, when pirated cassettes of his songs were sold in Dar es Salaam before their official release. After encountering bootlegged versions of Nessy De London on the streets, he was reportedly moved to tears before his entourage, later organizing a press conference to denounce the piracy and express frustration that his Tanzanian visit, intended for the album's official launch, had been undermined.

Following Nessy De London's release, Défao's public visibility declined. Reports emerged suggesting he had become entangled in a political dispute, leading to a performance ban imposed by then-President Laurent-Désiré Kabila. Défao relocated to East Africa, where he faced a number of difficulties, including financial instability and immigration issues. In late 2001, over Big Stars' twenty members were detained by Tanzanian immigration authorities for overstaying their residence permits. While Défao himself had extended his permit until January 2002, thus avoiding penalty, his colleagues were fined approximately $200 each, amounting to a total of $4,200. The band had entered Tanzania in August 2001 for a performance tour but encountered significant hardships, with local promoters allegedly failing to meet contractual obligations for accommodation and expenses. The arrests occurred in the border town of Namanga as the band attempted to cross into Kenya. The Congolese ambassador to Tanzania, Théodore Mugalu, publicly criticized the promoters, holding them responsible for abandoning the musicians. They were ultimately expelled for failing to pay their fines, with immigration officials noting they had "little or no chance of raising the money".

After several years of limited activity, Défao returned to the stage in September 2006 with a new 16-member band named Kisanula, accompanied by dancers. Organized by international promoter Jules Nsana, the comeback tour was intended to promote his forthcoming album Nzombo le Soir, with concerts scheduled in Kampala and California. Another extended absence followed the release of Nzombo le Soir later that year, lasting until the 2010 release of Pur Encore, a digital-only album that was criticized for poor audio quality. Despite these criticisms, Robert Kalumba of the Daily Monitor observed that several tracks from Pur Encore were well received in performance, attributing their positive reception in part to the use of a strong sound system.

In 2011, he began preparing a more ambitious return with the album The Undertaker Vol. 1. The project was produced over an extended period to ensure high production standards and was released by Éditions Kaluila. Accompanied by music videos filmed across Africa and Europe, The Undertaker Vol. 1 was praised as a major comeback and reaffirmed Défao's place in Congolese music. In 2016, he released Any Time, produced by Djeffar Awatoza Productions, which featured collaborations with prominent Kinshasa and Brazzaville-based artists, including Roga Roga, Sam Tshintu, Manda Chante, and long-time associate Godessy Lofombo. In August 2019, following a 21-year absence from the Congolese capital and the end of Joseph Kabila's presidency, Défao returned to Kinshasa under the administration of President Félix Tshisekedi. He reconstituted Big Stars with former members such as Montana Kamenga and Azanga, and together they recorded what would become his final album, Bety Poni.

== Death ==
While on tour in West Africa, Défao died on 27 December 2021 at Laquintinie Hospital in Douala, Cameroon. He had been in the country for rehearsals ahead of a New Year's Eve concert when he became unwell. Though officially confirmed to have died from COVID-19, reports indicated that underlying health issues, including diabetes, may have contributed to his death. His final album, Bety Poni, was released posthumously on the same day.

Following his death, arrangements were made by the Congolese Minister of Culture, Arts and Heritage, Catherine Katumbu Furaha, in agreement with his family, to repatriate his body to Kinshasa for funeral services. Initially expected on 4 January 2022, the body arrived in Kinshasa on 12 January. In discussions with Catherine Furaha, Défao's family expressed their desire for him to be buried on 23 January in Kisantu, Kongo Central, a choice opposed by fellow artists who preferred a burial at the Nécropole Entre ciel et terre cemetery in Nsele, Kinshasa. Pending an agreement, his body was held at the Cinquantenaire Hospital morgue in Kasa-Vubu, Kinshasa. On 19 January, Catherine Furaha announced that the burial would take place at the Nécropole Entre ciel et terre on 22 January. A wake without the body was held on 21 January at the Grâce hall on Victoire Avenue in Kalamu, Kinshasa, organized by his biological and artistic families. On 22 January, the body was moved from the morgue for a requiem ceremony at the National Museum of the Democratic Republic of the Congo, allowing the public to pay final respects before the burial.

== Legal issues ==
=== 2002 hotel debt case ===
In early 2002, Défao was arrested in Nairobi by officers of the Criminal Investigation Department (CID). The management of the Palacina Residential Hotel accused him of defaulting on a cumulative debt of KSh 594,400 for services incurred between October 2001 and March 2002. Police reports indicated that a friend had attempted to settle the matter with a counterfeit Mastercard, which heightened concerns and delayed bail. Défao's Kenyan promoter, identified as Mr. Njoroge, publicly dissociated himself from the affair, asserting that the artist had been living in the country on his own accord.

At the Kibera Law Courts, Défao's legal team, led by lawyers Cecil Miller and Cliff Ombeta, argued that detaining him threatened the Big Stars' livelihoods and jeopardized four scheduled concerts in Eldoret, Nakuru, Mombasa, and Kisumu. They also emphasized his fragile health, presenting documentation that he suffered from diabetes and high blood pressure. Prosecutor Chief Inspector William Kemboi, however, pressed for remand, warning that Défao posed a flight risk if released. On 19 March 2002, Senior Principal Magistrate Wanjiru Karanja granted Défao bail under stringent conditions, setting it at KSh 200,000 with two Kenyan sureties of equal value and requiring him to deposit his passport with the court. Although freed in principle, Défao was unable to immediately secure the sureties and remained in custody at Nairobi's Industrial Area Prison. Although the trial was initially slated to begin on 10 April, negotiations between Défao's defense and the hotel management began in an effort to reach an out-of-court settlement. On 27 May, Miller informed the court that discussions with the Palacina Hotel were progressing and requested additional time. The hotel's general manager, Macksoud A. Macksoud, confirmed the negotiations but noted that the outstanding debt had yet to be paid. Ultimately, the criminal proceedings were terminated following an application by the prosecutor, Chief Inspector Kemboi. However, the matter was transferred into a civil suit filed by the Palacina Hotel at the Milimani Commercial Courts. The hotel's assistant general manager, Cynthia Wanjiru Edith, testified that Défao had failed to make meaningful efforts to settle the debt, prompting management to pursue the matter through civil litigation. Défao's counsel did not contest the transfer of the case to civil jurisdiction.

=== 2003 immigration fine ===
In October 2003, Défao was scheduled to perform at the Harare International Conference Center in Zimbabwe, but failed to appear. Press reports stated that Kenyan authorities had detained him in Mombasa over unsettled debts, including an unpaid hotel bill of $500 and an immigration fine of $10,000 for overstaying his residence permit. He was reportedly arrested at Jomo Kenyatta International Airport while attempting to board a flight to Zimbabwe. Big Stars members alleged that his financial mismanagement and extravagant lifestyle had contributed to the debt. Zimbabwean promoter Reginald Chapfunga later confirmed that a company official was dispatched to Mombasa to clear the arrears, after which Défao arrived in Harare on 23 October and rescheduled performances in Harare and Bulawayo.

=== 2004 deportation and Big Stars' immigration violations ===
In January 2004, Défao was deported from Zimbabwe after authorities determined that his temporary work permit had expired. Later that year, in July, the Zimbabwean Department of Immigration launched an investigation into 19 Congolese musicians associated with Big Stars who were alleged to be residing in the country illegally and performing without authorization. Officials reported that several musicians had been located in Harare suburbs, including Malanda Vuku, Njunta Biwamposa, Akilemba Delwa, Umba Mananga, and Tsiyoyo Muteba. Authorities also stated that, following Défao's deportation, the Big Stars' remaining members had not returned to the DRC as pledged by the Congolese embassy in Harare.

Immigration officials also suggested that the pattern raised broader concerns regarding possible human trafficking, alleging that some African musicians may have been using band permits to facilitate extended unauthorized stays for accompanying performers. While existing Zimbabwean law placed no restrictions on the number of band members allowed entry, officials announced that measures were being considered to address the problem of overstaying permits. Reports indicated that some of Défao's musicians continued to reside in Harare neighborhoods such as the Avenues, Cranborne, and Hatfield.

=== 2009 immigration dispute ===
In June 2009, Défao encountered immigration difficulties in Zimbabwe when his temporary work permit expired at midnight on 3 June, despite being scheduled to perform a series of benefit concerts across the country. Principal Immigration Officer Evans Siziba declared his stay unlawful and announced that deportation proceedings were underway. Promoter Karen Madhake of Venus Promotions disputed the assertion, citing a 22 May 2009 ruling by Harare Magistrates' Civil Court judge Stanley Chimedza, which had determined that Défao was "not a prohibited person" and thus entitled to the same treatment as any other lawful visitor. Despite this judicial ruling, immigration officials maintained that his presence remained irregular. On 9 June, Siziba confirmed that Défao had not exited through any official channels, contradicting assurances from promoters that his departure was imminent. Madhake reiterated that the case was under review by the Ministry of Home Affairs, which was evaluating his appeal under provisions of the Immigration Act.

The matter was settled on 11 June 2009, when Défao departed Zimbabwe aboard a Kenya Airways flight. Authorities clarified that his departure had been necessitated by the expiration of his work permit but affirmed that he remained eligible to reapply should he wish to return.

== Personal life ==
=== Relationships ===
Despite being involved in several relationships, Défao never married and left no widow or children at the time of his death. Although some reports suggested that he may have cohabited with a Kenyan partner, close associates indicated that he was not known to have had a wife or children. Themes of family and parenthood, however, appeared in his music. In "Georgina", from the 1995 album Pitié mon amour, he assumed the role of a father advising his daughter to pursue education, citing her brother Fabrice as a model of responsibility toward parents. Défao also remarked that he invested his earnings into his "children", rather than the nightlife or flamboyant displays associated with La Sape. While speculation regarding biological children persisted, Défao repeatedly emphasized that his true legacy rested in his music and performance.

=== Dispute with Laurent-Désiré Kabila and exile allegations ===
In 1998, Défao released the album Tremblement de Terre, which included the track "Mboka Ya Diogen", a veiled critique of President Laurent-Désiré Kabila. In the song, he alluded to Kabila's past as his former chauffeur in Tanzania. Soon after, Défao embarked on a tour of Zambia with Big Stars, but when his visa expired, Zambian authorities alerted Kinshasa. Fearing deportation, he fled rather than return to Congo, a decision that surprised even his promoter, Kayembe Kalondji. His subsequent travels took him through Tanzania, where he was arrested in January 2002 for attempting to cross into Kenya without proper documents.

Although his encounters with immigration officials were often humiliating, Défao denied claims that he was a fugitive or in political exile. In an interview with the Standard, he described Kabila as a former close friend and dismissed rumors of political persecution, stating "I don't know where this is coming from. Laurent Kabila was once a very close friend, and we shared a lot in common. It is normal for people to disagree, and I don't see why mine should be treated as a big deal". He stressed that he was not blacklisted in Congo: "We all have freedom of choice. I am not banned in Congo, which is why I sometimes perform in certain areas, except for Kinshasa. The reason is simple—I want my Kinshasa concert to be a grand affair, because the city is the true center of entertainment". To many observers, these statements suggested that Défao avoided Kinshasa not out of choice, but because Kabila's loyalists would not allow him to perform freely. Instead, he held smaller shows in remote venues where he could evade political interference. This perception shifted under the presidency of Félix Tshisekedi, when Défao resumed contact with government authorities and eventually returned to Kinshasa before Kabila officially retired from politics.

=== Skin bleaching ===
In 2015, Défao's appearance became the subject of widespread public and media attention following an event at Egesa East Villa in Umoja, Nairobi, where he was seen alongside renowned dancer and singer Kanda King. Observers noted a dramatic change in the singer's physical appearance, particularly in his complexion and weight. Known previously for his fuller figure, Défao appeared noticeably slimmer and significantly lighter in skin tone. Citizen TV remarked on the crowd's astonishment at seeing a visibly "whiter" Défao, while Pulse Kenya's Susan Watiri described his look as "Casper-like", accentuated by makeup that produced a stark white cast in photographs due to flashback effects.

Initially silent on the matter, Défao addressed the controversy in a 2017 interview with Metropolitan, explaining that the lightening of his skin was not intentional. He attributed the change to the use of a prescription cream clobetasol propionate, which he had reportedly been applying to treat a chronic dermatological condition. Clobetasol propionate is a potent topical corticosteroid typically used to manage severe skin disorders such as psoriasis, eczema, lichen planus, and discoid lupus erythematosus (DLE), an autoimmune-related condition. Despite claims that the lightening effect was medically induced, Défao did not distance himself from the broader cultural practice of skin bleaching. He publicly defended its use, citing personal and cultural reasons. He framed it as part of his identity as a sapeur, a member of the Congolese subculture known for its emphasis on elegance, fashion, and self-presentation. According to Défao, in Congolese society, skin bleaching is often viewed as a symbol of refinement and elevated social status. In a conversation with a close associate ahead of his final concert in Kampala in 2016, he reportedly stated: "Every Congolese man worth his name who aspires to be admired has to bleach".

== Selected discography ==
Défao's complete discography is unknown, as many of his albums were not sold internationally.

Selected discography
Title	Year	Label	Remarks
Défao dans Santa	1985	Afro-Rythmes	LP - with Chocs Stars and Koffi Olomide
Défao A Paris	1985	Equateur	LP - with Choc Stars
Le Duo Choc A Paris Vol.1	1985	Anytha-Ngapy Productions	LP - with Carlyto Lassa
He Wakatsa 2e Episode	1986	Anytha-Ngapy Productions	LP - with Carlyto Lassa and Debaba
Defao de Choc Stars (often referred as Chagrin Dimone)	1988	Editions Kaluila	LP - with Choc Stars
Niki et José	1988	Sacodisc International	LP
Bel Ami Wolo	1988	Bisel	LP - with Debaba and Sedjo Kha
La Force Tranquille	1989	Scorpion Productions Clesh Atipo	LP
Aimé la Congolaise	1989	Rythmes Et Musique	LP - with Papa Wemba
Debaba, Défao Et Sejo Kha	1990	Bisel	LP - with Debaba and Sedjo Kha
Défao Et Son Groupe (often referred as Hitachi)	1990	Anytha-Ngapy Productions	LP
Big - Stars Du Général Défao	1992	SonoDisc	LP - with Big Stars
Amour - Scolaire	1992	SonoDisc	LP - with Big Stars
Djem's	1992	SonoDisc	CD - with Big Stars
Défao Et Les Bigs Stars	1993	Editions Kaluila	LP - with Big Stars
Système D	1993	A.P.L. Diffusion	CD - with Big Stars
La Saga de Défao	1993	Flash Diffusion Business	CD reissue of Chagrin Dimone and La Force Tranquille
Africa Richesse	1994	Editions Kaluila	With Big Stars
Donat	1994	Flash Diffusion Business	CD and DVD - with Big Stars
Apo/Didi Kikuta	1994	Flash Diffusion Business	With Big Stars
Pitié mon amour	1995	Maillot-Jaune	With Big Stars
Alvaro	1995	Déclic Communication	With Big Stars
Benson (also titled Otoki Te Okozua Mosolo Te)	1995	Tonton-Jacques	With Big Stars
Dernier Album 95	1995	Antabel Production	With Big Stars
Famille Kikuta	1996	Defao Production	Reissue of Pitié mon amour (1995)
Amour Interdit	1996	Scorpion Productions Clesh Atipo	With Big Stars
Fan Fan dans Phily Mbala	1996	Scorpion Productions Clesh Atipo	With Big Stars
Sala Noki	1997	Ets Ndiaye	Album Benson + 2 tracks
Copinage	1998	Ets Ndiaye	With Big Stars
Général Défao Les Bigs Stars Et Les 2 Charlots	1998	Mic'Son Music	With Big Stars
Tremblement De Terre	1998	Simon Music S.I.P.E.	With Big Stars
La Guerre De 100 Ans	1999	Simon Music S.I.P.E.	With Big Stars
Bana Congo vol.1 Made in America	1999	Roma Productions	
Ambiance Plus: Bana Congo vol.2	1999	Roma Productions	
Nessy De London	2000	JPS Production	
Nzombo le Soir	2006	Roma Productions	
Anthologie Défao	2008	Production Babi Editions	
Pur encore	2010	Sound Africa	
The Undertaker Vol. 1	2011	Editions Kaluila	
Any Time	2016	Djeffar Awatoza Productions	
Bety Poni	2021	Anytha-Ngapy Productions	Posthumous release
