= Daddy Dikambala =

Congolese actor (1970-2020)

- Born: Alidor Tuiler; 23 January 1970; Kinshasa, Democratic Republic of Congo
- Died: 11 February 2020 (aged 50); Kinshasa, Democratic Republic of Congo
- Occupation: Actor
- Notable work: Makila Mabé (1996)
- Children: 8
- Parents: Francois Dikambala (father); Nkosi Matula (mother)

Alidor Tuiler, professionally known as Daddy Dikambala (23 January 1970 - 11 February 2020) was a Congolese actor. Identified as a prominent member of the Chic Choc Loyenge group led by the comedian Ngagiada Ngadios, Dikambala has emerged as a significant figure in Congolese theatre. He played a vital role in the revival of Congolese dramatic art during the 1990s and 2000s.

== Early life ==
Dikambala was born on January 23, 1970, in the Kasa-vubu commune of Kinshasa, in the Democratic Republic of Congo. He is the third of six children in his family and is the son of Francois Dikambala and Nkosi Matula. He completed his education at the Bobokoli Champagnar Institute.

== Career ==
Dikambala's acting career developed within the ensemble known as “Swabala,” alongside Siatula and Mbata Siala, whose performances captivated the Congolese audience during the era of “Nzonzing,” produced by Diego Musique. He made a significant impact following actors such as Esobe and Saïsaï. Just prior to his death, he established his own group, Tapis Rouge.

== Personal life ==
Dikambala fathered eight children with three different women. With the late Tyty Lusanda, he had two children, Daty and Julia Dikambala.

He then married Gisèle Ketaketa, an artist and actress, with whom he had four children: Alidor, Tegra, Stéphanie, and Messi Dikambala. In a free union with Annie Ntumba, also an artist and actress, he welcomed two more children: Olivier and Ramy Dikambala. Additionally, Dikambala was involved in another relationship with Charly Yissi.

== Death ==
Dikambala died on Tuesday, February 11, 2020, at the Ngaliema Clinic in the commune of Gombe after a battle with stomach cancer.

=== Personal tributes ===
Actor Fiston SaïSaï shared on his Facebook page, "Rest in peace big brother Daddy Dikambala red carpet" Meanwhile, actor Caleb Tukebana conveyed his sorrow on his Facebook account, stating, "It is with tears in my eyes that I have just learned the sad news of the passing of the artist Daddy Dikambala Tsudu Kitomina red carpet! Peace to your soul dear friend and brother".

== See also ==
- Bellevue Kandy
- Jackie Shako Diala Anahengo
