= Kazumba =

Kazumba may refer to:

- Kazumba, Kasai-Occidental, a settlement in Kasai-Occidental province of the Democratic Republic of the Congo
- Kazumba Territory, a territory in Kasai-Occidental province of the Democratic Republic of the Congo
