= Ursule Peshanga =

Congolese actress (born 1980)

- Born: Ursule Peshanga Mikobi; 5 August 1980 (age 46); Kinshasa, Democratic Republic of Congo
- Other names: Mupesha, Black panther
- Education: Makelele institute
- Occupations: Actress, Producer
- Years active: 1998-present
- Notable work: Ursule against Peshanga
- Parents: Gilbert Mikobi (father); Mbuyi Godelive (mother)
- Awards: Best Actress of the Decade at Congo Awards, Female Influence and Cultural Impact Award

Ursule Peshanga Mikobi (born 5 August 1980), commonly referred to as Ursule Peshanga, is a Congolese actress, producer, and entrepreneur.

== Early life ==
Ursule Peshanga was born on August 5, 1980, in Kinshasa, Democratic Republic of Congo. She is the eldest of six siblings, with her father being a sculptor. Her parents aspired for her to pursue a career in nursing. Ursule pursued her education at the Makélélé Institute, where she earned a degree in biology and chemistry.

Following the completion of her baccalaureate, Ursule successfully persuaded her parents to support her ambition to enter the film industry, with the condition that she would continue her education. As a result, Ursule enrolled in university; however, the demands of rehearsals and filming made it challenging for her to maintain her studies. Consequently, she decided to focus entirely on her career in cinema.

== Career ==
Ursule lived next door to the comedian Yandi Mosi, a member of the "Simba" group in the Bandalungwa commune. Yandi suggested that Ursule join the training sessions for the Simba group, which is led by President Elombe Sukari. Initially, she declined the offer, but eventually, she agreed to participate. She started her professional journey with the Simba group, under the leadership of President Elombe Sukari. Her outstanding performances garnered significant public interest. She made her debut to a wider audience in the television series Doctor or Teacher, portraying the role of a nurse.

Ursule featured in films including "Techno Malewa," "Nkokoso," "Sima Ekoli," "Ikia," and "Locataire Kolopango." These productions not only achieved commercial success but also established Ursule as one of the emerging talents in Congolese cinema. Ursule embarked on her journey in solo film production in 2010. Her notable works include "Bolingi Bololo," "Ursule contre Peshanga," "La Fille de son père," which received a nomination for the 2019 HapAward, and "Kianda," nominated for the M'y Rode Festival.

Ursule officially became a member of the International Federation of Nigerian Actors in April 2023. She made her film debut alongside two prominent figures in Nigerian cinema, Walter Anga and Ebube Obio. She appeared in several films produced by Nollywood, Nigeria's vibrant film industry. Ursule has received her membership card, with her contract scheduled to conclude in December 2024. Ursule joined a distinguished roster of renowned actors from Nigeria and Ghana, including Ramsey Nouah, Jim Ikye, Van Vicker, Desmond Elliot, Yul Edochie, Ini Edo, Mercy Johnson, Oge Okoye, Ruth Kadiri, and Regina Daniels.

Ursule featured in Fally Ipupa's music video for "MH," which is part of his 2022 album "Formula 7," alongside Ronsia Kukel. Ursule received an invitation to perform alongside Fally Ipupa at his concert, which took place on November 25, 2024, at the U-Arena in Nanterre, France.

== Personal life ==
Ursule established her label, "LBL," with the goal of nurturing and promoting emerging talents and various groups. Ursule shares a close friendship with Congolese actress Bellevue Kandy.
