= L'Or Mbongo =

Congolese gospel singer-songwriter and anti-mine ambassador

- Also known as: L'Or Mbongo Lemba, L'Or Mbongo–Lemba
- Born: L'Or Mbongo; July 6, 1978 (age 48); Kinshasa, Democratic Republic of Congo
- Origin: Kinshasa, Democratic Republic of Congo
- Genres: Gospel music; Christian music
- Occupations: Singer-songwriter, cantor,
- Instrument: Vocals
- Years active: 2000–present
- Labels: Gospel Records, Management Plus International, Papy Zola Production, JMK Productions, Sun World Music, K2A MUSIC
Personal information
- Citizenship: Democratic Republic of the Congo
- Education: University of Kinshasa

L'Or Lemba-Mbongo (née L'Or Mbongo, a.k.a. L'Or Mbongo-Lemba) is a Congolese singer-songwriter and cantor living in Kinshasa. She had made 7 albums during the course from 2003 to 2019.

== Early life ==
L'Or Mbongo was born in the Matété commune of then Zaire, Kinshasa on 6 July 1978. Some sources state that L'Or Mbongo was born in Matadi or Kisenso, but she originally came from Matété. She had said multiple times during interviews that her early life was hard and tough. She lived with her stepmother who was housed in a shack and was treated worse than the rest of her brother and sisters. This would help her late compose many songs, including her debut album.

== Career ==
After graduating the Lycée Sainte Germaine de N'djili in the Commercial and Administration in 1997, Mbongo went to enroll at the University of Kinshasa. Financial issues forced her to discontinue her studies. 2 years later, in 1999, Mbongo met Christian Lemba while she was singing in the church choir. She was among the singers of her school to enhance cultural and other events. Lemba was the keyboard player of the group. They later entered in a relationship and got married in 1999/2000.

They both had maintained their relationship with God and composed many songs through the years. Over time, Mbongo had looked up to many other singers, including Lili Sumbela, Denis Ngonde, Kanguma, and the Gaël music group. Mbongo had to confine in God in prayer before she could go and perform in her husband's band. According to her, it took a sign from God to realize that she could go into music without any fear. During this time, she was singing with other noted musicians, such as the noted gospel singer Charles Mombaya and Solange Banza in Do Unzibudila.

After she realized, L'Or Mbongo joined her husband's Christian gospel band, La Mano Di Dio. The group contributed to the visibility of Mbongo in the Democratic Republic of the Congo. This also helped Mbongo make her first album, titled Tina Te Eza Na Tina which in Lingala literally means "Something without value has value".

Mbongo released 3 more official albums in that decade, which includes Nsimbulu, Mariage des Pèlerins, and Yesu Kaka. Mbongo's most recent album, Ma Robe de Glorie (which literally means "My dress of glory") was released in 2019. She was also featured and many albums, including Henri-Papa Mulaja's digital release of Merci Seigneur pour 2020 with Fiston Mbuyi, Lord Lombo, Jonathan Munghongwa, Patient Munghongwa and Cassi Kalala. Mbongo was also featured in Junior Kadia's Bonne semence, Vol. 1 in the song Kumisa Yahweh with Sandra Mbuyi, Anny Nsinga, the Kunda sisters, Moïse Matuta, and Papy Boofe.

Although largely known for being a singer, Mbongo is also the United Nations Anti-Mine Ambassador for the Democratic Republic of the Congo. She was appointed on 4 April 2009. Mbongo's main goal was to stop mines across the DRC's soil was littered with detonated explosives from the Second Congo War. When asked about the detonated bombs, she said:

The person who contacted us was happy to see that the Ambassador did something. With the plea in any case, God willing, the Bas-Congo will also see us in this context. We will organize the awareness sessions.

L'Or Mbongo had also been helping with charity and people in orphanages. She also is building a health center in Maluku, a commune in Kinshasa.

== Personal life ==
L'Or Mbongo is a mother of five and married Christian Lemba in 2000.

== Discography ==
7 albums with her debut album being the "Tina Te Eza Na Tina" in 2002. She had been featured on multiple occasions.

=== Albums ===
- Tina Te Eza Na Tina (2002) [CD, DVD, VHS]
- Nsimbulu (2004) [CD, DVD, VHS]
- Mariage des Pèlerins (2006) [CD+DVD]
- Yesu Kaka (2007) [CD+DVD]
- Scusa (2010) [CD+DVD]
- Oracle de l'Éternel (2014) [CD+DVD]
- Ma Robe de Gloire (2019) [CD]

=== Live albums ===
- 2004: Live O2 Brixton Academy
- 2005: Live au Coeur de L’Europe

=== Featured in ===
- 2000: Do Unzibudila by Charles Mombaya
- 2002: Kumisa Yahwe by Nouvelle Semence with Junior Kadia
- 2018: Yesu Elonga na Ngai with Immaculée Omandji
- 2018: Bonne semence, Vol. 1 with Junior Kadia
- 2019: Bendele with Immortel Kaniki
- 2020: Merci Seigneur pour 2020 with Henri Papa Mulaja
- 2021: Adorarei with Francisco Doceta
