= Lema Kusa =

- Born: 24 July 1944 (age 81); Kingenge, Bas-Zaire, Democratic Republic of the Congo
- Occupation: Painter

Lema Kusa (born 24 July 1944) is a graphic artist and painter from the Democratic Republic of the Congo.

== Birth and education ==
Lema Kusa was born on 24 July 1944 in Kinkenge in Bas-Congo. He was educated at the Protestant school of pastors and teachers in Kimpese. In 1958 he entered the Academy of Fine Arts in present-day Kinshasa to study advertising painting and illustrations. After seven years he was awarded a diploma and a scholarship to study graphic arts at the Saint-Luc Higher Institute of Fine Arts in Liège, Belgium. He also took courses at the Liege Graduate School of Business and was a visiting student at the University of Louvain's Institute of Political and Social Science. He then completed his professional development through work in the University of Louvain External Relations department, the Inter Marco Publicem and Publisynthèse advertising agencies in Brussels, and the printers Mambourg in Liege, Acobel in Brussels and Agfa-Gevaert in Mortsel.

== Career ==
As soon as he returned to Zaire, Lema Kusa took the position of professor and head of advertising of the newly formed Academy of Fine Arts (l'Académie des Beaux-Arts). At the same time he became head of the drawing studio for the leading advertising agency in Congo, then in 1974 launched his own agency, "Design Promotion". From 1981 he was deputy section chief in charge of teaching at the Academy of Fine Arts. He also became CEO of the National Institute of Arts, Kinshasa, a position he was holding in 2008 while also a professor at the Academy of Fine Arts.

== Work ==
In his spare time from his different jobs Lema Kusa created strong and moral paintings. He painted drunks, prostitutes, market figures, beggars and idlers with a strong expressionist palette and a distinctive and subtle humor. His paintings are often symbolic and sometimes abstract. Although highly original, his paintings always show the desire to please the public derived from his training in advertising. He has said of his paintings of women that if God created woman last, he must then have found perfection. He paints women as happy, beautiful and opulent, with their beauty providing a doorway for entering into the mystery of creation.

His work has been shown at numerous exhibitions including the Third Extraordinary Congress of the International Association of Art Critics at Kinshasa N'Sele (1973), exhibition of avant-garde painters in Paris (1975), Festival of Basel (1978) and solo exhibitions in New York and Atlanta (1980). He participated in the National Symposium on Authenticity in September 1981 at N'Sele held by the Writers' Union of Zaire. He is a member of the National Association of Artists in Fine Arts and an associate member of AICA / Zaire.
