= Kane Keid =

South African rapper

- Born: Lonwabo Nkhoesa; August 22, 2003 (age 23); Thembisa, Johannesburg, Gauteng, South Africa
- Origin: Johannesburg, Gauteng, South Africa
- Genre: Hip hop
- Occupations: Rapper; Songwriter
- Years active: 2023–present

Lonwabo Nkhoesa (born 22 August 2003), known professionally as Kane Keid, is a South African rapper and songwriter from Thembisa, Gauteng. He is noted for his introspective lyrics, storytelling ability, and for garnering early endorsement from international hip-hop figures.

== Early life ==
Lonwabo Nkhoesa was born and raised in Thembisa, a township north of Johannesburg, Gauteng. He discovered Hip-Hop in his early teens and began writing his own lyrics at age 15. He taught himself basic recording techniques using home software and shared early freestyles on social media, and original songs, gradually building a local following.

== Career ==
=== Breakthrough ===
Kane Keid initially attracted attention online through a series of raw, self-produced freestyle videos. In mid-2023, Kane Keid finished in the Top 10 of the Sportscene “Put Me On” competition, a nationwide showcase for emerging South African rappers, which amplified his profile within the local Hip-Hop community. Later that year, short freestyle videos he posted online caught the attention of established artists; a notable incident involved fellow rapper A-Reece unfollowing him after a podcast discussion, which itself generated significant press and further elevated his name recognition. Clips of his performances caught the eye of prominent artists and producers—most notably Will.i.am, Timbaland and Pusha T—who publicly reacted to his work on social media in late 2024.

=== Debut EP and subsequent releases ===
In November 2023, Kane Keid released his first project Dollar (A Kid's Analogy). He released his debut nine-track EP Not Famous on 30 April 2025. The EP was praised by GQ South Africa as “gritty, honest” and “cutting through the noise,” exploring themes of ambition and identity. Lead single “Trouble Again” (feat. Usimamane) was released 3 April 2025, accompanied by an official music video on YouTube; the track showcases his signature blend of melodic hooks and reflective bars.

=== Collaborations and features ===
Kane Keid has been featured on and contributed to numerous collaborative projects:

- “Make It Right” by Lucasraps (2024)
- “Skuta Baba (Remix)” alongside Buzzi Lee, Cassper Nyovest, Kwesta, et al.
- “AURA” (feat. 808 Sallie & Kali Freshman)
- “Blessed” with Baby Daiz (2025)

=== Tours and live performances ===
In late 2024, Kane Keid joined the Joburg leg of Nasty C’s Ivyson Tour, performing alongside top-tier South African acts and gaining experience on large stages. In May 2025, he performed a live rendition of “Trouble Again” on the Swisher Show, which was shared across social media platforms.

== Artistry and influences ==
Critics note that Kane Keid’s style blends first-person narratives with broader social commentary, often drawing on personal experiences in Thembisa. He cites influences ranging from South African pioneers like Kwesta to global storytellers such as J. Cole and Kendrick Lamar.

== Awards ==
Sportscene Put Me On – Top 10 finalist (2023)

== Discography ==
- Dollar (A Kid's Analogy) [Mixtape] 2023
- Not Famous (Black Boy Fly) [Single] 2024
- WAR (ft Priddy Ugly & Tyson Sabateli) [Single] 2024
- GOAT TALK 2024 [Single]
- Skuta Baba Remix [Single] 2024
- Not Famous [EP] 2025
- Call U Back When I Make It [Mixtape] 2025
- Lost Myself - Kelvin Momo [Single] 2025
