= Mystère du Voile, vol. 1 =

Studio album by Marie Misamu
- Released: 2005
- Studio: Studio Asifiwe
- Genre: Gospel
- Length: 54:30
- Languages: French; Lingala
- Label: Sardonyx Productions
- Producer: Magloire Sardonyx

Marie Misamu chronology
Béatitudes (Est-ce que ?) (2003)	Mystère du Voile, vol. 1 (2005)	Mystère du Voile, vol. 2 (2007)

Mystère du Voile, vol. 1 (English: Mystery of the Veil) is the fifth studio album released by Congolese gospel artist Marie Misamu, released by Sardonyx Production in 2005.

The album received "Best Album of the Year" in 2005 with the Mwana Mboka Trophy, a prestigious award for gospel artist in the Democratic Republic of the Congo. She also won "Best Singer of the Year".

== Track listing ==
All lyrics are written by Marie Misamu.

No.	Title	Length
1.	"Eh Yahweh" (featuring Mike Kalambay)	7:25
2.	"Oza Wapi ?" (featuring José Nzita)	4:39
3.	"Kumama" (featuring José Nzita)	5:00
4.	"Les Cieux" (featuring Eva Mbikayi & Sandra Mbuyi)	6:20
5.	"Bouc Émissaire"	4:54
6.	"Reconnaissance"	5:29
7.	"Mokeli na Ngai"	14:20
8.	"Ayo Ayo"	1:10
9.	"Bilaka"	6:33
Total length:		54:30

== Personnel ==
=== Instruments ===
- Marie Misamu – arrangements, writer, vocals, background vocals
- David Sanga – vocals, background vocals
- Papy Mecharck – vocals, background vocals
- Mike Kalambay – vocals
- Eva Mbikayi – vocals
- José Nzita – vocals
- Christian Litasi – acoustic guitar
- Dolly Ndombasi – acoustic guitar
- Patou Masodi – bass guitar
- Jina Ngeleke – background vocals
- Patou Masodi – bass guitar
- Jean-Luc Dokolo – drums
- Noël Musipesi – percussion

=== Production ===
- Magloire Sardonyx – producer
- Christian Litasi – engineering
- Justin Bukasa – engineering
- Hervé Nzambe – synthesizer
- Simplice Diabakana – synthesizer

== Release history ==
Region	Date	Edition(s)	Format(s)	Label(s)
Democratic Republic of the Congo	19 September 2005	Standard	CD; DVD	Sardonyx Production
France	19 September 2005	Standard	CD; DVD	Sardonyx Production

== Awards and nominations ==
Year	Event	Prize	Result	Ref.
2005	Trophée Mwana Mboka	Best Album of the Year	Won	
