= Marie Misamu =

Congolese singer and composer (1974–2016)

- Born: Marie Misamu Ngolo Ndombasi; November 16, 1974; Kinshasa, Democratic Republic of the Congo
- Died: January 16, 2016 (aged 41) Kinshasa, Democratic Republic of the Congo
- Genres: Gospel; Congolese rumba
- Occupations: Singer; songwriter
- Instrument: Vocals
- Years active: 1996–2016
- Labels: Kin-Express Productions; Bajak Biongo; Maison Bethesda; Vase d'Or Production; Sardonyx Production; Foundation Lisalisi; Baby Kwayo Production; Maison Emmathis Production

Marie Misamu (16 November 1974 – 16 January 2016), whose real name is Marie Misamu Ngolo Ndombasi, was a cantor, Congolese composer born November 16, 1974, in Kinshasa and died January 16, 2016, still in the same place.

== Early life ==
Marie Misamu comes from a family of eight children, with her father being Gerard Ngolo Ndombasi and mother being Sophie Balekita. She starts singing at the age of 11. After school, her friends gather around her to listen to her sing. She will then develop the gospel style alongside Evangelist Debaba. She participates in the album of the brother Del (Musamaliya) then with Debaba himself and she releases the album Nazhirea, Who's that girl ?. In this album, is the song "Reconnaissance" that Marie Misamu known to the public of the DRC, Congo-Brazzaville and other countries. She married at the age of 19 and gave birth to her daughter Ruth in May 1994. It is with this album, Nazhirea, Who's that girl ? Marie Misamu begins to make a name and knows the success. Her voice, her repertoire, her style, her multiform talent make her known far beyond the borders of the Congo. The historian Sébastien Fath sees her as "a great pioneer of this new history of African Gospel that will one day write". In early 2016, she announces her retirement and her feeling of insecurity on BestAfrica Radio broadcast on B-One TV. She dies on January 16, 2016, of a cardiac malaise. In addition to music, she was a stylist, model maker, seamstress and decorator. With her talents, she participates in a film where she is in a relationship with Felix Wazekwa. Following his death comes the DRC debate on the difference between religious (Christian) music and non-religious music (world music) because Marie Misamu rubbed shoulders with everyone, and wondered about the desirability of tributes by artists who do not practice religious music.

== Music career ==
After working with brother Dieka Mbaki Claude, aka brother Debaba and participating in several concerts, Marie Misamu decided to make a solo career. Thus she released the album Béatitudes, est-ce que ? in 2003, the album which did not have much success, probably because of its character "International". It was only in 2004, that his solo career gained momentum with the release of the album Mystère du Voile with songs like "Eh Yahweh" sung in collaboration with Mike Kalambay, "Reconnaissance", "Bilaka", etc. This album whose main language is Lingala was among the best albums of Christian music in 2005 in the DRC. The album was sold to other countries around the world and this allowed Marie Misamu to be promoted to the Muana Mboka event (the Muana Mboka Trophy) in 2005 in Kinshasa. In 2006, Marie Misamu went on tour out of her homeland to sing God and unite Christians around the world. Upon her return to Kinshasa, she is again promoted for the second time at the event Muana Mboka of the 4th edition. In 2008, she released the album "Mystère du Voile (Volume 2)" where we can find songs like: "Salela ngai bikamwa", "Masolo ya kati", "Associé", etc. Then, she collaborates with other Christian musicians such as Charles Mombaya and continues to perform concerts in Africa and Europe. Then, she does not release an album until 2014 year when her third album Mystère du Voile, Volume 3: La Résurrection, in which she sings with her daughter Ruth Misamu on the song: Resurrection. The titles having a clip taken from his last album are Saison, Reconnaissance and Nzambe ya ba defis. Finally, Marie Misamu leaves 7 solo albums on the market: Nazhirea, Who's that girl ?, Vallée ya Bacca, Beatitudes, est-ce que ?, Mystère du Voile, Mystère du Voile (Volume 2), Face B Elonga (100% Adoration) and Mystère du Voile 3: La Résurrection except the one where she sings duet with Debaba and those where she makes collaborations. She has participated in more than 9 albums during her life.

== Discography ==
Studio albums

- Nazhirea, Who's that Girl ? (1998)
- Vallée ya Bacca (1999)
- Ma Prière (2001)
- Béatitudes, est-ce que ? (2003)
- Mystère du Voile (2004)
- Mystère du Voile (Volume 2) (2008)
- Face B Elonga (100% Adoration) (2011)
- Mystère du Voile 3: La Résurrection (2014)
