= BabyDaiz =

Congolese rapper (2001)

- Born: David Manda Nzapa; 13 September 2001 (age 25); Kinshasa, Democratic Republic of the Congo
- Genres: Southern hip-hop; trap; SoundCloud rap; rage; Afrobeats; Afro-fusion; ndombolo
- Occupations: Rapper; songwriter; producer; social media personality
- Instruments: Vocals; DAW; sampler
- Years active: 2016–present
- Labels: 7441 Baby Records; BabydaizEnt; NFH

David Manda Nzapa (born 13 September 2001), known professionally as BabyDaiz and formerly as Daiz King, is a Congolese-born, South African rapper, songwriter, producer, and social media personality. He rose to prominence on TikTok during the COVID-19 pandemic after a video set to Drake's "Toosie Slide" went viral.

Manda moved to Cape Town, South Africa, in 2010 at the age of nine. He developed an interest in music there and started independently uploading songs to SoundCloud under the name Daiz King. After building an online following through TikTok, he released a series of independent records, including Mind of a Brok Boi (2020), Baby Talk (2020), EHH (2021), Ehh Baby: The Big Bang Theory (2022), and NFH: The Mixtape (2024).

He received mainstream recognition with hits such as "Fetty", "Easier by Day", "Deposit", "Enemies", "Matisa", and "Allonsy", with the latter becoming his most commercially successful release.

== Life and career ==
=== 2001–2020: Early life, education, and career beginnings ===
David Manda Nzapa was born on 13 September 2001 in Kinshasa, Democratic Republic of the Congo. In an interview with Hey Shawty on YFM, Manda said that he moved to Cape Town, Western Cape, around 2010 at the age of nine to join an uncle who was already living there. His interest in music developed while he was in the seventh grade, when he began performing with friends at school talent shows. While attending Windsor High School in Lansdowne, he adopted the stage name Daiz King and became known among fellow students for his stage presence and delivery. Daiz King also established an early online following, amassing more than 10,000 followers on Instagram.

In the mid-to-late 2010s, Daiz King started independently sharing music on SoundCloud as Daiz King. His catalog included remixes of popular SoundCloud rap songs, such as Chris Orrick's "Rum & Coke" (2018), as well as original songs including "Water Park" featuring Onedayvacay (2019). As COVID-19 lockdowns began in early 2020, he launched his presence on TikTok and began creating engaging lip-sync skits, dance clips, and trend-driven content. He gained widespread attention after a video set to Drake's "Toosie Slide" went viral, which helped him attract millions of followers and accumulate tens of millions of likes. The increased exposure led to the release of his debut four-track Extended Play (EP), Mind of a Brok Boi through SoundCloud. It included the songs "Diggin My French", "Brok Boi Gotta Hustle", "Brok Boi LifeStyle", and "Bullshit" featuring Razaan Phillips. Other singles he released that year through SoundCloud, included "Dat Cheque", "Like Dis" featuring Emo Ebdn, and "On Watch". Later that year, he adopted the stage name BabyDaiz and issued the four-track EP Baby Talk on 11 December 2020 through 7441 Baby Records, which was supported by the viral song "Fetty".

=== 2021–June 2025: Relocation, moderate success, and "Allez Tobina" and controversy ===
In 2021, BabyDaiz relocated to Johannesburg as his popularity on TikTok rapidly grew. On 19 March, he issued the single "Drop Location". On 3 December of that year, BabyDaiz independently released his debut nine-track mini-album, EHH, through his label BabydaizEnt. It featured guest appearances from Zambian rapper and producer PatricKxxLee, as well as Priddy Prince and Shouldbeyuang, and was supported by the hit "Easier by Day". He followed it with the five-track EP Ehh Baby: The Big Bang Theory on 13 May 2022, issued through his No Family Here (NFH) label and featuring a guest appearance by Lucas Raps. The EP was supported by the hit "Deposit". In June 2023, BabyDaiz released the freestyle "No Days Off", which Hype magazine described as a "scintillating release" that "marks the beginning of his musical journey". Later that year, on 18 August, he featured alongside Blxckie on the song "Six" from PatricKxxLee's album Room 37.

On 19 July 2024, BabyDaiz collaborated with PatricKxxLee and Kindly Nxsh on the single "MIZE". In a review for Hype, Lesiba praised his contribution, stating that BabyDaiz "has a villainous flow to round off the track". On 18 October, he reunited with 25K for the Beyond Talent Agency-released single "Woah Woah", which was later included on his 17-track NFH: The Mixtape, released on 6 December, with "Enemies" becoming the mixtape's breakout single. The mixtape includes guest appearances from Kindly Nxsh, Frank Casino, Kane Keid, and 25K. The next year, on 24 January 2025, BabyDaiz guest-performed on the remix of fellow Congolese-born, U.S.-based rapper and YouTuber Unghetto's bouncy trap track "Top! (Masambe)" alongside Savani. He later appeared on Lesotho-born South African rapper and producer saveHXPE's "80s Baby", which came out on 6 May.

On 13 June, he joined forces with Kvng Vinci to release the single "Allez Tobina". Reviewing the single for SA Music News Magazine, Summer Raine praised it for its "high-energy African rhythms with world-class production", writing that it "redefined the soundscape" while girding BabyDaiz's reputation as a "culture shaper". The song later sparked controversy on social media after some listeners alleged that it contained the K-word. While the official lyric reads, "Pretty boy she's in love wouldn't cuff her", critics claimed the vocal delivery sounded like "Pretty boy she's in love with the Kaffir". Rapper and entrepreneur Siyabonga Themba Metane (aka Slikour) defended BabyDaiz, arguing that younger generations are bearing the consequences of South Africa's failure to adequately preserve and teach its history, heritage, and national identity. He also stated that insufficient investment in the country's arts, entertainment, and music industries has left many youths unaware of historical sensitivities and that the nation's past should not be exploited for politicking.

=== August 2025–present: "Matisa", "Allez Tobina" remix, "Allonsy", and "Coupé" ===
On 15 August, BabyDaiz released the hit single "Matisa" (meaning "lift it up" in Lingala), which was produced by Astro and Mathew Otis. SA Music News Magazine described it as "a spiritual rising through rhythm, rage, and ancestral release". Five months after the original release of "Allez Tobina", BabyDaiz issued a remix on 14 November featuring Kvng Vinci and fellow Congolese singer Rebo Tchulo. Kaniama Bauer of the Kinshasa-based outlet Talents2kin characterized the remix as "a symbol of generational collaboration in Congolese music", noting that BabyDaiz's fusion of his style with Rebo Tchulo's broadened the song's appeal to a wider audience.

On 2 January 2026, BabyDaiz released the ndombolo- and afrobeats-inspired single "Allonsy", which became the most commercially successful release of his career. Before its official debut, the song had already gained significant traction in Nigeria during December 2025 through TikTok dance challenges before spreading across the continent via TikTok, Instagram Reels, and interactive livestreams. The #AllonsyChallenge accumulated millions of views and, according to Talents2kin, established BabyDaiz among the "Congolese artists whose music is making waves across the continent". By the end of January, "Allonsy" had surpassed 4.5 million streams on Spotify. It also helped him build an audience of more than 1.4 million monthly listeners, allowing him to temporarily surpass Fally Ipupa in monthly Spotify listeners.

On 20 February, BabyDaiz appeared on Zakalara's EP Lumière on the song "L'Argent", which encourages the youths to prioritize hard work, perseverance, and discipline as the foundation for a successful future. He followed this with the release of his Afro-fusion and hip-hop-infused single "Coupé" on 24 April, which Hype described as a "confident, celebratory sound rooted in lifestyle, motion, and elevation". On 28 May, BabyDaiz collaborated with Ivorian rapper Himra and Nigerian rapper Zlatan on the song "BITCH & MONEY" from Himra's album Sorry I'm Bad. The song performed strongly in Ivory Coast and other French-speaking African countries, with the media outlet Dopexclusive praising its "production, hard-hitting percussion", and melodies that create a "party-ready environment". On 29 May, he also appeared on Tanzanian singer Marioo's album MMMCXII on the song "Pombe II (We Live Once)".

== Discography ==
=== Mini-albums ===
- EHH (2021)

=== Extended plays ===
- Mind of a Brok Boi (2020)
- Baby Talk (2020)
- Ehh Baby: The Big Bang Theory (2022)

=== Mixtapes ===
- NFH: The Mixtape (2024)
