= Young Paris =

American singer-songwriter

- Born: Milandou Badila; September 13, 1988 (age 37); Paris, France
- Genres: Hip hop; Afrobeats; World music
- Occupations: Singer; songwriter; model; performer
- Labels: Roc Nation

Milandou Badila (born September 13, 1988), known professionally as Young Paris, is a Congolese singer-songwriter, born in Paris and raised in New York. He signed to Jay-Z's Roc Nation in 2016.

== Biography ==
Badila was born in Paris on September 13, 1988, the tenth child of immigrant parents. Both dancers, his mother was a playwright in New York, and his father cofounded the National Ballet of Congo. Badila began his career in music and photography at the age of 15, and at 17, he began dancing and teaching music in New York to grow his career. He took up rapping at the encouragement of the people around him, and started to take his music career seriously.

Badila identified with African culture, and used the Internet hashtag #MelaninMonday to encourage people of color to share their beauty and education. He emerged on the music scene in 2017, after joining forces with Roc Nation through a connection with Jay Electronica's manager, Law Parker. Shortly after signing, Badila released music with Afrobeat heavyweights Olamide, Tiwa Savage, Reekado Banks, and Skales, solidifying his sound and imprint on the African music scene. He released his debut album African Vogue in July 2016, while his 2019 album Blood Diamond fast emerged at the forefront of Afrobeats artists, and has gained over 5 million Spotify streams since its June 2019 release.

Now based in New York and Los Angeles, Badila has won major recognition within the fashion world. Along with landing features in Essence, Vogue, and W Magazine, he is the CFDA Men's Ambassador, appointed by Anna Wintour. After sold-out headlining shows in New York, Los Angeles, and Atlanta, Badila joined Maître Gim's Fuego Tour across Germany in the fall of 2019. He planned to headline a solo North American tour following the release of his debut mixtape, Bad Guy, set to drop on April 21, 2020.

== Discography ==
=== Albums ===
- 2014: Rap | Electronic
- 2016: African Vogue (Deluxe Edition)
- 2017: Afrobeats
- 2018: My Tribe
- 2019: Blood Diamond
