= Moise Mbiye =

Congolese gospel singer

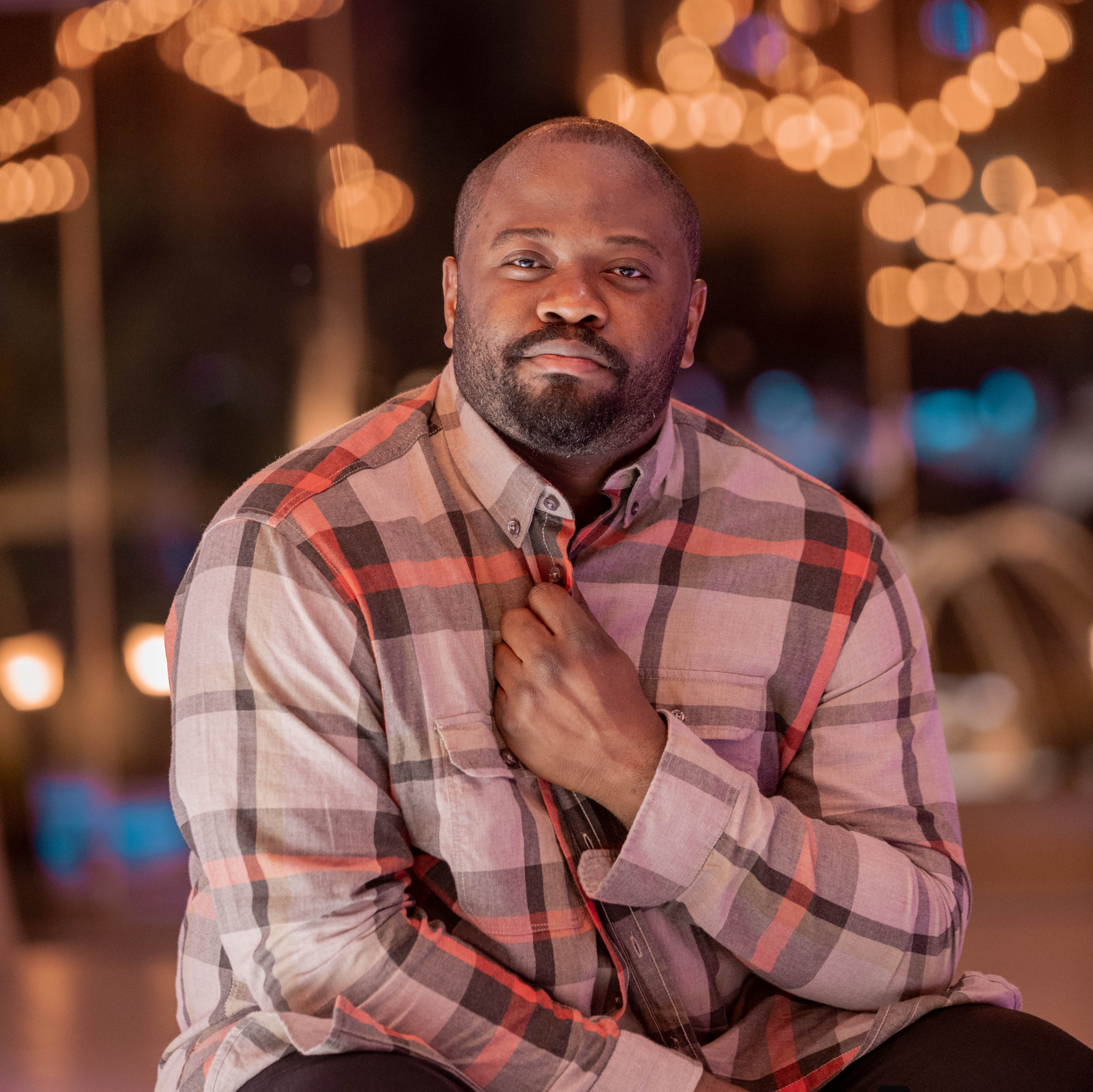

Background information
- Born: September 9, 1980 (age 45); Matete, Kinshasa, Zaire (now Democratic Republic of the Congo)
- Origin: Kinshasa
- Genres: Gospel
- Occupation: Pastor ‧ Singer-songwriter
- Years active: 1995–2022
- Label: Bibomba Music ‧ Sardonyx Production ‧ Fondation Emmanuel
- Formerly of: Les Étoiles de Louange

Moise Mbiye is a Congolese gospel singer-songwriter and pastor in Kinshasa, Democratic Republic of the Congo.

In July 2025, Mbiye was ranked fifth on Billboard France's chart of the most-streamed Congolese artists in France, limited to those who began their careers in either the DRC or the Republic of the Congo.

== Early life ==
Moise Mbiye was born in Kinshasa, in the commune of Matete, on 9 September 1980 in Zaire, to Emmanuel Mbiye and his wife. He is the fifth of nine children. His father, Emmanuel Mbiye Mulaya, was the founder of the Cité Bethel church; he died on 30 August 2021. He later became a pastor following his father's death.

== Musical career ==
At age 10, Mbiye joined a singing group called "Groupe d’adoration Junior". Throughout early adolescence, he continued exploring music, eventually learning piano and guitar at 13.

At age 17, Mbiye joined the group Les Étoiles de Louange (French: The Stars of Praise) as a singer and keyboardist. He participated in the recording of the group's first album titled Litatoli directed by Charles Mombaya. After the success of the group's first album, Mbiye became band leader. In the second album titled "Nzambe na ngai (Lingala: My God), he made his first appearance in the song Alléluia, composed by his father, Emmanuel Mbiye.

Mbiye released his first solo single, "Chantant Alleluia" included in the album. It was composed by his father and featured his sister Lydie Mbiye and Mike Kalambay. Mbiye later rejuvenated Les Étoiles de Louange. which recorded the album Plus que cristal.

A year after that second album, Mbiye left the group and released his first album, "Influence" in 2007. After years of recording and filming, Mbiye released his second album titled "Le Coeur de L'agneau" in 2009 with Sardonyx Production which was also successful and featured leading songs such as Na ndimi and Zala na ngai.

On June 11, 2022, he released a new album titled "Royal". Royal is composed of 13 tracks where we find several styles including "Esimbi te", released three days before the official release of the album On September 29, 2022, on the eve of the release of his new clip "Bilaka ya bomwana", Moise Mbiye reiterated his desire to end his musical career in order to devote himself to his pastoral ministry and his future marriage.

== Pastor ==
After releasing Le Coeur de L'agneau, Mbiye decided to leave his music career and become a Christian pastor. After receiving his baccalaureate, Mbiye deepened his musical knowledge by integrating the INA, but beyond his expectations.

Mbiye started attending a school of theology and became a preacher at Bethel congregation Bethel meeting at Pastor Ignas Ndumbi. Eventually, Mbiye became the youth coordinator (president) of the Bethel JMC missionary youth for Christ.

Mbiye graduated with distinction from theology school, but still remained a preacher. Later he became a preacher at the Bethel Central Assembly Church.

== Discography ==
=== Albums ===
- 2007: Influence, vol. 1
- 2009: Le cœur de l'agneau
- 2013: Champion
- 2016: Totale Adoration II
- 2017: Héros
- 2021: Triomphe
- 2022: Royal
- 2025: Number One

=== EPs ===
- 2019: Ye Oyo
