= Debaba =

Congolese singer and composer (1961–2011)

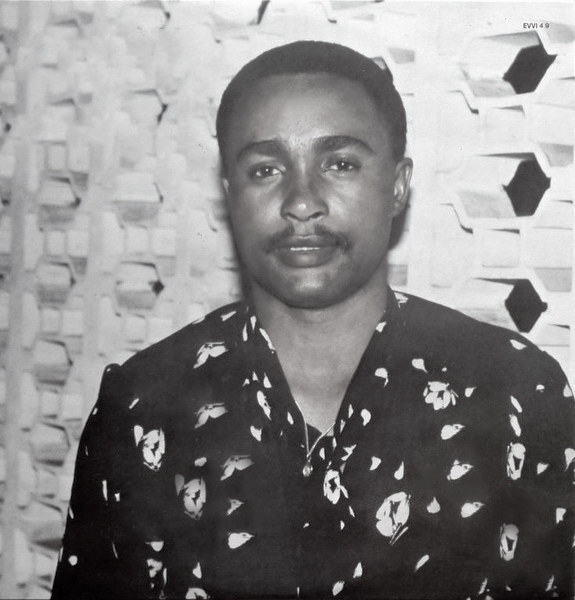
- Debaba in 1985

Background information
- Also known as: Debaba; Debaba El Shabab; Debaba Mbaki
- Born: Cleophas Claude Dieka Mbaki; 12 October 1961; Léopoldville, Republic of the Congo (modern-day Kinshasa, Democratic Republic of the Congo)
- Died: 24 April 2011 (aged 49) Gombe, Kinshasa
- Genres: Congolese rumba; soukous; gospel
- Occupations: Singer; songwriter; bandleader
- Instrument: Vocals
- Years active: 1961–2011
- Labels: Éditions Vévé International; Anytha-Ngapy Productions; Syllart Records; Musicanova; BZ & Associés; Glenn Music; Arme Lourde; Ngoyarto
- Formerly of: Véritable Sakana Musica; Kanako Chipriquez Bango; Viva La Musica; Victoria Eleison; Historia Esthétique; Choc Stars
- Partner(s)
- Children: 6, including Detour, Naomie, Rallyathe, and Sara

Cleophas Claude Dieka Mbaki (12 October 1961 – 24 April 2011), known professionally as Debaba, Debaba El Shabab, or Debaba Mbaki, was a Congolese singer-songwriter and composer. Born and raised in Kinshasa, Dieka made his public musical debut with the band Véritable Sakana Musica. In 1975, he became a member of Kanako Shiprike Bango orchestra, founded by Tonton Boutshie (often spelled Butshe).

Dieka gained widespread recognition through his work with musical groups like Viva La Musica, Victoria Eleison, Historia Musica, and Choc Stars, as well as for composing critically acclaimed hits "Abidjan", "Terminus", "Type" (alternately known as "Tati Kondé"), "Zikondo", and "Célio Déclaré".

== Early life and career ==
=== 1961–1977: Childhood, education and music debut ===
Debaba was born Cleophas Claude Dieka Mbaki on 12 October 1961 in Léopoldville (now Kinshasa), in what was then the Republic of the Congo (and was later Zaire, and is now the Democratic Republic of the Congo). His father, Simba Simba, served in the Zairean military, while his mother, Mbombo Pascaline, worked as a vendor at Marché Central. He grew up in Barumbu, living on Kindu Avenue with his cousin Hyppolite, and attended the Petit Séminaire Saint Jean Berchmans de Lemfu, a Catholic boarding institution operated by the Catholic Brothers, located 32 kilometers away from Kisantu. After his return to Kinshasa, he pursued his education at the Ngiri-Ngiri Athenaeum (Athénée de Ngiri-Ngiri) and later at the Collège Saint Pierre de Kinshasa, where he crossed paths with Derval, leading to the formation of the band Véritable Sakana Musica.

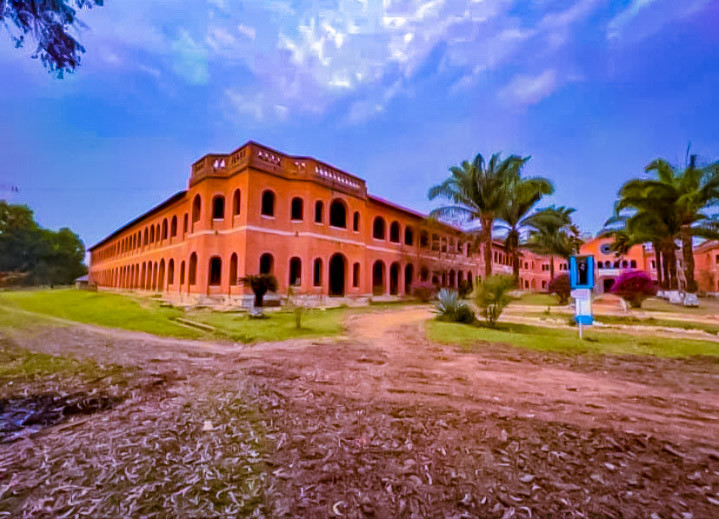
Debaba attended Petit Séminaire Saint Jean-Berchmans de Lemfu, a school in the Diocese of Kisantu.

Debaba and Derval subsequently joined a youth group from the Lingwala commune known as Kanako Chipriquez Bango. This group soon caught the attention of the city's musical elites, earning performances as an opening act for Viva La Musica. Founded by Tonton Boutshie, Kanako became a fertile ground for up-and-coming Zairean artists, including Debaba, who thrived among peers like Derval, Adrida, Joly Mubiala, Wa Zinga, and Djodjo Monga Herion.

=== 1978–1981: Viva La Musica ===
In the late 1970s, Viva La Musica's bandleader and founder Papa Wemba was enduring the physical strain of angina; Debaba seized the opportunity to perform an improvised version of Derval's composition, "Elu Sharufa", during a public performance in Papa Wemba's presence. Impressed by Debaba's distinctively high-pitched tonality, Papa Wemba immediately sought his collaboration and invited him to the studio to record the piece together. This sparked a series of negotiations, which ultimately led to Debaba officially joining Viva La Musica in 1978.

He became part of a lineup that featured prominent Zairean musicians like King Kester Emeneya, Djuna Djanana wa Mpanga, Dindo Yogo, Bipoli, Espérant Djengaka, Fafa De Molokaï, and Rigo Star. He quickly made a name for himself, contributing vocals to almost every song released from late 1978 to 1982, with standout tracks like "Méa Culpa" and "Ngonda" gaining him wide recognition. Debaba was also one of the headlining acts at Papa Wemba's Village de Molokaï, a symbolic recreation of an African village in Matonge, where Papa Wemba enthroned himself as its customary chief. While with Viva La Musica, he composed the 1981 hit "Abidjan" accompanied by Bengali Petit Prince, Fafa De Molokaï and Maray Maray, featuring Huit Kilos Nseka on the guitar and Itshiari Mukulapio on percussion (lokole).

=== 1982: Victoria Eleison ===
Following an internal rupture within Viva La Musica in 1982, Debaba departed and co-founded Victoria Eleison with King Kester Emeneya and Bipoli, with the endorsement of music journalist Jeannot Ne Nzau Diop. The newly established group also boasted an elite membership, including Petit Prince Bengali, Huit Kilos, Tofla Kitoko, Safro, Pinos, Patcho Star, Ekoko Mbonda, Mongo Ley, and Jolly Mubiala Baki Amen. Debaba's stint with Victoria Eleison was relatively short, and he soon left to create his musical group.

=== 1983–1984: Historia Esthétique ===
Debaba departed from Victoria Eleison to form the orchestra Historia Musica and proposed that Koffi Olomide, whom he had met a few years earlier, collaborate with him. The orchestra was established in 1983. Debaba became a founding member, while Koffi was appointed president and backup singer, with Lélé Nsundi serving as the artistic director. Historia Musica included other members like Cele Le Roi, Desouza Santu, Koko Anana Efoloko, Muzola Ngunga (formerly of Orchestre Kiam), Laza le Chestre, Coco Coluche, Djoe Mile, Derval, Adamo Leovis, Moreno, Athos, Autri, Commando, and Lokombe Bola Bolite.

After Koffi Olomide departed a few months later to pursue solo ventures, Debaba and Lélé Nsundi rebranded the group as Historia Esthétique. Lélé Nsundi then went into exile in Gabon, where he later died. Debaba managed Historia Esthétique independently and signed with Verckys Kiamuangana Mateta's label, Éditions Vévé International. The band released the four-track long play Kayikoley in 1985, which included Debaba's compositions "Mille Baisers", "Mama Lomé", and the title track, with Mukendi writing the song "Muke". Despite these releases, Debaba encountered challenges in promoting Historia Esthétique and terminated his contract with Éditions Vévé International before joining Benoit "Ben" Mutombo Nyamabo's soukous band Choc Stars that same year.

=== 1985–1994: Choc Stars ===
In 1985, Choc Stars, one of the most prominent Zairean bands, was experienced significant upheaval after the consecutive departure of several key members, including Bozi Boziana, Sedjoka, Monza 1er, and Fifi Mofude, which left Choc Stars' once-powerful vocal lineup severely depleted, with only Ben Nyamabo, Petit Prince, Général Defao, and Djuna Djanana wa Mpanga remaining. Debaba was recruited alongside Nzaya Nzayadio and Carlyto Lassa to rejuvenate the band's vocal section. He quickly became the band's standout performer, achieving widespread acclaim for his vocal performances on several hit songs such as "Engombe", "Celio Déclarant", "Futi", "Libala Ya Bosembo", and "Type" (alternately known as "Tati Kondé"). He also contributed his voice to guitarist Roxy Tshimpaka's "Jardin de mon cœur", Ben Nyamabo's "Riana" and "Kelemani", Djuna Djanana's "Mbuma Elengi", Carlyto Lassa's "Mauvais Souvenir", "Pressé te", "Terminus", and "Mokolo Mosusu", the latter of which was written by Sedjoka.

Debaba made one of his most notable contributions to Choc Stars in 1986 with the release of his composition "Zikondo" from the album Akufa Lobi Akomi Moto. The first part included intricate guitar riffs by Roxy Tshimpaka, bass rhythms by Djo Mali, drumbeats by Otis Edjudju, along with vocals from Debaba and backing by Carlyto. "Zikondo" garnered positive reception and critical praise, securing notable recognition in Zaire and the Republic of the Congo. According to the Agence d'Information d'Afrique Centrale, the song "seduced Congolese music lovers" and helped "enrich the discography of the orchestra Choc Stars". In 1988, he released his debut solo LP Sauvetage, which featured the widely recognized single "Abidjan" (revised) and subsequent tracks like "L'amour Du Risque", "Wydeza", "Toli Ya Libala", and the eponymous single. While still with Choc Stars, Debaba collaborated with Carlyto, Vincent Dusart, and Nzaya Nzayadio on a 1989 trio album project titled Zaïco (a contraction of Zaïre-Congo). He also appeared in Rapha Bounzeki's album Résultat du Dimanche alongside Carlyto that same year. However, as the 1990s dawned, Choc Stars started to lose its pace. Band members gradually left, and Debaba remained the sole leader, steering the group through challenging times as its conductor and president until his eventual departure in 1994.

=== From secular to gospel music ===
Following his exit from Choc Stars, Debaba briefly reunited with Papa Wemba for a joint African and European tour with Viva La Musica. Though Wemba had long viewed Debaba as his vocal heir, the latter experienced a profound personal transformation during the tour's planning. In 1995, he renounced secular music, embraced Christian music, and became Brother Debaba. He began preaching after completing evangelical training, and in 1997, he made a guest appearance on up-and-coming Zairean gospel singer Marie Misamu's debut album Nazhiréa (Who's That Girl?), which introduced her to the wider Zairean audience. The album's success, especially the hit "Le Dieu qui connait tout", helped launch Misamu's solo career. That same year, Debaba also contributed guest lead vocals on Congolese gospel singer Annie Ngwe Mobejo's studio album Roi Vainqueur.

That year, Debaba released the album Musamaliya, which was co-produced by BZ & Associés and Glenn Music. Consisting of eight tracks, the album featured spiritually uplifting songs like "Musamaliya", "La Conversion", "Libala", "La Réconciliation", "La croix est le terminus", "Louange À Dieu", and "La Divinité," with an instrumental version of "La Réconciliation" included.

== Death ==
In 2010, Debaba survived a cerebrovascular accident (CVA) and received appropriate treatment in South Africa. In April 2011, he suffered a subsequent stroke and was admitted to Ngaliema Clinic in Kinshasa's Gombe commune. After a two-week stay at the clinic, Debaba was discharged to undergo physiotherapy at home to mitigate the lingering effects of brain damage from the stroke. Following a sudden relapse, he was rushed back to Ngaliema Clinic. On 24 April 2011, Debaba died at approximately 2 am. His funeral, coordinated by Prophet Jacques Neema Sikatenda and UMUCO acting president Blaise Bula, took place on 4 May, with his burial at Mbenseke Cemetery in the Mont-Ngafula commune.

== Discography ==
=== Solo ===
- Sauvetage (1988)
- Debaba et Soukous Stars (1991)
- Licencié sans Fonction (with Madilu System) (1994)
- Musamaliya (1997)
- Seigneur (alternatively named Nazhirea (Who's That Girl?) (1998)
- Il est au-dessus de Tout (1998)
- Lisitwale (1999)
- Merci Jésus (2010)

=== With Viva La Musica ===
- "Abidjan" (1981)

=== With Historia Esthétique ===
- Kayikoley (1985)
- Faux Parisien (1985)

=== With Choc Stars ===
- "Zikondo" (1987)
- Zaïco (with Vincent Dusart and Nzaya Nzayadio) (1989)
