= Kazumba, Kasai-Central =

Coordinates: 6.417°S 22.033°E

Kazumba is a location in Kasai-Central, the Democratic Republic of the Congo. It is served by a station on the mainline of the national railways of Congo. It is home to the Cathedral of St. Joseph Mikalayi, a Roman Catholic cathedral.

== See also ==
- Railway stations in DRCongo
- Martin Ntenda, Deputy for Kazumba
