= Alphonse Maindo =

Congolese political scientist

- Education: University of Kisangani; Pantheon-Sorbonne University
- Awards: Claude Ake Memorial Award
- Scientific career
- Fields: Political science; African studies
- Workplaces: University of Kisangani; Goree Institute; Catholic University of Central Africa

Alphonse Maindo Monga Ngonga is a Congolese political scientist. At the University of Kisangani, he has been a professor of political science, the director of the Center for Political and Social Research in Africa, and the honorary dean of the Faculty of Social Sciences, Administration, and Law. He has also been the coordinator of the Democracy and Development program at the Goree Institute in Dakar, and he directed the Central African Political Observatory at the Catholic University of Central Africa in Yaoundé. Maindo specializes in the study of political conflicts and wars, conflict resolution, state development and reconstruction, and elections in Africa.

== Education and positions ==
Maindo was born in Kisangani. In 1990, Maindo graduated from The University of Kisangani with a degree in political and administrative sciences. From 1990 to 1992, he taught at the Institut Maele (fr). From 1992 to 1998 he taught at the Higher Educational Institute of Kisangani (fr), and from 1993 to 1995 at the Kisangani Higher Institute of Medical Techniques (fr). In 1995 he became an assistant professor at the University of Kisangani in the Faculty of Social, Political, and Administrative Sciences. In 1997, he was selected as an election scrutineer in the March ballot organized by the Alliance of Democratic Forces for the Liberation of Congo.

Maindo received a grant from the Government of France to study at The Paris-Sorbonne University, where he obtained a graduate diploma in African studies and political science, followed by a doctorate in political science. In 2004, he became a postdoctoral researcher at the Catholic University of Central Africa. In 2006, he began lecturing there, and he was appointed by the Government of the Democratic Republic of the Congo to the political science faculty at the University of Kisangani. At the University of Kisangani, Maindo subsequently became director of the Center for Political and Social Research in Africa, and the honorary dean of the Faculty of Social Sciences, Administration, and Law at The University of Kisangani. He also became coordinator the Democracy and Development program at the Goree Institute and directed the Central African Political Observatory at the Catholic University of Central Africa.

== Research ==
In 2001, Maindo published the book Voter en temps de guerre (Voting in times of war), with a preface by Herbert F. Weiss. The book concerns the 1997 election in Kisangani in which Maindo had been an auditor, arguing that this election was a rare historical event because it was carried out with minimal preparation and cost through a show of hands in an open forum, and was a landmark democratic moment in the Democratic Republic of the Congo.

In 2004, Maindo was given the Claude Ake Memorial Award of the Africa-America Institute and the African Studies Association, funded by the Ford Foundation, which is awarded annually to outstanding young scholars. In 2007, he published Des conflits locaux à la guerre régionale en Afrique centrale (From local conflicts to regional war in Central Africa), a study of the sources and nature of the conflicts that recurred in the Democratic Republic of the Congo between 1996 and 2007.

Maindo published another book in 2015, called L'Etat à l'épreuve de la guerre en Afrique centrale : Violences et recompositions sociales et politiques (The state tested by war in Central Africa: violence and sociopolitical reconstruction). In L'Etat à l'épreuve de la guerre en Afrique centrale, Maindo argues that the end of various postcolonial compromises has shaken the foundations of modern stability in Central Africa, weakening governance and demanding state reconstruction.

In 2018, Maindo became the director of Tropenbos International in the Democratic Republic of the Congo, which advocates against unsustainable uses of forests. Maindo is also a noted campaigner against nepotism and favoritism in the granting of grades and degrees to the relatives of powerful people in Congolese universities. He is a frequent media commentator on the politics of the Democratic Republic of the Congo in outlets including The BBC, Radio Okapi, Actualite.cd, il Cambiamento, and MediaCongo and Afrikarabia. His work on Congolese politics has also been cited by governmental agencies like the Belgian Centre national de coopération au développement.

== Selected works ==
- Voter en temps de guerre (2001)
- Des conflits locaux à la guerre régionale en Afrique centrale (2007)
- L'Etat à l'épreuve de la guerre en Afrique centrale : Violences et recompositions sociales et politiques (2015)

== Selected awards ==
- Claude Ake Memorial Award, Africa-America Institute and African Studies Association (2004)
