= Tshanda Sangwa =

Congolese actor and musician (born 1996)

- Born: July 26, 1996 (age 29); Geneva
- Occupations: Actor, musician
- Years active: 1996-present

Tshanda Sangwa (born 26 July 1996) is a Swiss-Congolese actor and musician.

== Biography ==
Sangwa was born in Geneva in 1996. His parents are both musicians: his father Maray was a singer and dancer in Papa Wemba's orchestra, and his mother Sonia, was a Swiss music teacher. He said that he received no family pressure to pursue a music career.

In November 2001, he appeared in the commercial "Bébé Rico" advertising children's cosmetic products. Very soon thereafter, he became known by the public under the name "Baby Tshanda". For his first concert in June 2002, at the age of six, Sangwa performed at the Halle de la Gombe in Kinshasa in front of 50,000 spectators. In November 2002, he was appointed Ambassador for the Rights of the Child by the European Foundation for the Rights of the Child.

In August 2003, Sangwa performed at the 4th Pan-African Music Festival (FESPAM) in Brazzaville, sharing the stage with Youssou N'Dour, Manu Dibango, Magic System, and Koffi Olomide. Sangwa received the "Revelation Fespam 2003" prize. For his first film role, in August 2004, he played the Little Prince in Mwezé Ngangura's film Les Habits Neufs du Gouverneur.

In April 2006, Sangwa served as a guide for the "little zebras" in Kinshasa: a program of the Swiss Romande Radio. The recordings were made in different schools and have as their main topic the rights of the child. The program won a prize in Switzerland, and "the little zebras" were able to participate in the major international radio competition for the rights of the child in Egypt.

After his parents separated in 2008, Sangwa moved to Switzerland with his mother. In 2011, he participated in the program Die grössten Schweizer Talente on SF1. Sangwa subsequently focused on his studies and put his music career on hold. He released an album, Yele, in June 2019.
