= Henriette Wamu =

Henriette Wamu Atamina (born 1966) is a politician and media executive from the Democratic Republic of the Congo. She is a member of parliament in the National Assembly.

== Life ==
Henriette Wamu was born on 28 March 1966 in Kinshasa. Originally from Sankuru, Wamu was educated at the Sacred Heart High School in Gombe, Kinshasa. Leaving DRC to study in Belgium , she started studying physiotherapy at ISCAM, then started again in business at the Lucien Cooremans Institute in Brussels, gaining a degree in accounting in 1989 and a license to practice accounting in 1994. From 1998 to 2002 she was Commercial Director of the television channel Télé Kin Malebo (TKM). In 2003 she began managing another private television channel in Kinshasa, CMB DIGI.

Wamu was elected deputy for Funa District in the 2006 general election.

In 2008 Wamu also became naturalized as a Belgian citizen. Though she was re-elected in the 2011 general election, her 2018 candidacy was initially rejected on the grounds she did not have exclusive Congolese nationality. However, the Constitutional Court ruled her candidacy legitimate, and she was again re-elected in the 2018 general election.

Wamu is the driving force in the Alliance for the Progress of Congo (APC). She is also chair of the DRC Parliamentary Caucus of the Israel Allies Foundation (IAC). In November 2020 she founded the Alliance for the Reform of the Republic (A2R), member of the group of allies of the Union for Democracy and Social Progress (UDPS), to "play the avant-garde role of standard bearer within this group". She called for a bill to raise Étienne Tshisekedi, father of the current DRC President Félix Tshisekedi, to be recognised as 'father of democracy' in DRC.

Pourelle.info included Wamu in their 2021 list of fifty inspirational women.
