= Noëlla Ayeganagato =

Congolese politician

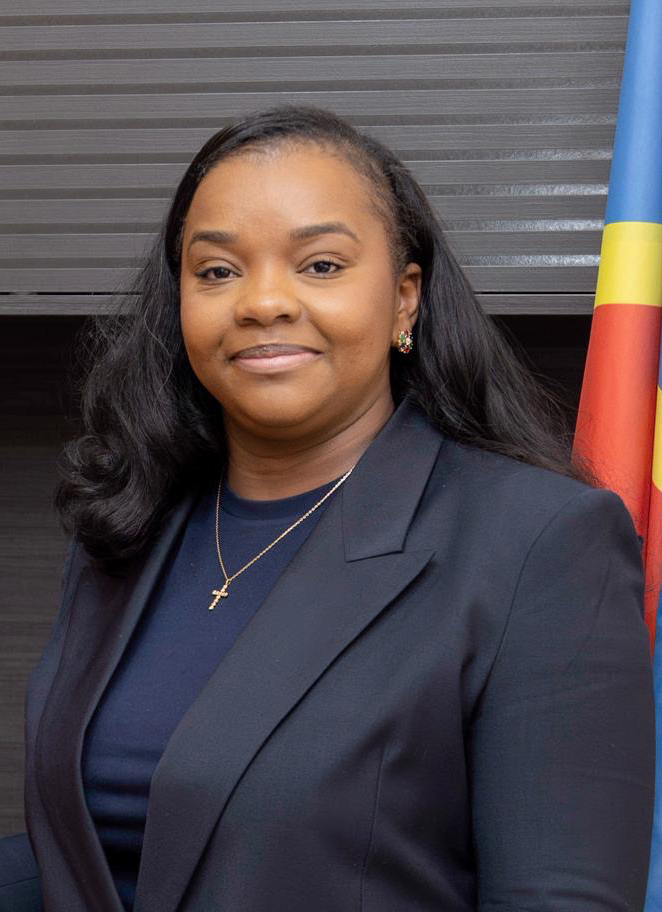
- Ayeganagato in 2026
- Born: 25 December 1994 (age 31); Kinshasa, Congo
- Occupation: Politician
- Political party: Front of Independent Christian Democrats
- Children: 2

Noëlla Ayeganagato Nakwipone (born 25 December 1994) is a Congolese politician. She was the minister of youth and patriotic awakening from 2024 to August 2025 when she became the deputy minister of foreign affairs.

== Early life and education ==
Ayeganagato was born in Kinshasa in 1994. She attended the Protestant University in the Congo and she graduated with a degree in economics.

== Career ==
In 2018, she joined the Front of Independent Christian Democrats (FIDEC).

She was the minister of youth and patriotic awakening from June 2024 to August 2025. UNICEF had organised a course for young entrepreneurs in the DRC. The best were invited to meet the minister and they were assured the support of the ministry for their emerging businesses.

On 8 August 2025 the president announced changes to the government which was still led by Judith Suminwa. Ayeganagato was named as a deputy minister of foreign affairs. Crispin Mbadu Phanzu was the relevant minister. She had particular responsibility for French speakers and the DRC's diasporo.

In January 2026 she was in Davos at the World Economic Forum with the DRC president.

== Controversy ==
After she became a minister, concern was raised that she had posted pictures of herself that did not support her new position. It was noted that she had done this in her youth.
