= Carlyto Lassa =

Congolese musician (1961–2026)

- Born: Charles Ndombasi Lassa; 15 January 1961; Kongo Central, Democratic Republic of the Congo
- Died: 31 August 2026 (aged 65) Cincinnati, Ohio, U.S.
- Genres: Congolese rumba; gospel
- Occupations: Singer; songwriter; guitarist; evangelical pastor
- Instruments: Vocals; guitar
- Years active: 1970s–2026
- Labels: Rythmes et Musique; Anytha-Ngapy Productions; Gina Kiaku Productions; Syllart Productions; Baby Kwayo
- Formerly of: Singa Mwambe; Les Bourgeois; Bisengo; Tout Choc Oka; TPOK Jazz; Choc Stars
- Website: carlytolasssa.com

Charles Ndombasi Lassa (15 January 1961 – 31 August 2026), known professionally as Carlyto Lassa, Carlito, or Carlitto, was a Congolese singer, songwriter, guitarist, and later evangelical pastor. He was known for his work in Congolese rumba, particularly with TPOK Jazz and Choc Stars.

In the 1970s, Lassa performed with Singa Mwambe, Les Bourgeois, and Bisengo before joining Tout Choc Oka. He joined Franco Luambo's TPOK Jazz in 1984. He primarily worked with guitarist and composer Simaro Lutumba on solo recordings, and was known for performing hits such as "Maya" (1984) by Lutumba and "Le Bon Samaritain" (1984) by Papa Noël Nedulé. The following year, he joined Choc Stars and contributed to hits including Ben Nyamabo's "Riana" (1986), Roxy Tshimpaka's "Jardin de mon cœur" (1986), Debaba's "Zikondo" (1986), and his own composition "Mauvais Souvenir Bwana" (1986). He later pursued a solo career, releasing the album Africa Na Moto in 1996, which featured the hit "Makolo ya massiya".

After converting to Christianity, Lassa moved away from secular music and devoted himself to gospel music and evangelical ministry. His Christian recordings included La Reconnaissance (2001) and Confiance – Kili Kili Azongi (2004).

== Early life and career ==
Charles Ndombasi Lassa was born on 15 January 1961 in what is now Kongo Central province, Democratic Republic of the Congo. He grew up in Matadi, where he worked as a tailor before pursuing music professionally. Lassa's interest in music developed in the 1970s. He was a member of Singa Mwambe, Les Bourgeois and Bisengo before moving to Tout Choc Oka, a Kinshasa band whose musicians would later largely join Zaïko Langa Langa. In 1978, at the age of 17, he attracted the attention of baritone singer Gérard Madiata and, subsequently, bassist Celi Bitshou while he was with Tout Choc Oka.

Lassa joined TPOK Jazz in 1984, after Bitshou introduced him to Simaro Lutumba. Lassa's arrival strengthened TPOK Jazz's roster of vocalists and coincided with a successful period for the group's Kinshasa-based wing. Lutumba and guitarist Papa Noël Nedulé particularly admired his distinctive "honey-like" voice. He appeared alongside Pépé Kallé on Lutumba's album Likita Ya Bilima, under Lutumba's direction. The album featured Lutumba's "Verre Cassé" and "Maya", Lassa's "Nasala Nini?", and Denis Bonyeme's "Namekaki Bango". Other musicians on the recording included bassist Flavien Makabi, mi-solo guitarist Rodeo, Papa Noël Nedule, tumba drummer Henri "Micorason" Weteto-Sasa, and saxophonist Empompo Deyesse. "Verre Cassé" and "Maya" became widely popular and were regarded as classics of Congolese rumba. Music critic Simba Ndaye praised Lutumba's "melancholic poetry" in "Verre Cassé", pointing out Lassa's purposely rough-sounding voice and comparing it with Pépé Kallé's "thunderous baritone timbre". Lassa's work on the album helped him reach a larger fanbase and become better known in the Congolese music scene. That same year, he also sang on Papa Noël Nedule's hit "Le Bon Samaritain".

At the end of 1984, "Maya" and "Bon Samaritain" ranked first and second, respectively, for Best Song of the year, while Lassa was named Revelation of the Year. In 1985, he contributed "Ekoti Ya Nzube" to TPOK Jazz's album Mario. That same year, Lassa recorded his debut album Pangala, released through Rythmes et Musique and later joined Ben Nyamabo's Choc Stars. Starting from the following year, Lassa provided lead vocals on Choc Stars hits including Nyamabo's "Riana" (1986) and composed the tracks "Mauvais Souvenir Bwana" (1986), "Ngonda" (1988) and "Premier Amour" (1989). As he worked with Choc Stars and TPOK Jazz, he became recognized for his unique voice in Congolese rumba throughout the 1980s and 1990s.

== Solo career ==
After relocating to Paris in the 1990s, Lassa pursued a solo career. In 1992, he appeared on Mayaula Mayoni's Tamaris-produced album L'Amour Au Kilo, contributing to songs including "Doudou a Mwen", "Ko Tika Te", "L'Amour Au Kilo", "Ousmane Bakayoko", and "Mamiwata".

Lassa's album Africa Na Moto was released in 1996 through Syllart Records, a Paris-based label specializing in African and Afro-Latin music founded by Senegalese producer Ibrahima Sylla. Lassa arranged and co-produced the album with Nado Kakoma. Its programming was handled by Ernest Mvouama, Jean Mukazi, and Maika Munan. Lassa also played solo guitar alongside Dally Kimoko, Caien Madoka, Dizzy Mandjeku, Lokassa Ya Mbongo, and Popolipo. The bass parts were played by Guy Nsangué and Ngouma Lokito, while Mavungu Malanda played the tumba drums.

The Congolese rumba hit "Makolo ya massiya" became popular and tells the story of a woman abandoned by a lover named Kinsala, whom she believes has chosen another woman for her wealth. The song invokes Christian imagery, including the suffering of Jesus, to frame the woman's pain. During the recording of Africa Na Moto, Lassa converted to Christianity and subsequently decided that the album would be his final secular musical release.

== Conversion to Christianity ==
In 1997, Lassa gradually withdrew from secular popular music and devoted himself to Christian music, preaching, and evangelical ministry. He was subsequently known as Pastor Carlyto Lassa and worked as an evangelical preacher and gospel singer in France. His Christian recordings included the albums La Reconnaissance (2001) and Confiance – Kili Kili Azongi (2004). His ministry involved preaching, worship, evangelization campaigns, and Christian seminars.

== Death ==
Lassa died from a heart attack in Cincinnati, Ohio, on 31 August 2026, at the age of 65. He had travelled to the United States to participate in an evangelization campaign on 29 and 30 August. His death was confirmed by his pastoral community, and subsequently reported by Congolese media.

It prompted an outpouring of tributes from across the Congolese music and Christian communities. Reddy Amisi remembered him as "a talented artist who made his mark on our music", while Ferré Gola credited Lassa's voice and career with inspiring him to become the singer he is today, calling his death "the departure of a major artistic figure". Werrason accentuated Lassa's influence on successive generations of Congolese musicians, and gospel singer Teddy Diso hailed him as a "great master". Kool Matope, recalling their shared musical projects, described the loss as particularly painful, writing, "We still had so much to accomplish". Aimé Nkanu paid tribute to his "friend and brother", Franck Mulaja remembered "a voice that will forever mark the history of Congolese music", and Anne Keps honored the memory of a voice that had marked Congolese music. The Ministry of Culture, Arts and Heritage, Yolande Elebe Ma Ndembo, likewise stated that "his voice has fallen silent, but his work remains in our collective memory".

== Discography ==
=== Albums ===
- Pangala (1985)
- Africa Na Moto (1996)
- La Reconnaissance (2001)
- Confiance – Kili Kili Azongi (2004, with Golly Imengo)
