= Charles Mombaya =

Congolese singer and composer (1956–2007)

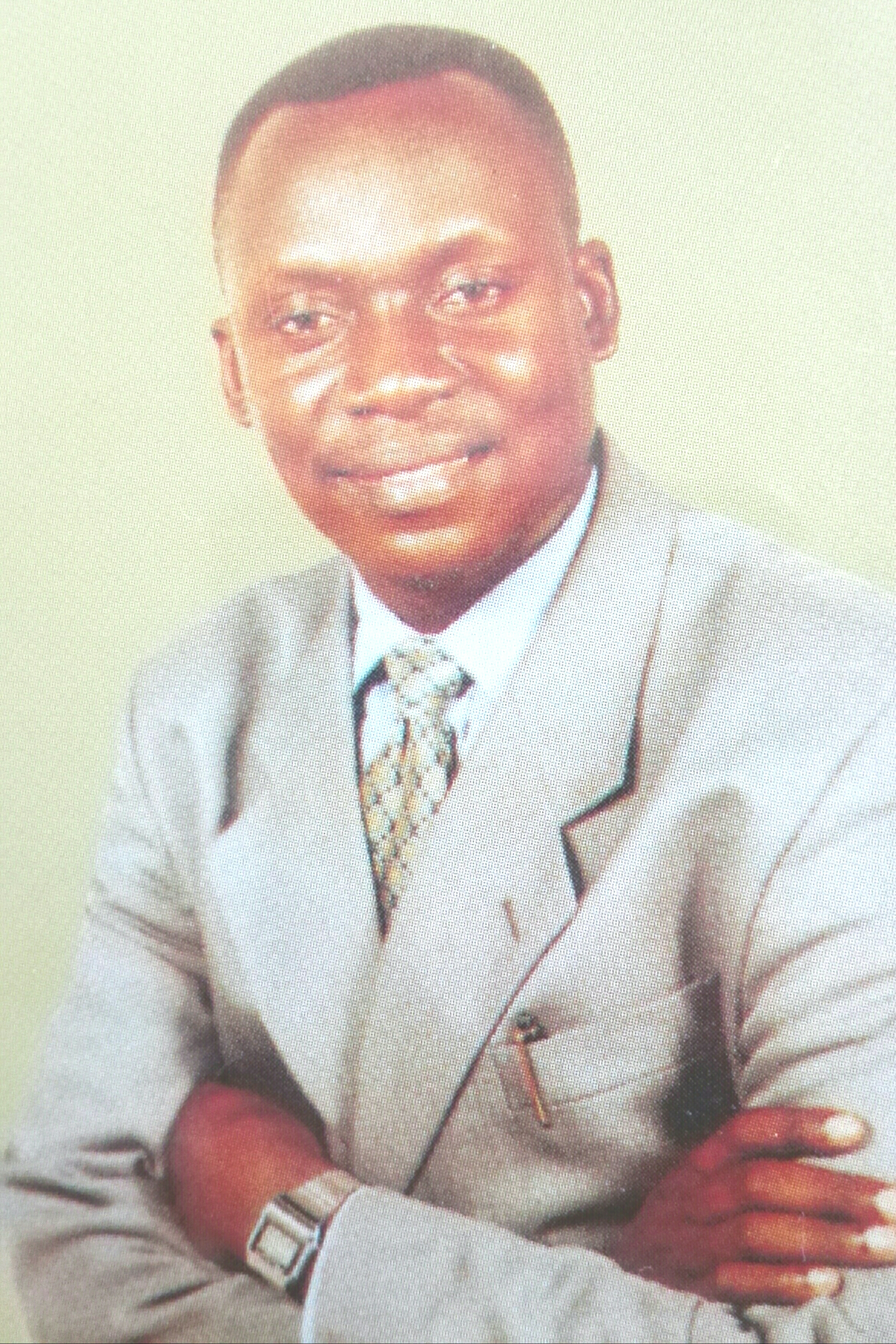

Background information
- Born: Charles Mombaya Massani; 31 October 1956; Léopoldville, Belgian Congo (now Kinshasa, Democratic Republic of the Congo)
- Died: 20 May 2007 (aged 50) Kinshasa, Democratic Republic of the Congo
- Genres: Gospel/christian music; Spiritual music; Jazz
- Instruments: flute; guitar; piano
- Years active: 1974–2007
- Label: ASIFIWE s.p.r.l

Charles Mombaya Massani was a Congolese singer, arranger, songwriter, performer and producer, and the former Evangelical Baptist Christian deacon of the Fleuve Baptist Church.

He was born on 31 October 1956 in Léopoldville (now Kinshasa) and died on 20 May 2007 (aged 50). He produced 20 albums and created ASIFIWE s.p.r.l. which gave a great head start to future gospel singers in Zaire (now Democratic Republic of the Congo).

He was the founder and president of the Association of Christian Musicians of Congo (AMCC) which he held office to until his death.

== Biography ==
Charles Mombaya Massani was born on October 31, 1956 in Léopoldville, Belgian Congo. His father was Charles Miswanga Nabar from the Bandundu province and his mother was Catherine Ngonde from the Équateur province.

Mombaya comes from a family of fourteen children of whom he was the oldest. In 1974, he was baptized in a Baptist church.

In 1975, he created the choir "Les Ambassadeurs du Christ" with which he won several prizes including that of Best Mixed Choir in 1981, during one of the first National Festival of Christian Choirs, organized by Catholic, Protestant and Kimbanguist Churches.

In 1979, he was nominated for the anthem competition of the Organization of African Unity, during the same year he was admitted as a member of the famous vocal group in which he served as director technical assistant. He directs a choir made up of 5,000 singers on the occasion of Cathédrale du Centenaire Protestant, a cathedral that is a part of the Church of Christ in the Congo.

In 1980, he created “Les Messagers”, the first gospel quartet in the former Zaire. Founded by Mombaya, 85 Congolese Christian musicians produced for the first time an audio/video album titled Asifiwe (Swahili: Praise God) whose success would soon extend beyond the borders of then Zaire. Charles Mombaya is also the founder of the Association of Christian Musicians of Congo (AMCC) of which he was president until his death.

In 1982, he was in charge of the national music program at the general secretariat of the Church of Christ in Congo (CCC). The same year, he was consecrated deacon by the Baptist Community of the Congo River. In 1983, Charles Mombaya's songs had won 1^{st} prize at the first university music festival.

In 1986, he obtained a diploma from the National Institute of Arts (INA) in Kinshasa.

Charles Mombaya was a member of the International Federation for Choral Music since 1989.

Accompanied by a choir of 30 young Congolese, Charles Mombaya was appointed by UNESCO to represent Africa at the Hiroshima Memorial in Japan in 1995. Give years later, UNESCO will call on him again to host a conference on the cultural heritage in the era of globalization in Jordan.

In Paris where he was preparing his doctorate in musicology, Charles Mombaya created the Asifiwe choir in 1995 which accompanied him on some of his tours around the world. Charles Mombaya held a graduate diploma in music from the National Institute of Arts (NIA), a Master's degree in musicology and a Diploma of advanced studies (DAE) in French literature from the University of Sorbonne (Paris-IV).

In order to promote young talents in Christian music, Charles Mombaya created the show "Stars pour Jésus" (French: "Stars for Jesus") in June 2002. During the same month, he was the only Christian musician to be decorated by the Congolese government with the “Médaille de Mérite Artistique”. In December of the same year, he was named "Best Christian Musician of the Year" by the Mérite Congo Awards.

A composer of around a hundred songs, Charles Mombaya has toured several times around the world, notably in France, Belgium, Holland, Germany, Portugal, Spain, Switzerland, Great Britain, Norway, in the United States, Haiti, Japan, Jordan, Angola, etc. Charles Mombaya has already produced 20 albums including 12 VHS/DVD and 10 CDs.

In 1996, he obtained a master's degree in musicology and a diploma in advanced studies in literature from Paris-Sorbonne University (Paris-IV).

In order to promote Christian music, Charles Mombaya set up a production house (ASIFIWE s.p.r.l.) which included a recording studio, two video editing benches and a distribution house of which he was president and director general.

== Death ==
Charles Mombaya died on Sunday May 20, 2007 at 11:30 a.m. in his home due to chronic illness. His funeral brought together thousands of people with the presence of several Christian musicians, delegations from the provinces of the DRC and other countries, political-administrative authorities and religious leaders at the Protestant Centenary Cathedral in the city of Kinshasa, including then First Lady Olive Lembe di Sita. Charles Mombaya was buried on Tuesday May 29, 2007 at the Kinkole Cemetery in Kinshasa.

== Discographie ==
- 1992 - Asifiwe
- 1994 - El Shaddai
- 1995 - Jéhovah Jiré
- 1996 - Jéhovah Shalom
- 1996 - There is No God Like Jesus
- 1997 - Louange Plus
- 1998 - Rabbi
- 1999 - Gospel Plus
- 1999 - Retro
- 2000 - Tu es Dieu
- 2002 - Témoignage
- 2003 - Inch'allah
- 2004 - Allô! Téléphone

== DVD & VHS Clips ==
- 1992 - Asifiwe
- 1994 - El Shaddai (2 Versions)
- 1995 - Jéhovah Jiré
- 1996 - Jéhovah Shalom
- 1997 - Louange Plus
- 1998 - Rabbi
- 1999 - Gospel Plus
- 1999 - Retro
- 2000 - Tu es Dieu
- 2002 - Témoignage
- 2003 - Inch'allah
- 2005 - Allô! Téléphone
- 2006 - La Consécration

== Concerts ==
- 1999: Concert en Espagne (VHS)
- 1999: Concert à Montréal (VHS)
- 2000: Concert d'Action de Grâce (25 ans de Ministère) au stade Tata Raphael (VHS)
- 2002: Charles Mombaya, Mbuta Kamoka, René Lokua, Carlyto Lassa, José Fataki - Unité, concert à Paris (VHS)
- 2004: Live à Londres - CD+DVD

== Notes and references ==
=== Bibliography ===
- Ferdinand Kato (2007). "Le Maestro Charles Mombaya : sa vie, sa carrière". L'Avenir – via DigitalCongo.net.
- Kambu Nsasi (2007). "Charles Mombaya n'est plus: Biographie". CongoPlanète.com.
- Boni Tsala T. (2013). "Six ans après sa mort, Charles Mombaya honoré par les siens à travers des conférences". DigitalCongo.net.
- "Paul Balenza : Malgré la mort de Monbaya, l'Association des Musiciens Chrétiens du Congo va continuer d'exister". RadioOkapi.net. 2007. radiookapi20070530.
- Roger Lembi Labana (2008). "Mombaya, Masani Charles". Dictionnaire biographique des chrétiens d'Afrique.
