= Léonnie Kandolo =

Congolese human rights activist and government minister (born 1960)

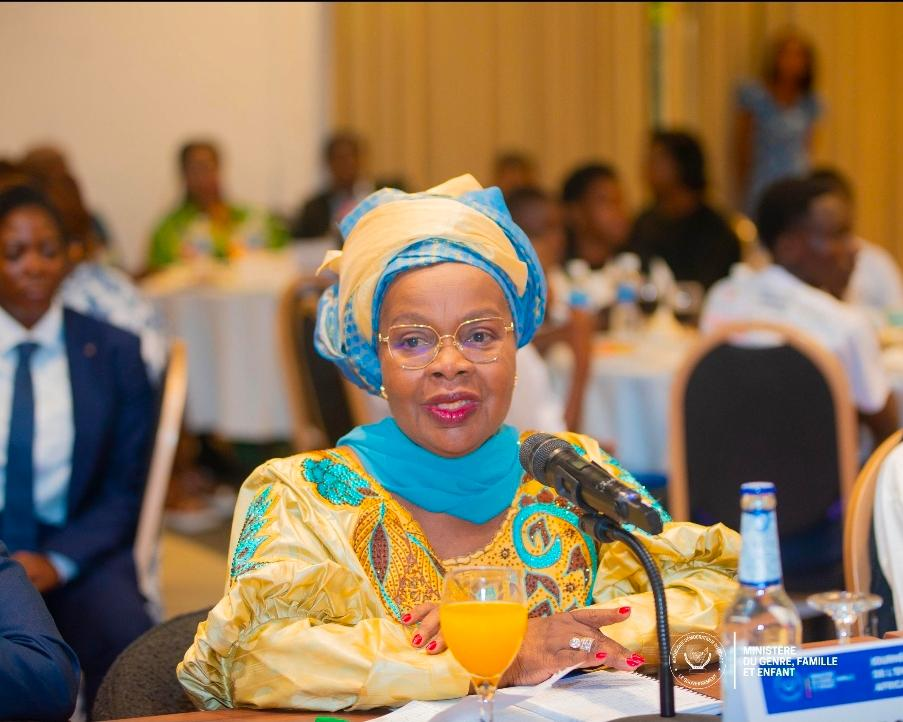

Minister of Gender, Family, and Children
- Incumbent
- Assumed office 13 June 2024
- Preceded by: Mireille Masangu

Personal details
- Born: Léonnie Kandolo Omoyi; 29 October 1960 (age 65) Kinshasa, DR Congo
- Education: Institut des Hautes Etudes Économiques et Sociales
- Cabinet: Suminwa government

Léonnie Kandolo Omoyi (born 29 October 1960) is a Congolese human rights activist and government minister. Born in Kinshasa, she was educated in Brussels, Belgium, for most of her youth, acquiring her Bachelor's degree in management there. After returning to Zaire, she managed the family-owned printing business Impaza. She became involved in activism, joining the Catholic Lay Coordination Committee (CLC) and organizing protests against then-president Joseph Kabila in 2017–18. Crackdowns forced her into hiding for over a year until the beginning of Félix Tshisekedi's presidency in 2019. She was appointed as the tenth Minister of Gender, Family, and Children in 2024.

== Early life and education ==
Léonnie Kandolo Omoyi was born on 29 October 1960 in Kinshasa, Republic of the Congo. She is the daughter of Damien Kandolo, the first CEO of Générale Congolaise des Minerais (GECOMIN, later renamed to Gécamines). When she was three years old, she was sent to Brussels, Belgium, as a student. There, she was raised by a Belgian family, returning to the Congo for holidays. She was sent to a boarding school when she was twelve, after a car accident killed the man taking care of her and left his wife seriously injured. She returned to the Congo (later renamed Zaire) for a year to learn Lingala, returning to Brussels under the care of a French housekeeper. Kandolo obtained a Bachelor's degree in management from Institut des Hautes Etudes Économiques et Sociales in 1982, returning to the Congo thereafter.

== Career ==
In Zaire, Kandolo worked at SOZACOM for three years before moving to Lubumbashi in 1985 to manage the family-owned printing business Impaza. She was later elected vice-president of the National Association of Zairean Businesses (ANEZA) – the predecessor to the Federation of Businesses of the Congo (FEC) – for Katanga Province.

=== Activism ===
Kandolo joined the Women's International League for Peace and Freedom (WILPF) and became the executive of the Congolese women's civil society organization (CAFCO) in 2005. She moved to Kinshasa in 2008 after Impaza was sold.

Kandolo joined the Catholic Lay Coordination Committee (CLC). The CLC would go on to demand that then-president Joseph Kabila not seek a third term. Kandolo was one of the signatories of the Congolese Citizens' Manifesto "ESILI", signed in Paris, calling for the end of Kabila's rule. She helped organize CLC-led anti-Kabila demonstrations in 2017 and 2018, which were violently suppressed. After an arrest warrant was issued for Kandolo and other CLC members, she went into hiding for over a year. She came out of hiding after Kabila's departure and the beginning of Félix Tshisekedi's presidency in January 2019. She left the CLC in February 2019.

=== Politics ===
Kandolo ran as a National Assembly candidate for Katanga Province in the 2006 general election and lost.

In 2020, Kandolo was appointed to the advisory group "Exceptional Women" (French: Femmes d’exceptions), a group set up by Tshisekedi. She was appointed as the tenth Minister of Gender, Family, and Children in 2024.

== Personal life ==
Kandolo was married and had children. Her husband died whilst they were living in Lubumbashi.
