= Bellevue Kandy =

Congolese actress (born 1980)

- Born: Belinda Kikusa Kandy; October 12, 1980 (age 45); Kinshasa, Zaire (modern-day Democratic Republic of the Congo)
- Education: National Institute of Arts
- Occupations: Actress; director; producer; screenwriter
- Years active: 2010-present
- Notable work: My Brother
- Parents: Joseph Kandy (father); Luisa Nzumba Kinduelo (mother)
- Awards: Best Screenwriter of the Year, Zikomo Awards (2024)

Belinda Kikusa Kandy or Kandi (born 12 October 1980), known professionally as Bellevue Kandy, is a Congolese actress, director, producer, and screenwriter.

== Early life ==
Kandy was born on October 12, 1980, in Kinshasa, Democratic Republic of Congo. Her father, Joseph Kandy, died when she was just three months old, leaving her and her eight siblings in the care of their mother, Luisa Nzumba Kinduelo, who died in 2016.

== Career ==
Kandy studied drama at the National Institute of Arts, Kinshasa. She joined the Simba group under the leadership of Elombe Sukari, a prominent figure in Congolese theater known for his association with the Salongo movement. Groupe Simba included an ensemble of comedians and actresses, among them Yandi Mosi, Lule, Décor Ilonga, Milo (Mimie Loleka), Lea Ndaya, Ursule Peshanga, Maman Kalunga, and Bellevue.

Kandy appeared in the Ivorian television series Ma Grande Famille alongside Michel Gohou, Michel Bohiri, and Clémantine Papouet. Kandy spends her holiday season focused on providing aid and companionship to orphans and widows.

At the 2021 Nzonzing Awards for theatre and cinema, held at the Hotel Memling in Kinshasa, Kandy received the "prix de l’élite féminin", or Elite Women's Prize. In 2022, she was nominated at the Nzonzing Awards for Best Actress in Impuissance and Best Director and Best Screenplay for Famille Honorable.

Kandy and her team produce four films each month, which she shows on her YouTube channel "Bellevue TV", which has over 300,000 subscribers, as of January 2025.
