= Martin Ntenda =

Congolese politician

Member of the National Assembly
- Constituency: Kazumba Territory

Personal details
- Party: Union for the Congolese Nation

Martin Ntenda Ntenda is a Congolese politician and Union for the Congolese Nation Member of the National Assembly of the Democratic Republic of the Congo.
