= Mike Kalambay =

Congolese gospel singer-songwriter (born 1980 )

- Also known as: Mike Kalambayi
- Born: April 21, 1987 (age 39); Mbuji-Mayi, Kasaï-Oriental, Zaire (now Kasaï-Oriental, Democratic Republic of the Congo)
- Origin: Kinshasa
- Genres: Gospel music, Christian music, Spiritual music
- Occupation: Singer-songwriter
- Instrument: Vocals
- Years active: 2005–present
- Label: Kin-Express Production ‧ Gospel Records ‧ MK Prod ‧ Maajabu Gospel

Mike Kalambay Kabamuanshi (born April 21, 1980) is a Congolese gospel singer-songwriter whose origin is from Mbuji-Mayi, Democratic Republic of the Congo. Mike Kalambay also founded Shekina Music, the group that performed the songs with him from 2005 to 2023.

== Early life ==
Mike Kalambay was born in Kinshasa. His parents are Joseph Kabamuanishi and Monique Ngola. He spent his early childhood in Mbuji-Mayi. He has four siblings from his parents' union whose names are Alan, Guy, Natalie and Julie along with his 22 half siblings. His father is a polygamist and his mother is the fourth wife. Mike spent his early years singing in the youth choir.

== Career ==
In 1994, Mike was baptized at the Cité Béthel Church of the Apostle Emmanuel Mbiye, Moise Mbiye's father at the age of 16. He started his musical career by singing in a youth church choir "Les étoiles de Louange" which literally means "The stars of Praise" where he met many future Congolese gospel singers including Moise Mbiye, Sandra Mbuyi and others too. Kalambay's young talent was noticed for the first time next to Thomas Lokofe when he released two albums, "Nzambe na Eliya" and "Je lève mes yeux" in 2000. He was also featured in Marie Misamu's hit album, "Mystére du Voile - 100% Adoration" in the song "Eh Yahweh".

Kalambay launched his debut album, Jésus "mon tout" in 2005 with Jimmy's Productions, after singing for Thomas Lofoke. It was well welcomed both locally in Kinshasa and internationally, with a particular hit, Ngolu. The record was a commercial success for him, and he was nominated for Ndule Awards for his work. From this album, the group Shekina Music was born. With Shekina Music, Kalambay released his 2nd album, "1 jour... (lit. "One day...")", in 2007, being produced by Kin-Express Productions. This album also featured the future singer Sandra Mbuyi and was the lead singer for the track "Kumama Yahwe". In 2008, Shekina Music, with Kalambay, toured for the first time in France at the LSC hall on 144 Av. du Président Wilson, Saint-Denis, Île-de-France.

In 2009, Mike Kalambay and Shekina Music released another album with Kin-Express Productions, "Dans Ta Présence Vol. 1". The album was another success with other hits including Bonganga, Nsenda, and Mokonzi Na Nga. A few months later on December 5, Mike Kalambay and Shekina Music toured in Lubumbashi to perform live with their greatest hits. Three years later, Volume 2 of Dans Ta Présence was released with songs such as Mal a L'aise and Ma Louange where released.

In 2014, Kalambay left Kin-Express Productions and made his own, MK Productions. With this new company he released a new album with Shekina Music, "Je suis une Étoile" the same year. In 2017, Kalambay hosted the Mike Kalambay Concert Boat Ride on July 14. In 2019, Mike Kalambay released "Mon avocat" and was nominated for the Ndule Awards and the 50th anniversary of The Churches of Revival. In 2020, he released his top single, "C'est ton jour" in July. He soon after became an ambassador at the Maajabu Gospel record label.

== Personal life ==
In 2013, Mike Kalambay married his ex wife, Penielle Nsamba Kalambay (née Tshibasu). The couple has two children, a boy born in 2015 and a second boy born in 2019. After six years of marriage, the couple separated in 2019. His ex wife moved the children back to Texas and in 2020, returned the bride price and began the process of divorce. In 2022, the divorce was legally finalized after a 3 year custody battle. Mike Kalambay shares joint physical custody of the children with his ex wife.

== Awards and nominations ==
| Year | Event | Prize | Result | Ref |
|---|---|---|---|---|
| 2008 | Ndule Awards | Best African Gospel Artist | Won | |
| 2009 | Ndule Awards | Best African Gospel Artist | Nominated | |
| 2019 | The Churches of Revival | Best Gospel Artist | Nominated | |
| 2022 | Ghana National Gospel Music Awards | African Artist of the Year | Nominated | |
| 2023 | Afrimma | Best Gospel | Won | |
| 2024 | Mundi Music Awards | Male Artist of the Year | Nominated | |
| 2024 | Mundi Music Awards | Collaboration of the Year (Bisengo ya Lola) | Nominated | |
| 2024 | Mundi Music Awards | Song of the Year (Bisengo ya Lola) | Nominated | |
| 2024 | Mundi Music Awards | Album of the Year (Dieu en toute circonstance) | Nominated | |

== Discography ==
=== Albums ===
- 2005: Jesus mon "tout"
- 2007: 1 jour...
- 2009: Dans Ta Presence Vol. 1
- 2012: Dans Ta Presence Vol. 2
- 2016/5: Je suis une Étoile
- 2018: Kumama
- 2019: Mon Avocat
- 2023: Dieu en toute circonstance

=== Live albums ===
- 2009: Mega Célébration
- 2013: Live Acoustics Dans Ta Presence
- 2024: Explo Célébration
- 2024: Live Zénith de Paris

=== Singles and Eps ===
- 2019: Congo Uni
- 2020: C'est ton jour
- 2021: Molongi (ft. Team Balongi)
- 2024: Posa ya Yesu (ft. NK Divine)

=== Live tours ===
- Maximum Celebration (Lubumbashi on 13 November 2017)
- Concert Boat Ride (Cincinnati on 14 July 2017)
