= Choc Stars =

Soukous band from the Democratic Republic of the Congo

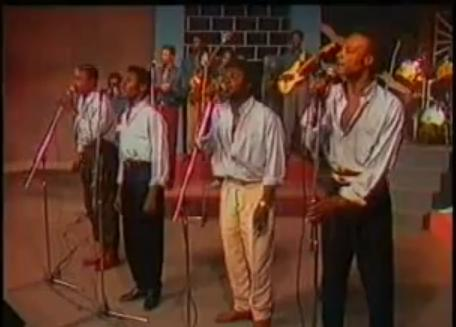
Choc Stars in concert in Kinshasa in 1986

The Choc Stars are a soukous band from the Democratic Republic of the Congo. The band was founded in 1983 by Ben Nyamabo, and has since published over 50 albums. The apex of their success was in the 1980s, when guitarist and vocalist Bozi Boziana wrote some of their most appreciated hits, such as Sandu Kotti, Alena, Mbuta-Mutu, and Retrouvailles a Paris. When Boziana left to create his own ensemble, three singers were hired to replace him (Carlito Lassa, Dieka Debaba e Defao Matumona). Many other talented Congolese musicians have joined the Choc Stars over the years; some of them are Roxy Tshimpaka, Djuna Djanana, Monza Premier, Nzola Ndonga, Nzaya Nzayadio, Zemano Germain Kanza, Djo Mali, Carrol Makamba, Teddy Accompa, Wajery Lema, Ditutala Kuama and Djudjuchet. Most of these were coming from (or would later move to) other prominent soukous bands such as Zaiko Langa Langa, Langa Langa Stars, Orchestre Big Stars, OK Jazz, Zaïko Nkolo Mboka and others.

Despite a decline in popularity of Choc Stars in the 1990s, Nyamabo managed to keep the band together, and some of the albums recorded in this period, such as Dernier Metro and Bango Oyo Baye, received much critical praise.

== Partial discography ==
- Les Merveilles du Passe - Choc Stars - Vol.3
- Munduki Elelo
- Bakuke
- Laisser Passer
- Dernier Metro
- Bango Oyo Baye
- Awa et Ben - 2nd shock
- Retrouvailles à Paris Vols. 1-4
