= Jackie Shako Diala Anahengo =

Congolese actress (1958–2021)

- Born: 23 August 1958; Sankuru, Belgian Congo
- Died: 15 June 2021 (aged 62); Kinshasa, Democratic Republic of the Congo
- Occupation: Actress

Jackie Shako Diala Anahengo (23 August 1958 – 15 June 2021) was a Congolese actress. She appeared on Radio-Télévision nationale congolaise, as well as on the theatrical stage.
