= National Institute of Arts, Kinshasa =

Institute in Kinshasa, Democratic Republic of the Congo

- l'Institut National des Arts
- Former names: National Conservatory of Music and Dramatic Arts
- Established: 1 December 1967
- Director: Lema Kusa
- Location: Kinshasa, Democratic Republic of the Congo

The National Institute of Arts, Kinshasa (l'Institut National des Arts or INA) is a higher educational institution that provides training to performance artists in Kinshasa, Democratic Republic of the Congo.

The INA was established on 1 December 1967, at first called the National Conservatory of Music and Dramatic Arts (Conservatoire National de Musique et d’Arts Dramatiques). The objective was to discover national cultural identities through intangible heritages such as music.

In September 2009 it was reported that the building that housed the Institute had been sold to a South African company. The Ministry of Higher Education was negotiating with the new owners to let the institute remain in the building. In February 2012 the minister of Higher Education and Universities, Léonard Mashako Mamba, said the government would give the Institute part of the site of the Institute of Agricultural Technology in Mombele. The government would build a campus with auditoriums, houses, a sports complex and administrative offices.

Until recently the Director General was the graphic artist and painter Lema Kusa. As of March 2012 the Director General was Yoka Lye Mudaba. He was responsible for arranging for students of the institute to perform the anthem for the 14th summit of the Organisation internationale de la Francophonie in Kinshasa that month. The 45th anniversary celebrations were held at "The Zoo" cultural center in Kinshasa in February 2012. The planned festivities included conferences, exhibitions, music and choreography.
