= Music industry and copyright in the Democratic Republic of the Congo =

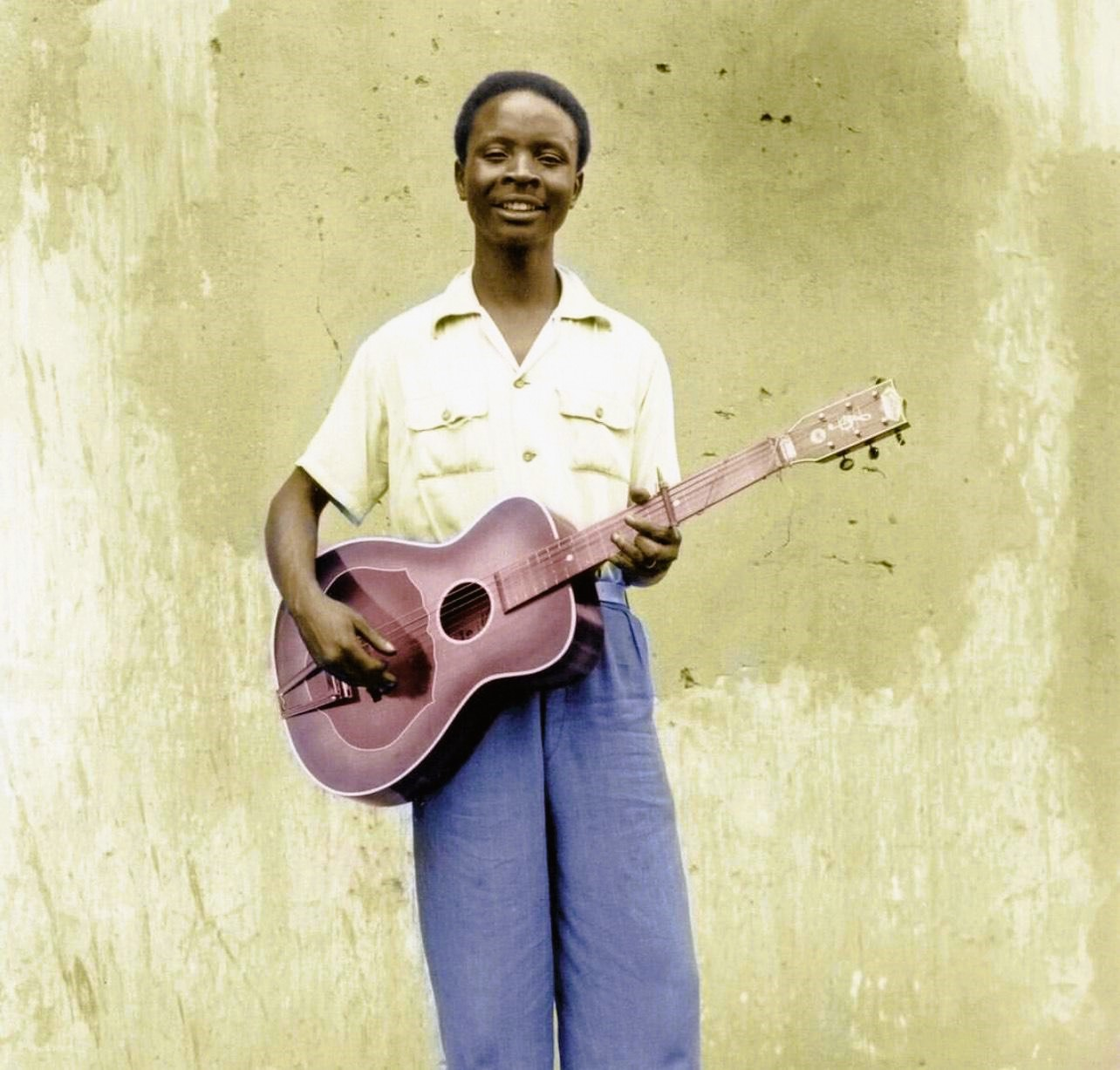
Jean Bosco Mwenda performing in Katanga, Belgian Congo, in 1952

The music industry and copyright in the Democratic Republic of the Congo trace their origins to the late 1940s, when Léopoldville (now Kinshasa) became the central hub of phonographic production in Central Africa. Beginning in 1947 with the establishment of the first record labels such as Olympia, Ngoma, Opika, Loningisa, CEFA (Compagnie d'Énregistrements Folkloriques Africains), and Editions Esengo, the city attracted musicians from across the Congo and neighboring territories who recorded songs later pressed in Brussels. These early years saw the emergence of modern Congolese music from its folkloric roots, with pioneering figures such as Antoine Kasongo Kitenge, Antoine Wendo Kolosoy, Henri Bowane, Jean Bosco Mwenda, and Joseph Athanase Tshamala Kabasele (widely known as Le Grand Kallé), who laid the groundwork for Congolese rumba and the country's urban popular music.

During the colonial period, musicians worked under exclusive long-term contracts with Greek and Belgian publishers, who retained control over mechanical and authors' rights. Until the early 1950s, copyright laws were virtually unknown, and artists received only fixed payments for their recordings. The arrival of the SABAM (Société Belge des Auteurs et des Compositeurs) office in Léopoldville in 1953 introduced formal mechanisms for royalty collection and distribution, leading Congolese musicians such as Augustin Moniania "Roitelet", Le Grand Kallé, and Roger Izeidi to join the organization despite opposition from foreign publishers. Efforts to defend musicians' rights intensified with the creation of the Syndicat des Artistes Musiciens Congolais (SAMUCO) in 1956, followed by subsequent unions such as SYNAMCO, UMUZA, and UMUCO, which advocated for better working conditions and the cancellation of restrictive contracts. After Congo's independence in 1960, local musicians gained the freedom to establish their own labels, beginning with Le Grand Kallé's Surboum African Jazz, which inaugurated a new era of Congolese-owned record production. Throughout the following decades, the Congolese music industry continued to expand, accompanied by evolving structures for copyright management. Institutions such as SONECA (1969), SONOCA, and later SOCODA (2011) were created to administer authors' and neighboring rights.

== Colonial record labels ==
British music historian Gary Stewart notes that the commercial recording of local musicians in Léopoldville (present-day Kinshasa) began under the initiative of Belgian entrepreneur Fernand Janssens, who arrived in the Belgian Congo after World War II equipped with recording technology and the goal of producing records to be mastered and pressed by his Belgium-based company, SOBEDI. In 1947, Janssens founded the Belgian Congo's first record label, Les Éditions Olympia, which was managed by retired Belgian army officer Mr. Patou. Numerous recordings were released under Olympia and its Congolese subsidiaries, Kongo Bina and Lomeka. It was through Olympia that the romantic vocalist Souleymane Manoka, popularly known as "De Saio", a star of the "Boeck Park", celebrated for his emotion-driven singing. The son of a Senegalese father, De Saio recorded either with his own ensemble or alongside artists such as singer Robert Weye, guitarist Antoine Wendo Kolosoy, and orchestras including Orchestre Odéon Kinois, Orchestre Siluvangi, Kin Jazz, and Orchestre Victoria Kin.

In 1948, Greek entrepreneur Nico Jeronimidis established Ngoma, which became the most influential label of its time. Ngoma recorded over 4,500 songs, many of which were never commercially released, while others were later entrusted to UNESCO. Initially dedicated to preserving African folk traditions, Ngoma gradually shifted its focus toward modern Congolese music. The song "Marie Louise", performed by Wendo Kolosoy and Henri Bowane, became a cultural milestone that symbolized the revival of Bantu identity. The following year, in 1949, South African label Gallotone sent ethnomusicologist Hugh Tracey to Katanga Province to record traditional artists such as Jean Bosco Mwenda, composer of the 1952 hit "Masanga", alongside Patrice Ilunga, Losta Abelco, and Edouard Masengo. Their 78 rpm discs found widespread success in both Élisabethville (present-day Lubumbashi) and Léopoldville. That same year, Belgian Jewish brothers the Benatars founded the Kina label, renamed Opika in 1950, which went on to oversee African Jazz, Léopoldville's first major modern music band, established in 1953 by Joseph Athanase Tshamala Kabasele, known as Le Grand Kallé.

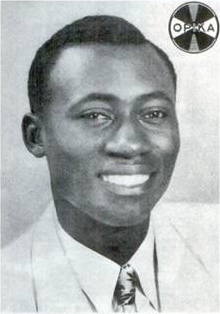
Promotional photo of Le Grand Kallé for the Opika record label in the early 1950s

In 1950, Greek brothers Basile and Athanase Papadimitriou founded Loningisa, which attracted numerous gifted musicians from both sides of the Congo River. Its most prominent band, OK Jazz, was formed in 1956 and later led by Franco Luambo, whose leadership came to define the bond between the two Congos.

In 1953, Belgian guitarist Guillaume "Bill" Alexandre created the Compagnie d'Enregistrement du Folklore Africain (CEFA). He introduced the electric guitar to the Congo and helped launch the careers of several future stars, including Roger Izeidi, Vicky Longomba, Augustin Moniania "Roitelet", Franco Luambo, Paul "Bemi" Kossi, Antoine "Brazzos" Armando, Guy-Léon Fylla, and Marcelle Ebibi. In 1956, Greek producer Dino Antonopoulos founded Éditions Esengo on the ashes of the defunct Opika label. As with Ngoma and Loningisa, Henri Bowane played a crucial role at Esengo, collaborating with Jean Serge Essous, Nino Malapet, Le Grand Kallé, and Philippe Lando Rossignol to establish the rumba-rock style that defined the era. The immense success of Malapet's Rock-a-Mambo, Paul Ebengo Dewayon's Conga Jazz, and Le Grand Kallé's African Jazz symbolized the pinnacle of the golden age of modern Congolese music.

=== Membership and contracts ===
Between 1947 and 1953, musicians who joined these recording labels were subject to strict membership requirements and legal obligations. Artists were required to sign exclusive contracts lasting between five and ten years, which were validated by the Belgian colonial authority of the territorial administration. Musicians generally fell into two categories: performers, who often sang their own compositions, and performer-instrumentalists, who provided instrumental accompaniment for solo artists or groups during studio sessions.

Remuneration varied from label to label but generally included royalties (a percentage of each record sold), session fees and bonuses for studio work or mechanical rights, and additional benefits such as access to credit for acquiring material goods like bicycles, motorcycles, cars, refrigerators, and even homes. Many artists obtained housing through the National Housing Office (Office national de logement; ONL), particularly in the Yolo-Nord and Yolo-Sud quartiers of Kalamu, Léopoldville, with purchase costs spread through credit systems.

=== Copyrights ===
Copyright protection was largely nonexistent. Greek publishers in particular refused to recognize or discuss the concept of author's rights. However, the growing success of Congolese recordings soon attracted the attention of SABAM (Société Belge des Auteurs et des Compositeurs). In 1953, SABAM opened an office in Léopoldville with jurisdiction over the Belgian Congo, Rwanda, and Urundi (now Burundi). The branch, directed by Ector Fraink Courtain, employed a secretary-dactylographer, Le Grand Kallé, and several assistants. The office's mission included collecting royalties from music users, gathering programs of performed works, and distributing the corresponding payments to authors and composers. It operated through two departments, one for collection and one for distribution. In addition to his clerical role, Le Grand Kallé was tasked with raising awareness among Congolese musicians about joining SABAM, a mission he pursued with the help of Roitelet. Greek publishers opposed this initiative and encouraged musicians not to affiliate with SABAM, except for Bill Alexandre, who allowed his artists to join. Among the first members were Izeidi, Brazzos, Vicky, Bemi, and Roitelet. Roitelet became the leader of the SABAM membership movement in 1953, and passionately convincing musicians to register and explaining how royalty systems worked. His advocacy led to numerous sign-ups, including Antoine Moundanda and several Ngoma label artists.

At the end of the first royalty distribution campaign, which collected reproduction rights from bars, restaurants, cinemas, hotels, and radio stations, musicians were astonished by the large sums distributed, far exceeding the flat-rate payments previously received. The introduction of royalties and authors' rights brought great satisfaction to artists but provoked resentment among the Greek and Belgian publishers, who were displeased with the growing financial independence of their signed musicians.

As the SABAM movement gained strength, the Opika label sought to regain control in 1955 by compelling its artists to join SABAM under the condition that all copyrights, mechanical rights, and royalties be transferred to the company in exchange for fixed monthly salaries. This system functioned temporarily but was soon condemned by the Artists' Union, as it violated the principle of individual ownership of creative works and was therefore illegal. In 1956, Roitelet, now a key union figure, organized the first large-scale musicians' strike in Léopoldville, targeting the Loningisa label. The strike protested the publisher's refusal to allow his artists to join SABAM and demanded improved living and working conditions. The movement severely disrupted Loningisa's production schedule, notably delaying several planned recordings by Franco Luambo. Papadimitriou subsequently filed a complaint with Mr. Capelle, the Belgian territorial administrator, accusing the strikers of contract violations. Roitelet and his fellow leaders, including Nino Malapet, Franco, Pandi, Paul Ebengo Dewayon, Essous, and Henriot, a Belgian saxophonist who supported their cause, were summoned before the colonial court located near the present-day Stade des Martyrs (Pont Cabu area). During the proceedings, the musicians voiced their grievances, and although Mr. Capelle recognized the validity of their concerns, he condemned the strike and encouraged peaceful negotiation. The dispute concluded with Papadimitriou agreeing to raise salaries and bonuses and to permit membership in SABAM, which then marked a pivotal step in acknowledging musicians' rights and establishing stronger intellectual property protections in Congolese music.

=== Creation of SAMUCO ===
In the wake of these events, the leaders who had organized the strike decided to create a permanent organization to defend artists' interests. In 1956, they founded SAMUCO (Syndicat des Artistes et Musiciens Congolais), chaired by Roitelet. The union aimed to ensure fair treatment, protect contracts, and advocate for musicians' welfare. In 1958, SAMUCO made its first official contact with the Belgian colonial administration. Delegates Roitelet and Paul Mwanga met Governor-General Léon Pétillon Cornelis to demand the cancellation of the ten-year contracts that Congolese musicians had signed with publishers in Léopoldville. The Governor-General approved the request in principle, recommending a three-year transition period with the measure taking effect in 1960, ironically, the year of Congo's independence.

After independence, SAMUCO, with strong backing from Franco Luambo, redirected its efforts toward Congo's Minister of Foreign Affairs, Justin Marie Bomboko, who successfully pressured Greek publishers to cancel all decade-long contracts signed with Congolese artists.

== Post-independence ==
=== Creation of the first Congolese record labels ===
The termination of exclusive contracts between Congolese musicians and foreign publishers granted artists full ownership of their works and opened the door to the establishment of the first record labels owned by Congolese themselves. Leading this transformation was Le Grand Kallé, who founded Surboum African Jazz in 1960, the first instance of a Congolese musician independently managing a recording and publishing company. Supported financially by Édition Congolaise du Disque (ECODIS) and through international collaborations with Decca Records and Fonior, Kallé launched his label while attending the Belgo-Congolese Round Table Conference in Brussels, where Congo's independence was being negotiated. During his stay in Brussels, he also recorded several pieces with Cameroonian saxophonist Manu Dibango. The founding of Surboum African enabled Le Grand Kallé to produce and distribute recordings for other orchestras, including OK Jazz in 1961. During their trip to Brussels under the Surboum African Jazz label, OK Jazz recorded a series of successful titles such as "Amida Muziki Ya OK", "Nabanzi Zozo", "Maria de mi vida", "Motema ya fafa", and others. The profits generated from these records allowed OK Jazz to acquire new musical instruments. From the early 1960s onward, a wave of new local record labels emerged, run either by musicians or private entrepreneurs, such as Epanza Makita, Éditions Populaires, Eve, La Musette, ISA, Vita, Londende, Macquis, Parions, Mamaky, Boboto, Super Contact, among others. Additional labels such as Boma Bango, Stenco, Flash, Tcheza, Covadia, Viva, Musikake, Tivoli, Paka Siwe, and Sansacion soon followed.

In 1971, Verckys Kiamuangana Mateta altered the way records were produced by launching "Mfumbwa 1st" and "Mfumbwa 2nd", which split a 45 rpm record into two sections: one for melody and one for dance, rather than the usual two songs. This new format was quickly adopted by other musicians and is credited with transforming the Congolese music industry, as it was the only industry globally to release records with just one song per side instead of two. Through Éditions Vévé Internationale, Verckys later established Industrie Zaïroise du Son (IZASON) in the early 1980s. The company operated a 32-track studio, pressed records locally in Kinshasa, and produced album covers in-house at its Kintambo-Cimetière facilities.

=== Decline of domestic phonographic and the rise of foreign dominance ===
The Zairean Record Manufacturing Company (Manufacture Zaïroise du Disque; Mazadis), a pressing plant located on 13th Street in Limete, Kinshasa, was originally founded around 1955 as Macodis (Manufacture Congolaise du Disque) by Eugène Willy Pelgrims de Bigard, head of Fonior. When the country changed its name from the Republic of the Congo to Zaire in 1971, Macodis was renamed Mazadis and was nationalized as part of President Mobutu Sese Seko's authenticité campaigns. As the only pressing plant in Zaire, it produced about 1 million records annually. In 1974, ownership was transferred to Franco Luambo, who was a close associate of Mobutu, but due to management challenges, Pelgrims de Bigard returned under a 60-40% partnership. Mazadis maintained a monopoly over record production but could not modernize due to inflation and economic instability, relying on outdated technology and lacking the equipment for high-quality stereo records. In 1978, the state requested Fonior to reclaim the factory, but Fonior refused. Eventually, Fonior went bankrupt in 1983, and its catalog was sold to SonoDisc.

Record companies are often reluctant to invest in unknown artists, but they respond swiftly once they realize they have overlooked a significant success. A common strategy is the creation of subsidiary or "underwater" labels to quickly sign artists they previously ignored. At this stage, competition among record companies becomes intense, and smaller, financially weaker labels struggle to compete with established firms, sometimes being absorbed by them. In the Democratic Republic of the Congo, major labels such as Ngoma and Fonior eventually came under SonoDisc's control. Ngoma recordings distributed through Fonior in the 1960s were taken over by SonoDisc in the 1970s. Nevertheless, a handful of labels managed to retain their independence, including Éditions Vévé Internationale with artistic director Dizzy Mandjeku; Les Editions Populaires of Franco; the Générale des Industries du Disque Africain; Génidia of Tabu Ley Rochereau; and Production Zaïko Langa Langa (Prozal). In the late 1980s and early 1990s, numerous new labels emerged in France and the U.K., such as Pathé Marconi, Celluloid Records, Tchica Tchica, Tangent, Edison, Safari Ambiance (a Sonodisc sublabel), Salsa Music, Syllart Production, Authentic Music, Black Music, Afric Music, Déclic, Mélodia, BH Électronique, Rythmes et Musique, Sonima Music, and Simon Music. These companies oversaw Congolese imprints including Clarys Music, Socrate Music, Alamoule, Bondowe, Ndiaye Production, Globe Music, Rigo Makengo Production, Dadi Production, and others.

The disappearance of national Congolese record labels such as Parions, Don Dass, and Molende Kwi Kwi, combined with the bankruptcy of Mazadis, Sophinza, and Izason (all established in 1984) and the broader transition from vinyl to compact disc, left domestic production severely diminished. Foreign labels specializing in African and Caribbean repertoires subsequently dominated the market, beginning with SonoDisc, Next Music, and Sonima. Other African-based labels—such as Syllart Productions and N'Diaye Enterprises (Senegal); Anytha Ngapy Production, Tamaris, and IAD (Congo-Brazzaville); and Simon Music S.I.P.E. and JPS Productions (Cameroon)—also capitalized on Congolese music's commercial appeal. In 1998, JPS Productions, owned by Cameroonian Jean-Pierre Saah, became a major force by producing leading Congolese artists. For five years, it worked with bands from Kinshasa and Brazzaville, but when the company collapsed, bands such as Zaïko Langa Langa, Cultur'A Pays-Vie of Félix Wazekwa, and Wenge Musica Maison Mère were left without producers. Local labels, including Clarys Music, B. Mas Production, Baby Production, Alamoule, Socrate Music, and others, were unable to counter this foreign dominance. In the 2000s, labels such as Fula Ngenge (Senegalese-owned, based in Brazzaville) and Obouo Productions re-entered the market and collaborated with high-profile artists such as Fally Ipupa and JB Mpiana. Meanwhile, the Paris-based Congolese-owned Diego Music remains the most prominent label continuing Congolese music production abroad, while Kin-Express Productions serves religious musicians but struggles to attract international visibility. Confronted with these structural limitations, several leading musicians, including Félix Wazekwa and Koffi Olomide, turned to self-production. The Wazekwa Foundation (FOWA), for instance, mobilized approximately $50,000 to self-finance the album Adamu Na Eva, not including the additional expenses for music videos, mastering in France, and duplication in Germany.

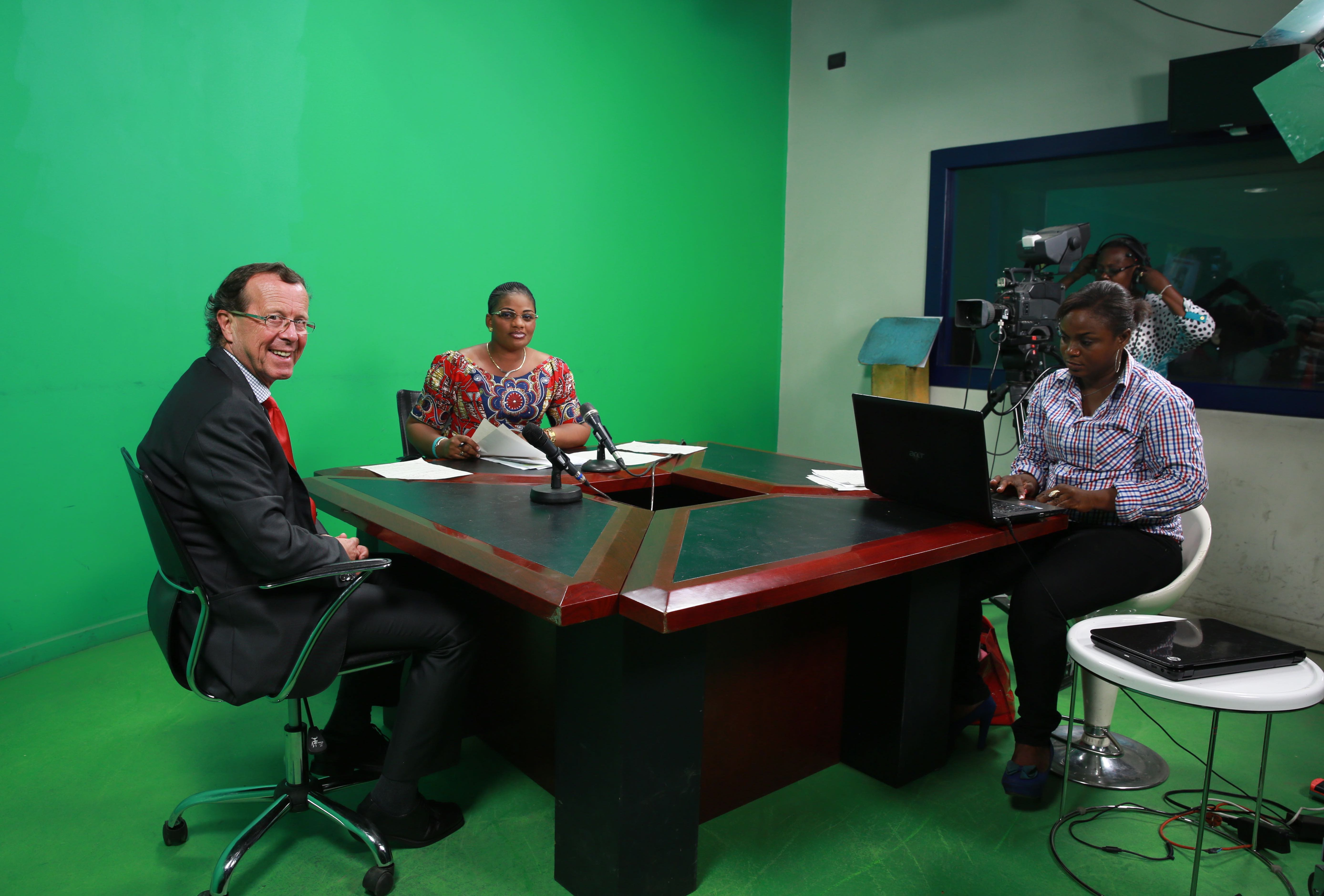
Martin Kobler, Special Representative of the UN Secretary-General and head of MONUSCO, in the studio of the Radio-Télévision nationale congolaise (RTNC) in Kinshasa

Until the 1980s, and before the collapse of Mazadis and the Phonographic and Industrial Company of Zaïre (Société Phonographique et Industrielle du Zaïre; Sophinza), the country was able to export music pressed domestically. The Democratic Republic of the Congo now imports its own music, pressed in Paris in the form of CDs and video formats, with consumers paying customs duties on works originally authored by Congolese artists. The broader cultural environment remains unfavorable to the development of a competitive recording industry. Most production facilities operate privately, and only a small number of Kinshasa studios, primarily M'Eko Sound, N'Diaye Studio, and Vévé Studio, meet internationally recognized standards. The compound of the Congolese National Radio and Television (Radio-Télévision nationale congolaise; RTNC) hosts five major studios: PSPH, Maximedias, SABAB, Zola Tempo, and Souzy Kasseya, all equipped with professional acoustic installations. The principal facility among them is the training studio of the Congolese Institute of Audiovisual Media (Institut Congolais de l'Audiovisuel et du Multimédia, ICA), originally dedicated to training RTNC staff but now accessible to private users for commercial recording and technical training. Most of these studios, which became operational in the 1990s, transitioned to digital systems. M'Eko Sound was rebuilt as a fully digital studio after a 2008 fire and 2010 rehabilitation, whereas PSPH and Nouvelle Duplication (popularly known as N'Diaye Studio) continue to operate in analog and digital formats.

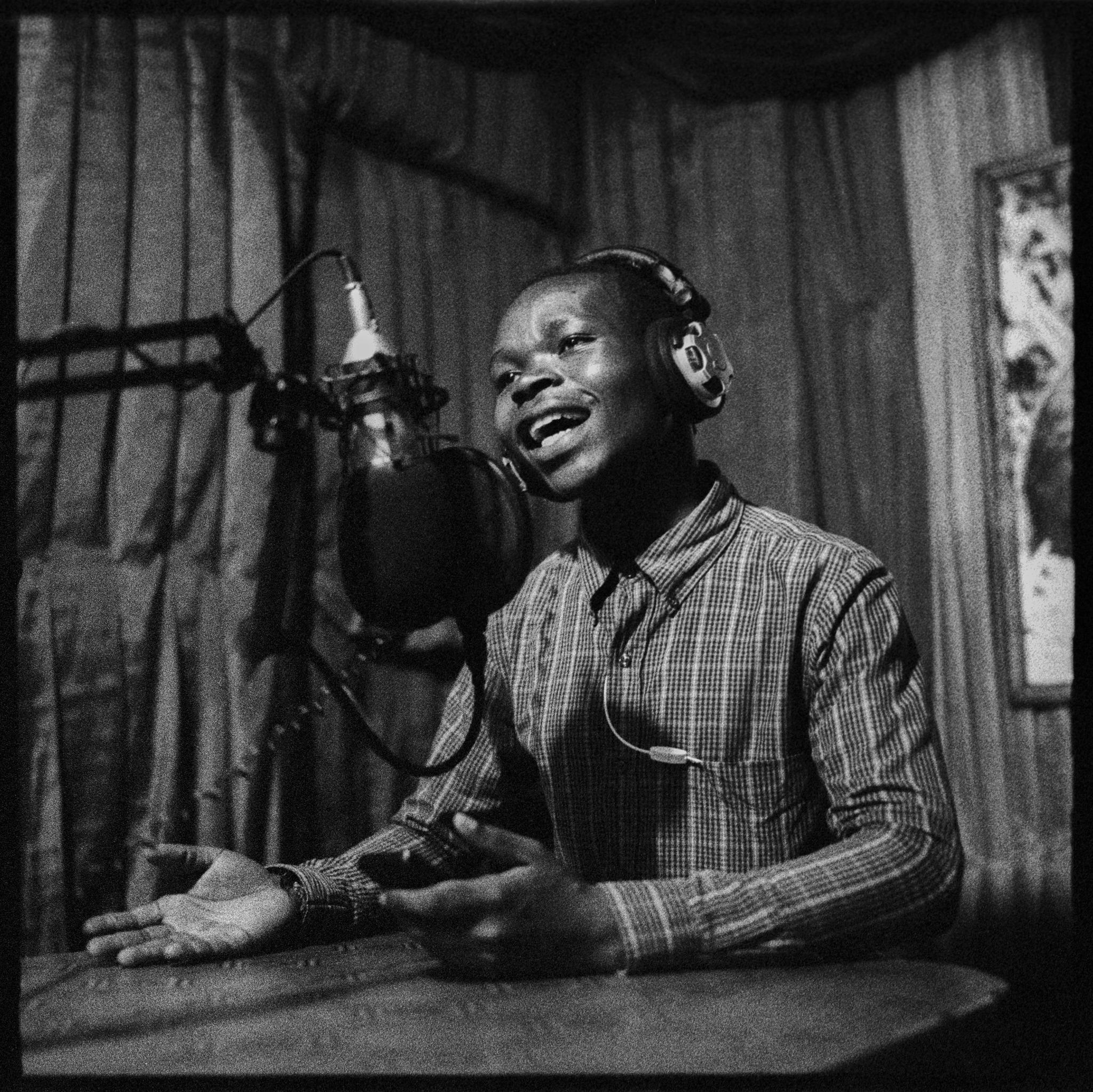
Espoir Ngalukiye, a community organizer, non-violent activist with the LUCHA movement, and computer scientist, in the studio of Radio Télévision Communautaire Taina (RTCT) in Goma

Technical limitations persist, as many Congolese studios are not equipped to record African traditional instruments and therefore rely on pre-programmed samples imported from Western libraries. Professionally trained sound engineers remain scarce in Kinshasa and nationwide. Most technicians begin as musicians or singers, some trained at the National Institute of Arts (INA), or as electronics technicians who later transition into audio engineering; others are self-taught after apprenticeships as studio assistants. The rehabilitated ICA studio, established with French support and accessible to private clients, provides a venue for improved professional development. In addition, the Belgian organization Music Fund, in cooperation with producer Vincent Kenis, offered a two-year training program for sound engineers in Kinshasa, modeled on similar initiatives implemented in Mozambique.

Piracy remains pervasive due to weak customs enforcement at borders and insufficient policing within the country. Counterfeit MP4 discs, primarily imported from China, are sold openly alongside legal formats. A single official CD or DVD sent abroad can result in an entire container of pirated copies being shipped back to Kinshasa. The most dangerous form of piracy derives from MP3 and MP4 software, which allows an entire catalogue of artists to be stored on a single inexpensive device. Meanwhile, the market for mobile phone ringback tones, controlled by multinational telecommunications companies that charge subscribers about $0.30 per month while withholding royalties legally owed to artists, also erodes the industry's revenue base. Authors who detect such fraud often lodge complaints directly and typically receive only ad hoc compensation.

=== The defense of musicians' interests ===
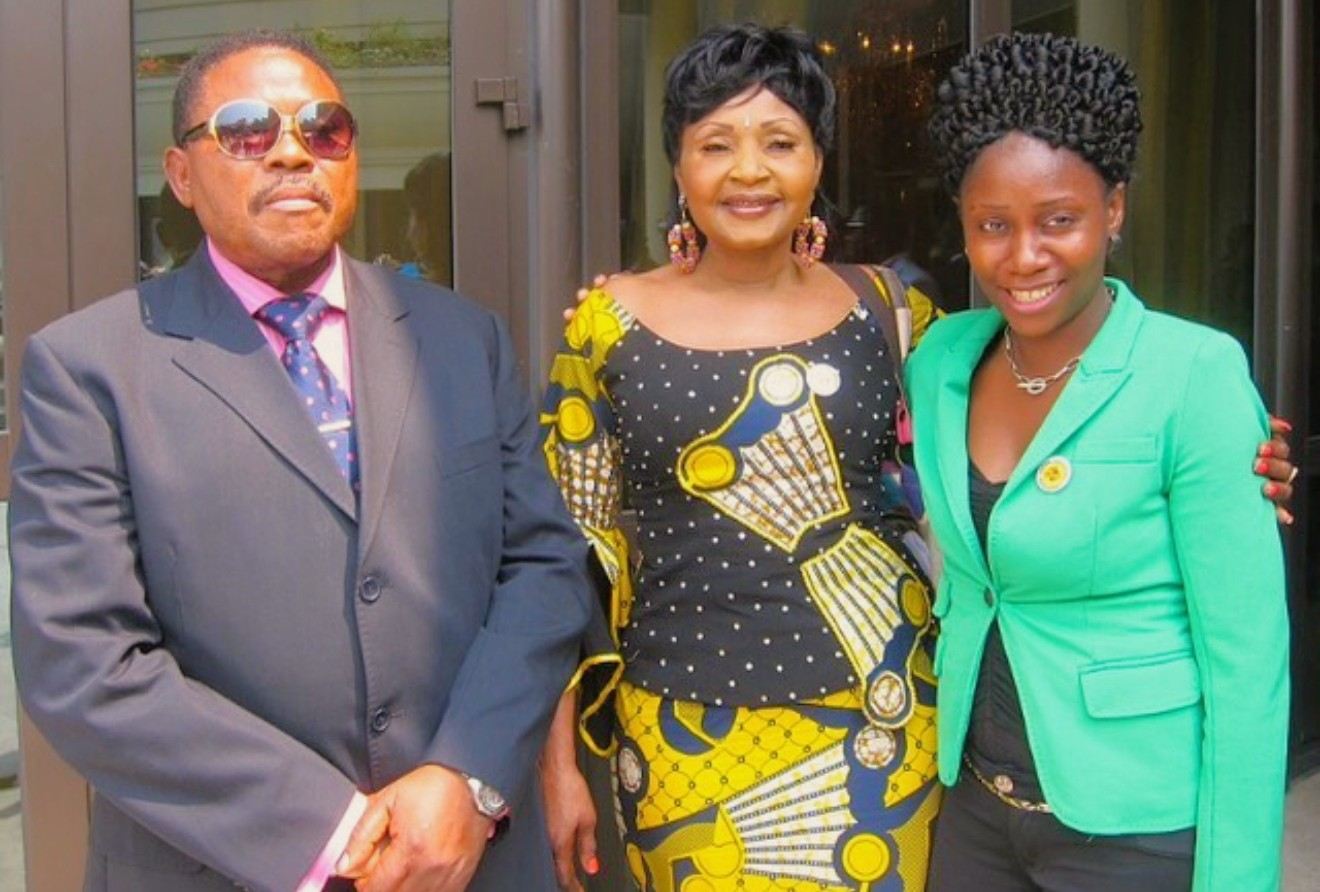
Verckys Kiamuangana Mateta with Mbilia Bel (center) in May 2019

The campaign to defend Congolese musicians' rights developed through a series of successive organizations. The first and most significant of these was SAMUCO (Syndicat des Artistes Musiciens Congolais), created in 1956 under the leadership of Roitelet, which laid the groundwork for future bodies seeking to improve the professional and legal recognition of artists. SAMUCO was later replaced by SYNAMCO (Syndicat National des Artistes et Musiciens Congolais), also led by Roitelet for several years. During the Zairianization era, it was transformed into UMUZA (Union des Musiciens Zaïrois), and following the fall of Mobutu Sese Seko, it became UMUCO (Union des Musiciens Congolais). Leadership of UMUCO changed hands over time, notably including Vicky and Verckys Kiamuangana Mateta, the latter becoming a major figure in promoting musicians' rights and their financial independence. Additional associations also appeared, such as AMCB (Association des Musiciens Congolais de Belgique), which represented diaspora musicians, and RAMUC (Rassemblement des Artistes Musiciens Congolais), founded in reaction to UMUCO's inactivity.

The government created SONECA (Société Nationale des Éditeurs et Auteurs Congolais) in 1969 to manage and regulate authors' rights at the national level. However, over the years, the institution became increasingly ineffective due to administrative mismanagement and persistent internal conflicts, which disrupted the distribution of cultural royalties. The establishment of the Cultural Promotion Fund, operating under SONECA's authority, also worsened divisions within the organization, eventually leading to its collapse and replacement by SONOCA. Seeking to modernize copyright administration, the government later introduced the Société Congolaise des Droits d'Auteurs et des Droits Voisins (SOCODA) through Ordinance No. 11/022 of 18 March 2011. Recognized as a cooperative society, SOCODA assumed responsibility for managing copyrights and neighboring rights throughout the Democratic Republic of the Congo. Nonetheless, internal crises soon undermined its functioning. On 13 November 2019, after a prolonged period of dysfunction, its Board Chairman, Kiamuangana Mateta, tendered his resignation following years of conflict and financial mismanagement. In the aftermath, two commissions were established to organize an extraordinary general assembly and to reform SOCODA's governing statutes.

=== Sponsorships and partnerships ===
Sponsorship and corporate partnerships are common ways musicians receive financial support in the Congolese music industry. It is relatively common for musicians or groups to collaborate with companies, particularly mobile telecommunications firms, as well as with government institutions through arrangements such as the national protocol governing official ceremonies. Although these agreements are less widespread, some individual artists and groups also enter into contracts with companies to act as brand ambassadors, linking their names and public identities to corporate brands, or to perform at corporate events, including parties, product launches, inaugurations, and other functions.

For instance, in October 2009, Fally Ipupa promoted products belonging to the brewing company Bracongo. Ferré Gola obtained a sponsorship agreement with Bralima's Primus beer brand in the DRC in 2006. Two years later, in 2008, he released a two-track CD featuring the ndombolo-inspired song "Lubukulukumu", created for Primus. Between 20 and 22 June 2014, Bralima sponsored the Primus Fête de la Musique as part of its efforts to promote Primus. The event, held at the Théâtre de Verdure de Mont Ngaliema, brought together prominent Congolese musicians, including Werrason, JB Mpiana, Jossart N'Yoka Longo, Ferré Gola, and Shakelewa.

Music groups can also earn money by performing at political events. During election campaigns, they are often hired to entertain people at rallies. Artists may likewise be hired to support awareness campaigns conducted by health agencies and organizations addressing social concerns, including corruption, environmental degradation, deforestation, and poaching. Mobile telecommunications companies also pay musicians when their songs are used as ringtones on their services.

== National legal framework ==
The Constitution of the Democratic Republic of the Congo explicitly guarantees the protection of intellectual and artistic property. Article 46 states:

"The right to culture, the freedom of intellectual and artistic creation, and of scientific and technological research are guaranteed, provided that the law, public order, and morality are respected. Copyright and intellectual property rights are guaranteed and protected by law".

This article affirms the constitutional commitment to protecting intellectual property and copyright, while assigning the practical implementation of these protections to specific laws.

=== Ordinance-Law No. 86-033 of 5 April 1986 ===
Ordinance-Law No. 86-033 of 5 April 1986 concerns the protection of copyright and related rights. Enacted on the same date, this law comprises 113 articles and provides a comprehensive legal framework to safeguard creators' rights, ensuring they benefit from their intellectual efforts. It clearly defines the concepts of "copyright" and "related rights" and clarifies the extent of the legal protection afforded to authors.

==== Copyright provisions ====
Articles 1 to 82 cover general provisions related to artistic creation. They define the author as "the person whose name or pseudonym appears on a disclosed work", and extend protection to all forms of literary and artistic expression. Articles 17 to 32 specify the exclusive rights granted to creators, while Articles 33 to 82 regulate the transfer and exploitation of economic rights, which must always be recorded in writing.

==== Transfer and exploitation of rights ====
Authors retain the exclusive right to exploit or assign their works. Any transfer, whether partial or total, free or paid, must be formalized in writing. Blanket assignments of future works are null and void, protecting artists from exploitative contracts that could strip them of control over their future creations.

==== Related rights ====
Articles 83 to 95 introduce related rights, which extend legal protection to performers, phonogram producers, and broadcasting organizations. This ensures that composers, lyricists, interpreters, and producers benefit from legal safeguards when their works are used, reproduced, or distributed.

==== Rights of distribution, exploitation, and assignment ====
Although not explicitly codified in Congolese law, the right of distribution, derived from Articles 36(4) and 99 of Ordinance-Law No. 86-033, is interpreted as the exclusive right to authorize or prohibit the public distribution of physical copies of a work. This allows authors to control how and where their creations enter the market. The WIPO Copyright Treaty, in Article 6(1), also confirms this right by granting authors control over the public availability of their works through sale or ownership transfer. However, the treaty's scope does not extend to online distribution, leaving digital rights somewhat ambiguous in the Congolese context.

Congolese law grants creators the freedom to exploit their works directly or through assignment. These rights are transferable, by sale, inheritance, or licensing, but must always be documented in writing. This provision acknowledges that many artists operate under unequal bargaining conditions, and it seeks to protect them from coercive or one-sided contracts. The law's explicit rejection of blanket assignments of future works serves as a safeguard against potential exploitation.

=== Law No. 73-021 of 20 July 1973 and complementary legal text ===
Law No. 73-021 of 20 July 1973, concerning property, land, real estate, and securities, amended by Law No. 80-008 of 18 July 1980, stipulates in its first article that intellectual rights belong to the category of patrimonial rights. This classification excludes them from extra-patrimonial rights, accentuating that intellectual property generates revenue for its holder. While intellectual rights retain a significant moral aspect, their placement under patrimonial law reflects a broader societal shift in which creative and cultural values are increasingly viewed through an economic lens.

The protection of literary, musical, and artistic works is also governed by several additional laws and ministerial orders, including:

- Ordinance-Law No. 74/003 of 2 January 1974, on the mandatory deposit of publications.
- Ministerial Order No. 29/CAB/MJCA/93 of 21 August 1993, regulating the exploitation, importation, sale, and reproduction of musical, literary, and artistic works.
- Ministerial Order No. 002/CAB/MJCA/94 of 31 January 1994, implementing Ordinance-Law No. 86-033 of 5 April 1986, on the protection of copyright and related rights.
- Ministerial Order No. 32/CAB/MCA/0015/2007 of 8 September 2007, on the collection of copyright and related rights by SONECA.
- Ministerial Order No. 32/CAB/MCA/0016/2007 of 8 September 2007, establishing the authorization procedures and royalty rates for mechanical and graphic reproduction rights of literary, musical, and artistic works.
- Ministerial Order No. 32/CAB/MCA/0017/2007 of 8 September 2007, approving the rates and tariffs of private-copy royalties.
- Ministerial Order No. 32/CAB/MCA/0018/2007 of 8 September 2007, regulating the broadcasting of films, television shows, and documentaries by radio and television organizations.
- Ministerial Order No. 32/CAB/MCA/0019/2007 of 8 September 2007, regulating live performances of musical and dramatic works.
- Ministerial Order No. 25/CAB/MCA/MM/C.J/091 of 22 May 2004, establishing the stamping (labeling) system for phonograms, videograms, books, and works of art produced or imported into the DRC.
- Circular Note No. 001/CAB/MIN/CA/2007 of 21 December 2007, on the circulation of phonographic and videographic media within the DRC.
- Decision No. 272/CATC/SONECA/U.5/2008 of 2 December 2008, regulating the sale, distribution, exhibition, importation, and exportation of musical, literary, and artistic works across the DRC.
- Decision No. 310/CATC/SONECA/U.5/2008 of 12 December 2008, establishing the Permanent Commission for the Control and Verification of the sale, distribution, exhibition, importation, reproduction, and exportation of musical, literary, and artistic works throughout the national territory.
