= Barbara Kanam =

Congolese musician (born 1973)

- Also known as: African Diva Barbara Kanam
- Born: Barbara Kanam Mutund; September 27, 1973 (age 52)
- Origin: Bukavu, South Kivu, Zaïre (modern-day Democratic Republic of the Congo)
- Genres: Congolese rumba; ndombolo; soukous; world
- Occupations: Singer-songwriter; dancer; record producer; actress; philanthropist
- Instrument: Vocals
- Years active: 1991–present
- Website: Barbara-Kanam.com

Cultural Promotion Fund
- Incumbent
- Assumed office 8 July 2023
- Prime Minister: Sama Lukonde
- Preceded by: Alain-Innocent Ntamirira Mugisho

Barbara Kanam Mutund (born 27 September 1973), known professionally as Barbara Kanam, is a Congolese singer-songwriter, producer, television personality, philanthropist, and politician currently serving as the Director General of the Cultural Promotion Fund. Noted for her coloratura and soprano vocal range, Kanam is considered one of the most influential figures in 21st-century Congolese and African popular music. She sings in French, Swahili, Lingala, and English, often addressing themes such as peace, love, happiness, and women's rights in her lyrics.

Born in Bukavu, she gained fame after being spotted by Ivorian reggae singer Alpha Blondy and producer Dodo Koné, who produced her 1999 debut studio album, Mokili. The album's gospel-influenced lead single "Mokili Ekoleka" earned Kanam a television appearance at the Koras Awards. Kanam's second studio album, Téti, released in 2003, won her Most Promising African Female Artist at the 2003 Kora Awards. Téti won her many accolades, including Best Female of Central Africa at Kunde d'Or and Tamani d'O for Best Female Hope in 2004, followed by two consecutive Black Music Awards in 2005 for Revelation of the Year and Best Video for "Bibi Madeleine: L'argent appelle l'argent" in 2005.

Breaking away from Koné's record label in 2008, Kanam established Kanam Music. She released her third studio album, Karibu, in January 2010 and won the Okapi Award for Best Female Artist the following year. In July 2015, her fourth studio album, Zawadi, earned her the Ndule Award for Best Female Voice and the Afroca Music Award for Best Female Artist. Her fifth studio album, Transfiguration, premiered on 23 December 2023.

Aside from music, Kanam owns Kanam Luxury, a boutique in Kinshasa specializing in her branded products, including the Barbara Luxury champagne line.

== Life and career ==
=== 1973–1998: Childhood, education and music debut ===
Barbara Kanam Mutund was born on 27 September 1973 in Bukavu, Zaire (now the Democratic Republic of the Congo), into an upper-middle-class family as one of twelve children. Her father, a Lunda executive, worked as the General Manager of the Sheraton Hotel in Lubumbashi, while her mother hailed from the Bemba ethnic group. After completing her secondary studies at the Belgian private school of Kolwezi, she went to study international business at the University of Pretoria in South Africa in 1991. While in Pretoria, she became involved in the local evangelical church community, which provided her first formal exposure to music. Attending church regularly, she seized the attention of the congregation and the pastor, who invited her to direct and perform solos in the church choir. In an interview with Le Potentiel, Kanam stated that "It was through this choir that I realized that I had a gift for music". Her burgeoning interest in music compelled her to abandon her international business studies, opting instead for theological and musical education at Rhema Bible School and the Psalmody Academy in Johannesburg. However, due to her father's job loss, the family's financial situation became precarious, making it challenging for Kanam to afford her school fees. She thus sought employment to support her family while managing to complete her university year. As a form of celebration for her academic achievement, she purchased a guitar as a self-congratulatory gift, which she taught herself to play and began composing her music.

When she returned to Lubumbashi during academic recess, she confided her musical aspirations to her father, who vehemently disapproved. Discontent with her choice, he asserted that she should no longer return to Pretoria. Concerned about the potential challenges she might face at the University of Lubumbashi, Kanam consented to take a sabbatical year. During this time in Lubumbashi, she found work in the import-export sector to assist her family. In the early 1990s, Kanam began to perform in Central Africa. In 1993, she developed an acoustic setlist for a "One Woman Acoustic Show" and traveled across the region, staging performances in major cities such as Kinshasa and Lubumbashi.

In 1995, her family relocated to Abidjan, Ivory Coast, where she became a soloist in her church choir, La Réconciliation de Mel Eg Théodore. In 1977, while performing at the Hôtel Ivoire, she was spotted by Alpha Blondy and his manager, Koné Dodo. In an interview with Le Potentiel, Kanam stated that Koné Dodo exhorted her to pursue a music career. Although they wanted to sign her, Kanam's parents insisted she complete her studies before pursuing a music career. Later that year, she eventually earned her BTS International Commerce from the Université Tertiaire et Technologique in Abidjan.

=== 1999–2008: Mokili and Téti ===
In 1999, Kanam released her debut studio album, Mokili, which was produced by Koné Dodo. The album featured the gospel-influenced single "Mokili Ekoleka" and earned her a Kora Award nomination, where she made her television debut, presenting her album at the awards ceremony. In 2000, Kanam took a break from performing and moved to Paris due to her pregnancy. After a two-year hiatus, she resumed her music career with the release of her second studio album, Téti, on 1 January 2003. The record, consisting of 12 tracks, was co-produced by Kiki Productions and Nouvelle JAT Music, Koné Dodo's label. Téti achieved success in the Burkinabè market, particularly in Ouagadougou, where it received airplay on Radio Télévision du Burkina for five months. The breakout single, "Bibi Madeleine: L'argent appelle l'argent", paid homage to her grandmother and sampled Pamelo Mounk'a's 1985 hit "L'argent appelle l'argent". The song debuted in two versions, one featuring Edgar Yonkeu and the other featuring Awilo Longomba. In April 2003, she was nominated during the 3rd edition of Kundé d'Or and subsequently performed at the Palais des Sports de Ouaga 2000 to promote Téti. Additionally, she graced the stage at the Culture Palace of Abidjan, sharing the platform with Aicha Koné, Tiane, Mawa Traoré, Joelle Séka, Tigress Sidonie, and Chantal Taïba to further support Téti. She returned to Burkina Faso to partake in the Wuïré festival from 29 October to 1 November in the Imasgo Department.

Kanam's success with Téti earned her the Kora Award for Most Promising African Female Artist on 6 December 2003 at the Sandton Convention Center in Sandton. On 30 April 2004, she was honored with the Best Female of Central Africa at Kunde d'Or in Burkina Faso. She went on to perform at the Culture Palace in Abidjan, joining Coumba Gawlo, Chantal Taïba, and Tigress Sidonie. A reissued version of "Bibi Madeleine: L'argent appelle l'argent", co-written with Awilo Longomba and Edgar Yonkeu, was released in 2005. It gained immense popularity throughout Africa, the Caribbean, and Europe's African expatriate population, notably in France, earning Kanam two consecutive Black Music Awards for Best Video and Revelation of the Year. The following year, she collaborated with Fally Ipupa on the track "100% Love" from his album Droit Chemin.

=== 2009–2014: Karibu and "Africa Stop Ebola" ===
In 2008, Kanam ended her contract with Koné Dodo and founded her own record label, Kanam Music. She commenced work on her third studio album, Karibu (Swahili for "welcome"), in Paris the same year. Subsequently, she relocated to Ivory Coast in July 2009 to focus on Karibu. An event was organized by the King Production record label in Abidjan, which involved approximately thirty journalists to broadcast the album's forthcoming release. She then returned to Lubumbashi in November to oversee the production of Karibu's music videos and conducted several concerts. The album was officially released in January 2010 by Kanam Music. It blends Congolese rumba and features Fally Ipupa on the track "Noir & Blanc". Karibu achieved critical success, with journalists and broadcasters such as Claudy Siar and Yves Robert Brazza Kambala declaring it as one of the year's best releases. Kanam became a "standard-bearer" for female African musicians. Kanam later performed at Venus Hotel in Kinshasa during the 2nd edition of the Ndule Awards and received a nomination for Best Female Artist at the 3rd edition of MTV Africa Music Awards. She also performed at the Obelisk Square in Dakar as part of the 3rd edition of the World Festival of Black Arts.

In October 2014, Kanam was featured on "Africa Stop Ebola", a song promoting awareness about Ebola hemorrhagic fever in Africa. The song features singers Tiken Jah Fakoly, Amadou & Mariam, Salif Keita, Oumou Sangaré, Kandia Kouyaté, Mory Kanté, Sia Tolno, and rappers Didier Awadi, Marcus, and Mokobé Traoré. It includes instructions from experts on how to respect health and hygienic precautions.

=== 2015–present: Zawadi, standalone releases, and Transfiguration ===
Kanam began recording her fourth studio album, Zawadi, in 2014. She explained in an interview with La Prospérité that "Zawadi" is a Swahili word for "gift" and symbolizes a precious divine gift bestowed on Earth. The album features a choreographed dance known as the "danse du président". While working on Zawadi, Kanam also served as a jury member in the Jeunes Talents music contest and later toured Paris to negotiate distribution deals for the album's forthcoming release. The album premiered digitally on 1 July 2015, and on compact disc on 12 July. The album blended Congolese rumba and includes collaborations with Bana C4 and zouk singer Marvin. Kanam described Zawadi as her "most accomplished" album, artistically and vocally richer than her previous records. She supported the album with a concert at the Roméo Golf in Kinshasa on 28 November. In August 2016, Kanam received the Best African Female Artist award during the 2nd edition of the Afroca Music Awards in Brazzaville. Back in Kinshasa, she gave an interview to La Prospérité expressing her gratitude to the people who had supported her throughout her 15-year musical career. Zawadi also won her the Jury Special Award at the 11th edition of the Canal d'Or, held at the Palais des Congrès de Yaoundé in the presence of the Cameroonian First Lady, Chantal Biya.

In June 2017, Kanam revealed her upcoming single "Mela Mayi" to Forum des As. Initially recorded in 2016, a teaser of the music video was shared on YouTube that June. The video was officially launched on 19 August 2017, featuring a lively, high-spirited performance. To support "Mela Mayi", Kanam held an exclusive concert at SHOWBUZZ in Kinshasa on 15 December 2017 and received a nomination for Best Female Artist of Central Africa at the African Music Industry Awards.

In March 2018, Kanam premiered the single "Lisanga Ya Ba Mbanda", a Congolese rumba-inspired cover of M'bilia Bel's hit from the 1980s. Speaking with La Prospérité, she shared, ".....I pay a deserved and living tribute to mother Mbilia Bel, the Cleopatra". On 23 December 2019, she introduced the dance-centric single "Bouger", followed by the release of "Flèche" on 14 March 2020. Her love ballad "Atcha", a fusion of Congolese rumba sung in Swahili, Lingala, and French, was released on 9 October 2020 and received widespread acclaim in Kinshasa. To commemorate the release, she hosted a VIP event at Village Chez Ntemba, located at 10 Avenue Du Port, Gombe, Kinshasa that same evening. Wrapping up the year, she joined the 10th Festival Mondial de Musique des Femmes in Montreal, Canada, on 26–27 September, and on 19 December, she was awarded the CANA 2020 prize at the second edition of CANA (Célébration des Artistes Nationaux de l'Année; CANA), an honor she had won numerous times from this Burkinabe organization. She followed up with the single "Amour Invincible" on 9 December 2021 and "Oxygène" on 31 December 2022. On 21 February 2023, she released the Congolese rumba single "Consommation", produced by Kanam Music and distributed by Virgin Music Africa, accompanied by a music video featuring Kanam dancing and engaging in an intimate scene with a man. In two weeks, the song accumulated more than one million YouTube views. On 5 April 2023, she released the spiritually-themed song "Uzima" (Swahili for "life"), expressing gratitude to God, and on 25 May, she collaborated on Félix Wazekwa's "Jalousie XL" from his double album Article 23. In June 2023, Kanam released "Isolée", featuring Fabregas Le Métis Noir, produced by Kanam Music and co-distributed by Universal Music Africa and Virgin Music Africa.

On 23 December 2023, Kanam released her fifth studio album Transfiguration, a fusion of Congolese rumba and ndombolo. Produced by Kanam Music and co-distributed through Universal Music Africa and Virgin Music Africa, the 14-track album includes the previous track "Isolée" and collaborations with Ferré Gola, Koffi Olomide, Héritier Watanabe, Fabregas Le Métis Noir, Roga Roga, Ariel Shaney, Mimie, and Coco Argentée.

== Television and political careers ==
In 2013, Kanam served as a member of the coaching panel for the show Best of Best in Kinshasa. The following year, she participated in the inaugural season of Island Africa Talent in Yamoussoukro, Ivory Coast.

On 8 July 2023, President Félix Antoine Tshisekedi Tshilombo issued an ordinance appointing Kanam as the Director General (DG) of the Cultural Promotion Fund (FPC). Kanam is tasked with overseeing the promotion and development of the cultural sector within the country.

== Philanthropy and honors ==
Kanam established the Kanam Foundation, which she directs, as a platform to address issues related to women's empowerment and child welfare. She is also the patron of the Association for the Fight against Childhood Cancer (GFAOP).

In October 2012, she contributed to the peace-themed musical project "Stop à la Guerre à l'Est!" alongside Innoss'B, Fally Ipupa, Papa Wemba, Tshala Muana, Simaro Lutumba, Félix Wazekwa, Bill Clinton Kalonji, Marie Misamu, Meje 30 (also known as MJ30), King Kester Emeneya, Koffi Olomide, JB Mpiana, Werrason, Manda Chante, Fiston Mbuyi, Verby All Stars, Leperc, and M'bilia Bel. The project, co-produced by Peace Ambassador Odiane Lokako and Deputy Patrick Muyaya Katembwe, condemned the March 23 Movement rebellion in North Kivu and advocated for peace. In 2013, Kanam collaborated with Asalfo on a project aimed at promoting education for underprivileged children. The next year, she took part in the "Africa Stop Ebola" project, joining forces with Tiken Jah Fakoly, Amadou & Mariam, Salif Keita, Oumou Sangaré, Kandia Kouyaté, Mory Kanté, Sia Tolno, and rappers Didier Awadi, Marcus, and Mokobé Traoré, to raise awareness and combat the Ebola epidemic. In 2019, she was honored with an honorary doctorate from the University of Florida for her societal contributions, becoming the only Congolese musician to achieve this honor. She also received honorary doctorate from the Observatoire Africain de la sanction positive et les valeurs de paix (OASP), along with the title of a Woman of Value. That year, Kanam was also designated as a Champion for the Promotion of Women's Rights by Chantal Safou, the Minister of Gender, Family, and Children. In 2022, the United Nations Development Programme (UNDP) appointed her as a Goodwill Ambassador for the Promotion of Climate Action in the DRC.

== Discography ==
=== Albums ===
- Mokili (1999)
- Téti (2003)
- Karibu (2010)
- Zawadi (2015)
- Transfiguration (2023)

== Awards and nominations ==
Year	Event	Prize	Recipient	Result	Ref.
2003	Kora Awards	Most Promising African Female Artist	Herself	Won	
2004	Kunde d'Or	Best Female of Central Africa	Herself	Won	
2004	Tamani d'Or	Best Female Hope	Herself	Won	
2005	Black Music Awards	Best Video	"Bibi Madeleine: L'argent appelle l'argent" (Awilo Longomba)	Won	
2005	Black Music Awards	Revelation of the Year	Herself	Won	
2010	MTV Africa Music Awards	Best Female	Herself	Nominated	
2010	Ndule Awards	Best Female Voice of the Year	Herself	Won	
2010	Ndule Awards	Best Female Artist of the Diaspora	Herself	Won	
2010	Okapi Awards	Best Female Voice	Herself	Won	
2011	Okapi Awards	Best Female Artist	Herself	Won	
2012	Poro Awards	Best Video	"Jardin d'Amour"	Won	
2013	Poro Awards	Best Female Artist	Herself	Nominated	
2015	Ndule Awards	Best Female Voice	Herself	Won	
2016	Afroca Music Awards	Best Female Artist	Herself	Won	
2017	Canal 2'Or	Special Prize	Herself	Won	
2018	African Music Industry Awards	Best Female Artist of Central Africa	Herself	Nominated	
2019	Trophée Mwasi Ya Talo	Honorary Award	Herself	Won	
2020	CANA	Honorary Award	Herself	Won	
2024	Mundi Music Awards	Best Choreographer Artist	"Isolée" (with Fabregas Le Métis Noir)	Nominated	
