= Kristy Diamond =

Congolese musician

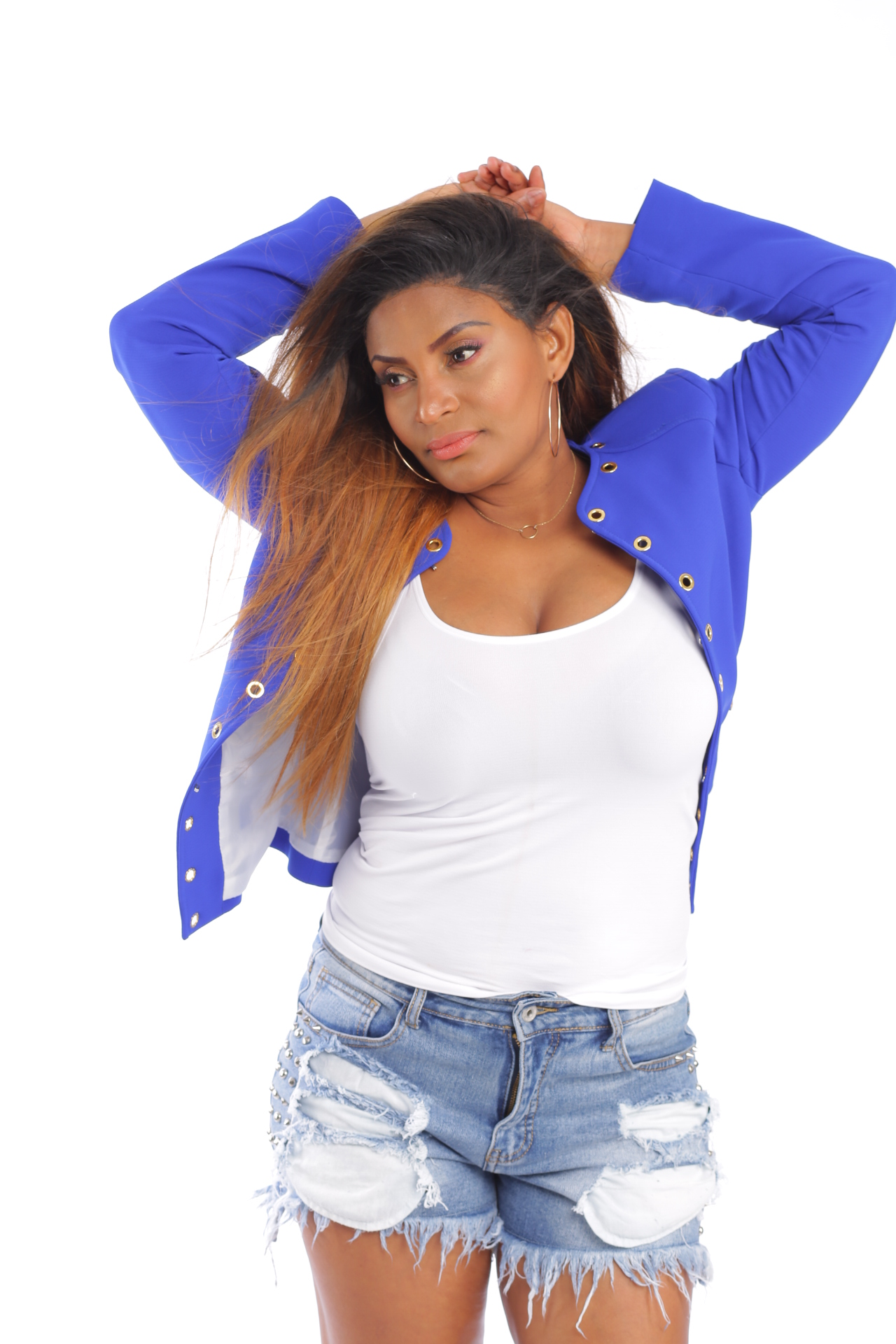
- Kristy Diamond in 2018

Background information
- Born: Christelle Dionge; Kinshasa, Zaire (modern-day Democratic Republic of the Congo)
- Genres: Congolese rumba; ndombolo; trap; Afrobeats
- Occupations: Musician; songwriter; dancer; producer
- Instruments: Guitar, vocals
- Years active: Early 2000s–present
- Label: Independent

Christelle Dionge, known professionally as Kristy Diamond, is a Congolese singer, songwriter, and producer. Born and raised in Kinshasa, Dionge began her music career in a local church choir, eventually leading her to join the acclaimed Gospel Paradis Music group. After moving to France and taking a hiatus to focus on family life, she returned to the music scene with her 2018 debut studio album Tshueke Tshueke.

== Early life and career ==
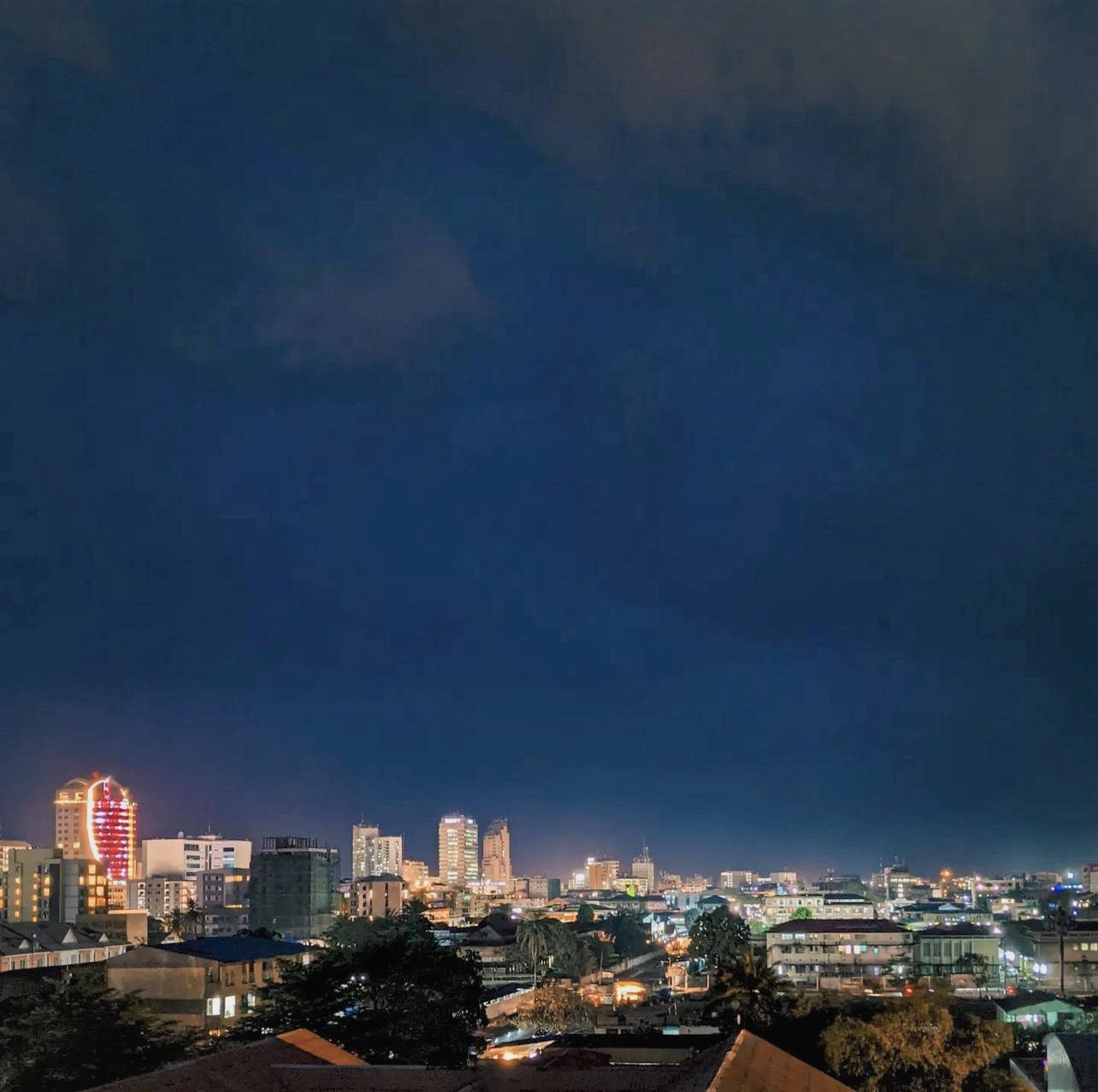
Kinshasa, the city-province where Kristy Diamond was born, lies in the western region of the Democratic Republic of the Congo.

=== Childhood and music debut ===
Christelle Dionge was born in Kinshasa, in what was formerly Zaire and is now the Democratic Republic of the Congo. She developed an interest in music early in life. Raised in a Christian family, she was introduced to music through frequent church visits and singing in a choir. At the age of 11, Kristy transitioned to gospel music and joined the acclaimed Kinshasa-based group Gospel Paradis Music. Her talent quickly became evident, and she quickly seized the attention of fellow Congolese gospel singer and pastor Kool Matopé, who invited her to join his group. When Lokua Kanza visited a rehearsal in the early 2000s, Kristy's vocals impressed Lokua Kanza, who "encouraged her to develop her talent".

=== 2006–present: Standalone releases and Tshueke Tshueke ===
In 2006, Kristy moved to Nice, France, with her husband, where she took a break from music and became a mother of three. Despite her hiatus, performed at Kool Matopé's 2010 concert in Brussels supporting efforts to combat violence against women in the Democratic Republic of the Congo. In 2016, she was invited by Bozi Boziana to contribute to his upcoming album in Paris.

Kristy began work on her debut studio album, Tshueke Tshueke, in early 2018. The lead single, "Pona Congo", was released in March 2018, and was dedicated to victims of the Kivu conflict. It was recorded at Studio Haxo and was written and produced by Kristy with guitarist Olivier Tshimanga, Congolese singer Dicarson One, and Abona. The next month, she performed two songs, "Cocorico" and "iConoclaste", on Willy Weston Ndangi's tribute album Un Homme Averti, dedicated to Papa Wemba. The releases were well received among the Congolese diaspora in France and Belgium, and were also buoyed by promotion from the pan-African radio channel, Africa Radio. Tshueke Tshueke was released later that year with seven tracks blending Congolese rumba, reggaeton, zumba, and Afrobeats. Vincent Zorgue handled mixing, mastering, and production, with arrangements by Vincent Zorgue and Deo Synthé. That same year, Kristy joined the Association Congo Sebene (ACS).

After more than a decade in France, Kristy returned to Kinshasa to perform a concert for a professional audience, attended by Congolese political figures. In April 2020, she released the single "Corona Ezo Boma", which raised awareness of the COVID-19 pandemic and promoted health guidelines. "Corona Ezo Boma" was produced by Zorgue, who also co-arranged the record with Deo Synthé, with Hilton Aya producing the music video. In October of that year, Kristy released the Forgue- and Roger Matondo-produced single "Sanduku", which tells the story of a couple who overcome obstacles and reunite.

On 11 June 2021, she featured on Blaise Bula's Congolese rumba-infused single "Shadie". In March 2022, Kristy guest-performed on the single "Leopards Fimbu International" in support of Les Léopards during the playoff phase for the 2022 FIFA World Cup African qualifiers. The song included guest features from Félix Wazekwa, Flaety W. Manuke, Lokua Kanza, Kadiyoyo, JB Mpiana, Barbara Kanam, Koffi Olomide, Cindy Le Cœur, Héritier Watanabe, Laetitia Lokua, Adolphe Dominguez, Werrason, Lemiran LEM, Ferré Gola, and Innoss'B. In March 2024, she released the Congolese rumba- and trap-influenced single "Pays des merveilles", which included a guest appearance by Ferré Gola. It was produced and mixed by Ingénieur Zorg and includes guitar arrangements by Mbetenge Domingo.

== Discography ==
=== Album and singles ===
Year	Title	Details
2018	Tshueke Tshueke	Album, Released: 2018; Producer: Vincent Zorgue; Arrangement: Vincent Zorgue and Deo Synthé
2020	"Corona Ezo Boma"	Single, Released: 1 April 2020; Producer: Vincent Zorgue; Arrangement: Vincent Zorgue and Deo Synthé
2020	"Sanduku"	Single, Released: 20 October 2020; Producer: Vincent Forgue and Roger Matondo
2024	"Pays des merveilles"	Single, Released 29 March 2024; Producer: Ingénieur Zorg; Arrangement: Mbetenge Domingo

== Awards and nominations ==
Year	Event	Prize	Recipient	Result	Ref.
2020	HAPAwards	Best Up and Coming Female Artist (Universal)	Herself	Won	
