= Seguin (disambiguation) =

Seguin or Séguin is a given name and surname.

Seguin may also refer to:

== Places ==
- Seguin, Kansas, United States, an unincorporated community
- Seguin, Texas, United States, a city and major suburb of San Antonio
- Seguin, Ontario, Canada
- Seguin River, Ontario, Canada
- Île Seguin (Seguin Island), in the Seine River in Paris
- Seguin Island, Maine, United States - see Seguin Light

== Schools ==
- Seguin High School (Arlington, Texas), United States
- Seguin High School, Seguin Independent School District, Seguin, Texas, United States
