= Cultural Promotion Fund =

Congolese public cultural funding institution

Agency overview
- Formed: Established by Ordinance-Law No. 87-013 (3 April 1987; 39 years ago)
- Jurisdiction: Government of the Democratic Republic of the Congo
- Headquarters: Gombe, Kinshasa, Democratic Republic of the Congo
- Minister responsible: Yolande Elebe Ma Ndembo, Minister of Culture, Arts and Heritage
- Agency executives: Emmanuel Ngoy Dioko, Chairperson of the board of directors; Barbara Kanam, Director general; Didier Masela Ndudi, Deputy director general
- Website: https://fpc.cd/

The Cultural Promotion Fund (French: Fonds de promotion culturelle, abbreviated as FPC) is a state-run cultural body in the Democratic Republic of the Congo under the Ministry of Culture, Arts and Heritage, responsible for funding and promoting national artistic and cultural activities. It was established during the Zaire era on 3 April 1987 as the "Mobutu Sese Seko Fund" and restructured in 2011 as a public institution with legal personality. Headquartered in Gombe, Kinshasa, the FPC provides financial support to Congolese artists, cultural practitioners, and creative industries through loans, grants, equity participation, and other related support.

== History ==
The FPC was created by Ordinance-Law No. 87-013 of 3 April 1987 under the name "Mobutu Sese Seko Fund" in what was then Zaire (now the Democratic Republic of the Congo) as a specialized state service under the supervision of the Ministry of Culture, Arts and Heritage. In 2011, the institution underwent significant restructuring. Through Decree No. 011/30 of 16 June 2011, in accordance with Article 123 of the Constitution and Law No. 08/009 of 7 July 2008 governing public establishments, the FPC was reconstituted as a public establishment with legal personality and administrative and financial autonomy.

== Legal framework and organization ==
=== Legal framework ===
Ordinance-Law No. 87-013 of 3 April 1987 legally establishes the FPC as a state agency intended to support national culture, with mandates that include the promotion of literary publishing, cinema, music, visual and performing arts, and traditional art. The ordinance authorizes the grants or subsidies to artists and cultural practitioners to enable the completion of creative projects, encourages the self-financing of cultural activities, supports the preservation and restoration of traditional artworks, and aims to improve the circulation and visibility of Congolese artistic and literary production. It also sets out the FPC's financial structure, primarily based on an ad valorem levy (percentage-based tax) applied to a broad range of cultural and commercial activities, including stationery shops, cinemas, concerts, audiovisual media, record sales, artwork exports, advertising services, fashion and jewelry businesses, beauty salons, architects, sculptors, decorators, and cultural exhibitions. Standard contribution rates are generally fixed at 5%, with reduced rates such as 2% for Congolese music recordings, and these levies constitute the FPC's main source of revenue. Payments are usually made through banks or savings institutions, with official receipts issued, and require regular declarations and payments subject to established accounting and control procedures. Funds are deposited in designated bank accounts, and collection agents operate under strict administrative rules. Subsequent ministerial orders issued between 1997 and 2002 further amended and harmonized the system by specifying taxable activities, detailing advertising tariffs, defining the roles of collectors and operators, determining revenue-sharing arrangements with the Public Treasury, and introducing enforcement mechanisms, including penalties for late payment, false declarations, or fraud, ranging from financial sanctions and surcharges to equipment seizure, suspension of activities, and judicial proceedings in serious cases.

As of 2011, the FPC was transformed into a public establishment by Decree No. 011/30 of 16 June 2011, which established its statutes. This was done pursuant to Article 123 of the Constitution and Law No. 08/009 of 7 July 2008, which laid down general provisions applicable to public establishments.

=== Structure ===
==== Board of directors ====
The board of directors consists of five members, including the director general. Board members are appointed, suspended, or dismissed by ordinance of the president of the republic, following a proposal by the government deliberated in the Council of Ministers. Their mandate lasts five years and may be renewed once, and it may also end through dismissal or voluntary resignation. From among the board's members, the president of the republic designates a chairperson who does not belong to the general directorate.

The board meets in ordinary session once every quarter upon convocation by its chairperson. Extraordinary sessions may be convened by the chairperson at the request of the supervisory authority or whenever the interests of the FPC so require, with a specified agenda. The board may deliberate validly only when three-fifths of its members are present. Decisions are adopted by a majority vote of members present, with the chairperson exercising a casting vote in the event of a tie.

==== General directorate ====
The general directorate serves as the FPC's executive and management body. It is responsible for implementing decisions taken by the board of directors and for overseeing the FPC's daily administration. Its duties include executing the budget, preparing financial statements, supervising all departments, and representing the FPC in its dealings with third parties. To this end, it is vested with all powers necessary to provide the proper functioning of the institution and to act on its behalf under all circumstances. The general directorate is headed by a director general, assisted by a Deputy Director General, both appointed or dismissed by ordinance of the president of the republic upon proposal of the government deliberated in the Council of Ministers. The current director general is Barbara Kanam, who was appointed by President Félix Antoine Tshisekedi Tshilombo on 8 July 2023. In cases of absence or incapacity, the director general is temporarily replaced by the deputy director general or, failing that, by a serving director designated by the supervisory minister on the director general's proposal. Legal proceedings involving the FPC are conducted in its name by the director general or a duly authorized representative. The remuneration of the director general and deputy director general is set by decree of the prime minister, adopted in the Council of Ministers upon proposal of the supervisory minister.

==== Board of statutory auditors ====
The board of statutory auditors is tasked with supervising the financial management. It is composed of two members drawn from different professional bodies and having recognized technical and professional competence. The auditors are appointed by decree of the prime minister, adopted in the Council of Ministers upon proposal of the supervisory minister, for a single, non-renewable term of five years. They may, however, be removed from office in cases of proven misconduct during the performance of their duties.

The statutory auditors may not take decisions individually but enjoy unrestricted rights of supervision and control over all operations of the FPC, whether acting jointly or separately. Their mandate includes examining accounting records, cash holdings, securities, inventories, and financial statements, as well as verifying the accuracy of information presented in reports submitted to the board of directors. They may consult all documents of the FPC without removing them. An annual audit report is submitted to the supervisory minister, detailing the audit methods used, identifying any irregularities or inaccuracies, and making appropriate recommendations. The auditors receive a fixed allowance paid by the FPC, the amount of which is determined by decree of the prime minister deliberated in the Council of Ministers.

==== Provincial level ====
At the provincial level, the FPC's administrative structure is composed of provincial directorates and their respective branches. These include:

- Provincial Directorate of Kinshasa, with the Kinshasa-East and Kinshasa-West branches
- Provincial Directorate of Haut-Katanga, comprising the Likasi branch
- Provincial Directorate of Lualaba, comprising the Kolwezi branch
- Provincial Directorate of Tanganyika, comprising the Kalemie branch
- Provincial Directorate of Kongo Central, with branches in Boma and Mbanza-Ngungu
- Provincial Directorate of South Kivu, comprising the Uvira branch
- Provincial Directorate of North Kivu, with branches in Beni, Butembo, and Rutshuru
- Provincial Directorate of Maniema, comprising the Kindu branch
- Provincial Directorate of Kasaï, comprising the Tshikapa branch
- Provincial Directorate of Kwilu, with a branch in Bandundu and Kikwit
- Provincial Directorate of Ituri, with a branch in Bunia
- Provincial Directorate of Haut-Uélé, comprising the Isiro branch
- Provincial Directorate of Sud-Ubangi, with a branch in Gemena
- Provincial Directorate of Kasaï-Oriental, comprising the Mbuji-Mayi branch
- Provincial Directorate of Lomami, with a branch in Mwene-Ditu

=== Interventions and support ===
The FPC intervenes exclusively in projects of a cultural or artistic nature, excluding activities from other sectors. Its support may take the form of loans, equity participation, interest-rate subsidies, or grants.

- Loans constitute a form of financial assistance whereby the FPC funds a cultural or artistic project with the obligation that the principal and accrued interest be repaid. Loans may be classified as short-, medium-, or long-term, depending on the repayment period. Short-term loans are repayable within one year, medium-term loans within three years, and long-term loans over a period exceeding three years. The repayment schedule is determined based on the scale of the project and the duration of its execution and is specified in the loan agreement or in a separate document endorsed by the parties.
- Equity participation occurs when the FPC co-finances the execution of a cultural or artistic project alongside a public or private individual or entity. Such participation may generate financial returns for the FPC or be granted on a non-reimbursable basis, depending on the nature of the project. Non-recoverable equity participation is reserved for projects deemed to be of significant importance to the promotion and dissemination of Congolese culture at the national or international level.
- The FPC may grant interest-rate advantages to borrowers who are promoters or holders of cultural or artistic projects it finances, provided that repayment occurs before the contractual maturity date. The amount of the subsidy is determined by the director general, based on an assessment of the borrower's performance.
- Grants include non-reimbursable financial assistance provided by the FPC to support cultural or artistic projects undertaken by individuals or entities, whether public or private, that serve the general interest.

=== Beneficiaries and eligibility criteria ===
Support from the FPC may be granted to any individual or legal entity active in the cultural or artistic sector that submits a project meeting the requirements of this order. When several projects compete for funding, the FPC allocates its resources according to availability and evaluates proposals based on criteria such as the merit of the promoter, their contribution to the FPC's revenues, their reliability as evidenced by previous financial obligations or completed projects, and the anticipated cultural impact of the initiative.

Projects eligible for support include activities related to:

- Literature
- Music
- Cinema
- Visual, graphic, and performing arts
- Photography
- Dance and choreography
- Folklore
- Literary publishing
- The music industry

Individuals or entities acting as assignees, license holders, executors, or performers of cultural or artistic works may also qualify for assistance, provided that project execution does not violate the copyright rights of the original author.

=== Financing procedure ===
==== Submission of financing applications ====
Any individual or entity holding or promoting a cultural or artistic project seeking financial support must submit a financing application to the FPC. Applications are addressed to the director general and filed with the general directorate, which issues an acknowledgment of receipt. At the provincial level, applications are submitted to the director general through the Provincial Director or the head of the relevant branch responsible for the project's area of implementation or the applicant's place of residence or domicile. Applications received by a branch head are transmitted through the administrative hierarchy to the Provincial Director, who forwards them, together with an opinion, to the director general within a maximum period of thirty days. Applications are considered admissible only if they include identification of the project holder or promoter; for legal entities, documentation attesting to legal status and, where applicable, tax compliance; a technical and descriptive project file; and a formal request for financing. All applications are reviewed by the general directorate, with those submitted at intermediary levels undergoing an initial screening.

Examination takes place in two stages: an administrative phase and a technical phase.

- Administrative review: Upon receipt of an application, the director general refers the file to the competent Directorate of the FPC, which verifies the completeness of the documentation and its conformity with regulatory requirements.
- Technical assessment: Once administrative verification is completed, the directorate evaluates the project's technical merits, including its cultural or artistic significance, its contribution to Congolese culture, its feasibility, the credibility of the promoter, and the adequacy and reliability of proposed guarantees. The findings of this assessment are submitted to the general directorate in the form of a report, accompanied by the directorate's opinion.

Credit committee review

The directorate's report is examined by the credit committee established within the FPC. The Committee is responsible for conducting a quantitative assessment of the financing request, proposing financing priorities, determining the form, level, and frequency of intervention, recommending applicable rates and loan repayment schedules, and assessing the suitability of grants and equity participation. The credit committee is chaired by the deputy director general and includes the Financial Director as Vice-Chair, Directors as members, the Coordinator of Agencies, and the head of the Legal and Litigation Service as Secretary. Its conclusions and recommendations are forwarded to the director general.

==== Financing decision and contract ====
Based on the credit committee's report, the director general may approve financing, reject the application, or return the file for further examination. The applicant is notified of the decision within sixty days of receipt of the application. In cases of approval, the notification invites the promoter to proceed with the signing of the financing contract.

All financial support granted by the FPC is governed by a contract prepared by its legal services. Depending on the nature of the intervention, the contract may take the form of a loan, grant, or equity participation agreement and specifies applicable interest rates and required guarantees. Interest rates are determined by the FPC in consideration of market conditions, promotional objectives, and contractual specifics. Loan-based financing must be secured by appropriate guarantees, such as mortgages, pledges, sureties, endorsements, or bank guarantees, whose validity and effectiveness are verified by the FPC's legal services.

==== Disbursement of funds, monitoring, and oversight ====
After the signing of the contract, the director general instructs the Financial Directorate to release the funds and ensures that the amount falls within his or her delegated authority. Where the amount exceeds this authority, approval is sought from the supervisory body in accordance with Article 28, fifth indent, of Decree No. 011/30 of 16 June 2011 establishing the statutes of the FPC. Depending on project requirements, funds may be disbursed in installments according to a schedule determined by the director general.

The directorate of FPC monitors project implementation and evaluates outcomes, while the directorate of Control and Inspection conducts regular or ad hoc inspections to verify proper execution and use of funds. Inspection findings are reported to the director general, who may suspend additional disbursements or terminate the contract in cases of non-performance, poor execution, or misuse of funds, without prejudice to reimbursement obligations or possible judicial proceedings.

=== Finances ===
Within each province, the FPC's activities in the city hosting the provincial directorate are administered directly by that directorate. Provincial directorates are entitled to receive 30% of the revenues generated within their respective jurisdictions to meet operational needs, including staff remuneration, running costs, the financing of cultural and artistic projects, and performance-based incentives. The remaining 70% of collected revenues is transferred to the equalization fund managed by the general directorate.

Financial management

The FPC's fiscal year runs from 1 January to 31 December. Its accounts are maintained in compliance with applicable national legislation. The annual budget is adopted by the board of directors and submitted to the supervising minister for approval, in accordance with Article 29 of the relevant decree, before being executed by the general directorate. The budget is structured into an operating budget and an investment budget:

- The operating budget comprises revenues, operating and exceptional resources, and expenditures, including allocations for cultural promotion, operating costs, personnel expenses, such as professional training and staff-related costs, and other financial charges.
- The investment budget covers expenditures related to the acquisition, renewal, or development of fixed assets used in professional activities, as well as the acquisition of other fixed assets not directly assigned to these activities, including financial participations and residential buildings. Its revenue sources include funds earmarked to finance these investments, such as new state contributions, government equipment grants, loans, operating surpluses and miscellaneous income, withdrawals from invested assets, proceeds from asset sales, and other resources authorized by the board of directors.

The FPC's accounting system is designed to ensure the identification and control of expenditures, losses, revenues, and gains, to determine its general financial position, and to establish annual results.
