= Co-ownership =

Co-ownership is a legal concept in a business where two or more co-owners share the legal ownership of property.

For the concept of co-ownership in different legal codes, see:

- Concurrent estate, for co-ownership in the common law system
- Co-ownership (association football), for co-ownership of a player in association football (compartecipazione in Italy)

== See also ==
- Capital participation
- Equity sharing
- Joint ownership (disambiguation)
