= Intermediate rent =

Intermediate rent is a rental subsidy product in the UK. It comes under the umbrella of Affordable Housing. It was introduced by New Labour at the start of the 21st century. The subsidy is mainly funded by the government through the Homes and Communities Agency.

== Intermediate Rent ==
Intermediate Rent (UK) is the practice of renting property at a subsidised rent from a Housing Association or Registered Social Landlord. The product was conceived to allow households without the money for a deposit to purchase a home the opportunity to obtain a home whilst still saving for a deposit. The product can be aimed at key workers (as defined by the UK government).

The schemes are administered by HomeBuy agents who coordinate the properties available for different regions of the UK. It is their responsibility to advertise, find tenants, and check eligibility of tenants. HomeBuy agents are defined under the Housing and Regeneration Act 2008.

== Rent to HomeBuy ==
Another form of Intermediate Rent is known as "Rent to HomeBuy". This is where an applicant will be able to live in a property at a discounted rent for a period of three to five years at a subsidised rent, whilst keeping an option to purchase a percentage of the property at any point during the tenancy (typically 25%). This allows the household to live in the property of their choice, whilst using the money they save through the rent subsidy to save for a deposit.
