= Joint ownership =

Joint ownership refers to:

- Housing equity partnership
- Co-ownership (disambiguation)
- Joint venture, a business entity created by two or more parties

== See also ==
- Concurrent estate
