= Félix Wazekwa =

Congolese musician (born 1962)

- Also known as: S'Grave (Grave Wisdom); Monstre d'amour; Mokuwa Bongo (The Brain Bone); Le Miran; Monsieur Google; Cas oyo benga nzembo
- Born: Félix Nlandu Wazekwa; 14 September 1962 (age 64); Léopoldville, Belgian Congo (modern-day Kinshasa, Democratic Republic of the Congo)
- Genres: Congolese rumba; soukous; ndombolo
- Occupations: Singer; dancer; lyricist; songwriter; author; filmmaker; bandleader
- Instruments: Vocals; guitar; percussion
- Years active: 1970s–present
- Labels: Sun Records; Rythmo-Disc; JPS Production; Kiki Productions; Foundation Wazekwa
- Website: https://cultura6.tripod.com/index.htm

Félix Nlandu Wazekwa (born 14 September 1962) is a Congolese singer-songwriter, author, filmmaker, dancer, and bandleader. Known for his Lingala deep lyrics and baritone voice, he is regarded as an influential figure in soukous and Congolese rumba music and one of the most prominent lyricists of his generation.

Wazekwa began his music career as a member of the Kinshasa-based group Kin-Verso. In 1995, he released his debut solo studio album, Tétragramme. In 1997, Wazekwa formed his band, Cultur'A Pays-Vie, and released his second studio album titled Pauvres, Mais. His third studio album, Bonjour Monsieur, published in November 1998, became a significant success throughout Africa and won him the ACMCO Revelation of the Year award. In 1999, Wazekwa released his fourth studio album, Sponsor, followed by Signature (2001) and Yo Nani? (2002). His later albums include Et Après... (2004), Faux Mutu Moko Boye (2005), Que Demande Le Peuple? (2008), Mémoire ya Nzambe (2010), Adamu na Eva (2013), and I Love You, which came out in January 2015.

Wazekwa gained widespread recognition with his breakout ndombolo-infused single, "Fimbu", which debuted in September 2015 in support of the Congolese national football team, nicknamed Les Léopards. It gained significant popularity during the run-up to the 2016 African Nations Championship and went on to become a sleeper hit in 2017 during the Africa Cup of Nations. The song also introduced the "Fimbu chicotte" dance, where players raised their right hand, snapped it down like a whip, kept their left arm stretched out, and moved together with short, matching steps across the field. In 2020, Wazekwa released his thirteenth studio album, Article 23.

His book Les Petits Bonbons de la Sagesse was published by Éditions Bergame on 10 January 2018.

== Early life and career ==
=== 1962–1995: Childhood, education and music debut ===
Félix Nlandu Wazekwa was born on 14 September 1962 in Léopoldville (now Kinshasa), then part of the Belgian Congo (later the Republic of the Congo, then Zaïre, and now the Democratic Republic of the Congo), to Félix Wazekwa Ndomingiedi, a trained architect, and Marie Luvuma. His father worked for the Ministry of Public Works and Land Planning, the World Bank, and the Office of Roads. He was also involved in business, belonged to the Confederation of Small and Medium Enterprises of Congo (Confédération des Petites et Moyennes Entreprises du Congo, COPEMECO), and led the "Construction and Buildings" group in Kinshasa. Wazekwa was drawn to music at a young age and formed a troupe of local children in the 1970s, and became known for dancing. He later formed a traditional music band called SODEPA in Matete, where he was noted for his singing and dancing. Then, between 1982 and 1983, he started another band called Kin-Verso in the same area.

After graduating from high school with a French baccalaureate from the Académie des Beaux-Arts in Kinshasa, Wazekwa pursued economics studies at Paris 8 University Vincennes-Saint-Denis in 1985. Besides his studies, he taught himself by reading many books, which sparked his interest in the works of writers such as Henry Nelson Wieman, Paul Valéry, Jean d'Ormesson, and Michel Serres. After completing his studies, he returned to Kinshasa and began writing songs for several up-and-coming Zairean artists. His work soon seized the attention of Koffi Olomidé, who used many of Wazekwa's compositions in several albums released between 1991 and 1993, such as Haut De Gamme - Koweit, Rive Gauche, and Noblesse Oblige.

After working with Koffi Olomidé for a short time, Papa Wemba asked Wazekwa to help with songwriting. In 1994, Wazekwa wrote four songs for Viva La Musica's album Foridoles, with "Reference" standing out as the signature track. He also claimed to have written "Nzete Ya Séquoia". The next year, he worked again with Papa Wemba by contributing to the album Pôle Position.

== Solo career ==
=== 1995–1997: Tétragramme and Pauvres, Mais… ===
While helping produce Papa Wemba's album Pôle Position, Wazekwa was encouraged by Papa Wemba to begin a solo music career. That same year, he began recording his 10-track debut studio album, Tétragramme, with help from Papa Wemba and Madilu System. In an interview with Afropop Worldwide, Wazekwa said that he was also performing as a gospel singer while working on the album. Tétragramme was released in December 1995 through the French label Sun Records and blended Congolese rumba and soukous. It was arranged by Wazekwa and Didier Milla and featured guest vocals from Luciana Demingongo, Madilu System, Nyboma Mwan'dido, Papa Wemba, Shimita, and Yakini Kiese, along with backing vocals by Abby Surya, Patricia Aubou, and Valérie Colau. Rhythm guitars were played by Caien Madoka, Lokassa Ya Mbongo, and Maïka Munan, bass guitars by Guy Nsangué, Ngouma Lokito, drums by Djudjuchet Luvengoka, percussions by Mavungu Malanda, and animated vocals by atalakus Awilo Longomba, Colombani Wa Senga, and Yakini Kiese. Tétragramme received positive reviews and earned Wazekwa the Best Revelation of the Year award from the Association des Chroniqueurs de Musique du Congo (ACMCO).

In 1997, while working on his second studio album Pauvres, Mais... ("Poor, but..."), Wazekwa formed a band called Cultur'A Pays-Vie, which included new artists like Vicky Nasdaq and José Nzita. Pauvres, Mais... had ten songs and was recorded at Studio Macadam. It was released the same year and produced by Wazekwa, Claude Liongo, and Serge Masengo under the French label Rythmo-Disc. The music arrangements were done by Sec Bidens, and both Wazekwa and Bidens played acoustic guitar. The album featured main vocal performances from Wazekwa, Bozi Boziana, Luciana Demingongo, and Tabu Ley Rochereau, with backing vocals from Awa Maïga, Bitou Kikinda, Luciana Demingongo, Nyboma, Raphaël Makondika, Shimita, Solo Sita, Valérie Belinga, and Wuta Mayi. Percussion was managed by Deba Sungu, while Philippe Guez worked on programming. The album also included animated vocal parts from atalakus Papy Tshimanga and Prince Moba. The album's thematic content, which explored love and socioeconomic issues, was praised by critics. The track "Biléi Ya Mobóla" used figurative language to address love and the difficulties faced by the poor, while the eponymous single criticized the societal disregard for the poor.

=== 1998–2004: from Bonjour Monsieur to Et Après... ===
Wazekwa released his third studio album, Bonjour Monsieur, on 10 November 1998, which included ten tracks. The album was recorded at Studio Marcadet and produced by Cameroonian producer Jean-Pierre Saah, with Elvis Kemayo serving as executive producer. Wazekwa sang the lead vocals, supported by backing vocals from Abby Surya, Balou Canta, Luciana Demingongo, and Monglisha Kivuna. The instruments were played by different musicians, including congas by Ikonola Isibangi, drums by Komba Bellow, and mixing by Ambroise Voundi, while Thierry Galion handled programming. Nono Manzanza also appeared as an atalaku.

Bonjour Monsieur helped Wazekwa's career grow, as it came during the rise of ndombolo music. He adapted to this style by adding dance moves and choreography to his shows, which became one of his trademarks. The album also became popular because it was played on major African radio stations like Africa nº 1, which helped Cultur'A Pays Vie to gain more fans across West and Central Africa. Around this time, Joss Diena also joined his band and was seen by Wazekwa as a potential successor.

In December 1999, Wazekwa released Sponsor, a ten-song album recorded at Meko Studio in Kinshasa and Marcadet Studio in Paris. Members of Cultur'A Pays Vie based in Europe, including Deesse, Luciana, and Djanana, also took part in the project. Sponsor became an important step for the group, as it brought them more attention in the Congolese music world and led to performances in Africa and Europe. The success of Sponsor was also boosted by the help of the Congolese soft beverage company Bralima, which supported its promotion.

Wazekwa's fifth studio album, Signature, was released in mid-June 2001. Before the album came out, he took part in a meeting of the Union des Musiciens du Congo at the Vévé-Center in Kinshasa, where a patriotic song was created. The album was recorded in Paris at Marcadet Studio, included twelve songs, and was distributed by JPS Production. Signature also introduced dance crazes such as King-Kong and Ekiti Talo, along with the Male Mambwa dance created by Lady Nzongo Esobe and performed with the help of atalakus Papy Louange and Gesac Tshipoyi.

There were claims that Signature copied Koffi Olomidé's style, but Wazekwa rejected this and said he focuses on originality. To promote the album, Wazekwa and Cultur'A Pays-Vie performed at a sold-out show at the Cinemax in Kinshasa. The album's success brought him two CHADA awards for Best Artist and Best Group, as well as three ACMCO awards for Best Composer, Best Artist, and Best Orchestra.

That year, tensions arose between rival Congolese musical camps when, in July, two members of Koffi's band Quartier Latin International, atalaku J. Kanka "CNN" and singer "Mamale", were barred from participating in Koffi's major concert at the Zénith de Paris on 14 July. Following their exclusion, the pair attempted to join Cultur'A Pays-Vie but received a lukewarm reception, as the band reportedly considered its lineup complete and hesitated to integrate members from a rival band. According to Le Phare, Wazekwa was wary of being drawn into a public feud with Koffi. Nevertheless, he later integrated Quartier Latin International's members Eric Tutsi and CNN into Cultur'A Pays-Vie. Around this period, he also faced a false rumor in Matete saying he had sacrificed a band member named Boss for fame. He denied this and said it was made up by envious rivals, stating that "Stones are only thrown at ripe fruit". He said he knew who spread the rumor but did not name them.

In September 2001, Wazekwa began working on his sixth studio album, Yo Nani?. Le Phare reported that the album dealt with life questions and social issues, and he had already started ten tracks, including "La ceinture avancée", "Le corps humain", and "Parfum de la femme". He held rehearsals at the Sodima area in Matete. That same month, he was nominated for Best Male Artist of Central Africa at the 2001 Kora Awards. In May 2002, he went on a tour in Paris with Cultur'A Pays-Vie while preparing Yo Nani? and secured a deal for a concert in Paris at LSC planned for 20 July. After that, he returned to Kinshasa to finalize the album. Yo Nani? was released on 12 November by JPS Production.

Reviewing for Le Phare, Mavambu Leya Guyo, noted that the album was different from his earlier work because it moved away from a heavy guitar-driven sound and focused more on philosophical and societal commentary, especially in the hit song "Complexe". Jean-Pierre Nkutu wrote that the song used figurative language to describe an egocentric and secretive man who hides the truth, controls others, and creates fear. Some of the lyrics were seen as criticism of Koffi, and during this period, Wazekwa confirmed that he had an ongoing personal and professional dispute with him, although he did not explain the full cause. He mentioned recent issues, including a planned Quartier Latin concert in Matete that was canceled after local resistance, and soon after, the owner of Somida Bar, which had been Cultur'A Pays-Vie's base, asked him to leave the place. These events were seen by many as planned actions linked to Koffi's side.

People in Kinshasa said the rivalry may have started early, when Wazekwa was still building his career, especially after he worked with Papa Wemba on projects that helped boost Wemba's music, which some say Koffi later saw it as a rivalry. The conflict grew stronger after Koffi released the album Effrakata in December 2001, which many believed contained veiled jabs at Wazekwa. At this point, Wazekwa spoke more openly about the rivalry and used it to reinforce his position in the music industry.

Wazekwa released his seventh studio album, Et Après..., on 25 August 2004. It was produced across Africa and Europe by Cameroonian producer Edgar Yonkeu and Kiki Productions, run by Franco-Guinean producer Kiki Touré. The album attained notable success, especially with the hit dance track "Sautez Déjà", and the accompanying dance craze known as "nzoto ya mama elengi", meaning "the woman's body is welcoming". The album's success earned Wazekwa the Best Central African Male at the Kora Awards in South Africa.

=== 2005–2010: from Faux Mutu Moko Boye to Mémoire ya Nzambe ===
In December 2005, Wazekwa issued his eighth studio album, Faux Mutu Moko Boye, often abbreviated FMMB, through Kiki Productions. Wazekwa recorded Faux Mutu Moko Boye in Paris with Cultur'A Pays-Vie. The album was highly successful and got strong praise from fans in Kinshasa, with Wazekwa selling out performances.

In February 2006, Wazekwa made his debut American tour with shows in Massachusetts, New Jersey, and New York, including a notable appearance at Harvard University during a symposium on Congolese culture. Towards the year's end, he issued a six-track maxi-single titled Mosapi Liboso as part of his endorsement with Bralima.

In 2007, Cultur'A Pays-Vie went through problems when several influential members left the group to join Quartier Latin International, led by Koffi. This feud became serious and led to both artists being banned from appearing on Congolese TV, radio, and newspapers, according to La Prospérité. The provincial authorities said the ban was meant to help calm tensions in the music industry. The rivalry also turned violent, including an attack on Hono Kapanga, a former artistic director and soloist of Cultur'A Pays-Vie who had defected to Quartier Latin. The feud between the two sides caused concern in society, as Jordache Diala from La Prospérité said that these public disputes were damaging Congolese music by turning it into a platform for insults and polemics instead of artistic expression.

In January 2008, Wazekwa added new backup singers and released his ninth album, Que Demande Le Peuple?, under his Foundation Wazekwa label. This marked a fresh phase for his group after internal changes. The next year, he performed at Olympia Hall in Paris and Zénith de Lille.

After ending his European tour, Wazekwa began work with Cultur'A Pays Vie on 13 October on the forthcoming three-track maxi-single La Chèvre de Monsieur Séguin, translated as "the goat of Mr. Seguin", at ICA Studio of the RTNC's Institut Congolais de l'Audiovisuel et du Multimédia. The maxi-single was released in December under Foundation Wazekwa and supported by singles "La Chèvre de Monsieur Séguin", "Alex Mfumu Nsi", and "Dhedhe Mupasa Mot De Passe". After the release, Wazekwa focused on promotion by doing interviews, including one with Radio France Internationale in Paris.

In an interview with Nico Kalambay on Radio Okapi on 8 June 2009, Wazekwa said his tenth album, Mémoire ya Nzambe, was almost finished. He then went to Paris to finalize its production, and the album was eventually released on 15 July 2010. It was produced by Kiki Touré under Kiki Productions and included 13 songs and featured Simaro Lutumba on the eponymous track. Mémoire ya Nzambe subtly taunts his former musicians who left Cultur'A Pays Vie. He promoted Mémoire ya Nzambe with a performance at Zénith de Paris on 9 October.

=== 2011–2019: from Haut Les Mains! to "La Chicotte des Léopards" ===
In 2011, Wazekwa released his 10-track maxi-single titled Haut Les Mains! on compact disc and Digital Video Disc, but after its debut, Haut Les Mains! was pirated and broadcast clandestinely at Place de la Victoire, one of Kinshasa's primary venues.

In May 2012, during an interview with Radio Okapi, Wazekwa said his eleventh album, Adamu Na Eva ("Adam and Eve"), would be released soon. He said the name was meant to show that all people are equal despite variances in complexion, ethnicity, and dialect. He also said he worked on the album with rhythm guitarist Simaro Lutumba. By July 2013, Wazekwa said Adamu Na Eva was nearly complete. The videos were already done, and he was now looking for trusted distribution companies both domestically in Kinshasa and internationally, so it would not be handled by corrupt producers. Adamu Na Eva was officially released through Foundation Wazekwa on 19 September 2013, with 10 tracks. He later promoted it with a live performance alongside Cultur'A Pays Vie at the Pullman Kinshasa Grand Hôtel on 30 November, followed by a concert in Kongo Central at the Ledya Hotel in Matadi. He later performed in Brazzaville with Cultur'A Pays Vie at the Ledger Plaza Maya Maya hotel, and later returned to Kinshasa for a performance at the Venus Hotel in Gombe.

Wazekwa began working on his 13-track twelfth studio album, I Love You, in early 2014 in Kinshasa. During this time, he also performed at the Marché de la Liberté on 13 June 2014, and at the Bralima-sponsored Primus Fete de la Musique event at the Théâtre de Verdure in Ngaliema. On 20 December, he released the lead single "Bouffez-Moi Tout Ça" in Paris. The full album came out on 3 January 2015, and he presented it with a live show at the Foire Internationale de Kinshasa the next day.

On 5 September 2015, Wazekwa issued the ndombolo-infused single "Fimbu". The term fimbu means "whip" in Lingala and is associated with the colonial past in Central Africa, though it remains in contemporary use. In the song, however, it refers to a festive dance called the "fimbu chicotte", in which dancers mimic gently whipping an opponent as part of a celebration, especially after scoring. In an interview with Radio Okapi, Wazekwa said the song was intended to speak against injustice and violence toward women. He added that offenders "deserve to be reprimanded", that the dance movements resemble "correcting a person with a sprain", and that this concept "could also apply to football".

The song quickly became a hit, especially with fans of the Congolese national football team, nicknamed Les Léopards (meaning "the Leopards"). Because of its popularity, Wazekwa was invited to perform in Luanda at Cinema Atlântico on 10 October. The "fimbu chicotte" dance spread across Africa in the lead-up to the 2016 African Nations Championship and later became a sleeper hit during the 2017 Africa Cup of Nations, when Les Léopards used it to celebrate goals. It also made Wazekwa well known in Europe, especially among the continent's diaspora in Belgium and France.

On 1 April 2017, Wazekwa released the audio for "Debout Africains", a remixed version of "Fimbu" with an educational theme promoting African unity. The song includes parts of the Congolese national anthem and uses lyrics in English, Swahili, and French. On 16 December, Wazekwa premiered the single "Papa Wemba - Le Prince de la Rumba", as a tribute to Papa Wemba. This was succeeded by "Icône d'Afrique", a tribute to Simaro Lutumba. On 15 June 2019, he came out with "La Chicotte des Léopards" for the 2019 Africa Cup of Nations to support Les Léopards.

=== 2020–present: Article 23 and standalone releases ===
In December 2019, Wazekwa released his thirteenth studio double album titled Article 23, which included guest appearances by Barbara Kanam and Héritier Watanabe. It was produced by Foundation Wazekwa and consisted of 24 tracks. On 14 December, he premiered the eponymous ndombolo-infused lead single, which emulated Charlie Chaplin's Tramp character with shouts, notably "Charlie Chaplin Charlot!" and accompanied by a dance where the entire Cultur'A Pays-Vie imitated Chaplin's on-screen persona.

On 24 December 2020, Wazekwa released the lyric video for his English-inflected single "It's My Call". He followed up with "Miliki", a song in which Wazekwa extols his partner, likening her to the cherished milk of his childhood. On 14 July 2021, he debuted "Kilelo", a cover compilation of the most successful songs of notable Congolese musicians, including JB Mpiana, Werrason and Jossart N'Yoka Longo. On 17 March 2022, Wazekwa released the single "Leopards Fimbu International" in support of Les Léopards during the play-off phase for the 2022 FIFA World Cup African qualifiers. The track featured guest appearances by Flaety W. Manuke, Lokua Kanza, Kadiyoyo, JB Mpiana, Barbara Kanam, Koffi Olomide, Cindy Le Cœur, Héritier Watanabe, Laetitia Lokua, Adolphe Dominguez, Werrason, Lemiran LEM, Kristy Diamond, Ferré Gola, and Innoss'B.

Wazekwa participated in the sixth anniversary of Papa Wemba's passing alongside his family, A'Salfo, Reddy Amisi, Cathérine Kathungu Furaha, and Viva la Musica. On 25 June, Wazekwa published the single "Épaisseur", followed by "Entrepreneuriat" featuring Jossart N'Yoka Longo, which urges Congolese people to engage in entrepreneurial activities. On 3 February 2023, he collaborated with his erstwhile rival Koffi on the Congolese rumba-infused single "Eau Pure", a year after their reconciliation ended years of conflict that had characterized the Congolese music scene. He then appeared with Cindy Le Coeur on stage alongside Koffi during her concert at Millionaire Club in Kinshasa.

On 12 July, Wazekwa premiered "Tik Tok", featuring a guest appearance by Fabregas Le Métis Noir. He subsequently performed at Stade des Martyrs with Fabregas Le Métis Noir, becoming one of the few Congolese artists to grace the stage at the venue. On 30 September, Wazekwa performed alongside Ferré Gola, JB Mpiana, Werrason, Héritier Watanabe, and Fabregas Le Métis Noir at Stade Tata Raphaël during the "Célébrons le Héros" mega musical event, which expressed gratitude to President Félix Tshisekedi for the successful organization of the 2023 Jeux de la Francophonie held in Kinshasa.

== Discography ==
=== Studio albums ===
- Tétragramme, YHWH (1995)
- Pauvres, Mais… (1997)
- Bonjour Monsieur (1998)
- Sponsor (1999)
- Signature (2001)
- Yo Nani ? (2002)
- Et Après... (2004)
- Faux Mutu Moko Boye (2005)
- Que Demande Le Peuple? (2008)
- Mémoire ya Nzambe (2010)
- Adamu Na Eva (2013)
- I Love You (2015)
- Article 23 (2020)
- De Mi Vida (2025)
- Fimbu Champions (2026)

=== Maxi-singles ===
- Mosapi Liboso (2006)
- La chèvre de Monsieur Seguin (2009)
- Haut les mains (2011)

=== Collaborations ===
- Haut de Gamme/Koweït, rive gauche (with Koffi Olomidé, 1992)
- Noblesse Oblige (with Koffi Olomidé, 1993)
- Foridoles (with Papa Wemba, 1994)
- Pole position (with Papa Wemba, 1995)
- Mi Corazon (album Pauvres, mais...) (Collaboration with Johann Frot, 1997)
- Stop à la guerre ! (Simaro Lutumba, Innoss'B, Fally Ipupa, Jean Goubald Kalala, King Kester Emeneya, Barbara Kanam, M'bilia Bel, MJ30, Papa Wemba, Koffi Olomidé, etc., 2012)
- 7 Ans (with Nix'xon, 2020)

== Awards and nominations ==
Year	Event	Prize	Recipient	Result	Ref.
1995	ACMCO	Best Revelation of the Year	Himself	Won	
2001	CHADA	Best Artist	Himself	Won	
2001	CHADA	Best Group	Cultur'A Pays-Vie	Won	
2001	ACMCO	Best Composer	Himself	Won	
2001	ACMCO	Best Artist	Himself	Won	
2001	ACMCO	Best Orchestra	Cultur'A Pays-Vie	Won	
2001	Kora Awards	Best Male Artist of Central Africa	Himself	Nominated	
2004	Kora Awards	Best Male Artist of Central Africa	Himself	Won	
