= Island Africa Talent =

- Genre: TV
- Created by: Emmanuel Le Juez & Olivier Louyot Universal Music Group

Production
- Producer: Code films Universal Music Group

Original release
- Network: A+ (Canal+ Africa)

Island Africa Talent is a television music competition franchise created by French producers Emmanuel Le Juez and Olivier Louyot to find new talents in African French countries. The winner of the show earns a contract with the African franchise of Universal Music Group along with 5 000 000 FCFA. The first series of the show aired on A+, a channel of the Canal + Africa Group and various local channel, from October 24 to December 12 of 2014.

== Creation and production ==
Island Africa Talent is the first African-wide talent competition and was created to promote new African talents and to witness the creation of the African franchise of Universal Music Group. Live shows stage took place in Yamoussoukro in Côte d'Ivoire and is watched nearly by 200 million people.

== Participating countries ==
Series	Country	Network
Series 1	Democratic Republic of the Congo	Digital Congo RDC / B-One RDC
Series 1	Republic of the Congo	DRTV Congo Brazzaville
Series 1	Chad	ONRTV Chad
Series 1	Burkina Faso	RTB Burkina
Series 1	Niger	ORTN Niger
Series 1	Seychelles	SBC Seychelles
Series 1	Madagascar	MA TV Madagascar
Series 1	Côte d'Ivoire	RTI Côte d'Ivoire
Series 1	Senegal	TFM Senegal
Series 1	Benin	ORTB Benin
Series 1	Togo	LCF Togo
Series 1	Cameroon	CRTV Cameroon
Series 1	Gabon	Gabon TV

== Judges and presenters ==
Series	Judges	Presenters
Series 1	David Monsoh; Didier Awadi; Barabara Kanam	
Series 1	David Monsoh; Didier Awadi; Barabara Kanam	Iance Yves de M'Bella Juliette Fievet (backstage)

== Selection process ==
=== Countries audition ===
Auditions took place in the 12 participating countries; selected one act to represent each country at the live shows.

=== Live shows ===
During the live shows only the grades given by the judges determines the rankings, and during the first five weeks there are no eliminations. From week 5, the 3 contestants who received the lowest cumulative grade over the weeks are eliminated each week. Live shows took place during seven weeks.

== Winners and finalists ==
Series	Rank	Finalist
Serie 1	Winner	Madagascar - Deenyz
Serie 1	Runner-Up	Cameroon - Danielle
Serie 1	Third Place	Democratic Republic of the Congo - Bill
