= Capital participation =

Form of equity sharing

Capital participation (sometimes also called equity participation or equity interest) is a form of equity sharing not restricted to housing, in which a company, infrastructure, property or business is shared between different parties. Shareholders invest in a business for profit maximization and cost savings, e.g., through tax deduction. A visible and controversial form of capital participation can be found in public–private partnerships in which the private sector invests in public projects and usually receive a time-limited concession for ownership or operation to make profits from the acquired property.

== See also ==
- Risk capital
- Angel investor
- Shareholder
- Profit sharing
- Private equity
- Takeover
- Mergers and acquisitions
- Privatization
