= Banlieuz'Art =

Guinean hip-hop group

- Genres: Hip-hop, Rap, mamaya
- Label: Meurs Libre Prod (MLP)

Banlieuz'Art (Abbreviated BLZ) is a Guinean hip-hop group from Conakry. Formed in 2004, it is composed of two members: Konko Malela (A.K.A. Marcus) (née Abdoul Aziz Bangoura) and Soul Dag'One (A.K.A. King Salamon) née Souleymane Sow.

== History ==
=== Debut ===
Banlieuz'Art was discovered in 2009 after their participation in the project Urban Afreeka with the song Police. While Urban Afreeka sought to unearth acts promoting urban music in Guinea, BLZ were hired for the quality of their composing, as well as the fact that they already had a following, which allowed them to carry out their first album.

=== Koun Faya Koun ===
Two consecutive shows were organised in Conakry (Guinea), February 14, 2010, at the Palais du Peuple. Koun Faya Koun is a phrase from the Quran which recounts the creation of the Universe by Allah (Let it be, and it was).

Hoping to be a voice for the voiceless, Marcus and King Salamon play a musical style mixing afro-reggae, afro-folk, dancehall and afro-rap. Their songs, with lyrics that are aware, engaged and activist, are translated into malinké, Susu, Fula, wolof, French and English.

== Discography ==
=== Albums ===
2013: Koun Faya Koun, by Marcus and King Salam (Meurs Libre Prod)

1. Faya Man
2. Ntanto Soussa
3. Death Will Let Nobody
4. Yandi Wonki
5. Life is so Hard
6. Assingué
7. SOS
8. The Day Will Come
9. Ghetto Youth
10. Ko Ma Bourama
1. Faya Man
2. Ntanto Soussa
3. Death Will Let Nobody
4. Yandi Wonki
5. Life is so Hard
6. Assingué
7. SOS
8. The Day Will Come
9. Ghetto Youth
10. Ko Ma Bourama
1. Kobena Wati
2. Emou Nöma
3. Maniamba
4. N'kanou
5. Fewdhârè
6. Khori
7. Interlude Wokeli
8. Andé
9. J'aimerais
10. Mikhi Kobi
11. Kanlanké
12. Gnakhui
13. Moumoki
14. KonKon

2018: Kalanké, Koun Faya Koun, by Marcus and King Salaman (Urban Connexion)

1. Kobena Wati
2. Emou Nöma
3. Maniamba
4. N'kanou
5. Fewdhârè
6. Khori
7. Interlude Wokeli
8. Andé
9. J'aimerais
10. Mikhi Kobi
11. Kanlanké
12. Gnakhui
13. Moumoki
14. KonKon

=== Singles ===
- Degg J Force 3 and Banlieuz'Art : in support of the Guinea National Football team during the Africa Cup of Nations before January 17 to February 8, 2015, in Equatorial Guinea, the group Degg J Force 3 featuring with Banlieuz'Art released a single Gbin Gbin Soo.
- Admiral T, Degg J Force 3 et Banlieuz'Art : Put Your Hands Up is a project of Banlieuz'Art, Admiral T and Degg J Force 3 released in march, 2015 with the Guinean label Meurs Libre Prod.
- Serge Beynaud and Banlieuz'Art : title Téri Ya,
- Eddy Kenzo and Banlieuz'Art : title Kon kon
- Viviane Chidid and Banlieuz'Art : title Lon Kelen

== Bibliography ==
- (en) Nomi Dave, The Revolution’s Echoes: Music, Politics, and Pleasure in Guinea, University of Chicago Press, 2019, 208 p. ISBN 9780226654775
- (en) Chérie Rivers Ndaliko, Samuel Anderson, The Art of Emergency, Oxford University Press, 2020, 352 p. ISBN 9780190692322
- (en) Bram Posthumus, Guinea: Masks, Music and Minerals, Oxford University Press, 2016, 256 p. ISBN 9781787381179
