= Chantal Safu =

DR Congo politician

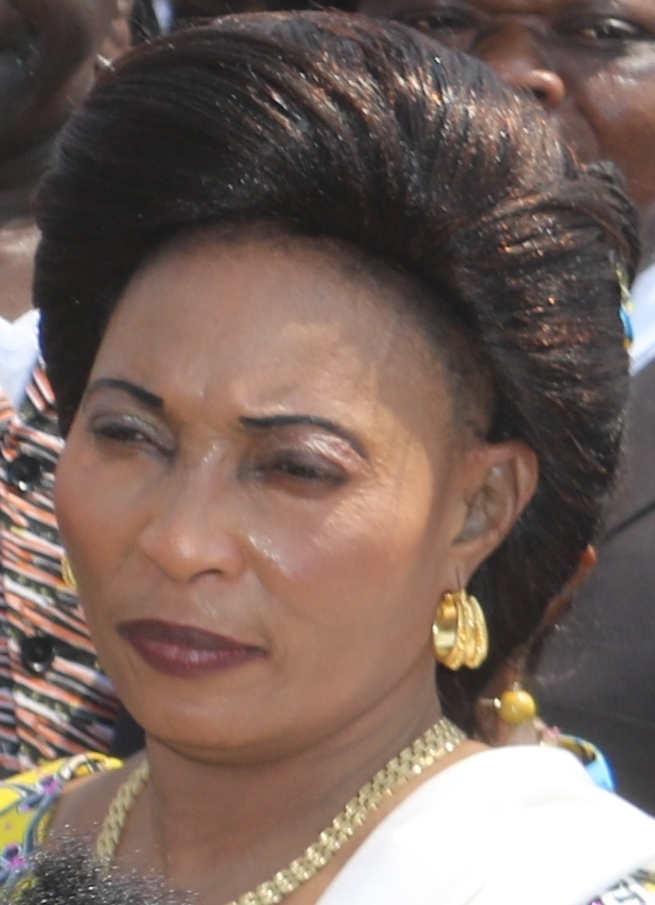
Safu in 2018

Chantal Safu (or Safou ) Lopusa is a former public official in the Democratic Republic of the Congo. She was Minister for Gender, Children and the Family until 9 September 2019 when she was replaced by Béatrice Lumeya.
