= SOBEDI =

- Founded: Unknown
- Founder: Fernand Janssens
- Defunct: 1969
- Genre: Various
- Country of origin: Belgium
- Location: Brussels, with additional facilities in Ghent

SOBEDI (a contraction for Société Belge du Disque) was a prominent Belgian record company and manufacturer established by Fernand Janssens. Headquartered in Brussels, with ancillary facilities in Ghent for pressing, plating, and printing, SOBEDI played a significant role in the European and Congolese music industries. The company operated multiple record labels, including Olympia (alternatively styled as Disques Olympia, Olympia Platen, and sporadically Discos Olympia), NewTone Records, Beffroi-Halle Toren-Belfry, Kongo Bina, Lomeka, Piccolo, Regina, Rythme, Metrophone, and Novelty. These labels featured recordings by a diverse range of European—predominantly Belgian—and Congolese artists.

SOBEDI expanded its reach internationally through partnerships, including representation by London Records of Canada Ltd. in Canada and Pathé Marconi EMI in France. Beyond its proprietary labels, SOBEDI rendered pressing services for numerous record companies, such as Artone, CBS Records International, Polydor Records, and Ronnex Records. SOBEDI's operations extended to music publishing under its subsidiary, Fonogram, and distribution through its entity, Cobedi SA (Consortium Belge du Disque).

== History ==
SOBEDI's founding date remains uncertain, but it was first described in the 1840 edition of Belgium's Annuaire officiel: Officieel jaarboek by the Ministère des Affaires Africaines as a company specializing in music record publishing, recording, and manufacturing sound recordings. Other sources attribute its founding to Belgian entrepreneur Fernand Janssens, though the exact date remains unknown.

In 1935, the company expanded its operations by acquiring a pressing and printing plant at Waalse Krook in Ghent, previously owned by Chantal and later Edison Bell following Chantal's bankruptcy in 1932. SOBEDI's flagship label, Olympia, became synonymous with its recording activities and lent its name to the Olympia Studio in Brussels, where its recording operations were based. Frans Verbeeck served as the label's A&R manager, overseeing artist and repertoire decisions.

=== Post- World War II expansion and the African Series ===
After World War II, SOBEDI capitalized on renewed travel opportunities between Belgium and its colony, the Belgian Congo. Fernand Janssens brought a portable direct-to-disc recording machine to Léopoldville (modern-day Kinshasa), where SOBEDI technicians recorded traditional and emerging modern Congolese musicians. These recordings, including performances by Antoine Wendo Kolosoy and his Victoria Kin, Orchestre Odéon Kinois, Camille Feruzi, the Chanteurs à la Croix de Cuivre (singers of the copper cross, from the mines in Katanga), and even a Lingala language course, were pressed into 78 RPM records in Ghent under Olympia's African Series and related labels Kongo Bina and Lomeka. While initially targeted at Belgian audiences, these records gained significant popularity in the Belgian Congo itself. Olympia's success in the Belgian Congo revealed a burgeoning market for African music, supported by Léopoldville's rapid urban growth and increasing sales of gramophones. By 1948, Olympia's catalog boasted over 200 recordings. SOBEDI established connections with local music ventures, including a partnership with Loningisa, providing recording equipment and pressing their releases in Belgium. However, its operations in Léopoldville ceased shortly before Congolese independence in 1960.

=== Later years ===
In 1969, SOBEDI was acquired by Brussels-based SA Fonior NV and was reorganized under Sobelpress SA, alongside SA Fabeldis and Discopress. EW Pelgrims de Bigard became the new president, while Georges Martens continued as executive manager. SOBEDI's studio at Boulevard Lemonnier, established in 1945 with a Universal Microphone Company cutting lathe and Charles Monsieur as its technician, remained active until at least 1974 under chief engineer Pierre Neirinckx. The last known reference to SOBEDI's Ghent plant as a separate entity dates to 1973.
