= Island Africa Talent series 1 =

Island Africa Talent
- Series 1
- Hosted by: Iance Yves de Mbola; Juliette Fievet
- Judges: David Monsoh; Barbara Kanam; Didier Awadi
- Winner: Deenyz
- Runner-up: Danielle
- Location: Yamoussoukro

Release
- Original network: A+ (Canal + Africa Group) and local TV
- Original release: 24 October – 12 December 2014

Island Africa Talent is an africanwide singing competition. The first series aired on A+ and 13 local TV all over African French countries and was presented by Iance Yves de Mbola. The judging panel is composed by music producer David Monsoh and singers Barbara Kanam and Didier Awadi. 12 countries were represented in this series and on December 12, 2014 Deenyz, representing Madagascar, won over Danielle from Cameroon after seven weeks of competition to be crowned the first winner of the show after seven weeks of competition.

== Auditions ==
David Monsoh travelled all over the 12 participating countries, with the help of local judges to find the act that will represent each country to the Live Shows. The auditions aired in the same night as the first Live Show on October 24, 2014.

== Finalists ==
Key:

– Winner
– Runner-up
– Third place

| Country | Finalist |
|---|---|
| Madagascar | Deenyz |
| Cameroon | Danielle |
| Democratic Republic of the Congo | Bill |
| Niger | Binta |
| Republic of the Congo | Eved |
| Rwanda | Kevin |
| Mali | Koité |
| Chad | Aimé |
| Senegal | Boubacar |
| Gabon | Amly |
| Cote d'Ivoire | Nadège |
| Seychelles | Keshia |

== Live Shows Summary ==
| Acts | Week 1 | Week 2 | Week 3 | Week 4 | Week 5 | Week 6 | Week 7 | Final |
|---|---|---|---|---|---|---|---|---|
| Deenyz | 1st | 1st | 1st | 1st | 1st | 2nd | 2nd | Winner |
| Danielle | 6th | 3rd | 4th | 5th | 4th | 1st | 1st | Runner-Up |
| Bill | 8th | 6th | 3rd | 3rd | 5th | 3rd | 3rd | 3rd Place |
| Eved | 3rd | 2nd | 6th | 4th | 3rd | 4th | 4th | Eliminated |
| Kevin | 4th | 9th | 9th | 7th | 8th | 6th | 5th | Eliminated |
| Binta | 7th | 4th | 2nd | 2nd | 2nd | 5th | 6th | Eliminated |
| Koité | 2nd | 7th | 5th | 6th | 7th | 7th | Eliminated | |
| Aimé | 9th | 9th | 7th | 7th | 7th | 8th | Eliminated | |
| Boubacar | 8th | 8th | 9th | 10th | 9th | 9th | Eliminated | |
| Nadège | 5th | 5th | 8th | 8th | 10th | Eliminated | | |
| Amly | 9th | 10th | 10th | 9th | 11th | Eliminated | | |
| Keshia | 8th | 11th | 11th | 11th | 12th | Eliminated | | |
