= Seguin =

Seguin or Séguín is a French and Gascon name. It may be a Frankish name, from Germanic origin (sig-, that is, "victory", cf. modern German sieg, and -win, that is, "friend", related to modern English "win"). Seghin, Sigiwinus, Siguvinus, Siguinus, Siguin, Sigiwin, Sigwin, Sigoin and Segouin are alternate variants. According to Jean de Jaurgain quoting primary source Saint Andrew of Bordeaux, the original Vascon name written in Latin was Sihiminum, related to Basque Seme(no), meaning 'son' (cf. ancient Aquitanian Basque "seni" meaning 'boy' > modern "sehi"). It is also spelled Scimin, Skimin, Scemenus, Semen, Semeno, Xemen, or Ximen and gave rise to the Castilian Ximeno and Jimeno. Both Semen and Seguin, unrelated names, are found in sources.

== First name ==
- Seguin I of Gascony, Duke of Gascony from 812 until 816
- Seguin II of Gascony (died 846), Count of Bordeaux and Saintes from 840 and Duke of Gascony from 845, son or grandson of Seguin I
- Seguin de Badefol (1330–1366), French mercenary leader during the Hundred Years' War, who fought at the Battle of Brignais
- Seguin de Lugny, Bishop of Mâcon (see Ancient Diocese of Mâcon) from 1242 to 1262
- Sigwin von Are (died 1089), Archbishop of Cologne

== Surname ==
- Albert Séguin (1891–1948), French gymnast and 1924 Olympic champion
- Armand Séguin (1767–1835), French chemist and physiologist
- Armand Séguin (painter) (1869–1903), French post-Impressionist painter, great-grandson of the above
- Arthur Seguin (1809–1852), English/American operatic bass singer
- Charles Avila Séguin (1883–1965), Canadian lawyer and politician
- Dan Seguin (born 1948), Canadian retired National Hockey League player
- Édouard Séguin (1812–1880), French physician and educationalist
- Erasmo Seguín (1782–1857), politician and supporter of the Texas Revolution
- Fernand Seguin (1922–1988), Canadian biochemist, professor and radio and television host of science programs
- François Séguin, Canadian award-winning production designer, art director and set decorator
- Juan Seguín (1806–1890), Tejano hero of the Texas Revolution
- Julianne Séguin (born 1996), Canadian singles and pairs figure skater
- Lisbeth Gooch Séguin (1841-1890), English writer
- Marc Seguin (1786–1875), French engineer and inventor, whose name appears on the Eiffel Tower, as a supporter of the project
- Marc Séguin (painter) (born 1970), French-Canadian painter and novelist
- Napoléon Séguin (1865–1940), French-Canadian politician
- Nicolas Seguin (born 1990), French footballer
- Patrick Seguin (born 1954), French art dealer
- Paul-Arthur Séguin (1875–1946), French-Canadian politician
- Paul Seguin (born 1995), German professional footballer
- Philippe Séguin (1943–2010), French politician
- Richard Séguin (born 1952), Canadian musician
- Tyler Seguin (born 1992), Canadian National Hockey League player
- Wolfgang Seguin (born 1945), East German association footballer
- Yannick Nézet-Séguin (born 1975), Canadian conductor
- Yves Séguin (born 1951), French-Canadian politician

== Places ==
- Seguin, Texas, named for Juan Seguín
