= Equity sharing =

Property ownership for tax and profit

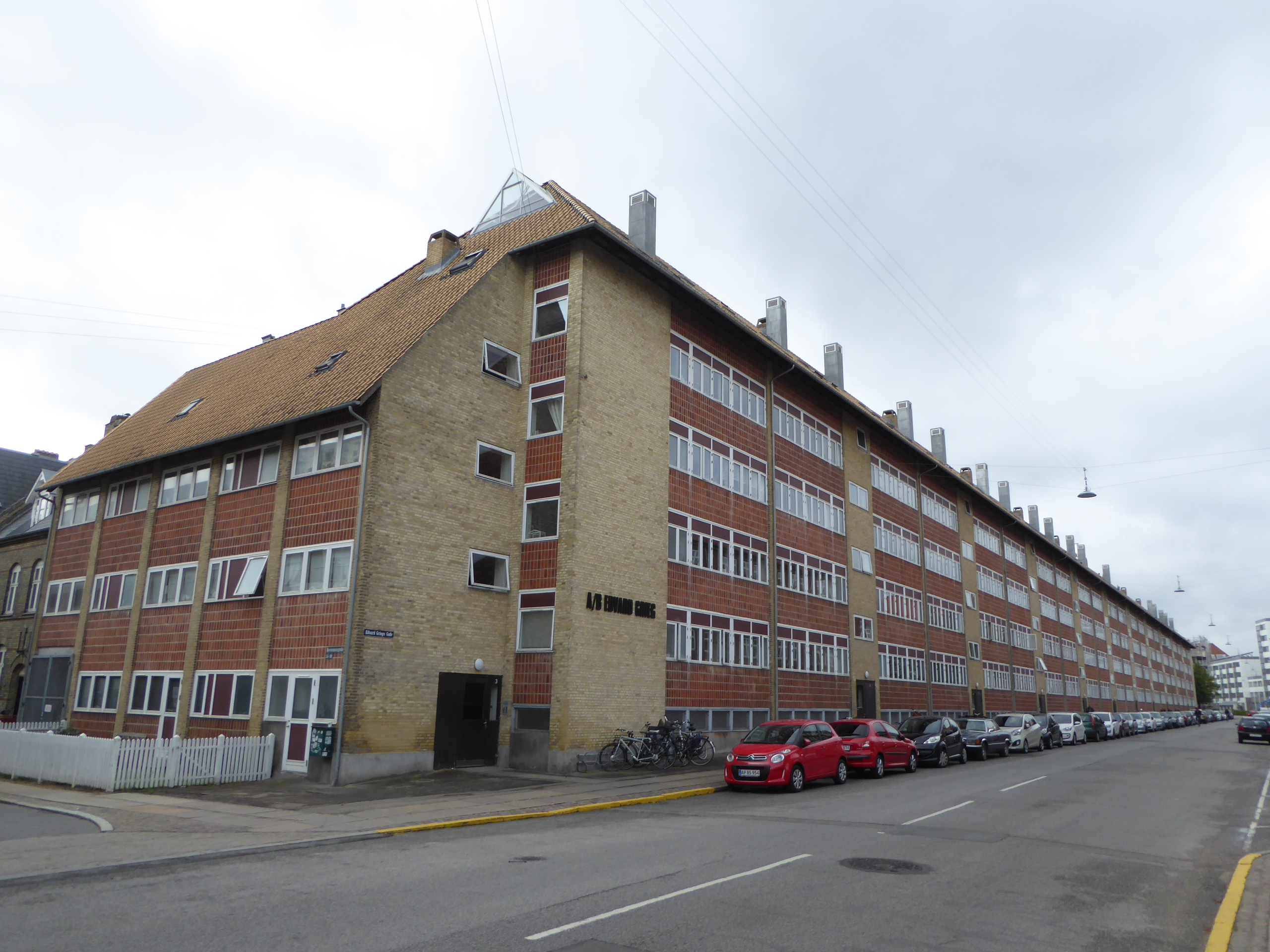

Equity sharing is another name for shared ownership or co-ownership. It takes one property, more than one owner, and blends them to maximize profit and tax deductions. Typically, the parties find a home and buy it together as co-owners, but sometimes they join to co-own a property one of them already owns. At the end of an agreed term, they buy one another out or sell the property and split the equity. In England, equity sharing and shared ownership are not the same thing (see the United Kingdom and England sections below).

== Equity sharing in different countries ==
=== United States ===
Equity sharing became desirable in the United States when in 1981 Section 280A of the Internal Revenue Code allowed mixed tax use of a single property for the first time permitting the occupier to claim principal residence tax deductions and the investor to claim investment property tax deductions. Since shared ownership is conferred by the federal tax code, this ownership vehicle can be used in any state.

Companies in the United States include Unison Homeownership Investors, Landed, and OwnHome Mortgage & Finance.

=== United Kingdom ===
There are many uses of the term "Equity Sharing" in the UK, often applied to different forms of Low Cost Home Ownership schemes. These include equity loans, sometimes referred to as Equity Sharing Loans, and some forms of Shared Ownership (part buy/part let) leasehold schemes being referred to as an Equity Sharing Lease. Some local authorities may also refer to resale price restrictions under planning documentation as being Equity Sharing arrangements. However, the use of shared equity in reference to shared ownership is inaccurate, because shared ownership is not ownership, but is in fact an assured tenancy under the terms of the Housing Act 1988. With a shared equity scheme you own all of the property, albeit you have a loan on a part of your deposit – whereas with a shared ownership scheme you do not own the share you bought, but instead have the chance to buy the full lease from the landlord in the future, if you can afford to do so.

==== England ====
The UK government facilitates shared equity chiefly through the Homes and Communities Agency. As of 2009 this was under the banner of HomeBuy. This aims to help households earning up to £60,000 p.a.

New Build HomeBuy is where purchasers buy at least 25% of a newly built home, and pay rent on the remainder. The HCA generally subsidises housing associations or other providers to hold the remaining share. The rent is capped at 3% of the value of the unsold share, but typically set at 2.75%. Purchasers may buy additional shares whenever they can afford to do so; this is known as "staircasing".

HomeBuy Direct was introduced in 2009, under which the government and a housing developer jointly fund an equity loan of 30% of the valuation, so that the purchaser only needs to pay a mortgage on 70% of the value. If the purchaser buys an additional share, all three parties participate in any increase in value. The HCA allocated £300 million to the scheme for 2009—2011, and 10,000 homes are available under the initiative.

Open Market Homebuy allowed purchasers to buy at least 25% of a property on the open market, with a conventional mortgage on that part, and a low-interest loan on the remainder. This is not currently available as the funding for 2009-10 has already been fully committed.

Social Homebuy allows tenants of participating Councils and housing associations to buy their rented home on shared ownership terms, with a proportion of the usual Right to Acquire discount.

FirstBuy was a scheme for first-time buyers announced in the 2011 Budget. Under it first-time buyers can get help to fund the difference between a 5% deposit and a 75% mortgage. It was only available on selected newbuild schemes. The top-up equity was provided in equal shares by the HCA and the developer.

=== Private sector shared equity in England ===
Private sector shared equity or, as it is sometimes known, investor shared equity, operates quite differently in that there is no element of taxpayer subsidy. Instead, third party investors provide the difference between the buyer's deposit and (typically) a 75% mortgage, in return for an equity stake in the property and a rent. These schemes are run over 5 or 10 years (sometimes with a 'hardship' extension), meaning that at the end of the relevant period, the owner has to buy out the equity stake at the relevant percentage of the then market value. There is generally no penalty on early redemption or partial buy-backs. Thus, equity sharing can be seen as a step up to full ownership of a property.

Although investor shared equity is, on the face of it, more expensive than public sector schemes, because of the need to pay rent on the non-owned portion, it nevertheless holds significant advantages:

- First, it is not confined to newbuild, or to any particular housing provider. Instead, the buyer can research the whole of the market for the best bargain. Some would say this avoids the peril of paying an inflated price to a housebuilder.
- Secondly, there is less in the way of form filling and waiting lists. Because investor shared equity is essentially a financing mechanism, it is as simple as applying for a mortgage.
- Thirdly, it is less likely to run out of funding than public sector schemes. So long as investors achieve their desired return, the resources are theoretically limitless.
- Fourthly, the buyer is put in the position of a cash buyer and is thus empowered to negotiate the best deal with the vendor.
- Finally, of course, an injection of cash gives the buyer the chance to access the better interest rates and lighter credit checks associated with 75% mortgages.

== Economic theory ==
In economic theory, ownership is studied in the field of contract theory. Specifically, Oliver Hart (1995) has argued that ownership matters in the context of incomplete contracts. When some future contingencies cannot be taken care of in a contract today, then negotiations will take place tomorrow. Ownership improves the bargaining position in these negotiations. As a result, today an owner has stronger incentives to make relationship-specific investments (i.e., the hold-up problem is mitigated). In this framework, Schmitz (2017) has shown that shared ownership of an asset can be desirable today, even though tomorrow it is optimal to give the asset to the party who values it most. The reason is that shared ownership yields more balanced investment incentives of the involved parties. The optimal ownership shares depend on whether the investments are embodied in the physical capital (so that the owner can always seize the returns) or in the parties’ human capital.

== See also ==
- Housing cooperative
- Community land trust
