= List of Democratic Republic of the Congo singers =

This is a list of Congolese singers.

== A ==
- Cor Akim

== B ==
- Céline Banza
- Patsha Bay
- M'bilia Bel
- Gibson Butukondolo

== C ==
- Cindy Le Coeur

== E ==
- Lucie Eyenga

== K ==
- Kanda Bongo Man
- Mike Kalambay
- Lokua Kanza
- Kaysha
- Josky Kiambukuta
- Wendo Kolosoy

== L ==
- Laurette la Perle
- N'Yoka Longo
- Awilo Longomba
- Vicky Longomba
- Malage de Lugendo

== M ==
- M'Pongo Love
- Nathalie Makoma
- Abeti Masikini
- Fabrice Mbuyulu
- Marie Misamu
- Madilu System
- Réjane Magloire
- Sam Mangwana
- Jessy Matador
- Moise Mbiye
- Mohombi
- Bouro Mpela
- Tshala Muana
- Dena Mwana

== N ==
- Nyboma Mwan'dido (Nyboma)

== O ==
- Koffi Olomide
- Bimi Ombale
- Jimmy Omonga

== R ==
- Tabu Ley Rochereau

== T ==
- Alicios Theluji

== W ==
- Papa Wemba
- Werrason

== Y ==
- Dindo Yogo

== See also ==
- Music of Democratic Republic of the Congo
