= List of Democratic Republic of the Congo musicians =

This is a list of musicians and musical groups from the Democratic Republic of Congo (formerly Zaire).

- Abeti Masikini
- African Fiesta
- Aurlus Mabélé
- Avelino
- Awilo Longomba
- Bimi Ombale
- Bouro Mpela
- Bozi Boziana
- Cindy Le Coeur
- Dadju
- Damso
- Dany Engobo
- Evoloko Jocker
- Diblo Dibala
- Dindo Yogo
- Fabregas
- Fally Ipupa
- Ferré Gola
- Fulu Miziki
- Gaz Mawete
- Gibson Butukondolo
- Grand Kalle
- Héritier Watanabe
- Innoss'B
- Iyenga
- Jean Bosco Mwenda
- Jessy Matador
- Jimmy Omonga
- Josky Kiambukuta Londa
- Kalash Criminel
- Kanda Bongo Man
- Kasai Allstars
- Kaysha
- Keblack
- Kékélé
- King Kester Emeneya
- Koffi Olomide
- Konono Nº1
- Kasaloo Kyanga
- LU Kala
- Langa Langa Stars
- Le Grand Kalle
- Lokua Kanza
- Madilu Système
- Maître Gims
- Marie Daulne
- Marie Misamu
- Mayaula Mayoni
- Mbongwana Star
- M'bilia Bel
- Michel Boyibanda
- Mohombi
- Mose Fan Fan
- M'Pongo Love
- Naza
- Ndombe Opetum
- Nico Kasanda
- Ninho
- Papa Wemba
- Pepe Kalle and Empire Bakuba
- Ray Lema
- Sam Mangwana
- Singuila
- Tabu Ley Rochereau
- Tshala Muana
- Werrason
- Youlou Mabiala
- Yxng Bane
- Youssoupha
