= Soleil Wanga =

Congolese musician

Roi Soleil Wanga is a DR Congolese recording artist, musician, vocalist and entertainer. His birthday is on the 20th March. He was a member of the musical band Quartier Latin International, formed and led by Congolese musician and songwriter Koffi Olomide. In the production Inchallah, Wanga is the third person to sing his solo, behind Fally Ipupa, Bouro Mpela, but ahead of Montana Kamenga, Gibson Butukondolo and Deo Brando.

== Discography ==
- Roi Soleil Wanga Discography

== See also ==
- Koffi Olomide
- Fally Ipupa
- Bouro Mpela
- Ferre Gola
- Gibson Butukondolo
- Cindy Le Coeur
- Montana Kamenga
- Deo Brando
- Quartier Latin International
