= Montana Kamenga =

- Born: DR Congo

Montana Kamenga is a DRCongolese recording artist, musician, vocalist and entertainer. At one time, he was a member of the musical band Quartier Latin International, formed and led by Congolese musician Koffi Olomide. In the production Inchallah, Kamenga is the fourth person to sing his solo, behind Fally Ipupa, Bouro Mpela and Soleil Wanga, but ahead of Gibson Butukondolo and Deo Brando.

== Discography ==
- Montana Kamenga Discography

== See also ==
- Koffi Olomide
- Fally Ipupa
- Bouro Mpela
- Ferre Gola
- Gibson Butukondolo
- Cindy Le Coeur
- Soleil Wanga
- Deo Brando
