= Ikea (song) =

Single by Koffi Olomide and Quartier Latin International

from the album Bord Ezanga Kombo
- Language: Lingala, French and Kikongo
- Released: 7 August 2008
- Studio: Studio N'diaye (Gombe, Kinshasa)
- Genre: Congolese rumba
- Length: 9:32
- Label: Diego Music
- Songwriter: Koffi Olomide
- Producer: Diego Lubaki

Koffi Olomide singles chronology
"L'eau-l'eau-l'eau" (2008)	"Ikea" (2008)	"Plat Favori" (2008)

"Ikea" is a song by Congolese singer-songwriter Koffi Olomidé, featured on his sixteenth solo studio album, Bord Ezanga Kombo, released in 2008. Performed chiefly in Lingala with additional passages in French and Kikongo, it is a Congolese rumba love ballad written by Koffi and primarily performed by him alongside Cindy Le Coeur and Quartier Latin International. The song narrates the emotional distress of a young woman who suffers heartbreak and betrayal at the hands of her fiancé. After release, "Ikea" received a mixed commercial reception. Alongside several other tracks from Bord Ezanga Kombo, the song was temporarily banned on 23 January 2009 by the National Commission for the Censorship of Songs and Performances (CNCCS) due to alleged obscenities in the lyrics and accompanying music videos. The censorship was officially lifted a month later, on 23 February 2009.

== Background and production ==
In 2007, Koffi encountered gospel soprano singer Cindy Le Coeur, then a member of the Waasa Group (groupe Waasa), at Studio N'diaye in Gombe, Kinshasa. At the time, Koffi was seeking a female vocalist for his song "Lily Kaniki". Impressed by her vocal talent, he invited her to join his band, Quartier Latin International, appointing her as artistic director. She would go on to play a significant role in the production of several projects, including the album Bord Ezanga Kombo. It was during this collaboration that Koffi gave her the stage name "Cindy Le Coeur", meaning "Cindy the Heart".

"Ikea" was written by Koffi and released in 2008 as part of Bord Ezanga Kombo, his sixteenth solo studio album, through Diego Music.

== Composition and lyrical analysis ==
Musically, the song is characterized by a slow Congolese rumba rhythm, melodic layering, and call-and-response vocals between Cindy and Koffi, supported by the ensemble performance of Quartier Latin International. The song is primarily performed in Lingala, with additional lyrics in French and Kikongo. Lyrically, "Ikea" is a narrative-driven song that depicts a dramatic lament about romantic betrayal, emotional pain, and societal pressures surrounding love and marriage. It is delivered as a monologue from a woman who has been abandoned by her fiancé after many years of waiting. Her lament features metaphorical language and cultural idioms, such as "All my childhood chances vanished from waiting" and "Menopause is near, when will you marry me?" which define her sense of urgency and despair as her hopes for marriage diminish. The narrative also contrasts her sorrow with accusations of deception and materialism, portraying her former partner as having abandoned her for another woman after achieving wealth and status.

Throughout the song, the word "bolingo" (Lingala for "love") recurs as a central motif, appearing in several verses such as "bolingo' ekomi na l'air" ("love has evaporated into the air") and "bolingo' na yo intemporel" ("your love is timeless"). However, the song does not portray love in its ideal or noble form. Instead, it reflects what critics have described as eros love, a sensual, flawed, and disillusioned form of romantic engagement, often marred by emotional manipulation and physical desire. Cultural commentators argue that the lyrics cross the line from emotional expression to obscenity, diminishing love to a mere tool for erotic fantasy and sabotaging traditional values of dignity and respect. Music analyst Didier Nzuzi described the lyrics as "barely veiled or explicitly crude", asserting they "constitute an affront to morals when broadcast publicly". Additional criticism has come from sociologists, cultural scholars, and civil society representatives, who see the song as indicative of a broader cultural change. They argue that such portrayals of love distort youth perceptions, particularly in a society where sex education remains insufficient. Commentators such as Yangandou El Guapo have accused Koffi of promoting "musical pornography", while Georges Ebanda Lububu has called for a reaffirmation of African moral and cultural values in the face of Western cultural influence.

== Reception ==
"Ikea" received a mixed reception upon its release, yielding both popular attention and cultural controversy. Although some audiences connected with its emotionally charged lyrics, it also faced considerable criticism from cultural commentators and moral watchdogs. On 23 January 2009, the Commission nationale de censure des chansons et des spectacles (CNCCS) imposed a temporary ban on "Ikea" and several other tracks from Bord Ezanga Kombo, citing alleged obscenities in both the lyrics and accompanying music videos. The decision was met with debate in the media and music circles. The ban was lifted one month later, on 23 February 2009.

== Personnel ==
- Koffi Olomidé – songwriting, vocals
- Cindy Le Coeur – vocals
- Quartier Latin International – vocals
- Diego Lubaki – producer
- GuyIain Tamba, Mbetenge Domingo, Philippe Guez – arrangers
- Olivier Tshimanga – acoustic guitarist
- Binda Bass, Flavien Makabi – bass guitarists
- Eric Bardeau, Guylain Tamba, Hubert Salou, JP Kyss Kyungu Ngoy, Jacky Reggan, Nicolas Stawski, Philippe Brun, Pierre-Alexandre Favriel, Pinosse, Stéphane Briand, Sébastien Gohier – engineers
- Adrien Levallois, Anaël Train, Khoï Huynh, Nicolas Atlan, Steven, Vincent Carlo, Yves Saint-Léon – assistant mixing engineers
- Jirés Synthé, Maïka Munan – keyboardists
- Felly Tyson, Mbetenge Domingo, Pathy Moleso – lead guitarists
- Mavungu, Nseka Kudifelela – percussionists
- Bourman Idolo, Mbetenge Domingo – rhythm guitarists
- Gesac Tshipoyi, Mbuji Mayi, Mukusa Ya Mbwa, Pepic Mbasu, Ségolène Royal, Tourbillon Mbaka – atalakus
