= Laurette la Perle =

Congolese singer (b. 1990)

- Born: Laurette Ngoma la Perle; February 2, 1989 (age 36); Kinshasa, Zaire
- Genres: Afrobeats RnB Congolese rumba
- Occupation: Singer songwriter
- Instrument: Vocals
- Years active: 2005–present
- Labels: Brown Touch Music

Laurette Ngoma Laperle (born February 2, 1989), known professionally as Laurette la Perle is a Congolese singer songwriter, model and business woman from Democratic Republic of the Congo.

== Biography and career ==
At the age of 8 she started to attend the classical parish of her neighborhood, the practice in the choir allowed her to participate in certain shows, parties and competitions. In 2000 she was selected among the best singers of her city. She was born to a mother who was a nurse and father who was a doctor who already died.

== Awards and nominations ==
1. 2015: MTV Africa awards for the best francophone.
2. 2016: Afrima Awards for best female from central Africa.

== Discography ==
=== Albums ===
- 2015: Love story
- 2018: Love net

=== Singles ===
- Gigolo
- Siska
- Terminus
- Love story
- Sur mesure
- Follow me

== See also ==
- Fally Ipupa
- Koffi Olomide
- Ferre Gola

== Collaboration ==
- "Venus" (Single 2015) ft Bana C4
- "Chaise Électrique (Remix) ft Fally Ipupa
- Tribute to Koffi Olomide and Ferre Gola
