= Rose Mhando =

Tanzanian musician

Rose Muhando
- Born: 29 July 1976 (age 50); Kilosa, Morogoro, Tanzania
- Citizenship: Tanzania
- Occupations: Tanzanian gospel singer, songwriter, and choreographer, choir teacher
- Mother: 3 Children
- Awards: Honorary Award (ICON AWARD)

Rose Muhando (born 29 July 1976) is a Tanzanian gospel singer, songwriter, and choreographer. She is among the prominent gospel artists in East and Central Africa. Some of her best known songs include: Mteule Uwe Macho, Yesu Nakupenda, Nipishe Nipite (Nakuuliza Shetani), Nibebe, Utamu Wa Yesu, Ndivyo Ulivyo, Hatumo, Wololo, Secret Agenda, Nipe Number (Number), among others. She has been described by the public and media as the queen of gospel music in East and Central Africa.

== Life and career ==
Muhando was born and grew up in Kilosa, Morogoro, Tanzania. Her career started in 2005 when she won several awards. She got a Sony Music deal in 2011. In the mid-2010s, she faced controversies and struggles that led her to move to Kenya, but has made a comeback, releasing music and receiving accolades. In 2012, she released her fourth studio album Utamu wa Yesu, after signing a record deal with Sony Music Africa, the first gospel singer in East and Central Africa to do so. With her fourth studio album, Muhando sold both physical and digital copies of the album and singles, making the album the most played in all of East and Central Africa.

With this album she toured in Tanzania, Kenya, Uganda, Rwanda, Burundi, Mozambique, Senegal, DR Congo, Congo, South Africa, Malawi, and other African countries.

After suffering from mental health due to violence by her former management, she received treatment in Nairobi, Kenya and after a break came back with another hit, Yesu Karibu Kwangu (2019). In 2020 she released another album, Miamba Imepasuka.

Muhando released another album in 2022, Secret Agenda, breaking records of streams, views and sales in East and Central Africa's gospel music industry with the title track one of the most played songs in radios and television in the region in 2022 and 2023.

In 2024 she released an EP, Amefanya, with six songs. In 2025 following gaining popularity in TikTok, she released another version of her hit "Amina", a single from her 2008 album Jipange Sawa Sawa.

In 2025, Muhando was given an honorary award (ICON AWARD) in the Tanzania Gospel Music Awards. In the 2025 East Africa Gospel Music Awards, Muhando won four awards including Best Praise Artist of The Year in East Africa, and was given the honorary award of Best Legendary Female Gospel Artist of East Africa.

In July 2026 she surprised released another studio album Zamani Zile honoring swahili hymns and traditional gospel chorus sung back in the 1980s to 1990s and early 2000s.

Muhando is considered the best-selling gospel singer of all time (both physical and digital) in East and Central Africa with over 25 million units of records in the region. Muhando is also considered the best-selling female artist of all time (all genres) in Tanzania. She is the best-selling artist of all time in Tanzania based on overall sales (physical and digital copies).

== Personal life ==
Muhando, a former Muslim and mother of three, claims to have seen a vision of Jesus Christ while indisposed on her sick bed at the age of nine, having suffered for three years, after which she was healed and later converted to Christianity.

== Discography ==
- Uwe Macho (2004)
- Kitimutimu (2005)
- Jipange Sawasawa (2008)
- Nyota ya Ajabu (Christmas Album) (2011)
- Utamu Wa Yesu (2012)
- Yesu Kung'uta (2013)
- Kamata Pindo La Yesu (2014)
- Mungu Anacheka (2015)
- Nampenda Yesu - EP (2017)
- Jitenge Na Lutu - EP (2017)
- Miamba Imepasuka (2020)
- Secret Agenda (2022)
- Amefanya - EP (2024)
- Zamani Zile (2026)

=== Awards ===
- 2005 Tanzania Music Awards: Best Female Vocalist & Best Religious Song ("Mteule uwe macho")
- 2009 The Best Tanzanian Gospel Singer Awards: Rose Mhando; The Best Singer in Tanzania, awarded Tsh 200,000 by Tanzania Broadcasting Corporation TBC under the umbrella of her song "Nibebe"
- 2008 Kenya Groove Awards - Best Female Gospel Artist in Africa.
- ICON AWARD at the 2025 Tanzania Gospel Music Awards for her legendary service in music and career.
- Rose Muhando has more than 50 Awards and Certificates for her service in Music.
