= Sony Music Africa =

Record label in Africa

Sony Music Entertainment Africa
- Parent company: Sony Music Entertainment
- Founded: 1991; 35 years ago
- Country of origin: South Africa
- Location: Johannesburg, South Africa
- Official website: store.sonymusic.co.za

Sony Music Entertainment Africa (SMEA) is a record label, based in Africa, a subsidiary of Sony Music.

== History ==
Sony Music in Africa has a rich history intertwined with the global evolution of Sony Music Entertainment. Founded in 1991, Sony Music Entertainment Africa is the local arm of Sony Music, which was established as American Record Corporation in 1929 and later rebranded to Columbia Recording Corporation.

Over the years, Sony Music has expanded its presence in Africa, including South Africa, with offices in Johannesburg and Cape Town. The company's strategic growth in Africa involves opening offices in key markets like Lagos, Nigeria, and Nairobi, Kenya, to promote local talent globally.

== Subsidiaries ==
=== South Africa (Sony Music South Africa) ===
South Africa is one of the largest and most influential music markets in Africa. Sony Music South Africa is based in Johannesburg and serves as the hub for Sony Music Africa's operations in the region. The division works with a diverse range of artists across different genres, including amapiano, pop, hip-hop, house, and traditional South African music.

=== Nigeria (Sony Music West Africa) ===
Nigeria is another major music market in Africa, known for its vibrant Afrobeat, Afropop, and hip-hop scenes. Sony Music West Africa, based in Lagos, Nigeria, focuses on discovering and promoting Nigerian talent both within Africa and internationally. The division collaborates with artists, producers, and record labels to develop and distribute music across various platforms. Godwin Tom was appointed as its first managing director.

=== Kenya (Sony Music East Africa) ===
Kenya has a thriving music industry with diverse influences from traditional African music, Afro-fusion, and contemporary pop. Sony Music East Africa, based in Nairobi, Kenya, works with local artists and labels to amplify Kenyan music on both regional and global scales. The division also supports artist development and distribution efforts within the East African region appointing Christine Mosha as its head of marketing.

=== Ghana ===
Ghana has emerged as a significant player in the African music scene, particularly in genres like highlife, hiplife, and Afrobeats. Sony Music Ghana, based in Accra, collaborates with Ghanaian artists, producers, songwriters and music industry stakeholders to showcase the country's musical talent to the world. The division also facilitates partnerships and collaborations between Ghanaian artists and international counterparts.

== Partners ==
- Afrochella
- Audiomack
- Bridges for Music Academy
- Digital Music Commerce & Exchange (DMCE)
- Boomplay
- Celebrity Services Africa (CSA)
- The Women of Music Business (Womb)
- WatsUp TV
- Starnews Mobile Côte d'Ivoire
- MTN Group

=== Record Labels ===
- Rockstar4000
- EMB Inc
- Gallo Record Company
- Cloud 9ne Entertainment

== Artists ==
Former Members

- Alikiba – Tanzania
- AKA – South Africa
- Baraka The Prince
- Lady Jay Dee - Tanzania
- Rose Muhando - Tanzania
- Shine4 – South Africa

Current Members

- Aslay – Tanzania
- Gyakie – Ghana
- Abby Chams – Tanzania
- TiTi Owusu – Ghana
- M.O.G Beatz – Ghana
- Young Lunya – Tanzania
- Ommy Dimpoz – Tanzania
- Tresor – Democratic Republic of the Congo
- Ferré Gola – Democratic Republic of the Congo
- D'banj – Nigeria
- Kwesta – South Africa
- Black Motion – South Africa
- Zakwe – South Africa
- The Soil – South Africa
- Zonke – South Africa
- Shekhinah – South Africa
- 25k – South Africa
- Mayorkun – Nigeria
- Dice Ailes – Nigeria
- Mr JazziQ – South Africa
