= Deli Kongoli =

- Also known as: The Great Maestro
- Born: Mzee Deli Kangoli Mbayirwa; 30 June 1964 (age 62); Butembo, North Kivu, Democratic Republic of the Congo
- Died: 10 December 2025 (aged 61) Kampala, Uganda
- Genres: Traditional Yira Mirembe folk music of the (Congolese Nande and Ugandan Konjo peoples)
- Occupations: Musician, songwriter, and sound engineer
- Instruments: Guitar and singing

Mzee Deli Kongoli Mbayirwa (30 June 1964 – 10 December 2025), known professionally as Deli Kongoli, was a Congolese musician and singer. His primary instrument was a guitar. He is also known as "The Great Maestro."

== Early life ==
Kongoli was born in the Centre Hospitalier Mama Musayi (Mama Musayi Central Hospital) in the city of Butembo, North Kivu, Democratic Republic of the Congo (DRC) on 30 June 1964.

== Career ==
Kongoli often performed in his home city of Butembo alongside fellow artist, Étienne Kasereka, and his band, Nande Révélation (Nande Revelation). Believing his role as an artist to "passive[ly]" describe contemporary stories of everyday life, Kongoli wrote of familial and gender dynamics.

Kongoli helped organize the national "Africa Amkeni" festival, held on 28 June 2025. He explained that the patriotic festival, receiving 184 applications from across the DRC, aimed to celebrate the contributions of Congolese people Africa and the world.

== Cultural influence ==
Kongoli was hailed as a "mentor," "legend," and "icon" of Yira Mirembe folk music. Following his death, tributes were made in his honor.

== Death ==
On 7 October 2025 fellow musician Popal Isse Vossi reported that Kongoli and his wife fell ill in Butembo, where he was transferred between multiple medical facilities to no avail. The Butembo musicians' association appealed to the local community for monetary support. Kongoli, however, was not working for approximately six months prior as both Kongoli and his wife were bedridden. Thanks to the efforts of the community and a generous benefactor, the President of the Union for the Development of Lubero Butembo-Beni, Musa Muke Vwakyananda, announced Kongoli was transported from the Adventist church in Butembo to the Mulago National Specialised Hospital in Kampala, Uganda on 15 October. He began receiving medical treatment on 16 October. In his last public statement, given from his hospital bed in Kampala, Kongoli said:

French: Juste un grand merci, une grande reconnaissance. Là, je vois que les gens me portent encore dans le cœur et ça me réconforte. En tout cas, je remercie tout le monde et je dis que Dieu bénisse tout le monde et que Dieu les rende centuple ce qu’ils m’ont donné et que Dieu me rende la santé. Que je puisse, dans les deux semaines, dans les deux mois, revenir en bonne santé pour continuer à chanter notre culture. Les meilleurs soins sont les plus chers, et ça demande vraiment une concentration sérieuse et beaucoup de moyens. Merci déjà parce que nous avons commencé par le grand laboratoire de Kampala. Ça prend déjà presque le budget qu’on avait déjà au départ.

[Just a huge thank you, a huge thank you. I see that people still hold me dear, and that comforts me. In any case, I thank everyone and say may God bless everyone and may God repay them a hundredfold for what they have given me, and may God restore my health. May I be able, within two weeks, within two months, to return in good health to continue singing our culture. The best care is the most expensive, and it really requires serious focus and a lot of resources. Thank you already because we started with the large laboratory in Kampala. It's already taken up almost the entire budget we had initially.]

— Deli Kongoli

Kongoli died on the morning of 10 December 2025 at the age of 61. His death was confirmed by fellow artist, Popal Isse Vossi. Kongoli's body was brought to Matanda Hospital morgue on 12 December. His eucharistic requiem mass was held on 13 December at the Immaculate Heart of Mary Parish in the Kitatumba neighborhood in his home city of Butembo, headed by Assumptionist Father Wilfrid Kimbanda and six other priests. A highly attended funeral procession followed the pallbearers which carried his casket to his eventual place of burial, located in Cimetière Kitatumba (Kitatumba cemetery). Prominent figures and members of his biological families paid final tributes.

== See also ==
- Musicians of the Democratic Republic of the Congo
- Music of the Democratic Republic of the Congo
- Nande language
