= Alicios Theluji =

Congolese recording artist

- Born: 1987 (age 38–39); Goma, North Kivu, Democratic Republic of the Congo
- Citizenship: Congolese
- Education: Blekinge Institute of Technology (BSc in Economics); Unstated Institution in Sweden (MSc in Business Management)
- Occupations: Singer-songwriter; record producer; economist
- Years active: 2011—present
- Musical career
- Origin: Goma, Democratic Republic of the Congo
- Genres: Congolese rumba; R&B; afrobeats
- Instruments: Vocals; DAW; sampler

Alicios Theluji (last name pronounced Ze-loo-gee), (born in 1987), is a Congolese recording artist, based in Nairobi, Kenya. She sings in both Swahili and Lingala, but also fluent in English and French.

== Background and education ==
She was born in Goma, in the eastern part of the Democratic Republic of the Congo in 1987, to "Jacky Kahara Laini" and a father who was a businessman. Her mother was a singer and tailor. Theluji's father died in an automobile accident when she was four years old.

The family, which included Theluji, two siblings and their mother, relocated to Kinshasa, the capital and largest city in DR Congo. In 1993, when she was six years old, the family visited Kenya, but they returned to DR Congo. In 1996, when the First Congo War that removed Mobutu Sese Seko from power broke out, the family took refugee in Nairobi.

Alicios attended St. Mary's Academy, Nairobi for her high school education. She then left Kenya to attend Blekinge Institute of Technology, where she graduated with a Bachelor of Science in Economics. She also holds a Master of Science in Business Management from an institution in Sweden.

== Career ==
Alicios recorded her first song Mpita Njia, in 2011 and released it in 2012, when she was still an undergraduate. The song, was composed and written by herself, it featured vocals from the Ugandan performing artist Juliana Kanyomozi. Alicios maintains a successful solo-recording career, with collaboration from other leading East African artists on some of the records. She now spends lot of her time in Sweden where her mother and step-sister also live.

In 2017 Alicios signed a recording deal with Kenya's Biggest Record label Taurus Musik which is also a label for Lady Jaydee Alicios Theluji is the mother of one son called Kito, born circa 2015. His father is also DR Congolese, the two met when she was 13 years old.

== See also ==
- Cindy Le Coeur
- M'bilia Bel
- Nathalie Makoma
