= Willy Dumbo =

Ivorian TV host (born 1987)

- Born: Missinhoun Emmanuel Wilfried; 1987 (age 38–39); Abomey, Benin
- Occupations: Television presenter; comedian; singer
- Years active: 2012–present

Willy Dumbo, birth name Missinhoun Emmanuel Wilfried, is an Ivorian comedian, singer and television presenter, born in 1987. He is the host of the show "Willy à Midi," or "WAM," on Life TV.

== Biography ==
Willy Dumbo is the eldest son in a family of three children. He is Ivorian of Beninese origin and has lived in Ivory Coast since his childhood. He grew up in Abidjan, specifically in the Sicogi district in the commune of Koumassi.
