= Tshala Muana =

Congolese singer and dancer (1955–2022)

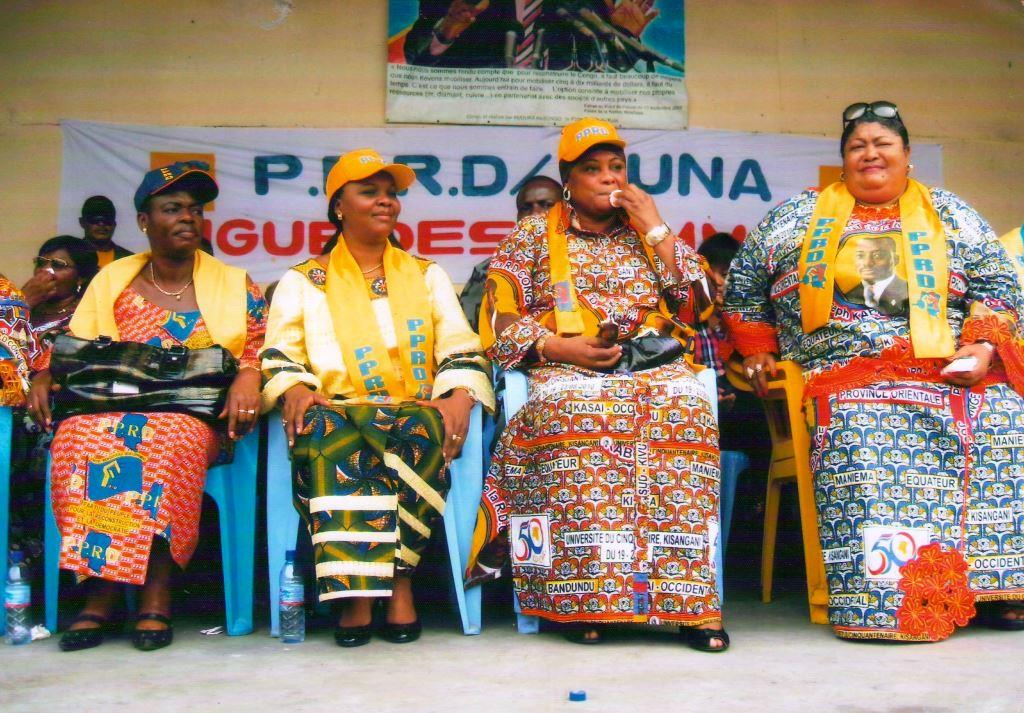
- Tshala (second from right) in Kinshasa in 2014

Background information
- Born: Élisabeth Tshala Muana Muidikay; 13 March 1958; Élisabethville, Belgian Congo
- Died: 10 December 2022 (aged 64) Kinshasa, Democratic Republic of Congo
- Genres: Soukous, Congolese rumba, Mutuashi
- Occupation: Singer-songwriter
- Instrument: Vocals
- Labels: Charly Records, Shanachie Records, Celluloid Records

Élisabeth Tshala Muana Muidikay (13 March 1958 – 10 December 2022), known professionally as Tshala Muana, was a singer and dancer from Congo-Kinshasa. Considered the "Queen of Mutuashi", a traditional dance music from her native Kasai region, she is often called "Mamu National".

== Early life ==
Tshala Muana was born on 13 March 1958, in Lubumbashi, Belgian Congo, present day Democratic Republic of Congo. She was the second of ten children of Amadeus Muidikayi, a soldier, and Alphonsine Bambiwa Tumba, a housewife.

In 1964, when Muana Muidikay was 6 years old, her father was murdered. She was raised by her mother, who died in 2005.

== Career ==
Muana started her artistic career as a dancer for the musical band Tsheke Tsheke Love in 1977 before turning to singing. She is famous for several songs such as "Karibu Yangu". She toured widely overseas, won several awards on the national, continental and global scene and recorded over 20 albums. Her music has appeared in the soundtrack of the popular 1987 Congolese musical film La Vie est Belle and Aya of Yop City .

== Personal life ==
In November 2020, Muana was arrested by the National Intelligence Agency (ANR), reportedly for her song "Ingratitude", which was interpreted by many to be a veiled criticism of President Felix Tshisekedi, toward his former mentor and predecessor, President Joseph Kabila. The singer was a public supporter of former President Joseph Kabila and his party, the People's Party for Reconstruction and Democracy (PPRD).

== Death ==
In June 2020 she was rumored to have died, but was instead hospitalized after having suffered a stroke.

On 10 December 2022, Tshala Muana died in Kinshasa, at the age of 64. Musician Deli Kongoli mourned her death, honoring her as a "monument in the promotion of Luba music."

== Discography ==
=== Albums ===
- 1982: Kangungu
- 1983: Tshala Muana à Paris [volumes 1 to 4]
- 1984: Tshala Muana
- 1985: M'Pokolo
- 1985: Kami
- 1988: Nasi Nabali
- 1988: La Divine
- 1988: Biduaya
- 1989: Munanga
- 1990: Tshibola
- 1990: Mady
- 1990: Tshala Muana Dans Un Duo Pour L'Éternité With Papa Wemba
- 1991: The Flying Star
- 1994: Ntambue
- 1996: Mutuashi
- 1999: Pika Pende
- 2003: Malu
- 2004: Tshanza
- 2007: Tshikuna Fou
- 2009: Sikila
- 2016: Lunzenze

=== Singles and EPs ===
- 1981: "Amina" / "Tshebele"
- 1987: "Antidote"
- 1988: "Karibu Yangu"
