= Quartier Latin International =

Congolese musical group

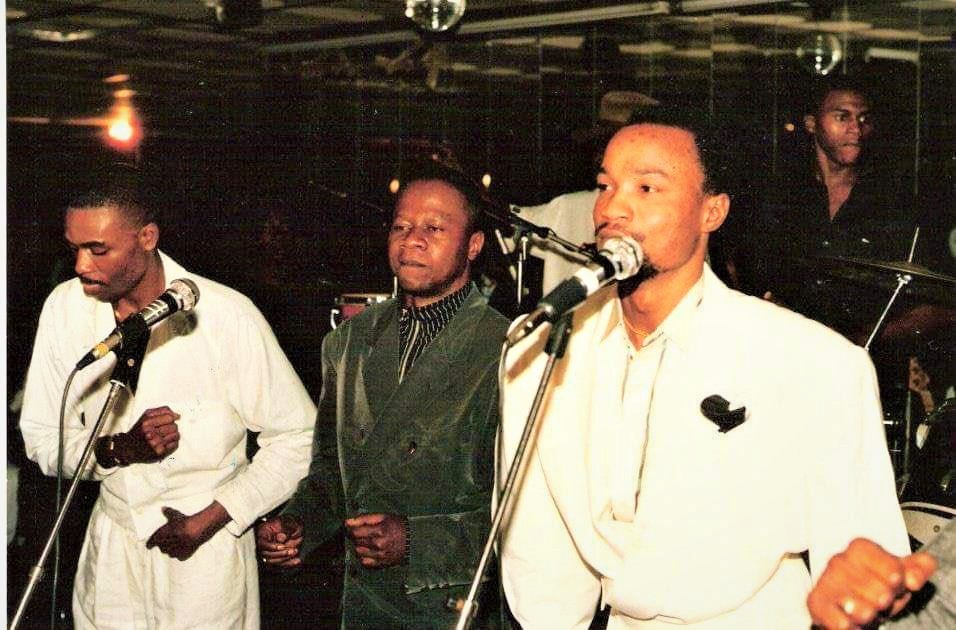
- Koffi Olomide and Papa Wemba, 1988

Background information
- Also known as: Quartier Latin
- Origin: Democratic Republic of the Congo
- Genres: Congolese rumba, ndombolo and soukous
- Years active: 1986—present
- Labels: SonoDisc; Sonima; Obouo Music; Koffi Central

Quartier Latin International (QLI), or Quartier Latin, is a soukous band from the Democratic Republic of the Congo established in 1986.

== Location ==
The band was formed in 1986 in Kinshasa. It plays in the Democratic Republic of the Congo and other African countries, and often tours in Europe and North America.

== Overview ==
The band was founded by its leader, composer, guitarist, vocalist, dancer and entertainer, Koffi Olomide. The band performs both in Lingala and French languages. Since its creation, many members have left and joined the band, some multiple times. Many former band members still maintain good relations with the band. A show commemorating the group's 30th anniversary took place on 16 November 2016. The chief organizer was Fally Ipupa, who left the band in 2006.

=== Group Member Musicians (Quartier Latin International) ===
- Singer/Singers
  - Éric Tutsi - since 1993,2003,2011,2014,2025
  - Omba Lipassa - since 2007,2025
  - Cindy Le Coeur - since 2007 "Director-Artistic"
  - Baby Azembi - since 2008,2019
  - Mayassé Mbongi - since 2010
  - JR Nkondia - since 2013
  - Saint Cowboy - since 2014
  - Erick Mwayila - since 2014
  - Cabriolet Mpasa - since 2019
  - Narcisse Soleil - since 2019
  - Ozil Bariton - since 2023
  - Inconnu - since 2024
  - Inconnu - since 2024
  - Inconnu - since 2024
- Animators
  - Bébé Kerozène - since 2001,2004,2024 "Vice-Président"
  - Mukusa Ya Mbwa - since 2004, 2016
  - Ordinateur Rodrigue - since 2009
  - La Montagne Muhemba - since 2018
- Guitarists/Bassists
  - Flash Mangili (Rythmic, Solo, Mi-Solo) - since 2010
  - Yannick Stockan (Mi-Solo, Solo) - since 2011, 2017
  - Volcan Muketonga (Solo, Mi-Solo) - since 2013 "Bandmaster"
  - Glove Matuvanga (Mi-Solo, Solo, Rhythmic) - since 2013
  - Zapo Accompagnero (Rythmic) - since 2014
  - Éric Bass (Basse) - since 2019
  - Zaventem Bass (Basse) - since 2019
- Drummers
  - Sclack Masamba - since 2008
  - Suira Mundelu - since 2009
- Percussionists
  - Olivier Epondo - since 2013
  - Kirikou Mbonda - since 2014
- Synthétizers
  - Verveck Kalonji - since 2014
  - Noël Sentestar - since 2015
- Dancers
  - Mamie Itanzoma - since 2003,2006,2011,2025 "Leaders"
  - Falonne Sifa - since 2014,2019,2025
  - Sissi Bomboko - since 2015,2023 "Deanery"
  - Creta Kembi - since 2016
  - Naomi Mavungu - since 2017
  - Irène Botongo - since 2019
  - Inconnue - since 2022
  - Inconnue - since 2022
  - Inconnue - since 2022
  - Inconnue - since 2023
  - Inconnue - since 2023
  - Inconnue - since 2023
  - Inconnue - since 2023
  - Inconnue - since 2024
  - Inconnue - since 2024
  - Inconnue - since 2024
  - Inconnue - since 2024
- Dancer
  - Landry Japonais - since 2005, 2022

=== The Old Musicians ===
- Singer/Singers
  - Mascot De Katalas, from 1986-1987
  - Marie-Paul Kambulu, from 1986-1987
  - Eldorado Claude, from 1986-1993
  - Djunafa Makengele, from 1986-1992
  - Aladji Makenga, from 1986-1994
  - Texaba Elonga, from 1986-1992
  - Laudy Demingongo Plus-Plus, from 1988-1993
  - Anibo Panzu, from 1989-1991
  - Suzuki Luzubu, from 1989-1998, Returned from 2006-2009
  - Acouda Nzuzi, from 1991-1992
  - Nana Sukali, from 1991-1993
  - Willy Bula, from 1991-1997
  - Chou Lay Evoloko, from 1993-1994
  - Babia Ndonga Chokoro, from 1993-2001, Returned from 2003-2011 (Deceased)
  - Modogo Abarambwa, from 1993-1999, Returned from 2005-2007
  - Tusecoze Azuray, from 1993-1997 (Deceased)
  - Sckola Miel Whitney, from 1993-1994
  - Sam Tshintu, from 1994-1999
  - Thomas Lokofé, from 1995-1996
  - Pompon Miyaké, from 1995-1996
  - Biva Ray, from 1995-1999
  - Bouro Mpela, from 1996-1999, Return from 2000-2004, 2006-2007, 2015-2016
  - Mamale Tupac, from 1996-2001
  - Depitsho Savanet, from 1998-2000
  - JF Ifongé, from 1998-2000
  - Jipson Butukondolo, from 1998-2008
  - Roi-Soleil Wanga, from 1999-2007
  - Jordan Kusa, from 1999-2005
  - Sarbatino Batracien, from 1999-2001, returned from 2006-2008
  - Arca Dinheiro, from 1999-2012
  - Chikito Mutakatif, from 1999-2001
  - Marcel Bakenda, from 1999-2000
  - Christian Samba, from 1999-2000
  - Spino Ladjatence, from 1999-2001
  - Fally Ipupa, from 1999-2006
  - Mustapha Gianfranco, from 1999-2000
  - Lola Mwana, from 1999-2003
  - Bendo Son, from 1999-1999
  - Bagain Baguino, from 1999-2000 (Deceased)
  - Paparazzi Thoto, from 2000-2001 returned from 2002-2003
  - Montana Kamenga, from 2000-2008
  - Chamberton Dix, from 2000-2003 (Deceased)
  - Deo Brando, from 2001-2004
  - Junior Kingombe, from 2002-2006 returned from 2007-2009 (Deceased)
  - Asso Ferrari, from 2002-2009, returned 2011-2014, 2018-2022
  - Tonton Lay Evoloko, from 2003-2004
  - Chella Mputu, from 2004-2008
  - Mirage Supersonic, from 2004-2006 returned from 2007-2008
  - Ferré Gola, from 2005-2006
  - Général TV5, from 2005-2013 (Of Group Quartier Latin Mineurs)
  - DVD Mangani, from 2005-2008, Returned from 2010-2014, 2015-2018 (Of Group Quartier Latin Mineurs)
  - Zoé Bella, from 2006-2007
  - De Campo, from 2006-2012
  - Tony Ambrosio, from 2006-2008
  - Rolly Mayemba, from 2006-2007 (Of Group Quartier Latin Mineurs)
  - Guelord Mon Ami, from 2006-2013 (Of Group Quartier Latin Mineurs)
  - Scottie Pippen, from 2006-2008 (Of Group Quartier Latin Mineurs)
  - Bapinces Leader, from 2006-2007 returned from 2011-2012, 2022-2023
  - Deplick Pomba, from 2006-2007 (Of Group Quartier Latin Mineurs)
  - Arabe Youssouf, from 2006-2011 (Of Group Quartier Latin Mineurs)
  - Pentagone, from 2006-2008 (Of Group Quartier Latin Mineurs)
  - Niawu Ndoki, from 2006-2007 (Of Group Quartier Latin Mineurs)
  - Pitshou Malela, from 2006-2008 (Of Group Quartier Latin Mineurs)
  - Picharme Mpaka, from 2006-2007 (Of Group Quartier Latin Mineurs)
  - MJ 30, from 2007-2008
  - Joss Diena, from 2007-2009
  - Gabbana Tatshou, from 2007-2009
  - Jitrois Galliano, from 2007-2010
  - Edo Dollar, from 2008-2015
  - Egueson Mbuanga, from 2008-2011 (Deceased)
  - Baby Adumanisa, from 2008-2014 returned from 2019-2025
  - Jimmy Adoli, from 2009-2010
  - Prince, from 2009-2010
  - Alitsheur Amouly, from 2010-2014
  - Danny Kulé, from 2010-2014
  - David Love, from 2011-2014
  - Faboson Zouma, from 2011-2015
  - Ronsard Kanza, from 2012-2014
  - Zadio Multiplicateur, from 2014-2018
  - Lindalala Sprada, from 2014-2023
  - Fabrizio Mayela, from 2014-2020
  - Smoke Mamba, from 2014-2015
  - Papa Kanza, from 2014-2017
  - BB Jitrois, from 2016-2023
  - Abel De Charme, from 2016-2017, returned from 2022-2024
  - Chikito Makinu, from 2017-2018
  - Yannick Dindo, from 2019-2019 returned from 2022-2025
  - Hervé De Lille, from 2022-2025
  - Bobby Ronaldinho, from 2022-2023
  - Blana Mosaka, from 2022-2024
  - Ngando Batomene, from 2025-2025
- Animators :
  - Jean-Louis Manzungidi, from 1988-1995 (Deceased)
  - Beevens Rappason, from 1993-1998, Returned from 1999-1999, 2015-2016
  - Dolce Parabolique Somono, from 1995-1999
  - Mbochi Lipasa, from 1996-1999, Returned from 2005-2008
  - CNN Alligator, from 1998-2001, Returned from 2003-2005
  - Bidjana Vangu , from 1999-2000
  - Océan Zibankulu, from 1999-2000 (Deceased)
  - John Scotch, from 2000-2001
  - Petit Reagan Chirac, from 2000-2001 (Deceased)
  - Molayi Magidi, from 2000-2001
  - Washington Libango, from 2000-2001, Returned from 2002-2004
  - Brigade Sarbaty, from 2001-2004, Returned from 2004-2006
  - Acide Wanzambi, from 2003-2005
  - Apocalypse Mobuka, de 2003-2006, Returned from 2013-2015
  - Golbert Napoléon, from 2004-2006
  - Pépic Mbassu, from 2006-2009 (Of Group Quartier Latin Mineurs)
  - Mbuji Mayi, from 2006-2008 (Of Group Quartier Latin Mineurs)
  - Tourbillon Mbaka, from 2006-2009 (Of Group Quartier Latin Mineurs)
  - Gesac Tshipoyi, from 2007-2010
  - Ségolène Royal, from 2007-2008 (Of Group Quartier Latin Mineurs)
  - Rossignol Anerori, from 2009-2010
  - DVD Mokonzi, from 2009-2012
  - Abdoulaye Le Lion, from 2009-2016
  - Masamuna Fiston, from 2010-2011
  - Touareg Mushakarente, from 2010-2010
  - Trésor Nzinga, from 2011-2015
  - Equaliseur Boseko, from 2012-2013
  - Aspirine Atalaku, from 2012-2016
  - Petit Maniango, from 2013-2017
  - Rapison Atalaku, from 2013-2014
  - Kirikou Kadeo, from 2016-2018
  - Bercy Muana, from 2021-2021
- Guitarists of Bassists :
  - Bobo Véron (Mi-Solo, Rythmic), from 1986-1991
  - Yoto Nkelani (Solo, Mi-solo), from 1986-1992 (Deceased)
  - Toussaint Vince (Rythmic, Mi-Solo, Solo), from 1986-1993
  - Fofo Le Collégien (Basse, Rythmic, Mi-Solo), from 1986-1990, Returned from 1999-2006
  - Philo Bass (Basse), from 1987-1992
  - Do Akongo (Rythmic), from 1987-2000
  - Rocky Blanchard Miantezolo (Basse), from 1989-1997, Returned from 1998-2001, 2005-2025
  - Felly Tyson (Solo, Mi-Solo, Rythmic), from 1991-2011
  - Didace Iboula (Mi-Solo, Solo, Rythmic), from 1991-1994
  - Lebou Kabuya (Solo, Mi-Solo, Rythmic), from 1991-1999, Returned from 2003-2005 (Deceased)
  - Augusto Nsingi (Basse), from 1992-1995
  - Beniko Popolipo (Mi-solo, Solo, Rythmic), from 1993-1997, returned from 1998-2000
  - Pathy Bass (Basse), from 1994-1999
  - Binda Bass (Basse), from 1995-2011
  - Ridens Makosso (Rythmic, Mi-Solo, Solo), from 1996-2002
  - Sunda Bass (Basse), from 1996-1998 (Deceased)
  - Jean-Marie Motingia (Basse), from 1997-1998
  - Deba O'Neil (Rythmic), from 1999-2000
  - Clovis Silawuka Bass (Basse), from 1999-2000
  - Janvier Okota (Rythmic, Mi-Solo, Solo), from 1999-2000
  - Djodjo Mambu (Rythmic), from 2000-2017 (Deceased)
  - Ramazani Fulutini (Solo, Mi Solo), from 2000-2004
  - Poupa Mystic (Mi-Solo, Solo, Rythmique), from 2001-2021
  - Bourman Idolo (Rythmic), from 2003-2009
  - Mbetenge Domingo (Solo, Mi-Solo, Rythmique), from 2003-2011
  - Richard Kadima (Basse), from 2004-2015, returned from 2017-2019
  - Champion Vualu (Solo, Mi Solo), from 2006-2015
  - Hono Kapanga (Solo, Mi-Solo), from 2007-2010
  - Xtian Schengen (Rythmic), from 2008-2010
  - Teddy Solo (Solo, Mi-Solo), from 2011-2016
  - Padachy (Rythmic), from 2013-2018
  - Didier Cobetox (Basse), from 2013-2017
  - Patrick Djicain (Basse), from 2016-2020
  - Alvarito Solo (Solo, Mi-Solo), from 2016-2016 (Deceased)
  - Davido Okoka (Solo, Mi-Solo), from 2017-2021
  - Drummers :
  - Baguette Kinze, from 1986-1991
  - Trocadéro Mukusa, from 1988-1990
  - Coco Tchomba, from 1989-1997
  - Kaps Kapangala, from 1991-1995
  - Champion Djikapela Esthétique, from 1996-2001, Returned from 2005-2006
  - Tchétché De Balle, from 1997-2000, Returned from 2002-2010
  - Ilele Kambodje, from 2000-2003
  - Titina Alcapone, from 2001-2007
  - Lita Guelord, from 2009-2019 (Deceased)
  - Percussionnists:
  - Simolo Katondi, from 1986-1992
  - Nseka Kudiféléla Passé-Kossé, from 1988-2014 (Deceased)
  - Lady Mbonda, from 2005-2011
  - Papy Lukila, from 2011-2015
  - Synthétizers :
  - Guy Matopé, from 1986-1992
  - Eric Bamba, from 1992-1995
  - Ondoma Motema, from 1995-2001 (Deceased)
  - Christian Nzenze, from 2000-2001
  - Giresse Synthé, from 2002-2011
  - Theo Bidens, from 2003-2004
  - Brice Malonga, from 2004-2006
  - Valérie Synthé, from 2006-2007
  - Igor Synthé, from 2010-2015
  - Gongi :
  - Willie Raul, from 2002-2015
  - Dancers Boys:
  - Tolin Shitokay, from 1986-1994 (Deceased)
  - Tchétché De Balle, from 1995-1997
  - Tshotsholi Samara, from 1995-1996
  - Boketshu Isala, from 1995-1996
  - Tomalain Massamba, from 1995-1996

• Dancers Girls :

  - Rosette Kamono, from 1989-1995, returned from 1997-1998
  - Mireille Kashama, from 1989-1990
  - Dorothée La Japonaise, from 1990-1992
  - Bichan Pitho, from 1990-1992
  - Fifi Miss Yolo, from 1990-1998
  - Floriane Mangenda, from 1991-1992
  - Jacky Bebeto, from 1991-1994 (Deceased)
  - Marie-Vincent Ekunza, from 1991-1992 (Deceased)
  - Rita Dembo, from 1993-1996, returned from 1999-2000
  - Chantal Mogao, from 1993-1994
  - Zina Bilaho, from 1993-1999, Returned from 1999-2000
  - Mireille Kondé, from 1993-1998 (Deceased)
  - Solange Ekutshu, from 1994-1996, returned from 1998-2001 (Deceased)
  - Mboyo Bondele, from 1994-1995 (Deceased)
  - Nono Ba Diamant, from 1995-1999
  - Miette Shégué, from 1995-1999
  - Waba Clara , from 1995-1996
  - Claudine AC Milan, from 1996-2001
  - Sarah Ba Diamant, from 1996-1998
  - Chimène Badiamant Deux, from 1996-1998
  - Youyou Tchivundu, from 1997-1999
  - Charlie Chocolat, from 1998-1999
  - Francine Bongongo, from 1999-2000 (Deceased)
  - Godé Mujinga, from 1999-1999 (Deceased)
  - Fifi Kimbondonbo, from 1999-1999 (Deceased)
  - Midi Kompressor, from 1999-2002
  - Bibi Sucre, from 1999-2001
  - Nina Vanke, from 1999-2001, returned from 2022-2023
  - Tina De Bandal, from 1999-2001
  - Irène Ba Beauté, from 1999-2000
  - Chouchou Mbayo, from 1999-2002, returned from 2003-2004, 2009-2013, 2016-2017 (Deceased)
  - Blandine Korando, from 1999-2001
  - Patricia Mibaramon, from 1999-2002
  - Spaghetti Vicky, from 1999-2001 (Deceased)
  - Mave Manoka, from 1999-2001
  - Nana Mulenga, from 2000-2000
  - Sandralina Ba Beauté, from 2000-2002
  - El-Bazoul Ba Whisky, from 2000-2001 (Deceased)
  - Clara De Bruxelles, from 2000-2001
  - Patricia Champagne, from 2000-2001
  - Patience Ibembo, from 2000-2005, returned from 2006-2007
  - Clarisse, from 2000-2001
  - Maguy, from 2000-2001
  - Bijoux, from 2000-2001
  - Nadine Kuengita, from 2000-2002
  - Titine Lacrau, from 2000-2001
  - Mbo Nzuzi Ngoy, from 2000-2002
  - Yéti Munieti, from 2000-2001, returned from 2003-2005
  - Monica Céleste, from 2001-2002 (Deceased)
  - Dolores, from 2001-2002
  - Bennie Musika, from 2001-2006
  - Nana Kabena, from 2001-2002
  - Huguette Nzapa, from 2001-2002
  - Bibicia Automatique, from 2002-2003, returned from 2005-2005, 2008-2009
  - Bijoux Anapata, from 2002-2003, returned from 2004-2005
  - Pamela Bengongo, from 2002-2008, returned from 2011-2017
  - Laura Mombili, from 2002-2003, returned from 2006-2007, 2013-2014
  - Cadhy Show, from 2002-2003
  - Françoise Marcation, from 2003-2006
  - Yana Kadogo, from 2003-2005
  - Sandra Bakampa, from 2003-2005
  - Harmonie Tshindo, from 2004-2006
  - Nadège Bafanta, from 2004-2006
  - Kadogo Kotakoli, from 2004-2005
  - Flore Lubaki, from 2004-2006
  - Pamela Nicaragua, from 2004-2005
  - Francine Sourire, from 2005-2007
  - Stella Mbala, from 2005-2006
  - Bobette Ngoy, from 2006-2010
  - Fatou Disosologie, from 2006-2007
  - Micheline États-Unis, from 2006-2007
  - Nancy Dubaï, from 2006-2007
  - Shekinah Musika, from 2006-2011
  - Yolande Litalia, from 2006-2012
  - Flore Elengi, from 2007-2011
  - Blanche Kibala, from 2007-2008
  - Renate Biberon, from 2007-2007, returned from 2022-2024
  - Patricia Apataki, from 2007-2009, returned from 2012-2017
  - Valérie Lito, from 2007-2013
  - Miss Coulibaly, from 2007-2008
  - Falonne, from 2007-2008
  - Céleste Canon, from 2008-2009
  - Mina Gondi, from 2008-2009, returned from 2015-2016
  - Laurette Mbila, from 2008-2017, returned from 2022-2024
  - Jeannine Osonga, from 2008-2009, returned from 2012-2013
  - Jolie Kindu, from 2008-2009
  - Judith Songa, from 2008-2012 (Deceased)
  - Laeticia Leader, from 2008-2011
  - Patricia, from 2008-2012
  - Stéphanie Nguya, from 2008-2012
  - Blandine Bilengi, from 2009-2011
  - Cuisse De Poulet, from 2009-2011
  - Fatou Le Cœur, from 2009-2013
  - Joyce Bebeta, from 2009-2011
  - Judith Tabu, from 2009-2011
  - Nadine Pepeka, from 2009-2011
  - Fivette Mayamba, from 2010-2017
  - Nancy Muzitu, from 2010-2016
  - Nina Vangu, from 2011-2015, returned from 2018-2020
  - Julie Mulanga, from 2011-2012
  - Jenny Mutuale, from 2012-2014
  - Sofia Napopo, from 2012-2024
  - Charlène Bolia, from 2013-2013
  - Gina, from 2013-2013
  - Lilas Métro, from 2013-2017
  - Miss Vodacom, from 2013-2014
  - Sarah Yenga, from 2014-2023
  - Falonne Sifa, from 2014-2017, returned from 2019-2022
  - Benedicte, from 2017-2021
  - Gloria, from 2017-2024
  - Ida Bafanta, from 2017-2022
  - Judith Kusa, from 2018-2024
  - Rachel Muya, from 2018-2023
  - Vicky, from 2018-2022
  - Carmen Ngalula, from 2018-2021
  - Mermez Mbombo, from 2019-2023
  - Divine, from 2020-2024
  - Facebook, from 2020-2023
