= Ferré Gola =

Congolose singer (born 1976)

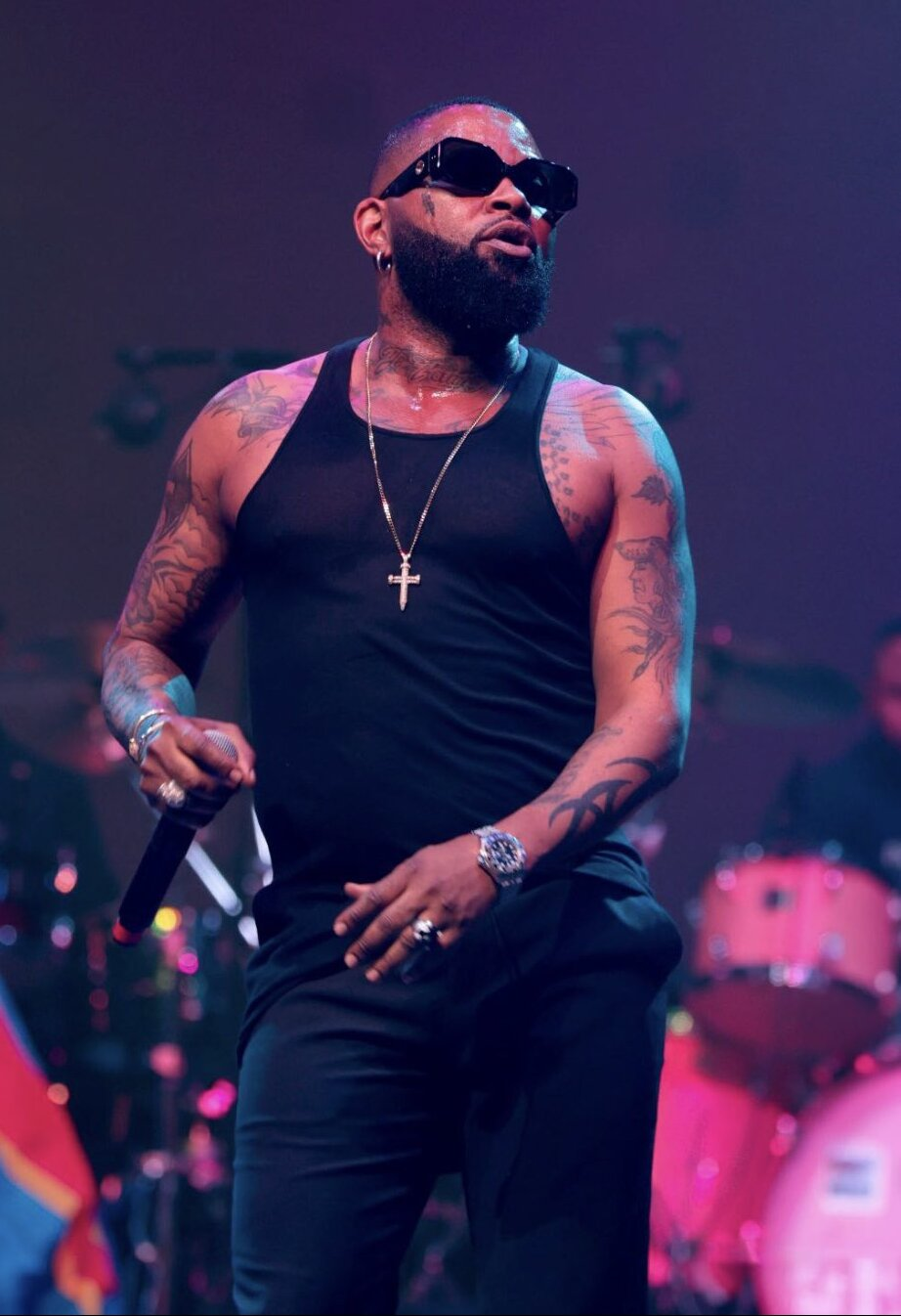
- Ferré Gola in 2024

Background information
- Also known as: Jésus de Nuances; Chair De Poule; Le Padre
- Born: Hervé Gola Bataringe; 3 March 1976 (age 50); Kinshasa, Zaire (modern-day Democratic Republic of the Congo)
- Genres: Congolese rumba; ndombolo
- Occupations: Singer; songwriter; dancer; record producer
- Instrument: Vocals
- Years active: 1994–present
- Labels: Obouo Music; DRTV Production; Kiki Productions; SMEA
- Formerly of: Rumba des Jeunes; Wenge Musica; Wenge Musica Maison Mère; Les Marquis de Maison Mère; Quartier Latin International

Hervé Gola Bataringe (born 3 March 1976), known professionally as Ferré Gola, is a Congolese singer-songwriter, dancer, and record producer. Revered as "Jesus de Nuances", he is known for his tenor voice and is considered a central figure in the evolution of fifth-generation Congolese rumba. His lyrics predominantly revolve around themes of love, social support, and interpersonal relationships.

Bataringe began his music career as a member of the Kinshasa-based band Rumba des Jeunes. In 1994, he was spotted and recruited by Werrason into the soukous band Wenge Musica. Following the group's dissolution in December 1997, Bataringe followed Werrason to the offshoot group, Wenge Musica Maison Mère. He gained recognition with his smash hit "Vita-Imana", which appeared on Wenge Musica Maison Mère's 1999 album, Solola Bien! In 2004, Bataringe co-founded the band Les Marquis de Maison Mère alongside Bill Clinton Kalonji and JDT Mulopwe. Their double album, Miracles, garnered continental acclaim, and they received a nomination at the Kora Awards.

In 2005, Bataringe joined Koffi Olomidé's Quartier Latin International, before venturing into a solo career in 2006, with his debut studio album, Sens Interdit. In 2009, he released his second album, Qui est derrière toi?, which gained widespread popularity across Africa and earned a gold record from SACEM, selling over 110,000 copies. In December 2011, he issued a three-track maxi-single titled "Avant-goût", which earned him a nomination for Best Male Artist of Central Africa at the 2012 Kora Awards. Bataringe's third studio album, Boite Noire, released in July 2013, sold 10,000 copies in five hours in Paris. In 2014, he released a five-track maxi-single titled "Dérangement", which earned him a nomination for Best Rumba Artist at the 2015 Afroca Music Awards. In July 2015, Bataringe won the Best Male Video at the Bilily Awards and was nominated for Best Central African Male Artist at the African Muzik Magazine Awards.

In June 2017, Bataringe released his fourth studio album, QQJD, after having won the Best African Artist award at the Canal 2'Or on 4 March 2017. In March 2022, he released his fifth studio album, Dynastie Volume 1, which amassed over one million streams on Spotify within 21 days of its debut. Dynastie Volume 1 also won Best African Melody Album from Sony Music Entertainment Africa. In October 2023, he released his sixth studio album, Dynastie 2 Volume 1. In October 2023, he issued Dynastie 2 Volume 2. In July 2025, Bataringe was ranked third on Billboard France's chart of the most-streamed Congolese artists, limited to those who began their careers in either the DRC or the Republic of the Congo.

== Early life and career ==
=== 1976–1996: Early life, education, and Wenge Musica ===
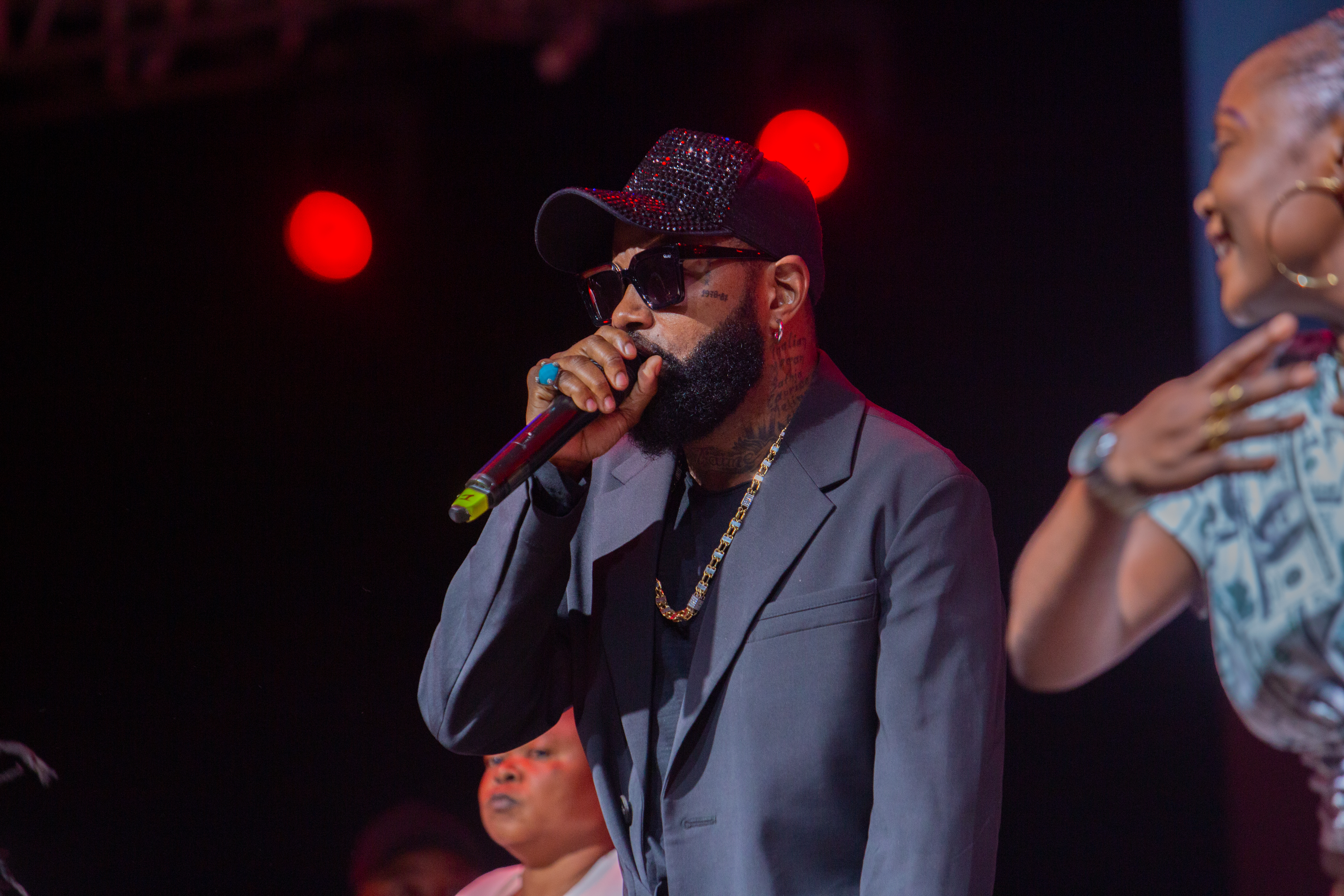
Ferré Gola performing the closing act of the 15th edition of the Anoumabo Urban Music Festival in 2023

Ferré Gola was born Hervé Gola Bataringe on 3 March 1976, in the Kintambo commune of Kinshasa, in what was then Zaire (now the Democratic Republic of the Congo). He spent his formative years in the Ngiri-Ngiri commune, raised by his mother alongside his siblings. He is the seventh of nine children, born to mixed Teke and Yombe parentage. From a young age, Bataringe harbored dreams of becoming a professional musician, drawing inspiration from Franco Luambo, TPOK Jazz, Carlyto Lassa, Tabu Ley Rochereau, Simaro Lutumba, King Kester Emeneya, Papa Wemba, Youssou N'Dour, and Salif Keita. He actively participated in local musicians' rehearsals after school and started writing songs. The family later relocated to the Bandalungwa commune, where Bataringe joined the band Rumba des Jeunes and began honing his skills in Congolese rumba.

In 1994, during a talent fair in Bandalungwa, he was spotted and recruited by Werrason into the soukous band Wenge Musica. In 1996, Bataringe was henceforth named Ferré by Adolphe Dominguez, in reference to the Italian fashion designer Gianfranco Ferré, which contributed to his stage name, "Ferré Gola".

=== 1997–2003: Wenge Musica Maison Mère ===
Following Wenge Musica's disbandment in 1997, Ferré Gola joined the newly formed splinter group Wenge Musica Maison Mère (WMMM), established by Werrason, Didier Masela, and Adolphe Dominguez. Ferré Gola gained prominence in 1999 after the release of his single "Vita-Imana", from WMMM's album Solola Bien! The track was awarded Best Song of the Year by the Association des Chroniqueurs de Musique du Congo and saw great success in the Democratic Republic of the Congo, Republic of the Congo, and Kenya.

In 2001, Ferré Gola became WMMM's director after the departure of Christian Mabanga and founder Didier Masela, and he took on a larger role after Adolphe Dominguez left. In 2002, WMMM released their third studio album, A la Queue Leu-Leu.

=== 2004–2005: Les Marquis de Maison Mère and Quartier Latin International ===
In 2004, WMMM toured Europe, but disputes materialized during their stay in the UK. Following these occurrences, Ferré Gola co-founded Les Marquis de Maison Mère with Bill Clinton Kalonji and JDT Mulopwe. The band released their debut, 18-track double album, Miracles, which included Ferré Gola's hits "100 Kilos", "Amour Intérêt", and "Papitcho Nyanx". Miracles received widespread acclaim and further catapulted Ferré Gola into the spotlight.

However, upon their return to Kinshasa from Paris in early 2005, Ferré Gola and Bill Clinton had unresolved conflicts. In Paris, Ferré Gola found himself largely sidelined by JDT Mulopwe, who was preoccupied with fulfilling his commitments to Les Marquis de Maison Mère. Meanwhile, Bill Clinton had already started rehearsing with his newly formed band, Samurai, at Le Record nightclub in Lingwala, having invested in new musical equipment. The rift between Ferré Gola and Bill Clinton deepened after an unsuccessful meeting, and a public fallout ensued when attempts to mend their differences failed. With no contract and lacking instruments, Ferré Gola was left in a tough spot. However, he received support from fans, who provided him with musical gear, which he intended to bring back to Kinshasa for his own band, Les Marquis des Bons Garçons, which would later become known as Jet Set. Despite this new direction, Ferré Gola declined Joël Photo Mbetenge's proposal to return to Wenge Musica Maison Mère and remained committed to his own band.

He later joined Koffi Olomidé's Quartier Latin International as a singer and composer and contributed significantly to Olomide's maxi-single "Boma Nga N'Elengi" and solo studio album Danger de mort, notably on tracks such as "Sisi Silvie" and "Insecticide".

== Solo career ==
=== 2006–2012: Sens Interdit, Qui est derrière toi?, Zénith de Paris, and Avant-goût ===
In 2006, Ferré Gola released his debut solo studio album, Sens Interdit, under the name "Ferré-Gola Chair De Poule". Consisting of 12 tracks, Sens Interdit was produced under DRTV Production, with Ferré Gola as a producer alongside Norbert Dabira. The album was recorded at Studio Recorder and featured backing vocalists Bivarai, Cele Zino, and Mirage Supersonic, as well as Michel Bass and Lumana Masewu on bass and Japonais Maladi on lead guitar. Ferré Gola subsequently secured a sponsorship deal with the DRC's Bralima Primus beer brand. Sens Interdit's success helped expand Ferré Gola's fanbase across Africa, leading to performances in France, Belgium, and various Schengen Area states alongside Jet Set in January 2008. After his return to Kinshasa, he released a two-track compact disc containing the ndombolo-infused theme song "Lubukulukumu" for Primus and a remixed version of "Vita Imana" to promote Jet Set. In March 2008, he performed at the Élysée Montmartre in Paris. In August 2008, he hosted a sold-out concert in Cabinda Province, Angola, and he made a guest appearance on Nsimba Lufwankenda's studio album Contre Mur later that year.

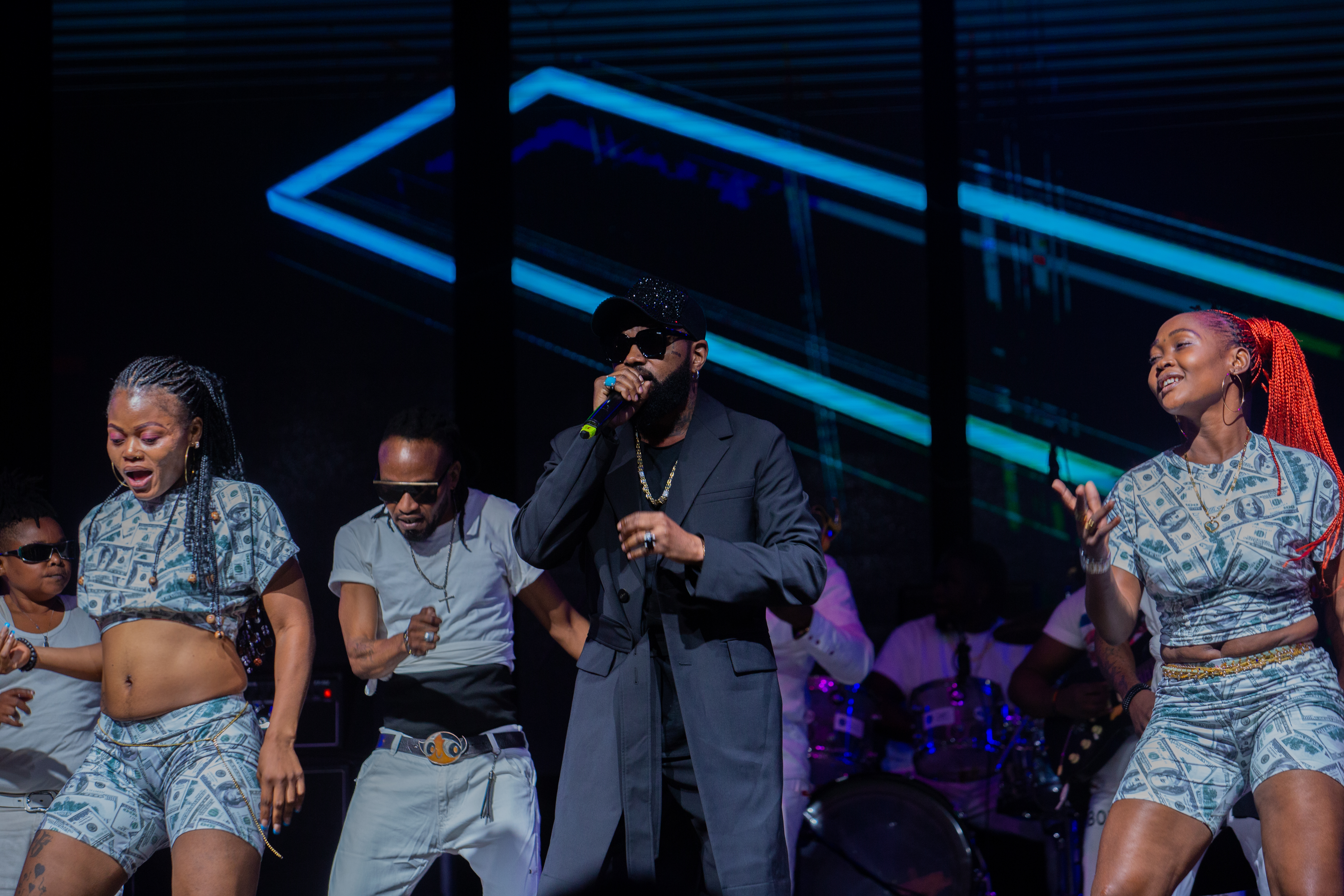
Ferré Gola in 2023

In May 2009, during an interview with Radio Okapi, Ferré Gola announced that his forthcoming 18-track double album, Qui est derrière toi?, was nearly complete. He then embarked on an American tour. Qui est derrière toi? was released in October 2009 to Paris and Kinshasa markets under DRTV Production and Kiki Productions, with Norbert Dabira as executive producer. It featured backing vocals by Bivaray, Cele Zino, and Fila Jems, and instrumental work by Giscard Bass and Michel Bass on bass guitar, Djoudjou Ché on drums, and guitar work by Marc House and Olivier Tshimanga. The album was a fusion of Congolese rumba, R&B, and ndombolo, and it received wide acclaim across Africa and across the continent's diaspora in France. On 12 September 2011, it won Ferré Gola three awards at the Trophées des Arts Afro Caribéens, including Best Singer in Africa, Best Male Voice in Central Africa, and Best Video, for "Zazou". In October of that year, Qui est derrière toi? received gold certification from SACEM after selling over 110,000 copies across Africa, America, and Europe. In November–December of that year, Ferré Gola participated in the cultural programming of the Wallonie-Bruxelles Center in Kinshasa, alongside Lexxus Legal, Mantuila, and Félix Manuaku Waku.

In May 2010, he took the stage at the Zénith de Paris with Jet Set after having sold 4,500 tickets, accompanied by music columnists Tshitenge from Radio Télévision Groupe Avenir and Hélène Kalemba from Raga TV.

In December 2011, Ferré Gola issued the maxi-single titled "Avant-goût", containing three tracks: "Tchekele Pete", "Porte-Monnaie", and "Leke Leke". On 30 December 2012, he was nominated for Best Central African Male Artist for his song "Tchekele Pete" at the Kora Awards.

=== 2013–2015: Boite noire, collaborative ventures, Battle Afro, and Dérangement ===
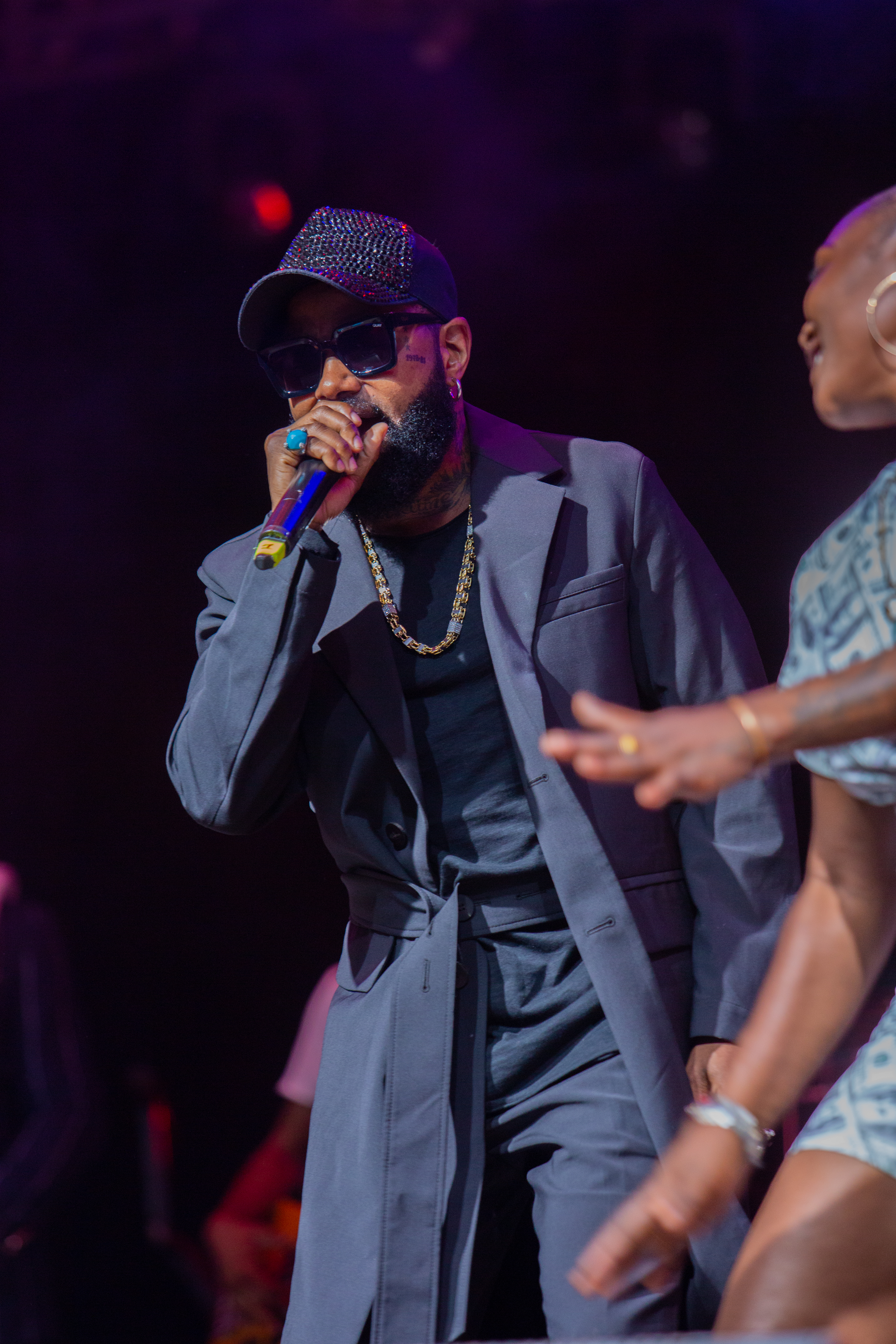
Gola performing in Abidjan in 2023

In February 2011, during an interview with host Marc Tabu in Paris, aired on TVS 1 in Kinshasa, Gola revealed that his forthcoming double album, Boite noire, was in the conclusive phases of production. The record was initially slated for release in 2012, but this was postponed to July 2013. Distributed across two volumes with a total of 22 tracks and produced by Diego Music, Boite noire blended Congolese rumba, kuduro, and ndombolo. It sold 10,000 copies in five hours in Paris. Three days later, it debuted in first and second place on the iTunes bestsellers in the World Music category in France, Canada, and Belgium. It also reached the ninth and twelfth spots in South Africa. The single "Pakadjuma" peaked at number five on Trace Africa's Top 10 chart, while "Chichiwash" secured the third spot on the Top 30 chart. Boite noire's success augmented Ferré Gola's visibility, leading to invitations for collaborations on the compilation Les chroniques du Wati Boss, featuring the French rapper Dry on the track "J'ai tout donné". He also collaborated with Black Bazar and Izé Teixeira on the song "Songa Flesh", which was produced by Alain Mabanckou.

In October 2013, Ferré Gola served as a member of the jury for Battle Afro, alongside artists like Alicia Fall, Phil Darwin, Mokobé, Lino Versace, and Serge Beynaud.

On 13 February 2014, Ferré Gola was a featured guest at the seventh edition of the Anoumabo Urban Music Festival in Abidjan, Ivory Coast, hosted by Magic System at UNESCO Headquarters in Paris, and he subsequently earned two nominations for Best Central African Artist at Kundé d'Or and Best Francophone Artist at the 2014 MTV Africa Music Awards. In June 2014, he performed at the Bralima-sponsored Primus Fete de la Musique at the Théâtre de Verdure in Mont Ngaliema. He was later nominated for Best Male Central Africa at the African Muzik Magazine Awards. In September 2014, Ferré Gola participated in the Francofolies festival in Kinshasa, sharing the spotlight with Lokua Kanza, Youssoupha, Fally Ipupa, Werrason, Lexxus Legal, La Fouine, Johnny Clegg, and Passi.

Recorded simultaneously with Boite noire since mid-2013, Ferré Gola released a five-track maxi-single titled Dérangement at the end of 2014, featuring the song "Vieux Jaloux". In May 2015, he was nominated for Best Rumba Artist at the Afroca Music Awards in Brazzaville. In June 2015, he issued the ndombolo-infused single "Seben" on the Kinshasa market, which was met with great success. On 11 July 2015, Ferré Gola won the Best Male Video at the Bilily Awards in Kinshasa and was subsequently nominated for Best Central African Male Artist at the African Muzik Magazine Awards. He also made a cameo appearance on French rapper Gradur's mixtape ShegueyVara 2, on the track "Motema". Ferré Gola took the stage on 27 November 2015 at the Kenyatta International Convention Centre in Nairobi, followed by a performance in Kisumu at Club Buccaneers, alongside Dola Kabarry and Prezda Bandasson, on 5 December. Later in December, Ferré Gola received a nomination for Best Male Artist of Central Africa at the Kora Awards.

=== 2016–2018: QQJD ===
In March 2015, Ferré Gola announced his forthcoming double album, Qu'est ce que j'avais dit, also known as QQJD. He teamed up with Kenyan singer Victoria Kimani on the single "Tucheze" and later made a guest appearance on J. Martins' album Authentic, on the track "Ekelebe". On 30 September 2016, he dropped the single "ManiX", declaring its inclusion on QQJD, and on 18 December, he issued the ndombolo-infused dance track "Boss". The Congolese rumba-infused "Jugement" premiered on his birthday, on 3 March 2017, and garnered immense success, debuting at the top of the Congolese charts and amassing over a million views on YouTube within three weeks. While engrossed in album production, Ferré Gola won Best African Artist on 4 March 2017 at the eleventh edition of Canal 2'Or, hosted by the Cameroonian television channel Canal 2 International at the Palais des Congrès in Yaoundé. The event was attended by the First Lady of Cameroon, Chantal Biya, and Ferré Gola was subsequently honored by the DRC's Minister of Culture and Arts, Sylvain Maurice Masheke. In April 2017, to celebrate his decade-long music career and to promote QQJD, Ferré Gola performed in Lagos alongside J. Martins.

QQJD made its official debut on 9 June 2017. It comprises 33 tracks, distributed across three compact discs (Red, Blue, and Gold), which symbolize the Congolese flag's colors, with each disc containing eleven tracks. QQJD blended Congolese rumba and ndombolo. The three volumes peaked at no. 1, 2, and 3 in the iTunes world music category on their release day. To further promote QQJD, Gola embarked on several concerts in Kenya, Angola, and the Central African Republic. On 30 June 2017, he performed in Moscow, Russia, and later received a nomination for Best Central African Artist at the All Africa Music Awards, on 22 July. On 28 July, he headlined the Soirée QQJD event in Brussels, before returning to Kinshasa to perform at Espace Amaryllis in the Ngaliema commune and receiving a nomination at the HAPA Music Awards. Ferré Gola concluded his tour with performances in Abidjan and Kisangani, followed by a show in Hawaii on 1 January 2018.

=== 2019–2022: COVID-19 response, Casino de Paris concert, and Dynastie Volume 1 ===
During the COVID-19 pandemic, Ferré Gola premiered an acoustic live set titled Home Acoustique on 5 May 2020 from his home, to urge people to stay indoors. The performance garnered widespread acclaim, inspiring fellow Congolese artists to emulate the concept. He subsequently participated in a virtual concert, "Africa Together", organized by the International Red Cross and Red Crescent Movement in partnership with Facebook, to counter COVID-19 misinformation and advocate sustained vigilance against the virus.

Ferré Gola was slated to perform at the Casino de Paris on 7 November 2021, but the concert was canceled one month before the rescheduled date without explanation.

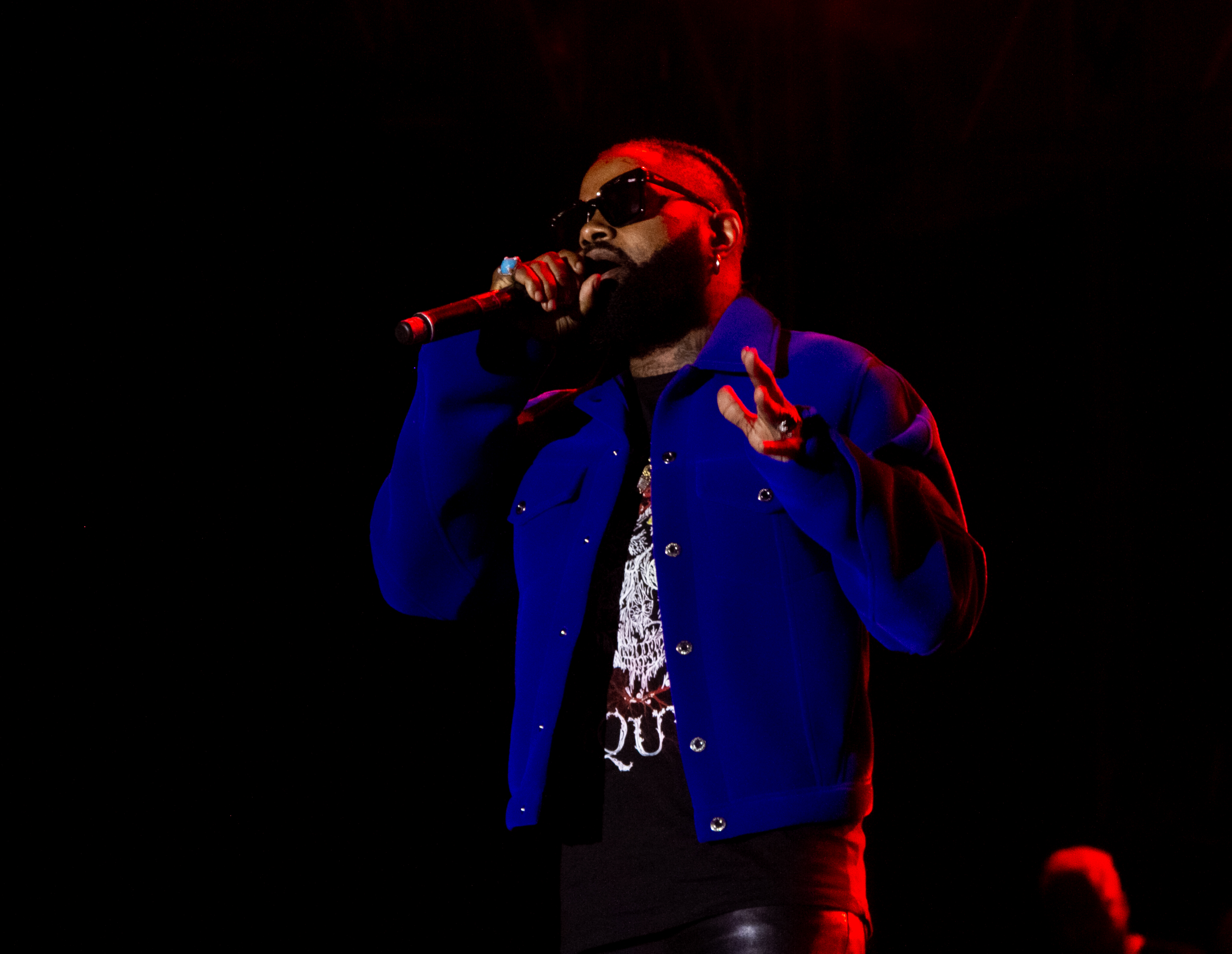
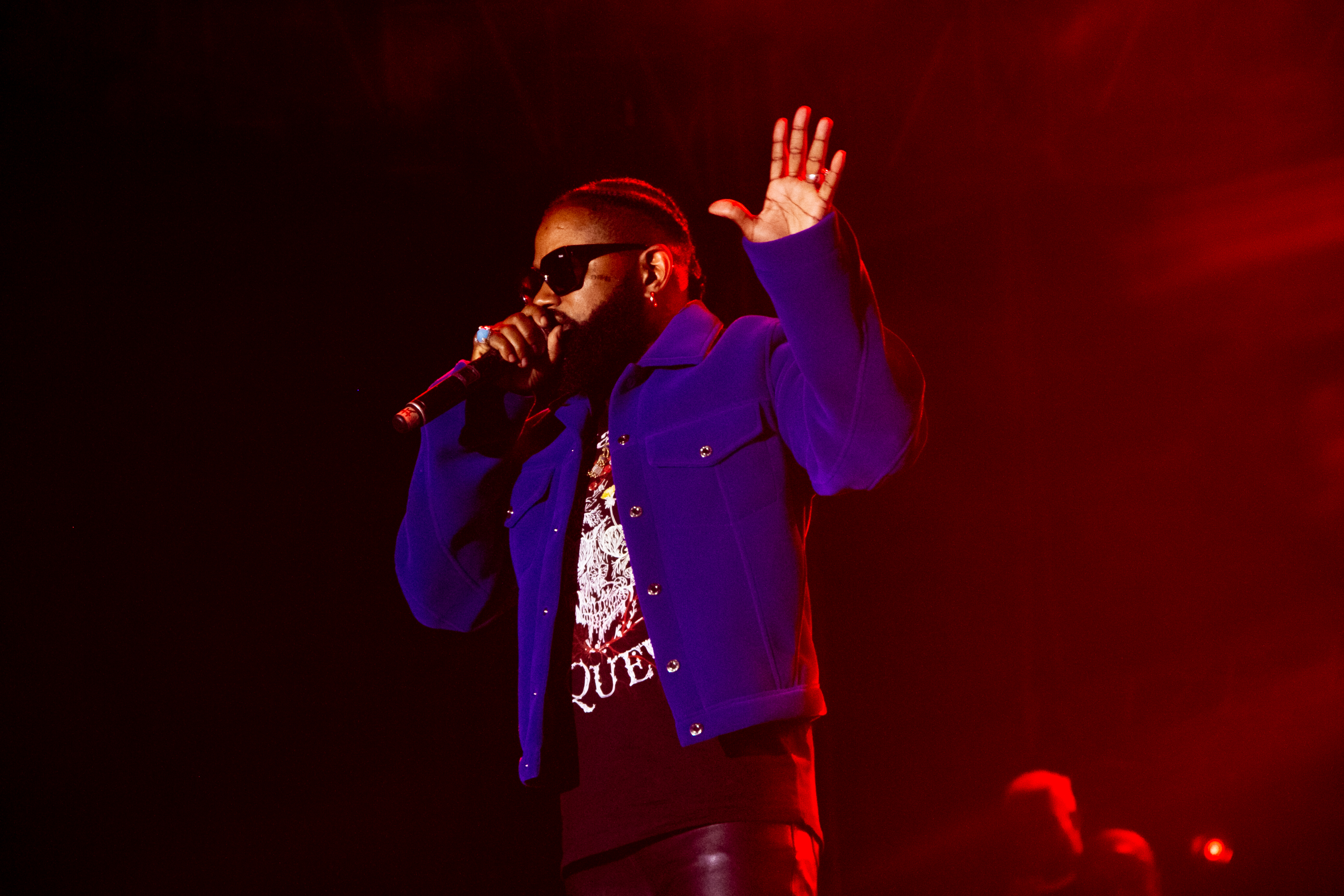
Ferré Gola performing at the Anoumabo Urban Music Festival in 2023

In January 2021, Ferré Gola announced his upcoming double album, Dynastie Volume 1, which he said would feature his former bandmates from Wenge Musica Maison Mère as well as several collaborations with Jet Set musicians. On 22 February, he performed at the Palais de la Culture in Abidjan. In March, he went to Guadeloupe to film music videos for the album. On 11 March 2022, he released the single "Rumba Trap", which blended Congolese rumba and trap music. On 17 March, Ferré Gola signed a record deal with Sony Music Africa, for the release of Dynastie Volume 1, which debuted on 25 March, across various platforms including Spotify, Deezer, iTunes, and YouTube. It includes 17 songs plus a bonus track, with different music styles ranging from Congolese rumba, trap, salsa, ndombolo, R&B, and hip-hop. The album features guest appearances by Josey, Innoss'B, and Chily. The songs explore themes of love, disappointment, and social life. Within 21 days of its debut, Dynastie Volume 1 amassed over one million streams on Spotify and peaked at number one in the Best Sellers category on the French Amazon Music.

Following the album's launch, Ferré Gola performed in Nigeria and Guinea to boost its promotion. However, his tour concluded in early June due to legal issues in Paris concerning his family. Ferré Gola spent two months in prison and was released in August 2022. In gratitude to his fandom, he released a song titled "Liberté", which garnered one million views on YouTube within three weeks. After a brief stint in Paris, Ferré Gola hosted a VIP concert at the Sofitel Hôtel Ivoire in Ivory Coast, before returning to Kinshasa on 10 November. He then performed at Kin Plaza Arjaan in Kinshasa, where he was joined onstage by KeBlack and Chily. Towards the end of November, Dynastie Volume 1 clinched the accolade for Best African Melody Album from Sony Music Entertainment Africa.

=== 2023–2024: Dynastie 2 Volume 1, Dynastie 2 Volume 2 ===
During an interview with musical pundits of Elengi Ya CongoTV on 30 November 2022, Ferré Gola revealed that the first volume of his sixth studio album, Dynastie 2, was almost finished and would include collaborations with South African amapiano artists and former Wenge Musica Maison Mère bandmates. To boost the album's promotion, Ferré Gola launched the single "Bizorbi" on 20 January 2023, which amassed one million views in six days. "Bizorbi" gained more widespread acclaim following his concert at Salle Elmas in Évreux, France, on 11 February, where he delivered a distinctive rendition of the song, triggering a trend on social media known as the "#Bizorbichallenge" on TikTok, Instagram, and YouTube, which was embraced by celebrities such as Cameroonian singer Blanche Bailly, Nigerian actress Ruth Kadiri, Nigerian singer Iyanya, and others. On 7 June, he organized an American tour with Jet Set for two concerts, scheduled for 10–11 June at Lincoln Square Mall in Urbana, Illinois.

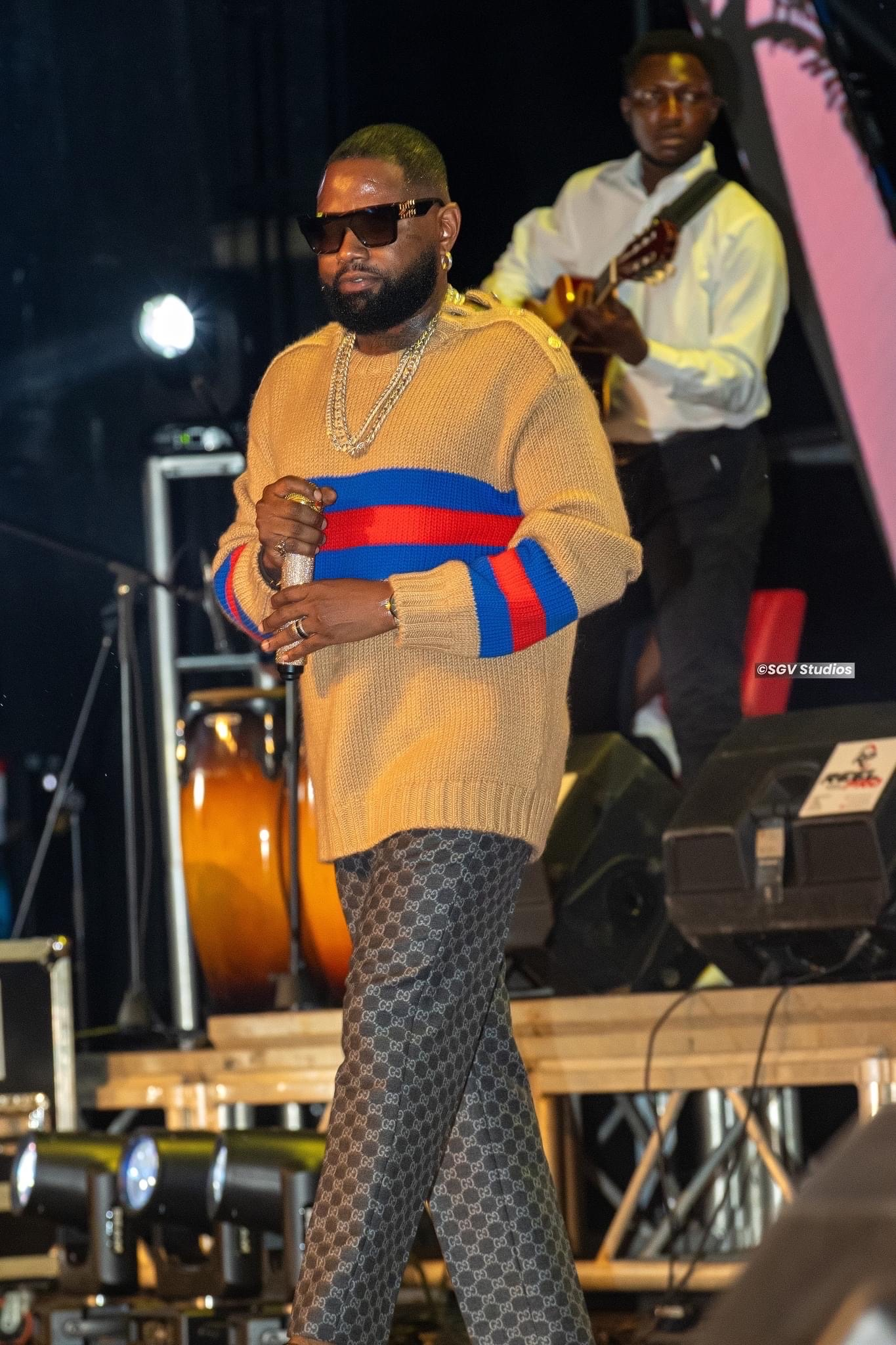
Ferré Gola performing at the Culture Palace of Abidjan on 25 November 2023, during his international tour promoting Dynastie

On 24 June, Ferré Gola held a sold-out performance at the Stade des Martyrs, attracting a crowd of over 100,000 to a venue with an 80,000-person capacity. Ivorian singer Willy Dumbo introduced him onstage, where Ferré Gola was joined by Kenyan singer Victoria Kimani. Werrason ranked the concert in the top three of the best performances ever held at the stadium. Congolese-French singer Gims extolled him as "the man of the stadiums". The Congolese digital news outlet Mbote.cd named the concert the "Show of the Year".

On 6 August, he performed a quick playback at the closing ceremony of the 2023 Jeux de la Francophonie, offering an a cappella tribute to the victims of the ongoing Kivu conflicts in the eastern part of the Democratic Republic of the Congo. Later that evening, he took the stage at the Esplanade Du Palais Du Peuple in Kinshasa for the penultimate day of the Nuits de la Francophonie event.

The first volume of Dynastie 2 was released on 13 October, comprising 20 tracks and characterized by a blend of Congolese rumba, ndombolo, and soukous. It featured guest appearances by Soleil Wanga, Modogo, Serge Mabiala, Malage de Lugendo, Pikass Mbayambo, Baby Ndombe, and Miel De Son. Shortly after its debut, it achieved commercial success, peaking at the top of sales on major Congolese platforms such as iTunes, Spotify, and Deezer, as well as reaching number one on African Amazon Music charts. It also peaked at number one on the French iTunes charts. A week later, Dynastie 2 Volume 1 reached 177th position on the Belgian top 200 best-selling albums and 72nd on England's top 100 most downloaded albums on digital platforms.

While promoting Dynastie 2 Volume 1 on 16 October, Ferré Gola announced the impending release of the second volume. Initially slated for release on 27 October, Dynastie 2 Volume 2 came out on 26 October, comprising 20 previously unreleased tracks. It includes guest appearances by JDT Mulopwe, Celeo Scram, Aimélia Lias, Papy Kakol, Deplick Pomba, Michel Basse, Charlie Solo, Thierry Finite, Buffalo, Eboa Lotin, Ali Mbonda, and Cappucino. Within 48 hours of its debut, the album reached number ten on the French iTunes charts. To bolster its promotion, Ferré Gola announced an American tour, which kicked off on 4 November in Dallas, Texas, and wrapped up on 24 March 2024 in Champaign, Illinois, and included performances in Washington, D.C., Cincinnati, Los Angeles, Chicago, and Charlotte, among others.

=== 2024–present: performances and standalone releases ===
On 20–21 April 2024, Ferré Gola performed two sold-out concerts with Jet Set at the Adidas Arena in Paris. He was joined onstage by several guests, including Tiesco Le Sultan, Singuila, Barbara Pravi, Koffi Olomidé, Hiro, and Chily. He thus became the second artist overall to perform there and the first African musician to do so. On 15 June, he held another sold-out performance, at Geneva Arena in Switzerland. On 23–24 June, he staged two consecutive concerts in Bukavu, starting with the VIP charity event "Dîner de bienfaisance" at Hôtel Résidence, aimed at raising funds for humanitarian projects in the eastern DRC. The second, titled "Le Padre", took place at Collège Alfajiri during the Renaissance Festival. Later that month, he took the stage at Brussels's Couleur Café festival, which ran from 28 to 30 June at Osseghem Park. On 17 November, he performed at the tenth edition of the Amani Festival in Goma.

Ferré Gola teased fans with a short snippet of his upcoming ndombolo-inspired single "Mobondo", featuring Tanzanian singer Rayvanny, at the end of October 2024 . On 6 November, both artists shared another preview on their social platforms, fueling excitement for the song, which went viral on TikTok before its official release on 20 December, with users enthusiastically replicating its accompanying dance and challenging others to join. Ferré Gola and Rayvanny supported "Mobondo" with a live performance during the opening of the 46th Foire Internationale du Congo-Kinshasa, on 21 December. On 1 May 2025, Ferré Gola released "Amour illusoire", a French-language single that features his vocals paired with piano and a traditional rumba beat. The accompanying music video amassed over four million views within a month, including over one million in India, a country with limited exposure to Congolese rumba. It peaked in second place on the DRC's YouTube Weekly Chart, just behind Fally Ipupa's "Le Temps".

On 7 June, Ferré Gola and Jet Set performed at the ING Arena in Brussels, where "Amour Illusoire" captivated the audience, with fans singing along passionately. Ferré Gola was accompanied onstage by Soleil Wanga, JDT Mulopwe, Chily, and Deplick Pomba. During the event, Ferré Gola offered a brief preview of his forthcoming album Harmonie, which fuses traditional Congolese rumba with contemporary urban styles such as trap. The performance received significant acclaim from the public and cultural critics, with writer Alain Mabanckou hailing Ferré Gola as the "eternal Angel of rumba", while Walim M. from Trends.cd described it as a "masterful performance". By 22 July, Ferré Gola had secured the third position on Billboard France's ranking of the top-streamed Congolese artists since the start of the year, among those whose careers began in the DRC or the Republic of the Congo. On 4 April 2026, he performed at the Palais Omnisports de Paris-Bercy with guest artists Rayvanny, Nelsy, and Celeo Scram. The next month, on 22 May, Ferré Gola released the ndombolo single "C'est l'amour", which reached number eight on Radio France Internationale's Afro-Club top ten most-streamed songs.

== Other ventures ==
On 15 April 2024, Ferré Gola opened his first boutique, in Paris, marking the beginning of his international retail venture, Ferré Store. The following month, he introduced a new product line, Eau de Golois, a fragrance developed in France, which became the first perfume sold by Ferré Store. Ferré Gola expressed his intention to provide his fans with a means of enjoying his essence daily, stating that he "wanted to give those who love me the means to smell good every day". In June, a second Ferré Store opened, in Geneva, located in the Galerie Tonon on Boulevard du Théâtre. Building on the success of the Paris and Geneva locations, Ferré Gola opened a third store, in Kinshasa, set up by IllicoCash in collaboration with the artist. In June 2025, Ferré Gola expanded his retail network with the launch of a Ferré Store in Brussels, coinciding with the introduction of his new La Goloise beer. Later that year, in December, he became a brand ambassador for the online gambling company 1xBet.

== Discography ==
=== Solo ===
- Sens Interdit (2006)
- Qui Est Derrière Toi (2009)
- Avant Goût (EP, 2011)
- Boîte Noire (2013)
- Dérangement (EP, 2014)
- QQJD (2017)
- Dynastie Volume 1 (2022)
- Dynastie 2 Volume 1 (2023)
- Dynastie 2 Volume 2 (2023)

=== with Wenge Musica Maison Mère ===
- Force D'Intervention Rapide (1998)
- Solola Bien (1999)
- Terrain Eza Miné (2000)
- Kibuisa Mpimpa (2001)
- À La Queue Leu-Leu (2002)
- Tindika Lokito (2003)

=== with Les Marquis ===
- Miracles (2004)

=== with Quartier Latin ===
- Boma Nga N'Elengi (2005)
- Danger de Mort (2006)

== Awards and nominations ==
Year	Event	Prize	Recipient	Result	Ref.
2001	Association des Chroniqueurs de Musique du Congo	Best Singer	Himself	Won	
2008	Kundé	Best Artist in Central Africa	Himself	Nominated	
2011	Trophées des Arts Afro Caribéens	Best Singer in Africa	Himself	Won	
2011	Trophées des Arts Afro Caribéens	Best Male Voice in Central Africa	Himself	Won	
2011	Trophées des Arts Afro Caribéens	Best Video	"Zazou"	Won	
2012	Kundé	Best Artist in Central Africa	Himself	Nominated	
2012	Kora Awards	Best Male Artist of Central Africa	Himself	Nominated	
2014	Kundé	Best Artist of Central Africa	Himself	Nominated	
2014	MTV Africa Music Awards	Best Francophone	Himself	Nominated	
2014	AFRIMMA	Best Male Artist of Central Africa	Himself	Nominated	
2016	WAMVA	Best Central African Video	"Tucheze" (Victoria Kimani)	Won	
2017	Canal 2'Or	Best African Artist	Himself	Won	
2017	AFRIMMA	Best Male Artiste in Central Africa	Himself	Nominated	
2019	Pool Malebo Music Awards	Best Singer	Himself	Won	
2023	Jayli Awards	Best Artist of Central Africa	Himself	Nominated	
2023	Prix Lokumu	Best Rumba Song of the Year	"Carte Rose"	Won	
2023	Afroca Music Awards	Best Rumba Artist	Himself	Won	
2024	Kundé	Best Artist of Central Africa	Himself	Won	
2024	Mundi Music Awards	Best Live Performance	Himself	Nominated	
2024	Mundi Music Awards	Best Choreographer Artist	"Bizorbi"	Won	
2024	Mundi Music Awards	Best Lyrics	"Second Chance"	Nominated	
2024	Victoires de la musique guinéenne (VDMG Awards)	Best Artist of Central Africa	Himself	Won	
2026	AFRIMA	Best Artist, Duo or Group in African Contemporary	With Rayvanny	Nominated	
2026	AFRIMA	Songwriter of the Year	"Amour Illusoire"	Nominated	
