= Jipson Butukondolo =

Congolese musician

Jean-Pierre Butukondolo Vakalamfumu, known professionally as Jipson Butukondolo, is a composer, vocalist, and entertainer in the band Quartier Latin International. The band is from the Democratic Republic of the Congo and was founded and is led by Congolese musician Koffi Olomide.

== Early life and career ==
Jipson Butukondolo was born Jean-Pierre Butukondolo Vakalamfumu in Matadi, in the Kongo Central province of the Democratic Republic of the Congo. While growing up there, he was especially drawn to the music of Koffi Olomide and Tabu Ley Rochereau. Because joining Tabu Ley's Orchestre Afrisa International proved difficult, he turned his attention to Koffi's band, Quartier Latin International. His musical career began around 1990, when he performed with small local bands in Matadi. In 1997, he officially became a member of Quartier Latin International. In an interview with the French-language Congolese newspaper Le Phare, he credited fellow singer Bouro Mpela with helping him settle into the band.

For the band's fifth studio album, Force De Frappe, released on 26 December 2000, Butukondolo composed his debut song, "Moprete Lendila", and participated vocally on nearly every track, either as a lead or backing singer. He later admitted to Le Phare that adjusting to Quartier Latin's tcha tcho style was challenging for him. Force De Frappe quickly rose to the top of major radio and television charts and led to tours across France, United States, West Africa, Nairobi, and Mombasa.

On 28 March 2003, the band released their sixth album, Affaire d'État, which included Butukondolo's song "Biblia". This track brought him widespread recognition, with Le Phare noting that he became a media favorite and highly valued by Koffi. He explained that the song was "carefully developed", with significant help from his friend Didier Kadi. Titled "Bible", the song encourages forgiveness of those who cause harm and reflects on human ingratitude. The band's seventh studio album, Danger de Mort, released on 13 October 2006, became Quartier Latin's final album, following the departure of several members. On Danger de Mort, Butukondolo wrote the song "Ba Lobiens".

== See also ==
- Fally Ipupa
- Bouro Mpela
- List of Democratic Republic of the Congo musicians
