= Cindy Le Coeur =

Congolese musician (born 1983)

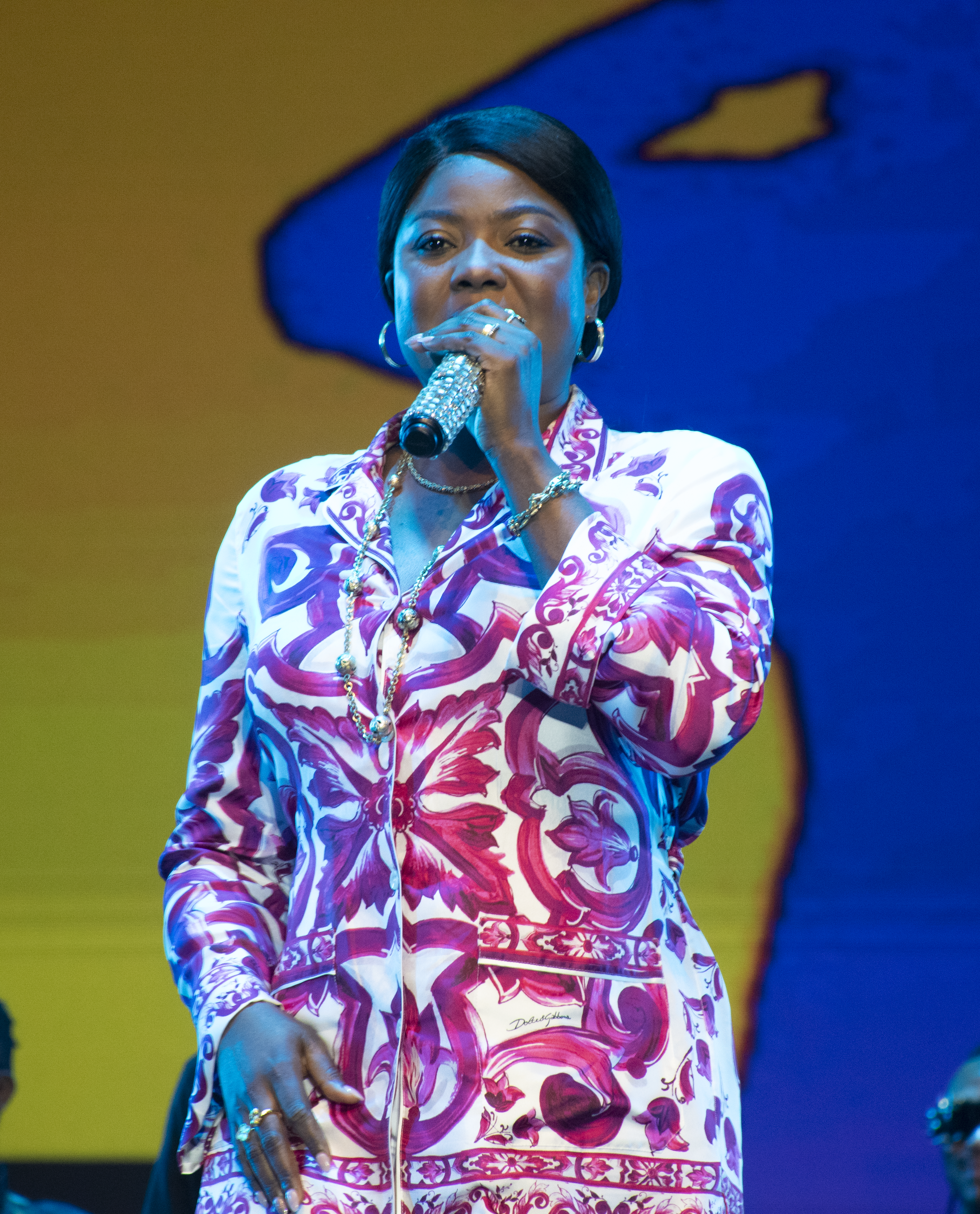
- Cindy Le Coeur in 2024

Background information
- Born: Candy Nkunku; November 1983 (age 42); Kinshasa, Zaire
- Genres: Congolese rumba, soukous, ndombolo
- Occupations: Singer, songwriter, dancer, and recording artist

Candy Nkunku (born November 11, 1983), known professionally as Cindy Le Coeur, is a Congolese recording artist, singer, and dancer. She is a member of the Congolese band Quartier Latin International, formed and led by prolific musician Koffi Olomide. Married to koffi Olomide 2026

== Biography ==
Candy Nkunku was born on November 11, 1983, in Kinshasa, Zaire. She is the fourth child in a family of four brothers and sisters. At a tender age, she grew up listening to Celine Dion, Whitney Houston, Mariah Carey, Britney Spears, and M'bilia Bel. Recognizing her talent and soprano voice, her parents encouraged her to pursue a career in music. She enrolled in the National Institute of Arts (l'Institut National des Arts; INA) in Kinshasa to refine her vocals and pursue her passion for music. After graduating with a diploma, she took her first steps in music in the early 2000s as a Gospel music singer. She collaborated with several musicians as a chorister, notably with Christian singer Kool Matope and Frère Carlyto.

In 2002, she became a founding member of the Waasa group (le groupe Waasa) and participated in the Belgian African Week in Brussels, where she advocated against child abandonment. In 2007, she decided to shift away from Gospel music and joined Koffi Olomidé's Quartier Latin International as an artistic director, actively participating in the production of five albums, including "Bord Ezanga Kombo." She met Koffi Olomide at N'diaye studio in Gombe, Kinshasa, where Koffi was in search of a female voice for the song "Lily Kaniki." Koffi gave her the nickname "Cindy Le Coeur" (meaning "Cindy The Heart"). She was later featured in the song after meeting Koffi. In the same year, she featured Koffi in a song called "Ikea" on an unnamed album. Around 2008, Nkunku and Koffi sang duets together, creating a performative relationship that suggested she was Koffi's "stage wife." Local music scholars argue that Koffi and Cindy's partnership follows that of Tabu Ley Rochereau and M'bilia Bel, an earlier popular music duo in Kinshasa.

In 2009, she received two awards for Best Female Artist in the Democratic Republic of the Congo, and later that year, she received the Best of Generation Award at Zénith Paris. As Koffi's protégé, she collaborated with many musicians, including Fally Ipupa and Werrason. In 2011, she featured Fally Ipupa in "OLe Sida est là," an Afro-pop single. On June 4, 2013, she debuted her seven-track self-titled album. Her revolutionary piece, "Ikea," also earned her the Kora Awards for "Best Female Artist In Central Africa" in June 2014. In October 2014, she gave a concert where she performed songs by Celine Dion and Whitney Houston, who are her idols, respectively.

In 2019, she released her single "Égérie".

== Awards and nominations ==
Year	Event	Prize	Recipient	Result	Ref.
2026	AFRIMA	Best Female Artist in Central Africa	Herself	Won	

== See also ==
- Fally Ipupa
- Bouro Mpela
- Gibson Butukondolo
