= Koffi Olomide =

Koffi Olomidé
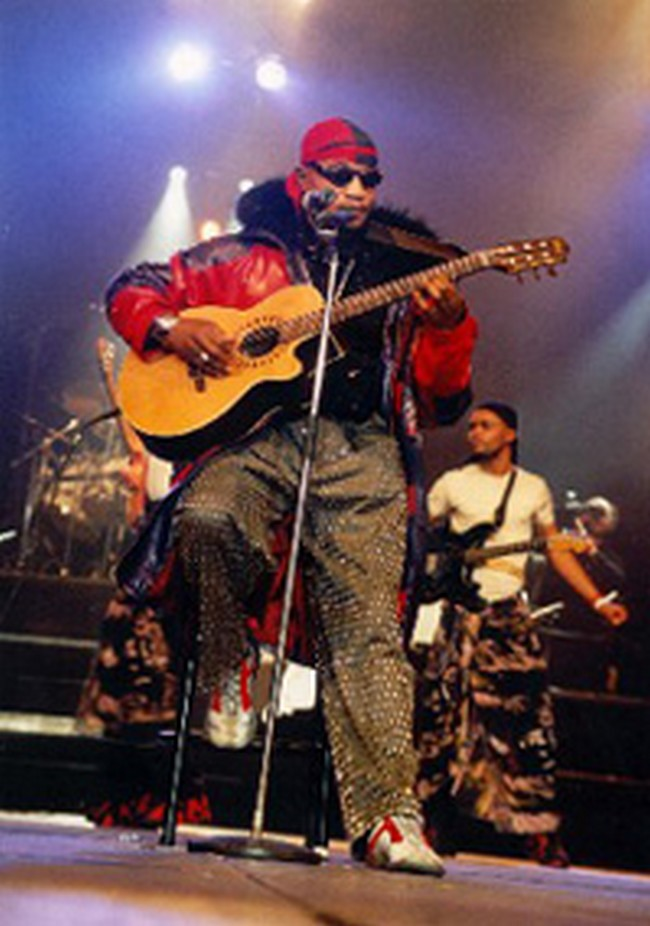
- Olomidé in 2000

Background information
- Also known as: Quadra Kora Man, Grand Mopao Mokonzi, Mukulukulu, Patraõ, Le Rambo, Nkolo Lupemba, Mokolo Bilanga, Ackram Ojé, Légende, L'Homme Aux Mille Idées, Jeune Pato, Le Grand Ché, Milkshake
- Born: Antoine Christophe Agbepa Mumba; 13 July 1956 (age 70); Stanleyville, Belgian Congo (now Kisangani, Tshopo Province)
- Genre: Soukous
- Occupations: Composer; arranger; producer; singer
- Instruments: Vocals, guitars, percussion.

Antoine Christophe Agbepa Mumba (13 July 1956), known professionally as Koffi Olomidé, is a Congolese Soukus singer, dancer, producer, and composer. He has had several gold records in his career. He is the founder of the Quartier Latin International orchestra with many notable artists, including Fally Ipupa and Ferré Gola.

== Background ==
Olomide was born on 13 July 1956 in Kisangani, DRC. His mother named him Koffi because he was born on Friday. He grew up in a middle-class family, without any musical background. During his youth, Olomide improvised by singing popular songs with his own lyrics and altered rhythms until a neighbor taught him how to play the guitar.

== Education ==
Often described by fellow students and his teachers alike as "a very bright student," Olomide earned a scholarship to study in Bordeaux, France where he obtained a bachelor's degree in business economics. He is also reported to hold a master's degree in mathematics from the University of Paris.

== Musical career ==
Upon his return to the Congo in the 1970s, Koffi joined his mentor Papa Wemba in his band Viva la Musica, initially as a composer and songwriter, and later as a lead vocalist. In 1986, he formed his band known as Quartier Latin International, which celebrated its 20th anniversary in 2006. Since then, he has performed and recorded both with the group and by himself. Over the years, he built up a faithful fan base internationally, particularly in Africa and Europe. Koffi popularized the slower style of Soukous, which he dubbed Tcha Tcho. His music can be quite controversial, taking on current events and topics considered taboo in some conservative societies. He also participated in the salsa music project Africando. For his effort, Effrakata, released in 2001, Koffi received four awards on a single night at the annual Kora Awards in South Africa for 2002 and 2003, including the award for Best African Artist, which he won in 1998. More recently, he won the Kora Award for "Best African Artist of The Decade". This established one of his many aliases, the 'Quadra Kora Man.'

== His music ==
Olomide's album Haut de Gamme: Koweït, Rive Gauche is listed in 1001 Albums You Must Hear Before You Die. In March 2003 Olomide released "Affaire D'Etat", a double CD album featuring 18 tracks. Most of his songs have the same tunes, but slightly different lyrics.

Olomide was part of the Papa Wemba musical, in the early 1980s. He has trained many young musicians, some of whom have since left his Quartier Latin band and gone solo. Some of those who have left are Fele Mudogo, Sam Tshintu, Suzuki 4x4, Soleil Wanga, Bouro Mpela, Fally Ipupa, Montana Kamenga, Ferre Gola. However, Suzuki 4x4 has recently showed up once more in some of Quartier Latin shows, along with new recruits like Cindy Le Coeur, a female singer with very high pitched vocals, recorded in the song L'Amour N'existe Pas (Love doesn't exist).

Koffi – who mostly refers to himself as "Mopao" – has a new release known as La Chicotte a Papa, having recently excelled in hits like Lovemycine, Diabolos, Grand Pretre Mere and Soupou, Cle Boa, among others. Koffi's talent could be compared to the once king of African rhumba, Franco Luambo Makiadi, who also saw many artists pass through his expert hands during his days. Today, Olomde is one of Africa's most popular musicians.

== Allegations ==
In 2012, Koffi Olomide allegedly assaulted one of his producer for abuse and no respect of contract and received a suspended three month sentence.

In July 2016, while on a concert trip to Kenya, Olomide was filmed making a kicking move towards one of his dancers. The action was widely condemned and caused the suspension of the concert as the video went viral. On his return to his home country, he was arrested five days later in Kenya Airport, allegedly for the same unpunished action. He was subsequently jailed for 4 days without judgement and released with no explanation. However, it was later revealed that the former Congolese president's wife, Mrs Olive Lembe Kabila, was behind the arrest because of her association for women's protection against violence and rape.

In, 2018 he was ordered for arrest of a photographer in Zambia, he left the country before arrest.

In 2019, He was found guilty by a French court of statutory rape of one of his former dancers when she was 15 years old. He was handed a two-year suspended jail sentence in absentia, as he did not attend court in France.

== Legacy ==
Koffi Olomide is among the greatest Congolese and African musical artists of all time. Many artists look up to him for inspiration. President Felix Tshisekedi of the Democratic Republic of Congo (DRC) recently appointed him as one of the country's cultural ambassadors.

== Discography ==
=== Studio albums ===
- Ngounda (1983, Tchika)
- Lady Bo (1984, Goal Productions)
- Celya-Ba (1985, Struggling-Man Productions)
- Ngobila (1986, Afro Rythmes)
- Diva (1986, Espera)
- Dieu Voit Tout (1987, self-released)
- Rue D'Amour (1987, O'Neill)
- Henriquet (1988, Kaluila)
- Elle Et Moi (1989, Kaluila)
- Les Prisionniers Dorment... (1990, Sonodisc)
- Haut De Gamme ''Tcha-Tcho, Echelon Ngomba'': Koweït, Rive Gauche (1992, Tamaris)
- Pas De Faux Pas (1992, Quartier Latin album, Tamaris; Sonodisc)
- Noblesse Oblige (1993, Sonodisc)
- Magie (1994, Quartier Latin album, Sonodisc)
- V12 (1995, Sonodisc)
- Ultimatum (1997, Quartier Latin, Sonodisc)
- Loi (1997, Sonodisc)
- Droit De Véto (1998, Quartier Latin album, Sonodisc)
- Attentat (1999, Sonodisc)
- Force De Frappe (2000, Quartier Latin album, Sonodisc)
- Effrakata (2001, Sonodisc)
- Affaire D'État (2003, Quartier Latin album, Sonodisc)
- Monde Arabe (2004, Sonima)
- Danger De Mort (2006, Quartier Latin album, Sonima)
- Koffi (also called L'album sans nom or Bord Ezanga Kombo) (2008, Diego Music)
- Abracadabra (2012, Rue Stendhal)
- Bana Zebola (2015, Koffi Central)
- 13ième Apôtre (2015, Koffi Central)
- Nyataquance (2017, Koffi Central)

Légende Ed Diamond 2022

=== Collaborating albums ===
- 8è Anniversaire (with Papa Wemba, Viva la Musica) (1983, Gillette D'Or)
- Aï Aï Aï La Bombe Éclate (with Rigo Star) (1987, Mayala)
- Glamour (with Duc Hérode) (1993, Air B. Mas Productions)
- Wake Up (with Papa Wemba) (1996, Sonodisc)
- Sans Rature (with Didier Milla, Madilu System, Papa Wemba) (2005, Sun Records)

== See also ==
- Fally Ipupa
- Quartier Latin International
