= Bouro Mpela =

- Birth name: Gecko Bouro Mpela
- Also known as: Bouro
- Born: 5 August 1975 (age 49); Kinshasa, Zaire
- Genres: Ndombolo
- Occupation(s): Composer singer performer dancer
- Years active: 1995–present

Gecko Bouro Mpela, also known as Bouro Mpela (born 5 August 1975), is a soukous singer, dancer, and performer from the Democratic Republic of the Congo. He was a member of the Quartier Latin International band, which was founded and led by Koffi Olomide.

== Background ==
He was born to Jean Robert Yoka Mpela and Marie Bilepo. Bouro was overweight at birth, a problem that has persisted in later life. He was born to a musical family with grandparents, parents and siblings either with careers in the industry or talented and with a passion for the trade. He attended local schools and graduated with a university degree.

== Career ==
=== The beginning ===
He was a member of his church choir. When his older brother Alain joined the band Wenge Musica, Bouro began rehearsing with him at home. He also rehearsed with Willy Bula, the younger brother of one of Alain's bandmates in Wenge. Circa 1995, Bouro began to sing and perform with several bands, while continuing with school. In 1996, Bouro graduated from university and a vacancy for a vocalist opened up at Quartier Latin International, due to the departure of Willy Bula. Bouro asks for his father's permission to become professional musician and the father accepts.

=== With Quartier Latin ===
Between 1996 and 2006, Bouro would join and leave Quartier Latin three times. While here, he recorded and released several hits, including Washington and Calvarie. He also toured with the band in Africa and Europe. He left permanently when Koffi denied him permission to produce a solo album while a member of the group. In the group's hit Inchallah, Bouro is the second to sing his solo, beginning around 2:50 minutes, after Fally Ipupa.

=== On his own ===
In 2005, with his brother Alain Mpela, he produced the album Mortel Combat. He also has other solo products, including Vice De Procedure with singles like Ecole d'amour and Kwiti ya Lokoto among other hits.

== See also ==
- Koffi Olomide
- Fally Ipupa
- Gibson Butukondolo

== Discography ==
- A list of Gecko Bouro Mpela's Songs
