= Music of the Democratic Republic of the Congo =

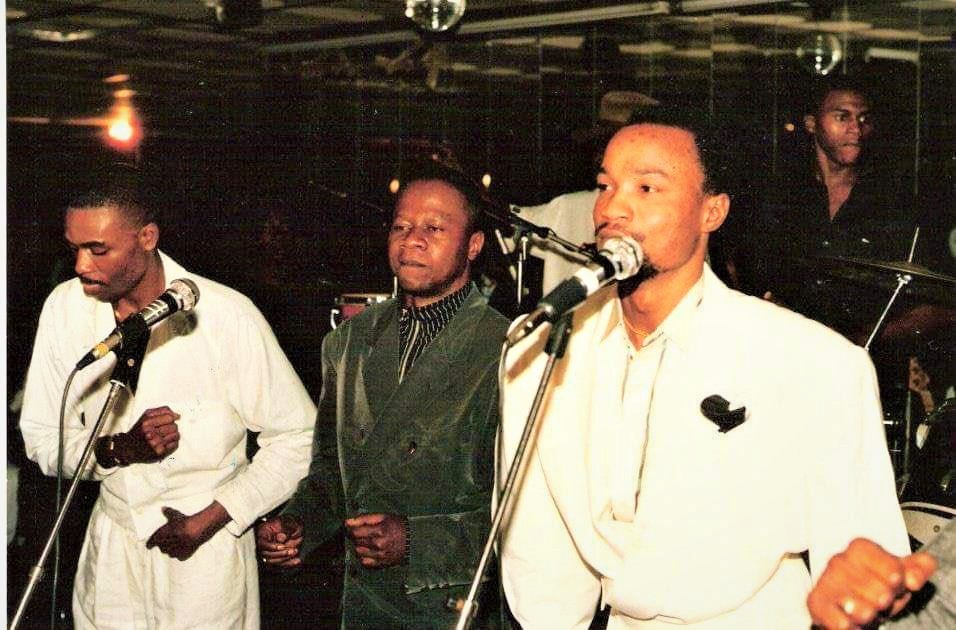
Papa Wemba and Koffi Olomide, major figures in Soukous music, performing in 1988.

Congolese music incorporates a variety of musical traditions. The traditional music serves as entertainment while expressing customs, emotions, and social values, with each ethnic group developing distinct styles of singing, dancing, and vocal expression, performed at ceremonies including births, marriages, initiations, and funerals. Instruments range from drums and slit gongs used for communication to melodic instruments such as the lamellophone sanza and arched harp. These traditions are characterized by polyrhythmic percussion, pentatonic scales, collective polyphonic singing, improvisation, vocal exclamations, handclapping, and dance. According to Indian writer Vik Sohonie, Congolese rhythms "laid the groundwork for many styles of music across the Atlantic, most notably in Haiti, Cuba, and Brazil. Its guitar styles caressed Africa, inspiring artists from Senegal to Somalia to South Africa to South Sudan".

Congolese popular music developed alongside the urban growth of Léopoldville (now Kinshasa) in the 1930s and the expansion of colonial commercial enterprises, which exposed local musicians to global genres such as Cuban rumba, jazz, blues, biguine, highlife, and bolero. Among the key transitional genres was the Kongo partner maringa dance, which originated in the former Kingdom of Loango, and later flourished in the bar-dancing culture of Brazzaville and Léopoldville in the 1920s–1940s, with early performances using instruments such as the bass drum, accordion (likembe), and glass bottles used as percussion. During the 1940s and 1950s, the arrival of Cuban son recordings played a major role in maringa's transformation into "Congolese rumba", as works by groups like Sexteto Habanero, Trio Matamoros, and Los Guaracheros de Oriente were often marketed as "rumba".

During the 1960s and 1970s, Congolese rumba gave birth to a wave of innovative popular dance styles, including soukous, a faster-paced genre known for its intricate guitar work and layered polyrhythms. In the late 1990s, ndombolo emerged as an offshoot of soukous and also rose to continental prominence. Throughout this evolution, there has never been a single, universally accepted term for Congolese popular music. It was once commonly referred to as muziki na biso ("our music"), while today the term ndule, meaning "music" in Lingala, is more widely used. Labels such as "rumba" or "rock-rumba" are also applied broadly, though they remain imprecise.

== Traditional music and instruments ==
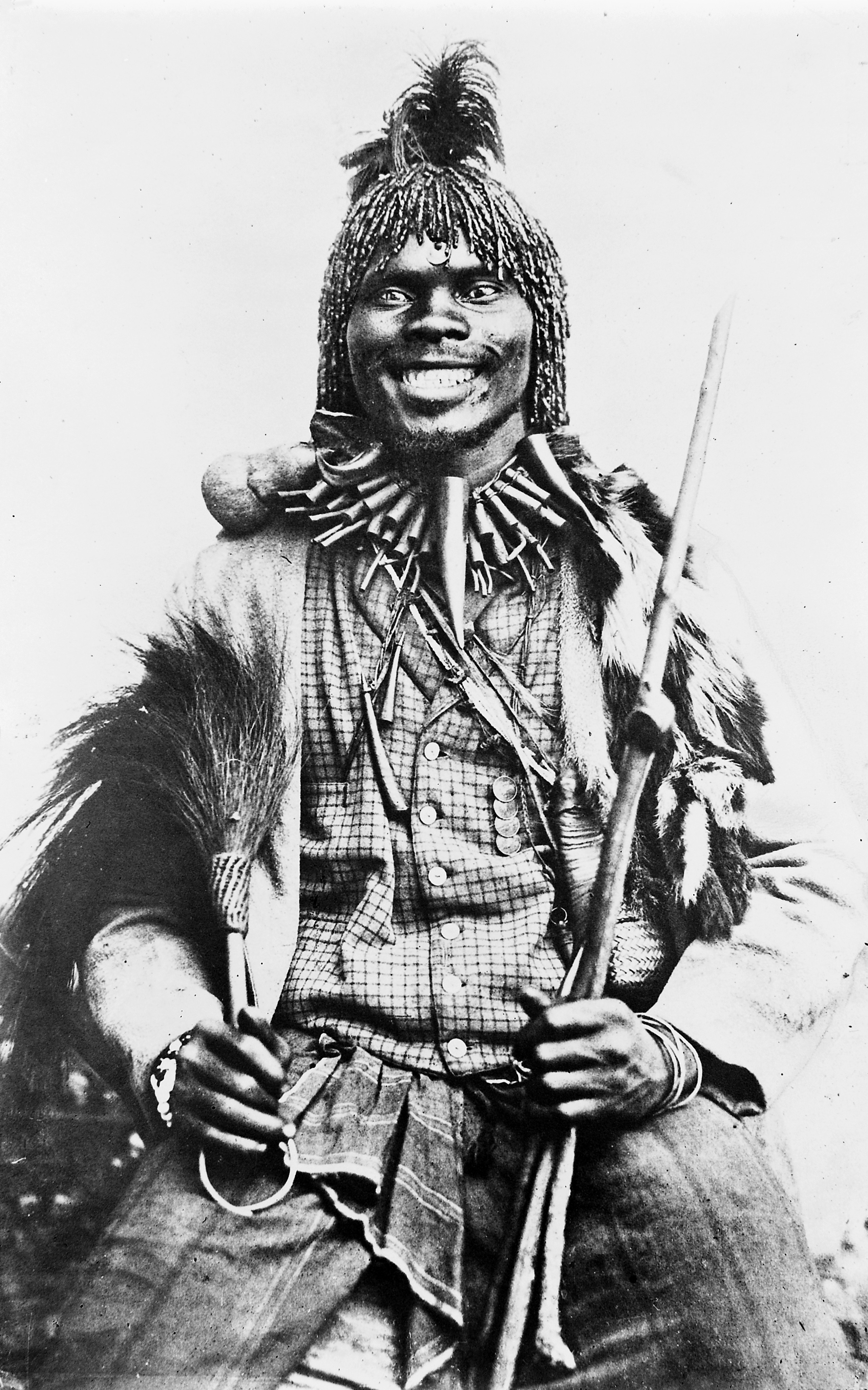
A Bangongo diviner (singular: Ngongo) employing traditional methods to identify suitable treatments through divination. Belgian Congo.

The Democratic Republic of the Congo is one of Africa's most ethnically diverse nations, with more than 250 to 450 ethnic groups generally grouped into four major ethnolinguistic families: Bantu, Central Sudanic, Nilotic, and Pygmy (often identified as Indigenous peoples). Bantu peoples account for nearly 80 percent of the population across the western, central, and southeastern regions of the country. Central Sudanic groups, including the Ngbandi, Zande, Mangbetu, and Lugbara, are concentrated mainly in the northern and northwestern areas. Nilotic groups such as the Alur, Lendu, and Hema (many of whom have Bantu ancestry) are also present. The Pygmy classification includes groups like the Mbuti, Twa, and Baka.

Each ethnic group has its own distinctive musical and dance traditions, which are expressed through songs, dances, and ritual chants. Traditional Congolese music is characterized by anhemitonic pentatonic scales and a strong emphasis on polyphonic vocal textures, where overlapping voices blend without rigid melodic structures. While a basic melodic framework may be introduced, individual singers interpret it freely. Music serves an important social function in accompanying religious ceremonies, life-cycle events such as births, weddings, and funerals, and communal labor. Although many traditional instruments were historically created for musical performance, others, such as the tam-tam and lokole, also functioned as communication devices that conveyed coded messages to nearby villages through a nuanced auditory language. According to Congolese columnist Samuel Malonga Nkilutomba Luba Mabitidi, the use of traditional instruments has sharply declined in urban areas, where modern bands favor contemporary instruments. He argues that this change has weakened the sacred dimension of ancestral music and diminished the authentic African spirit traditionally associated with it. He also notes that as modern influences grow, "ethno-tribal" musical forms and instruments are being pushed to the margins, but some contemporary musicians still draw on these traditions, even if only in limited ways.

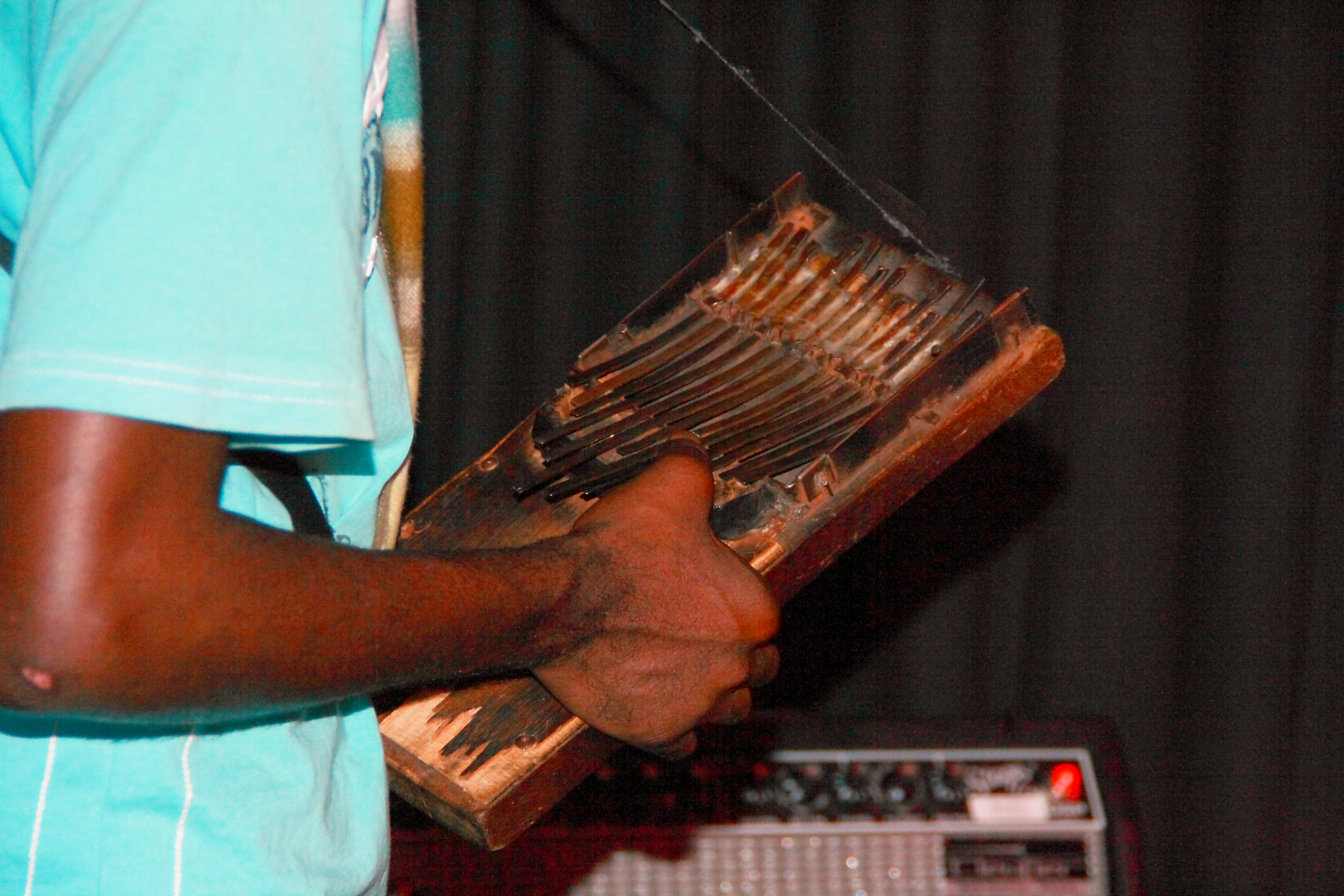
A member of the Kinshasa-based band Konono Nº1 playing the likembe

Most instruments are handcrafted from wood derived from indigenous plant species, though wood is not the sole material, as iron and various animal-derived elements, such as skin and horn, are also commonly employed. These instruments are built by artisans and are played at social events like festivals, weddings, and community gatherings, as well as at traditional and cultural ceremonies such as initiation rites, birth and mourning rituals, village councils, circumcision, and other rites of passage.

Some instruments have changed over time due to new technology. For instance, the Zombo folklore band Konono Nº1 modified the likembe (a type of sanza) by adding electric amplification to make it louder for modern performances. Historically, instruments such as these were mainly used to support dances and chants during major ethnic celebrations. They were also seen as a way to express feelings such as attraction, romance, poetry, joy, and excitement.

In the general classification of African musical instruments, those from the Congo are grouped into four main types: aerophones, chordophones, idiophones, and membranophones.

=== Aerophones ===
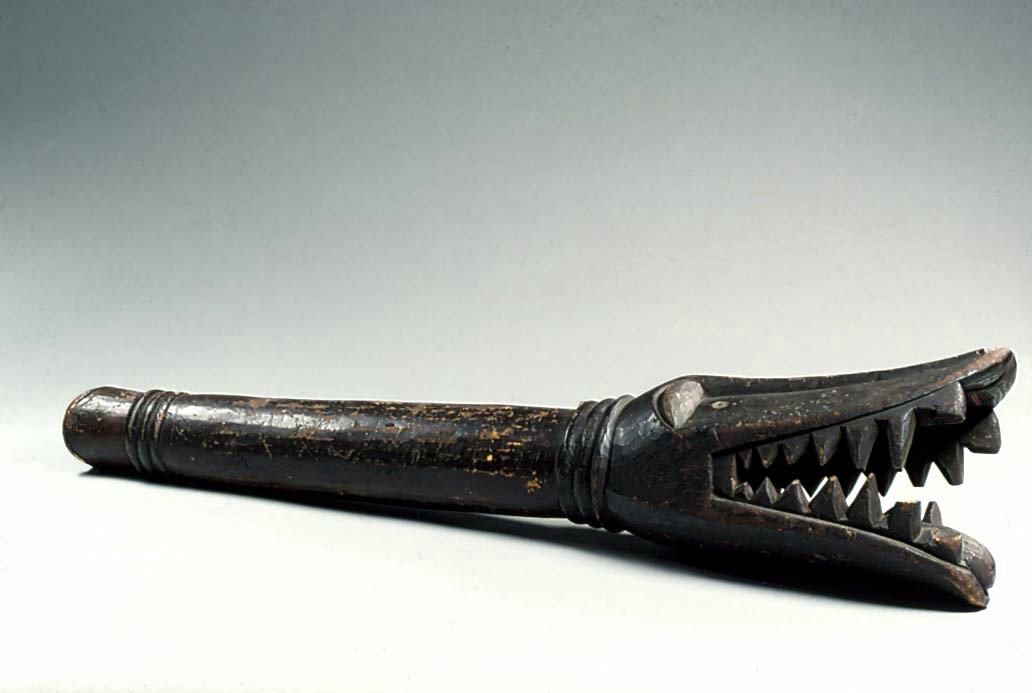
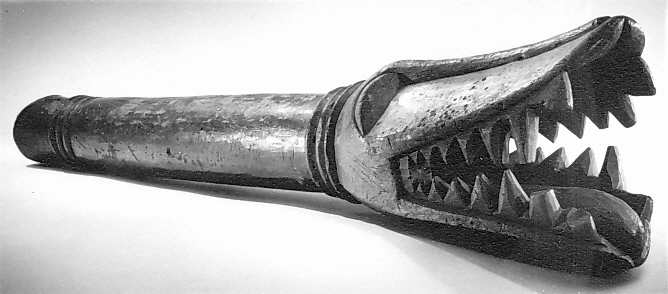
Traditional Congolese megaphone, possibly dating to the 18th century, from the Crosby Brown Collection of Musical Instruments.

Aerophones in Congolese music include different types of flutes and trumpets. They are usually made from materials that are easy to find locally, such as bamboo, wood, and hollow plant stems. Wooden trumpets are especially common among groups such as the Bakwa-Mputu of Kasaï, the Mangbetu, and the Pygmies. These instruments have different names depending on the language and ethnic group. For example, they are called mpanda among the Barega, mpungi in Kikongo, and under a variety of names among the Teke, such as mvila mvili, mupara, munguani, mbabiyimi, nkuanku, and kô. The Bahungana refer to their trumpet as musembu.

Flutes are widely used and come in many forms. The transverse flute, made from bamboo or wood, often has up to five finger holes. It is referred to as mulizi by the Shi people of South Kivu, mpuela or tuti in Kikongo, and ndere among the Hema. End-blown flutes share similar names in Kikongo (tuti, mpuela) and include nasal flute variants, particularly used by the Yanzi people of Kwango. Pan flutes are another notable subtype, known as bitanda among the Yaka, nshiba among the Luba, mishiba among the Songye, and mishiy among the Lunda. Kikongo speakers use several terms for this instrument, including kwanga, makwanga, and mavonda. Additionally, the globular flute, a spherical wind instrument, is found among the Mongo, where it is called lofolongo, and among the Bembe, who refer to it as kitolori.

=== Chordophones ===
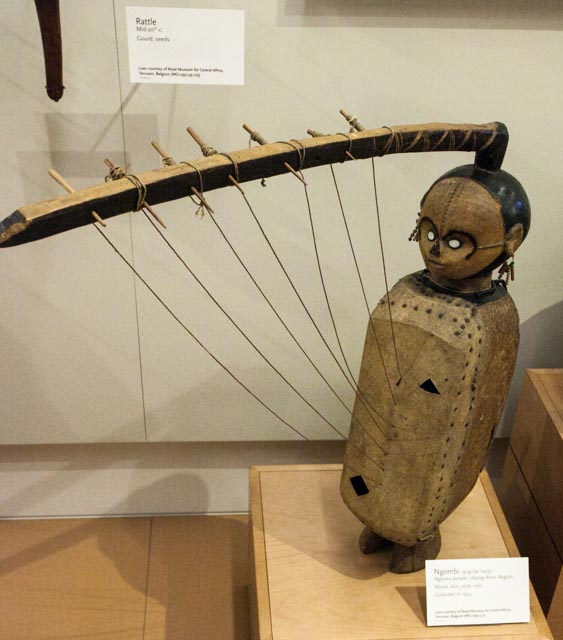
An ngombi arched harp from the Democratic Republic of the Congo, currently in the collection of the Musical Instrument Museum (MIM), Phoenix, Arizona; likely collected in 1910, as indicated by the visible tag.

The strings are usually made from natural materials such as raffia fibers, bark strips, giraffe tail hair, or iron wire. One well-known instrument is the pluriarc, a type of multi-string bow-lute. It is known by different names in different areas, including longombe among the Nkundo, lungoyongoyo in Kikongo, ngweme among the Teke, and motumbe among the Ngombe. Another notable instrument is the arched harp, a bowed string instrument with deep cultural roots, referred to as kundi among the Zande, domu among the Mangbetu, and seto among the Ngbandi. The stick zither, another widely distributed instrument, is known by various names: enanga (Nande), esanzo (Mongo), inanga (Lega and Kirundi), langangu (Mbunda), lulanga (Shi), lunzenze (Luba-Kasai), and nedongu (Mangbetu).

One of the most widespread and culturally significant instruments is the musical bow, which often comes from a hunting bow. It is turned into a musical instrument when a resonating gourd is attached, and a string stretched across its frame. It is usually played in a vertical position and is found among many ethnic groups in the Congo. The mouth bow, a variant of the musical bow, incorporates the performer's mouth as a resonating chamber. The string is held between the lips, and the vibrations are produced by striking the string with a stick. The musical bow and its variants are known by a wide array of vernacular names. Among the Pygmies, it is called belumu; among the Boma, dweme or ngomi; and among the Nande, ekibulenge or zeze. Other names include kadad (Lunda), lingungu (Lega), longofi (Mangbetu), longombi (Mongo), lukungu (Pende), lunkombe or nkutu kubidi (Luba-Kasai), lusuba (Luba-Katanga), mbela (Ngbaka), nedungu or nelingoti (Mangbetu), nguém (Teke), nzenze (Shi), and rukung (Lunda). The earth-bow, a further derivative of the musical bow in which the ground serves as the resonating chamber, shares these same vernacular names.

=== Idiophones ===
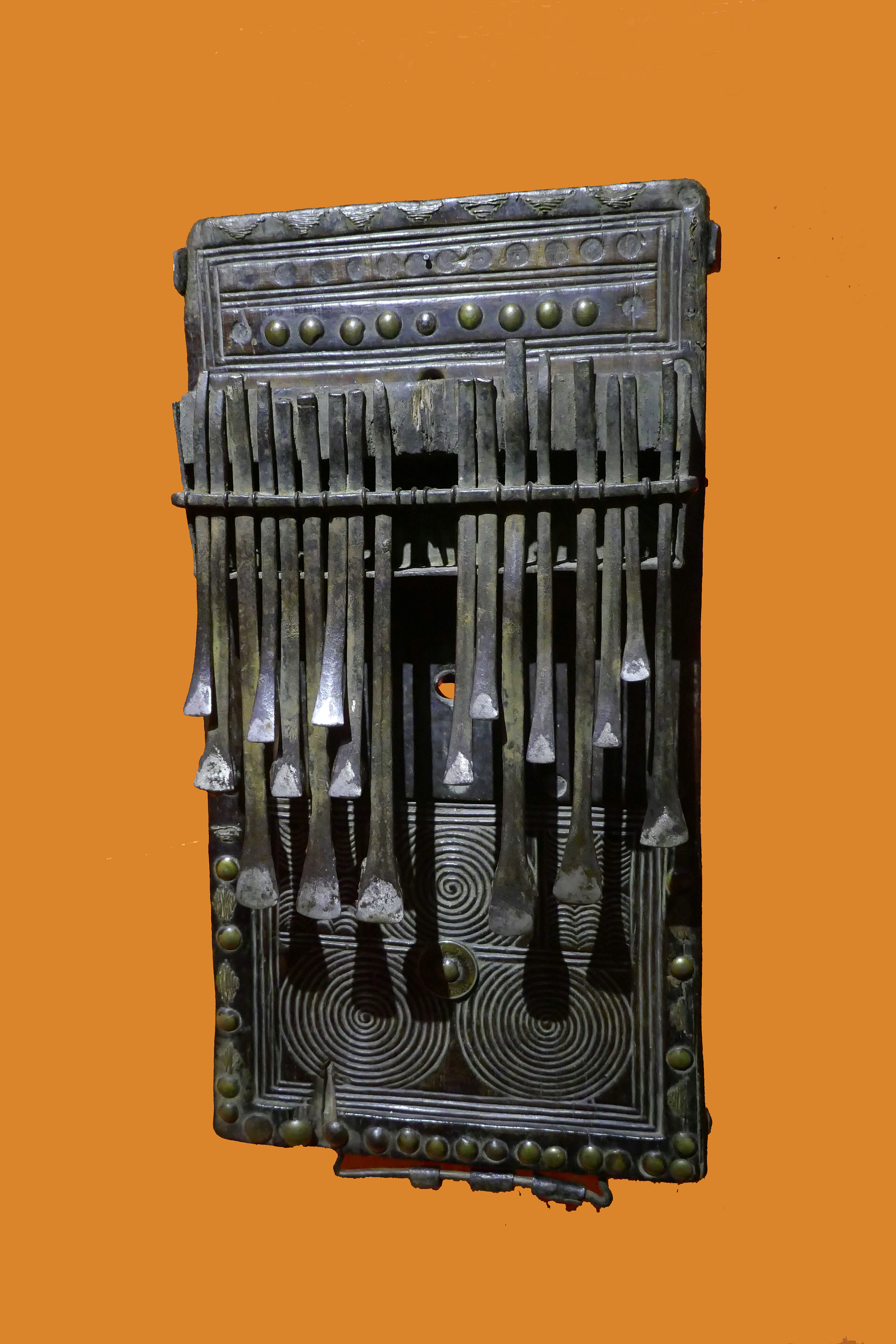
Chisonji lamellophone crafted by an unknown artist of the Chokwe people, late 19th century. Made of wood and iron, this intricately decorated instrument is housed at the Musical Instrument Museum in Phoenix and was featured in the exhibition Frapper le fer: L'art des forgerons africains at the Musée du Quai Branly – Jacques Chirac in Paris, France.

One of the most prominent Congolese idiophones is the sanza, a lamellophone that is often referred to by outsiders as the "thumb piano" and consists of a rectangular wooden box, usually hollowed, onto which metallic or vegetal lamellae of varying lengths are affixed. The number of lamellae can range from six to twenty, with ten being most common, as among the Pende. Widespread throughout sub-Saharan Africa, the sanza has no direct counterpart in the Western instrumental tradition. Its influence extended beyond the African continent through the transatlantic slave trade, leading to variations such as the marímbula in Cuba, manuba in Haiti, and the rumba box or "thumb piano" in Jamaica. Archaeological evidence places its origins at least 3,000 years ago in what is now Cameroon. Congolese musicologist Michel Ngongo has posited a historical and musical connection between the sanza and the development of the solo guitar in Congolese popular music, a phenomenon unique in Africa, where one guitarist often assumes an exclusive melodic role. Among Congolese ethnic groups, the sanza is known by a variety of vernacular names, including tshisanji tsha nzadi (Tshiluba), sambi or ndara (Kikongo), likembe (Lingala), kisanji (Teke), and esanzo (Nkundo).

Other idiophones include a range of shaken instruments, most notably the rattle, which is considered a prototype form of the maracas and is used widely in traditional music, including by atalaku performers in popular dance music. These rattles often lack handles and come in diverse forms, gourd, woven, spherical, or metallic. The gourd rattle, for instance, is known as mukwanga or nkwanga in Kikongo. Other names for rattles across Congolese languages include pedo (Swahili), disaka (Tshilubà), kinsakala, nsakala, nsansi (Kikongo), kisakasaka (Lingala), sheker (in music), tshotsha (Tshokwe), wanga (Ngbaka), yatsh (Kuba), and zeze (Ngbandi). Bells are another form of idiophone, commonly used as rhythmic accents and worn by tam-tam drummers. In Kikongo, the bell is referred to as kiozi, nkembi a moko ("hand rattle"), or nsansi. In Cuba, a similar small bell used in Afro-Caribbean music is also known as nkembi.

Friction idiophones are also present in Congolese music, notably the scraper, which may have originated in the DRC. The instrument, similar to the Latin American güiro, is played by scraping a stick or other object along a ridged surface. Among Congolese peoples, this instrument bears different names, including mvunku (Tshiluba), munkwaka (Kikongo), dikwakasa (Luba of Katanga), and mukwasa (Mai-Ndombe). Through the Atlantic slave trade, the scraper traveled to the Americas, where it evolved into forms now commonly found throughout Latin American music traditions.

==== Struck or percussion idiophones ====
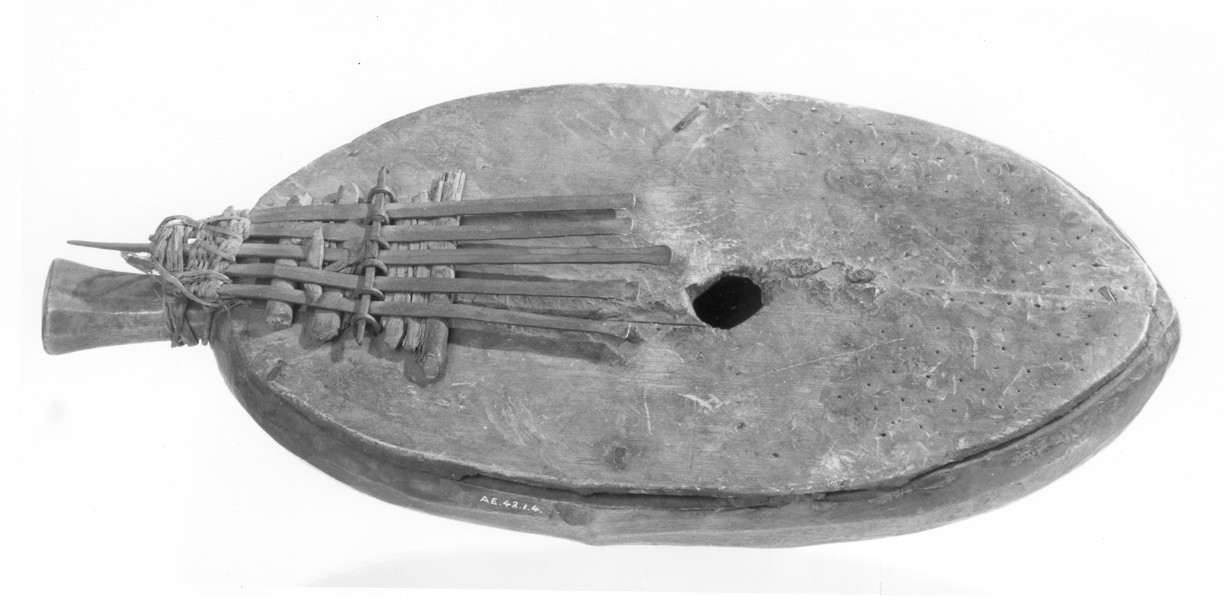
A traditional sanza of the Budu people, featuring metal keys affixed to a wooden resonator box, currently housed at the Museum aan de Stroom (MAS) in Antwerp, Belgium.

Struck or percussion idiophones are also abundant, with one of the most significant being the xylophone, which is known in West Africa as the balafon and is widely regarded as a precursor to modern keyboard instruments such as the synthesizer. Among Congolese groups, the xylophone is recognized under numerous vernacular names: pandingbwa (Zande), madimba (Kikongo, Luba, Pende), anemba (Tetela), bifanda (Yaka), djimba (Chokwe), dujimba (Lunda), didimba-dimba (Luba Katanga), endara (Nande), gbengbe (Budja), manza and bandjanda (Ngbaka, Ngbandi), and midimb (Lunda). Another ancient percussion idiophone is the gong, specifically the double metal bell, which is considered one of the oldest musical instruments in the Congo. Traditionally used in dance accompaniment and later adopted into religious ceremonies by groups such as the L'Église du Saint-Esprit (Bangunza), the gong is played with a stick, alternating between the two bells. It is referred to by various names, including ngongi (Kikongo), ngonga (Tshiluba), kengele (Swahili), lubembo (Katanga), and munku or inkoro (Teke).

Unconventional objects, such as an empty glass bottle, are sometimes used as idiophones as well. Most often, beer bottles are employed, held vertically and struck with a spoon to produce a percussive sound. The human body itself can function as an idiophone in traditional dance contexts, through clapping, mouth-slapping, and rhythmic stomping (techniques that generate communal energy and enhance the festive atmosphere). Among the most distinctive idiophones in Congo are the wooden slit drums, such as the lokombe and lokole. The lokombe, a trapezoid-shaped instrument found primarily among the Tetela and Barega, is a type of tam-tam played with two sticks. Carved from special tree trunks, it is also used for long-distance communication. The lokole, in contrast to membranophones, does not use animal hide but relies instead on a resonating slit carved into its body. Believed to have originated among the Mongo people, slit drums are made in various shapes, trapezoidal, cylindrical, tulip-shaped, half-moon, or even sculpted to resemble animals. Their resonance often surpasses that of skin drums. The instrument is known by a vast array of vernacular names, mirroring its widespread use: itwoomba (Kuba), tshondo (Tshiluba, Swahili), mondo, mukonzi, nkonko, kiondo (Kikongo), kyondo (Kiluba), boungou (Lokele), bugu or gugu (Zande), gbugbu (Ngbandi), kiyondo (Songye), lokole (Batwa and Mongo), mandru (Mangbetu), mond (Lunda), mongungu (Ngombe), ndundu (Pygmies), tshingufu (Chokwe), and mukoku ngombu (Yaka). A particularly large trapezoidal version is known as lukumbi or nkumvi in Kikongo.

=== Membranophones ===
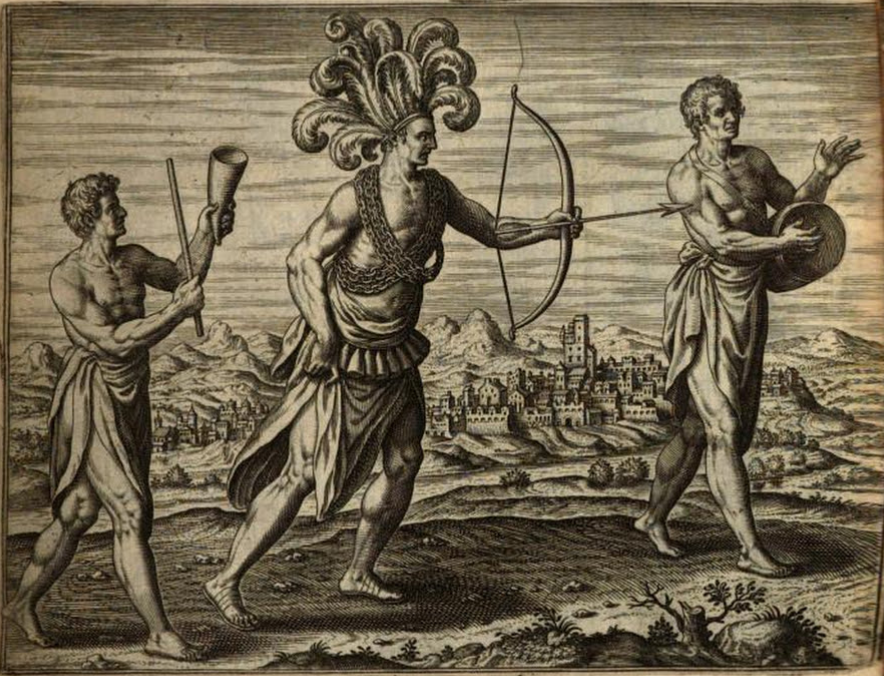
A 1598 illustration by Theodor de Bry from Regnum Congo: Regnvm Congo hoc est Vera descriptio regni Africani, qvod tam ab incolis qvam Lvsitanis Congus appellatur by Filippo Pigafetta, depicting warriors of the Kingdom of Kongo. The scene features native soldiers, including a noble archer adorned with a feathered headdress, accompanied by others carrying traditional instruments such as a tam-tam drum and horn. Captioned in Latin: "Armatura tam nobiliorum quam gregariorum militum descripta lib. 1 cap. 7".

Among Congolese membranophones, the drum, commonly referred to as tam-tam or ngoma, is often regarded as the "king" of traditional instruments, as it is present in nearly all Congolese cultures and performs an essential musical and social role, much like the solo guitar in popular music, by providing the primary rhythmic drive that compels audiences to dance. Typically carved from long, hollowed-out tree trunks, with each community selecting wood native to its region, these drums vary widely in size, construction, and nomenclature. The standard drum shape is cylindrical, and the membrane (usually made of animal hide such as cow, goat, antelope, or sheep) is stretched over a wooden frame and secured with nails or woven cords. A paste is often applied to the center of the membrane to produce a distinctive tonal quality, and tuning is commonly achieved by heating the drum over a fire.

Performance techniques vary, with drums played either with bare hands or sticks, and sometimes accompanied by bells worn on the wrists to enhance rhythmic texture. Drummers generally play standing, with the instrument tied to the waist and held obliquely between the legs. Drums vary significantly in size, from large instruments over a meter in height to smaller variants, depending on the cultural context. Beyond its musical function, the drum historically served as a "talking instrument", capable of transmitting coded messages to surrounding communities. These rhythmic signals could announce births, funerals, enemy attacks, harvests, or communal events such as market days. While this communicative role has diminished over time, it once constituted a vital part of rural social organization.

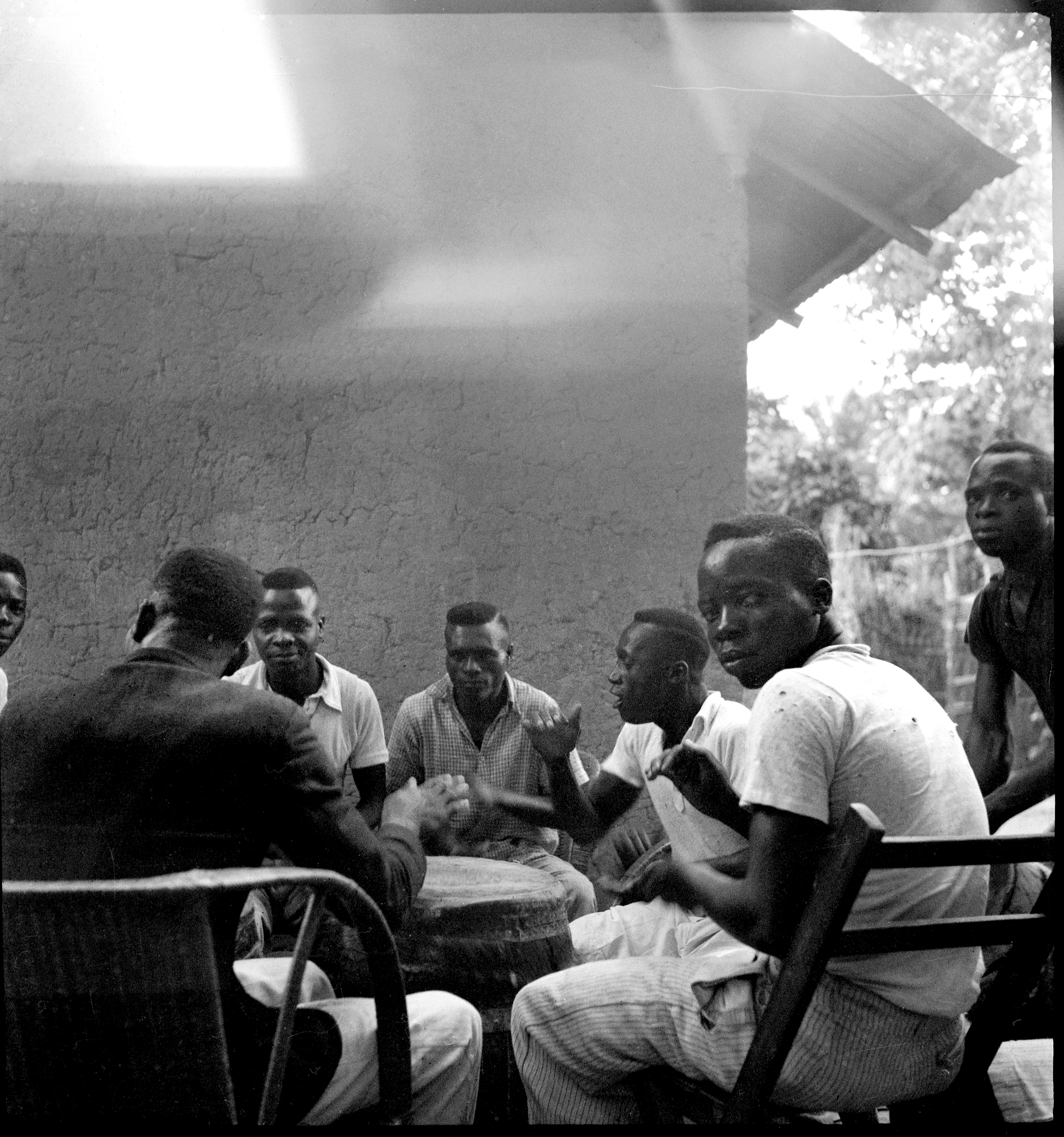
A group of Congolese men gathered in a circle performing on a tam-tam (drum) in Léopoldville, present-day Kinshasa.

There are an estimated 300 distinct types of drums in the DRC. The drum is generically known as ngoma across several languages, including Kikongo, Swahili, Tshiluba, Lingala (where mbonda is also used), and among numerous other Bantu-speaking populations. Specific drum types bear more localized names: mu ngoma-ngoma (Kongo), mongei (Teke), mungele (Bangongo), mungiedi (Bahungana), bulup (Kuba), ngomo (Bahungana), ditumba (Luba of Kasaï and Katanga), mukupela (large Tshokwe drum), ndungu (elongated conical Kongo drum), ngomonene, mumbomba, and idudu (various Teke drums). The double-membrane drum, with skins on both ends of a cylindrical body, is carried on the shoulder and played with one hand and one stick; in Kikongo, it is called bandi, a name derived from the English word "band". The friction drum, a unique membranophone found across Congo, is played by rubbing a stick or similar implement across the membrane to produce resonant, vibratory sounds. This instrument is widely distributed and known by a variety of vernacular names: kwita (Chokwe), mfing nene (Mbunda), mondo (Yaka), mondule (Ekonda), mpwit (Lunda), ngoma i pwita (Tshiluba), mukwiti, kingulu-ngulu, nkwiti (Kikongo), pwita (Songye), koy na bula (Kuba, Pende), and ngoma wa bimrunku or tambwe ngoma (Kanyoka). In Cuba, the instrument is known as kinfuiti, a term believed to be a linguistic transformation of the Kikongo word nkwiti.

Less common but still culturally significant is the frame drum, particularly among the Kongo and Pende peoples. Circular in form, the frame drum is played with the hands, and tonal variation is achieved by applying pressure to the membrane with the heel of the palm. The instrument is traditionally played while seated, with the drum held between the legs. Among the Luba-Shankadi, it is called tambur (a distortion of the French tambour), and among the Luba of Kasaï, the generic term ngoma is used. The patenge, a specific variant, is thought to have influenced the development of Cuban bongos. The talking drum, known as ntambu in Kikongo, is recognized for its ritual and communicative roles.

== History of popular music ==
=== Languages ===
Lingala is by far the most widely used language in Congolese popular music. It is followed by the country's other national languages, such as Kikongo ya Leta (also called Munu Kutuba), Swahili, and Tshiluba, although their role remains much smaller in comparison, since Lingala overwhelmingly dominates most songs.

Although the Democratic Republic of the Congo is home to around 450 dialects, very few are strongly represented in popular music. Most remain largely invisible because Lingala's overwhelming influence leaves little room for them to thrive artistically. Many ethnic languages have consequently faded into relative obscurity, while the remaining national languages continue to serve mostly supporting roles. The preservation of many endangered mother tongues are primarily safeguarded by folk performers and griots, who use them to maintain and celebrate their cultural traditions and ethnic identities to keep older musical forms and rhythms alive, which prevents them from disappearing completely. Some major Congolese musicians periodically revisit their cultural roots by seeking inspiration from rural and village-based folklore, and, through this process, modern Congolese popular music incorporates the language and expressive forms of villagers and griots, which gives traditional culture a place within modern artistic expression.

Between 1950 and 1980, several musicians actively worked to promote indigenous dialects in their music. Alongside Lingala songs, adapted pieces from traditional repertoires became part of the canon of modern Congolese popular music. Over time, village languages gradually found their way into urban modernity, even though this process was difficult. Congolese columnist Samuel Malonga Nkilutomba Luba Mabitidi noted that, although songs entirely performed in dialects are much less common than Lingala songs, they nevertheless maintain an important cultural presence. He also pointed out that modern Congolese popular music incorporates languages such as Bobangi, Mbuza, Kiyanzi, Kimongo, Kitetela, Sangha-Sangha, and Kingombe, together with multiple dialects of Kikongo, including Kilemfu, Kintandu, Kimanianga, Kindibu, Kisansla, Kisi Ngombe, and Lari. In some cases, musicians have even chosen to sing in dialects outside their own linguistic backgrounds.

=== Colonial times (pre-1960) ===
Since the colonial era, Léopoldville (Kinshasa) has been a major center of musical development in Central Africa. The country itself was formed from many different ethnic territories, most of which had little shared cultural background. Each group kept its own folk music traditions, and a shared Congolese musical identity only began to develop in the 1940s. In both the former French Congo (now the Republic of the Congo) and Belgian Congo (now Democratic Republic of the Congo), the popular partnered dance music was initially known as maringa. This dance came from the Kongo people of the former Kingdom of Loango, an area that included parts of today's Republic of the Congo, southern Gabon, and Angola's Cabinda Province. Maringa utilized a combination of traditional instruments such as the patengé (a small frame drum), a glass bottle used as a triangle, and a variant of the likembe (a thumb piano) with steel reeds. The dance was characterized by a rhythmic swaying of the hips, alternating weight from leg to leg, and was stylistically reminiscent of the Afro-Cuban rumba. By the 1930s, this type of partner dance had spread widely across the Congo region. According to ethnomusicologist Kazadi wa Mukuna, early recording studios began to market maringa as "rumba", blending in the newer rumba rhythm while keeping the original name. Scholar Phyllis Martin also noted that members of the European elite in Brazzaville showed interest in Latin American music, especially after Cuban rumba was presented at the 1932 Chicago World's Fair, which helped encourage this change. Nonetheless, both colonial and African elites often favored dances like the tango and the biguine. In 1934, Jean Réal, a French director of entertainment from Martinique, coined the term "Congo Rumba" when he founded a band of the same name in Brazzaville in 1938. Soon after, several institutions that played a key role in the growth of Congolese popular music were founded. Olympia and its related record labels (Novelty, Kongo Bina, and Lomeka) were established in 1939 by Fernand Jansens and Albert Patou. In 1941, Jean Hourdebise created Studio Congolia, linked to Radio Congolia. In August 1941, Congolese musicologist Emmanuel Okamba documented the formation of Victoria Brazza, an ensemble led by Paul Kamba in Poto-Poto, Brazzaville. The band combined the maringa rhythm with modern instrumentation, including accordion, guitar, mandolin, and banjo, creating what would become known as modern Congolese rumba, a fusion of programmable modern sounds with the intuitive, non-programmable textures of traditional instruments.

A similar development occurred in Kinshasa, where vocalist Antoine Wendo Kolosoy formed the band Victoria-Kin in 1943, which employed instruments such as the patenge, the mukwasa (a scraper), and a bass drum. Wendo became well known along the Congo River region and performed with as many as 15 singers, including his cousin Léon Yangu Mbale. His work inspired Henri Bowane, born in Mbandaka to a Congolese father from Brazzaville, who briefly formed the vocal group Victoria-Coquilathville before settling in Kinshasa on 25 December 1949. Bowane played a central role in the promotion of Kinshasa's evolving rumba style, particularly following the founding of key recording companies such as Ngoma (by John Nicolas Jeronimidis) and Kina (by Gabriel Benatar) in 1948. Cuban son music, performed by groups like Sexteto Habanero, Trio Matamoros, and Los Guaracheros de Oriente, was simultaneously broadcast on Radio Congo Belge in Kinshasa. Musicians adapted son's instrumentation, piano, percussion, and brass, by transposing these elements onto electric guitars and saxophones, sometimes singing in phonetic Spanish or French. Over time, Congolese artists began to include more local rhythms and melodic patterns in their music. The term "Congolese rumba" itself developed partly because imported Cuban records were often labeled as "rumba" by distributors. According to Kazadi wa Mukuna, Congolese rumba was not a direct adaptation of Cuban dance forms, but rather a reinterpretation of the name and instrumentation, while still drawing on the maringa rhythm as a base. He argued that the name "rumba" was retained primarily for commercial appeal. In practice, musicians gravitated back to patterns that could be more readily integrated with newly acquired instruments and aligned with traditional music and dance structures.

Before the establishment of formal bands, early Congolese music was dominated by solo singers, such as Antoine Wendo Kolosoy, Henri Bowane, Léon Bukasa, Antoine Kasongo Kitenge, Camille Feruzi, Adou Elenga, Baudouin Mavula, Jean Bosco Mwenda wa Bayeke, Baba Gaston, Kabongo Paris, and Manoka Desaïo. On the female front, pioneering figures between 1951 and 1959 included Lucie Eyenga (considered the first woman in sub-Saharan Africa to record music), Tekele Mokango, Anne Ako, the duos Esther Sudila & Léonine Mbongo, Jeanne Ninin & Caroline Mpia, as well as Marie Kitoto, Albertine Ndaye, Martha Badibala, Pauline Lisanga, and Marcelle Ebibi, the latter being Cameroonian-born and married to Guy-Léon Fylla of Brazzaville.

Following World War II, a group of coastal West Africans, referred to locally as the Popo and placed below Europeans and métis (mixed-race) in the colonial social hierarchy, settled in the Belgian Congo as accountants and administrators. To occupy their leisure time, they formed the Excelsior Orchestra in Boma. This group was modeled on Ghana's Excelsior of Accra (founded in 1914 by Franck Torto) and performed on weekends in rudimentary bars and public spaces. Their repertoire included maringa and highlife played on European instruments such as guitar, saxophone, chromatic accordion, trumpet, and piano. According to Bowane, this group later gave rise to a second formation, Jazz Popo, which served as a significant influence on emerging Congolese musicians.

In 1942, historian Kanza Matondo records the formation of three Congolese brass orchestras: Odéon, led by Kabamba and Booth; Américain, led by brothers Alex and André Tshibangu; and Martinique, founded by Kasongo, Fernandès, Booth, and Malonga. These groups marked the early development of organized, group-based music in the Congo. Other sources, including Jean-Pierre François Nimy Nzonga, Mfumu Fylla Saint-Eudes, and online records, mention several vocal and brass groups that were active in the 1940s. Chief among them was Odéon Kinois, made up mostly of former students from the Boma Colonial School (Colonie Scolaire de Boma). It was led by Justin Disasi, a playwright who later became mayor of Kalamu in 1956. The group was started through the efforts of Eugène Kabamba, a civil servant in the Ministry of Finance and president of Assanef (Association des anciens élèves des Frères des écoles chrétiennes). In 1947, Disasi assumed leadership of the orchestra Melo Kin, a Kinshasa-based successor to Melo Congo, which had been founded in Brazzaville by saxophonist Emmanuel Dadet. Disasi's tenure at Odéon Kinois concluded that same year when he was succeeded by trumpeter René Kisumuna, a fellow alumnus of the Boma school. At this time, Odéon Kinois was one of the leading orchestras in Kinshasa, but it soon faced competition from other groups such as Américain and splinter groups led by musicians like Antoine Kasongo Kitenge and Jean Lopongo. Lopongo's group later performed at Siluvangi Bar, a venue that had previously hosted Camille Feruzi's orchestra.

Odéon Kinois, most commonly linked to Disasi, should not be conflated with the similarly named ensemble founded by Kabamba and Booth, nor with Odéon Vocal, led by Léon Yayu and Mulangi. All three groups appeared in 1942 in Kinshasa, but they were separate formations. The Américain orchestra, founded in 1945 and led by Pierre Disu, developed in a context influenced by the presence of American military personnel at Ndolo airfield during World War II. These troops, who were stationed there to monitor Soviet submarine activity, introduced local audiences to New Orleans-style jazz performances. Both Américain and Odéon Kinois required members to have proficiency in musical notation (solfège). According to Antoine Wendo, the earliest Congolese ensemble predating the influence of the Coastmen and the Excelsior Orchestra was that of Antoine Kasongo Kitenge, a clarinetist and later saxophonist originally from Maniema. He trained in the brass band of Sainte-Cécile School in Kintambo, where he later worked with Jean Lopongo. Kasongo went on to form his own jazz orchestra, which played at public dances in Parc de Bock (now Kinshasa Botanical Garden). Although some sources, including musicologist Clément Ossinondé, have linked his group to Odéon Kinois, they were in fact separate bands.

The Martinique Orchestra was led by Rufin Mutinga, who was described as "deputy assistant to the first burgomaster". The origin of the group's name is not fully clear. According to Matondo, it likely derived its name from the cultural presence of Martinican soldiers who were stationed in Brazzaville. These soldiers performed music for leisure, and through this, they helped spread the biguine rhythm, which was locally known as "martiniquais". This same rhythm also became common among the Américain and showed similarities to the style used by Odéon Kinois. During this period, many Congolese orchestras adopted the biguine rhythm and adjusted it to fit local musical idioms. Antoine Kasongo began releasing music through the Olympia label in 1947, before signing with Ngoma in 1949. His collaboration with guitarist Zacharie Elenga, known as "Jimmy à la Hawaïenne" (Jimmy the Hawaiian), resulted in several influential recordings, including "Libala liboso se sukali" ("Marriage is sweet at first"), "Baloba balemba" ("we don't care about their gossip"), "Naboyaki kobina" ("I refused to dance"), "Se na mboka" ("It's in the village"), "Sebene", "Nzungu ya sika" ("New pot" or metaphorically, "new woman"), among others. Vocalists Jeanne Ninin and Caroline Mpia also played an important role in these recordings. The sebene, an instrumental bridge used to accentuate guitar improvisation, emerged prominently during this period and is largely attributed to Kasongo's innovation. Some sources, however, note that Harmonie Kinoise and Odéon Kinois were not necessarily the same group, even though they are sometimes confused. According to Nyimi Nzonga, Kasongo's group was simply referred to as Antoine Kasongo et son orchestre ("Antoine Kasongo and his orchestra") under the Ngoma label. Kasongo is described as a skilled reader of music who first trained in the brass band of the Marist Brothers' School in Kisangani. He later performed briefly with the Américain orchestra, a rival group made up of former students from the Colonial School of Boma.

By the 1950s, several local record labels, including CEFA (Compagnie d'Énregistrements Folkloriques Africains), Ngoma, Loningisa, Esengo, and Opika, began releasing 78 rpm records, which thus facilitated the genre's spread. Belgian producer Bill Alexandre, working with CEFA, introduced electric guitars to local musicians. During this period, the Kinshasa population grew exponentially, rising from 49,972 in 1940 to over 200,000 by 1950. This expansion brought increased ethnic and racial diversity, and established Kinshasa as a central hub of cultural and economic activity in the Belgian Congo. The city's urban growth was mirrored by the proliferation of leisure spaces, particularly bars and nightclubs, which became prominent sites of social interaction, musical performance, and entertainment for both migrant laborers and urban residents. These establishments played a dual role: while serving the colonial administration's agenda for pacification and social control (often referred to as the "Pax Belga"), they simultaneously provided the African population with venues for leisure, self-expression, and community-building. Bars were described as centers of style, sociability, and emerging cultural values. They were venues where people showed their style, financial status, and changing cultural values. By the mid-century, Kinshasa had more than one hundred bars, but only about twenty were officially allowed to host dancing. Prominent among these were the O.K. Bar, Macauley, Kongo Bar, Siluvangi, Quist, Zeka Bar, Amouzou, Air France, and the Home des Mulâtres. These venues were referred to as the "pride and heart of urban life", which epitomized what many saw as the height of city culture shaped by colonial-era economic change. Some bars were owned or managed by Coastmen, while others, such as the Home des Mulâtres, were racially restricted and served only mixed-race (métis) population.

=== 1950–70 ===
==== Return to maringa and integration of traditional elements ====
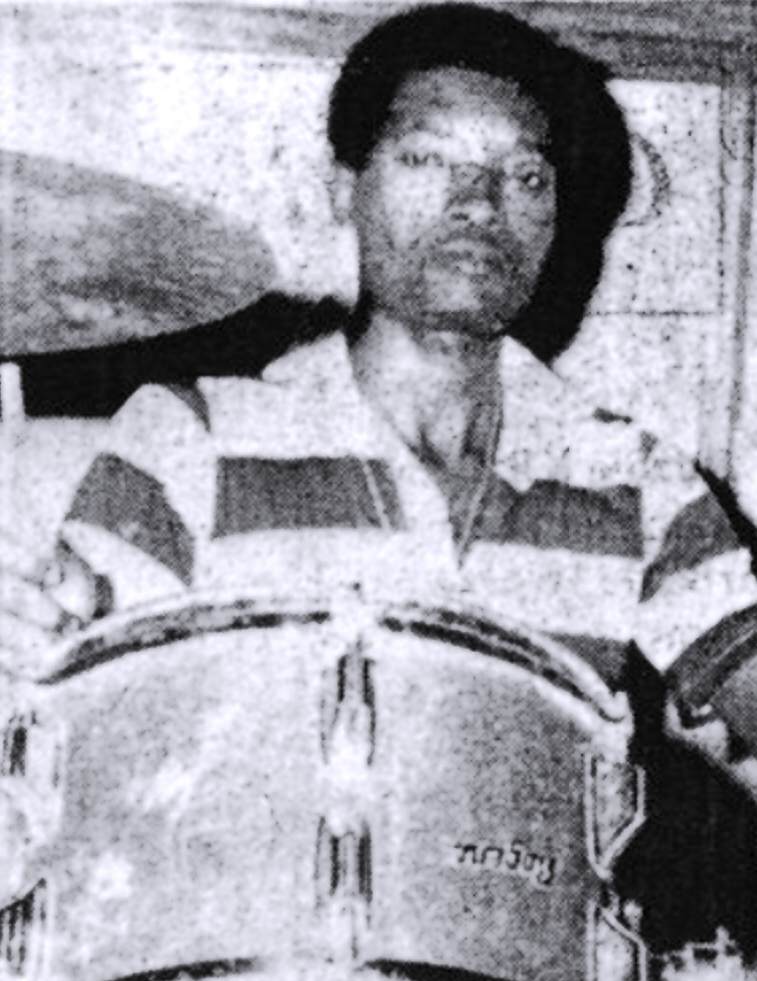
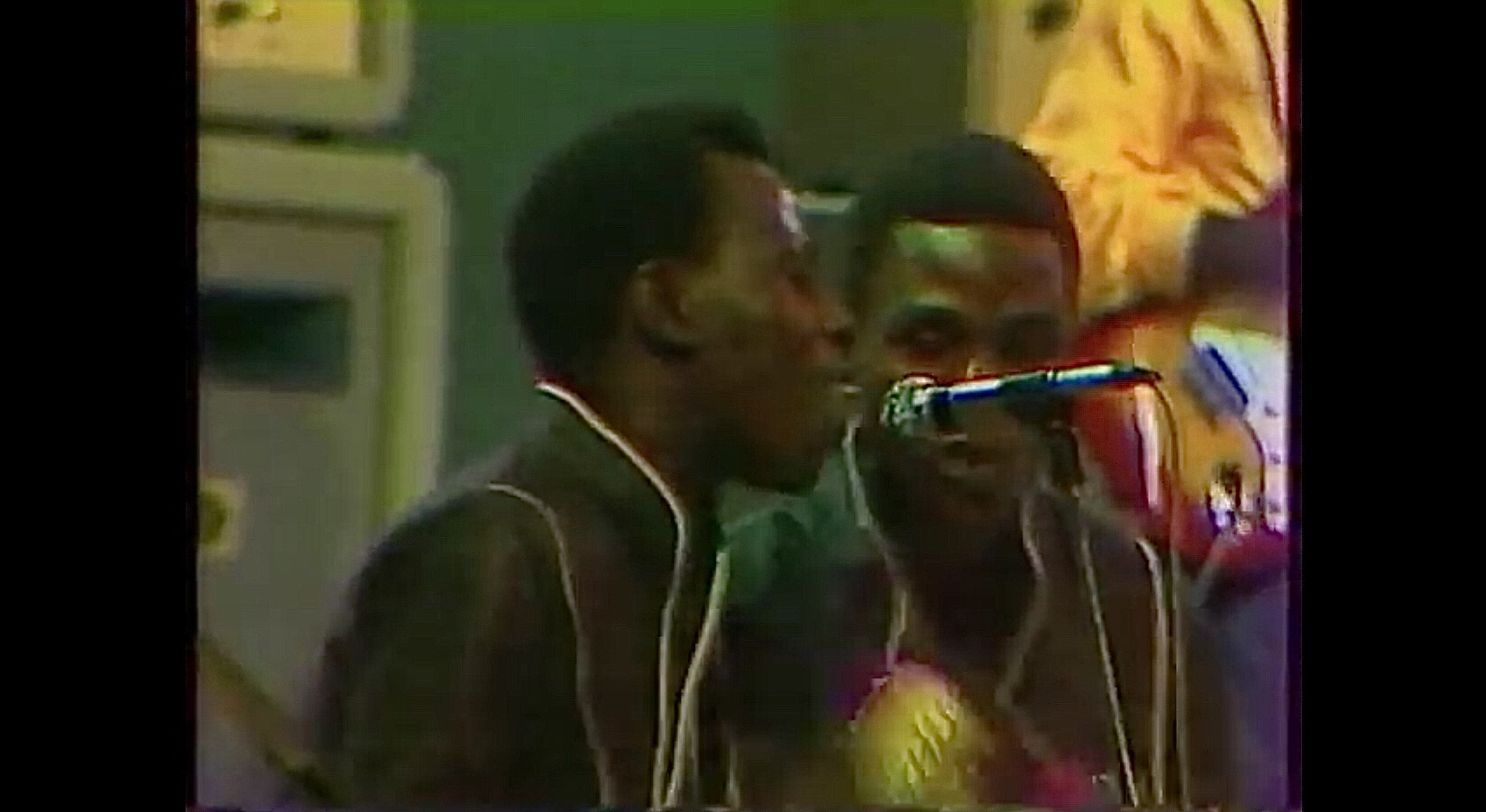
Zaïko Langa Langa pioneered a new musical direction by introducing the cavacha drumming pattern, developed by drummer Meridjo Belobi (top), and popularized the role of the atalaku, innovated by Nono Monzuluku and Bébé Atalaku (bottom).

In 1953, the Congolese music scene began to differentiate itself with the formation of African Jazz (led by Joseph "Le Grand Kallé" Kabasele), which became the first full-time orchestra dedicated to recording and performing, as well as the rise of fifteen-year-old guitarist Franco Luambo. Both would soon emerge as foundational figures in modern Congolese music. The 1950s also saw a wave of young talent, including Gérard Madiata, Jean Kwamy Munsi, Tabu Ley Rochereau, Joseph Mulamba "Mujos", and Jeannot Bombenga, Vicky Longomba, Nico Kasanda, and others. In Léopoldville, the scene was dominated by African Jazz and OK Jazz (also known as TPOK Jazz), while in Brazzaville, bands like Les Bantous de la Capitale and the Negro Band led the competition for musical prominence. Brazzaville alone hosted around ten bands, with Novelty, Cercul Jazz, Les Bantous de la Capitale, Orphée Jazz, and the Negro Band standing out. Léopoldville, likewise, was home to numerous bands, among them the leading acts African Jazz, OK Jazz, and Paul Ebengo Dewayon's Conga Jazz and Cobantou.

By the early 1960s, many imported dance and music styles had fallen out of favor and were replaced by guitar-driven music that drew more from local Congolese traditions. Ethnomusicologist Kazadi wa Mukuna notes that as the novelty of Latin American influences waned, musicians returned to maringa, which was easily adapted to modern instrumentation. This approach re-integrated traditional rhythms and dances into rumba's structure without compromising local aesthetic principles. Modern instruments expanded the harmonic and tonal range, with the guitar supplanting indigenous melodic instruments, such as the likembe and madimba, and certain European imports like the violin and accordion. During this transitional period, Congolese rumba, often still called maringa, proved highly adaptable to indigenous rhythmic frameworks. Its standard structure evolved into a multi-section format: an instrumental prelude, the principal verse (sometimes abstract in delivery), an instrumental interlude, a reprise of the verse with a modified cadence leading to the refrain (frequently a call-and-response between the lead vocalist and chorus), the sebene improvisation, and a coda derived from the refrain. This framework permitted extensive improvisation and encouraged new rhythms and melodies, which led to the creation of many new dance styles. Among the most notable were soukous (1966), kiri-kiri (1969), cavacha (1971), mokonyonyon (1977), engoss and zekete-zekete (1977 and 1983), kwassa kwassa (1986), madiaba (1988), mayebo (1990), mayeno (1991), and sundama and kintekuna (1992). These developments were strongly tied to ethnic traditions, as many new dances incorporated movements from specific ethnic groups. For example, Papa Wemba's mokonyonyon (1977) drew from the Tetela people's dances, while Lita Bembo's Ekonda saccade (1972) came from Mongo culture. The sundama, popularized by Swede-Swede, also originated from Mongo traditions. The kwasa-kwasa, created in 1986 by Kinshasa-based mechanic Jeanora and popularized by Empire Bakuba, among others, is based on the hip-and-hand movements used in the motion of shifting gears. The mayeno step of TPOK Jazz was derived from Bantandu traditions of Kongo Central. Ultimately, the evolution of Congolese rumba adhered to indigenous aesthetic norms, which affirmed Kazadi wa Mukuna's view that urban Congolese music was fundamentally rooted in maringa rather than in borrowed Latin forms. The Latin American rumba and other foreign forms introduced in the 1940s primarily served as training tools for mastering new instruments and orchestration. Once these skills were acquired, Latin forms were abandoned due to their limited adaptability to Congolese traditions. However, the term "rumba" persisted largely due to the commercial strategies of the recording industry, even as the music itself had become an entirely localized cultural expression.

==== Big bands ====
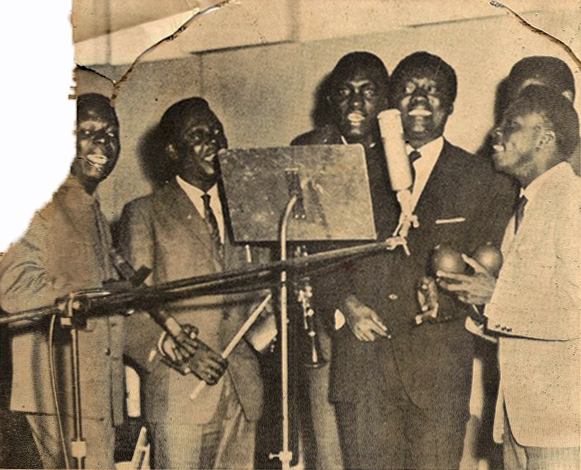
TPOK Jazz (left) and African Jazz (right) stand out as the most influential and prominent big bands in the history of Congolese popular music.

During the 1960 Round Table Conference in Brussels, which was held to decide the political future of the Belgian Congo, nationalist Thomas Kanza helped arrange for Congolese musicians to take part in official and social events. In February 1960, Le Grand Kallé and African Jazz became the first Congolese musical group and rumba band to perform in Brussels. They debuted the Congolese rumba song "Indépendance Cha Cha" at the Hôtel Plaza to mark the formal recognition of the Congo's forthcoming independence, which would be proclaimed on 30 June 1960. Sung in Lingala, the composition became an anthem for independence movements across Francophone Africa and was widely performed at public celebrations and gatherings.

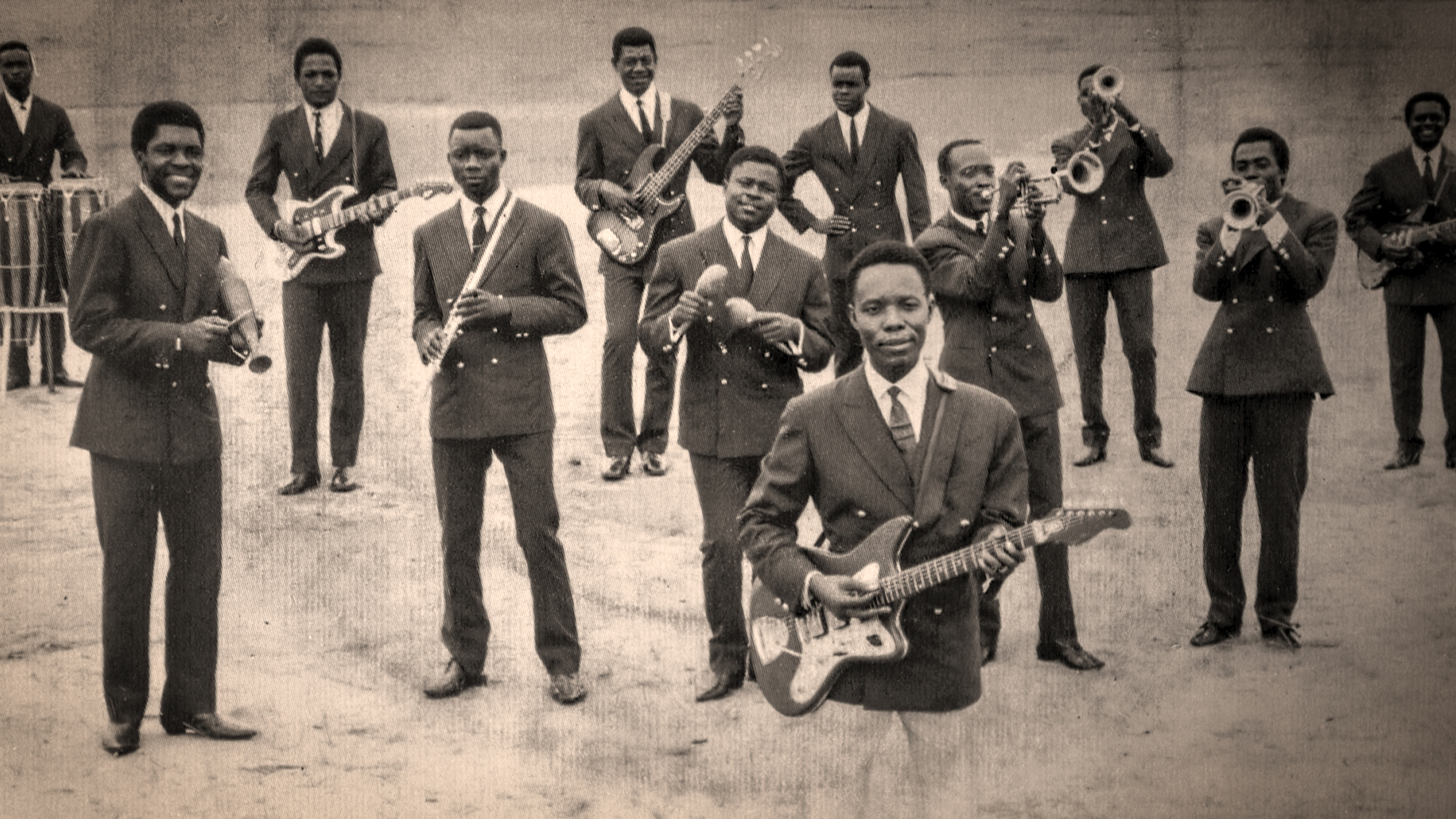
Nico Kasanda leading the Orchestre African Fiesta Sukisa.

Throughout the 1960s, African Jazz and TPOK Jazz maintained prominence in the Congolese music scene, with TPOK Jazz under Franco Luambo ultimately dominating for two decades. African Jazz experienced significant internal fractures, beginning in 1963 when its guitarist Nico Kasanda and his brother Charles Déchaud Mwamba departed following financial disputes. Although temporarily reconciled in 1961, tensions persisted. In 1963, Nico Kasanda and vocalist Tabu Ley Rochereau left the band to form African Fiesta. Their collaboration dissolved in 1965, leading Tabu Ley to rebrand the band as Orchestre African Fiesta 1966, later Orchestre African Fiesta National Le Peuple, and eventually Orchestre Afrisa International, alongside the creation of his own record label, Flash, which was sometimes called "Editions Flash", "Flash Rochereau Chante", or "Flash Edition Express Rochereau Chante". Nico Kasanda founded African Fiesta Sukisa.

Nico Kasanda was instrumental in defining the role of the electric guitar in African popular music. He helped introduce the mi-solo guitar part into Congolese rumba and influenced the later development of soukous. Unlike the two-guitar structure common in Western genres, Congolese dance music employed three guitars: rhythm, mi-solo (half-solo), and lead. The mi-solo often carried syncopated ostinatos, or guajeos, which complements the harmonic progression and freeing the lead guitar to perform elaborate melodic lines. Nico's style, characterized by fluid arpeggios, double-stops, rhythmic punctuations, and the use of tremolo and reverb, contrasted with Franco's more traditionalist approach. His work earned him the epithet L'Éternel Docteur Nico ("the Eternal Doctor Nico"), and it is reported that American guitarist Jimi Hendrix expressed a desire to meet him after hearing about his technical ability during a visit to Paris.

Despite the prestige of Orchestre Afrisa International, it could not match the sustained influence of TPOK Jazz. Rivalries between bands were common and often included attempts to attract musicians from other groups. These disputes sometimes became public, such as when Franco wrote a satirical open letter in L'Étoile du Congo. Other band leaders, including Papa Noël Nedule, who later trained musicians such as Pépé Kallé and Madilu System, also experienced similar losses of band members to rival bands. Nevertheless, these orchestras served as formative institutions for some of the most influential Congolese artists, including Franco Luambo, Sam Mangwana, Vicky Longomba, Ndombe Opetum, Dizzy Madjeku, and Verckys Kiamuangana Mateta. Sam Mangwana was especially well known for moving between several bands, including Vox Africa, Festival des Marquisards, Afrisa, TPOK Jazz, and later his own group, African All Stars. Other significant orchestras of the era included Conga Succès, Negro Succès, Tembo, Mando Negro, Super Boboto, Les Esprits, Les Fantômes, Vedette Jazz, Rico Jazz, Cobantou, Los Batchichas, Tino Mambo, Rock-a-Mambo, Diamant Bleu, Révolution, Jamel National, Festival des Maquisards, Grands Maquisards, Conga 68, Vipères Noires, Congo Jazz, Kara, Vévé, Les As, Kin Bantou, Bamboula, Thu Zaina, Los Tumba, Zembe Zembe, Is Boys, Le Mustang, Orchestre Stukas, Myosotis, Bel Guide National, Zaïko Langa Langa, Thu Saphir, and many others. Meanwhile, Mose Se Sengo of TPOK Jazz extended the reach of Congolese rumba to East Africa, particularly Kenya, after relocating there in 1974 with his band Somo Somo. Beyond Central Africa, Congolese rumba proliferated through the rest of Africa.

During the same era, students at Lycée Prince de Liège in Gombe, Kinshasa, developed a fascination with American rock and funk. From this environment emerged Los Nickelos and Thu Zahina. Los Nickelos later moved to Belgium, while Thu Zahina, though short-lived, achieved legendary status for their throbbing performances characterized by frenetic, funk-infused drumming during the sebene and an often psychedelic edge. In Belgium, Congolese students studying on academic scholarships also formed bands to entertain themselves during school breaks. These included Los Nickelos in Liège, Africana in Charleroi, Festival des Egalés in Brussels, and the Brussels-based Yéyé National and Afro Negro. From these bands emerged a new wave of Congolese singers, guitarists, and songwriters such as Zatho Kinzonzi, Félicien Nzeza, Justin Masta Nzeza, Jules Ngole Nzeza, Macole, Tony Dee Bokito, Zizi Nzanga, Maxime Mongali, Teddy Kinsala, Roger and Boul Nyimi, Sassa Puaty, Fanfan Kalala, Kelly Mubuala, Oscar Baskys Nsukami, De Kala, Jean-Pierre Kabangi, among others.

=== Zaïko and post Zaïko (c. 1970–90) ===
Stukas and Zaïko Langa Langa were the two most influential bands to emerge from this era, with the latter serving as a formative platform for prominent musicians such as Félix Manuaku Waku, Bozi Boziana, Evoloko Jocker, and Papa Wemba. During the early 1970s, a smoother and more melodious pop style was popularized by ensembles including Orchestre Bella Bella, Orchestre Shama Shama, and Lipua Lipua, while Verckys Kiamuangana Mateta promoted a raw, garage-like sound that fostered the careers of Pépé Kallé and Kanda Bongo Man.

This period coincided with significant political and cultural transformations under President Mobutu Sese Seko, and in 1971, against the backdrop of relative economic stability, growing international recognition, and the suppression of political opposition, he initiated the process of Zaireanisation (also known as authenticité). Although Zaire faced an intensifying economic crisis due to inadequate investment in infrastructure, central Kinshasa was presented as a showcase of prosperity to the international community. These efforts reflected Mobutu's emphasis on projecting an image of modernity through symbolic displays of power. Before Mobutism was codified as the official state ideology, authenticité functioned as a cultural program designed to forge a distinct national identity. Citizens were required to adopt African names, wear attire imbued with "revolutionary" symbolism, and address one another as citoyen rather than monsieur. Popular music played a central role in this project, as Mobutu reorganized the industry to align with authenticité by transferring foreign-owned recording and distribution companies to Zairean nationals, appointing Franco Luambo as his cultural envoy, and financing artists through a state-run recording agency. In return, popular music was harnessed to reinforce the regime's image. By the 1980s, musicians who had emerged from Zaïko Langa Langa dominated Kinshasa's cultural scene, founding influential bands such as Choc Stars and Viva La Musica, the latter under Papa Wemba's leadership.

==== Internationalization of soukous and the rise of ndombolo ====
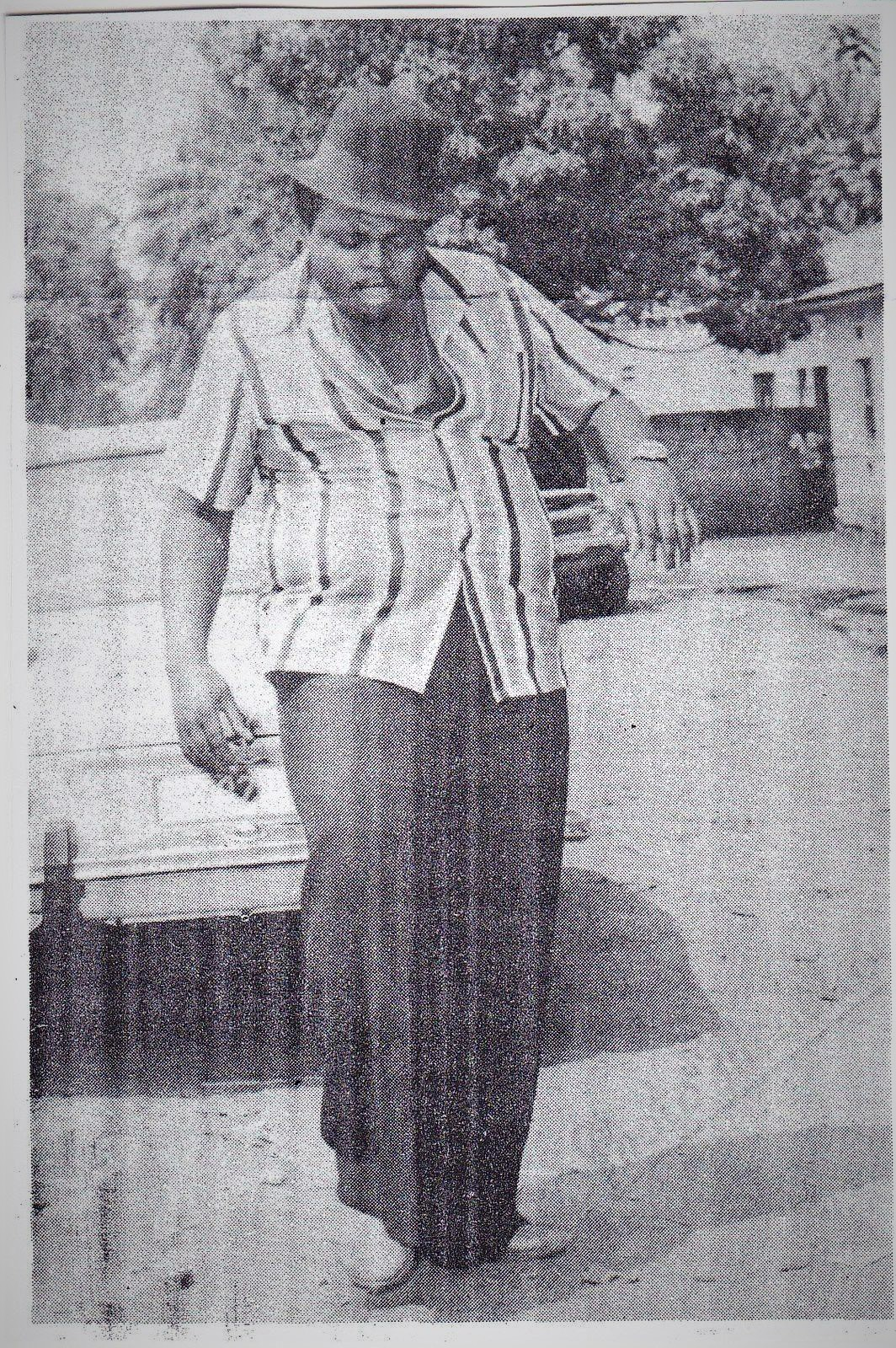
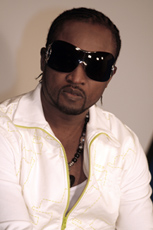
Pépé Kallé (left) was one of the leading figures in soukous, while Werrason (right) rose to prominence in ndombolo.

During the 1980s, mounting sociopolitical upheaval in Zaire prompted many musicians to relocate abroad. Tanzania, Kenya, Uganda, and Colombia served as temporary refuges, while Paris, Brussels, and London developed into major centers for Congolese music. Paris, in particular, became a hub for soukous, where Congolese musicians engaged with European and Caribbean influences, synthesizers, and modern production techniques. Soukous in this period garnered a wide global following, with leading figures such as Papa Wemba, Pépé Kallé, Kanda Bongo Man, and Rigo Star achieving acclaim across Europe, Africa, and the Caribbean. Papa Wemba also became closely associated with the La Sape movement, a cultural phenomenon defined by flamboyant displays of luxury fashion. Meanwhile, Kinshasa continued to produce notable musicians such as Bimi Ombale and Dindo Yogo. The diversification of genres included the rise of madiaba and the popularization of Tshala Mwana's mutuashi, rooted in Luba tradition. In 1985, Franco and TPOK Jazz released Mario, an album steeped in Congolese rumba; its title track became an immediate hit, selling over 200,000 copies in Zaire and earning gold certification. Zaïko Langa Langa also cemented its international reputation by appearing on French national television (TF1) in 1987 and securing second place in the Référendum RFI Canal Tropical, behind the Antillean band Kassav'.

From the late 1980s onward, successive generations of musicians continued to redefine Congolese popular music. Among Viva La Musica's protégés, Koffi Olomide emerged as the most influential figure of the early 1990s. His main rivals were J.B. Mpiana and Werrason, both veterans of Wenge Musica, a band that played a pivotal role in developing ndombolo. Characterized by rapid guitar lines, synthesizer-driven arrangements, energetic percussion, and the interplay of atalaku chants with melodic vocals, ndombolo dominated Congolese music throughout the 1990s and 2000s. Even Koffi's later repertoire increasingly centered on ndombolo compositions.

Following the collapse of international cultural cooperation in the post-Zaire years, new artistic spaces began to appear. Musicians responded to these shifts by creating independent structures that allowed them to keep producing music, share resources, and maintain visibility. Existing associations expanded their missions, and became essential components of Kinshasa's performing arts. Operating mainly as nonprofit organizations, these groups received no state funding and instead relied on private contributions, partnerships with foreign cultural institutions, or limited international assistance. Creative activity typically took place in shared spaces that doubled as administrative offices and rehearsal studios. Each band maintained its own practice venue, where musicians honed new compositions, hosted public paid rehearsals, and developed choreographic ideas.

=== Hip-hop ===
Kinshasa became a center for Congolese hip-hop through changes in culture, politics, and youth culture. In the late 1980s and 1990s, the city's music scene was mostly dominated by "musique typique", a popular style led by Koffi Olomidé, Werrason, and JB Mpiana. Even so, a new group of young artists began to develop hip-hop in the 1990s. The origins of Congolese hip-hop can be traced to the years of Mobutu Sese Seko's rule when political instability and growing disillusionment among youth created interest in new forms of cultural expression. Some middle- and upper-class teenagers in Kinshasa, who had access to American and French rap through satellite TV and recordings from abroad, began emulating the style and performing it at school events and private parties. After the fall of Mobutu in 1997 during the First Congo War, the media sector underwent liberalization, which led to the growth of private radio and television stations, which gave local rap artists an unprecedented opportunity to be broadcast.

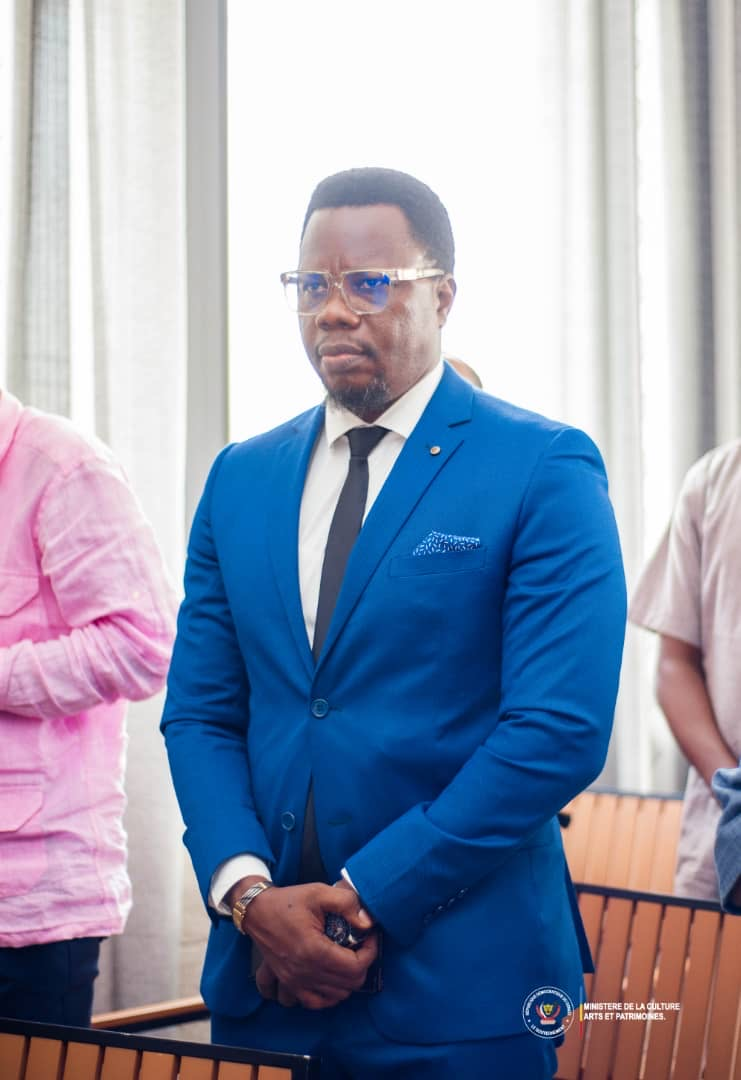
Alex Dende, known professionally as Lexxus Legal, is a prominent figure in Congolese hip-hop and a co-founder of the group Pensée Brute Noire (PBN), recognized for pioneering a combative and protest-oriented style of rap in the Democratic Republic of the Congo.

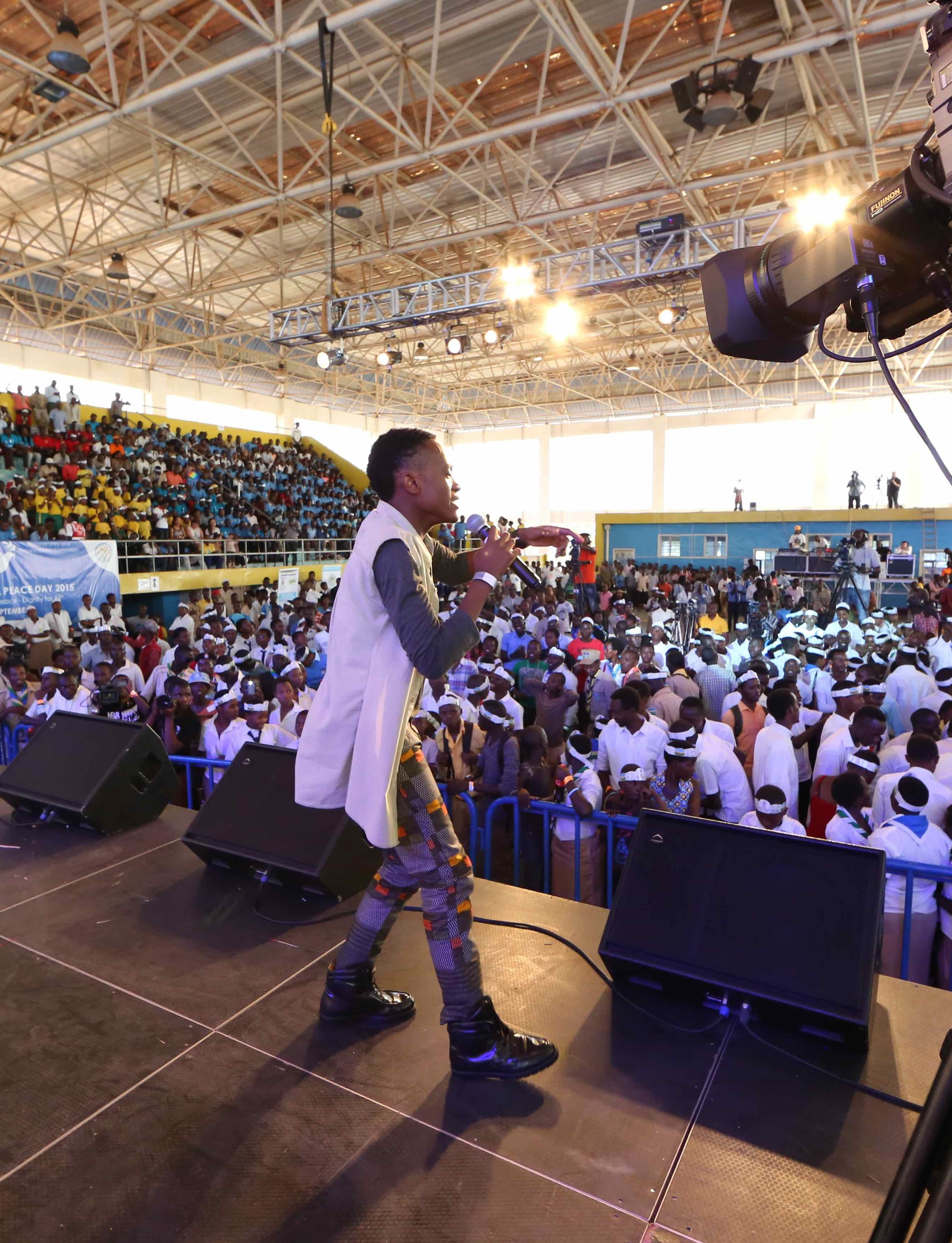
Innoss'B, born and raised in Goma, North Kivu Province, is known for blending traditional Congolese rhythms with contemporary hip-hop and R&B.

Between 1997 and 2001, early rap groups such as Bawuta-Kin, PNB (Pensée Nègre Brute), Section Bantoue, and Smoke appeared in Kinshasa. These groups often produced music with very limited resources. They recorded in home studios, pooled money to shoot music videos, and paid television hosts for ephemeral airplay slots. At first, hip-hop faced resistance in a music culture that focused mainly on dance, rhythm, and light themes. Hip-hop, by contrast, often included direct social and political messages, and because of this, some saw rap artists as outsiders and called them empêcheurs d'ambiancer en rond ("people who spoil the fun"). Even without strong financial support, especially after many producers left during the unrest of the early 1990s, the hip-hop scene continued to grow, with some artists performing in public venues such as La Halle de la Gombe, which offered better performance conditions. At the same time, hip-hop spread from wealthier quartiers into working-class areas like Ndjili, the Yolo quartier of Kalamu, and Kabambaré Territory in Maniema Province, with youth incorporating Lingala, French, Kikongo, Swahili, and other local languages into their lyrics.

Some groups, including Bawuta-Kin and PNB, also sampled music from Franco Luambo, Koffi, and Tshala Muana, which helped create a sound that connected older musical traditions with the new hip-hop style. The growing acceptance of the genre was shown in December 2003, when about 60,000 people attended a major hip-hop concert at the Stade des Martyrs. Although still facing limited funding and support, Kinshasa's hip-hop artists had built a strong local scene. One of the movement's most influential figures was Lexxus Legal, who was a co-founding member of PNB and became known for his politically-centered lyrics. Many critics describe him as the "icon of Congolese hip hop" and one of the key voices in African rap. Goma-born rapper Innoss'B gained attention across Africa with his 2017 song "Ozo Beta Mabe" and later became the first Congolese artist to surpass 100 million YouTube views with the remix of "Yo Pe", featuring Tanzanian singer Diamond Platnumz. Kinshasa rapper Gaz Fabilouss also became well known after releasing his 2018 EP Jeune courageux, which included hits such as "Aye" (featuring Koffi), "Salaire", and "Love Story". The Kisangani-born rapper Alesh is also noted for his sharp social and political commentary, often presented with humor. The duo MPR (Musique Populaire de la Révolution), composed of Zozo Machine and Yuma, embraces a nostalgic aesthetic drawn from Mobutu-era symbolism. Their 2019 hit "Dollars" catalyzed widespread recognition, followed in 2020 by their inclusion in the rap collective Cité Zaïre, whose freestyle "Éternel Courageux" exhorted Congolese youth toward self-determination and industriousness. MPR's 2021 mixtape Première leçon, which includes the hit “"Nini to sali té" garnered acclaim for criticizing post-independence governance in the DRC, and the music video was banned nationwide by the National Commission for the Censorship of Songs and Performances for violating procedural regulations, including failure to seek prior approval, a common tactic used to restrict politically sensitive content. Kinshasa-based rapper Bob Elvis also rose to fame through politically conscious compositions that confront institutional hypocrisy.

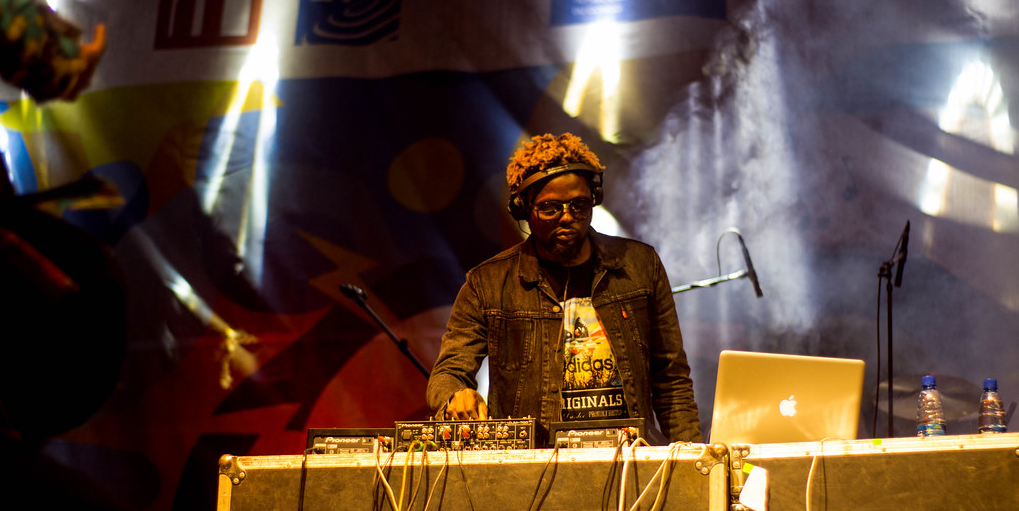
DJ Spilulu performing live at the Amani Festival.

Despite limited female representation in the Congolese hip-hop scene, Sista Becky has emerged as a trailblazer after debuting her single "Mr le Rap" in 2017, which was followed by "Flip Flop", "Notorious Spirit", and "Emotions", that established herself as the leading female voice in a male-dominated space. In 2023, Kolwezi-born RJ Kanierra experienced rapid success with his single "Tia", which amassed over two million YouTube views in just two weeks and topped charts on various platforms, including Boomplay and Shazam. Other Congolese rappers include Marshall Dixon, NMB La Panthère, Lyke Mike, Herléo Muntu, K-Melia, Negue Fly Nsau, Celeo Scram, and Spilulu.

== Politics in popular music ==
=== Early political engagement (1965–1970) ===
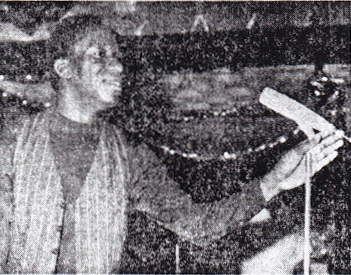
Tabu Ley Rochereau performing at the Olympia Hall in 1970

Congolese musicians have often acted as chroniclers and promoters of political developments. The military coup of 24 November 1965, which brought Mobutu Sese Seko to power, happened at a time when the Congolese political class was still in its formative stage. In the aftermath, the public seeking stability and peace generally welcomed the new regime, which had promised to return power to civilian authorities within five years, a pledge that was never fulfilled. In the first decade of Mobutu's rule, music became a medium through which the regime's political and socio-economic objectives were communicated. Themes in popular songs included nationalism, pan-Africanism, political programs, and notable political events. Early examples include Franco Luambo and TPOK Jazz's "Contentieux Belgo-Congolais enterré" ("Belgian-Congolese Dispute Buried", 1967) and Jean Munsi Kwamy with Orchestre Révolution's "Ndimbala ya Zaïre" ("Explanation of the Zaïre Currency", 1967). Tabu Ley Rochereau contributed several works, including "Cinq ans" ("Five Years", 1965) with African Fiesta, "Objectif 80" (1966) with African Fiesta 66, and "Révolution comparaison" (1968) with Orchestre Afrisa International. Other notable songs from the era include Lasse and Orchestre Los Angel's "Retroussons les manches" ("Let's Roll Up Our Sleeves", 1966) and Jeannot Bombenga's 1967 "Mbula ya sacrifices" ("1967 Year of Sacrifices", 1967).

While this alignment with state narratives afforded musicians increased visibility, it also drew criticism from the public and the national press, who accused certain artists of partisan opportunism. Nevertheless, Congolese popular music established a distinctive political voice, portraying national leaders to the public, celebrating their achievements, and promoting state policies. Notable examples included Joseph Mwena and African Fiesta National's "Lumumba libérateur" (1967), Bikasi Mandeko and Orchestre Saka Saka's "Mobutu médiateur" (1968), Tabu Ley Rochereau and Afrisa International's "Martin Luther King" (1968), and Tabu Ley Rochereau and L'Orchestre African Fiesta National Le Peuple's "Kashama Nkoy" (1969).

==== Political figures, the cult of personality, political animation, and propaganda ====
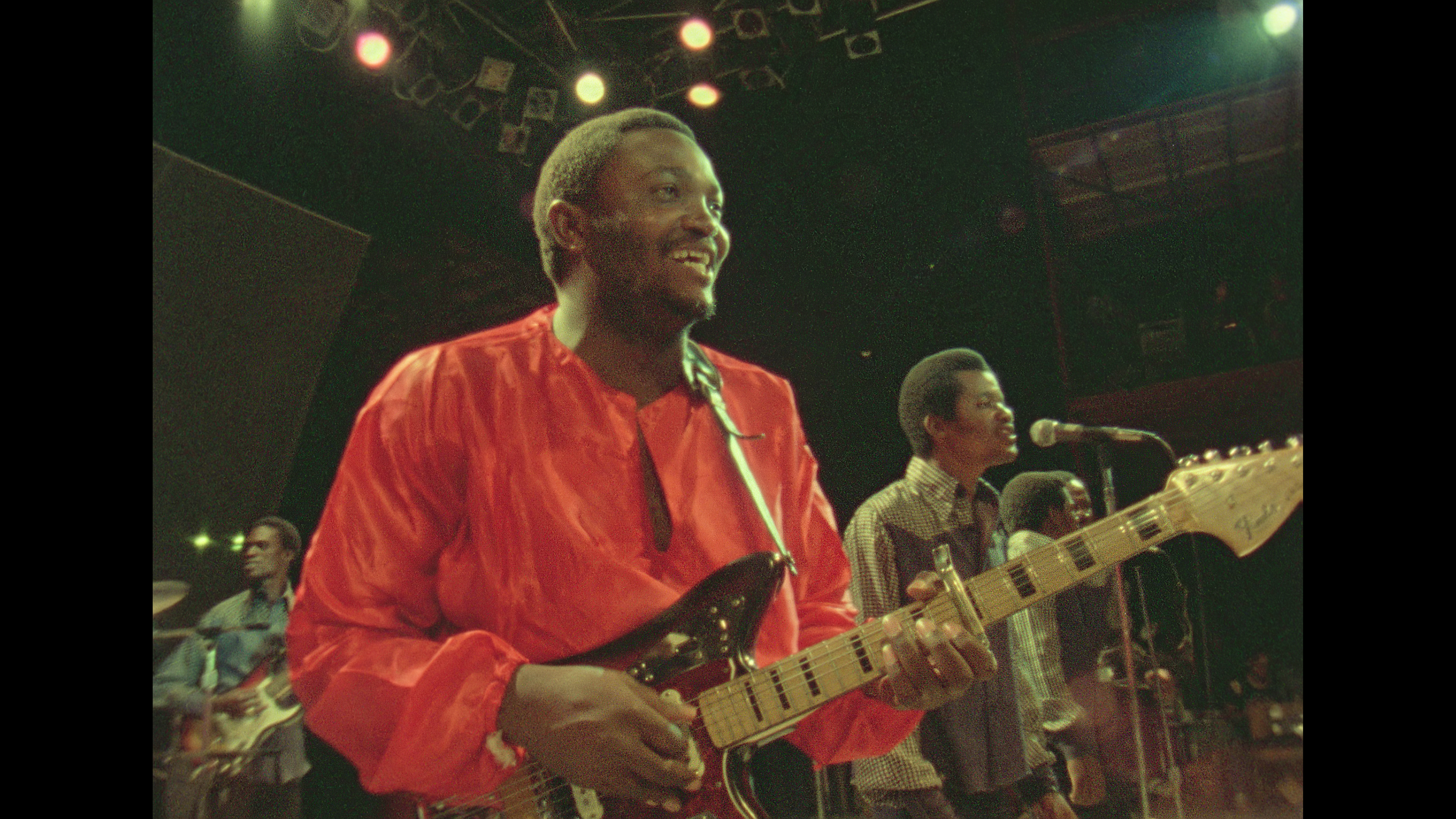
Franco performing with TPOK Jazz at Zaire 74.

Throughout the 1970s, musical references to political figures became increasingly tied to electoral campaigns or commemorations of state events and notable examples from this period including Franco and TPOK Jazz's "Mwaku elombe ya Kwango" (1970), "Président Eyadema" (1975), "Votez Litho Moboti au Bureau Politique" (1977), and "Votez Bomboko au Bureau Politique" (1977). By the latter part of the decade, these references largely concentrated on the person of the President.

Following the establishment of the Popular Movement of the Revolution (Mouvement Populaire de la Révolution, MPR) in 1967, music became an instrument for reinforcing the one-party state's ideology and for mythologizing Mobutu. Nationalist ideals gradually ceded to political opportunism and, in some cases, uncritical glorification. Mobutu was extolled through grandiose epithets such as "father", "guide", "messenger of God", "leopard", "sun", and "prophet". Songs emblematic of this period included Bombenga and Orchestre Vox Africa's "C.V.R." ("Corps des Volontaires de la République", 1966), Joseph "Mujos" Mulamba and Orchestre Révolution's "M.P.R." (1967), Paul Ebengo Dewayon and Orchestre Cobantou's "M.P.R." (1967), Jojo and Orchestre Dombes' "M.P.R. ekobenga banso" ("M.P.R. Calls Everyone", 1967), Sam Mangwana and Orchestre Festival des Maquisards' "Congo ya M.P.R." ("Congo Goes with M.P.R.", 1967), Franco and TPOK Jazz's "Votez vert" ("Vote for You", 1970), and Franco and TPOK Jazz's "Candidat na biso Mobutu" ("Mobutu is My Candidate", 1984).

In 1973, the regime institutionalized the concept of "political animation songs", blending popular, folk, and modern dance styles into compositions that celebrated the President and promoted the tenets of Mobutism. The First National Political and Cultural Festival (Premier Festival National Politique et Culturel) brought together political animation groups from all provinces. This initiative led to the creation of the Ministry of Mobilization, Propaganda, and Political Animation (Mobilisation, Propagande et Animation Politique; MOPAP), institutionalizing musical propaganda. Political animation eventually permeated even religious music, exemplified by the work of Father Imana Botumbi. Despite state control, some musicians returned to the traditional role of the artist: to educate, raise moral awareness, and, at times, voice dissent. When criticism was too overt, the state censorship apparatus responded with severity. For example, Franco's alleged "Cravate nationale" ("National Tie"), reportedly inspired by the 1966 execution of the "Pentecost martyrs", was never released and resulted in state security intervention. To evade censorship, musicians often employed allegory, metaphor, and riddles, allowing audiences to decode political messages through "popular rumor". Works exemplifying this approach include Tabu Ley Rochereau and African Fiesta National Le Peuple's "Mokolo Nakokufa" (1966), Roy Innocent and Orchestre Cobantou's "Nyama ya Zamba" (1968), Tabu Ley Rochereau and African Fiesta National Le Peuple's "Kashama Nkoy" (1969), Franco and TPOK Jazz's "Lettre à M. D.G." (1987), and Franco and TPOK Jazz's "Tailleur" (1987).

=== The democratic transition ===
The democratic transition in Zaire was formally initiated on 24 April 1990, which marked the official end of the one-party state. The shift from a single-party system to what was often described as "excessive multipartyism", combined with a partial relaxation of the state's stringent censorship on free expression, produced a proliferation of political leaders, reminiscent of the First Republic, and a multitude of party founder-presidents. This rapid political diversification, however, generated widespread confusion among the populace, politicians, and musicians. Political developments occurred at a relentless pace, involving a series of round tables, the Sovereign National Conference (Conférence nationale souveraine), and multiple agreements, most of which were violated shortly after their signing. Musicians often struggled to process these events or to respond in a manner with enduring artistic and political impact. Questions emerged over what subjects to address, and for whom the messages should be intended, with the risk of public ridicule looming over overtly political works. An example of this was Simaro Lutumba and TPOK Jazz's "Banque Centrale" (1994), intended to promote public understanding of monetary reform and encourage civic responsibility. Released on 1 January 1994, the song was rendered politically obsolete within days, as the government acknowledged the reform's failure (a fact confirmed by the President himself in a speech on 4 January).

During the Sovereign National Conference, specially commissioned songs were broadcast on television and radio as introductory themes to news segments. However, these works were short-lived, quickly replaced as political circumstances shifted. The song "La réconciliation" (1992) by Madilu System and Deneewade became emblematic of the "catastrophic" conclusion of the conference. The final decade of the Second Republic offered little social relief to Congolese citizens, and musicians, still reeling from two decades of creative repression, often appeared disengaged from political commentary. Many artists had gone into exile and their contribution during the democratization process was "negative across the board". Unlike earlier generations (represented by Adou Elenga, Le Grand Kallé, and Paul Lomami-Tshibamba) whose works had seized political milestones, the democratization period left little in the way of a musical record for posterity. One notable exception was Tabu Ley Rochereau's "Le Glas a sonné" (1993), produced in exile, which addressed the political situation directly. Yet such cases were rare, and many established artists remained silent, whether out of fear of reprisals, disillusionment, or lack of inspiration.

With the dismantling of the one-party propaganda apparatus, political songs disappeared from the airwaves, and the slogans and melodies once imposed on the public were quickly forgotten. In their place, religious choirs flourished. Religious music, which had entered the realm of political animation under Father Imana Botumbi, reclaimed its spiritual mission during the democratic transition. Figures such as Father Makamba Ma Mazinga produced widely circulated works, including "Popopo" (1993), "Non violence", and "Kanda Mopaya" ("Anger is fleeting"), which struck a chord throughout Kinshasa and beyond, aiming to promote moral and social consciousness by commemorating the looting and the martyrs of the Christian marches on 2 and 16 February 1992, events that had largely faded from public memory. Among the most memorable religious compositions of the era was "Ata Ndele" (1993) by the group Bana Mbila, which, in the face of political selfishness and public suffering, expressed a message of hope, saying that there is hope in tomorrow and that one day everything will change and misery will come to an end.

=== Laurent-Désiré Kabila era ===
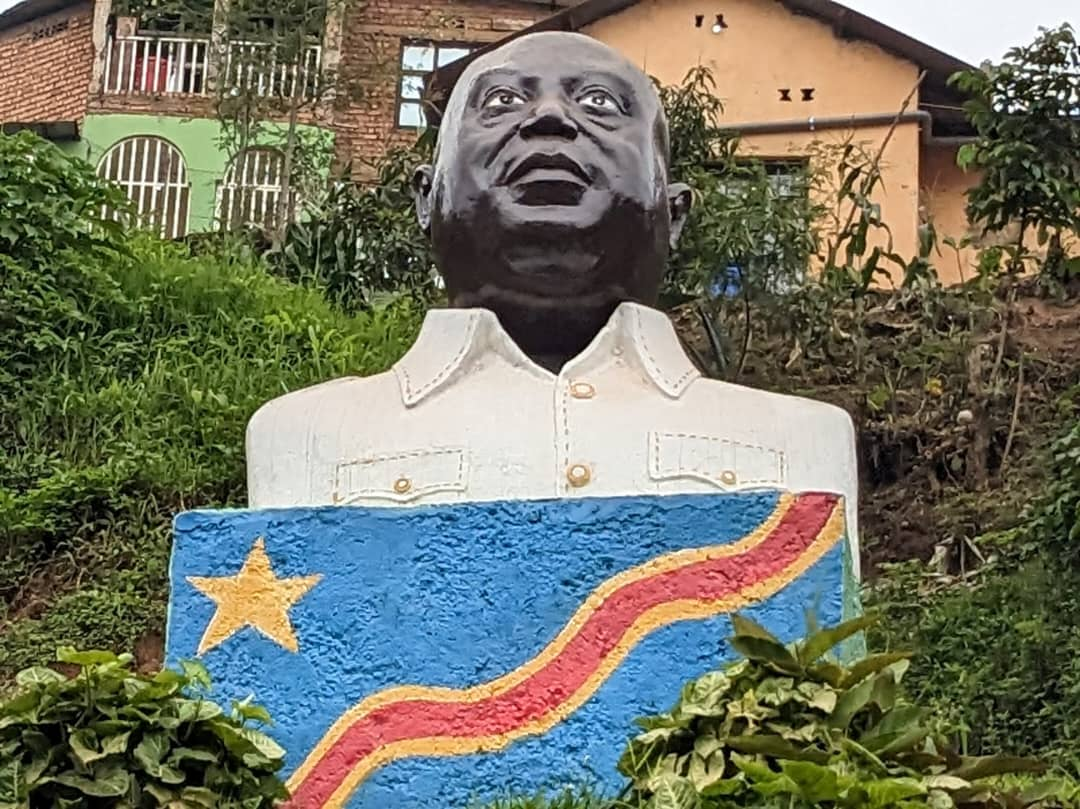
The monument honoring Laurent-Désiré Kabila in Bukavu, South Kivu

More than three decades later, Laurent-Désiré Kabila's rise to power through the Alliance of Democratic Forces for the Liberation of Congo (AFDL) in May 1997, a rebel movement supported by Rwandan, Ugandan, Angolan, and other regional allies, marked a revival of the politicization of music as the group presented itself as a force for liberation from the remnants of Mobutu's single-party state. But after Kabila's inauguration on 29 May 1997, the regime adopted many of the same propaganda techniques once used by Mobutu. News bulletins on the Radio-Télévision nationale congolaise (RTNC) opened with "revolutionary songs" glorifying the AFDL and its leader, as the practice of "political animation" aimed at elevating the head of state to near-divine status was revived. Among the leading figures in this cultural movement was Tshala Muana, who composed "Hymne aux libérateurs" ("hymn to the liberators") in praise of Kabila's victory. Having returned from France to Kinshasa, she became one of the most visible musical ambassadors of the new government, touring the provinces alongside Wenge Musica members Didier Masela, Werrason, and Adolphe Dominguez, as well as actors Mister Siatula and Maman Bipendu (born Esther Bipendu Mutebua). Other musicians followed suit. West Ghenda, younger brother of the Minister of Information and Cultural Affairs Raphaël Ghenda, and Kalanga Muana Zaïre, who had previously dedicated "Elombe Sese" to Mobutu, reinvented himself as Muana Congo ("child of Congo") and denounced the former regime through performances in Christian assemblies. Kalama Soul, creator of the musical comedy Naza ballado te ("I'm not a wanderer"), also released a patriotic song supporting the AFDL.

In March 1998, Papa Wemba brought together about twenty musicians from Kinshasa, Paris, and Brussels to record "Muana Mpwo", also known as "Franc Congolais" ("Congolese franc"), which commemorated the introduction of the new national currency. When the Central Bank officially launched the Congolese franc on 30 June, the song was broadcast nine times a day on state television as part of a nationwide propaganda campaign. But the optimism was short-lived, as the currency quickly lost value due to economic mismanagement. That same day, the Ministry of Information and Cultural Affairs held a "Best Patriotic Song Contest", which attracted over 89 entries. The first prize went to West Ghenda's "Uhuru", which earned him $10,000; the second to Christian Ngoy's "Bâtissons le Congo" ("let's build the Congo"), worth $7,000; and the third to Tshala Muana's "Hymne aux libérateurs". During the award ceremony, Laurent-Désiré Kabila declared that,

"In the absence of efficient communication tools, we recognize that our musicians have the ability to reach even the most remote layers of our population".

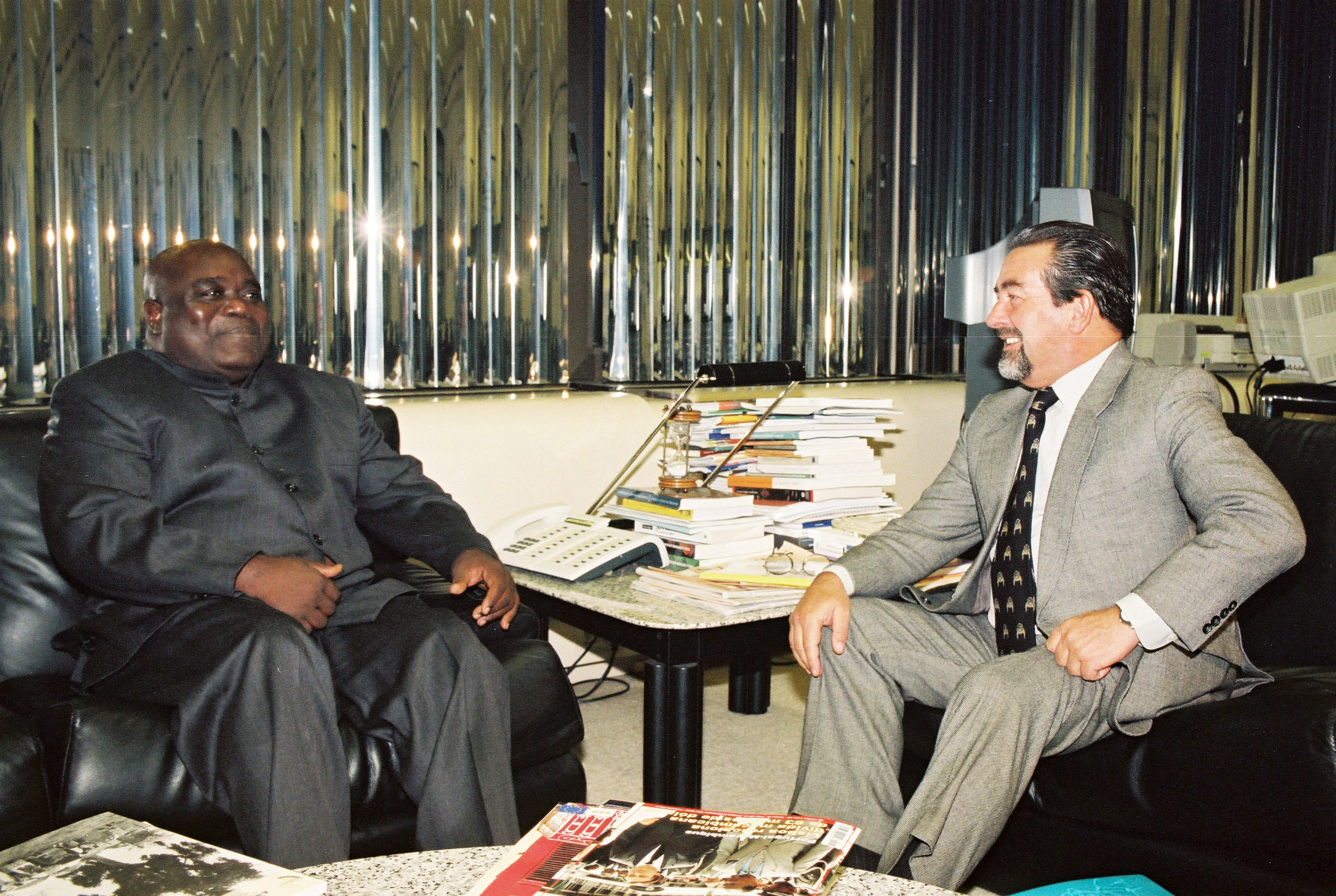
Visit of President Laurent-Désiré Kabila to João de Deus Pinheiro, the European Commissioner for Relations with Parliament, Culture, and Audiovisual, to discuss the armed conflict raging in the country, November 1998.

Kabila's ascent also brought a wave of speculation and rumor within Kinshasa's cultural scene, including fears of bans on miniskirts, women's trousers, love songs, and nightclubs. By 1998, the newspaper Libération reported a noticeable decline in the number of soukous orchestras and the imposition of strict regulations on nightlife. Only a few venues, such as Le Circus, Le Séguin, Le Gin Fizz, L'Imprévu, L'Atmosphère, Le Savanana, and Le M16, remained open to the public.

When Rwandan and Ugandan forces, Kabila's former allies, invaded eastern Congo in August 1998, he once again turned to musicians to bolster national unity. Souzy Kasseya composed "Tokufa po na Congo" ("we die for Congo"), a patriotic anthem performed by a collective of artists under Kabila's direction. During a diplomatic meeting in Windhoek, Kabila even invited American singer-songwriter Michael Jackson to perform in Kinshasa in support of the "revolution", though the concert never materialized. Between 1998 and 2003, as the Second Congo War devastated the country, few Congolese musicians addressed the conflict in their works. Despite producing albums with upwards of a dozen tracks, artists largely avoided themes of war, insecurity, and political critique. As noted by music journalist Jeannot Ne Nzau Diop, they largely overlooked United Nations reports detailing massacres, repeated rebellions, and a humanitarian crisis that claimed approximately six million lives and led to the plundering of mineral-rich regions like Ituri, Kivu, and Katanga.

== Religious music ==
=== Origins and early developments ===
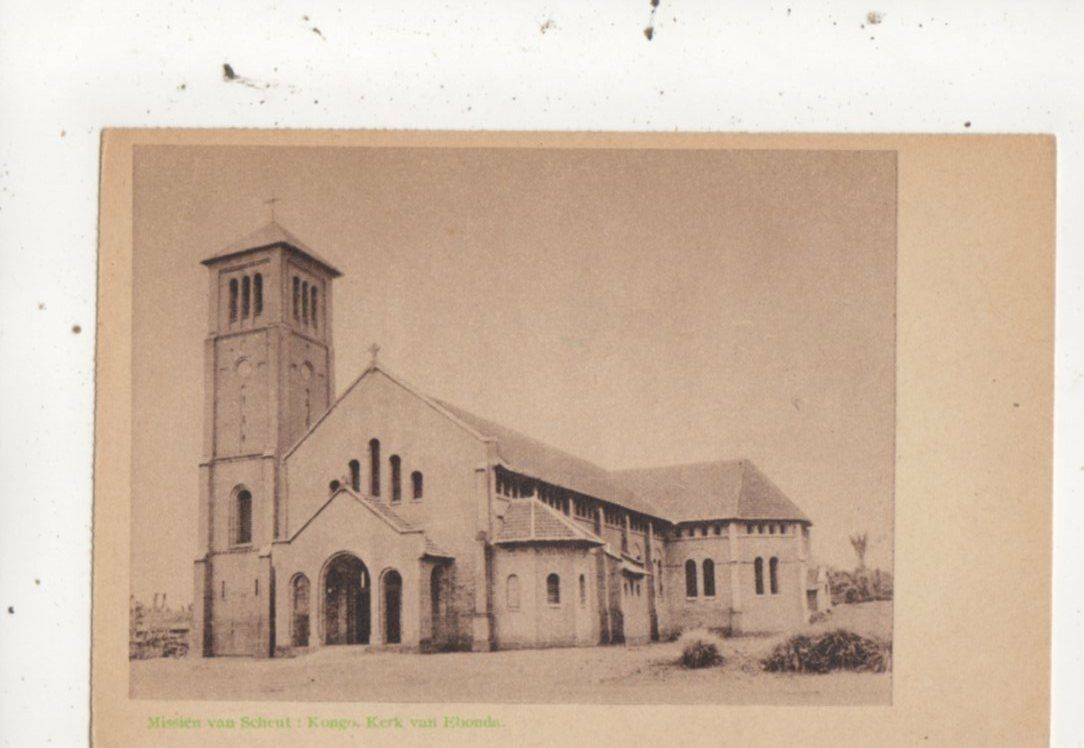
Ebonda Church of the Scheutist Fathers' mission in the 1920s in Bumba Territory, Mongala Province.

Religious music is anchored in the cultural, social, and spiritual identity of the country. Historically confined to church settings, it gradually expanded into public life and became a significant force in shaping religious practice and popular culture. Its evolution mirrors the evolution of Congolese society, where spirituality permeates artistic expression and secular traditions borrow freely from the sacred.

The earliest forms of Congolese religious music developed through church choirs and brass bands associated with Catholic, Protestant, Kimbanguist, and Salvation Army congregations, which served as training grounds for successive generations of performers. In its initial phase, sacred music was predominantly restricted to liturgical contexts, with hymns of praise performed during worship services or within mourning households, where they conveyed solemnity and consolation. During the colonial period, significant institutional efforts shaped the early history of Congolese liturgical song. In the 1940s, Benedictine father Dom Anschaire Lamoral founded the choir Petits Chanteurs de la Croix de Cuivre (Little Singers of the Copper Cross) in Katanga, mentoring Joseph Kiwele, who composed the "Missa Katanga", notable for its integration of drums and traditional instruments into Catholic worship. Similarly, Father Joseph Malula (later elevated to Cardinal) championed the incorporation of local musical forms into Catholic liturgy, culminating in the creation of the Zairean Rite in 1973. This liturgical reform codified the integration of local rhythms and instruments into Roman Catholic rituals.

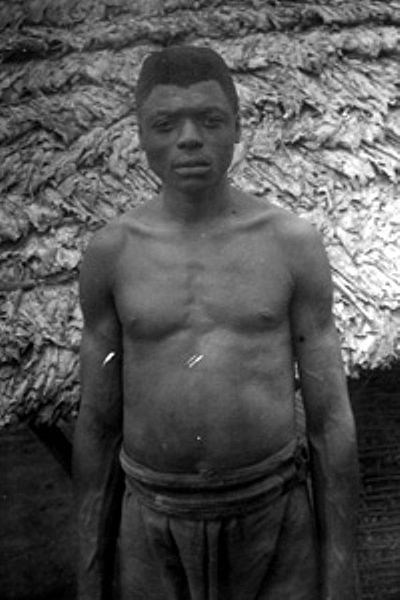
Simon Kimbangu was a Congolese religious leader and prophet who founded the Kimbanguist Church, one of the most influential African-initiated churches.

The Salvation Army likewise played an important role through groups such as the orchestra Les Vagabonds du Ciel and choir Les Amis du Ciel, which were instrumental in training Christian musicians in Middle Congo. Across the Congo River in Brazzaville, Father Charles Lacompte founded the Petits Chanteurs de la Croix d'Ébène (Little Singers of the Ebony Cross) in 1949, later renamed the Chorale des Piroguiers (Boatmen's Choir). This ensemble delivered a landmark performance of "La Messe des Piroguiers" by Eliane Barrat Peppert, broadcast live on Radio-Brazzaville, marking a pivotal moment when African percussive instruments, specifically the drum of the Banda boatmen of Ubangi-Shari (today's Central African Republic), were formally introduced into liturgical music. The performance took place during the consecration of the Basilica of Sainte-Anne by Bishop Paul Biéchy, attended by high-ranking ecclesiastical figures and colonial administrators. Additional choirs such as the Chœur Saint François d'Assise du Plateau in Brazzaville's Bacongo arrondissement emerged during the 1940s.

=== Sacred–secular overlap and the rise of revivalist Christian music ===
The boundary between religious and secular music in the DRC has historically been porous. Many leading figures in Congolese popular music, such as Le Grand Kallé, Célestin "Célio" Kouka, Vicky Longomba, Sammy Trompette, Verckys Kiamuangana Mateta, José Dilu Dilumona, Jossart N'Yoka Longo, Pépé Kallé, Papa Wemba, D. V. Moanda, among others, began as choristers or cantors in church choirs before transitioning to secular performance. Likewise, secular songs often contained spiritual themes. A notable example is François Bosele's "Liwa Liponi Tata" (released in the early 1950s), which, although secular in intent, gained widespread acceptance in religious settings due to its evocative spiritual imagery. Throughout the 1960s and 1970s, this duality persisted, as figures such as Archbishop Barthélemy Batantu ("Nkundi"), Ntesa Dalienst ("Tokosenga Na Nzambe", 1971), and Verckys ("Nakomitunaka", 1972) produced works that invoked divine themes. The 1970s also saw the emergence of groups such as Les Perles (later Palata), who drew inspiration from American gospel, and orchestras like Le Peuple, which performed religiously inspired works in secular styles.

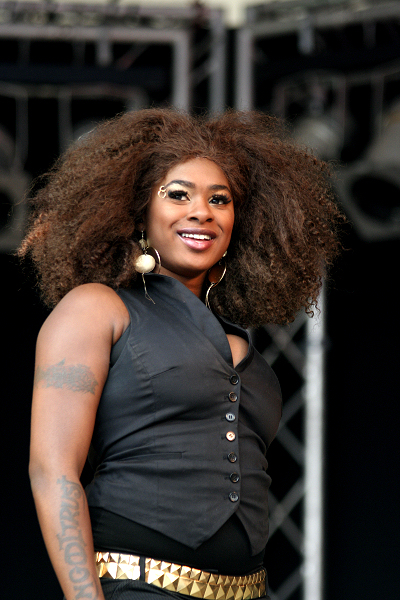
Nathalie Makoma, lead vocalist of Makoma, a family-based Christian music group recognized as one of Africa's most influential gospel groups and widely celebrated within the African diaspora.

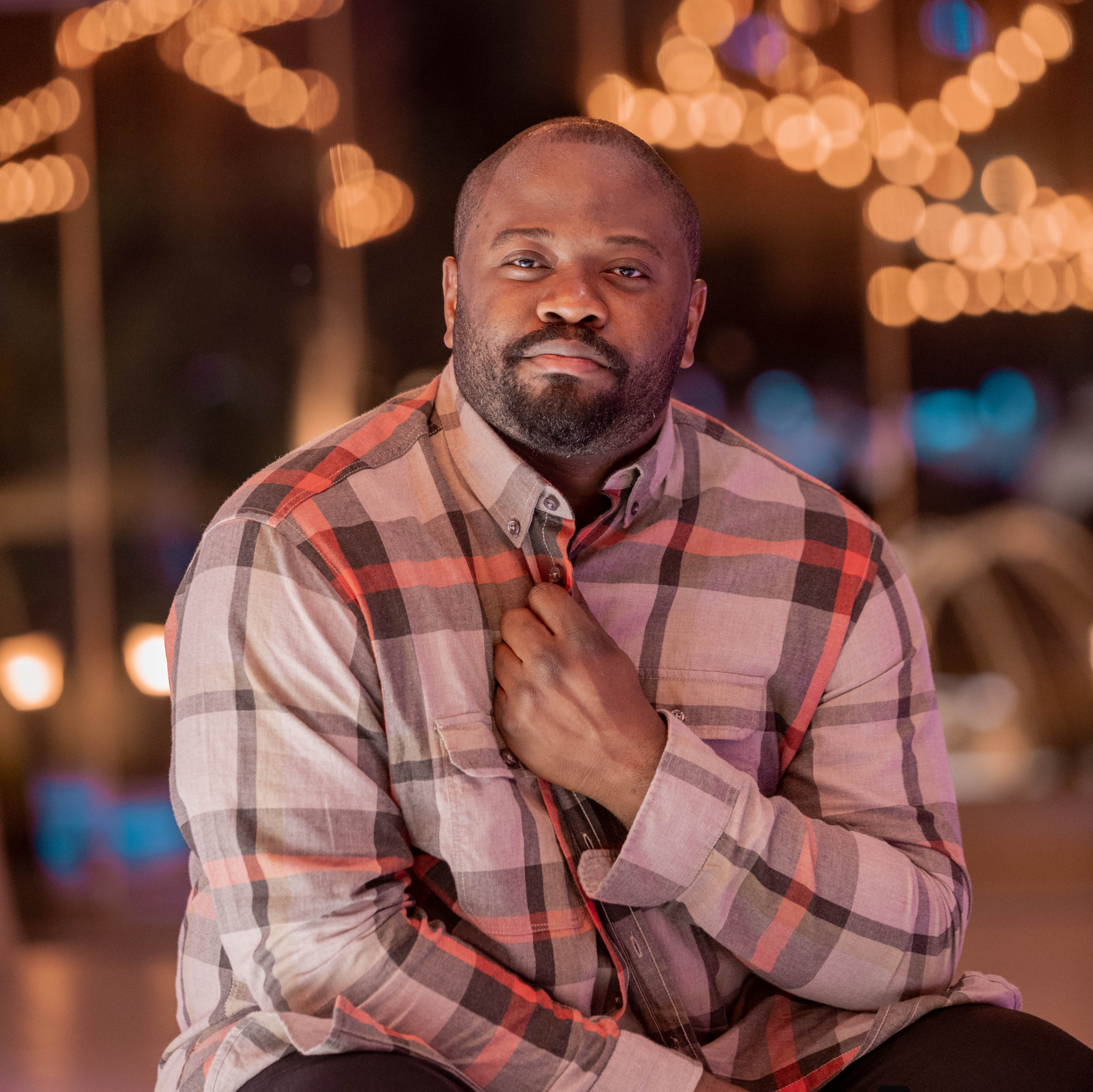
Moise Mbiye in 2022

From the 1980s onward, the growth of revivalist churches on both banks of the Congo River led to the widespread adoption of Christian music as a standalone genre. What began as congregational choirs evolved into full-fledged orchestras, structurally modeled on secular bands but dedicated to spiritual themes. This movement produced a generation of musicians who identified themselves as "Christian musicians" or "musician-Christians". Unlike traditional church-based groups, they were affiliated with revivalist congregations rather than traditional denominational affiliations. Rather than rejecting secular aesthetics, these groups retained the dance rhythms, melodic contours, and harmonic textures characteristic of Congolese popular music, which thus eroded distinctions between religious and secular music.

The genre spread rapidly and became embedded in Congolese social life and provided spiritual expression and entertainment. Notable figures in Kinshasa include Charles Mombaya, Brother Kabatshi, Brother Mente, Paul Balenza, the Couple Buloba, Dénis Ngonde, Kool Matopé, Runo Mvumbi, Kangumba, Brother Patrice Ngoy Musoko, Alain Moloto, Lifoko du Ciel, Maninga, Matou Samuel, Blaise Sakila, Feza Shamamba, Marie Misamu, the Cœur La Grâce choir, Makoma, Moise Mbiye, Sandra Mbuyi, Mike Kalambay, NK Divine, Faveur Mukoko, David Ize, Daniel Lubams, Jonathan Gambela, Ruth Kimongoli, Isaac Bukasa, Rosny Kayiba, Van Walesa, Eunice Manyanga, Fiston Mbuyi, among others. In Brazzaville, notable names include the Tanga Ni Tanga choir, Batangouna Sébastien, Christian Mahoukou, Moise Baniakina, Loudi Berthe, Tukindisa Nkembo, Sita Philippe, Sainte Odile Choir, Zola Choir, Les Colombes, and more. Their work popularized Congolese Christian music across Central Africa and beyond, aided by the proliferation of cassettes and broadcasts by publishers and producers who recognized the growing market for religious recordings.

=== Conversion of secular musicians, media spread, and modern challenges ===
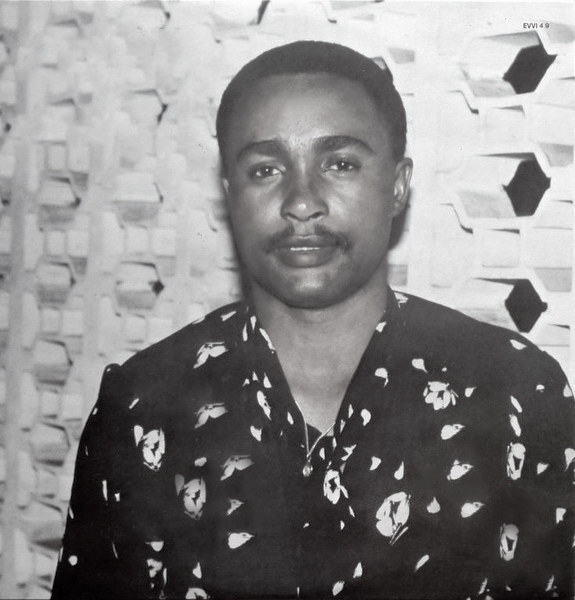
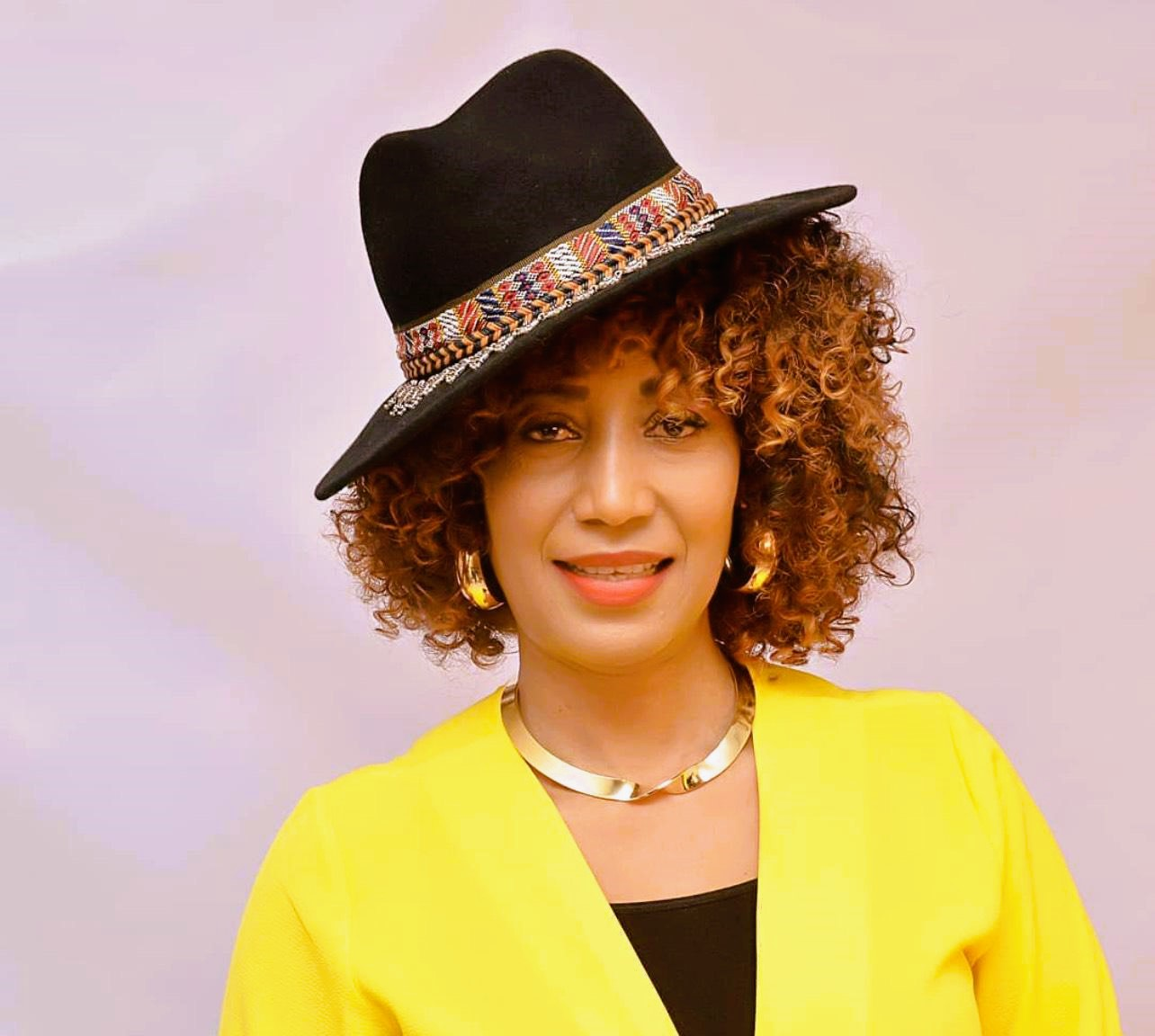
Originally secular artists, Debaba (left) and Jolie Detta (right) later renounced secular music and dedicated themselves to Christian music.

A significant feature of Congolese religious music has been the conversion of secular performers to sacred expression, a trend that gained visibility during the 1990s with artists such as Antoinette Etisomba Lokindji, Mopéro Wa Maloba (formerly of Orchestre Shama Shama), Kiese Diambu (formerly of Les Grands Maquisards, Afrisa International, and TPOK Jazz), Djonita Abanita, X-Or Zobena (formerly of Choc Stars), Debaba (formerly of Viva La Musica and Choc Stars), Carlyto Lassa (formerly of TPOK Jazz and Choc Stars), André Bimi Ombale (formerly of Zaïko Langa Langa, Zaïko Familia Dei, and Basilique Loningisa), Feza Shamamba, Michel Ndouniama (formerly of Bilenge Sakana), Jolie Detta, Charles Tchikou, and others. These musicians released Christian albums and integrated biblical themes into their repertoires, often surprising fans accustomed to their secular hits.

Over time, Congolese Christian music developed its own distribution networks, beginning with the establishment of Radio Sango Malamu as the first thematic station dedicated to religious music, which paved the way for others, including Radio Télé Message de Vie, Radio Télé Kintwadi, Radio Elikya, Radio Télé Puissance, Radio Télévision Armée de l'Éternel (RTAE), Amen TV, Canal le Chemin, La Vérité et la Vie, and many more.

In contemporary times, Congolese Christian music constitutes a genuine cultural phenomenon that rivals secular music in popularity, borrowing many of its stylistic features, including atalaku vocal interjections, intricate guitar solos, and choreographed dance routines. This stylistic convergence, however, has provoked debate, with critics arguing that the heavy reliance on secular aesthetics risks diluting the spiritual depth of Christian music, transforming it into another branch of variety entertainment. Nevertheless, its ability to uplift believers and provide spiritual reassurance preserves its relevance within Congolese society.

== Dances ==
Before the 20th century, Congolese dance was primarily characterized by indigenous forms such as the Kebo and Nzango. These dances were expressions of community life and were often performed in social gatherings and celebrations. However, the advent of the phonograph and radio broadcasting in the early 20th century introduced foreign dance styles into Congolese society. By the 1950s, imported rhythms and ballroom styles such as the polka, swing, cha-cha-cha, and tango had become popular in dance halls and social clubs in Kinshasa and Brazzaville. Even with these outside influences, Congolese audiences continued to maintain a strong connection to their traditional dance forms, particularly Congolese rumba.

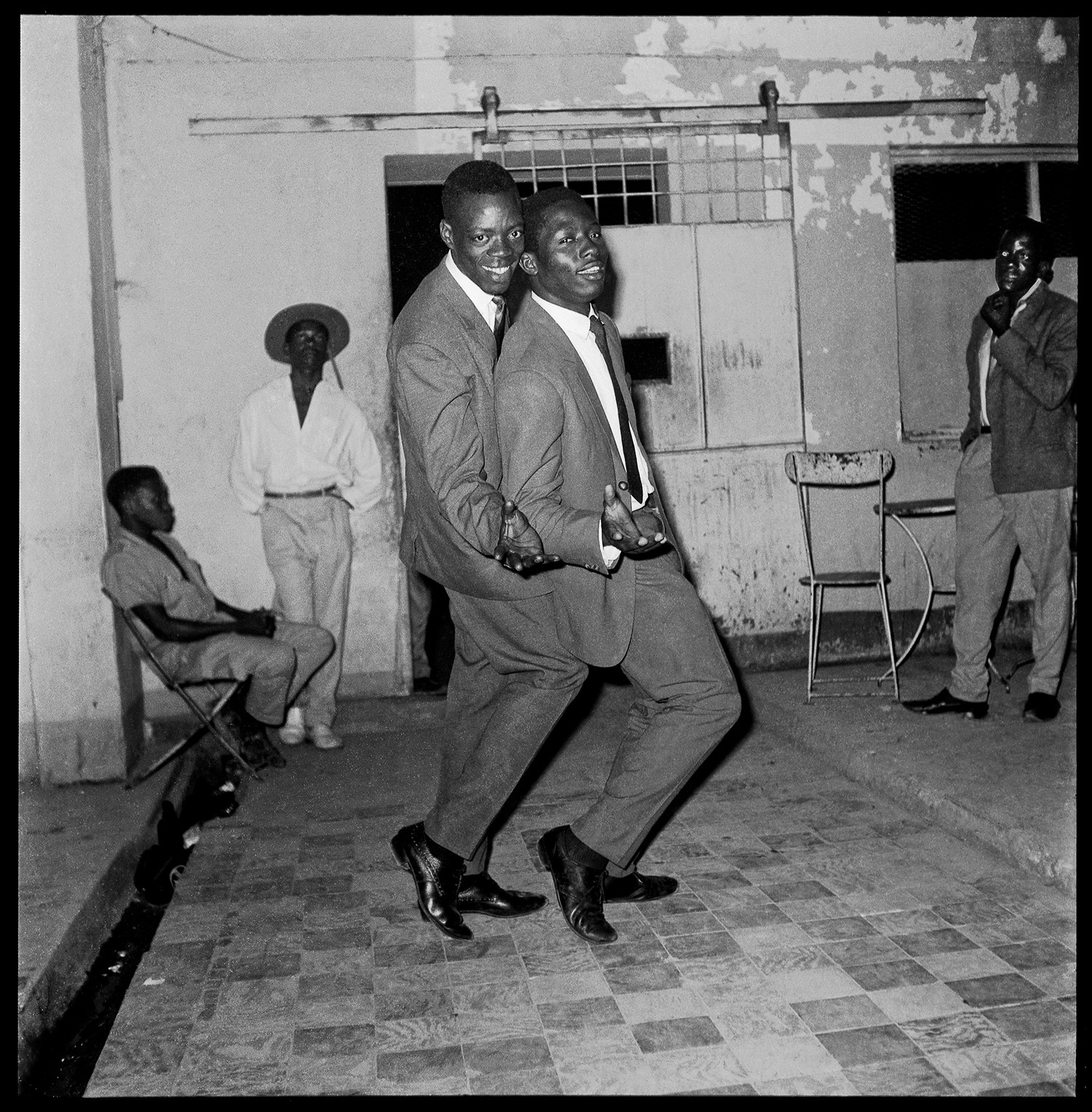
A duo performing at a Congolese rumba nightspot in Léopoldville, ca. 1950s–1960s

Congolese rumba became as the Congo's dominant musical and choreographic form. The dance was usually performed by couples and was recognized for its slow pace and close partner movements. Although later stylistic variants such as such as rumba Odemba and rumba karakara introduced subtle rhythmic and choreographic modifications, the structure and cadence of the dance remained largely the same.

In the mid-1960s, the appearance of the danse des bouchers ("butcher's dance") introduced a more accelerated beat pattern and a driving rhythmic pulse to Congolese dance culture. The dance was created by Bahonda and Balla and transformed the atmosphere of dance floors in Kinshasa and Brazzaville. Songs such as "Ba nguembo bo juger" by Les Bantous de la Capitale and "Ngai Marie nzoto ebeba" by Franco Luambo helped popularize the boucher style, which soon became one of the country's most popular dances. The dance gained particular support among the n'guembos, a term used for devoted fans who watched live performances from the rooftops surrounding open-air venues in Brazzaville and Kinshasa.

=== The emergence of new dance styles ===
Throughout the 1970s and 1980s, Congolese dance continued to evolve with the influence of global music trends such as disco, funk, reggae, and later, the rising prominence of pop and rock. The visit of James Brown to Kinshasa in the early 1970s had a profound influence on local dance and music. His influence is evident in the work of artists such as Matadidi Mário Buana Kitoko, Evoloko Jocker, and Mbuta Mashakado, whose music incorporated elements of funk and soul. Similarly, the eruption of international rhythms inspired a more eclectic blend of local and global influences. Artists like Zaïko Langa Langa, Lita Bembo, and others introduced dance steps that are now considered part of the core Congolese dance repertoire. For example, Zaïko Langa Langa's contribution includes movements like Ngouabin, Levole, Cavacha, Choquez Retardé, Disco Tara, Sonzo Ma, Volant/Guidon, Guidon, Washa Washa, Wondo Stock, Zekete Zekete, Elengi Eye, Maria, Funky, Tukuniema, Vimba, and Siska, while Lita Bembo's dances, such as Ekonda Saccadé, Mombombo Dominé, Osaka Dynastie and Caïmans, remain well-regarded for their inventiveness and unique characteristics.

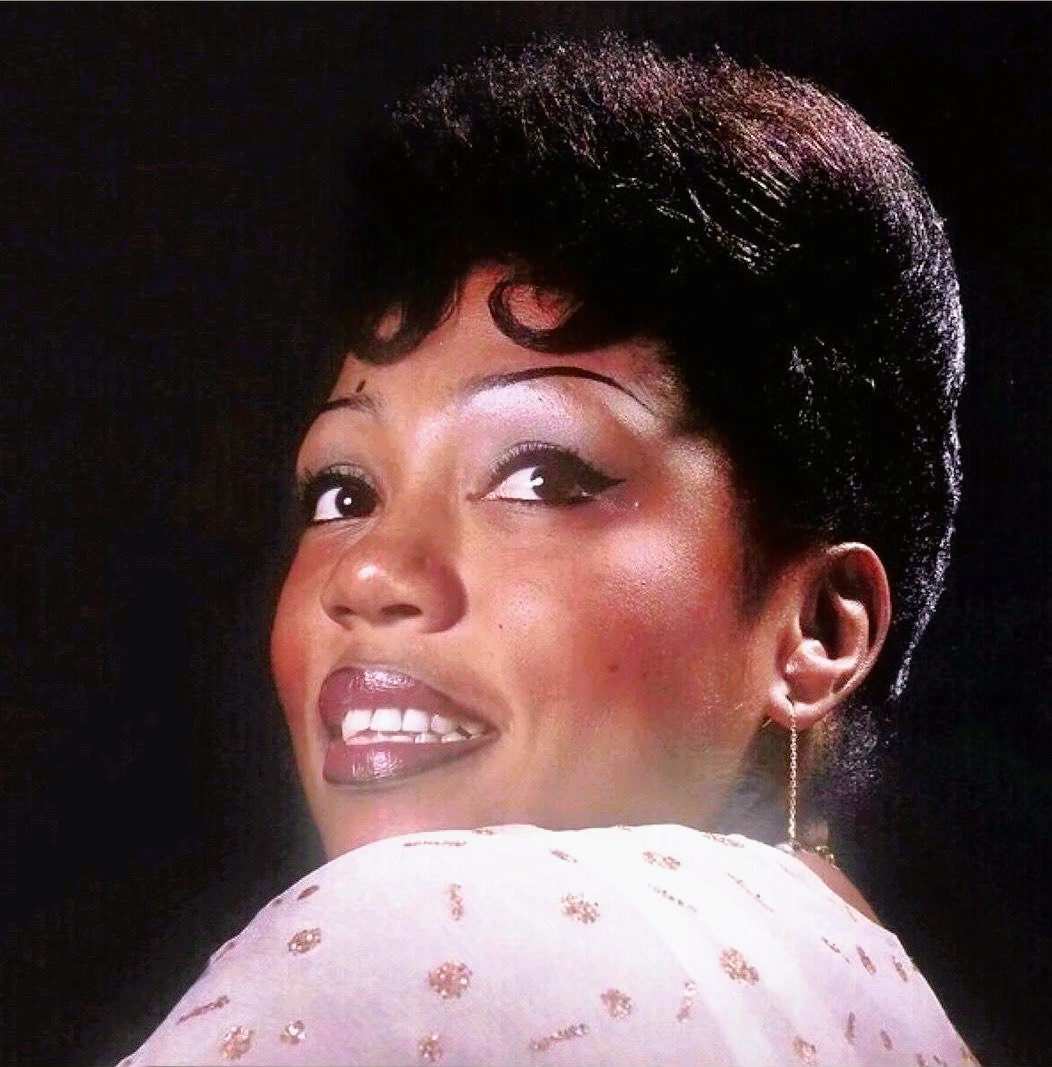
Abeti Masikini in 1978

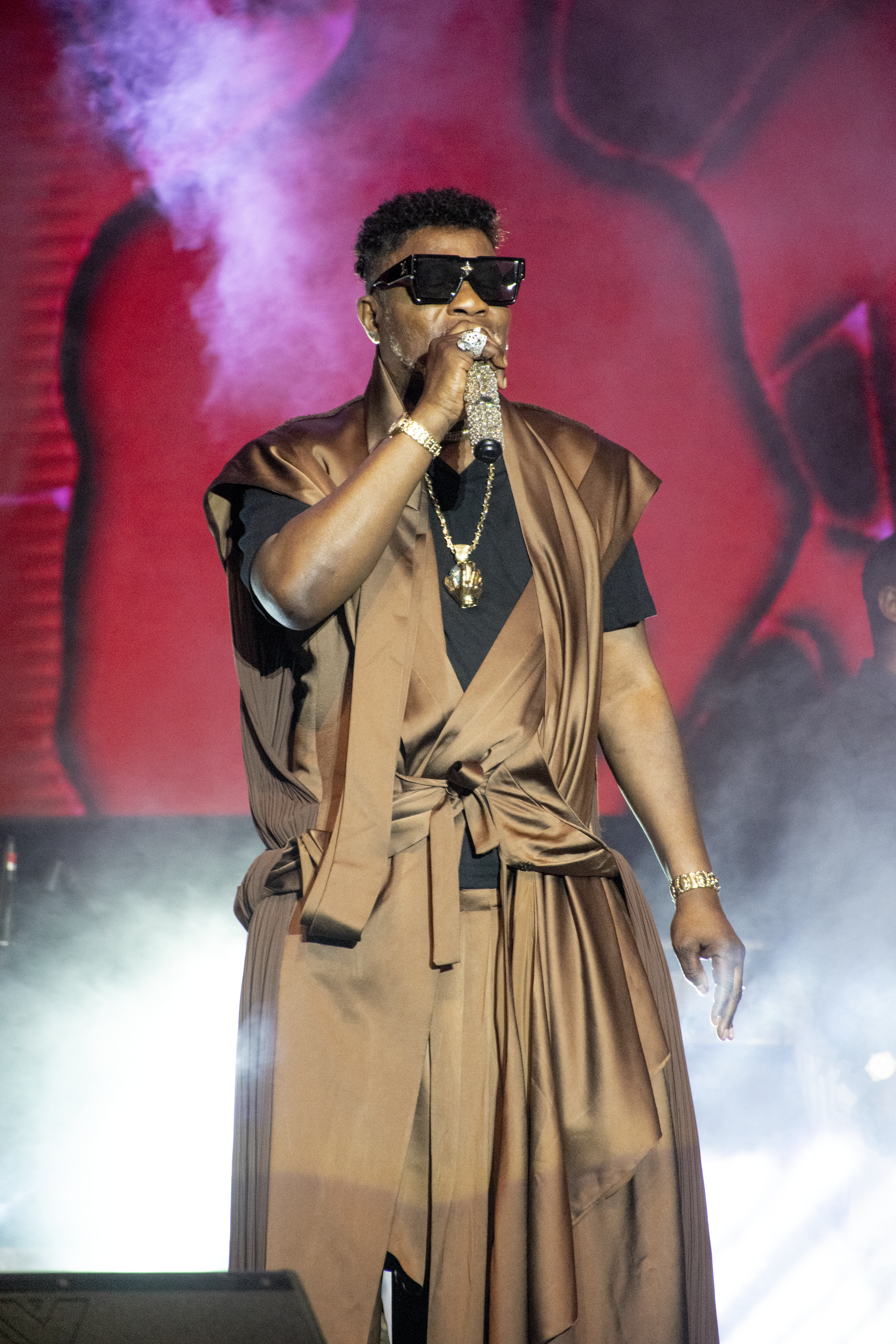
Koffi Olomide performing in 2024

By the late 1980s, dance in Congo had become increasingly fluid, with new styles emerging almost as quickly as the popularity of their predecessors waned. Among the most recognized is Kwassa Kwassa, a creation of Jeanora, which was performed internationally by artists like Abeti Masikini and Kanda Bongo Man. Other dances that gained widespread popularity include Sundawa by J... Swede, Mayeno by TPOK Jazz, and Madiaba by Zaïko Langa Langa. These dance trends mirrored the shifting preferences of music fans, particularly the younger generations in Kinshasa and Brazzaville, who were constantly seeking innovative rhythms for self-expression. During this period, certain musical groups became known for inventing their own unique dances. The band Viva La Musica was particularly notable for its distinctive dance moves, such as Mukonyono and Kuku dindon. The band set trends by introducing their own dance styles rather than following the mainstream, which led to them developing a strong following at home and abroad.

Selected list of modern Congolese dances:

Dances	Bands	Dances	Bands
Agbaya		Mali	Swédé Swédé
Apollo	TPOK Jazz	Mambeta	Orchestre Vox Africa
Araka	Swédé Swédé	Mapeka	Yoka Lokole
Atutana	Swédé Swédé	Maradona	Wenge Musica
Orfaz		Maringa	
Beni-Beni		Marteau Kibota	Grand Zaïko Wawa
Bidunda-Dunda	Sosoliso (Madjesi)	Masasi calculez	Empire Bakuba
Bilolo	Chic Choc Loyenge	Mata kita	Stukas
Bionda(la)	Orchestre Stukas	Mayenu	TPOK Jazz
Bolowa	Zaïko Langa Langa	Mbiri mbiri	Langa Langa Stars
Bosima		Mitelele	Zaïko Langa Langa
Boucher	African Fiesta National	Mobylette	African Fiesta Sukisa
Caneton	Minzoto Wella-Wella	Mokonyonyo	Viva La Musica
Cavacha	Zaïko Langa Langa	Mombombo	Orchestre Stukas
Cha-cha-cha	TPOK Jazz	Mosaka	Negro Succes
Choquez retardé	Zaiko Langa Langa	Motors rétro	Orchestre Stukas
Crapeau crapeau	Orchestre Stukas	Motuka monene	Station Japan
Dallas passeport	Langa Langa Stars	MutetaTeta	Choc Stars
Disco	Zaiko Langa Langa	Mutwashi	African Jazz/Tshala Muana
Ekonda saccadé	Orchestre Stukas	Mwambe	
Embonga		Nager sous-marin	Empire Bakuba
Engundu	Lay-Lay	Nyekese	Viva La Musica
Esakala	Groupe Mai-Ndombe	Nzango	
Esombi	Empire Bakuba	OTshenge	Libaku de Gina
Eza eza	Viva La Musica	Osaka dynasty	Orchestre Stukas
Fiona fiona	Bana Odeon	Parachute	Grand Zaïko Wawa
Griffe dindon	Viva La Musica	Patenge	
Guaben	Orchestre Vévé	Pompe bijection	Victoria Eleison
Isankele	Swédé Swédé	Rick Son	Viva La Musica
Jobs	African Fiesta National	Rikitele ja rwaka	Station Japan
Kara kara	African Jazz	Rumba-rock	Viva La Musica
Katakumech	Victoria Eleison	Sengola	Grand Zaïko Wawa
Kebo		Silauka	Zaïko Langa Langa
Kede		Silikoti	
Kiri-kiri	African Fiesta Sukisa	Sonzo-ma	Zaïko Langa Langa
Kourou bondo	Orchestre Bella Bella	Soukous	Orchestre Sinza Kotoko
Kuanza	Empire Bakuba	Soum djoum	African Fiesta National
Kuku dindon	Viva La Musica	Suelema	Choc Stars
Kurunyenge	Viva La Musica	Sundama	Swédé Swédé
Kwassa kwassa	Bana Lingwala/Jeanora	Tara	Zaïko Langa Langa
Liyoto		Tora	Station Japan
Lofimbo	Isifi Lokole	Toyo motors	Orchestre Stukas
Longenya		Tsheke tsheke	Tsheke-Tsheke Love
Loyenge bulubulu	Les Grands Maquisards	Volant	Zaïko Langa Langa
Lubelu tadi-tadi	Minzoto Wella-Wella	Watsha watsha	Zaïko Langa Langa
Mabata lay	Bella-Bella	Wondo stock	Zaïko Langa Langa
Machota	Viva La Musica	Yeye	Anti-Choc
Madiaba	Bana Lemba		

== Bibliography ==
- Ewens, Graeme (2000). "Heart of Darkness". In Broughton, Simon; Ellingham, Mark (eds.). World Music. Vol. I: Africa, Europe and the Middle East. Durham: Penguin. pp. 458–71. ISBN 1-85828-636-0.
- Stewart, Gary (2000). Rumba on the River: A History of the Popular Music of the two Congos. London: Verso. ISBN 1-85984-744-7.
- White, Bob W. (2008). Rumba Rules: The Politics of Dance Music in Mobutu's Zaire. Durham: Duke University Press. ISBN 978-0822340911.
