= Zaïko Langa Langa discography =

- Studio albums: 30
- Live albums: 10
- Compilation albums: 21
- Remix albums: 1
- Mixes: 1

Congolese soukous band Zaïko Langa Langa has released 30 official studio albums, 10 live albums, 22 compilations, 1 mix album and 1 remix album.

== Albums ==
=== Studio albums ===
Title	Album details	Note
Non Stop Dancing	Released: 1974; Label: Zaire Music; Format: LP	
Plaisir de l'Ouest Afrique (volume 1 and 2)	Released: 1976; Label: Essiebons; Format: LP	Reissued on CD as "Zaire Ghana" (1993, RetroAfric)
Tangi / Avis	Released: 1980; Label: Fan Club Zaïko; Format: LP	
Gitta Production présente le Tout-Choc Zaïko Langa-Langa	Released: 1981; Label: Gitta; Format: LP	Reissued on CD as "Hits Inoubliables Vol. III : Petit...Confiance" (1997, Éditions Plus De Paris)
Tout Choc	Released: 1982; Label: Gitta; Format: LP	Reissued on compilation "Hits Inoubliables Vol. VII" (1997, Éditions Plus De Paris)
Funky (volume 1 and 2)	Released: September 1982; Label: ProZal, C.I.D. International Corporation; Format: LP	Reissued on CD as "Le Beau Temps" (1996, Jacko Production)
La Tout Neige, Christine & Nalali Mpongui	Released: 1983; Label: Fan Club Zaïko; Format: LP	Recorded in 1980; Reissued on CD as "Grand Success De Zaïko Langa Langa" (1993, Flame Tree), "Hits Inoubliables Vol. V" (1997, Éditions Plus De Paris)
L'Orchestre de tous les Âges	Released: 1983; Label: Éditions Veve International; Format: LP	Recorded in 1980
Muvaro/Etape	Released: 1983; Label: I.A.D.; Format: LP	
Zekete Zekete 2è Épisode	Released: August 1983; Label: ProZal, Sonogravure; Format: LP	
On Gagne Le Procès	Released: June 1984; Label: ProZal, Manglo Production; Format: LP	Reissued on CD as "L'Authéntique Zaïko Langa Langa" (1992, Sonodisc)
Zaïko Eyi Nkisi	Released: 1985; Label: ProZal; Format: LP	Reissued on CD as "Hits Inoubliables Vol. II" (1995, Éditions Plus De Paris)
Tala Modèle Echanger	Released: 1985; Label: ProZal; Format: LP	Reissued on compilation "Hits Inoubliables Vol. I" (1995, Éditions Plus De Paris)
Eh Ngoss! Eh Ngoss! Eh Ngoss!	Released: 1986; Label: ProZal; Format: LP	Reissued on CD as "Hits Inoubliables Vol. I" (1995, Éditions Plus De Paris)
Pusa Kuna...Serrez Serrez!	Released: 1986; Label: ProZal; Format: LP	Reissued on CD as "Hits Inoubliables Vol. IV" (1997, Éditions Plus De Paris)
Nippon Banzai	Released: December 1986; Label: ProZal; Format: LP, CD, cassette	
Papa Omar	Released: May 1987; Label: ProZal, N'Goss Productions; Format: LP, CD	
Subissez les Conséquences	Released: December 1987; Label: ProZal, Sonodisc; Format: LP, CD, cassette	
Jetez l'Éponge	Released: 1989; Label: Carrere, New Deal; Format: LP, CD, cassette	
Ici Ça Va...Fungola Motema	Released: December 1990; Label: ProZal; Format: LP, CD, cassette	
Jamais Sans Nous	Released: 1991; Label: Tamaris; Format: LP, CD, cassette	
Avis De Recherche	Released: May 31, 1995; Label: Syllart, Sterns Music; Format: LP, CD, cassette	
Sans Issue	Released: 1996; Label: Sun Records; Format: CD	
Backline Lesson One	Released: 7 April 1997; Label: Sonima Music; Format: CD	
Nous Y Sommes	Released: April 1998; Label: Ets N'Diaye; Format: CD, cassette	
Poison	Released: September 1999; Label: JPS Productions; Format: CD, cassette	
Eureka	Released: December 23, 2002; Label: JPS Productions; Format: CD	
Empreinte	Released: December 3, 2004; Label: ProZal, WBE; Format: CD, DVD	
Rencontres	Released: September 7, 2007; Label: Wedoo, ProZal; Format: CD, DVD	
Sève	Released: September 7, 2019; Label: ProZal; Format: CD, digital download	

=== Live albums ===
Title	Album details
Oka Biso!!! Tokangi Robinet!!!	Released: 1981; Label: ProZal; Format: LP
In Memoriam DV Moanda	Released: 1984; Label: Manglo Production; Format: LP
Zaïko Nkolo Mboka en Live	Released: 1991; Label: Flash Diffusion Business; Format: LP, CD
Live à Marignan	Released: 2007; Label: Freddy Mwelwa; Format: CD, DVD (package)
Live 38è Anniversaire	Released: 2007; Label: ProZal; Format: CD, DVD (package)
Moellon Ma Siska Ya Wana (Live Fikin 2012)	Released: 2012; Label: ProZal; Format: CD, DVD (package)
Live Bas-Congo (Olingi Mola Vimbaah)	Released: 2012; Label: ProZal; Format: CD, DVD (package)
Concert Dubaï Expo 2020	Released: April 15, 2022; Label: ProZal; Format: Digital download
Madeleine En Fête : 19 Mai 2024	Released: June 9, 2024; Label: ProZal; Format: Digital download
Concert Zénith	Released: June 8, 2026; Label: ProZal; Format: Digital download

=== Compilation albums ===
Title	Album details
L'Afrique Danse avec Zaïko Langa Langa	Released: 1976; Label: African; Format: LP
Les Grands Succès des Éditions Veve - Vol. 6	Released: 1978; Label: Sonafric; Format: LP
L'Afrique Danse	Released: 1978; Label: African; Format: LP
1970-1974 - Anciens Succès	Released: 1983; Label: Afrima; Format: LP
Oldies And Goodies	Released: 1985; Label: Manglo Corporation; Format: LP
Verckys présente Zaïko Langa Langa	Released: 1988; Label: Éditions Veve International; Format: LP
Hits Inoubliables (volumes I, II, III, IV, V, VI, VII, VIII, IX)	Released: 1995 (I and II), 1997 (III to IX); Label: Éditions Plus De Paris; Format: CD
Les Éveilleurs de l'Orchestre Zaïko (volumes 1 and 2)	Released: 1996; Label: Ngoyarto; Format: CD
Pacha Labaran	Released: 1997; Label: Sonodisc; Format: CD
Sentiment Awa / Essesse	Released: 2003; Label: Ngoyarto; Format: CD
Original Masters of Zaïko Langa Langa	Released: 2007; Label: Wedoo, ProZal; Format: CD
Les Meilleurs Souvenirs (volumes 1, 2 and 3)	Released: 2008; Label: Saga; Format: CD

=== Remix albums ===
Title	Album details
Bongama Kamata Position	Released: November 1987; Label: Sonodisc; Format: LP

=== Mixes ===
Title	Album details
Anthologie: Les Plus Grands Succès de Zaïko Langa Langa	Released: 2002; Label: Sono, Kiki Productions; Format: CD

== Singles ==
=== 1970s ===
Year	Title	Album
1970	"Mosinzo Nganga" / "Pauline"	Non-album singles
1970	"La Tout Neige" / "Francine Keller"	Non-album singles
1971	"Aurélie"	Non-album singles
1972	"Mado" / "Mbuli Ya M.T."	Non-album singles
1972	"Consolation" / "Amoureux Déçu"	Non-album singles
1972	"Charlotte Adieu N'Athénée" / "Zina Zonga"	Non-album singles
1972	"Khadi Ya Mama" / "Mimerite"	Non-album singles
1972	"Belmondo" / "Michelis Fe"	Non-album singles
1972	"Cele Fely" / "Mamiwani"	Non-album singles
1972	"Nimerita"	Non-album singles
1973	"Eluzam"	Non Stop Dancing
1973	"Selenge"	Non-album singles
1973	"Errare Humanum Est" / "Michael"	Non-album singles
1973	"Vie Ya Mosolo" / "C'est La Vérité"	Non-album singles
1973	"Bakumba" / "Onassis"	Non-album singles
1973	"B.P. Ya Munu" / "Celio"	Non-album singles
1973	"Mbeya Mbeya"	Non Stop Dancing
1973	"Chouchouna"	Non-album singles
1973	"Zena"	Non Stop Dancing
1973	"Bakumba" / "Onassis"	Non-album singles
1973	"Yo Nalinga"	Non-album singles
1973	"Zania"	Non Stop Dancing
1974	"Amando"	Non-album singles
1974	"Semeki Mondo"	Non Stop Dancing
1974	"Mwana Wabi"	Non Stop Dancing
1974	"Ando"	Non-album singles
1974	"Ndonge"	Non-album singles
1974	"Ngadiadia"	Non-album singles
1974	"Etape" / "Ngongi"	Non-album singles
1974	"Ndendeli"	Non-album singles
1974	"Liziba"	Non-album singles
1974	"Eboza"	Non-album singles
1975	"Mizou"	Non-album singles
1975	"Yudasi"	Non-album singles
1975	"Libota"	Non-album singles
1975	"Lisapo"	Non-album singles
1975	"Mbelengo"	Non-album singles
1975	"Elo"	Non-album singles
1976	"Beli Mashakado"	Non-album singles
1976	"Kin Kiesse"	Non-album singles
1976	"Zaïko Wa Wa"	Plaisir de l'Ouest Afrique
1976	"Ma"	Plaisir de l'Ouest Afrique
1976	"Nalali Pongi"	Non-album singles
1976	"Ima"	Non-album singles
1977	"Esikenebe"	Non-album singles
1977	"Toli Ya Lyanza"	Non-album singles
1977	"Nadi"	Non-album singles
1977	"Makoko"	Non-album singles
1977	"Lidjo"	Non-album singles
1977	"Omibongisa"	Non-album singles
1977	"Toli Kulumpe"	Non-album singles
1977	"Pacha Labaran"	Non-album singles
1977	"Sangela"	Non-album singles
1977	"Youyou"	Non-album singles
1978	"Toutou"	Non-album singles
1978	"Belingo"	Non-album singles
1978	"Misolina"	Non-album singles
1978	"Koko Zonga"	Non-album singles
1978	"Mbichana Motema"	Non-album singles
1978	"Verra"	Non-album singles
1978	"Migue"	Non-album singles
1978	"Mangobo"	Non-album singles
1978	"Diakina"	Non-album singles
1978	"Souvenir Masa"	Non-album singles
1978	"Diana Ya Mama"	Non-album singles
1979	"Ariya Kefi"	Non-album singles
1979	"Aziza"	Non-album singles
1979	"Obi"	Non-album singles
1979	"Déception Likinga"	Non-album singles
1979	"C'Est Trop Tard Mimi"	Non-album singles
1979	"Kwiti Kwiti"	Non-album singles
1979	"Chérie N'Zemo"	Non-album singles
1979	"Sentiment Awa"	Non-album singles
1979	"Zaïko Dix Ans"	Non-album singles
1979	"Moni Amina"	Non-album singles
1979	"Femme Noire"	Oka Biso !!! Tokangi Robinet !!!

=== 1980s ===
Year	Title	Album
1980	"Alitania"	Non-album singles
1980	"Bisengo Na Bango"	Non-album singles
1980	"Nalapi Ndayi"	Non-album singles
1980	"Crois-Moi"	L'Orchestre de tous les Âges
1980	"Fièvre Mondo"	L'Orchestre de tous les Âges
1980	"Amitié"	Non-album singles
1980	"Femme Ne Pleure Pas"	Non-album singles
1980	"Zaïko 10 Ans"	Non-album singles
1980	"Langa Langa Oyé"	Non-album singles
1981	"Lolita"	Non-album singles
1981	"Esese Na Ngai"	Non-album singles
1981	"Cherie N'Zemo Bis"	
1981	"Kinshasa Makambo"	Non-album singles
1982	"Manzaka Ebende"	Nkolo Mboka
1982	"Kamanzi"	Gitta Production présente le Tout-Choc Zaïko Langa-Langa
1982	"Baby"	Tout Choc
1983	"Wedu Bis"	Non-album singles
1983	"Infidélité"	Zekete Zekete 2è Épisode
1984	"Massela"	On Gagne Le Procès
1985	"Anzele Muambu"	Tala Modèle Echanger
1985	"Ize Bola"	Tala Modèle Echanger
1985	"Kabobo"	Tala Modèle Echanger
1986	"Ben Betito"	Pusa Kuna... Serrez ! Serrez !
1988	"Muvaro" / "Sandra Lina"	Nippon Banzai
1989	"Nibe"	Subissez les Conséquences

=== Maxi-singles ===
Title	Album details
Zaïko Langa Langa à Bongoville	Released: 1986; Label: ProZal; Format: LP
Feeling	Released: June 2001; Label: JPS Productions; Format: CD
Bande Annonce	Released: 6 August 2011; Label: ProZal; Format: CD
Sisikaaaaaahh! Moto na Moto na...	Released: 2 August 2014; Label: ProZal; Format: CD, DVD
Makinu	Released: 17 October 2025; Label: ProZal; Format: Digital download

== Videos ==
=== Video albums ===
- Jamais Sans Nous (1992)
- Avis De Recherche (1995)
- Sans Issue (1997)
- 6 Titres Inédits - Clips (includes music videos of Sans Issue, Backline Lesson One and Jetez l'éponge, 1997)
- Nous Y Sommes (1998)
- Poison (2000)
- Feeling (2001)
- Empreinte (includes music videos of album Eureka, 2004)
- Rencontres (2007)
- Sisikaaaaaahh ! Moto na Moto na... (2014)
