= Non Stop Dancing =

Studio album by Zaïko Langa Langa
- Released: 1974
- Recorded: December 1973–June 1974
- Studio: Bokelo (Lemba, Kinshasa)
- Genre: Congolese rumba
- Length: 42:00
- Label: Zaire Music
- Producer: Mfumu Muntu Bambi

Zaïko Langa Langa chronology
Non Stop Dancing (1974)	Plaisir de l'Ouest Afrique (1976)

Non Stop Dancing is the debut studio album by the Congolese rumba band Zaïko Langa Langa. Produced by Mfumu Muntu Bambi, it was released on the Zaire Music label in late 1974.

It consists of songs recorded and released between 1973 and 1974, during multiple recording sessions of the band in Kinshasa. Prior to the album's release, Zaïko Langa Langa performed at the Zaire 74 music festival at the Stade Du 20 Mai in Kinshasa, along with other notable artists such as James Brown, B.B. King, Tabu Ley Rochereau, and Franco Luambo.

Not long after its release, it had become a cultural phenomenon in Kinshasa and had sold out across all major record stores days after its release.

== Background ==
Shortly after Zaïko Langa Langa's debut in December 1969, the band established itself as the "third Congolese school of music". Because of their "rebellious" and "hippie" attitude and their innovative approach to Congolese rumba, they became a symbol of the new generations of post-independence Zaire, and are sometimes compared to the Rolling Stones for their appeal to the youth.

In 1973, while traveling from Brazzaville to Pointe-Noire, the band's drummer, Meridjo Belobi, pioneered the Cavacha drum rhythm. The Cavacha was later played by all Kinshasa bands and other African artists from all over the continent. Cavacha was also the name of a dance created by Evoloko Jocker.

== Recording ==
Recording sessions took place in 1973 ("Zania", "Mbeya Mbeya", "Eluzam" and "Zena") and 1974 ("Semeki Mondo" and "Mwana Wabi") in Johnny Bokelo's studio, located in Lemba (Kinshasa). Songs were previously released as singles.

== Track listing ==
Side one

No.	Title	Writer(s)	Length
1.	"Semeki Mondo"	Evoloko Jocker	11:00
2.	"Zania"	Mavuela Somo	5:00
3.	"Eluzam"	Evoloko Jocker	5:00

Side two

No.	Title	Writer(s)	Length
4.	"Mwana Wabi"	Bimi Ombale	11:00
5.	"Zena"	Bimi Ombale	5:00
6.	"Mbeya Mbeya"	Evoloko Jocker	5:00
Total length:			42:00

== Personnel ==
- Evoloko Jocker – vocals
- Papa Wemba – vocals
- Jossart N'Yoka Longo – vocals
- Mavuela Somo – vocals
- Bozi Boziana – vocals
- Gina Efonge – vocals
- Bimi Ombale – vocals
- Manuaku Waku – lead guitar
- Enoch Zamuangana – rhythm guitar
- Teddy Sukami – rhythm guitar
- Oncle Bapius – bass guitar
- Meridjo Belobi – drums
- Bakunde Ilo Pablo – drums
- D. V. Moanda – congas
