= Subissez les Conséquences =

Studio album by Zaïko Langa Langa
- Released: December 1987
- Recorded: 1987
- Genre: Congolese rumba
- Length: 30:18
- Label: ProZal
- Producer: Jossart N'Yoka Longo

Zaïko Langa Langa chronology
Bongama Kamata Position (1987)	Subissez les Conséquences (1987)	Jetez l'éponge (1989)

Subissez les Conséquences is the eighteenth studio album by the Congolese rumba band Zaïko Langa Langa, first released in December 1987 through ProZal, following Papa Omar from May of the same year.

Clocking in at a compact 30 minutes across just four tracks, Subissez les Conséquences stands as a snapshot of the band's "classic" late-1980s lineup, shortly before the major 1988 split that resulted in the birth of Zaïko Langa Langa Familia Dei. The album's title, meaning "face the consequences", is often viewed as a subtle premonition of that breakup. Upon its release, Subissez les Conséquences drew attention from loyal fans and new Western listeners who had become interested in African popular music during the decade. Copies also circulated in Latin America, particularly in Colombia, where the band's repertoire was among the early known Congolese recordings and the song "Nibe" was nicknamed "El Buey".

A remastered digital edition was released in 2022 on major streaming platforms.

== Background ==
By 1987, Zaïko Langa Langa, founded in Kinshasa in 1969, had long since cemented its status as a revolutionary force in modern African popular music. By ditching traditional brass sections in favor of searing electric guitars, intricate percussion, and the explosive vocal atalaku animations, the band pioneered a lean, dance-driven sound that stripped rumba to its rhythmic core and laid the groundwork for the ndombolo explosion of the 1990s and beyond.

Beneath the success, however, tensions were mounting over royalties, compensation, and leadership. Defying the odds, Zaïko Langa Langa celebrated their 18th anniversary (celebrated after the album release) with a two-day event at the Palais du Peuple in Kinshasa, featuring massive audiences and guest performances by Papa Wemba, Evoloko Jocker, Mavuela Somo, and Félix Manuaku Waku.

== Production and composition ==
=== Recording ===
Recorded in Brussels in 1987, hot on the heels of their earlier effort Papa Omar, Subissez les Conséquences shows subtler stylistic experimentation. The track "Moyen Te" features Nicolas Fiszman. According to later recollections from band member JP Buse, "Kevalina" was initially overlooked during sessions, languishing until Buse collaborated with Paris-based Congolese musician Bony Bikaye on an arrangement. This sparked a reworking by Mbuta Matima, who infused it with "Zaïko color", gradually drawing in more voices for the recording. Leader Jossart N'Yoka Longo allegedly told Buse that he was going to contribute backing vocals but ended up solely performing atalaku animation.

=== Music and lyrics ===
Subissez les Conséquences departs from the band's traditional Congolese rumba foundation toward a sound infused with funk-inspired bass lines and dance-pop sensibilities, giving it a sleek, cosmopolitan feel that straddles innovation and a slightly unmoored quality from tradition. The four tracks showcase the band's signature interplay of soaring vocals, propulsive rhythms, and crowd-igniting animations.

Opening with Bimi Ombale's "Nibe", a reflective Congolese rumba ballad about a woman wounded by past love and hesitant to trust again. Enoch Zamuangana's "Lisumu", also steeped in Congolese rumba, depicts the pain and shame of a breakup made public, rendered through intricate guitar lines and traditional percussion evocative of the band's early sound. Buse's "Kevalina" takes a more assertive tone, featuring a protagonist urging his lover to dismiss gossip and outside interference. The album concludes with Popolipo's "Moyen Te", which leans into dance-pop-flavored fretless bass grooves to propel a mid-tempo exploration of relational dynamics, while the band's atalaku animations reach their characteristic frenzy.

== Cover ==
The cover was designed by Jacques Duquesne and Joss Bokken. The sleeve features a photograph taken from upper behind the stage during a 1987 Zaïko Langa Langa concert at the Salle de la Madeleine in Brussels.

== Critical reception ==
In its March 1988 Tam-Tam review, Zaïko Langa Langa's Subissez les Conséquences is hailed as another spellbinding entry in the band's hypnotic saga: "Les Zaïko se suivent et se ressemblent!" yet fans crave more, bewitched by their "musical fétiches". The critic spotlights Bimi Ombale's vocals on "Nibe" and the delirious, full-throttle animation "Maria hé", a fiery winter antidote that warms the soul.

== Track listing ==
Side one
No.	Title	Writer(s)	Length
1.	"Nibe"	Bimi Ombale	8:03
2.	"Lisumu"	Enoch Zamuangana	7:26

Side two
No.	Title	Writer(s)	Length
1.	"Kevalina"	JP Buse	7:27
2.	"Moyen Te"	Popolipo	7:22

== Personnel ==
- Jossart N'Yoka Longo – vocals (1, 2, 4), animation
- Bimi Ombale – vocals (1, 3)
- Lengi Lenga – vocals
- Dindo Yogo – vocals
- JP Buse – vocals
- Nono Monzuluku – animation, shaker
- Bébé Atalaku – animation, shaker
- Mbuta Matima – arrangements, rhythm guitar (1)
- Beniko Popolipo – lead guitar (3, 4), bass guitar (1)
- Petit Poisson – lead guitar (1, 2), mi-solo guitar (3)
- Jimmy Yaba – mi-solo guitar (1, 2, 4), rhythm guitar (3)
- Enoch Zamuangana – rhythm guitar (2, 4)
- Oncle Bapius – bass guitar (2)
- Yvon Kabamba – bass guitar (3)
- Nicolas Fiszman – bass guitar (4)
- Meridjo Belobi – drums
- Bakunde Ilo Pablo – drums
- José Piano Piano – synth
- Djerba Manzeku – congas
