= Jamais Sans Nous =

Jamais sans nous

Studio album by Zaïko Langa Langa
- Released: December 1991
- Studios: Square, Brussels
- Genre: Congolese rumba
- Length: 38:01 (LP version); 50:21 (CD version)
- Label: Tamaris
- Producer: Jossart N'Yoka Longo

Zaïko Langa Langa chronology
Ici ça va… Fungola motema (1990)	Jamais sans nous (1991)	Avis de Recherche (1995)

Jamais sans nous (French: Never without us) is a studio album by Congolese rumba band Zaïko Langa Langa, released in December 1991 through Tamaris. The album was commercially successful and reached number one on the UK Sterns Music Charts in January 1992 shortly after its release. The six-track record featured the hits "Masudi", "Reviens Hyppau", "Dede", and "Persévérer" that went on to became some of the most popular in the band's catalog. "Dede" and "Persévérer" were re-recorded and included on other releases.

== Background ==
According to Jossart N'Yoka Longo, the band's leader and president, the title Jamais sans nous was chosen to because is an important part of the history of Congolese music. Since the band was founded on 24 December 1969 in the Kasa-Vubu commune of Kinshasa, it has regularly introduced new styles and approaches to Congolese rumba while keeping elements of its original style. Although some of its innovations were questioned at first, many eventually became part of the standard sound of the genre.

== Production and composition ==
The album was recorded at Studio Square in Brussels, with Mbuta Matima directed the recording sessions. However, before the work was completed, the group had to return unexpectedly to Kinshasa because of an urgent situation, which left the project unfinished. Since the musicians did not have enough time to complete the recordings, Matima remained in Brussels and finalized the album by himself.

What Matima inherited was a work-in-progress. Some tracks existed as final takes, while many others featured only voix témoins, provisional guide-vocal recordings used as placeholders during mixing, rather than definitive performances. Working in atypical conditions, Matima was left with a small team of collaborators to see the album through Jean-Paul Kalko, who handled drum programming and additional guitar and vocal work, also sharing mixing duties, Jean-Jacques Bayonne, a former Brazzaville singer associated with the band Orchestre Zimbabwe, the Tamaris label and owner of the Le 5 sur 5 nightclub in Brazzaville, brought in to provide additional vocal animations and Claudio Pastecchia who overdubbed keyboards. Matima himself added animations and took the songs to completion.

Jamais sans nous was Mbuta Matima's last project with Zaïko Langa Langa. Shortly after the album was completed, his health began to decline. He was later diagnosed with throat cancer and moved to Liège, Belgium, where he spent the rest of his life. Matima died on 26 May 1996 at the age of 45.

== Cover ==
According to Eddy Ngombé, the album's sleeve presented its own challenge as no official group photograph was available at the time of pressing. During an evening event, Jean-Jacques Bayonne was photographed performing the iconic dances associated with Zaïko Langa Langa's live performances, including Etutana and Mayele Mabe. These movements were then rendered by Tamaris' art direction team as illustrations and stylized for the cover design, producing a spare, distinctive visual that became one of the most recognizable covers in the group's entire discography.

== Legacy ==
The album's legacy is closely tied to its impact on modern Congolese rumba and soukous music. While the use of the distortion pedal was not new to Congolese music, having already been explored in rumba by pioneering guitarists such as Félix Manuaku Waku and Rigo Star, as well as in other forms of Congolese popular music, Shiro Mvuemba revitalized and popularized the effect for a new generation through his sebene solo on "Poupa". His interpretation gave the distorted guitar a fresh prominence and helped to make it fashionable again and inspiring many guitarists who followed.

"Persévérer" was given the piconema "El Meque" and "La Pelea" by the Colombian audience of the band.

== Track listing ==
Jamais sans nous was released on LP, CD and cassette format. Instrumental versions of "Reviens Hyppau" and "Dede" are included on the CD version.

Side one
No.	Title	Writer(s)	Length
1.	"Reviens Hyppau"	Mbuta Matima	6:02
2.	"Masudi"	Patcho Star	6:35
3.	"Videma"	Omer Boanga	6:08

Side two
No.	Title	Writer(s)	Length
1.	"Dede"	Jossart N'Yoka Longo	6:20
2.	"Persévérer"	Oncle Bapius	6:17
3.	"Poupa"	Mondial Mafuta	6:35

== Personnel ==
The personnel credits are adapted from the album booklet and Eddy Ngombé's interview.

- Jossart N'Yoka Longo – vocals (tracks 1, 3, 4)
- Adamo Ekula – vocals (tracks 1–4, 6)
- Malage de Lugendo – vocals
- Mondial Mafuta – vocals
- Thylon Muanda – vocals
- Doudou Adoula – animation
- Nono Monzuluku – animation, shaker
- Shiro Mvuemba – lead guitar (tracks 2, 6)
- Baroza Bansimba – lead guitar (tracks 4, 5)
- Mbuta Matima – lead guitar (tracks 1, 3), rhythm guitar, additional animation, executive producer, artistic director
- Enoch Zamuangana – rhythm guitar
- Shango Landu – rhythm guitar
- Omer Boanga – mi-solo guitar
- Jean-Marie Motingia – bass
- Oncle Bapius – bass
- Meridjo Belobi – drum
- Patcho Star – drum
- Célé Mbonda – percussion
- Alpha Kopeya – keyboards
- Claudio Pastecchia – keyboards
- Jean-Paul Kalko – mixing, mi-solo guitar, drum programming, additional animation
- Jean-Jacques Bayonne (credited as Wamaniola) – additional animation
- Joseph Najih – mixing
- Bruno Quinquet – recording engineer
