= Plaisir de l'Ouest Afrique =

Studio album by Zaïko Langa Langa
- Released: April 1976
- Studios: Essiebons, Accra, Ghana
- Genre: Congolese rumba
- Length: 36:37 (Vol. 1); 32:00 (Vol. 2)
- Label: Essiebons
- Producer: Henri Bowane

Zaïko Langa Langa chronology
Non Stop Dancing (1974)	Plaisir de l'Ouest Afrique (1976)	Tangi, Avis (1980)

Volume 2 cover

Plaisir de l'Ouest Afrique (also known as Plaisir De L'Ouest Afrique Vol. 1 and Vol. 2, or reissued as Zaire-Ghana) is a 1976 double album by the Congolese rumba band Zaïko Langa Langa. Recorded in Accra, Ghana, during a tour produced by guitarist Henri Bowane, it stands as the band's second LP and first double album and was released on the Ghanaian label Essiebons (catalog INLS 6116 for Vol. 1).

Plaisir de l'Ouest Afrique premiered just after their debut 33 rpm Non Stop Dancing (1974), following key line-up changes and during their rise as pioneers of the "third generation" of Congolese rumba. It showcased their lean, guitar-driven sound, the cavacha rhythm, energetic choir and sebene sections that distinguished them from earlier brass-heavy orchestras.

"Zaïko Wa Wa" quickly reached the top of the Ghanaian charts after its release.

== Background ==
Following the departure of Papa Wemba, Evoloko Jocker, Bozi Boziana, and Mavuela Somo in December 1974, many in the Kinshasa music press doubted whether Zaïko Langa Langa could survive. The split deprived the orchestra of their leading vocalists and most stage figures, particularly Evoloko Jocker, whose cavacha dance craze had become a cultural phenomenon across Central and East Africa. In response, the group launched a major rebuilding effort in early 1975 and recruited Likinga Redo from Empire Bakuba and Lengi Lenga (Ya Lengos) from Thu-Zaïna Mopwa. Together with N'Yoka Longo and Bimi Ombale, they formed a more disciplined and cohesive vocal section that replaced the earlier large ensemble format and would shape the group's celebrated "golden decade". During this period, Zaïko released important non-album singles such as "Mizou", "Yudasi", "Libota", "Lisapo", "Mbelengo", and "Elo", while also undertaking their first major tour of West Africa.

== Music ==
On Plaisir de l'Ouest Afrique, Zaïko Langa Langa combined love songs, self-referential pieces, urban themes, and outside musical influences. "Bomwana" ("Christine"), composed by N'Yoka Longo, dealt with youth romance and heartbreak, while "Saloti" (a re-make of the 1972 single "Charlotte Eshar") and "Ma" continued similar romantic themes. "Astrida", composed by Olemi Eshar, featured added horn arrangements by Henri Bowane after the group's stay in Accra, Ghana. "Zaïko Balawukidi" and "Zaïko Wa Wa", adapted or composed by Manuaku Waku, focused on praising the band itself, with the latter built around the repetitive "Zaïko wa-wa-wa" chorus sung by Redo and Lengos, alongside lead vocals by N'Yoka Longo. "Ngeli Ngeli" ("Kin Kiesse") composed by Matima, evoked Kinshasa from the perspective of a Kinois traveler missing his hometown. Plaisir de l'Ouest Afrique also included "Wabon'kum Blues", composed by Pierre Nkumu, an English-language R&B/soul recording and the first studio example of Zaïko's pop section.

== Track listing ==
=== Vol. 1 – INLS 6116 ===
Side one
No.	Title	Writer(s)	Length
1.	"Bomwana"	N'Yoka Longo	9:19
2.	"Astrida"	Olemi Eshar	9:35

Side two
No.	Title	Writer(s)	Length
1.	"Zaïko Wa Wa"	Félix Manuaku Waku	8:36
2.	"Saloti"	N'Yoka	9:15

=== Vol 2 – INLS 6117 ===
Side one
No.	Title	Writer(s)	Length
1.	"Ma"	N'Yoka Longo	9:17
2.	"Ngeli Ngeli"	Mbuta Matima	9:16

Side two
No.	Title	Writer(s)	Length
1.	"Zaïko Balawukidi"	Zaïko Langa Langa	8:36
2.	"Wabon'kum Blues"	Pierre Nkumu	4:12

== Personnel ==
- Jossart N'Yoka Longo – vocals
- Bimi Ombale – vocals
- Likinga Redo – vocals
- Lengi Lenga – vocals
- Pierre Nkumu – vocals (Wabon'kum Blues)
- Félix Manuaku Waku – guitar
- Mbuta Matima – guitar
- Enoch Zamuangana – rhythm guitar
- Teddy Sukami – rhythm guitar
- Bakunde Ilo Pablo – drums
