= ProZal =

- Founded: 1981; 45 years ago
- Founder: Zaïko Langa Langa
- Genre: Congolese rumba
- Country of origin: Democratic Republic of the Congo

ProZal, formally known as Production Zaïko Langa Langa, is a Congolese record label and production company associated with Zaïko Langa Langa created in 1981. It was created to provide the band with greater control over its musical production and distribution. Its roots go back to the band's earlier imprint, Éditions Langa Langa. During the 1980s, ProZal produced several key albums, collaborating with distributors such as N'Goss Production and SonoDisc.

After reduced activity in the 1990s, the label was revived in 2004, releasing Empreinte (2004), Rencontres (2007), and later works such as Sève (2019). ProZal remains active through digital platforms and reissues of Zaïko Langa Langa's catalog, which includes over 30 studio albums and several live and compilation releases.

== History ==
The origins of ProZal can be traced to Zaïko Langa Langa's early self-production efforts. The band launched Éditions Langa Langa in 1974 as an in-house imprint. This initiative allowed limited self-releases, though members continued to record under individual contracts with established Zairian labels such as Cover, Veve (Éditions Veve International), Moninga Star, Molende, and Salky throughout the 1970s.

ProZal was officially founded in 1981, with significant involvement from bandleader Jossart N'Yoka Longo. The label's name abbreviates Production Zaïko Langa Langa, reflecting its exclusive association with the band's recordings. Early releases included the 1981 LP Oka Biso!!! Tokangi Robinet!!!. During the mid-1980s, ProZal oversaw several of the band's key studio albums, including Funky (1982, co-labeled with CID), Zekete Zekete 2è Épisode (August 1983, co-labeled with Sonogravure), On Gagne Le Procès (1984, with Manglo Production), and Zaïko Eyi Nkisi (1985). Other releases from the same period include Tala Modèle Echanger (1985), produced by ProZal and distributed in Belgium by Safari Ambiance.

Between 1985 and 1987, as Gustave Ngossanga became the official sponsor of Zaïko Langa Langa, ProZal worked with distribution partners such as N'Goss Production in Africa, responsible for regional releases and concert logistics, and SonoDisc for Europe, the West Indies, North America, and Latin America. Many albums during this time were recorded in Brussels, including Eh Ngoss ! Eh Ngoss ! Eh Ngoss ! (early 1986), Pusa Kuna… Serrez ! Serrez ! (June 1986) and the highly acclaimed Nippon Banzai (December 1986), which followed the band's pioneering tour of Japan, the second Congolese group to perform there after Papa Wemba. Nippon Banzai sold over 100,000 copies, featured medley formats that influenced Congolese music, and earned the band the Georges Delerue Award in 1987 for tracks used in the film La Vie est Belle. Subsequent albums included Papa Omar (1987, with N'Goss Productions) and Subissez les Conséquences (1987, with SonoDisc).

ProZal released Ici Ça Va… Fungola Motema in 1990, but from 1991 to 2003, the label became largely inactive in major album productions, focusing on live performances and limited reissues. During this period, many earlier ProZal albums were reissued on CD by partners like Éditions Plus De Paris (e.g., Hits Inoubliables series from 1995 to 1997) and SonoDisc.

On 22 March 2004, ProZal's activitied restarted. The label collaborated with entities like WBE, Wedoo Music, and Atoll Music for releases such as Empreinte (2004, a CD/DVD set distributed with Atoll Music), Rencontres (2007), and Original Masters Volume 1: Zaïko Langa Langa (2007 compilation). The 2010s saw successful maxi-singles like Bande Annonce (2011) and Sisikaaaaaahh ! Moto na Moto na… (2014), reflecting a shift toward shorter formats amid digital trends. For the band's 50th anniversary, ProZal released the double album Sève in 2019.

Recent outputs include remastered versions of landmark albums, live albums such as Concert Dubaï Expo 2020 (2022) and Madeleine En Fête: Zaïko Langa Langa En Concert - 19 Mai 2024 (2024) and the EP Makinu (2025).
