= Tamaris (record label) =

- Founded: 1989
- Founder: Jean-Pierre Ngombé
- Defunct: 1998
- Status: Defunct
- Distributor: SonoDisc
- Genre: Congolese rumba
- Country of origin: Republic of the Congo
- Location: Brazzaville

Tamaris was a record label based in Congo-Brazzaville established by politician and cultural promoter Jean-Pierre Ngombé, active primarily between 1989 and the mid-1990s. Initially established as a book publishing house under the name Éditions Surya in 1984, the company rebranded as Tamaris in 1989, expanding into music production and distribution. The label supported renowned artists from the Congolese and African music scenes, producing iconic albums, and launching new talent.

== History ==
After retiring from politics in February 1979 to coincide with the rise to power of President Denis Sassou-Nguesso, Jean-Pierre Ngombé, a politician and cultural figure who studied alongside prominent musical acts such as Pamelo Mounk'a (Bantous de la Capitale), established a book publishing house under the name Éditions Surya ("sun" in sanskrit) in 1984. In 1989, it transitioned into a music label and was renamed Tamaris. The label's first release was the compilation album Tamaris Multi-Stars (1990), featuring artists like Pépé Kallé, M'Bilia Bel, Abby Surya, and Pompon Kuleta. The project included compositions by Dino Vangu, Papa Noël Nedule, and Ngombé himself (under the pseudonym “Akela Moleki”), with arrangements by Souzy Kaseya and lead guitar by Dino Vangu and Rigo Star.

The first studio album in their catalog, Hommage à Luambo Makiadi (1990) by TPOK Jazz, became a major success. Recorded between Brazzaville and Paris, it included the classic hit "Eau Bénite," composed by Simaro Lutumba. The accompanying music video was the most expensive production in the label's history. The label's catalog expanded to include subsequent releases from some of the era's most iconic acts, such as Jamais sans nous (1991) by Zaïko Langa Langa, The Flying Stars (1991) by Tshala Muana, Haut de gamme / Koweït, rive gauche (1992) by Koffi Olomide, L’amour au kilo (1992) by Mayaula Mayoni, and Exil Ley (1993) by Tabu Ley Rochereau.

In addition to these established acts, Tamaris played a key role in launching the careers of new artists. Abby Surya, whose stage name paid homage to the label’s original name, achieved success with her 1993 album Tant Pis Pour Toi. Pembey Sheiro released Explosion (1993), while Gatho Beevans, a young pop star from Zaire, debuted with a self-titled album in 1992, commonly referred to as Azalaki Awa. The label also signed other notable acts, including Choc Stars, Aicha Koné, Kim Douley, Mamie Claudia, and Elangui Aimé.

Tamaris albums were primarily marketed through its Top African Music shops, which operated in Congo, Zaire, Kenya, and France. These stores were overseen by Ngombé’s son, Eddy Ngombé, who joined the Tamaris team in 1992 to lead marketing efforts. The label’s reach was further enhanced by a 1992 distribution deal with the French company SonoDisc. Jean-Pierre Ngombé’s family played a significant role in the label’s operations, contributing to musical assistance, design and marketing.

By 1996, Tamaris had ceased active production, with one of its last projects being The Best of Tamaris, a two-volume compilation highlighting its iconic releases. This collection was reissued around 2003. While the label became less involved in production, it focused on distribution and maintained a commitment to ensuring royalties for its songwriters.

Jean-Pierre Ngombé continued to contribute to the cultural scene as director of the Festival Panafricain de Musique (FESPAM) starting in 1996. In 2009, he published a book titled Discours du pèlerin under Éditions Tamaris.

== Artists ==
- Abby Surya
- Aïcha Koné
- Choc Stars
- Doudou Copa
- Kim Douley
- Elangui Aimé
- Gatho Beevans
- Koffi Olomide and Quartier Latin International
- Mayaula Mayoni
- Mamie Claudia
- M'bilia Bel
- Nouvelle Génération
- TPOK Jazz
- Tshala Muana
- Pembey Sheiro
- Sam Mangwana
- Wenge Musica
- Zaïko Langa Langa
