= D. V. Moanda =

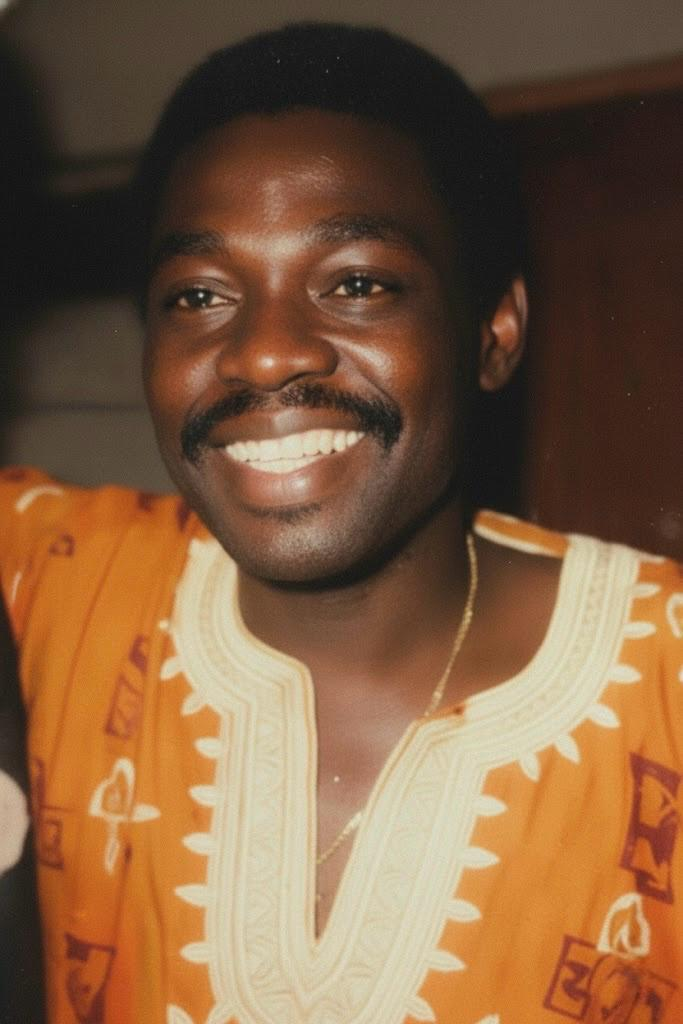

Background information
- Born: Vital Moanda di Veta; October 11, 1948
- Died: January 10, 1984 (aged 35)
- Instrument: Conga
- Years active: 1975–1982

Vital Moanda-di-Veta (born 11 October 1948 – 10 January 1984), known professionally as D. V. Moanda, was a prominent figure of Congolese music. He was best known for being one of the co-founders, alongside Henri Mongombe, Marcellin Delo and André Bita, of the influential Congolese rumba band Zaïko Langa Langa in December 1969.

Moanda grew up in a large family, being one of nine children. He studied at the Makala Technical School and later continued at Saint Jean Berchmans College.

Towards the late 1960s, he became an administrator of the band Bel Guide National. On December 23, 1969, Papa Wemba, a friend of the Mangaya cousins, approached a rehearsal of Bel Guide and sang accompanied by Manuaku on guitar. Moanda, impressed by Jules' performance, then decided to dissolve Bel Guide to form a new ensemble by keeping Wemba, Jossart N'Yoka Longo and Félix Manuaku Waku.

On the next day, December 24, around 3:00 p.m, a meeting took place in the home of the Mangaya family, in 10 Avenue Popo Kabaka, where D. V. Moanda, Henri Mongombe, Marcellin Delo and André Bita formed Zaïko Langa Langa. On the following days, several musicians joined the band, including Matima Mpiosso, Siméon Mavuela and Evoloko Jocker.

In 1975, Moanda briefly played congas for the band. During his time as a musician with the group, he also released four singles, including the track "Litima," which was released in October 1979.

Moanda was known for his creative promotional strategies for the band. He coined several names for Zaïko Langa Langa to use in competitions with other bands, such as "Tout Choc Anti Choc," "Nkolo Mboka," and "Familia Dei," which helped to solidify the band's identity and attract a loyal following.

== Death ==
Moanda died on January 10, 1984, due to liver cirrhosis. He was survived by his five children: Freddy Moanda, Dany Moanda, Peter Moanda, Michelle "Mimi" Moanda and Serge Mbemba Moanda.
