= Nippon Banzai =

Studio album by Zaïko Langa Langa
- Released: 1986
- Studios: ICP Studios, Brussels
- Genre: Congolese rumba
- Length: 32:55
- Label: ProZal

Zaïko Langa Langa chronology
Pusa Kuna… Serrez ! Serrez ! (1986)	Nippon Banzai (1986)	Papa Omar (1987)

Singles from Nippon Banzai
- 1. ""Muvaro" / "Sandra Lina"" Released: 1988

Nippon Banzai is a 1986 studio album by Congolese band Zaïko Langa Langa, released on their ProZal label. The album followed band's pioneering tour of Japan in October 1986, positioning them as the second Congolese musical collective to perform in the country, after Papa Wemba and his band Viva La Musica, who had toured Japan earlier that same year.

Nippon Banzai is widely regarded as Zaïko Langa Langa's most significant artistic and commercial success, propelling the band to unprecedented international recognition across regions including Europe and the West Indies. The tracklisting of Nippon Banzai serves as an auditory representation of the band's live performances during their Japanese tour.

In 1987, Zaïko Langa Langa was awarded the Georges Delerue Award for Best Music at the Flanders International Film Festival in Ghent following the inclusion of their breakout tracks "Muvaro" and "Sandra Lina" in the 1987 film La Vie est Belle.

== Background ==
In October 1986, Zaïko Langa Langa embarked on their groundbreaking Japanese tour, becoming the only second group from Zaire to achieve this feat, (after Papa Wemba and Viva La Musica in May of the same year). Performing at prestigious venues in Tokyo, Osaka and Sapporo, the group received an effusive reception from Japanese audiences. Papa Wemba and Zaïko Langa Langa's tours also catalyzed the formation of Yoka Choc, a collective of Japanese musicians dedicated to performing Congolese rumba.

== Concept and recording ==
The concept for Nippon Banzai was envisioned by Joss Bokken, who sought to encapsulate the band's Japanese tour experience in a commercially viable format. Inspired by the success of their performances, Bokken proposed a medley-style album (cutting songs short to aim at an international audience) that would feature both classic hits from the late 1970s—such as "Sentiment Awa", "Kin Kiesse", and "Sangela"—with contemporary hits from the 1980s, including "Muvaro", "Liwa Yo Moyibi", and "SVP Mbey". Initially met with skepticism from other band members, the concept eventually garnered acceptance, and recording commenced after the tour concluded in late 1986. The album features 12 tracks in a continuous medley format, enhanced by the synthesizer contributions of Malukisa. Asserting Nippon Banzai's significance, N'Yoka Longo stated that the album was conceived specifically to counter allegations of the band's decline, stating, "to prove to our critics that we had not gone into oblivion". The album emphasized atalaku—the evocative use of spirited vocalizations, percussive rhythms, and resonant chants. Nono Monzuluku and Bébé Atalaku imbued the tracks with dynamic catchphrases while enlivening the music with their animated dance movements.

== Cover ==
The flag of Japan is slightly modified on the album cover (the red circle appears sliced).

Nippon Banzai's album cover is revered as one of the most iconic in African and Congolese music. Designed by Joss Bokken and Jacques Duquesne, the cover appears to draw inspiration from the Japanese flag. It features the band members, depicted from left to right: Jossart N'Yoka Longo, Bimi Ombale, Dindo Yogo, and Lengi Lenga.

== Commercial performance and impact ==
Upon its release, Nippon Banzai swiftly gained widespread acclaim and commercial success, transcending geographical boundaries to resonate with audiences across Africa, the West Indies, Europe, and notably, Japan. The album sold over 100,000 copies, firmly establishing Zaïko Langa Langa as an international musical force. Among its standout tracks, "Sentiment Awa", "Sandra Lina", "Muvaro" emerged as definitive highlights. While the album narrowly missed earning gold certification in France, it faced challenges from pirated versions that proliferated in the market. Nonetheless, Nippon Banzai played a pivotal role in globalizing Congolese rumba, with the genre occasionally referred to as "du Zaïko" in various African regions.

The album's medley format became a defining characteristic of Congolese music, inspiring subsequent releases by notable artists such as Franco Luambo's Animation Non Stop (1987), Tabu Ley Rochereau's Soum Djoum/Afrisa de L'an 2000 (1989), and Wenge Musica's Wenge Live (1989), among others. Prior to Nippon Banzai, Zaïko Langa Langa had experimented with medleys on previous albums, including La Tout Neige, Christine, Nalali Mpongui (1983), as well as Jetez l'éponge (1989).

=== TF1 performance ===
Despite rejections of previous albums due to mixing and mastering rules, Zaïko Langa Langa's submission of Nippon Banzai to TF1 in 1987 was finally accepted. The band appeared on Christophe Dechavanne's show Panique sur la 16, where they performed "Sandra Lina" and "Muvaro", making it the first appearance of a Congolese group on TF1.

== In popular culture ==
The songs "Muvaro" and "Sandra Lina" were featured in the soundtrack of the 1987 film La Vie est Belle starring Papa Wemba, for which they won the Georges Delerue Award for Best Soundtrack/Sound Design at the Flanders-Ghent International Film Festival. "Toyambana" is also heard in a scene in the film.

== Track listing ==
Side one
No.	Title	Writer(s)	Length
1.	"Sentiment Awa"	N'Yoka Longo	3:27
2.	"Sandra Lina"	Bimi Ombale	2:31
3.	"Muvaro"	Nsumbu Lengi Lenga	2:37
4.	"Liwa Yo Moyibi"	Dindo Yogo	2:34
5.	"Toyambana"	Oncle Bapius	3:03
6.	"Sangela"	Meridjo Belobi	2:29

Side two
No.	Title	Writer(s)	Length
1.	"Kin Kiesse"	Mbuta Matima	2:38
2.	"Masela"	Matima	3:05
3.	"Antalia"	Likinga Redo	3:32
4.	"SVP Mbey"	N'Yoka Longo	2:03
5.	"Fonsi"	Enoch Zamuangana	2:02
6.	"Kamango"	Nsumbu Lengi Lenga	3:08

=== CD version (1988) ===
CD version
No.	Title	Writer(s)	Length
1.	"Sentiment Awa"	N'Yoka Longo	3:27
2.	"Sandra Lina"	Bimi Ombale	2:31
3.	"Muvaro"	Nsumbu Lengi Lenga	2:37
4.	"Liwa Yo Moyibi"	Dindo Yogo	2:34
5.	"Toyambana"	Oncle Bapius	3:03
6.	"Sangela"	Meridjo Belobi	2:29
7.	"Kin Kiesse"	Mbuta Matima	2:38
8.	"Masela"	Matima	3:05
9.	"Antalia"	Likinga Redo	3:32
10.	"SVP Mbey"	N'Yoka Longo	2:03
11.	"Fonsi"	Enoch Zamuangana	2:02
12.	"Kamango"	Nsumbu Lengi Lenga	3:08
13.	"Nibe"	Bimi Ombale	8:06
14.	"Lisumu"	Zamuangana	7:26
15.	"Kevalina"	JP Buse	7:26
16.	"Moyen Te"	Beniko Popolipo	7:26

Note: Last 4 tracks are taken from 1987 LP "Subissez les Conséquences".

== Personnel ==
- Jossart N'Yoka Longo – vocals
- Bimi Ombale – vocals
- Lengi Lenga – vocals
- JP Buse – vocals
- Dindo Yogo – vocals
- Nono Monzuluku – animation, shaker
- Bébé Atalaku – animation, shaker
- Mbuta Matima – guitar, artistic direction
- Enoch Zamuangana – guitar
- Petit Poisson – guitar
- Jimmy Yaba – guitar, artistic direction
- Beniko Popolipo – guitar
- Oncle Bapius – bass guitar
- José Piano-Piano – synthesizer
- Meridjo Belobi – drums
- Bakunde Ilo Pablo – drums
- Djerba Mandjeku – congas
