= Bakunde Ilo Pablo =

Congolese drummer (1951–2011)

- Born: Bakunde Ilondjoko; 5 January 1951 (age 75); Kinshasa, DR Congo
- Died: 20 September 2011 (aged 60) Kinshasa, DR Congo
- Genre: Congolese rumba · jazz · pop
- Occupations: Drummer; singer-songwriter
- Instruments: Drums; vocals
- Years active: 1971–1994

Bakunde Ilondjoko (5 January 1951 – 20 September 2011), known as Bakunde Ilo Pablo, was a Congolese drummer and singer-songwriter best known for being a long-time member of Zaïko Langa Langa. His drumming was characterized by his powerful hitting and mastery of the hi-hat.

== Early career and musical debut ==
Paul Bakunde Ilondjoko was born on 5 January 1951, in Kinshasa (then-called Léopoldville) in the Democratic Republic of Congo.

He attended primary school at the Sainte-Marie school in the commune of Lingwala. He received his secondary education at the Athénée de la Gombe (then-called Kalina). Pablo's interest in music blossomed, with a fascination for jazz and pop music during his formative years and through his early exposure to artists like Johnny Hallyday and Claude François. His debut into music composition came in 1965 with his song "Oiseau De L'Amour," inspired by a personal romantic experience. Despite his interest in jazz and pop, he transitioned to Congolese music in 1971, spurred by an invitation to join the orchestra Les Corsaires by his friend Oscar Diabanza. Subsequently, he journeyed through various musical groups, including Chem Chem Yetu and Orchestre Stukas, where he released his first single, "Mangenge".

== Prominence ==
In 1974, he joined Zaïko Langa Langa to replace Meridjo Belobi, their main drummer, who was imprisoned in Ekafela. They shared the post after his release. He had known them long before, rehearsing with their guitarist Mbuta Matima when he was in the band's pop section. His debut song with the band, "Ndonge," recorded at Johnny Bokelo's recording studio and released in November 1974, emerged as a monumental hit, marking the onset of a flourishing career. Subsequent releases such as "Ando," "Eboza," "Mangobo," "Feti," and "Matata" solidified his stature as a distinguished songwriter in the band.

In 1978, he was part of the delegation of Zaïko Langa Langa musicians on the band's first European tour, at the invitation of the JMPR (Jeunesse du Mouvement Populaire de Révolution). Pablo shined in 1984 with the release of his first solo album, "Rencontre," featuring Bozi Boziana on lead vocals. This album showcased "Azo," a studio rendition of his initial composition, "Oiseau De L'Amour." In 1985, alongside bandmate Meridjo Belobi, Pablo pioneered the technique of double-drumming in Congolese rumba.

1988's month of May witnessed a leadership dispute within Zaïko Langa Langa led to the formation of Zaïko Langa Langa Familia Dei, with Pablo as a prominent member. Their eponymous debut album, released in December 1989, featured the classic hit "L'Oiseau Rare," another rendition of Pablo's debut composition, which garnered international acclaim. At the same time, he became president of UMUZA (Union des musiciens zaïrois), succeeding Franco Luambo following his death.

Throughout the 1990s, Pablo continued releasing solo albums such as "Songa Fiele" (1990) and "Kenya Safari" (1991). His contributions continued within Zaïko Langa Langa Familia Dei, with compositions like the titular track of the album "Au Revoir Prince" (1991) and "Les Riches et Les Pauvres" (1992) from their third album, "Bako Bandela."

== Later years and death ==
In 1994, Bakunde Ilo Pablo withdrew from the music scene, redirecting his focus towards other endeavors. However, he later started hosting a radio show titled "Bana Léo."

He died on the morning of 20 September 2011 at the age of 60 in Kinshasa, at the Candeur polyclinic in the commune of Limete.

== Discography ==
=== Solo albums ===
- Rencontre (1984)
- Songa Fiele (1990)
- Kenya Safari (1991)

=== As a band member ===
==== Zaïko Langa Langa ====
===== Albums =====
- Plaisir de l'Ouest Afrique (double album, 1976)
- Nkolo Mboka (double album, 1982)
- L'Orchestre de tous les Âges (1983)
- Muvaro/Etape (1983)
- On Gagne le Procès (1984)
- Tout-Choc Anti-Choc Zaïko Langa Langa en Europe (1984)
- Oldies And Goodies (compilation album, 1985)
- Zaïko Eyi Nkisi (1985)
- Tala Modèle Echanger (1985)
- Eh Ngoss! Eh Ngoss! Eh Ngoss! (1986)
- Pusa Kuna... Serrez Serrez! (1986)
- Nippon Banzai (1986)
- Papa Omar (1987)
- Subissez les Conséquences (1987)

===== Singles =====
Release date	Title	Label	Format
November 1974	"Ndonge"	Mara	45 rpm
November 1974	"Ando"	Mara	45 rpm
26 August 1975	"Eboza"	Matabisi	45 rpm
23 February 1976	"Alekanda"	Alamoule	45 rpm
1977	"Lokolo Ya Mama Mapasa"	Langa-Langa	45 rpm
April 1977	"Libota"	Langa-Langa	45 rpm
August 1977	"Matata"	Mara	45 rpm
30 December 1977	"Feti"	Ashakana	45 rpm
1978	"Chérie Lobo"	B.I.P. Inter	45 rpm
12 May 1978	"Mangobo"	B.I.P. Inter	45 rpm

==== Zaïko Langa Langa Familia Dei ====
- Zaïko Langa Langa F.D. (often referred as L'Oiseau Rare, 1989)
- Au Revoir Prince (1991)
- Bako Bandela (1992)
