= Zaïko Langa Langa =

Congolese band

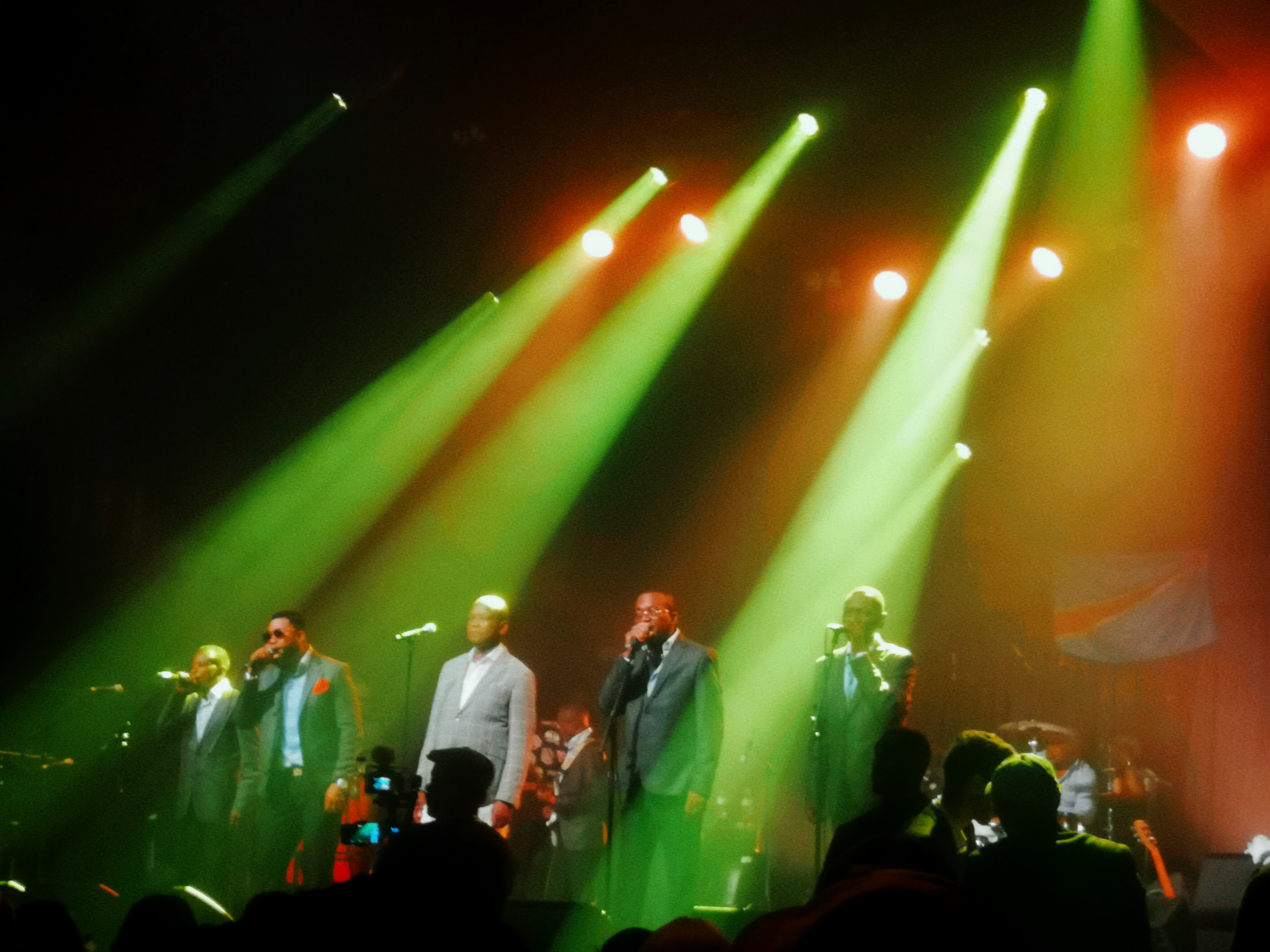
- Zaïko Langa Langa in Brussels in 2024

Background information
- Also known as: Zaïko Langa Langa Nkolo Mboka
- Origin: Kinshasa, Democratic Republic of the Congo
- Genre: Congolese rumba
- Works: Albums and singles
- Years active: 1969–present
- Labels: ProZal (Production Zaïko Langa Langa); Zaire Music; Éditions Veve International; N'Goss; SonoDisc; Sonima; JPS
- Members: (See Band members section)
- Website: zaikolangalanga.org

Zaïko Langa Langa, also known as Zaïko Langa Langa Nkolo Mboka, is a Congolese rumba band formed in Kinshasa in December 1969. Widely regarded as one of the most influential bands in modern Congolese and African popular music, the band was established by D.V. Moanda, Henri Mongombe, Marcellin Delo, and André Bita, emerging from the Orchestre Bel Guide National, which is considered its direct precursor. Zaïko Langa Langa reshaped Congolese rumba by abandoning the single-bandleader model in favor of a collective of co-founders, before ultimately transitioning to centralized leadership under Jossart N'Yoka Longo since 1981. The band became an emblem of Kinshasa's urban youth and the Congolese diaspora, inspired by the Belgicains, 1960s Congolese student bands in Belgium.

Listed as part of the Democratic Republic of the Congo's cultural heritage, Zaïko Langa Langa has contributed to the evolution and innovation of Congolese rumba during the 1970s, popularizing distinctive elements including variances in percussive pacing, snare drum utilization (cavacha rhythm), the sebene guitar technique, and a performance assemblage comprising atalaku, a harmonized choir, and a soloist. The band has been a breeding ground for prominent artists like Papa Wemba, Félix Manuaku Waku, Bozi Boziana, Dindo Yogo, and Evoloko Jocker, who went on to establish successful careers. Zaïko Langa Langa has spun off several groups consisting of groups or factions of former members, including Isifi Lokole, Viva La Musica, Langa Langa Stars, Zaïko Langa Langa Familia Dei, Anti Choc, Choc Stars, Quartier Latin International, and many others. By 1973, Zaïko Langa Langa was heralded as the trailblazer of the third generation of Congolese rumba due to their divergence from the brass-heavy orchestral sound of their predecessors in favor of a leaner, guitar-driven style. Their infusion of contemporary elements revitalized the genre and positioned them as the "mother of all internationally known Congolese orchestras since 1970", while their energetic stage presence and independence from established musical mentors placed them at the forefront of la nouvelle vague (the new wave) of musique zaïroise.

Throughout their five-decade career, Zaïko Langa Langa has recorded officially 30 albums and three maxi-singles. (Note: Other records recorded by band members, often with additional session musicians—a practice known in the Congo as "nzonzing" (moonlighting)—have been credited to Zaïko Langa Langa but are not considered part of the band's official discography.) Landmark recordings include Zekete Zekete 2e Épisode (1983), the first album to feature an atalaku, and Nippon Banzai (1986), its most commercially successful release. In the 1990s, the band maintained its relevance with albums such as Ici Ça Va… Fungola Motema (1990), Jamais Sans Nous (1991), and Avis de Recherche (1995).

Due to several schisms within the group, the Clan Langa Langa was formed, consolidating all dissenting factions from the original Zaïko fold, including Viva La Musica, Isifi Lokole, Choc Stars, Langa Langa Stars, Quartier Latin.

== Etymology ==
Henri Mongombe recounts that the band's name was chosen on the day it was formed, with various proposals on the table: André Bita suggested Africana, while D.V. Moanda and Mongombe favored retaining Makina Loka. Marcellin Delo then introduced Zaïco, which was immediately preferred for its appealing sound and provisionally adopted. However, it was later discovered that Zaïco was a registered trademark belonging to the leader of another short-lived Brussels-based Congolese band. To preserve the name's appeal while avoiding legal conflict, Mongombe proposed modifying it to Zaïko.

According to Paris-based Congolese journalist Marie-Louise Mumbu, Zaïko is a contraction of "Zaïre ya bankoko", meaning "the Zaire River of our ancestors", a reference tied to the era of early exploration and the navigator Diego Caô, who is credited with discovering what is now the Congo River. Although the name was initially interpreted as "Zaïre du Kongo", it was later revised to "Zaïre ya bankoko". The nickname Langa Langa, derived from a medicinal plant native to Papa Wemba's home region of Kasaï, was subsequently added, which then formed the band's full name, Zaïko Langa Langa.

== History ==
=== 1968–1970: Formation ===
==== From Bel Guide National to Zaïko Langa Langa ====
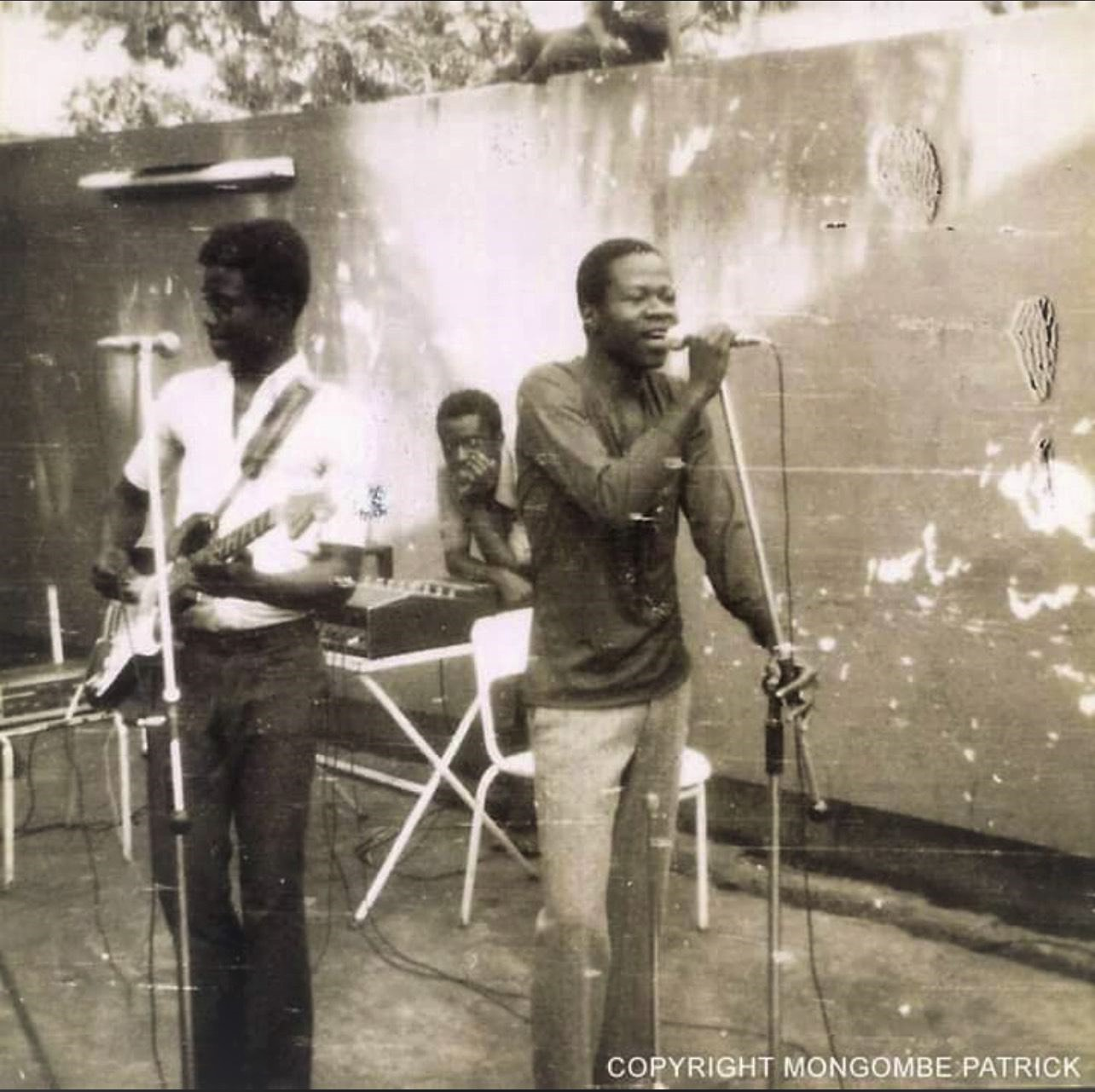
Félix Manuaku Waku and Jules Presley in 1972.

Active since 1969, the youth group Bel Guide National was founded by flutist Perzy Nzinga. The group brought together Jossart N'Yoka Longo, Baguin and Charles Tchadé as singers, Félix Manuaku Waku as lead guitarist, having replaced Gégé Mangaya, who had left to join Thu-Zaïna; Athos Sita on rhythm guitar; and Back and Ladji Milandu as bass players. Its administrative committee consisted of D. V. Moanda, Henri Mongombe, Marcellin Delo, André Bita and Teddy Sukami.

On December 23, 1969, Jules Shungu Wembadio, then known by his stage name Jules Presley (became Papa Wemba in 1975) and a close friend of the Mitshio brothers, was brought by the latters to visit their aunt and he later attended a rehearsal of the group which took place in their backyard. During the session, he performed a song accompanied on guitar by Manuaku Waku. Impressed by his performance, the leaders of Bel Guide decided to dissolve the group and form a new orchestra with Jules.

The following day, December 24, at around 3 p.m., a meeting was held at the Mangaya family home, located at 10 Avenue Popo Kabaka in the Kasa-Vubu commune. D. V. Moanda, Henri Mongombe, Marcellin Delo and André Bita announced the dissolution of Bel Guide and officially established Zaïko Langa Langa. As part of the reorganization, Manuaku Waku was retained. Teddy Sukami, who was then an apprentice guitarist under Manuaku and Gégé Mangaya, was also involved in the new formation. Jossart N'Yoka Longo, who was assisting at a Thu-Zaïna concert at the time, was informed of the decision.

The very first rehearsal of the band took place on December 25. Manuaku and Jules were joined by Enoch Zamuangana, a former member of Bel Guide National who happened to be passing by. He took part in the session as a guitarist and subsequently joined the orchestra. In the days that followed, several other musicians joined the group, including bassists Damien Ndebo and Oncle Bapius, guitarist Matima Mpioso, later nicknamed Mbuta Matima by Papa Wemba; and singers Charles Tchadé, Mavuela Somo and Evoloko Jocker.

The group was initially divided into two distinct sections: a "typical" section and a "pop" section. Jules Shungu Wembadio, Jossart N'Yoka Longo, Evoloko Jocker, Mavuela Somo, Alfred Mandala and Dieudonné Tunisien were the singers, with the latter two belonging to the pop section. The instrumentalists included Félix Manuaku Waku, Enoch Zamuangana, Teddy Sukami, Damien Ndebo, Oncle Bapius and Zéphyrin Matima Mpioso on guitars, with Mpioso belonging to the pop section, Baudouin Mitshio on drums, and Ephraim on congas.

On March 24, 1970, Zaïko Langa Langa gave its first concert at Bar Dancing Hawai. Later that month, the group recorded several tracks for Polydor and released the single "Mosinzo Nganga" with "Pauline" as the B-side. The two songs were composed respectively by Teddy Sukami and Jules Presley Shungu. Jossart also released one of his early compositions, "La Tout Neige", which became the group's first major hit, with "Francine Keller" on the B-side. The musical style of the Belgicain band Los Nickelos, which had influenced Zaïko Langa Langa, was particularly evident in the band's early recordings.

Alfred Mandala and Dieudonné Tunisien soon left the group. Mandala went to Europe, while Dieudonné Tunisien joined the army. They were immediately replaced by Samuel-Dieudonné Nzolantima, known as Mbuta Mashakado, and Pierre Nkumu. Also in March 1970, drummer Bimi Ombale joined Zaïko Langa Langa's pop section. During this period, the group remained based in the Kasa-Vubu commune.

=== 1971–1976: Rise and first tour ===
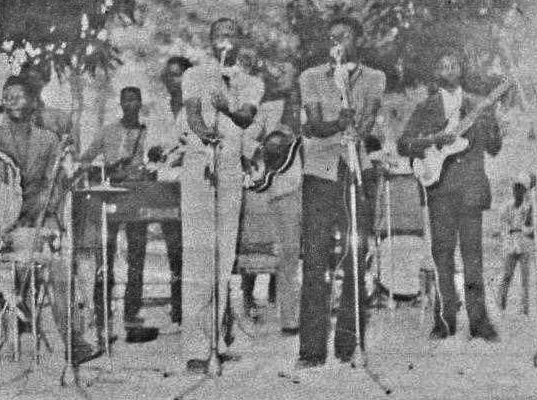
Performance in 1970. From left to right: Beaudoin Mitsho, Enoch Zamuangana (behind), Teddy Sukami, Papa Wemba, Damien Ndebo (behind), Evoloko Jocker, Félix Manuaku Waku

==== First line-up changes and innovations ====
One of Zaïko Langa Langa's pioneering innovations was the excision of the horn section from their compositions, diverging from the prevailing format favored by contemporaries like TPOK Jazz. This stylistic shift helped establish the third wave of Congolese rumba, following the first generation of artists like Wendo Kolosoy and the second generation of ensemble bands such as TPOK Jazz and African Jazz. Between 1971 and 1974, Zaïko Langa Langa experienced significant growth, releasing over fifty singles. In 1971, a dispute arose when Bimi Ombale expressed interest in transitioning from drummer to vocalist. Facing internal resistance, he temporarily left to join Tony Dee Bokito Bokoma's Tabou National, only to return months later as a singer. In the month of June, Meridjo Belobi, a former student at the Institut Supérieur des Techniques Appliquées (ISTA) in Barumbu, was recruited as a conga player. His proximity to the band's rehearsal space at Hôtel Azur facilitated his involvement, and with the endorsement of D.V. Moanda, Belobi became the official drummer, following Ombale's brief departure. Vocalist Jean-Pierre Efongé Isekofeta, known as Gina wa Gina, also joined in 1971.

Bapius instituted a novel bass-playing style named trombone or kindobika that differed from the band's antecedent influences. According to himself, he was inspired by traditional Kongo music and dances he performed as a boy scout. Efonge gained acclaim after his song "Consolation", released in 1972, became a hit. Meridjo switched from congas to drums, after Ombale's departure. The pop section's soloist, Mbuta Matima, transitioned to the typical section. During this period, Zaïko Langa Langa became one of Zaïre's premier bands, and Jules Presley adopted the stage name Papa Wemba. Shortly after, they joined Verckys' emblematic label, Éditions Vévé.

==== Cavacha, first awards and Plaisir De L'Ouest Afrique ====
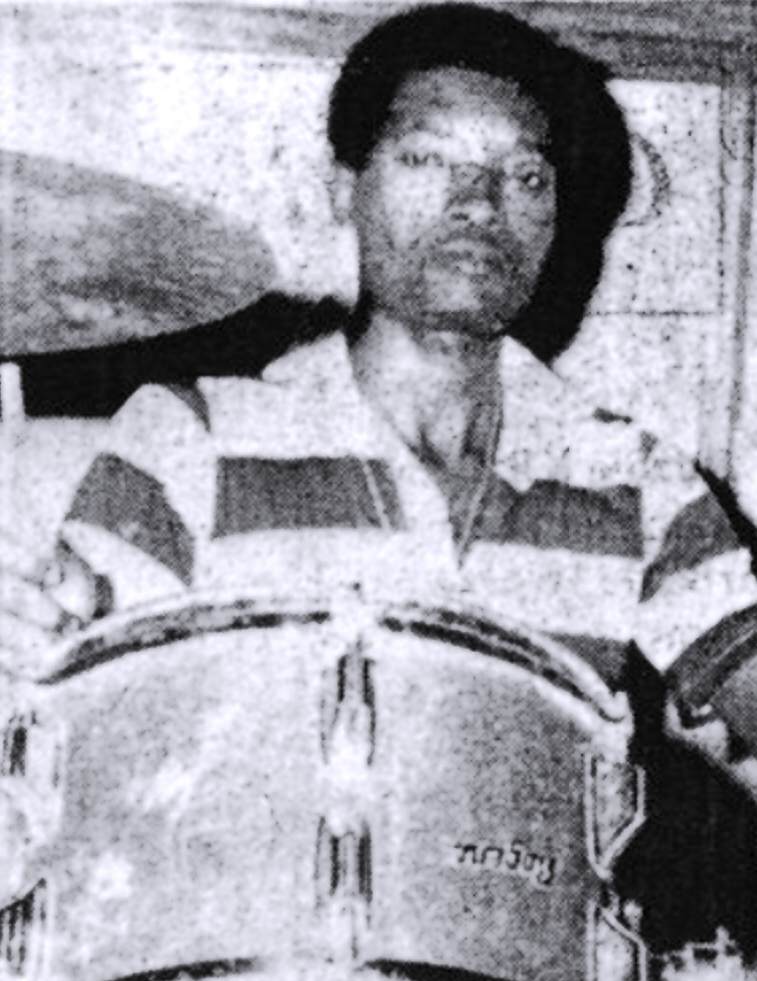
Meridjo Belobi in 1979

In 1971, during the band's first trip outside Zaire, the musicians traveled by train from Brazzaville to Pointe-Noire. Meridjo accompanied their singing using only his drumsticks. Inspired by the train's rhythm and encouraged by Evoloko Jocker and Mbuta Mashakado, Belobi later replicated the rhythmic cadence on the drum kit in Kinshasa, leading to the invention of the cavacha beat. The style, characterized by rapid snare and hi-hat work, gained popularity across Central, East, and West Africa, and extended to Europe and Latin America.

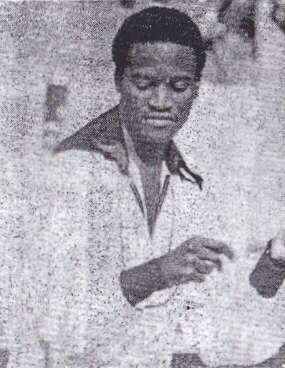
Jossart N'Yoka Longo in 1979

Cavacha also became associated with a dance introduced by Evoloko, which similarly gained popularity across Africa. The band developed variations such as the cavacha tambour, cavacha mondial, and cavacha wondostock, the latter a nod to the hippie spirit of Woodstock Rock Festival, reimagined by the musicians in Lingala as "Wondostock". Zaïko Langa Langa capitalized on this trend by releasing a series of landmark singles. In mid-1974, Meridjo was arrested and imprisoned in Ekafela Prison with a 21-month sentence. In the wake of this misfortune, Bakunde Ilo Pablo, the drummer from Stukas, was recruited to temporarily replace Belobi. Shortly after his inclusion, Bakunde achieved a high level of success following the release of his compositions, "Ndonge" and "Ando", which were issued as singles. During this same period, Bozi Boziana joined the band, stepping in for Gina Efonge, who was struggling with depression. On 22 September 1974, Zaïko Langa Langa participated in the Zaire 74 music festival, performing alongside TPOK Jazz, James Brown, Miriam Makeba, Etta James, Fania All-Stars, Tabu Ley Rochereau, Orchestre Stukas, Manu Dibango, Bill Withers, The J.B.'s, B. B. King, Sister Sledge, Abeti Masikini, and The Spinners, among others. Their set, which opened the festival, lasted 45 minutes. That same year saw the release of Zaïko Langa Langa's debut LP, Non Stop Dancing, featuring six tracks, including the smash hits "Eluzam" and "Mbeya Mbeya". "Eluzam", in particular, was praised for the ingenuity of Félix Manuaku Waku's guitar work. Rejecting fixed tonal patterns, Manuaku adapted his playing to match the phrasing of each vocalist, often making instinctive choices, such as beginning solos in D rather than G major, that would come to characterize band's distinctive sound.

In December 1974, Zaïko Langa Langa survived its first split. Papa Wemba, Evoloko Jocker, Bozi Boziana and Mavuela Somo left and formed Isifi Lokole. This offshoot would later disband as well, giving rise to Yoka Lokole, which Wemba will later leave to form Viva La Musica in December 1976. That year, Zaïko Langa Langa received two awards: Best Orchestra of Zaire and Best Star of the Year, the latter awarded to Evoloko Jocker. "Mizou" was one of the band's debut singles, which premiered in early 1975. To fill the void left by the members of Isifi Lokole, singers Likinga Redo and Lengi Lenga Nsumbu joined the band. Mbuta Mashakado changes from pop section to typical. During the latter half of 1975, Zaïko Langa Langa released the singles "Eboza", "Yudasi", and "Elo", all of which met with considerable acclaim, especially the highly successful "Elo".

In late 1975, under the production of prominent guitarist Henri Bowane, Zaïko Langa Langa embarked on a month-and-a-half-long tour in Ghana, where they recorded their second LP and first double album, titled Plaisir De L'Ouest Afrique, at Studio Essiebons. Plaisir De L'Ouest Afrique was later remastered and reissued as Zaire-Ghana in 1993. "Zaïko Wa Wa" quickly rose to the top of the Ghanaian charts. They also toured in Togo as part of the same tour. In 1976, Félix Manuaku Waku joins Ray Lema, Bopol Mansiamina and many others to form an offshoot band, Les Ya Toupas du Zaïre. After they returned to Kinshasa, Mashakado departed from the band to join Yoka Lokole, while Gina Efonge made a triumphant return after overcoming depression (although he left in 1977 to establish his band TP Libanko). Meridjo Belobi rejoined Zaïko Langa Langa following his release from prison.

=== 1977–1979: Pre-golden era ===
==== FESTAC 77 participation and tenth anniversary ====
Bozi Boziana and Mbuta Mashakado have reintegrated into Zaïko Langa Langa, after the failure of Yoka Lokole. Manuaku Waku, N'Yoka Longo, Likinga Redo and Mashakado were selected by Tabu Ley Rochereau to join the National Orchestra of Zaire (ONAZA). They participate as band members at FESTAC 77 in Lagos. Numerous singles were released in early 1977, including Bimi Ombale's "Ima", in which Manuaku Waku uses the bouzouki for the very first time in Congolese rumba. The instrument was later stolen and never seen again.

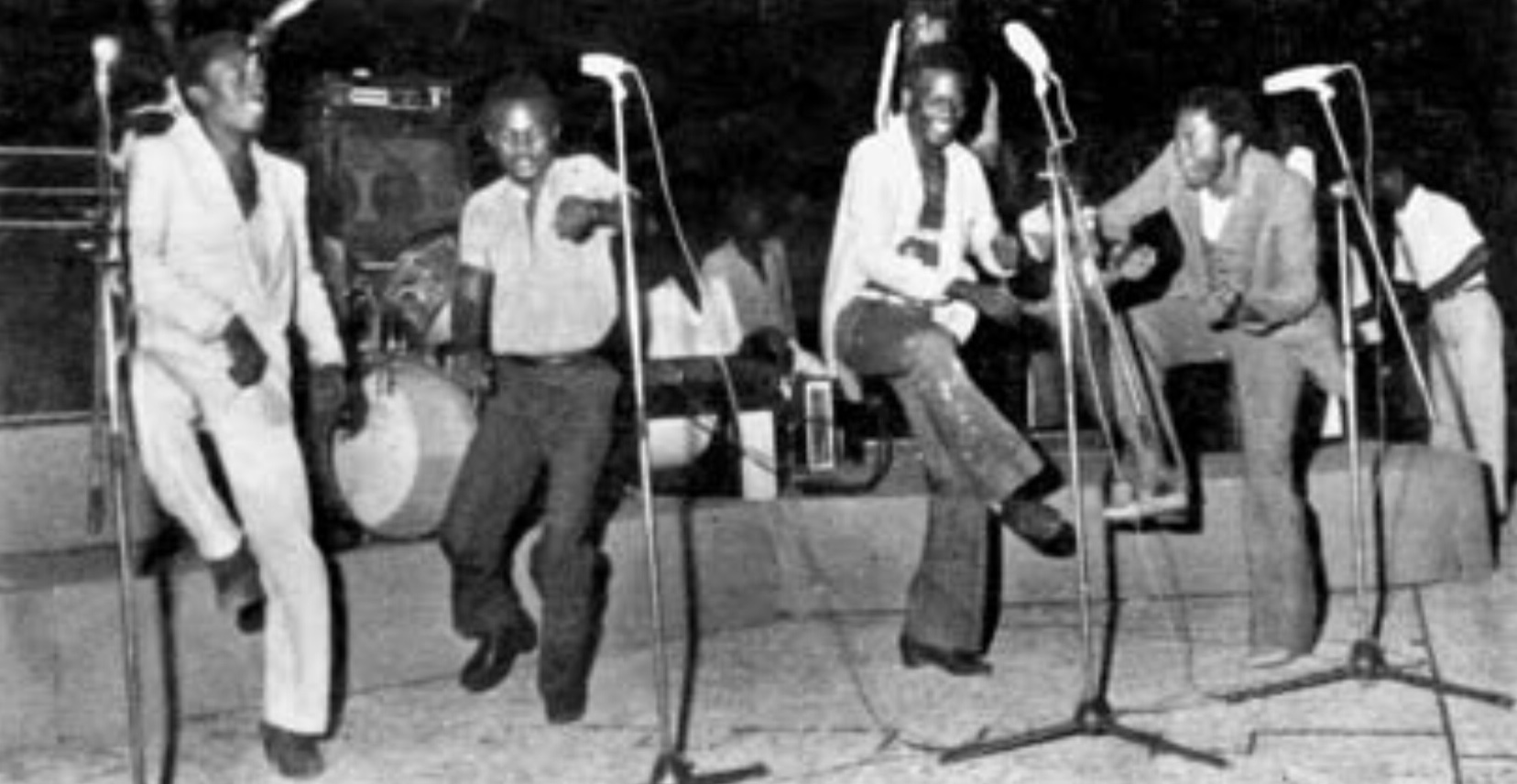
Zaïko Langa Langa performing in Kinshasa, ca. 1979

Upon his return, Belobi released the single "Sangela", marking his comeback with the group. He plays alternately with Pablo. Boziana also garners recognition with the release of his hit singles "Diana Ya Mama", "Bibichana" and "Toutou". According to co-founder Henri Mongombe, he was living in Europe at the time and later learned from band members that, following discussions among the founders, D.V. Moanda allegedly amended the group's statutes after the other three founders had left. These changes reportedly recognized Moanda as the sole founder and registered the band's name as his exclusive trademark.

In early 1978, Zaïko Langa Langa recorded several songs at the RENAPEC studio in Kinshasa. These songs were released as standalone songs throughout the year, including "Pacha Labaran", "Mystère", "Likamuisi" and "Belingo" (a new version of "Ndendeli"). In mid-1978, Zaïko Langa Langa had made its first European tour, accompanied by a JMPR delegation.

Teddy Sukami created an offshoot band called Les Casques Bleus. The band lineup had included Lengi-Lenga and Yenga Yenga Junior. The latter joins the band as Likinga's understudy, since they have extremely similar voices. Sukami released the song "Bongo Bouger" with this group in June 1978. The single was certified gold by SONECA. Zaïko Langa Langa recorded N'Yoka Longo's hit "Sentiment Awa" for the first time towards the end of the year. Evoloko Jocker rejoined the band after the failure of Isifi Lokole. In December 1979, Zaïko Langa Langa celebrated 10 years of existence. In March 1980, the group marked its tenth anniversary with a ten-day celebration featuring guest performances by fellow major Kinshasa bands.

=== 1980–1989: Golden decade ===
==== Manuaku's departure, from Gitta Production Présente Le Tout-Choc Zaïko Langa Langa to Funky ====
During the first trimester of 1980, Manuaku's hit "Obi" was released. In September 1980, a mass revocation of many members, led to several disputes between Manuaku Waku and other members of the band. He left with Cheikdan Mbuku, Mbuta Sanza, Otis Mbuta and Djudjuchet Luvengoka to form Grand Zaïko Wawa. Months later, towards the end of the year, singer JP Buse, soloists Petit Poisson Avedila and Roxy Tshimpaka joined the band. They also released the hit "Fièvre Mondo", composed by Evoloko Jocker, which was awarded Best Song of the Year. Apart from this song, the singles "Solomo", "Amitié", "Viya" and "Crois-Moi" were also issued. With the exception of "Amitié", the recordings were compiled in 1983 by Verckys Kiamuangana Mateta on the LP L'Orchestre de tous les âges.

Zaïko Langa Langa's third LP, entitled Gitta Production Présente Le Tout-Choc Zaïko Langa Langa, debuted in 1981 and contained four songs. It was recorded during an exhaustive 8-song session at Studio Igloo (formerly Studio Caramel) in Brussels after the VISA 80 European tour launched by Franco Luambo, which was the third tour in the zone for the band. Teddy Sukami, then president of the group, had left Zaïko Langa Langa during this tour. Jossart N'Yoka Longo, his vice-president, assumed the presidency immediately. In September of that year, Evoloko Jocker, Bozi Boziana, Djo Mali Bolenge and Petit Cachet Ndjoli left to establish Langa Langa Stars, supported by producer Verckys Kiamuangana Mateta. Meanwhile, internal tensions brewed, leading to a rift with Verckys, who took back the instruments he had previously lent to the group in the middle of a concert at the Ciné Palladium in Kinshasa, later called Cinémax. Zaïko Langa Langa was inactive for a nine-month hiatus, bereft of both instruments and financial sustenance. Despite this schism, the band pressed on with another European tour in the latter part of 1981 and produced additional recordings. During this phase, Koffi Olomide, who was not yet affiliated with a specific band, contributed the track "Femme noire" to their Oka Biso !!! Tokangi Robinet !!! album, joining voices with Likinga, Lengi Lenga, Bimi Ombale, and N'Yoka Longo.

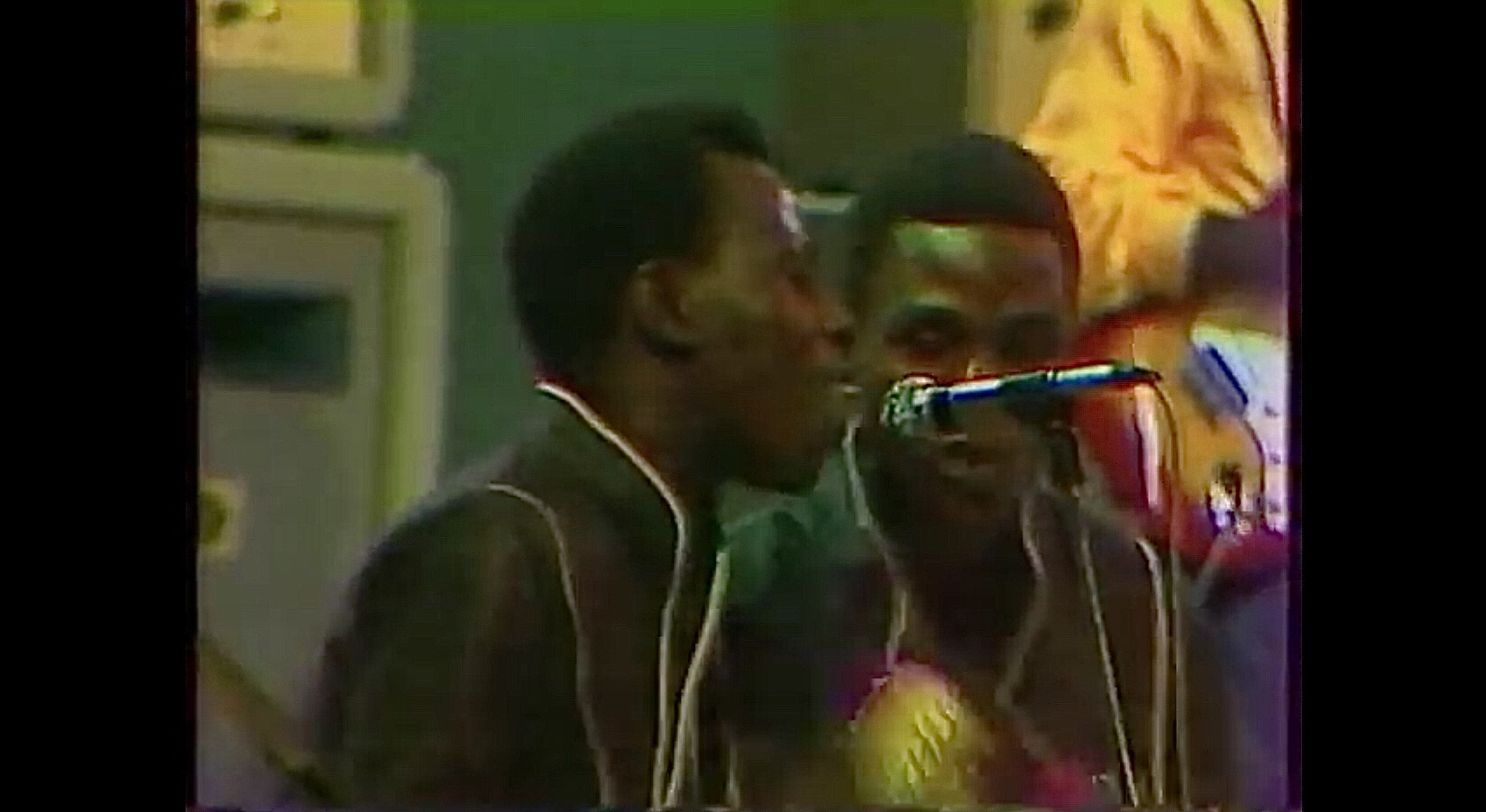
During their time with the band, Bébé Atalaku and Nono Monzuluku co-pioneered atalaku.

The four remaining tracks from the Studio Igloo session were released in 1982 on the band's fourth LP, titled Tout-Choc. Despite these challenges, the band's main songwriters composed several new tracks. Their fifth LP, a double album titled Funky (often mistakenly called Nkolo Mboka due to the album cover lacking a title), was released in September 1982.

During the official presentation of the album on 30 October 1982, on the televised program Variété Samedi Soir, spectators witnessed the pioneering inclusion of atalaku (also called "animateur" by the French term) in Congolese rumba. The atalaku Nono Monzuluku and Bébé Mangituka as well as the percussionist Djerba Mandjeku Makale joined the group, coming from the traditional group Bana Odéon, based in Kintambo, where the animation originated. Over the next few decades, almost every band on the Congolese music scene introduced atalaku as members.

==== From Muvaro to Nippon Banzaï ====
Zaïko Langa Langa's eighth LP, Muvaro, was recorded in early 1983 at Studio I.A.D. in Brazzaville. The eponymous song, composed by Lengi Lenga, tells the story of a woman who laments being abandoned by her husband, Muvaro. The song became a smash hit and was particularly noted for its melodious sebene, performed by guitarist Beniko Zangilu "Popolipo". Popolipo had been recruited to replace Roxy Tshimpaka, who left the band in 1981 alongside Evoloko Jocker to become one of the "7 patrons" of Langa Langa Stars. Zaïko Langa Langa's next LP, Zekete Zekete 2ème Episode, was also released in 1983, specifically in the month of August. It was recorded in Paris during another European tour. Zekete Zekete 2ème Episode becomes the first record to include atalakus. The album's name derived from the band's flagship dance of that era, zekete zekete. Prior to the release of the album, in the month of July, Likinga Redo was arrested in Grândola in Portugal for narcotic possession.

D.V. Moanda demised on 10 January 1984, at the age of 36. Until 1987, an annual concert was executed in tribute to him. A few months post-Moanda's death, a Gabonese promoter, Gustave Bongo, self-styled 'Ngossanga' or 'Ngoss' for brevity, alleged to be kin to president Omar Bongo, proposed to Zaïko Langa Langa's administrators to sponsor band. That same year, singer Dindo Yogo joined the band. Zaïko Langa Langa's tenth studio album, named On Gagne le Procès, was released in June 1984. It was issued on CD in 1992 by SonoDisc as L'Authéntique Zaïko Langa Langa. The succeeding album, Le Tout Choc Zaïko Langa Langa en Europe, was also published in 1984. During Zaïko Langa Langa's European tours, albums were recorded in Brussels. On 2–3 November 1984, Zaïko Langa Langa gave out sold-out concerts respectively at the Palais du 12 mars and Stade Omar Bongo in Libreville. The subsequent year, the band embarked on a Canadian tour. In mid-1985, Ngoss procured Zaïko Langa Langa's Ma-Elika Bar, a modest club on Rue Kanda-Kanda in Matonge, which he refurbished and renamed N'Goss Club, establishing it as the band's headquarters. Two additional LPs were released: ProZal-produced Zaïko Eyi Nkisi, which included the third version of "Etape" and Dindo Yogo's acclaimed hit "Mokili Échanger", chronicling Yogo's musical career and a segment of Zaire's political history, and the four-track Tala Modele Echanger, produced by ProZal and distributed by Safari Ambiance in Belgium. Tala Modele Echanger was recorded and mixed at D.E.S. Studios.

During a string of Ngoss-coordinated concerts in Gabon late in 1985, Ngoss endowed Zaïko Langa Langa with new instruments, and in 1986, they released two LPs, Eh Ngoss ! Eh Ngoss ! Eh Ngoss ! in the earlier months and Pusa Kuna... Serrez ! Serrez !, which included tracks "Paiement Cash", "Mena", "Ben-Betito", and "Matshi Ya Ilo". Produced by ProZal, it explores the themes of love, wisdom and separation, with "anguish set to tunes of joy". British writer Gary Stewart extolled it, stating, "The voices blend with ease, yet the beat steps lively as before with a dose of synthesizer added in the name of progress". To recompense Ngoss for his support, copies of Pusa Kuna... Serrez! Serrez! and other Zaïko Langa Langa records were directly dispatched to Ngoss Productions in Libreville for distribution in Gabon. Zaïko Langa Langa managed its distribution in Zaire, while Safari Ambiance oversaw the European distribution. According to Stewart, they also named Ngoss the band's honorary president, and their mabanga vocabulary expanded to include the shout "eh Ngoss, eh Ngoss".

In late October and early November 1986, Zaïko Langa Langa toured Japan, performing two concerts in Tokyo on 27 and 28 October, followed by shows in Hadano and Osaka before returning to Tokyo for the fifth and final concert. The tour inspired the band's sixteenth studio album, Nippon Banzai, which was released in December 1986. Recorded in Brussels, the album contains two continuous medleys featuring twelve songs from the tour setlist. In a 1986 interview, N'Yoka Longo explained that the Japanese concerts followed a shorter format than Zaïko Langa Langa's usual four-to-five-hour performances in Kinshasa. Nippon Banzai remains regarded as one of the classic albums of Congolese popular music.

In May 1987, Zaïko Langa Langa released the LP Papa Omar, which featured two songs inspired by Teke folklore, "Mikady" and "Ensemble Chansons Bateke", alongside the rumba-inspired "Chérie Ngossanga". In June 1987, the band became finalists in the Référendum RFI Canal tropical, ranking second among Afro-Caribbean groups behind Kassav.

==== Subissez les Conséquences and major split ====
On 1 August 1987, as part of the 4th All-Africa Games, Zaïko Langa Langa performed at a sold-out Moi International Sports Centre. The band maintained a busy concert schedule throughout the year, appearing at the Cirque d'Hiver Bouglione in Paris in October, at the Salle Arlequin in Brussels on 10 November, and at the Maison de la Mutualité in Paris on 28 November. On 20 November, they made history as the first Congolese band to perform on TF1, appearing on Panique sur le 16 hosted by Christophe Dechavanne, where they played "Sandra Lina" and "Muvaro". That same month, the band released their remix album Bongama Kamata Position. In December 1987, their eighteenth studio album, Subissez les Conséquences, was issued, and on 26–27 December, they celebrated their 18th anniversary with a two-day concert at the Palais du Peuple, with guest appearances by Papa Wemba, Evoloko Jocker, Mavuela Somo, and Félix Manuaku Waku.

At this time, internal tensions escalated within the band due to leadership disputes, salary issues and unpaid royalties. These tensions, which had been simmering since the production of Subissez les Conséquences, eventually led to the band's official split on 6 May 1988. The division resulted in the formation of a new splinter band Zaïko Langa Langa Familia Dei, established by Ilo Pablo, and Bimi Ombalé, and it included most of the band's members, approximately 80%. Those who stayed with Longo were Belobi, Bapius, Matima, Yogo, Monzuluku, Zamuangana, and Gilbert Benamayi. After the split, both groups became rivals, vying for musical prominence and engaged in a lengthy legal dispute over naming rights. Following the split, Zaïko Langa Langa initiated a recruitment drive to rebuild its roster. New members included Adamo Ekula (vocals) and Baroza Bansimba (lead guitar) from Grand Zaïko Wawa, as well as Jean-Marie Motingia (bass), Doudou Adoula (atalaku), Shango Landu (rhythm guitar), and Mafuta Mondial (vocals) from Tout Choc Oka. Former Viva La Musica singer Aziza Nsiku also joined the lineup, along with vocalists Thylon Muanda and Lofanga Ea Bengolo. Alpha Kopeya was added on synthesizer, Shiro Mvuemba (ex-Minzoto Wella Wella) on lead guitar, and Cele Mbonda, a percussionist from Langa Langa Stars.

Zaïko Langa Langa released their nineteenth LP, entitled Jetez l'Éponge, in December 1989, a medley to introduce the new members of the band. During that year's tour, on 3 December, they headlined a show at the Hammersmith Palais in London.

=== 1990–2002: from Ici ça va...Fungola Motema to Euréka! ===
In 1990, Zaïko Langa Langa became the headliner of concerts in French halls, notably the Maison de la Mutualité. During the tour they recorded their twentieth album, Ici ça va...Fungola Motema, which contained six songs, including "Exil" composed by Adamo Ekula. Described by The Beat, an American music publication, as characterized by "spirited choral vocals, good hooky melodies and vibrant, spin-ning and tortuous solo guitar passages", the album gained significant recognition, with "Exil" winning the ACMZA accolade of Best Song of the Year in 1991.

Zaïko Langa Langa readied their next album, Jamais Sans Nous, which included the breakout single "Dede" composed by Jossart N'Yoka Longo. The album reached number one on the UK Sterns Music Charts in January 1992, shortly after its release in December 1991. Following their international tour, the band remained based in Kinshasa for a three-year period, during which the group focused on the preparation and development of their album Avis de Recherche. At the same time, they performed many concerts, including a memorable double-headline concert with Wenge Musica at the Intercontinental Hotel of Kinshasa (now Pullman Kinshasa Grand Hôtel), which the audience widely regarded as a triumph for ZLL, and also a two-day reunion concert of the Clan Langa Langa on 15–16 October 1993 with Papa Wemba, Dindo Yogo and members who had previously splintered to form Zaïko Langa Langa Familia Dei. Apart from those concerts, Zaïko Langa Langa also performed concerts across East Africa. In February 1995, after arriving in Paris to record their next album, they played a double-headline concert with Pépé Kallé at Aquaboulevard Paris. Eventually, on 31 May 1995, Avis de Recherche was released. The album was a great success and was featured in the French weekly cultural and television magazine Télérama. Avis de Recherche was first introduced to audiences in Zaire through a series of concerts before being promoted internationally during Zaïko Langa Langa's second European tour of 1995.

During the summer of 1996, the band's then-current lineup established its traditional annual European tour, using Brussels as their main base of operations. From Brussels, the group was able to easily reach the public spread across Belgium, France, Germany, Switzerland, England, and even as far as Spain and Portugal. Brussels also provided convenient access to Paris, where the group carried out several recording sessions. In late 1996, they released Sans Issue for Sun Records. The 10-track album was followed by Backline Lesson One, released in April 1997 under the Sonima Music label. These projects came on the heels of the band's 1995 Avis de Recherche, which had achieved significant commercial and critical success. Building on that momentum, Zaïko Langa Langa refined its stage show to incorporate new songs as well as an array of dynamic and innovative dance routines that reinforced its reputation as one of the most electrifying live acts in Congolese music. The core ensemble for the 1996 European concerts included twenty-one members. Among the performances that year, they delivered shows on 20 September and 13 December 1996 at Melkweg in Amsterdam; 7 October 1996 at the Berdux center in Munich; and at the Aquaboulevard in Paris. In addition, the band performed at the Grand Hôtel de Kinshasa in 1996 to celebrate their annual anniversary concert. The following year, in 1997, they appeared again at the Salle de la Madeleine in Brussels. Upon their return to Kinshasa, Zaïko Langa Langa recruited young musicians to rejuvenate their lineup, including vocalists Willy Bula, Lassa Landu, Deo Brondo and guitarists Daniel 6000 and Rocky Blanchard. Their new album, Nous y Sommes, released on 2 April 1998, was recorded in Kinshasa, at Studio Ndiaye. The band arrived in Paris in 1999, they performed at the Cannes Film Festival in May, then they recorded the album Poison, which was released towards the end of 1999. Shortly before the recording of the album, Meridjo Belobi, Oncle Bapius, and Modeste Modikilo, left the band to establish Zaïko Langa Langa Universel. Despite this, Zaïko Langa Langa continued to tour internationally, performing in Paris and the Benelux. During this time, a documentary was made about Zaïko Langa Langa, titled Zaïko Langa Langa, le goût du travail bien fait, directed by Yves Billon.

On 20 April 2001, the band issued a three-track maxi-single titled Feeling through JPS Production, a Cameroonian Paris-based label founded by Jean-Pierre Saah. The maxi-single featured "Daniel" and "Tshibawu", written by Jossart N'Yoka Longo, and "Moti Pole-Pole", by Jean-Marie Motingia. Feeling achieved great success in Kinshasa and Brazzaville, topping local charts within two weeks of release. The accompanying music videos were also produced by JPS, who managed production for both the band and N'Yoka Longo himself. Its success was widely attributed to N'Yoka Longo's leadership and the energy of the Attaque Laser (also called The Boys) singers lineup, such as Strelly Mikobi, Prince Bela, Marcel Bakenda, Thiro Mulunda, and Bidjana Vangu, whose teamwork helped revitalize the band after a period marked by member departures.

Zaïko Langa Langa was scheduled to perform in Canada from 25 October to 25 November, as part of their Canadian tour. However, due to logistical challenges, the tour was postponed to early December 2001 and was then expanded into a Euro-American tour including performances in France, Belgium, Ireland, London, Switzerland, Germany, Italy, Canada, and the United States. Four weeks before the rescheduled date, the Euro-American tour was again deferred to 2002. From 22–24 December, Zaïko Langa Langa commemorated their 32nd anniversary with various nationwide performances. Before their Euro-American tour, a performance at Zénith Paris, initially slated for 13 July 2002, was postponed to 7 September. Despite the change, the event was a huge success, with Zaïko Langa Langa's fandom considering it as the band's renaissance. Joseph Kanka of Le Phare described the performance as a "high-quality show" and praised Zaïko Langa Langa as the "leading orchestra of the 3rd generation" and a "great Congolese musical group" esteemed by black Africa, Europe, and the global musical fraternity.

On 23 December, Zaïko Langa Langa released their twenty-seventh studio album Euréka!, which was recorded in Paris during their Euro-American tour at Studio Plus XXX, Studio Marcadet, Studio Harry Son, and Studio Zola Tempo. Comprising 11 tracks, Euréka! was produced by JPS Production. It blends Congolese rumba, soukous, and ndombolo. Jossart N'Yoka Longo was the album's art director and lead vocalist, with contributions from vocalists Adamo Ekula, José Père Elanga, Strelly Mikobi, Prince Bela, and Thiro Mulunda, and instrumentalists Jean-Louis Manzanza and Jean-Marie Motingia on bass guitar, Trocadero Mukusa on drums, Daniel Muanda, Petit Poisson and Tshanda Sourate on lead guitar, and Clément Synthé on keyboards. Euréka! was the final album featuring the late soloist Daniel Muanda and marked the introduction of Tshanda Sourate. It received significant acclaim in the Democratic Republic of the Congo and the Republic of the Congo. Congolese producer and businessman Eugide Defer acclaimed Zaïko Langa Langa as the "greatest Congolese musical group of all time".

=== 2003–2008: Internal disputes and legal issues, Empreinte, and Rencontres ===
In April 2003, during their performance in Ireland to further promote Euréka!, Daniel, Clément Synthé, drummer Célé Mbonda, and Trocadero expressed dissatisfaction with Jossart N'Yoka Longo's handling of funds. Tensions persisted, affecting Zaïko Langa Langa's consistency in concerts. In November 2003, the Belgian authorities launched an investigation into the "Nyoka Longo case," leading to charges and N'Yoka Longo's temporary imprisonment on allegations including "modern slavery", "human trafficking", "visa trafficking", "incitement to pimping", "illegal immigration", "nighttime disturbance", and "use of unsanitary premises". Despite a lack of concrete evidence, N'Yoka Longo spent a month in preventive detention in Brussels. The Congolese Ministry of Culture, SONECA, and UMUCO campaigned for his release, which was eventually granted in June 2004 after bail was posted by the Congolese head of state.

Following N'Yoka Longo's release from detention, Zaïko Langa Langa announced the impending release of their twenty-eighth studio album, Empreinte, which was in its final production stages. Empreinte was officially launched on 3 December. Initially planned as a maxi-single with five tracks in 2003, it evolved into a full-length album. Recorded after Zaïko Langa Langa's contractual relationship with JPS Productions ended, the album was released under their own label, ProZal, in collaboration with WBE and distributed by Atoll Music. Empreinte was released as a CD and DVD package. The CD contained nine audio tracks, while the DVD included music videos for several songs and additional live performances. The album featured a guest appearance by Sam Mangwana. N'Yoka Longo was album's lead vocalist, with Jean-Marie Motingia on bass guitar, Alonso Baba on drums, Jimmy Yaba on rhythm guitar, Clément Synthé on keyboards, Tshanda Sourate on lead guitar, and vocal contributions from Gégé Yoka Mangaya, Shango Landu Kiangala, Adamo Ekula, Lassa Landu, Marcel Bakenda, Prince Bela, Strelly Mikobi, and Thiro Mulunda.

Zaïko Langa Langa's twenty-ninth studio album, Rencontres, debuted on 7 September 2007. The album was produced by Wedoo Music and distributed by ProZal. Rencontres consists of 11 tracks and was recorded at Music Box Studio, Studio Rimshot, Studio Music' Ange, and Digital Edge. The album was produced by Bienvenu Chirac Mondzo, with executive production handled by Gégé Mangaya. The mixing was done by Thierry Galion and Wilfrid Harpaillé, while engineering was carried out by Edouard Meunier and Yves N'Jock. It featured former members of Zaïko Langa Langa and associated acts of the band, including Tony Dee.

=== 2009–present: Successful resurgence ===
==== Performances and the 40th anniversary celebration dispute ====
In early 2009, Zaïko Langa Langa returned to Kinshasa after a period of dislocation, during which most members remained in Europe. After their return, the band consisted of only eight musicians, but they had a reserve team called Les Ganers. In April 2009, Zaïko Langa Langa headlined four concerts in Kinshasa. The first, a VIP event, was at Pullman Kinshasa Grand Hotel on 18 April, and the second at Chapiteaux du GB. The other two, sponsored by Bralima, took place in the Kinkole neighborhood and at Métropole dancing club in the Kasa-Vubu commune.

In October–November 2009, N'Yoka Longo and Gina Efonge clashed over the organization of the 40th-anniversary celebration of Zaïko Langa Langa which was intended to reunite former band members. Nyoka Longo, asserting his leadership, sought to direct the event, arguing that he epitomized the band's legacy on stage. Contrariwise, Efonge opposed this and advocated for a collaborative effort among all original members, including Evoloko Jocker, Mavuela Somo, Papa Wemba, Likinga Redo, Bozi Boziana, and Félix Manuaku Waku, to ensure a grand celebration. Consequently, the event did not materialize due to persistent disagreements and a lack of cohesive leadership.

==== Bande Annonce, Sisikaaaaaahh! Moto na moto na... ====
In April 2011, during an interview with La Prospérite, N'Yoka Longo announced Zaïko Langa Langa's forthcoming four-track maxi-single, Bande Annonce, was nearly complete. Band member André Betty Mambu also told the press that Bande Annonce would "revolutionize musical data in Congo and Africa." The maxi-single was officially released on 6 August under ProZal and distributed by Sebig Sprl. It was recorded at Zola Tempo studio within the RTNC compound in the Lingwala commune, with sound mixing done in South Africa, mastering in France, and pressing in Dubai. N'Yoka Longo composed three tracks: "Boh!", "Jusqu'où Papy?" and "Mo Mambu", with Tony Dee composing "Eka". Bande Annonce achieved commercial success and introduced a new dance called "Mukongo ya Koba", which translates to "the turtle's back" in Lingala. Jordache Diala of La Prospérité stated that the dance "made apotheosis in the Kinois musical sphere". It won the Best Dance at the ninth edition of the Trophée Muana Mboka on 24 August 2011, held at Pullman Kinshasa Grand Hotel. In December of that year, Bande Annonce peaked atop the 2011 Congolese Hit Parade. They support it with a concert at Pullman Kinshasa Grand Hotel on 31 January 2012, followed by a sold-out performance at Nuit de la Francophonie hosted at Stade des Martyrs on 10 October, as part of the events planned for the 14th summit of the Organisation internationale de la Francophonie.

On 2–3 March 2013, Zaïko Langa Langa held a two-day concert in Mbuji-Mayi, in celebration of Kasaï-Oriental Province's governor Alphonse Ngoyi Kasanji's 50th birthday. On 21 June, they appeared at the Bralima-sponsored Primus mega-concert at Stade des Martyrs as part of the festivities marking Bralima's 90th anniversary. On 19 April 2014, Zaïko Langa Langa took the stage at Roméo Golf in Kinshasa, followed by the Bralima-sponsored Primus Fete de la Musique at the Théâtre de Verdure in Ngaliema commune in June 2014.

On 2 August 2014, Zaïko Langa Langa released the four-track maxi-single Sisikaaaaaahh! Moto na moto na... after the popularity of their Maman Siska dance. It was a follow-up to Bande Annonce, with an additional track and a bonus track added to the original list. The album was produced by Dios Mena and distributed by ProZal. The lead single, "Susu Atambuli Yenga", achieved significant success in Kinshasa. They endorsed the maxi-single with a show at Stade Municipal de Masina at Hôtel Invest in Kinshasa in January 2015 and later took part in the unveiling of Bimi Ombale's mausoleum at Cimetière Mingadi on the Bas-Congo road in Kasangulu. Zaïko Langa Langa then performed on Bimi Ombale Avenue in Matonge alongside Bozi Boziana, Evoloko Jocker, and Papa Wemba.

On 27 June, they took part in Kinshasa's city center festivities commemorating the 55th anniversary of DRC's Independence and subsequently performed at the 10th edition of the Pan-African Music Festival (FESPAM) at Stade Félix Eboué in Brazzaville. In August 2015, Zaïko Langa Langa held a concert in Kindu during Prime Minister Matata Ponyo Mapon's visit to Maniema Province.

==== Releases and performances ====
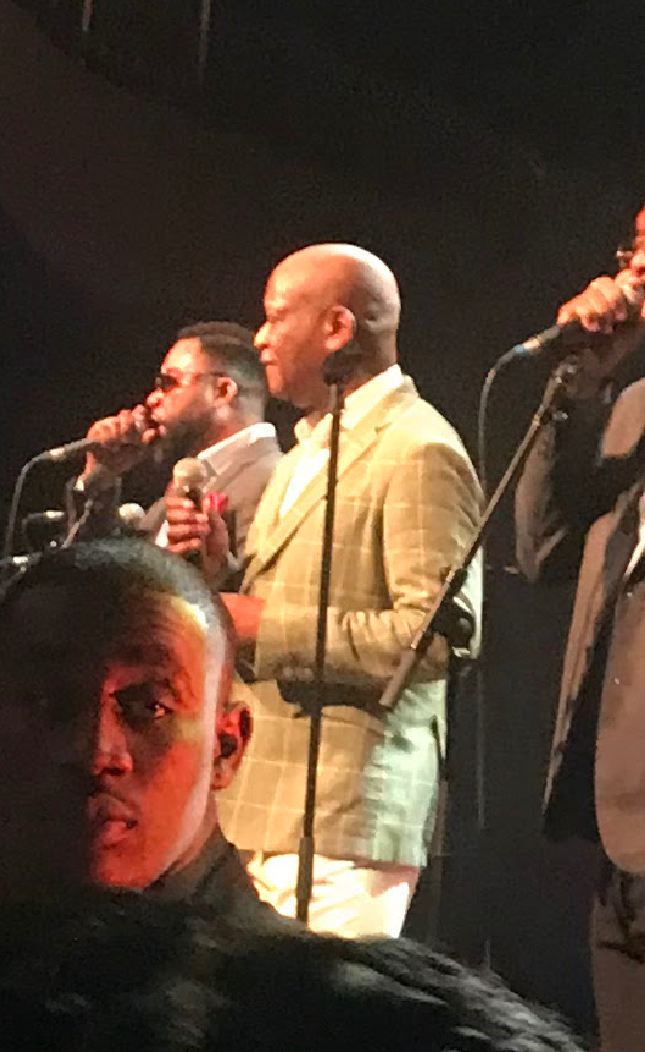
Zaïko Langa Langa performing in Brussels

In 2018, Zaïko Langa Langa embarked on an American tour that took them to 12 American states, including California, Texas, Maryland, Ohio, and New York State, as well as the capital, Washington. They also visited Ottawa, Montreal and Toronto in Canada. The following year, the band began their tour in New York State and returned for a double concert before going to Connecticut, Maine, Pennsylvania, and Texas. They then joined Missouri and Illinois before returning to Missouri once again.

After their international tour, Zaïko Langa Langa performed two concerts in Kinshasa in July 2019, at the Kinshasa's performing arts theater Show Buzz and Chez Ntemba, during which they announced the release of their new double album, Sève, in honor of their 50th anniversary. Initially slated for a July 2019 release, Sève made its debut on 7 September. The album was mainly produced in Kinshasa by ProZal, and mixed in France by the Parisian record label Quart de Lune. It consisted of fourteen tracks, with a predominant blend of Congolese rumba. The accompanying videos for "Sielumuka Ngwasuma" and "Ambiance Eyenga" premiered on 28 December 2019 and 28 January 2020, respectively. Jossart N'Yoka Longo's breakout composed track "Système Ya Benda" was released on 23 August 2020. The song denounces the negative values prevalent in modern Congolese society, such as poisoning, duplicity, envy, and ingratitude.

After more than ten years of absence on the European stages, N'Yoka Longo and Zaïko Langa Langa perform at the Palais des Beaux Arts in Brussels on 29 February 2020, to celebrate the band's Golden jubilee. Starting from the late 2000s, a group of opponents of ex-president Joseph Kabila, the Combattants, have boycotted performances by Congolese artists, accused of being close to the Government. On the day of the concert, about forty of them were present outside the hall, but they failed to cancel the performance. On 16 May 2024, Zaïko Langa Langa gave a performance at the Clapham Grand hall in London. On 19 May and 14 June, they proceeded to headline two umpteenth sold-out events at the Salle de la Madeleine in Brussels.

On 17 October 2025, Zaïko Langa Langa released the EP Makinu, which means "dance" in Kikongo, through ProZal. The four-track EP includes "Mbrouss", "Awa Te! (Pas Ici!)", a remix version of "Souvenir Masa" (first issued in 1978 on the front and back of a 45 rpm record), and "Chez Pana Fereira". Jossart Muanza of Digital Congo Radio Télévision noted that "Mbrouss" carries a heavier, more explosive tone, with its title evoking the sound made when a footballer traps the ball underfoot, which is an exclamation likewise heard when praising a clever feint or stepover that the vocalists emulate. The "Souvenir Masa" remix pays tribute to the influence of earlier generations and honors the cultural heritage reinterpreted by emerging figures, including Vaugerard Mampuya, Acouda Nzuzi, Serge Kanza, Alino Mangubu, and Tshotsho Matiaba.

On 24 April 2026, they performed at the Zénith Paris for the second time in their career, 24 years after their first appearance there. The concert drew over 6,000 attendees and included guest appearances by Lita Bembo and Jean-Claude Naimro from Kassav'. A segment of the concert was devoted to honoring Papa Wemba in remembrance of the tenth anniversary of his passing in 2016.

== Musical style and development ==
=== Departure from traditional Congolese rumba styles ===
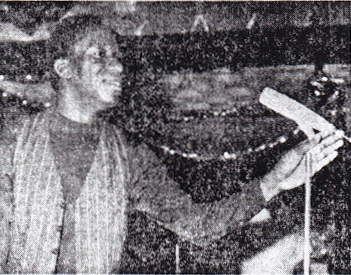
Tabu Ley Rochereau performing at the Paris Olympia in 1970. Widely regarded as one of Zaïko Langa Langa's key musical influences.

Unlike contemporaneous bands like TPOK Jazz and African Jazz, which embodied the popular Rumba Odemba and Fiesta styles, Zaïko Langa Langa charted a new path musically, incorporating sounds from various sources, including elements from the Fiesta school and inspiration from Belgian-based Congolese bands such as Los Nickelos and Yeye National, as well as the revered Tabu Ley Rochereau, whom they regarded as their "godfather". The band shifted from wind instruments to a more percussion-driven style, focusing on the snare drum and solo guitar to create a distinctive, modern sound. A defining innovation was the cavacha rhythm, which was introduced in 1971 when drummer Meridjo Belobi reproduced the beat of a train ride from Brazzaville to Pointe-Noire on his drum kit. Zaïko Langa Langa further advanced the genre by incorporating synthesizers in 1979 through keyboardist Nzenze Mongengo, who utilized guitar pedals to generate electronic effects, debuting in the track "Révélation", written by Otis Mbuta. This experimentation transformed their musical style, a shift carried forward by future keyboardists including José Piano-Piano, Alpha Kopeya, and Modeste Modikilo. Central to this transformation was guitarist Félix Manuaku Waku, whose refined style, shaped by influences such as Docteur Nico, Franco Luambo, and Gerry Gerard, revolutionized Congolese rumba guitar, with his distinctive finger structure enabling intricate chord progressions crucial to sebene. In 1982, Zaïko Langa Langa furthered this innovation by introducing the role of the atalaku, a performer who infused the sebene with energetic chants and calls, a dynamic system that swiftly became the standard for Kinshasa's youth-oriented bands. While the style was rapidly adopted by younger generations, it faced considerable criticism from older, more traditional listeners who deemed it overly cacophonous and lacking lyrical sophistication. By 1984, the band had broken new ground with their double-drumming technique, using Belobi and Bakunde Ilo Pablo to create a layered rhythmic texture where one drummer played the snare while the other focused on rolls and cymbals.

=== Songwriting process and dance contributions ===
Zaïko Langa Langa has historically prioritized a collaborative and detail-oriented method of songwriting. In its early days, all band members had the chance to compose and submit original pieces, which, if accepted, were subject to a lengthy process of rehearsal, arrangement, and polishing by the band to ensure quality.

Since its inception, the band has introduced over thirty dances. Their debut performance on 24 March 1970 at the Hawaï bar in Kalamu marked the birth of the Ngouabin dance, conceived by a resident of Makala Central Prison which was part of Kinshasa's bill culture. In 1971, the band popularized Levole, a dance of Tetela origin introduced by Papa Wemba. The band's influence on contemporary Congolese rumba sparked a constant wave of new dances, with Zaïko Langa Langa leading the charge in creating popular dances as Ngouabin, Levole, Cavacha (linked to the cavacha rhythm), Choquez Retardé, Disco Tara, Sonzo Ma, Volant/Guidon, Guidon, Washa Washa, Wondo Stock, Zekete Zekete, Elengi Eye, Maria, Funky, Tukuniema, Vimba, and Siska, among others.

== Awards and accolades ==
Zaïko Langa Langa has been honored with the Best Orchestra of Zaire award on four occasions by the Association des Journalistes Chroniqueurs de Musique du Zaïre (ACMZA), in the years 1973, 1974, 1976, and 1992. Evoloko Jocker was awarded Best Star of Zaire in 1974 (Eluzam) and 1980 (Fievre Mondo). Songs by individual members of the group received recognition for Best Song, with Evoloko Jocker receiving the award in 1974 and 1980, Jossart N'Yoka Longo in 1976 and 1979, and Adamo Ekula in 1991. In 1979, N'Yoka Longo was elected Second Best Songwriter, with the top position being awarded to guitarist Mayaula Mayoni for his composition "Sentiment Awa".

In 1977, N'Yoka Longo, Likinga Redo, Mbuta Mashakado, and Félix Manuaku Waku were chosen to join the National Orchestra of Zaire (ONAZA) and participated in FESTAC 77 (World Festival of Black Arts) in Lagos, Nigeria.

Notably, in 1986, Zaïko Langa Langa secured the second position in the RFI referendum, closely following the Caribbean group Kassav. In 1987, Zaïko Langa Langa earned the Georges Delerue Award for Best Music at the Flanders International Film Festival in Ghent for their musical contributions to the film La Vie est Belle with the songs "Muvaro" and "Sandra Lina". Their participation in the Cannes Film Festival took place in May 1999, and in 2000, Zaïko Langa Langa was acclaimed as the best orchestra of the century in modern Congolese music.

The dance "Mukongo ya Koba" was bestowed the Best Dance award at the ninth edition of the Muana Mboka Trophy in August 2011. Moreover, in April 2014, Zaïko Langa Langa was honored with the Honor Award at the 14th edition of Kundé d'Or in Ouagadougou. During the first edition of the Pool Malebo Music Awards in October 2019, Zaïko Langa Langa received a nomination for the Best Orchestra, while N'Yoka Longo was nominated for Artist of the Decade.

== Band members ==
=== Current members ===
- Jossart N'Yoka Longo – vocals/leader (1969–present)
- Roucoulet Kibwa – drums (1991–present)
- Vaugerard Mampuya – vocals (2004–present)
- Acouda Nzuzi – vocals (2005–present)
- Tshotsho Matiaba – guitar (2005–present)
- Nganga Kiolayi – guitar (2005–present)
- Bijoux Bass – bass (2005–present)
- Guy Binga – cowbell (2005–present)
- Alain Biongo – atalaku (2005–present)
- Serge Kanza – vocals (2011–present)
- Popol Masivi – synthesizer (2016–present)
- Micho Ben – congas (2016–present)
- Blaise Zing – guitar (2024–present)
- Fabrice Desouza – vocals (2024–present)
- Des Années – atalaku (2024–present)
- Sandy Madiamba – drums (2025–present)

=== Past members ===
==== Musicians ====
- Félix Manuaku Waku – guitar (1969–1980)
- Papa Wemba – vocals (1969–1974)
- Charles Tchadé – vocals (1969–1970)
- Enoch Zamuangana – guitar (1969–1992)
- Teddy Sukami – guitar (1969–1981)
- Oncle Bapius – bass (1969–1999)
- Mbuta Matima – guitar (1969–1996)
- Siméon Mavuela Somo – vocals (1969–1974)
- Evoloko Jocker – vocals (1969–1974; 1979–1981)
- Pierre Nkumu – vocals (1970–1976; pop section)
- Mbuta Mashakado – vocals (1969–1976; 1978–1980)
- Damien Ndebo – bass (1969–1974)
- Baudouin Mitsho – drums (1969–1971)
- Ephraim – congas (1969–1971)
- Alfred Mandala – vocals (1970; pop section)
- Dieudonné Tunisien – vocals (1970; pop section)
- Bimi Ombale – drums/vocals (1969–1988)
- Meridjo Belobi – drums (1971–1999)
- Gina Efonge – vocals (1971–1977)
- Bozi Boziana – vocals (1973–1974; 1977–1981)
- Bakunde Ilo Pablo – drums (1974–1988)
- Likinga Redo – vocals (1975–1984)
- Lengi Lenga – vocals (1975–1988)
- Djudjuchet Luvengoka – drums (1978–1980)
- Mbuta Sansa – guitar (1979–1980)
- Cheikdan Mbuku – vocals (1979–1980)
- Yenga Yenga Junior – vocals (1978–1980)
- Petit Cachet Ndjoli – drums (1980–1981)
- Roxy Tshimpaka – guitar (1980–1982; 1993–1995)
- JP Buse – vocals (1982–1988)
- Gilbert Benamayi – vocals (1982–1990; pop section)
- Jimmy Yaba – guitar (1982–1988; 1996–2009)
- Petit Poisson Avedila – guitar (1982–1988; 1996–2008)
- José Piano-Piano – synthesizer, organ (1982–1988)
- Nono Monzuluku – atalaku (1982–2008)
- Bébé Atalaku – atalaku (1982–1988)
- Djerba Mandjeku Makale – percussion (1982–1988)
- Beniko Zangilu Popolipo – guitar (1983–1988)
- Dodo Munoko – vocals (1983–1985)
- Dindo Yogo – vocals (1984–1991)
- Patcho Star – drums (1987–1994)
- Mondial Mafuta – vocals (1988–2008)
- Adamo Ekula – vocals (1988–2008)
- Baroza Bansimba – guitar (1988–1997)
- Jean-Marie Motingia – bass (1988–1998; 1998–2009)
- Doudou Adoula – atalaku (1988–2023)
- Aziza Nsiku – vocals (1988–1993)
- Thylon Muanda – vocals (1988–2008)
- Lofanga Ea Bengolo – vocals (1988–1997)
- Alpha Kopeya – synthesizer (1988–1992; his death)
- Shiro Mvuemba – guitar (1988–1993; his death)
- Cele Mbonda – congas (1988–2003)
- Gégé Mangaya – guitar (1989–2018)
- Yoto Mayata – guitar (1992–1995)
- Modeste Modikilo – synthesizer (1992–1999; 2009–2018)
- Endho Ndumba – vocals (1993–1997)
- Laudy Mukaba – vocals (1993–1997)
- Volvo Lukebuka – guitar (1995–1997; 1999)
- Daniel 6000 – guitar (1997–2003)
- Willy Bula – vocals (1997–1999)
- Lassa Landu – vocals (1997–2005)
- Deo Brando – vocals (1997–2001)
- Rocky Blanchard – bass (1998)
- Papy Cocaïne – atalaku (1997–2009)
- Thierry Synthé – synthesizer (1999–2000)
- José Père Elanga – vocals (2000–2005)
- Strelly Mikobi – vocals (2000–2009)
- Prince Bela – vocals (2000–2009)
- Thiro Mulunda – vocals (2000–2009)
- Marcel Bakenda – vocals (2000–2009)
- Clément Synthé – keyboards (2000–2003)
- Jean-Louis Manzanza – bass (2000–2003)
- Choulay Evoloko – vocals (2001–2010)
- Trocadero Mukusa – drums (2001–2003)
- Tshanda Sourate – lead guitar (2001–2009)
- Alonso Baba – drums (2003–2009)
- Lola Muana – vocals (2006–2019)
- Richard – vocals (2006–2009)
- Des Affaires – vocals (2006–2009)
- Augusto Liandja – guitar (2006–2024)
- Mayi Chante – vocals (2006–2009)
- Sebo Mbala – vocals (2006–2010)
- Djo Katy – vocals (2006–2011)
- Hugues Atalaku – atalaku (2006–2008)
- Profa Mvuemba – guitar (2008–2010)
- Joe Bass – bass (2008–2009)
- Théo Mbala – atalaku (2010)
- Djo Moplat – vocals (2012–2015)
- Lady Chante – vocals (2013–2016)
- Loguylo Mabungu – drums (2014–2019)
- Edo Dollar – vocals (2015–2019)
- Samy Matondo – vocals (2016–2024)
- Shabair Nzonzi – guitar (2024–2026)

==== Dancers ====
- Sonnerie Nkuya - dancer (1975–1978)
- Radja Kula – dancer (1978–1980)
- Nicole Bilaho – dancer (1986-1987)
- Mboyo Bondele – dancer (1991–1994)
- Sakina – dancer (1991–1993)
- Guylaine Bangeleka – dancer (1992–1993)
- Zina Bilaho – dancer (1992–1993)
- Floriane Mangenda – dancer (1992–2000)
- Nina Alengisaka – dancer (1993–2002; 2008–2011)
- Marie Ekunza – dancer (1993–1994)
- Spaghetti – dancer (1993–1995)
- Jacky Bebeto – dancer (1994–1997; 2009–2011)
- Rosette Kamono – dancer (1995–1997)
- Godé Mujinga – dancer (1996–1999; deceased)
- Youyou Tchivundu – dancer (1996–1997)
- Francine Bongongo – dancer (1996–1999)
- Euphrasie Lokombe – dancer (1996–2002; 2008–2009)
- Nana Mulenga – dancer (1997–2000)
- Kembo Soki – dancer (1997–1999)
- Nicky Mwanza – dancer (1998–2004)
- Gisèle Diayandi – dancer (1998–2004)
- Josée Bobanga – dancer (1998–2002)
- Rosette Lifoa – dancer (2000–2002)
- Clarisse Zinga – dancer (2000–2002)
- Eva – dancer (2000–2001)
- Baby Mwako – dancer (2000–2002)
- Bibiche Japonaise – dancer (2000–2004)
- Bobette Kadogo – dancer (2000–2003)
- Nathalie Sakombi – dancer (2000–2003)
- Nana Mazopo – dancer (2000–2004)

== Discography ==
=== Albums ===
- Non Stop Dancing (1974)
- Plaisir de l'Ouest Afrique (double album, 1976)
- Gitta Production présente le Tout-Choc Zaïko Langa-Langa (1981)
- Tout Choc (1982)
- Funky (double album, 1982)
- La Tout Neige, Christine & Nalali Mpongui (1983)
- L'Orchestre de tous les Âges (1983)
- Muvaro/Etape (1983)
- Zekete Zekete 2è Épisode (1983)
- On Gagne le Procès (1984)
- En Europe (1984)
- Zaïko Eyi Nkisi (1985)
- Tala Modèle Echanger (1985)
- Eh Ngoss! Eh Ngoss! Eh Ngoss! (1986)
- Pusa Kuna... Serrez Serrez! (1986)
- Nippon Banzai (1986)
- Papa Omar (1987)
- Subissez les Conséquences (1987)
- Jetez l'Éponge (1989)
- Ici Ça Va... Fungola Motema (1990)
- Jamais Sans Nous (1991)
- Avis De Recherche (1995)
- Sans Issue (1996)
- Backline Lesson One (1997)
- Nous Y Sommes (1998)
- Poison (1999)
- Euréka ! (2002)
- Empreinte (2004)
- Rencontres (2007)
- Sève (2019)

=== Maxi-single ===
- Feeling (2001)
- Bande Annonce (2011)
- Sisikaaaaaahh! Moto na moto na... (2014)
- Makinu (2025)

=== Contributing artist ===
- The Rough Guide to World Music (1994)
- Les Ténors 2 L'Afrique (2005)

== Filmography ==
- Zaïko Langa Langa : Le goût du travail bien fait (1999, documentary)
