= Meridjo Belobi =

Congolese musician (1952–2020)

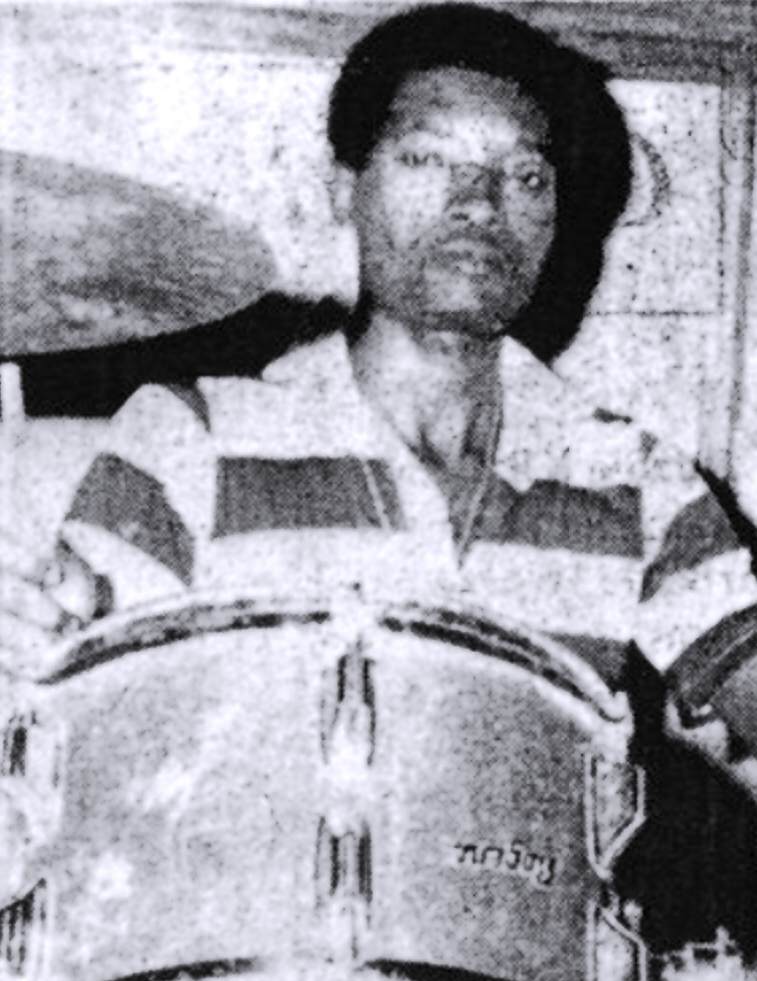
- Meridjo Belobi in 1979

Background information
- Born: Jean-Marie Belobi Ng’ekerme; December 22, 1952; Kinshasa, Democratic Republic of the Congo
- Died: August 27, 2020 (aged 67) Liège, Belgium
- Genres: Congolese rumba
- Occupations: Drummer and songwriter
- Instrument: Drums
- Years active: 1971–2019
- Formerly of: Zaïko Langa Langa

Jean-Marie Belobi Ng'ekerme (22 December 1952 – 27 August 2020), known professionally as Meridjo Belobi, was a Congolese drummer and songwriter. Known for being a long-time drummer for Zaïko Langa Langa, he is credited as the creator of the cavacha drum pattern, which gained international recognition and is considered as a major contribution to African popular music.

== Early years and musical debut ==
Jean Marie Belobi Ng'ekerme was born on 22 December 1952, in Léopoldville (now Kinshasa), then part of the Belgian Congo (later the Republic of the Congo, then Zaire, and currently the Democratic Republic of the Congo). He grew up in the Kauka neighborhood, located in the Kalamu commune. His father, who originally came from Mangai in Idiofa Territory and employed as a mechanic at ONATRA, played a significant role in shaping his early path by enrolling him at the Institut Supérieur des Techniques Appliquées (ISTA) with the intent of preparing him to take over his position after retirement. However, Belobi eventually chose to leave his studies and dedicate himself to music. In his youth, he was active in Xavérie, a Catholic cultural and educational movement, where he performed percussion at various events. He also briefly played for the B.C. Onatra basketball team in his early years.

In 1971, Belobi joined the youth band Zaïko Langa Langa which rehearsed at the Hôtel Azur, not far from his home. Initially a percussionist, he transitioned to the role of drummer after Bimi Ombale switched from drumming to singing. His stage name, Meridjo, was coined by fellow musician Papa Wemba, who reversed the syllables of "John Mary", a nickname Belobi was known by in his neighborhood.

== Innovation and musical career ==
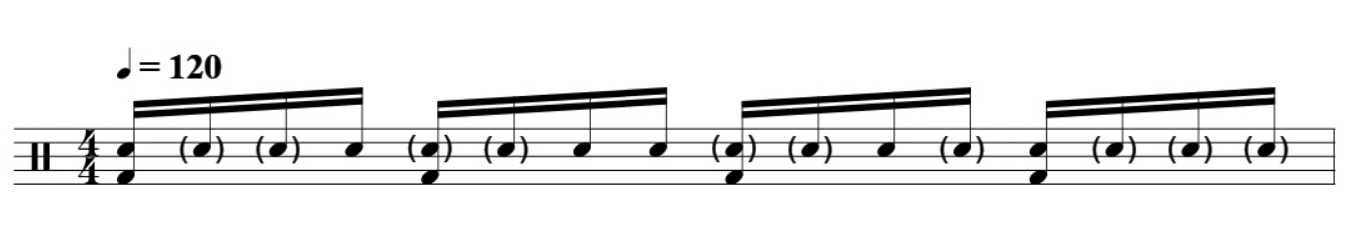
Cavacha original drum pattern or.

In 1973, during a trip from Brazzaville to Pointe-Noire, Belobi innovatively created the cavacha drum pattern. Inspired by the rhythm of the train's wheels, he developed this pattern on the snare or hi-hats. The Cavacha beat quickly became influential in Africa and later spread internationally, being incorporated into various musical genres. This innovation earned him the nickname "Masini Ya Kauka" (the Engine of Kauka in Lingala).

He faced a significant personal challenge in 1974 when he was imprisoned for 21 months at Ekafela prison for violating a curfew imposed on young Zairians. After his release, he recorded "Sangela," his first single with Zaïko Langa Langa, and continued to contribute to the band's success. Throughout the 1980s, Belobi played a crucial role in Zaïko Langa Langa. He was part of the group's administrative team alongside Jossart N'Yoka Longo and other prominent members. In 1985, he and fellow drummer Bakunde Ilo Pablo pioneered the concept of double-drumming in Congolese rumba. Belobi's talents took him on international tours with Zaïko, including a notable tour of Japan in 1986, prestigious halls in Europe and America as well as many sold-out stadiums in Africa.

Despite internal conflicts within Zaïko Langa Langa in 1988, which led to the formation of Zaïko Langa Langa Familia Dei, Belobi remained with the original band. During his tenure, he released several successful songs, including "Bisengo Na Bango," "Mosafi," "Bolingo Aveugle," "Matondo," "Nyongo Ekeseni," "Ize Bola," "Ben Betito," and "Mofiti".

After leaving Zaïko Langa Langa in 1999 due to administrative tensions, Belobi co-founded Zaïko Langa Langa Universel with Oncle Bapius and Modeste Modikilo. The group released one album, "Etumba Ya La Vie," featuring the eponymous title track composed by Belobi.

== Death ==
Belobi died on 27 August 2020 (aged 67), at the Liège University Hospital in Belgium after a prolonged illness. He was interred at the Nsele Necropolis in Kinshasa on 15 October 2020. In recognition of his contributions to music and culture, he was posthumously awarded the Gold Medal of Merit for Arts, Sciences and Letters by the Chancellor of the National Orders during a funeral ceremony at the National Museum in Lingwala.

== Legacy ==
Belobi inspired many prominent Congolese drummers, including Ramatoulaye Ngolali of Extra Musica and Papy Kakol of Wenge Musica Maison Mère. His creation of the cavacha drum pattern remains a significant contribution to the world of music.
