= Enoch Zamuangana =

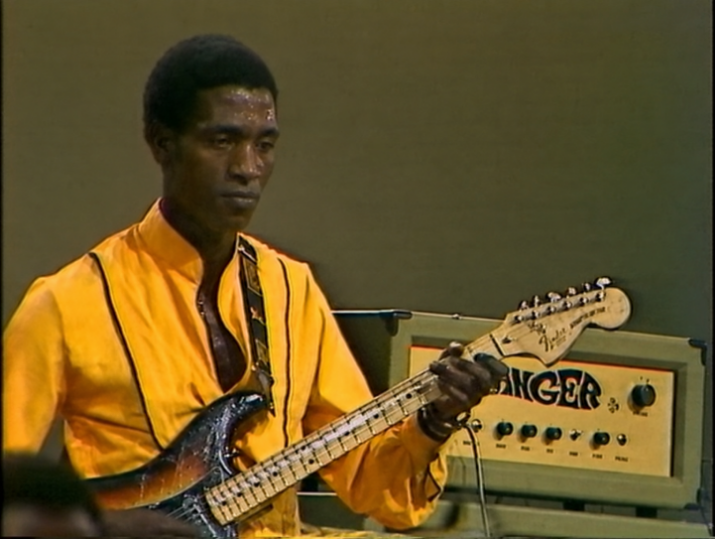
- Zamuangana in 1982.

Background information
- Born: Enoch Zamuangana Nsangu; 13 February 1951; Bas-Congo, Belgian Congo
- Died: 9 October 1992 (aged 41)
- Genres: Congolese rumba
- Occupations: Musician, guitarist, songwriter
- Instrument: Guitar
- Years active: 1969–1992
- Formerly of: Zaïko Langa Langa

Enoch Zamuangana Nsangu (13 February 1951 – 9 October 1992), known professionally as Enoch Zamuangana, was a Congolese musician, guitarist, and songwriter. He was a long-time contributor to the band Zaïko Langa Langa, where he played a key role in its lineup, music arrangements, and songwriting until his death.

== Early life and career ==
Enoch Zamuangana Nsangu was born on 13 February 1951 in Bas-Congo, then part of the Belgian Congo (now the Democratic Republic of the Congo). Prior to his music career, in 1969, he played football for FC Vijana of Matonge, where the musician Papa Wemba (then known as Jules Shungu Wembadio) served as coach. In December 1969, Zamuangana joined the newly formed band Zaïko Langa Langa as a rhythm guitarist. He remained with the group throughout his career, contributing significantly to its development and success in the Congolese music scene. Zamuangana was heavily involved in the band's main lineup and music arrangements. He penned several hit songs for Zaïko Langa Langa, including "Diakina", "Wedu", "Infidélité", "Fonsi", "Linya", and others. By the 1980s, as Jossart N'Yoka Longo assumed the presidency of the band, Zamuangana became vice-president. He played a stabilizing role during a major split in May 1988, which led to the formation of the rival group Zaïko Langa Langa Familia Dei. Zamuangana chose to remain with the original Zaïko Langa Langa under N'Yoka Longo's leadership. The band continued to produce albums, with Zamuangana contributing to recordings such as Ici ça va… Fungola motema in 1990 and Jamais sans nous in 1991.

== Death ==
Zamuangana withdrew from performing due to deteriorating health. He died on 9 October 1992, at the age of 41.
