= Evoloko Jocker =

Congolese singer and composer

Evoloko Atshuamo, best known as Evoloko Jocker (sometimes spelled Joker) or Lay Lay, is a popular Congolese soukous singer. Since the late 1960s, he has been in several major soukous bands, such as Zaiko Langa Langa, Isifi Lokole, and Langa Langa Stars.

== Biography ==
Evoloko was born in Belgian Congo (now the Democratic Republic of the Congo). He began his career in Zaiko Langa Langa, one of the biggest Congolese soukous bands, in 1969. His talent was so enthusiastically acclaimed by the public that he quickly became the frontman and band leader. Along with other musicians including Papa Wemba, Mavuela Somo, Gina Efonge, they created cavacha, a sound and dance style that became a trademark of Zaiko and a craze in East Africa in the 1970s. He wrote the best song of the year in 1973 (Onassis Ya Zaire) and again in 1974 (Eluzam). The huge success of these two songs and the cavacha dance established Zaiko Langa Langa as the top band for young people in the country. It is safe to say that Evoloko is the recording artist who put Zaiko on the map. He was the best and most prolific songwriter in the band, the lead singer, the best dancer. He was the guy who was drawing the crowd, who was electrifying the audience at the band's performances. He was the first recording artist of his generation to reach superstardom status in the country. In 1974 at the top of his career, he left Zaiko and together Papa Wemba, Mavuela Somo, Bozi Boziana, they formed the band Isifi Lokole. After six months of incredible success, a fight for leadership and mistrust led to the dismantling of the band. Mavuela Somo, Papa Wemba and Bozi Boziana decided to leave the Isifi Lokole band to form a new band, Yoka Lokole. Evoloko later renamed the band Isifi Melodia, welcomed new band members, including Djanana, Mr Gim's father, and guitar player Popolipo. The band struggled to find success and eventually, Evoloko decided to end his solo career and returned to Zaiko. He left Zaiko Langa Langa again in 1981 and, joined by other band members of Zaiko Langa Langa as well as Papa Wemba's band, they formed the band Langa Langa Stars. With the financial support of Kiamuangana Verckys, the band released hit after hit and had enormous success in the country. It included several popular musicians, including Bozi Boziana, Dindo Yogo, and Djanana. They came up with a very popular dance, mbiri mbiri. After 2 to 3 years of success, key band members began to quit. Evoloko recruited new musicians and got some success between 1984 and 1986. He relocated to Europe around 1989. After Langa Langa Stars, Evoloko kept playing either in solo projects or with other short-lived groups, such as Langa Langa Rénové (2008). He also occasionally collaborated with his original band, Zaiko Langa Langa.

== Partial discography ==
=== With Zaiko Langa Langa ===
- Onassis Ya Zaire
- Eluzam
- Mbeya Mbeya
- Fievre Mondo

=== With Langa Langa Stars ===
- Requiem
- Monama
- Kalolo
- Done' Done'
- La belle de Bangui
- Soleil
- Mingalina B 52

=== With Langa Langa Stars Renove' ===
- Mbonge Mbonge
- Samedi Soir
