= Mbuta Matima =

Congolese rumba musician (1951–1996)

- Born: Zéphyrin-Alexandre Matima Mpioso; April 14, 1951; Sona-Bata, Bas-Congo Province, DR Congo
- Died: May 26, 1996 (aged 45) Liège, Belgium
- Genres: Congolese rumba
- Occupations: Musician; guitarist; songwriter; arranger; music director
- Instrument: Guitar
- Years active: 1968–1996

Zéphyrin-Alexandre Matima Mpioso (14 April 1951 – 26 May 1996), known professionally as Mbuta Matima, was a prominent Congolese guitarist, arranger, music director and songwriter, best known for his influential work with Zaïko Langa Langa, one of the most famous and enduring bands of Congolese rumba.

== Life and career ==
Born in Sona-Bata, a town in the Bas-Congo Province, Matima began his musical career in 1969, debuting with Orchestre Stukas. In 1969, he joined Zaïko Langa Langa, initially as part of their pop section, performing as a concert opener alongside singers Mbuta Mashakado and Pierre Nkumu. Matima's transition to the band's main Congolese rumba section came in 1973 when singer Gina wa Gina Efonge encouraged him to play the guitar in place of the band's lead guitarist, Félix Manuaku Waku. Matima's first guitar solos featured in Efonge's song "BP Ya Munu," released in December 1973. His own first composition for Zaïko Langa Langa, "Ngeli Ngeli" (later versioned as "Kin Kiesse"), was recorded for the band's 1976 LP Plaisir de l'Ouest Afrique. In late 1976, he released another classic hit, "Toli Kulumpe," which was reversioned in 1977 and again in 1982. In 1978, Matima was part of Tout Grand Libanko, a nzonzing band by Gina wa Gina parallel to his career in Zaïko Langa Langa.

Following Manuaku's departure in 1980, Matima assumed greater responsibilities within the band as the artistic director and arranger. He played a crucial role in song composition and arrangement, significantly shaping the band's musical direction. One of his notable compositions, "Masela," appeared on Zaïko Langa Langa's 1984 LP On Gagne Le Procès. He also released classics like "Kabobo" and "Mena," which featured on the albums Tala Modèle Echanger (1985) and Pusa Kuna… Serrez! Serrez! (1986), respectively. Matima's skills as an arranger shone in the album Nippon Banzai, considered Zaïko Langa Langa's most successful and popular record.

In May 1988, a split within Zaïko Langa Langa led to the formation of Zaïko Langa Langa Familia Dei. Matima chose to remain with the original band. They released the LP Jetez l'Eponge in 1989. In Zaïko Langa Langa's 1991 LP Jamais sans Nous, Matima composed his final song for the band, "Reviens Hyppau," and played lead guitar on "Videma."

== Illness and death ==
Starting from 1992, Matima's health began to deteriorate, which forced him to stop playing guitar. He relocated to Liège, Belgium, where he spent his remaining years. Mbuta Matima died on May 26, 1996, at the age of 45.
