= Papa Wemba discography =

This article is the discography of Jules Shungu Wembadio Pene Kikumba, commonly known as Papa Wemba (14 June 1949 – 24 April 2016) who was a Congolese singer and musician who played Congolese rumba, soukous and ndombolo. Sometimes dubbed the King of Rumba Rock, he was one of the most popular musicians of his time in Africa and played an important role in world music.

Primarily, this discography includes Papa Wemba's recordings with the four musical groups and ensembles he was a member of during the time when he played a key role in each of them as both a lyricist and musician. The four groups (followed by the years Wemba was still active in the group) are:

- Zaiko Langa Langa (founding member) from 1969–74
- Isifi Lokole (founding member) 1974–75
- Yoka Lokole (founding member) 1975–78
- Viva La Musica (founding member) 1977–2016 especially after he took them to Paris, France in the early 1980s, while mixing into the music an "eclectic sound, that was influenced by western popular music reflecting a European flavor and style.

== Chronological studio albums ==
Note: Papa Wemba was part of more than 35 album recordings.

- Mabele Mokonzi (Elou) (1977)
- Franco présente Papa Wemba à Paris (1980, first full album in Paris)
- Rendre à César, ce qui est à César (1981)
- Bilombe Bakutani (1982, Trio N'Yo-Bi-We, collaborative album with N'Yoka Longo and Bimi Ombale)
- Santa (1982)
- Beloti (1982, recorded in 1980)
- Mwana Molokai (1983)
- Alanga Ndo (1983)
- Niekese! Elengi Hein!! (1983)
- Champs Elysées (1984, with Stervos Niarcos)
- La Guerre des Stars - Likambo ya Mopatasi (1985, with Lita Bembo, Bozi Boziana and Espérant Kisangani)
- Papa Wemba Ekumany (1985)
- 8ème Anniversaire (1985)
- Siku Ya Mungu (1986)
- "L'Esclave" (1986)
- Ceci-Cela = セシ・セラ (1987, Japanese release)
- Love Kilawu (1987)
- Destin ya Moto (1987)
- Papa Wemba (1988)
- Papa Wemba au Japon (1989 live album, recorded in 1986)
- Mokili Ngele (1989)
- Biloko ya Moto (1990)
- Le Voyageur (1992)
- Foridoles (1994)
- Emotion, Real World Records (1995)
- Pôle Position (1995)
- Wake-Up (1996, duo with Koffi Olomide)
- Nouvelle Ecriture (1997)
- Molokaï (1998)
- L' (L'Apostrophe) (1998)
- M’Zée Fula-Ngenge (1999)
- Mwana Matebu(1999)
- À La Une (2000)
- Bakala Dia Kuba (2001)
- Somo Trop (2003)
- Bazonkion (2005)
- Cheeky Summer time - Collab with Father J (2004)
- Attention L'artiste (2006)
- New Morning, live album and DVD (2006)
- Notre Père Rumba (2010)
- Maître D'école (2014)
