= Langa Langa Stars =

- Origin: Kinshasa, Democratic Republic of Congo
- Genre: Congolese rumba
- Years active: 1981–2015
- Labels: Éditions Veve International; Rythmes et Musique; Flash Diffusion Business

Langa Langa Stars was a Congolese rumba band formed in Kinshasa, Democratic Republic of the Congo (then Zaire), in September 1981. Born out of a double defection from two of the genre's most prominent musical band, Zaïko Langa Langa and Viva La Musica, the group rapidly established itself as one of the most exciting and commercially successful ensembles of the early 1980s Congolese music scene. The ensemble became renowned for its dynamic vocal harmonies, intricate guitar riffs, high-energy dance steps, and the concept of collective leadership known as the "Seven Patrons" (or "7 Patrons"). At its peak, the group featured an extraordinary roster of talents drawn from the heart of the Kinshasa musical establishment, and its recordings circulated widely.

Although the group enjoyed significant popularity in the early to mid-1980s, particularly in Africa and among the Congolese diaspora in Europe, it was plagued by internal power struggles, financial disputes, and repeated defections. These issues mirrored the volatile politics common in Kinshasa's music scene during that era. Under the leadership of Evoloko Jocker, the band continued in various forms until the late 1980s, when it effectively transitioned into a vehicle for Evoloko's solo projects.

== History ==
=== 1981–1983: Formation, early recordings and first departures ===
In September 1981, less than a year after the broader fracture of the extended "Clan Langa Langa," two of Kinshasa's leading orchestras simultaneously lost key members to a common destination. From Viva La Musica, the ensemble led by the singer and style-setter Papa Wemba, four prominent musicians announced their departure. These were the guitarist Beniko Popolipo and three vocalists: Djuna Djanana, Dindo Yogo, and Espérant Kisangani. The departure of Espérant was particularly notable: he had been an early member of Viva La Musica, had previously left the group to join the rival outfit Karawa Musica, and had subsequently returned to Papa Wemba's fold before defecting a second and final time. Almost simultaneously, three celebrated members of Zaïko Langa Langa, from which Viva La Musica itself had originally branched, also tendered their resignations. These were the vocalist and showman Evoloko Jocker, singer Bozi Boziana, and the bassist Bolenge Djo Mali. A seventh figure had been expected to join the new venture. The singer Kester Emeneya, then a member of Viva La Musica, was reportedly invited to participate in the formation. However, Emeneya withdrew from the plan after concluding that Evoloko was in fact the group's sole and hidden authority figure, that the collective leadership model was a facade concealing a de facto one-man directorship. Persuaded by this assessment, Emeneya chose to remain with Viva La Musica.

The orchestration of such a simultaneous double defection inevitably prompted suspicions about the involvement of Verckys Kiamuangana Mateta, one of the most powerful and well-connected figures in the Kinshasa music industry. Verckys was widely regarded as a kingmaker in the local music business, capable of launching, sustaining, or toppling an orchestra's fortunes.

Numerous observers and commentators accused Verckys of having engineered both defections from behind the scenes, deliberately weakening Zaïko Langa Langa and Viva La Musica in order to assemble a group of exceptional talents under his own production umbrella. Verckys denied these allegations categorically. According to his own account, the musicians had approached him independently, seeking assistance and guidance. He claimed to have held back from intervening until it became apparent that no reconciliation with their former groups was forthcoming, at which point he agreed to support the formation of the new ensemble.

The resulting alliance between Verckys and the dissidents gave birth to a group that would carry the name Langa Langa Stars, an echo of Zaïko Langa Langa, from which three of its founding members had come, recast in a new and starrier configuration.

==== Early recording sessions and releases, arrival of Roxy Tshimpaka ====
The newly formed Langa Langa Stars moved swiftly into the recording studio in late 1981. These early sessions produced a substantial catalogue of titles, including "Tantine Betena", "Avenir Mbeya Mbeya", "Tête Africaine", "La Mignonne", and "Bakutu," among others. A selection of these early recordings was compiled and issued as a 33 rpm album released under the Veve label: Verckys Présente Langa Langa Stars Vol. 1, which appeared before the end of 1981.

The group continued its productive relationship with Veve throughout 1982, generating further recordings and seeing additional releases enter circulation. During this period the group's ranks were progressively broadened. At some point in the middle of 1982, Roxy Tshimpaka, the 7th patron and last of the notable outsiders from the Zaïko Langa Langa orbit, departed his former group and joined Langa Langa Stars. Two more albums appeared: Danse Weke Weke Vol. 2 and Verckys Présente Les 7 Patrons De L'Orchestre Langa-Langa Stars, the latter title making explicit the group's unusual governance structure and the equal standing of its seven founding principals, a marketing claim that would, in time, prove increasingly at odds with reality. Among the titles recorded in 1982 were "Azanga", "Parapluie", "Requiem", and "Péché Mortel," songs that were circulated through additional album releases and helped sustain the group's visibility across Kinshasa and beyond.

Also joining the group around this time was Ben Nyamabo, a singer who had returned to Kinshasa following a period of residence in Italy, during which he had also engaged in recording activity. Ben brought with him a network of contacts and resources developed during his time in Europe, including his ownership and management of a luxury boutique called Scarpa Uomo, through which he supplied the musicians with finely tailored Italian clothing.

==== 1982-83 European tour ====
Toward the end of 1982, Langa Langa Stars embarked on their first major European tour, a landmark moment for any Congolese orchestra of the era and a testament to the group's already considerable reputation. The tour, however, was complicated by a diplomatic problem affecting Bozi Boziana: a dispute with an embassy had resulted in Bozi being placed in a situation of persona non grata, effectively barring him from travel. He was consequently unable to join the initial touring party. A number of members remained behind in Kinshasa for unrelated reasons, among them Petit Cachet Ndjoli, Dada Kome, Teddy Accompa, Carol Mankamba, and Edi Mabungu. The group that departed for Europe was therefore a partial one, comprising Evoloko Jocker, Dindo Yogo, Espérant Djengaka, Djuna Djanana, Djo Mali, Roxy Tshimpaka, Anto Denewade, and Aimedo Star Nyura. Bozi Boziana subsequently resolved his visa situation and rejoined the group in January 1983, travelling to Europe to link up with his colleagues mid-tour.

During the course of the tour, two members, Aimedo Star Nyura and Anto Denewade, chose to remain in Switzerland rather than return to Kinshasa with the rest of the group.

=== 1983–1984: Internal conflicts and departure wave ===
==== Formation of Choc Stars ====
Upon returning from Europe, Langa Langa Stars entered a period of increasing internal tension. At the centre of the conflict was the question of the group's financial management and its relationship with Verckys and the Éditions Veve production apparatus. Ben Nyamabo, who had by now become closely aligned with both Evoloko Jocker and Bozi Boziana, proposed a bold move aimed at securing the group's artistic and commercial independence: purchasing a new set of instruments imported from Italy and severing the group's contractual ties with Verckys. Both Evoloko and Bozi initially expressed support for this plan, and Ben proceeded on the assumption of a shared commitment. The project was, however, fatally undermined when Evoloko changed his position and informed Verckys of the scheme, effectively denouncing Ben Nyamabo to the very patron they had been planning to break free from.

Verckys reacted swiftly and forcefully, summarily dismissing Ben Nyamabo from the group. Ben, incensed by the turn of events, demanded immediate reimbursement for the clothing he had supplied to the musicians through his Scarpa Uomo boutique. When his 48-hour ultimatum passed without response, he carried out his threat to have the musical instruments stored at Evoloko's premises seized by the authorities. Ben subsequently brought legal proceedings against Verckys before a Kinshasa tribunal.

The crisis triggered a formal intervention by Verckys. Convening a meeting at the Veve Center, he announced a reorganisation of the group's official structure, naming Evoloko Jocker as president of Langa Langa Stars. This decision, which effectively confirmed and formalised what many had long suspected about the actual locus of power within the group, proved unacceptable to three of the seven founding "patrons." Bozi Boziana, Espérant Kisangani, and Roxy Tshimpaka all departed the group in response, unwilling to operate under what they regarded as Evoloko's unilateral authority. The departures triggered a period of near-inactivity for Langa Langa Stars. The group was profoundly weakened by the loss of three of its most prominent vocalists and by the lingering financial and interpersonal fallout of the Ben Nyamabo episode. The ensemble that had launched with such fanfare in late 1981 now found itself diminished and in need of significant reconstruction.

Ben Nyamabo made contact first with Roxy Tshimpaka and subsequently with Bozi Boziana, who had by this time settled in Europe and remained deeply critical of the manner in which Evoloko had come to dominate the group. Ben proposed that they join forces to create an entirely new ensemble. The prospect appealed to Bozi, who agreed to return to Kinshasa to help realise the project. The outcome of their collaboration was the formation of Choc Stars, which would go on to become one of the pre-eminent rumba groups of the mid-to-late 1980s.

A joint album between Langa Langa Stars and Choc Stars was released by Verckys in 1983, including "Moyeke" and "Nzembo Elengi" performed by Langa Langa Stars.

==== Centralized leadership ====
Among the original seven, three had chosen to remain with Langa Langa Stars in the wake of the restructuring crisis: Dindo Yogo, Djuna Djanana, and Djo Mali. Their continued presence provided a degree of continuity and credibility, and the group pressed on with recordings during the period. However, 1984 brought a further wave of departures that would definitively alter the character of the ensemble.

Dindo Yogo followed Beniko Popolipo, who had in the meantime rejoined Zaïko Langa Langa, to the same orchestra, leaving Langa Langa Stars without one of its most celebrated original vocalists. His departure represented a significant blow to the remaining collective identity of the group. Espérant Kisangani, who had already left the Langa Langa Stars administration following the Veve Center confrontation, attempted during 1984 to establish himself in Europe, departing Kinshasa in pursuit of opportunities there.

The final blow came toward the end of 1984. Djuna Djanana and Djo Mali, the last two of the original seven still nominally within the Langa Langa Stars structure, were accused of breaching the terms of their contract with Verckys and Éditions Veve by participating in a recording session outside the official framework. The allegation was disputed and generated considerable public discussion in Kinshasa's music circles. When the dispute was eventually resolved, both Djuna Djanana and Djo Mali chose to join Choc Stars, completing the absorption of the original dissident collective into the rival organisation.

By the end of 1984, of the original seven "patrons" who had lent the group its extraordinary initial profile, only Evoloko Jocker remained. The Langa Langa Stars had passed irrevocably from being a collective enterprise to being, in effect, Evoloko's personal vehicle.

=== 1984–1987: Evoloko's reconstruction of Langa Langa Stars ===
Before the succession of major departures had run its course, the group had already made provision for a degree of continuity by maintaining a parallel roster of younger, less prominent performers. This second team, composed of vocalists who performed at concerts but did not initially participate in studio recordings, included Teddy Bukasa and Jerry Lungoyo among others. Their role had been primarily that of understudies and live support, supplementing the performances of the senior members without challenging their pre-eminence.

In the wake of the major departures, some of these younger singers stepped up to fill the void in the recording studio. Jerry Lungoyo and Kolo Makambo Système participated in the recording of "Moyeke" and "Nzembo Elengi" and contributed to the 1983 album Likombe.

Evoloko Jocker embarked on a programme of reconstruction. He recruited a series of new members drawn from various corners of the Kinshasa music scene, seeking both to fill the gaps left by departing veterans and to introduce new energy and ideas into the ensemble. Among the earliest new arrivals was Basile Mazeya Leya, who came from Face à Face, a group associated with the Cabaret Liyoto entertainment complex. Also joining at this stage were vocalist Apo Dallas, guitarist Mozin Malanda, percussionist Célé Mbonda, and vocalist Djunafa Makengele. These new recruits began the process of giving the reconstituted Langa Langa Stars a fresh identity, distinct from the original collective and centred more explicitly on Evoloko's leadership.

A further round of additions followed. Evoloko brought in Koko Anana, a vocalist with roots in Historia Musica, bassist Bibisha Mukuna and additional vocalists, including Dicky Roi, as well. With this new formation in place, Evoloko and the reformed Langa Langa Stars recorded and released the album Eliyo. The album featured a notable collaboration: the track "Bedadi" was recorded featuring Pépé Kallé. Toward the end of 1984, the reconstituted group recorded two further songs: "KO Debout" and "Kalolo".

The reconstruction of Langa Langa Stars continued into 1985 and 1986 with additional personnel changes. The vocalist Letouchana, who had previously been associated with Viva La Musica, was recruited. Bassist Matra Wamba, formerly of Orchestre Stukas, joined alongside drummer Vechiko Mutombo. Mutombo would later achieve popular recognition in a different field, becoming well known as a comedian under the stage name Tatu Kalombo. With this configuration, Langa Langa Stars recorded the songs "Rosa Ya Paris" and "Communiqué Fula Fula" before moving on to full album projects in 1986. The resulting releases, Momo and La Belle De Bangui, featured the title track alongside "Done" and "Sika".

The album Done Bis, released toward the end of 1986 after an African tour, proved to be among the most successful of the group's post-reconstruction releases. The title track achieved a particularly wide circulation and considerable popular success across Africa. In early 1987, the group undertook a European tour. In November of the same year, the group was scheduled as part of a programme alongside Tabu Ley Rochereau at events in Brazil, marking an expansion of the group's international profile into South American territories.

=== 1988–1995: Inactivity, launch of Evoloko Jocker's solo career ===
Despite the partial commercial success of these years, the challenges of sustaining an active orchestra in Kinshasa, managing personnel, satisfying contractual obligations, navigating an often unpredictable music market, and balancing the competing demands of domestic and European audiences, gradually wore down even Evoloko's considerable resolve. Following in the footsteps of the musicians who had preceded him, Evoloko began to spend increasing amounts of time in Paris, where the Congolese music scene had established a thriving base during the 1980s.

Though he continued to perform and record under the Langa Langa Stars name, the operational reality of the group in this period diverged significantly from its earlier incarnation as a full-time Kinshasa-based collective. By the latter half of the decade, Evoloko was working primarily with session musicians, assembling ad hoc ensembles for specific recording projects rather than maintaining a stable permanent roster. In approximately 1988, Evoloko formalised his transition to a solo artist with the release of the album La Carte Qui Gagne, which marked his debut as a credited solo performer.

Throughout the 1990s, Evoloko Jocker operated primarily from Europe, with Paris serving as his principal base of activity. The full orchestral format that had characterised Langa Langa Stars at its 1980s peak became progressively less operational as a permanent touring ensemble. In its place, the name functioned increasingly as a branding vehicle, a recognised banner under which Evoloko could pursue recording projects, occasional collaborations, and selective live appearances without the logistical burden of maintaining a large and stable permanent lineup. Despite the reduced scale of operations, the decade nonetheless produced releases of genuine note under the Langa Langa Stars name: Kinshasa Brazza Boyoka! and Mingelina B52 both appeared in 1991, on the Flash Diffusion Business label. This release attracted particular attention for its collaborations, which included tracks featuring Papa Wemba. Megamix Vol. 1 and Lydia appeared respectively in 1993 and 1994 without the "Langa Langa Stars" name but featured members of the last lineup of the band.

=== 2000–2026: Return to Kinshasa and subsequent releases ===
In 2004, Evoloko Jocker returned to Kinshasa, seeking to reconnect with his roots and to revive the group's fortunes in the Congolese domestic market. Around 2006, he undertook a formal attempt to reconstitute the ensemble under the name Langa Langa Stars Rénové (Renewed), a designation that acknowledged both continuity with the original project and the necessity of a fresh start. Evoloko continued to record and perform into subsequent years, sustaining his artistic presence and maintaining the connection to Langa Langa Stars that remained the foundation of his public identity, releasing albums Epître 1er (Soit You Soit Me) in 2002, La Route à Suivre in 2007, Déjà Déjà in 2015 and standalone releases in the 2020s.

== Discography ==
=== Studio albums ===
- Verckys Présente Langa Langa Stars Vol. 1 (1981)
- Verckys Présente Langa Langa Stars Vol. 2 (also known as Danse Weke Weke, 1982)
- Verckys Présente Les 7 Patrons De L’Orchestre Langa-Langa Stars (1982)
- Soleil (1983)
- Likombe (1983)
- Verckys Présente Langa Langa Stars et Choc Stars (1983)
- KO Debout (1984)
- Eliyo (1984)
- La Belle De Bangui (1985)
- Momo (also known as Momo Swing Swing, 1985)
- Done Bis (1986)
- Langa Langa Stars à leur meilleur niveau à Paris Vol. 1 (1987)
- Langa Langa Stars à leur meilleur niveau à Paris Vol. 2 (1987)
- Le retour de Djuna Djanana (1988)
- Kinshasa Brazza Boyoka! (1991, credited to Evoloko Jocker & Langa Langa Stars)
- Mingelina B52 (1991)
- Langa Langa Stars International in Paris (1992)
- Déjà Déjà (2015)
