= Stino Mubi =

Congolese musician (born 1966)

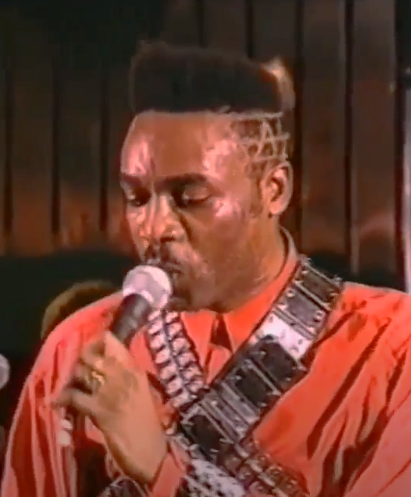
- Mubi in 1993

Background information
- Born: Justin Mubi Matadi; January 16, 1966 (age 60); Kikwit, Bandundu Province, Democratic Republic of the Congo
- Genres: Congolese rumba; funk; pop
- Occupations: Singer; songwriter; composer; performer
- Years active: 1984–present
- Labels: Mayala; Éditions Kaluila; Ngoyarto; JPS
- Formerly of: Viva La Musica
- Spouse: Marie-Jeanne Ngoyi (m. 1985)

Justin Mubi Matadi (born 16 January 1966), known professionally as Stino Mubi, is a Congolese singer-songwriter, composer, and performer. Nicknamed "L'As de la Chorale" ("The Ace of the Choir") in 1984, he successfully auditioned to join Viva La Musica, a Congolese rumba band led by Papa Wemba. He became known for vocal range and sound fusing Congolese rumba with Western pop, funk, and soul. Over a career spanning more than four decades, Stino established himself as one of the emblematic artists of his era, achieving success as a member of Viva La Musica and as a solo performer.

His compositions such as "M.J. Ngoyi" and "Roméo et Juliette" are considered modern classics of Congolese music, while his stage style, inspired by Michael Jackson, introduced new performance aesthetics to the rumba scene.

== Early life and career ==
=== 1966–1984: Childhood, education and musical debut ===
Justin Mubi Matadi was born on 16 January 1966, in Kikwit, a provincial town in the Bandundu Province, in the Democratic Republic of the Congo, to Rosa Ikuma and Boni Mubi. He comes from a family with roots in the Mbala and Yansi ethnic groups. Though Kikwit is distant from Kinshasa, it had a thriving cultural scene, with traditional music playing a significant role in local events. As a child, Justin grew up surrounded by these sounds as well as Congolese rumba. His father's professional career required the family to move to Kinshasa when Justin was still young. There, Justin became an admirer of Viva La Musica, the band formed by Papa Wemba in 1977.

Although Mubi's passion for music was obvious, his father insisted that he first complete his education before considering a professional artistic career. He enrolled at the Ngolo Za Bambuta Institute, where he studied business administration. Only after receiving his diploma was he allowed to pursue music seriously. In the early 1980s, he adopted the stage name "Stino", derived from the ending of his given name Justin, and began performing in local groups.

=== 1984–1990: Joining Viva La Musica and Femme Sans Bijoux ===
Mubi's first significant professional engagement came with Chic-Chic Matonge, a Kinshasa local band led by Djo Eph. The band was often invited to open for bigger acts, including Viva La Musica. In 1984, Papa Wemba announced auditions to recruit new members for Viva La Musica. The band had lost King Kester Emeneya two years earlier, when the singer left to form his own group, Victoria Eleison, and Wemba was seeking to reinforce his vocal lineup. Stino, young and shy, impressed Papa Wemba and the Viva entourage, known as the village Molokai, and he was invited to join the group. During a concert, he was nicknamed "L'As de La Chorale" ("The Ace of the Choir") by Wemba.

By 1986, Viva La Musica was expanding internationally, embarking on tours of Europe and Japan. Stino, however, was not included in the touring contingent and remained in Kinshasa alongside singer Gloria Tukhadio and drummer Richacha "Yende" Balengola. Rather than remain inactive, they joined forces with former Viva La Musica singer Maray Maray temporarily in his band Rumba Ray. It was during this time that Stino composed one of his most breakout works, "M.J. Ngoyi", dedicated to his girlfriend and later wife, Marie-Jeanne Ngoyi.

In 1987, Papa Wemba made the strategic decision to relocate to Paris, seeking to establish Viva La Musica on the international stage. French producers encouraged him to streamline the band to a core of twelve musicians for this new chapter. Among those chosen was Stino. Over the next two years, he performed with Molokai, Wemba's international backing band, accompanying Papa Wemba as the band's reputation grew beyond Africa. In 1988, he participated in the promotion of the self-titled album Papa Wemba, produced by Martin Meissonnier, which introduced the band's sound to a global audience by fusing Congolese rumba with elements of world music and pop. For Stino, the experience provided invaluable exposure to international production standards and stagecraft.

To balance the band's international ambitions with the expectations of fans in Zaire, Viva La Musica began encouraging its members to release domestic-oriented projects. In 1989, Mubi recorded and released his first solo album, Femme Sans Bijoux, in Paris. The album included the title track "Femme Sans Bijoux", "Elenge Ya Paris", "Zoulema", and "Tapez 36.15", a re-work of "Mulolo Yikima". The standout track, "M.J. Ngoyi", became a defining song for him, gaining significant popularity in Kinshasa and among the Congolese diaspora in Europe.

=== 1991–2000: Roméo et Juliette, Invitation and Fin d'Exil ===
During this period, Stino began to refine a performance style that blended Congolese rumba with international pop. A self-proclaimed admirer of Michael Jackson, he closely studied Jackson's vocal exclamations, stage gestures, and dance moves. His approach contrasted with the classic presentation of Congolese singers and signaled the growing influence of global pop culture on Kinshasa's stage scene.

Viva La Musica faced internal tensions regarding salaries, as the growing number of musicians made it increasingly difficult to ensure equitable compensation. In October 1992, Stino briefly aligned with singer Lidjo Kwempa and drummer Awilo Longomba to form a splinter band called Nouvelle Génération de la République Démocratique, but he quickly withdrew and stayed with Viva La Musica. In the same period, he embarked on his second solo project, Roméo et Juliette. Recording sessions began in the United States, with arrangements by Bongo Wende and Shakara Mutela, and were later completed in Paris. The album was released in early 1994 under Éditions Kaluila. It blended rumba with funk, pop, and new jack swing. The record included Papa Wemba, Gloria Tukhadio, Richacha Balengola, Djeffard Lukombo, Dodo Munoko and many others. Songs such as "Roméo et Juliette", "Mista", and "Tanya" became hits. Ndosi, meaning "dream" in Mbala, paid homage to his cultural roots. The album was groundbreaking in its use of visual media. Almost all the tracks were given professional video clips produced by SiCa Production, making Roméo et Juliette one of the first Congolese albums to fully embrace video promotion.

In 1993–1994, he participated in Peter Gabriel's Secret World Tour, performing alongside Papa Wemba and fellow Viva La Musica singer Reddy Amisi. In December 1998, Stino released his third solo album, Invitation, under the Ngoyarto label. The project featured collaborations with JB Mpiana, Bozi Boziana, Papa Wemba, and Madilu System in tracks such as "Portugaise", "15 Ans Ya Monzemba", and "Arthur Nzemene". By the late 1990s, the Congolese music scene was dominated by the ndombolo wave. Both Stino and his fellow Viva La Musica alumnus Reddy Amisi incorporated it into their albums. Papa Wemba, however, publicly disapproved, dismissing Invitation and Reddy's Étoile as excessively commercial. This criticism led Stino and Reddy to consider recording a joint project to prove their artistic seriousness. The collaboration was fraught with disagreements, but it ultimately produced the album Fin d'exil, released in 2000 by JPS Production, with Rigo Star as artistic director. Although the project was turbulent, it represented Stino's last major contribution to the Viva La Musica orbit. His final appearance with Papa Wemba came in 1999, when he participated in the recording of the album M'zee Fula Ngenge.

== Solo career ==
In 2001 Stino departed from Viva La Musica and largely withdrew from recording. For more than fifteen years, he concentrated on live performances and collaborations but did not release new solo albums. He performed in LSC, Saint Denis on 19 October 2002. In 2022, he signaled a comeback with the singles "Melina la Parisienne" (a re-work of Papa Wemba's song) and the original composition "Parigo". Three years later, on 8 March 2025, he released "+243 I Love You Congo", a patriotic single dedicated to the Armed Forces of the Democratic Republic of the Congo (FARDC). Around this time, he formed a new backing band based in Kinshasa and relaunched his career with a major comeback concert held on 12 July 2025.

== Discography ==
=== Studio albums ===
- Femme Sans Bijoux (1989)
- Roméo et Juliette (1994)
- Invitation (1998)
- Fin d'Exil (2000) – with Reddy Amisi

=== Singles ===
- "Mélina la Parisienne" (2022)
- "Parigo" (2022)
- "+243 I Love You Congo" (2025)
