= Richacha Balengola =

Congolese musician

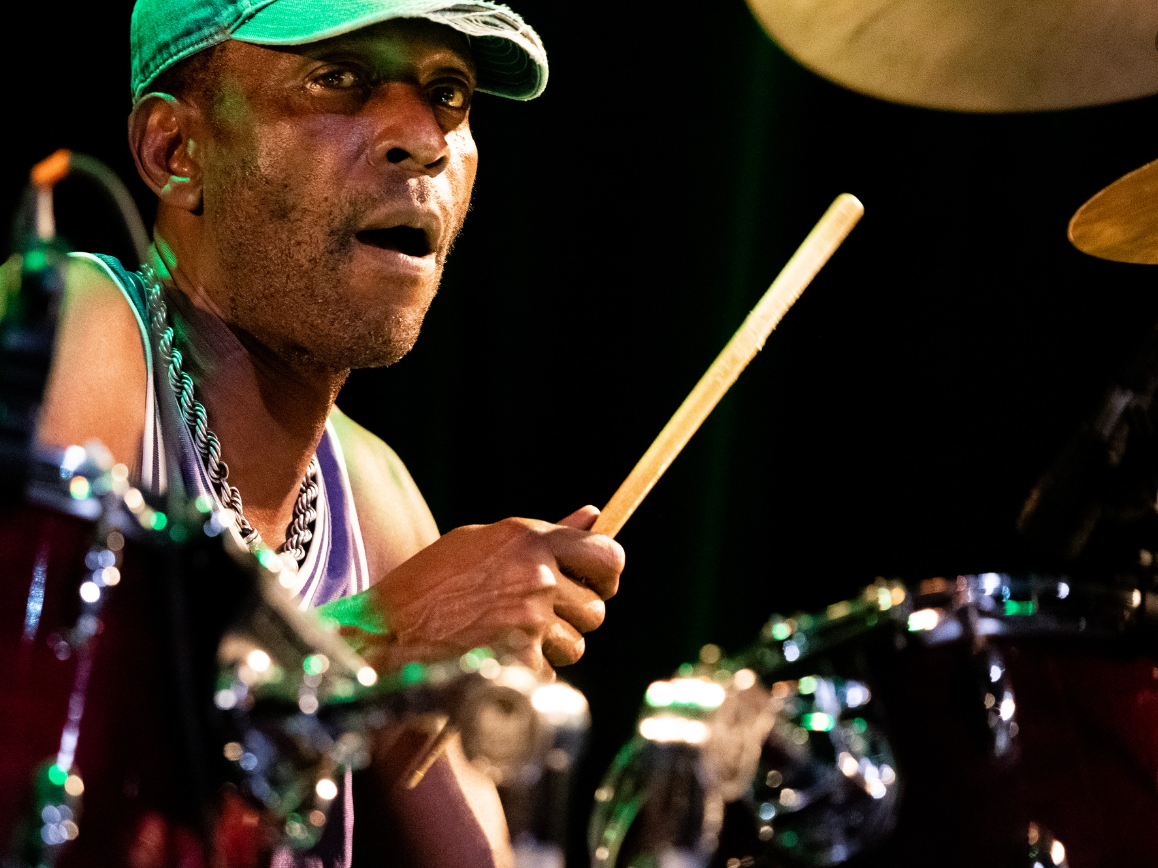

Background information
- Born: Richard Yende Abongy Balengola; December 22, 1964 (age 61); Mbandaka, DR Congo
- Genres: Congolese rumba; reggae; world music
- Occupation: Musician
- Instrument: Drums
- Years active: 1980–present
- Formerly of: Viva La Musica, The Wailers Band

Richard Yende Abongy Balengola, best known as Richacha "Chacha" Balengola, is a reggae, Hip Hop, RnB, soukous and world music drummer from the Democratic Republic of the Congo, based in Reims, France since 1987.

== Biography ==
Born on December 22, 1964, in Mbandaka, a city on the Congo River in the Democratic Republic of Congo lying near the confluence of the Congo and Ruki Rivers, Balengola started his career as a drummer with a world music band called Ndoki Machine. A Bass player John Pepito Tshimanga (A young man living in the same neighborhood as Papa Wemba; so they knew each other) was part of the band after coming back to Congo (DRC) from Paris, France where he stayed to study. Ndoki Machine's style of music and John Pepito Tshimanga's style of playing bass had nothing to do with soukous. Their style of music was similar to music played by a band from DRC Congo called "Bobongo Stars." Shakara Mutela, a well known bass player from DRC Congo, was among the Bobongo Stars Leaders.

In 1980 Richacha joined "Les Frères Fataki" in a band called Touche pas as a drummer. A well-known singer from this band is Jose Fataki Ndoko who later became part of Viva La Musica and La Nouvelle Génération. In 1982 most of the Viva La Musica Members broke away from Papa Wemba to create Victoria Eleison The Singers who left the band were: King Kester Emeneya, Pepe Bipoli, Joly Mubiala, Debaba El Shabab, the drummer was also part of those who quit with Viva La Musica to form Victoria Eleison Band. Johon Pepito Tshimanga who later became Papa Wemba's bass player after Victoria Eleison had been created, was asked by Papa Wemba if he could bring along with him Ndoki Machine's drummer to join his band. Papa Wemba needed something new in Viva La Musica's style of music; that drummer was Richacha. He became known as a professional drummer in 1980, at the age of 16 when he joined Touche pas.

Despite the fact of having Congolese origins, Richacha had not had a chance of playing with a Soukous and Rumba band permanently until he joined Touche Pas. His last recording session with Viva La Musica was in 1996. He has performed with several major world music, reggae singers and bands including The Hooligans, Pierpoljak, Tonton David, Princess Erika, Max Romeo, Nèg' Marrons, Ijahman Levi, Bisso Na Bisso, Secteur Ä, The Wailers1, Alpha Blondy, Barrington Levy, R.M.I (Reggae Music International), Queen Ifrica, Tony Rebel, etc.

Richacha's mentor was Mando (a former Rochereau Tabu Ley and Afrisa drummer) and was later most inspired by Carlton Barrett (Bob Marley’s drummer). That’s why some songs recorded with Viva La Musica in the late 1980s and beginning of the 1990s have that Reggae Root Snare sound. Richacha did not record a song in Afrisa with Rochereau Tabu Ley but he performed as a drummer during some live concerts in 1979; he was on Drums the day Mbilia Bel was doing her first appearance in Afrisa. Richacha is among Viva la Musica’s Musicians appearing in the movie La Vie est Belle in which the main actor was Papa Wemba. He was acting as a shoe shiner, also as a guitarist during Papa Wemba rehearsal. The movie was released in 1987.

Richacha is a session and performance drummer in Europe with 40 years of experience. He and bassist Junior MacLier formed the backing band Reggae Music International (R.M.I) in Paris, which has provided backing for reggae artists. Richacha also provides drum lessons for students of various skill levels.

Apart from the drums, Richacha plays all percussions and the bass.

A book about Richacha has been released on September 5th 2024. The title is : "The journey of a versatile Drummer - Richacha Balengola". The book can be ordered from Amazon: https://www.amazon.com/dp/B0DGDQJ7VZ?ref_=pe_93986420_774957520

== Discography ==
As a Drummer

1. Max Romeo - Name of album to be determined (2022)
2. Romeo K (2021)
3. Tu shung peng - Dub of light (2020)
4. Isiah Shaka - Roots Reggae Revelation (2019)
5. Isiah Shaka - Jah Vit (2019)
6. Kali Kamga - Ready for Love (2019)
7. Natty Jean - On m'a dit (2018)
8. Kasö - De Paris à Maurice (2017)
9. Wach'da - Jeux de vérité Jeux de vérité (2017)
10. Désiré François - Millionnaire (2017)
11. Sebah - Unir nos forces (2016)
12. Typical Féfé - Reggae (2016)
13. Tu Shung Peng - Wise Stories from Vineyard Town (2015)
14. Lil Kante - Dewi (2014)
15. Scars - Plus aucun doute (2014)
16. Tiwony - Roots rebel (2014)
17. Kananga - No more (2014)
18. Princess Erika - Sur la route du reggae (2014)
19. Hosny and Good Morning Babylones - Every people (2014)
20. Brax - Levez Les Mains (2014 Single)
21. Kasö - Cool (2014 single)
22. Jean-Michel Rotin - (2013 recording session)
23. Ras Daniel & Tu Shung Peng - Ray of Light (2012)
24. Lusdy - (2012 recording session)
25. Tita Nzebi - Métiani (2011)
26. Jah Sidy Boy – Les Droits De La Femme (2011)
27. Elsa Martine Quartet - I Gen Wèy (2011)
28. Charles E. Brown - Ressource Humaine (2010)
29. Takana Zion - Rappel à l'Ordre (2009)
30. Blenda - Operationnel (2009)
31. Bisso Na Bisso - Africa (2009)
32. Kayans Reggae - Revelation Time(2009)
33. Touré Kunda - Santhiaba(2008)
34. Alpha Blondy - Jah Victory (2007)
35. Hosny and Good Morning Babylones - Rasta Rebel (2007)
36. Princess Erika - A l'épreuve du temps (2006)
37. I-Trinity-I - Ca R'Commence (2005)
38. Saël - Ma vision (2005)
39. Touré Kunda – Nité Humanisme
40. Tim Ray Brown - Tradition
41. Touré Kunda – Le Joola, Liaison Ziguinchor-Dakar (2003)
42. Karl Zero and Bob Marley's Wailers - Hi-Fi Calypso (2003)
43. Hosny and Good Morning Babylones - Unité universelle (2002)
44. Various Artists - African Chill (2002)
45. Jacky & Ben J de Nèg' Marrons - Le Bilan (2000)
46. Bisso na Bisso - 15 mai 1999 (1999 [live CD])
47. Bisso na Bisso - Racines (1999)
48. Djamatik - Roots Connections (1999)
49. Bob Marley's Wailers - Live in Jamaica (1999 [live CD])
50. Metal Sound - DJ au top (1998)
51. Secteur A - Secteur A à l'Olympia (1998 [live CD])
52. Hosny - Radical fighters (1997)
53. Pacha and Viva La Musica - Voyage ya poto (1996)
54. Gloria Tukadio and Viva La Musica - History no change (1996)
55. Jose Fataki and La Nouvelle Génération (1996)
56. Papy Ipepi and Viva La Musica (1994)
57. Stino Mubi and Viva La Musica - Romeo et Juliette (1993)
58. Reddy Amisi and Viva La Musica - L’injustice (1993)
59. Espérant Kisangani and Viva La Musica - Paris Match (1993)
60. Malo Kélé Et Les Matouloulous – Le Rythmes De La Brousse (1993)
61. Soukous Stars - Fifie (1991)
62. Lidjo Kwempa and Viva La Musica - Examen(1991)
63. Modogo GFF and Viva La Musica - Statue de la liberté (1991)
64. Papa Wemba and Viva La Musica - Biloko ya moto (Addida Kiesse) (1990)
65. Comme à l’école with Bipoli, Spraya, Luciana and Lidjo Kwempa (1989)
66. Orchestre Rumba Ray (1986)
67. Lidjo Kwempa and Viva La Musica - Lipanda (1986)
68. Papa Wemba and Viva La Musica - Beau gosse ya Paris (1986)
69. Papa Wemba and Viva La Musica - Ma Bijoux (1985)
70. Papa Wemba and Viva La Musica - Rendre à César (1985)
71. Maray-Maray and Rumba Ray - Musulman (1984)
72. Papa Wemba and Viva La Musica - Eliana (1984)
73. Maray-Maray and Viva La Musica - Nana Efiye (1984)
74. Lidjo Kwempa and Viva La Musica - Libonza (1983)
75. Lidjo Kwempa and Viva La Musica - Ceci cela (1983)
76. Luciana Demingongo and Viva La Musica - Ozia (1983)
77. Reddy Amisi and Viva La Musica - Petite Gina (1983)
78. Lidjo Kwempa and Viva La Musica - Mujingile (1982)
79. Les frères Fataki and Touche pas - Mondeke (1980)

== Tours ==
- On tour with Max Romeo in Europe and Africa (2024)
- On tour with Linval Thompson (2023)
- On tour with Max Romeo in Europe (2022)
- On tour with Linval Thompson in France (2019)
- On tour with Anthony B in France (2019)
- On tour with Abdou Day in Europe (2019)
- On tour with Cedric "Congos" Myton in Belgium (2019)
- On tour with Queen Ifrica and Tony Rebel in Europe (2015)
- On tour with Barrington Levy in Europe (2011 to 2014)
- On tour with Pierpoljak and Vin Gordon in France (2013)
- On tour with the Wailers in America, Europe and Australia approximately for ten years
- On tour with Alpha Blondy in America and Europe for three years (2003 to 2006)
- Backed various Reggae Artists with R.M.I (Reggae Music International) band in Europe
- On tour with Ijahman Levi in Europe in 2002 and 2015
- Bisso na bisso (1998 to 1999)
- Princess Erika
- On tour with the Neg Marrons in France (1998)
- On tour with the Hooliganz reggae band in Europe and Jamaica
- On tour with Papa Wemba in Africa, Europe and Japan(1982 to 1996)
- Rochereau Tabu Ley & Afriza (1979)
