= Verckys Kiamuangana Mateta =

Congolese musician and producer (1944–2022)

Verckys Kiamuangana Mateta ONH
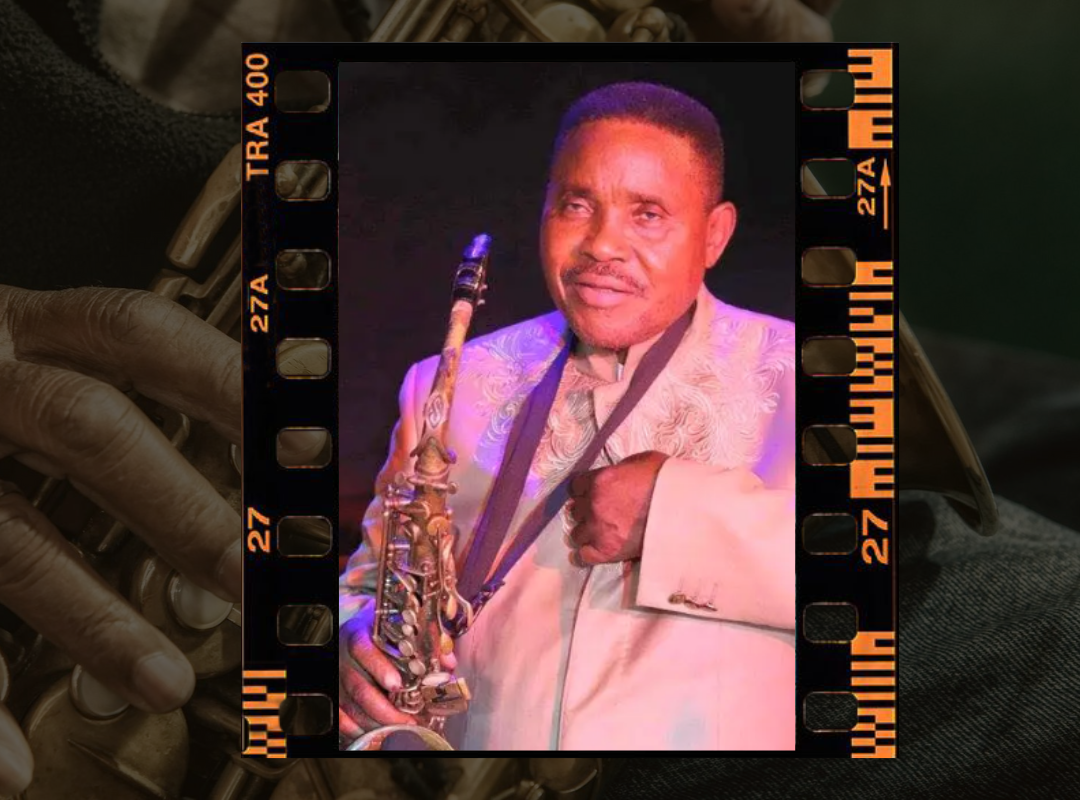
- Verckys in 2021

Background information
- Also known as: Verckys; Vévé; l'homme aux poumons d'acier (the man with the iron lungs); Wazola Nzimbu
- Born: Georges Kiamuangana Mateta; 19 May 1944; Kisantu, Belgian Congo
- Died: 13 October 2022 (aged 78) Kinshasa, Democratic Republic of the Congo
- Genres: Congolese rumba
- Occupations: Saxophonist; songwriter; bandleader; record producer; record executive
- Instrument: Saxophone
- Years active: 1960s–1980s
- Label: Editions Vévé International
- Formerly of: Los Cantina; Jazz Africain; Jamel National; Congo Jazz; Oui Fifi; Conga Succès; OK Jazz; Orchestre Vévé

Georges Kiamuangana Mateta (19 May 1944 – 13 October 2022), known professionally as Verckys, was a Congolese saxophonist, composer, producer, bandleader, and record executive. A significant figure in the evolution of 20th-century Congolese and African popular music, he is referred to as "Vévé", "the man with the iron lungs" and "Wazola Nzimbu". Kiamuangana's record label Éditions Vévé brought many Congolese musicians to prominence, including Zaïko Langa Langa, Koffi Olomide, Empire Bakuba, Afrisa International, OK Jazz, Langa Langa Stars, Victoria Eleison, Historia Musica, Orchestre Kiam, and others.

He began his career with Kinshasa-based band Los Cantina and subsequently performed with several prominent bands, such as Fauvette Kabangu's Jamel National, Paul Ebengo Dewayon's Congo Jazz, Gérard Kazembe's Oui Fifi, and Johnny Bokelo's Conga Succès. He garnered widespread acclaim after joining Franco Luambo's OK Jazz in 1963, where his saxophone solos were central to sebene-driven hits like "Bolingo ya Bougie", "Polo le Chipeur", and "Mokoloya Mitano Na Monaki Yo". He also composed some of OK Jazz's breakout songs, including "Chérie O Changer", "Oh Madame de la Maison", "Mobali Na Ngai", and "Gina Simba Ngai". He left OK Jazz in February 1969 and founded Orchestre Vévé by April of that year. The band quickly emerged as one of Zaire's most commercially successful recording and live acts.

In 1972, Kiamuangana established Kinshasa's most modern recording studio, Vévé Studio, and in 1978, he inaugurated the entertainment complex known as Vévé Centre. He also served as the president of UMUZA (Union des Musiciens Zaïrois), succeeding Franco Luambo at the end of 1978. As his business ventures flourished, Kiamuangana's performance schedule diminished, which ultimately led to Orchestre Vévé's gradual dissolution.

== Early life and career ==
=== 1944–1962: Childhood, education and music debut ===
Georges Kiamuangana Mateta was born on 19 May 1944 in Kisantu, Bas-Congo Province (now Kongo Central), in what was then the Belgian Congo (later the Republic of the Congo, then Zaire, and currently the Democratic Republic of the Congo). He hailed from a wealthy family; his father was a prominent businessman in Léopoldville (now Kinshasa). He began his primary education at Athénée de Ngiri-Ngiri and later completed it at Athénée de Kalina, where he pursued modern humanities. He was attracted to music from a young age and learned the clarinet with Léopoldville's Kimbanguist Brass Band (Fanfare Kimbanguiste). He then polished his skills with help from Isaac Musekiwa, who taught him the saxophone. Taking to the saxophone, he adopted the pseudonym "Verckys", inspired by the American saxophonist King Curtis, after mishearing "Curtis" as "Verckys".

While still a student, Verckys became increasingly enamored with music and devoted himself entirely to it. He ended his education against his father's counsel, who had hoped to send him to Europe for academic pursuits. In 1961, at the age of 17, Verckys began his musical career in the Los Cantina orchestra. He then made a brief appearance in Clari Lutula's Jazz Africain. In 1962, he played and toured with several bands, including Fauvette Kabangu's Jamel National, Paul Ebengo Dewayon's Congo Jazz, Gérard Kazembe's Oui Fifi and Johnny Bokelo's Conga Succès.

=== 1963–February 1969: OK Jazz ===
In 1963, Verckys joined Franco Luambo Makiadi's Ok Jazz, alongside trumpeter Christophe Djali, vocalist Henriette Boranzima, and Dele Pedro. There, he collaborated with Isaac Musekiwa and Dele Pedro, both English-speaking saxophonists who played pivotal roles in the group's brass section. In December of that year, Franco, recognizing Verckys' talent, brought him to Belgium along with Vicky Longomba and Edo Nganga. In Brussels, OK Jazz recorded several tracks including "Mino ya Luambo diamant" and "Lisaso ya kronenbourg". He began performing duets with Musekiwa and Dele Pedro on tracks such as Kwamy's "Bolingo ya Bougie", Luambo's "Polo le Chipeur" and "Mokoloya Mitano Na Monaki Yo". He also delivered solo performances on Michel Boyibanda's "Samba Tokosamba", Vicky Longomba's "Tété Ngelele Eleki Ngai", and Joseph "Mujos" Mulamba's "Tuna Mageda". Verckys achieved prominence with his saxophone solos in Franco's "Course au pouvoir".

While still with OK Jazz, he began composing songs such as "Chérie O Changer", "Mobali Na Ngai", "Madame de la Maison", and "Gina Simba Ngai", and became the band's private secretary. This afforded him insights into the band's recording management and production. In September 1968, Verckys, alongside fellow bandmate Youlou Mabiala, founded the record label Éditions Vévé, named after a reduplication of Verckys' pseudonym and symbolized by a saxophone logo. Éditions Vévé released six records, though Verckys insisted they were entirely independent of OK Jazz. These recordings, which included Verckys' "Mbula Ekoya Tokozongana" and "Nakopesa Yo Motema", as well as Mabiala's "Billy Ya Ba Fiancés" and Simaro Lutumba's "Okokoma Mokrisstu", were future's side project. In December of that year, during Verckys' stay in Brussels with Franco, it was revealed that the six Vévé records had been illicitly recorded by nzonzing (moonlighting) musicians under exclusive contract with OK Jazz. Verckys clandestinely transported the tapes there, where he also recorded for Decca Records France (a subsidiary of Decca Records) with Franco, who assured him that compensation would follow. Determined not to return empty-handed, Verckys absconded on the day of departure and, having purloined Franco's contacts, entrusted his tapes to a publisher, receiving a generous advance with which he acquired two cars. Franco later uncovered the deception and, following his investigation, dismissed Kiamuangana from OK Jazz. However, Franco later renegotiated Verckys' reinstatement in exchange for 40 percent of the profits from the unauthorized recordings. This arrangement was short-lived, and Verckys eventually severed his affiliation with OK Jazz in February 1969, parting ways with Mabiala, who opted to remain with Franco.

=== April 1969–1973: Orchestre Vévé and other ventures ===
After his departure, Verckys founded Orchestre Vévé in Kinshasa on 5 April 1969, named after his record label. The band debuted publicly in June at the Vis-à-Vis bar, with his image featured on each release as a marketing strategy. The lineup included vocalist Sinatra Bonga Tsekabu (Saak Saakul) and bassist Jim. They quickly gained widespread acclaim with hits such as Verckys' "Mfumbwa" and "Bankoko Baboyi" (inspired by a traffic accident), as well as Saak Saakul's "Fifi Solange". Other records from this period include included "Ekuile Ferros", "Bolingo Florence", "Linga Ngai Zuwa Te", and "Ah Mokili", among others. During the same year, he recruited Congo-Brazzaville vocalist Marcel Loko Massengo, also known as Djeskain. The lineup expanded to include vocalists Kelly Makiadi, José Bébé, Bovick Ye Bondo, guitarist Danila, saxophonist Maproco, and Lubumbashi-born singer Mario Matadidi.

In 1971, Verckys transformed record production by releasing "Mfumbwa 1st" and "Mfumbwa 2nd", dividing a 45 rpm record into melodic and dance sections instead of two separate songs, a model that was soon adopted by other bands and widely credited with transforming Congolese record production, as it was the only industry worldwide to produce only one title per record instead of two. In 1972, Sinatra, Djeskain, and Mario left Orchestre Vévé to form Sosoliso, named after Mario Matadidi song, and adopted the name Ma-Dje-Si from the initials of their names. That year, Pépé Kallé was contracted by Éditions Vévé and lent his lead vocals, alongside José Bébé, to Verckys' polemic hit "Nakomitunaka", which was a scathing response to the Catholic Church's staunch opposition to President Mobutu Sese Seko's Authenticité campaign. The lyrics, which questioned why saints depicted in religious iconography were exclusively white, sparked outrage in the Catholic Church and the Congolese Christian community, and ultimately led to Verckys' excommunication. However, "Nakomitunaka" enjoyed substantial airplay on La Voix du Zaïre television per Mobutu's regime's directive. Verckys then donated musical equipment to the band Bella-Bella, which recruited Pépé Kallé, and later that year, founded Vévé Studio on Eyala Avenue in Kasa-Vubu, Kinshasa, and opened the Zadis Store at Place de la Victoire in Kalamu, Kinshasa.

Orchestre Vévé proceeded to release a series of hits like "Fifi" and "Ndona" by Kelly, and "Sex Vévé" and "Gilmo" by Juslain Makanga. During this phase, Verckys himself wrote several hits "Sakumuna", "Béa", "Baboyaka Mbongo", "Marcelline", "Nandimi Motema", "L'Afrique aux Africains", "Sanza Esili Te", "Nzoto Ya Chance", "Mbondi Ya Libala", "Mobutu the Helmsman", "Denise", "Naleli Nani", "Zonga Vonvon", among others. Other band members also contributed: "Baloba Yo Mbongo Mingi", "Natuni Namemi Ngambo", "Lina Mapendo", "Sosoliso", "Lucie Nakoloba Nini", and "Moïse ou Anne" by Mario Matadidi; "Sois Sage" and "Reste Avec Moi" by Bovick Ye Bondo; "Marcello Tozongana" and "Pronostics" by Sinatra Bonga; "Loboko", "José Okosambwa", and "Mita Yeba Ngai" by Djeskain Loko; and "Isabo" by Kelly Makiadi.

=== 1974–1987: from James Brown's endorsement to formation of new orchestras ===
In 1974, James Brown, who performed at the three-day Zaire 74 music festival, anointed Verckys "Mister Dynamite" after seeing one of his live performances. Orchestre Vévé embarked on a two-month tour in Kenya. That year, Éditions Vévé commenced the issuance of 45 rpm vinyl records and extended support to various prominent bands such as Zaïko Langa Langa, Grands Maquisards, and others. Éditions Vévé was officially renamed Zadis (Zaïroise du disque) in 1976. Around this time, Orchestre Vévé issued the tracks "Papy Baruti" and "Muana Mburu", composed by Francis Bitsoumani, alias Celi Bitsou, with the latter enjoying considerable success. The band's composition during this period included Tino Muinkwa, Djo Roy, Nejos Tusevo, Pepitho Fukiau on vocals; Lambion on lead guitar; Aladji Baba on accompaniment; Ndolo and Celi Bitsou on bass; Bayard on drums; Ponta Vickys on tumba; Verckys, Dibuidi, and Sax Matalanza on saxophone; and Makamba on trombone. Following the success of "Muana Mburu", Celi Bitsou departed from Orchestre Vévé to pursue a solo career. After a period of inactivity, Verckys revitalized the band in 1985 and appointed Dizzy Mandjeku as artistic director. He participated in the band's reformation and enlisted Diatho Lukoki, Jo Mpoy, Sonama, and Michel Sax. Luciana De Mingongo transitioned from Viva La Musica to join Orchestre Vévé, replacing Jo Mpoy, who returned to OK Jazz with Dizzy. Verckys also recruited Elba Kuluma, Serge Kiambukuta Nlemvo, Assi Kapela, Rochesi, and Lawi. Luciana departed after three months. Orchestre Vévé released the track "Monsieur Raison", which saw notable success.

In 1978, Verckys inaugurated an entertainment complex, Vévé Center, which evolved into a cultural epicenter that hosted performances from Kinshasa bands such as Grand Zaïko Wa Wa, Langa Langa Stars, Victoria Eleison, Mbonda Africa, Afro International, Kola la sommité, and Wenge Musica. That year, he also oversaw the recording, production, and distribution of "Sango Ndambu", "Asso", "Samba Samba", "Synza", and "Anibo" by Koffi Olomide, with "Anibo" becoming the year's breakthrough hit. In 1980, Zadis was renamed Éditions Vévé International (EVVI), and continuing its support for various musicians like Zaïko Langa Langa, Koffi Olomide, Empire Bakuba, Afrisa International, TPOK Jazz, Taz Bolingo, Tiers-Monde, Franck Lassan, Grand Zaïko Wa Wa, Langa Langa Stars, Victoria Eleison, Mbonda Africa, Afro International, Kola the luminary, Vonga Aye, and others.

In October 1981, Verckys assembled a new band composed of Evoloko Joker, Bozi Boziana, and Djo Mali, dissidents from Zaïko Langa Langa, alongside Dindo Yogo, Espérant Kisangani, Djuna Djanana wa Mpanga, and King Kester Emeneya, dissidents from Papa Wemba's Viva La Musica. They formed the Langa Langa Stars, though Kester Emeneya was later excluded from the leadership. In 1982, Verckys welcomed 12 musicians who had left Viva La Musica, which led to the formation of the Victoria Eleison orchestra. He provided them with instruments and produced their works, as well as Bozi Boziana's Anti-Choc. That same year, he established the multinational Vévé and launched Izason (Industrie Zaïroise du Son) in 1984.

=== 1988–2022: from UMUZA's presidency to president of SOCODA ===
In 1988, after Vicky Longomba's death, Verckys assumed the presidency of UMUZA (Union des Musiciens Zaïrois). He restructured the office and instituted a section dedicated to liaising with Soneca and managing musicians' social circumstances alongside another section focused on musicians' professional relations. In May 1995, he was unanimously re-elected as UMUZA president by the collective membership. Following the incursion of Laurent-Désiré Kabila's Alliance of Democratic Forces for the Liberation of Congo-Zaire (AFDL) into Kinshasa in May 1997, which led to the expulsion of Mobutu and Kabila's subsequent self-proclamation as president on 17 May, the country was renamed the Democratic Republic of the Congo, and Union Des Musiciens Zaïrois was renamed Union des Musiciens Congolais (UMUCO). In 1998, Verckys presided over UMUCO alongside Tabu Ley Rochereau, Zatho Kinzonzi, and Philippe Kanza. Throughout his tenure, he personally and financially supported the funerals of deceased musicians.

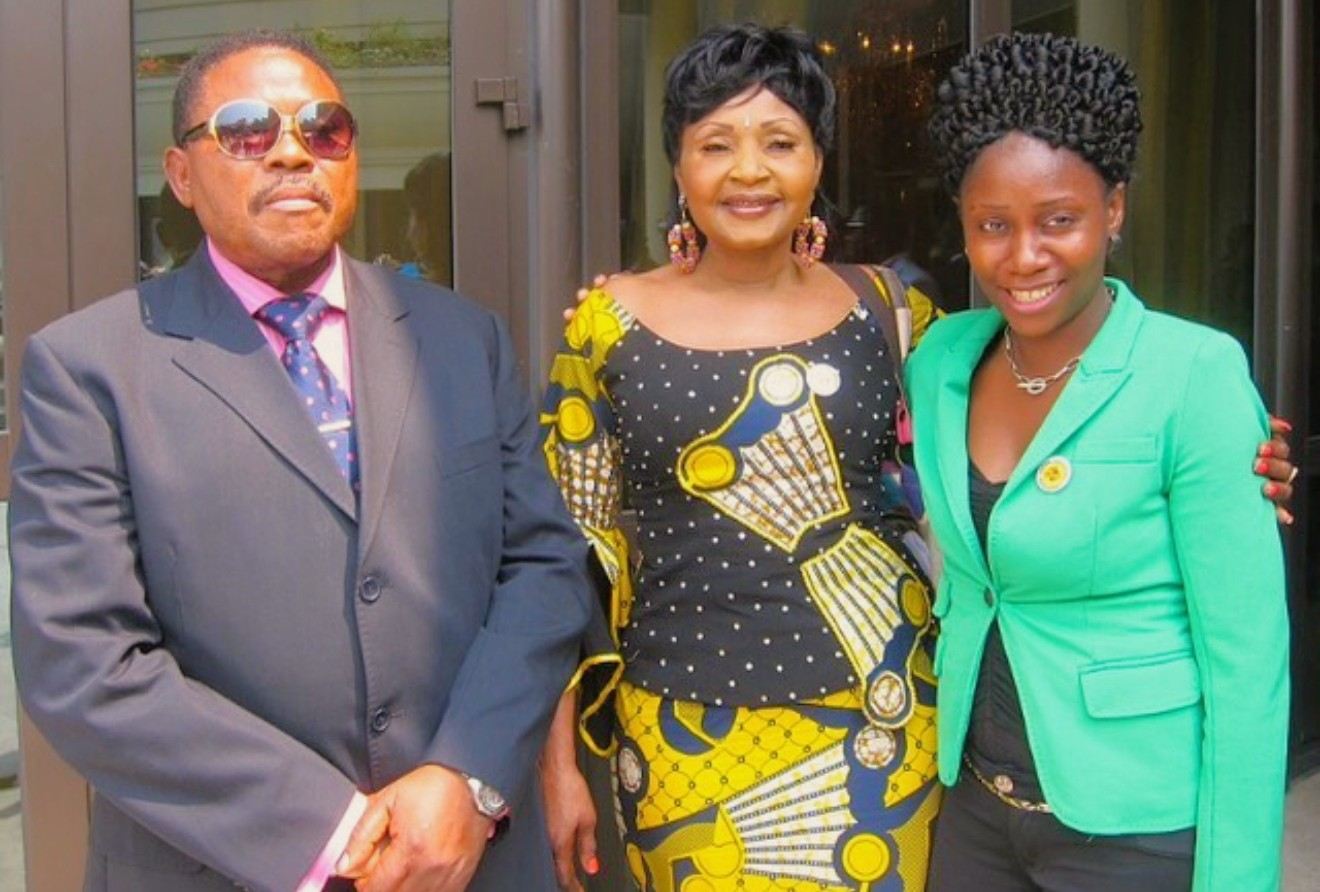
Verckys with Mbilia Bel (center) in May 2019

On 15 December 2001, Verckys-led delegation and Christian musicians submitted a memorandum to Kinshasa's provincial government that opposed the installation of a police container at Place des Artistes in Kalamu, which honors deceased artists. They also raised concerns about post-concert insecurity and armed robberies. In February 2005, Verckys participated in a reconciliation meeting at Maïsha Park in Gombe, Kinshasa, led by Tshala Muana and Koffi Olomide. The gathering included symbolic reunions between rivals like Olomide and Félix Wazekwa, as well as JB Mpiana and Werrason. President Joseph Kabila endorsed the effort and donated $15,000 for transportation, but disputes over fund distribution caused Verckys, King Kester Emeneya, Werrason, Tabu Ley Rochereau, and others to withdraw. In March 2005, UMUCO engaged with the Office des Douanes et Accises (OFIDA) to address widespread music piracy, which marked the first formal contact between musicians and the relevant state agency. That same month, Verckys launched the Union des Musiciens Africains (Union of African Musicians) to encourage solidarity among African musicians and promote intra-continental collaboration.

In February 2006, he participated in a cultural industries forum held in Brazzaville, which was organized by UNESCO and supported by a Danish cultural development agency. The forum sought to build Pan-African cultural networks and encourage South-South cooperation for sustainable development through culture. He resigned from the presidency in October 2006, citing government favoritism toward the Association des Musiciens Congolais (AMC) and expressing frustration that President Kabila had repeatedly engaged AMC representatives while overlooking UMUCO, which he viewed as the legitimate national body representing Congolese musicians. He also criticized the government's neglect of UMUCO, which had received no public funding for nine consecutive years, unlike the state-subsidized AMC. His resignation plunged UMUCO into a period of uncertainty due to the lack of leadership. In May 2007, Congolese dancer and choreographer Lambert Moke (popularly known as Lambio Lambio), announced his candidacy for the presidency. By 2011, the Kinshasa-based French-language daily La Prospérité reported that Verckys was still regarded by some as president, although he was residing in Europe. During this period, Congolese musician Blaise Bula served as vice president.

In April 2015, Sterns Music released a significant portion of Verckys' Éditions Vévé record label output in MP3 format. This release was accompanied by a blog post that included his biography. On 16 July, he was elected president of SOCODA (Société Congolaise des Droits d'Auteurs et des Droits Voisins). However, on 13 November 2019, he resigned after several months of internal crisis. The organization faced significant issues, including financial mismanagement, a failure to distribute royalties for two years, and delayed reforms due to inadequate funding. Although two special commissions were appointed, one to revise the organization's statutes and another to conduct a financial audit, neither commission accomplished meaningful progress. Tensions within the board of directors intensified and prompted the Minister of Culture to intervene and establish a tripartite commission to stabilize the situation and prepare for an extraordinary general assembly. In light of the unresolved conflicts, Verckys opted to step down from his position. On 20 November 2020, he participated in the fourth edition of the Kinshasa Jazz Festival at the French Institute (Institut Français or Halle de la Gombe) in Gombe.

== Personal life and death ==
=== Family and relationships ===
Verckys was the father of seventeen children from several relationships. With his childhood beloved and legal wife, Lucie Caroline Bola, whom he married in 1971, he had four children: Solange (born 1965), Rolly (1967), Jean-Yves (1971), and Annie (1973). He also fathered four children with Christine Mireille Simone Ngoie Juster: Nicole (1975), Sylvie (1977), David (1978), and Ancy (1990), the latter of whom was regarded as having inherited her father's musical talent. Christine died in Kinshasa on 12 July 2021. With Stéphanie Feza, who died in 1998, he had two children: Christian (1981) and Deborah (1996). Three other children: Mamitsha (1967), Gisèle (1970), and Émilia (born in the 1990s), were born of common-law unions. In total, Verckys had thirteen recognized biological children: nine daughters and four sons.

In early April 2022, while still legally married to Lucie Caroline Bola, Verckys formalized a marriage to Séraphine Kondoli Kiamutu, also known as Séraphine Kiriza, with whom he had reportedly shared a relationship for 29 years. This decision was met with strong opposition from his children. On 21 April, his thirteen children jointly signed a procuration spéciale (special power of attorney) objecting to the planned marriage, scheduled for 23 April. In the document, they raised concerns about the legality and morality of the union, citing that their father remained married to Lucie Bola and had suffered a stroke that impaired his cognitive capacity to make informed decisions. They also asserted that he lacked the mental clarity to consent to a new marriage and, on that basis, unanimously opposed the ceremony. Despite their objections, the marriage proceeded on the scheduled date in Kinshasa, and was held on Avenue de l'OUA in Gombe.

In November 2022, Congolese news outlet Dépêche.cd reported that Verckys had four additional children with Séraphine, two sons and two daughters, which brings the total number of his children to seventeen.

=== Death ===
In November 2007, Le Potentiel reported that Verckys was in poor health and noted his reliance on a walking cane. After the death of fellow musician Madilu System in August 2007, Tabu Ley Rochereau publicly appealed for government assistance on Kiamuangana's behalf, citing his declining condition. In response, the Minister of Culture and Arts, Marcel Malenso Ndodila, allocated funds to facilitate his transfer to Belgium for medical treatment. After several attempts to secure a visa, he was eventually able to travel to Belgium for care.

By April 2022, reports confirmed that Verckys had previously suffered a stroke. He had not fully regained his mental faculties and lacked the capacity to understand or consent to legal or personal decisions. Footage from his April 2022 marriage ceremony, which widely circulated on social media, showed him in a visibly weakened state, struggling to walk, avoiding eye contact, and appearing incoherent and unresponsive throughout the nuptial rites. He died on 13 October in Kinshasa at the age of 78, and the funeral was held on 19 December. Before burial, his remains were displayed at the National Museum of the Democratic Republic of the Congo and the esplanade of the Palais du Peuple. He was laid to rest at the Entre Terre et Ciel cemetery in Kinshasa.

During the official funeral ceremony, President Félix Tshisekedi posthumously awarded him the Order of the National Heroes Kabila-Lumumba, and the ceremony was marked by military honors and a gathering of dignitaries, including government ministers, parliamentarians, cultural figures, artists, and members of the general public.

== Discography ==
Compilations

- Verckys & L'Orchestre Veve, Congolese Funk, Afrobeat and Psychedelic Rumba 1969 - 1978 (2014, Analog Africa)
- Verckys, Edition Veve 1969-1972 (2015, Sterns)
- Verckys, Edition Veve 1972-1978 (2015, Sterns)
- Verckys, Edition Veve 1969-1978 (2015, Sterns)
- Verckys, Edition Veve 1972-1975 (2015, Sterns)

Contributing artist

- The Rough Guide to Congo Gold (2008, World Music Network)
