= New Morning (disambiguation) =

New Morning is a 1970 album by Bob Dylan, or the title song.

New Morning may also refer to:

== Music ==
- New Morning (Alpha Rev album) or the title song, 2010
- New Morning (Johnny Coles album) or the title instrumental, 1982
- New Morning (Misia album), 2014
- A New Morning, an album by Suede, 2002
- New Morning, an album by Dianne Reeves, 1997
- New Morning, an album by Lisa Lynne, 2001
- New Morning, an album by Papa Wemba, 2006
- New Morning, an album by Sabrina Malheiros, 2008

== Other uses ==
- New Morning (club), Paris
