= First Twenty Years =

First Twenty Years or variants may refer to:

- The First Twenty Years (Spock's Beard album) (2015)
- Arkham House: The First 20 Years
- Centuries of Torment: The First 20 Years, a 2000 documentary by Cannibal Corpse
- Never Say Never: The First 20 Years
- Tuml = Lebn: The Best of the First 20 Years, a 2008 album by The Klezmatics
- The First Twenty Years, a 2010 album by Mississippi Mass Choir
- The First 20 Years, a 2004 album by Papa Wemba
- First 20 Years at the Top, a 1995 box set by The Shadows
- The First Twenty Years, a 2001 album by Glenn Shorrock
- Live: The First Twenty Years, a book about Saturday Night Live
- Hellboy: The First 20 Years, a 2014 Hellboy annual by Mike Mignola and Scott Allie

== See also ==
- The First Ten Years (disambiguation)
