= Bozi Boziana =

Congolese singer (born 1951)

- Born: 28 September 1951 (age 74); Democratic Republic of Congo
- Genres: Soukous, congolese rumba
- Occupation: Singer-songwriter
- Years active: 1971–present
- Labels: Boziro

Mbenzu Ngamboni Bokili (born 28 September 1951), better known as Bozi Boziana, is a Congolese singer, songwriter and bandleader. He has been in several major soukous bands, including Orchestre Bamboula, Minzoto Sangela, Zaiko Langa Langa, Isifi Lokole, Yoka Lokole, Langa Langa Stars and Choc Stars, and founded his own band, Orchestre Anti-Choc, which is considered among the most influential of the genre and also notable for introducing up to three female vocalists at any one time (as opposed to backing singers or dancers) into this band all of whom became celebrities in their own right, a tradition which continues up to today.

== Biography ==
Bozi Boziana began his career in the afro-pop band Air Marine, but he reached success in 1974 when he joined Zaiko Langa Langa, one of the most influential Congolese bands ever. In Zaiko Boziana had the chance to play with soukous stars Papa Wemba and Evoloko Jocker. Less than one year later, Papa Wemba and Evoloko left Zaiko Langa Langa and Bozi Boziana followed them in a new band called Isifi Lokole. Internal disagreements then caused Papa Wemba, Boziana, Mavuela Somo and others to leave Isifi Lokole and found a new band that was called Yoka Lokole. This group was quite successful in 1976, but by the end of the year Papa Wemba left again to found Viva la Musica. Yoka Lokole lost popularity and Boziana left in 1977. For a few months Boziana was in a duo with Efonge Gina, another member of Zaiko Langa Langa, recording a few hits such as Selemani (credited to Boziana) and Libanko Ya Ngai (Gina). In June 1977, Gina left Zaiko Langa Langa for Tout-Grand Libanko and Boziana took his place in his former band.

In 1981 producer Verckys Kiamuangana founded a soukous supergroup called Langa Langa Stars, with Evoloko Jocker, Dindo Yogo and others; Boziana was invited to join in and he did, leaving Zaiko Langa Langa for the second time. Langa Langa Stars lasted only a few years, and Boziana then moved to another major congolese band, Ben Nyamabo's Choc Stars, where he stayed until November 1985. With Choc Stars Boziana recorded some of his most famous songs ever, such as Sandu Kotti, Alena, Mbuta-Mutu, and Retrouvailles a Paris.

With Choc Stars Boziana became a true celebrity, and so he founded his own band, called Orchestre Anti-Choc (or simply "Anti-Choc"). The name "Anti-Choc" was intended to emphasize the Boziana's heritage from Zaiko Langa Langa (as this band was also informally known as "Tout-Choc Anti-Choc Zaiko Langa Langa"). Boziana's Anti-Choc became one of the major soukous bands in Congo, and many talented musicians played in the band over time; examples are Fifi Mofude, Djo Nolo, Koffi Alibaba, Wally Ngonda, Rigo Star, Ngouma Lokito, Deesse Mukangi, Scola "Nza Wissa" Miel and Betty "Bis" Kindobika, Marthe Lamugenia, Ngimbi Yespe and Maoussi Solange. The first guitarist of the band was Matou Kabangu, today a gospel singer; he was later replaced by Dodoly (previously in Lita Bembo's Orchestre Stukas), nicknamed "the sewing machine" because of the speed of his fingers moving on the guitar's fretboard. Dodoly's frenetic style became one of the trademarks of Anti-Choc, and was imitated by all the guitarists that replaced Dodoly in the following years.

From the 1980s on Boziana has continued Anti-Choc as well as recorded some solo works and other collaborations. In 1998, his album Bana Saint-Gabriel (guesting other former Zaiko Langa Langa members, including Evoloko Jocker) has won the Kora All-African Award for the best album in Central Africa.

== Partial discography ==
=== With Zaiko Langa Langa ===
- Diana ya mama
- Bilombe Bakutani
- La guerre des stars
- Zaiko Langa Langa

=== With Choc Stars ===
- Le belle epoque

=== With Anti-Choc ===
- La Reine de Sabah
- Doukoure
- Ba Bokilo
- Zongela Ngai
- Concert a la Mutualite de Paris
- Dansez Nza Wissa
- L'avenir
- 7eme anniversaire (1993)
- Coup monté (1994)
- Mbanzi ya Gamundele (1996)
- Les refoulés de Schengen (1997)
- Père Noël confiance (1997)
- Bana Saint-Gabriel (1998)
- Ba mere ya circuit (Sonodisc, 1999)
- Jeu Muke

=== Solo albums ===
- Ma raison d'etre (1994)
- Mama na bana (Sonodisc, 1994)
- Les yeux dans les yeux (Sonodisc 1995)
- L'as des As (1997)
- Position Eyebani (1999)
- Héeros ya Congo (Sonima, 2002)
- Ekeko (Sonima, 2005)
- Film Ebaluki
