= Dindo Yogo =

- Born: Théodore Dindo Mabeli; 30 December 1955; Lokutu, Tshopo, Belgian Congo (modern-day Democratic Republic of the Congo)
- Died: 23 August 2000 (aged 44) Kinshasa
- Genres: Congolese rumba; soukous
- Occupations: Singer; musician
- Years active: 1978–2000
- Formerly of: Viva La Musica, Zaiko Langa Langa, and Langa Langa Stars

Théodore Dindo Mabeli (30 December 1955 – 23 August 2000), known professionally as Dindo Yogo, was a Congolese singer and musician. He was also called La Voix Cassée (the Broken Voice).

In 1978, Dindo Yogo joined Papa Wemba's Viva La Musica.

In September 1981, with three other colleagues—guitarist Popolipo Zanguila, and fellow vocalists Djuna Djanana and "Espérant" Kisangani Djenga—Dindo Yogo left Papa Wemba's band (which was itself a sort of spin-off from Zaiko Langa Langa, or a member of the loose family of bands known as Clan Langa Langa). The four from Viva La Musica joined three musicians who had quit Zaiko Langa Langa—Evoloko Jocker, Djo Mali and Bozi Boziana—in forming the Langa Langa Stars. They formed that group under the patronage of music impresario Verckys Kiamuangana.

The Langa Langa Stars were described in 1988 as "one of the most productive of all the Zaiko offshoots." They were popular and the quality of Dindo Yogo's "quavering voice" has been noted, for example on their song "Fleur Bakutu," but the band's structure with many established stars, known as the sept patrons (seven bosses), proved to be a failure, and the effects of its failure were worsened by the fact that Verckys contractually retained ownership of the band's instruments for its first four years.

In 1984, Dindo Yogo made another move, this time to Zaiko Langa Langa, following Popolipo who had made the same switch in March 1983. During his time with Zaiko, he also recorded a number of solo albums. In 1988, when Zaiko split into Zaiko Langa Langa Familia Dei, under Bimi Ombale, and Zaiko Langa Langa Nkolo Mboka, under N'Yoka Longo, Dindo Yogo opted to side with the latter group.

In 1991, he left that band and went solo definitively until his death in 2000.

He died in August 2000, after suffering a collapse in Kinshasa from long illness. He was married twice and had several children.

Graeme Ewens, writing his obituary in The Guardian, evaluated Yogo as "one [of] those singers who moved people of all ages, social classes and ethnic allegiances with his plaintive, quivering voice, known as the voix cassé."

== Discography ==
=== Works ===
- 1985 Prix Nobel De La Paix 85 [or La Rock Star de Zaire]
- 1987 Luzolo
- 1987 Apres Leurs Tournées de Tokyo – Paris – Kinshasa
- 1988 Dindo Yogo & Klay Mawungu (with Klay Mawungu)
- 1988 Kamata 500! (with Lengi-Lenga aka Ya Lengos)
- 1989 Ngai Naye
- 1989 C'est la vie ...
- 1990 La Vie est heureuse... [or La Vie Est Heureuse Quand On Se Sent Aimer]
- 1990 Chante Piscos [or Dindo Yogo Chante Esake Piscos]
- 1993 Mukaji wani [or Groupe Ng Waka Aye "Mukaji Wani"]
- 1994 Willo Mondo & La Congolaise [a re-release on one CD of two 1985 records by different artists; it contains all four tracks from Dindo Yogo's Prix Nobel de la Paix 85, and the four tracks from King Kester Emeneya's (of Victoria Eleison) Willo Mondo]
- 1997 Laquelle Toi Choisir [or Laquelle toi choisir...? Oh la vie...!]
- 1997 Succès des années 70
- 1998 Soo Wa
- 2000 + d'Amour
- (unknown year) Dindo Yogo [a re-release on CD of Ngwaka Ayé, Ayé Lisusu! plus two tracks from C'Est La Vie]
- (unknown year) Duo du Tonnerre
- (unknown year) Pour un nouveau depart
