= Dodoly =

Dodoli Kidima
- Born: Democratic Republic of the Congo
- Genres: Soukous
- Occupation: Musician
- Instrument: Guitar

Dodoli Kidima or simply Dodoli (sometimes spelled Dodoly) is a Congo DR soukous guitarist. He is best known for his high speed solos, for which he has been nicknamed la machine a coudre ("the sewing machine").

== Career ==
He began his career in Orchestre Stukas, a soukous band that reached the apex of its popularity in Zaire in the mid-1970s. In the 1980s he played the lead guitar briefly in Bipoli Tshando's short-lived band Victoria Principal but reached the apex of his popularity in Bozi Boziana's Anti-Choc, one of the bands the dominated the soukous scene in that decade. Dodoly was so fundamental to Anti-Choc's sound that, when he left, the musicians that replaced him (including major guitarists such as Rigo Star) all sought to imitate his style. Dodoli left Anti-Choc briefly in 1987, to join Djo Nolo's short-lived project Choc Musica, but rejoined Boziana's band in 1988. That year, he was nominated "best guitarist" by the Kinshasa press. In Anti-Choc, he also contributed as a composer, writing hit songs such as Lelo Makambo – Lobi Makambo ("problems today, problems tomorrow"). He left Anti-Choc again in the early 1990s.

== Partial discography ==
=== With Bozi Boziana and Anti-Choc ===
- Le Grand Père Bozi-Boziana & L'Anti-Choc – Ba Bokilo
- Bozi Boziana, Joly Detta and Deesse & L'Anti-Choc – Zongela Ngai
- Bozi Boziana & L'Anti-Choc – Coupe Monte
- Bozi Boziana – Ma Raison d'Être
- Anti-Choc – Adieu l'Ami (1988)

=== With others ===
- Safro Manzangi Elima – Wiseman

== Sources ==
- Marty Sinnock, Bozi Boziana: Zaiko to Anti-Choc with a String of Beautiful Women, Africa Sounds
- Marty Sinnock (2), London, Paris, Kin, Brazza – Everybody Talk'about! King Kester Emeneya & Victoria Eleison, Africa Sounds
- Gary Stewart, Rumba on the River: A History of the Popular Music of the Two Congos, Verso, London 2000
