= The First Ten Years =

The First Ten Years may refer to:

- The Singles: The First Ten Years, a 1982 album by ABBA
- The First Ten Years (Joan Baez album)
- The Best of Elvis Costello: The First 10 Years
- The First Ten Years (Iron Maiden album)
  - The First Ten Years: The Videos, a video album by Iron Maiden
- The First Ten Years (Gabin album)
- The First Ten Years (Vicious Rumors video album)
- Greatest Hits: The First Ten Years, an album by Vanessa Williams
- For the Record: The First 10 Years
- The First Ten Years, a 1990 album by Windham Hill
- The First Ten Years, a 1999 album by Shawn Mullins
- The First Ten Years, a 1994 album by Schooner Fare
- The First Ten Years, an album by Le Trio Joubran

== See also ==
- First Twenty Years (disambiguation)
