= Lokole =

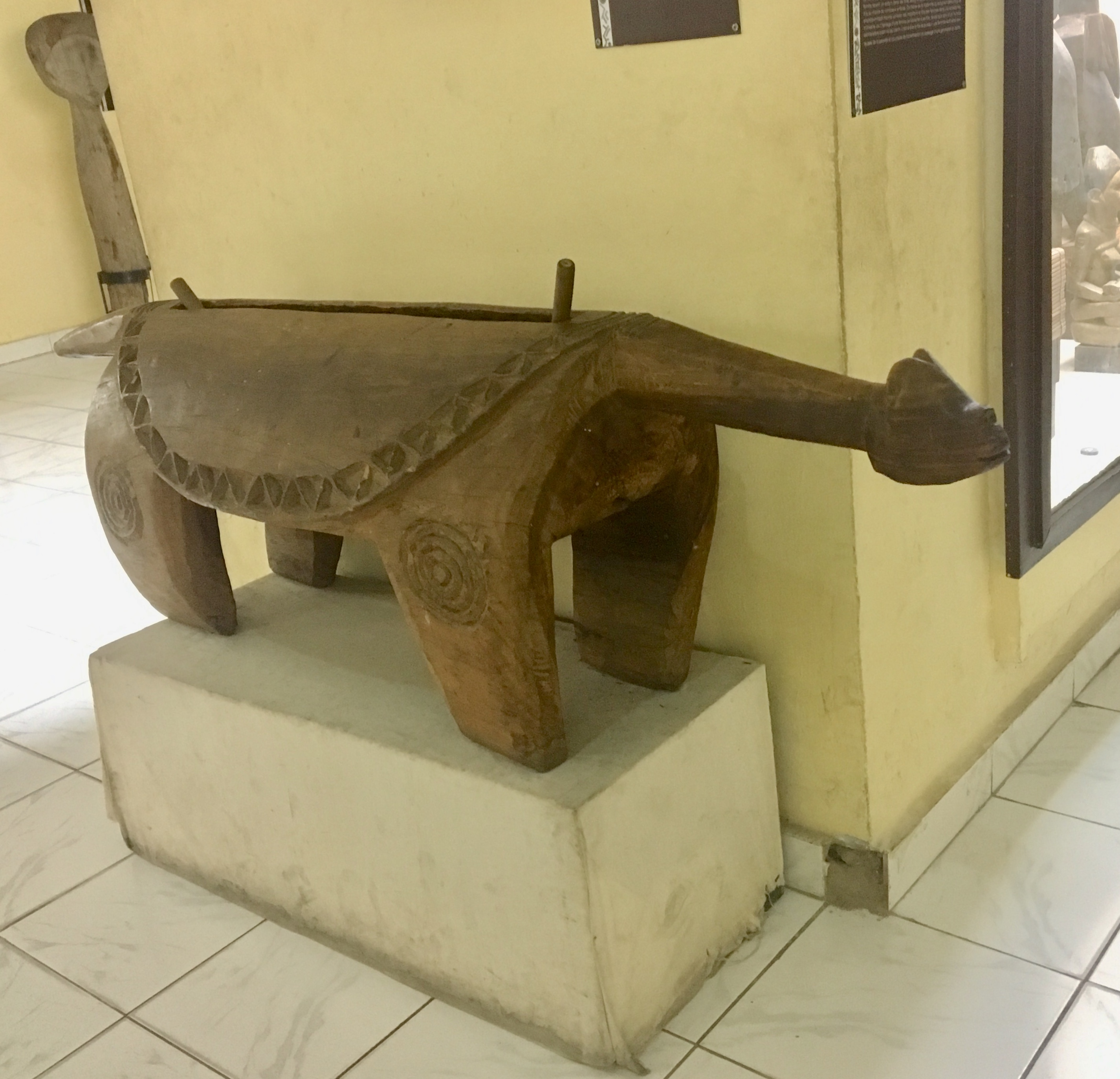
A lokole at Institute of National Museums of Congo, Kinshasa.

The lokole is a traditional slit drum played in different areas of the Congo region, e.g., in the Kasai area. It is used both as a musical instrument and as a log drum to send messages in the bush; for example, it is known to be played to announce someone's death to the neighboring villages. It is a deep-sounding slit drum, traditionally made out of a hollow tree trunk. It is beaten with sticks, and can produce a small range of bass notes.

== Lokole in pop music ==
While the lokole has been occasionally employed in modern Congolese music at least since the 1940s, it became prominent in Zairean pop music during the Authenticité campaign (1960s-1970s) that sought to preserve and rediscover the Congolese tradition as opposed to imported, Western habits. It was most notably Zairean singer Papa Wemba who endorsed lokole as an integral part of the sound of his bands, two of which (Isifi Lokole and Yoka Lokole) were actually named after this drum. In the late 1970s, Wemba's band Viva La Musica brought the lokole to the attention of an international audience.
