= Papa Wemba =

Congolese musician (1949–2016)

Papa Wemba ONH
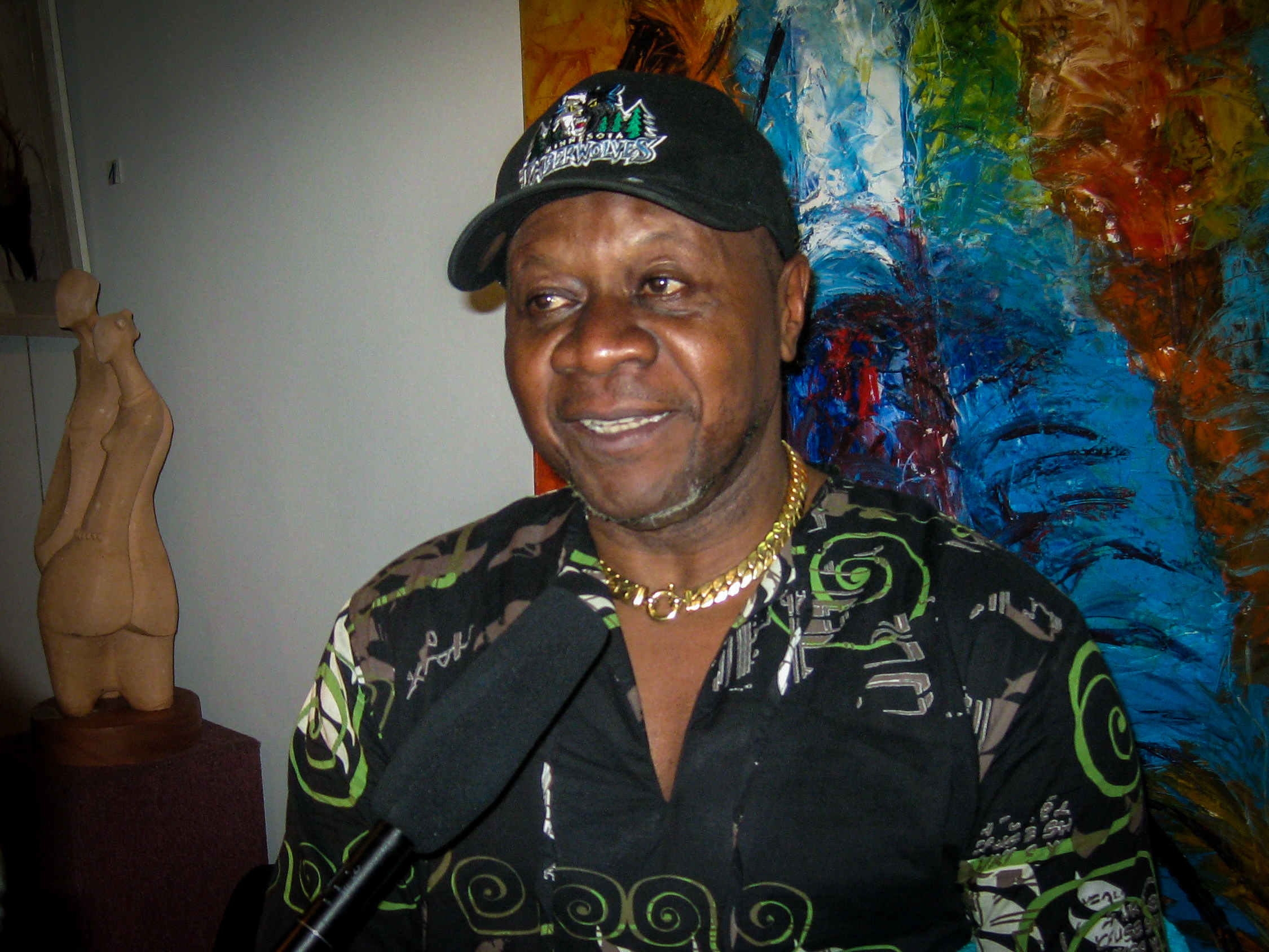
- Papa Wemba in 2009

Background information
- Born: Jules Shungu Wembadio Pene Kikumba; 14 June 1949; Lubefu, Belgian Congo (now Sankuru, DR Congo)
- Died: 24 April 2016 (aged 66) Abidjan, Ivory Coast
- Genres: Congolese rumba; world music
- Occupations: Singer; dancer; songwriter; actor; bandleader
- Years active: 1969–2016
- Labels: SonoDisc; Real World Records; Sonima; No Name
- Website: www.papawemba.info

Jules Shungu Wembadio Pene Kikumba (14 June 1949 – 24 April 2016), known professionally as Papa Wemba, was a Congolese singer, songwriter, bandleader, and actor who is credited with popularizing Congolese rumba and African popular music internationally. Through his music and fashion, he influenced contemporary Congolese fashion, and was a central figure in the rise of La Sape in Paris. Dubbed the "King of Rumba", Wemba is often regarded as one of Africa's greatest vocalists and performers.

Raised in a household where his mother worked as a professional mourning singer, he made his public debut in Kinshasa in the late 1960s and first rose to prominence as a founding member of Zaïko Langa Langa. With its stripped-down instrumentation and urban aesthetic, Zaïko forged a new musical style of Congolese rumba. Wemba's crystalline tenor, dancing, and fashion sense soon established him as one of Zaïko's principal vocalists. After internal disputes, he co-founded two short-lived but influential groups: Isifi Lokole, which incorporated lokole percussion, and Yoka Lokole. His emergence as a bandleader began in 1977, when he founded Viva La Musica, which quickly became a fixture of the Kinshasa and Paris music scenes and served as a launching pad for many of Congolese music's future leading performers.

In 1987, Wemba began pursuing an international career. Based between Kinshasa and Paris, he emerged as a prominent world music artist and later signed with Peter Gabriel's Real World Records. His internationally released albums, most notably Papa Wemba (1988), Le Voyageur (1992), Emotion (1995), and Molokaï (1998), helped introduce Congolese rumba to Western audiences through a synthesis of rumba, pop, and world music. Wemba's tenor voice and stage presence helped make him one of the first African artists to achieve broad crossover success in Europe, North America, and Japan.

In 2003, he was detained in France for alleged involvement in human-smuggling network that used musicians' passports; he spent several months in detention before being released. The arrest received extensive media coverage but did not permanently tarnish his reputation. He later continued performing and recording. On 24 April 2016, while performing at the Festival des musiques urbaines d'Anoumabo (FEMUA) in Abidjan, Côte d'Ivoire, Wemba collapsed mid-performance and died from heart complications at the age of 66.

== Life and career ==
=== 1949–1966: Early life and musical debuts ===
Jules Shungu Wembadio Pene Kikumba was born on June 14, 1949, in Lubefu, Sankuru district, in the Kasai region of what was then the Belgian Congo (now the Democratic Republic of the Congo). He belonged to the Tetela tribe, descending from Ba Tetela warrior chieftains, and later achieved full chieftain status from clan elders for his contributions to music and culture. As the firstborn son, he was traditionally called "Papa," a title that stuck and symbolized his family responsibilities. His father, Jules Kekumba, a former soldier who had fought for the Belgian Army during World War II, moved the family to Kinshasa (then Léopoldville) when Wemba was about six years old.

Growing up in the capital, Wemba witnessed the tumultuous events surrounding Congo's independence in 1960, including riots that followed the celebrations. His mother, Marie Nyondo, a professional mourner who sang at funerals and wakes, was his earliest musical influence and "first teacher," inspiring his rich vocal style, he often credited her for his wealth in words and melodies. As a child, he began humming tunes at home around age 11 to 13, forming street groups with homemade instruments and emerging as the lead vocalist by his early teens. He quit playing football at 15 to focus on singing. After his father's death in 1966, Wemba joined the choir at St. Joseph's Roman Catholic Church, drawing from religious music that later infused his work with minor keys, though he soon transitioned to secular pop. Influenced by American R&B, he earned the nickname "Presley" in his youth, paying homage to Elvis Presley.

=== 1970–1976: Zaïko Langa Langa, Isifi Lokole and Yoka Lokole ===
After a brief stint in Orchestre Stukas, Wemba's professional career launched in December 1969 when, at age 20, he co-founded the influential band Zaïko Langa Langa in Kinshasa, impressing with his composition "Désespoir Jules" and helping dissolve the prior group Bel Guide National. The band became a cornerstone of the Congolese rumba-rock movement. Zaïko thrived during President Mobutu Sese Seko's 1971 "Campaign of Authenticity," which promoted Zairian identity by discouraging European influences and Christian names, Wemba dropped "Jules" and "Presley" in alignment in favor of "Shungu Wembadio". During his tenure with the band, Wemba composed hits including "Pauline", "C'est la vérité", "Liwa Ya Somo", "Miyelele" and "Chouchouna". The group experimented with multiple singers, drums, electric instruments, forgoing traditional wind sections, and performed at the iconic Zaire 74 music festival alongside legends like Franco and Tabu Ley, opening for international acts like James Brown.

Wemba was part of the short-lived faction known as "AJUMAGI," an informal coalition within Zaïko Langa Langa that emerged in 1973. It brought together several of the band's leading figures, including Antho Nickel (Evoloko), Mavuela, and Gina, whose initials formed the acronym. Considered a temporary hegemony or dominant clique within Zaïko, the faction briefly influenced the group's artistic direction before ultimately dissolving in December 1974, when Wemba, Evoloko Jocker, Bozi Boziana and Mavuela Somo left to form Isifi Lokole, standing for Institut du Savoir Idéologie pour la Formation des Idoles. Within Isifi Lokole, Wemba recorded several early works that would later be regarded as formative in his career, including "Ainsi va la vie" and the popular love ballad "Amazone." Although the group attracted significant attention and commercial success, it was quickly affected by internal rivalries and organizational instability, resulting in its dissolution after approximately one year. A notable feature of this period was Wemba's reintroduction of the lokole, an ancestral slit drum, into a modern, harmonically sophisticated setting.

During this period of musical realignment, Wemba underwent an important transformation of artistic identity. In July 1975, he adopted the stage name "Papa Wemba," with "Papa" chosen to convey authority, seniority, and respect, and "Wemba" formed as a contraction of his birth name, Shungu Wembadio. The adoption of this name marked what Wemba later described as a personal and artistic rebirth. In November 1975, he joined Mavuela Somo and Bozi Boziana to form a new ensemble, Yoka Lokole. Despite producing several recordings and maintaining a strong public profile, the group experienced persistent internal tensions. These culminated in Wemba's public dismissal in 1976 by fellow member Mbuta Mashakado, an incident widely reported in Kinshasa at the time and later described by Wemba as a significant personal setback that nonetheless shaped his future direction.

=== 1977–1989: Creating Viva La Musica, SAPE and move to Paris ===
Following this departure, Wemba shifted decisively toward greater artistic autonomy. In February 1977, he founded Viva La Musica, an orchestra that drew its name from the phrase "Que viva la música!" popularized by the American salsa bandleader Johnny Pacheco. Viva La Musica was conceived not only as a musical ensemble but also as a broader cultural project linked to "Village Molokai," a semi-communal artistic space established by Wemba in the Matonge district. Village Molokai served as a training ground for emerging musicians and contributed to the consolidation of Wemba's public role as a mentor, echoed in the growing use of the name "Papa." The early years of Viva La Musica were marked by rapid success. Within its first year, the Kinshasa newspaper Elima named Viva La Musica Best Orchestra in Zaïre, awarded Papa Wemba the title of Best Singer, and designated the song "Mère Supérieure" as Best Song.

Wemba, accompanied by Viva guitarist Rigo Star, briefly joined Tabu Ley Rochereau's Afrisa International for mentorship in 1979, releasing "Ngambo Moko" and "Levres Roses," and toured Senegal, Germany, and France. His exposure to Europe shifted his perspective. Wemba became one of the most prominent public figures associated with the Société des Ambianceurs et des Personnes Élégantes (SAPE). A trip to Paris in 1979 marked a turning point in his engagement with the movement. Through his friend Stervos Niarcos, an influential figure closely connected to the Brazzaville sapeur scene, Wemba and his protégé Emeneya were introduced in 1980 to the underlying philosophy and aesthetic codes of the SAPE. Wemba quickly recognized the international potential of this cultural practice and began to formalize and promote it, integrating sartorial display into his musical persona in a way that made image and sound inseparable.

Believing there was a potentially wider audience for the music he had been helping to create during the preceding decade, Wemba frequently traveled to Europe. However, Wemba's frequent absences often led to tensions within Viva, and the first signs of instability emerged in September when four prominent members, Espérant Kisangani, Dindo Yogo, Djuna Djanana, and Huit Kilos, left the group to join forces with Evoloko Jocker, Bozi Boziana, and Djo Mali of Zaïko Langa Langa in founding Langa Langa Stars. In Spring 1982, he went to Paris to record new solo material. On May 9, 1982, he returned triumphantly to Kinshasa via Brazzaville, bringing with him a huge crowd surprised to see him alive. Concerned about maintaining order and protocol, security forces prevented his arrival at the event and escorted him away. The comeback was supported by the release of the Paris-recorded LP Bakosi Liwa Ya Papa Wemba Eee ! alongside the single "Événement", both commemorating his return. He also recorded the LP Bilombe Bakutani alongside former bandmates Jossart N'Yoka Longo and Bimi Ombale. In October of the same year, Viva lost ten of its prominents members, including Kester Emeneya and Bipoli Tshando, who went to form the band Victoria Eleison.

Following this setback, Papa Wemba set about rebuilding Viva La Musica in early 1983. The new group launched "Rumba Rock Frenchen", a new dance which marked the new era of the band and was supported by the release of several successful singles. Driven by a growing European fascination with African music, Viva's LPs began selling consistently well in Europe for the first time. Capitalizing on this momentum during another European trip, Wemba recorded "Malimba", his first sono-mondiale single produced in Brussels that same year, collaborating with Belgian avant-garde composer Hector Zazou. In late 1983, while returning from a performance in Bukavu, Wemba was seriously injured in a road accident. The radiator of the vehicle he was driving burst, covering him with scalding water. He spent several weeks recovering in a local hospital and later commemorated the experience in the hit folkloric song "Bukavu Dawa," in which he expressed his gratitude to the medical staff who cared for him.

In 1985, the influential Zairian record producer Verckys released Papa Wemba's album Beau Gosse Ya Paris. Despite having refused to collaborate with Verckys' label for several years, Wemba recorded the project, which featured the compelling title track alongside "Sahel Africa," a poignant anthem calling for peace in the Sahel region. The album also showcased the diverse talents within his circle, including "Suliya," composed by singer Luciana Demingongo, and "Kalisia," written by guitarist Milo Son.

Seeking to expand his sonic and geographical horizons, Wemba traveled to Brussels in December 1985. There, he recorded the albums L'Esclave and Destin Ya Moto. Shortly after, in May 1986, he embarked on a Japanese tour backed by Viva La Musica, marking the very first time a Zairian band had performed in the country. This trip gave a dedicated and rapidly growing Japanese fanbase their first live experience of Wemba's band during concerts in Tokyo and Osaka. A return visit was proposed for later that year but was postponed to 1987, featuring a modified band lineup. During this period, Wemba also recorded and released a solo international LP titled Siku Ya Mungu (God's Day), arranged by Maurice Poto. Wemba returned to Kinshasa in August 1986, coinciding with the release of L'Esclave. The title track tackled the heavy themes of slavery and racism, lamenting the centuries of oppression faced by Black people globally. The album also included "M'Fono Yami" (My Sufferings), sung in his native Tetela language, and "Bakwetu" (My Brothers), a celebratory song performed in the Songye language.

The multi-awarded film La vie est belle (1987), a collaboration between the Belgian director Benoît Lamy and Mweze Ngangura, a Congolese director, screenwriter and documentary filmmaker. Papa Wemba played "Kourou", the hero of this romantic comedy. The film revolves around the music scene of Kinshasa and tells the rags-to-riches story of a poor rural musician, who seeks fame in the big city. The film was shot in Kinshasa, after Viva la Musica's Japanese tour.

==== Move to Paris ====
In 1987, Wemba signed a solo worldwide management deal with Japanese promoters. This required both him and Viva La Musica to relocate from Kinshasa to Paris to facilitate the international promotion of his music. The move caused public speculation regarding the future of Viva La Musica and whether Wemba was shifting his focus away from his African audience. Wemba left Kinshasa with an inner core of Viva musicians and began recording with French producer Martin Meissonnier. The remaining band members in Kinshasa were later sent tickets to join the rest of the group in Europe. The material recorded with Meissonnier was released in 1988 as a self-titled world music LP, Papa Wemba, through Sterns. The album was primarily composed of newly recorded versions of his major hits, including "M'Fono Yami," "Bakwetu," "Analengo," "Mukaji Wanyi," "Bokulaka," "L'Esclave," and the previously unreleased "Hambayi Ede." For live promotions of his international material, Wemba formed a new backing band called Molokai. The only musicians retained from the Kinshasa faction of Viva La Musica were Reddy Amisi, Stino Mubi, Ikonola Isibangi, and Luciana Demingongo. In 1989, Wemba made his debut performances in London and New York backed by this new lineup. Operating as Molokai International, the band subsequently undertook worldwide tours as part of the WOMAD (World of Music, Arts and Dance) festival packages.

Parallel to his international career, Papa Wemba continued to record and perform traditional Congolese rumba. During this period, he released several rumba albums, including Love Kilawu (1987), Le Jour J de l'Histoire Romaine (1988, alongside Modogo Gian Franco Ferre), and Mokili Ngele (1989). When not touring globally, he maintained a regular fanbase within Zaire as well as among the Congolese diaspora communities in Paris and Brussels. From 1987 onward, Viva La Musica maintained a studio output of six to eight LPs and videos per year, alongside collaborative projects with former Zaïko Langa Langa colleagues recorded in Brussels and Paris, all of which featured Wemba. Concurrently, prominent members of Viva La Musica released solo albums that featured guest appearances by Wemba, and he undertook regional African tours with the group.

=== 1990–2000: Double career ===
In the early 1990s, Wemba returned to Kinshasa to assemble a local faction of Viva La Musica composed of veteran musicians and new personnel to accompany him on tours within Zaire. Wemba signed a solo recording contract with Peter Gabriel's Real World Records in 1991. His album Le Voyageur was initially released by EarthBeat in 1991 before receiving wider distribution through Virgin Records in 1992. The album blended Congolese rumba with world influences, establishing a commercial presence in the world music market. In 1993, Wemba was selected as the opening act for Peter Gabriel's Secret World Tour, performing before stadium audiences across North America and Europe.

In April 1994, Wemba released the album Foridoles (abbreviation of Formateur des idoles) through SonoDisc, backed by Viva La Musica. The track listing included "Dixième commandement," "Bravo Cathy," and "Reference" (which featured guest vocals by Sam Mangwana), and the release became a structural reference point for contemporary Congolese rumba. It was followed by Pole Position (1995) and Wake Up (October 1996), a collaboration with his former lyricist Koffi Olomide. By the autumn of 1994, Wemba began recording his next album, Emotion, at Real World Studios in Wiltshire, England. Released in 1995 on the Real World label, Emotion was produced by Stephen Hague, known for his work with British electronic pop groups like New Order, Erasure, and Pet Shop Boys. The production strategy deliberately integrated African vocal arrangements with European electronic pop instrumentation rather than utilizing a conventional ethnographic recording style. The tracklist featured "Yolele," "Show Me The Way," and a cover version of Otis Redding's "Fa Fa Fa Fa Fa (Sad Song)." Wemba performed the vocals primarily in the Lingala language. Emotion sold over 100,000 copies globally and reached No. 14 on the Billboard World Albums chart. Wemba subsequently undertook a North American concert tour to promote the release.

In 1996, Papa Wemba received the Best Male Artist prize at the KORA All-Africa Music Awards. Wemba decided to return to Kinshasa. Being a pragmatist, he kept Viva La Musica, based in Paris, for his fans in the diaspora, as well as Molokai for his international solo career. Back in the Congo, he founded a new band, Nouvelle Écriture, made up of new members. Viva La Musica, which remained in Paris, adopted the suffix "Cour des Grands" in Wemba's absence. In 1997, Wemba also adopted the prefix Mzee, which means "wise man" or "man of wisdom" in Swahili, becoming Mzee Papa Wemba, a title symbolizing recognition of his contributions to African and Congolese music. A self-titled album, Nouvelle Écriture, was released in August of that same year: it included ten tracks, five of which were recorded in Brazzaville by the new band (including "Effo Perso," "Jeancy," and "Mamu Kapinga"), and five recorded by Wemba in Paris (including "Sai-Sai," "Est-ce que," and "Mama"). He went on an African tour with the band, before launching a European venture which led to the recording of their second album, L'. Meanwhile, on 2 June 1998, Wemba released Molokai through Real World Records. Recorded live in a Parisian studio, it became his farewell album for the label as his contract was concluded due to conflicting releases appearing on other record labels.

In March 1999, Papa Wemba returned to Europe with Nouvelle Écriture and performed at the Zénith in Paris for the first time. The concert brought together the full lineups of Molokai, Viva La Musica Cour des Grands, and Nouvelle Écriture. In June 1999, M'Zee Fula Ngenge was released through SonoDisc. During the summer of the same year, he gave further concerts in Paris and Brussels, notably at Forest National, becoming the first Congolese artist to perform there, with Viva La Musica Cour des Grands, to celebrate his 50th birthday and 30 years in the music industry. Back in Congo, Wemba organized the Festival Fula Ngenge, a six-day festival at the Stade des Martyrs in Kinshasa, to celebrate this anniversary. Several former members of Zaïko Langa Langa and Molokai also joined him on stage for the occasion. On the last day, he was appointed chief of the Anamongo chiefdom. After a performance on the Zénith de Paris earlier in June, Nouvelle Écriture's third album and first double album, À La Une, was released on 22 December 2000.

=== 2001–2009: Bakala Dia Kuba, Bercy concert, legal issues and return to Kinshasa ===
On December 31, 2001, Papa Wemba performed at the Palais Omnisports de Paris-Bercy, joined on stage by the rumba pioneer Wendo Kolosoy. This concert was part of a European tour encompassing France, Belgium, England, and Switzerland, before a stop in West Africa. The band returned home at the end of February 2002. On February 18, 2003, French immigration police (OCRIEST), acting in coordination with Belgian authorities, arrested Papa Wemba and his wife, Marie Rose Luzolo (Mère Amazone), in Paris. He was charged with organized human trafficking, forgery, and criminal association. The investigation revealed that Papa Wemba had used his musical tours to smuggle hundreds of Congolese nationals into Europe. Under a practice known in Lingala as ngulu (literally meaning "pig", a term used to describe passengers who paid to hitch a ride on an official entourage without knowing their final destination), individuals paid sums ranging from $2,150 to $4,000 to be falsely listed as dancers, musicians, or road crew members on Viva La Musica’s travel visas. Once they arrived at European airports, the ngulu would slip away into the Congolese diaspora communities of Paris, Brussels, and London. The scheme fell apart when European border officials became suspicious of large groups of "musicians" arriving without instruments, costumes, or personal luggage. Wemba spent three and a half months in the Fleury-Mérogis prison in Paris before being released on a €30,000 bail. During his trial in late 2004, he admitted to playing a role in the network but insisted his motives were primarily humanitarian. This defense was echoed by many in the Congolese diaspora. He played a comeback concert at the Zénith de Paris on 25 October 2003.

Incarceration profoundly affected Wemba, who stated that he experienced a spiritual conversion in prison. He recounted this experience on the album Somo Trop, released in October 2003, particularly in the track "Numéro d'écrou" (Prison Number), where he evokes the arrival of God in his cell. After his legal battles, Papa Wemba returned to the Democratic Republic of Congo in 2004, affirming his intention to settle permanently in his native country after nearly twenty years spent in Europe. In February 2006, Wemba performed at a sold out New Morning, Paris. The intimate acoustic concert marked a successful renaissance after his legal issues. After his imprisonment, he released two albums: Nkunzi Nlele, in 2006, backed by his new Paris-based band Viva Tendances, and then, in 2008, Kaka Yo, recorded with his new group Bana Malongi, made up of about fifteen young artists to whom he was offering a first chance.

=== 2010–2016: The rumba guardian ===
On January 13, 2010, Papa Wemba and his wife were received in audience at the Vatican by Pope Benedict XVI. Wemba began recording the double album Notre Père (Our Father). This was the common title for the two albums released in July and October 2010. One was subtitled Rumba and the other World. Notre Père Rumba was recorded with Viva La Musica. Among the tracks are collaborations with Nathalie Makoma ("Six millions ya ba soucis"), Nash ("Sapologie"), and Ophélie Winter ("Ye te oh"). At WOMEX 2010, he was interviewed by Afropop Worldwide, stating about his album that his songs are about love, adding: "I am Catholic, and God has commanded us all to love." During the same year, Papa Wemba was also invited to perform at Yaoundé en Fête (YA-FE 2010) in Cameroon, alongside artists including Meiway. In 2011, he participated in the Mawazine festival in Rabat, Morocco.

In June 2014, he released his final major double-album, Maître d’École (Rumba Na Rumba). The album featured collaborations with JB Mpiana, Nana Kouyaté and Barbara Kanam, alongside his old Zaïko Langa Langa colleague Jossart N'Yoka Longo on the track "Nostalgie". This return to roots is deliberate: interviewed on the set of France 24 for the release of the album, Papa Wemba explains that he felt the need to return to the origins of Congolese rumba, asserting his status as the "Schoolmaster" of the genre. In December 2015, he was knighted into the Order of National Heroes Kabila-Lumumba.

== Death ==
On 24 April 2016, Papa Wemba died at the age of 66 after collapsing on stage in Abidjan, Ivory Coast, during the FEMUA urban music festival. The show was being broadcast live on RTI 1, one of Ivory Coast's public television channels. Footage showed his fellow performers rushing to his side as he collapsed in front of thousands of fans. He was taken to a nearby clinic but could not be resuscitated. The cause of death was cardiac arrest. His sudden death sparked a massive wave of mourning across Africa and the global music community. His body was flown back to Kinshasa, where he received a state funeral. He was posthumously promoted from Knight to Grand Officer of the Order of the National Heroes Kabila-Lumumba at the Palais du Peuple in Kinshasa.

== Cultural impact and legacy ==
Alongside the legendary collective Zaïko Langa Langa, Papa Wemba fundamentally revolutionized Congolese rumba, rewriting its rules and carrying its spirit to the global stage. This "third generation" of rumba brought an entirely new energy to the youth of Kinshasa. They popularized the cavacha (a rapid, driving snare drum rhythm inspired by the mechanical cadence of a train) and put heavy emphasis on the sebene (the fast-paced, improvisational instrumental bridge meant strictly to get people dancing). Wemba's most potent weapon was his voice, a piercing, high-pitched, and deeply emotive tenor often described as a "rooster-like" croon. He inherited this vocal intensity from his mother, who was a pleureuse.

Papa Wemba earned the moniker "The King of Rumba" as he took his sound global. He popularized La Sape (an acronym for the Société des Ambianceurs et des Personnes Élégantes), which originated in Brazzaville, a subculture that turned high fashion into a profound statement of pride, refinement, and defiance against colonial stereotypes. By stepping onto global stages draped in elite designer fashion from Paris and Milan, he taught a generation of Africans that elegance was a form of self-sovereignty.

Wemba said:

The Sapeur cult promoted high standards of personal cleanliness, hygiene and smart dress, to a whole generation of youth across Zaire. When I say well groomed, well shaved, well perfumed, it's a characteristic that I am insisting on among the young. I don't care about their education, since education always comes first of all from the family.

== Personal life ==
Wemba met his wife, Marie-Rose Luzolo, known as Amazone, in 1970, although the couple did not marry until 2014. They had six children together, including Khady and Orphée, who later pursued a career in music. In numerous interviews, Wemba also revealed that he had fathered a total of 33 children.

== Selected discography ==
=== Studio albums ===
- Papa Wemba, EMI France (1988)
- Le Voyageur, Real World Records / Virgin Records (1992)
- Foridoles (1994)
- Emotion, Real World Records / Virgin Records (1995) FR No. 129 US No. 14(World)
- Molokaï, Real World Records / Virgin Records (1998)
- Nouvelle Ecriture dans L (1998)
- M'Zée Fula-Ngenge (1999)
- Légende (2001)
- Notre Père Rumba (2009)

=== Live albums ===
- Papa Wemba Au Japon (1986)
- Papa Wemba Live New Morning, Real World Records (2006)

=== Other albums ===
- Wake Up (with Koffi Olomide) (1996)
- Big Blue Ball, Real World Records / Rykodisc (2008) BE No. 37 FR No. 13 US No. 130

== Filmography ==
- Les Habits neufs du gouverneur (The Governor's New Clothes) (2005)
- Combat de fauves (Wild Games) (1997) – role: "The African"
- La Vie est Belle (Life Is Beautiful) [alternate title: Life Is Rosy] (1987) – role: Kourou
- Kinshasa Kids (Kinshasa Kids) (2012) – as himself
