= Yoka Lokole =

Yoka Lokole was a soukous band from Zaire (now Democratic Republic of the Congo) founded by Papa Wemba and others in 1975 and disbanded in 1978. Despite its short life, Yoka Lokole was a prominent band in Zaire in the mid-1970s, as its lineup comprised several of the most influential soukous musicians of the times, including Papa Wemba, Bozi Boziana, and Mavuela Somo. Yoka Lokole's most important members were singers; the vocal ensemble of the group was collectively known as the Fania All-Stars of Zaire. Since most of the soukous "stars" in Yoka Lokole were former members of Zaiko Langa Langa, Yoka Lokole belongs to the so-called "Clan Langa Langa", i.e., the large family of Zaiko Langa Langa spin-off bands.

The name "Yoka Lokole", in lingala, means "listen to the lokole", where the lokole is a traditional log drum in the area of the Congo River.

== History ==
Yoka Lokole was founded as a consequence of a split of another prominent soukous band, Evoloko Jocker's Isifi Lokole. In November 1975, Papa Wemba, Mavuela Somo and Bozi Boziana left Isifi after a quarrel with Jocker. Two other Isifi members, Shora Mukoko and Otis Koyongonda, followed Wemba, Somo, and Boziana in the new ensemble.

In its early days, Yoka Lokole was overshadowed by two other greatly popular soukous bands, Zaiko Langa Langa and Isifi Melodia (the new name of Isifi Lokole after Papa Wemba's departure). This changed in 1976 when another singer, Mashakado Mbuta, joined the band. The first hit single released by Yoka Lokole was Matembelé Bangiì (June 1976) by Papa Wemba. Several other major hits followed, including Maloba Bakoko (by Somo), Mabita (Mashakado), and Lisuma Ya Zazu and Mama Walli (Papa Wemba). The band also created its own dance style, Mashakado-Au-Pas, that became a major craze in Kinshasa's dance club, together with Zaiko Langa Langa's Choquez and Isifi Melodia's Lofimbo. While Yoka Lokole was at its peak in popularity, yet another singer joined the impressive vocal lineup of the band, namely Djo Issa from Lita Bembo's Stukas.

In December 1976, the band was shaken by Papa Wemba's arrest for an alleged sentimental relation with the daughter of general Mobutu Sese Seko. While Wemba was in jail, the band kept touring in the Bas-Congo, something that Wemba complained about publicly. In the controversy that followed, which caused a considerable stir in Zaire's media, Mavuela and Mashakado flaunted their kinois (i.e., "of Kinshasa") heritage, implying that Papa Wemba (who was born in Kasai-Oriental) was "out of place" in Yoka Lokole. The lyrics of the song Bana Kin by Mavuela, released in late December 1976, are clearly related to this quarrel.

As a consequence of this situation, when Papa Wemba was released, he could not welcome in Yoka Lokole anymore. A legal dispute between Wemba and Mavuela over the use of name "Yoka Lokole" was cut by Wemba in February 1977, as he decided to call his own group Viva La Musica, a battle cry he used in Yoka Lokole's shows.

In the early months of 1977, some prominent members of Yoka Lokole, namely guitarist Syriana and drummer Otis Koyongonda, left to join Papa Wemba's Viva La Musica. New musicians were hired, namely singer Kanza Bayone (former Kiam member), guitarist Sec Bidens and Gabonese drummer Baroza nicknamed "La Gabonnia". With this new lineup Yoka Lokole had a few more hits, and popularized a new dance style, Mékroumé.

In the long run, Viva La Musica proved much more successful than Yoka Lokole; it actually became one of the most successful soukous bands ever. The "kinois" quarrel returned to the spotlights as the media criticized Somo and Mbuta for their contempt for the mowuta (i.e., the "non-kinois"). Yoka Lokole had one last success with Mandolina, but the departure of Bozi Boziana and Mbuta (who rejoined their former band Zaiko Langa Langa in August 1977) confirmed the band's decline.

In late 1977, Somo was the last "star" in Yoka Lokole's lineup. He tried to renew the band hiring new musicians, such as Packi Lutula from Tabu National, Fabrice Fanfan, Shimita Lukombo El Diego, Lifelo Moto Moto, and the Fataki brothers, and eventually released a few more singles that had some success, such as Testament (December 1977) and Tubela (July 1978). Nevertheless, in December 1978 Somo decided to leave Yoka Lokole. Guitarist Sec Bidens became the leader of the band, which quickly disappeared from the scenes.
