= Doukouré =

Doukouré is a surname. Notable people with the surname include:

- Cheick Doukouré (born 1992), Ivorian footballer
- Cheik Doukouré (born 1943), Guinean filmmaker
- Ismaël Doukouré (born 2003), French footballer
- Kevin Doukouré (born 1999), Ivorian footballer
- Mohamed Doukouré (born 1953), Guinean judoka
