= Masatomo =

- Gender: Male

Origin
- Origin: Japanese
- Meaning: Different meanings depending on the kanji used

Masatomo (written: 政友, 政朋, 正朋 or 匡智) is a masculine Japanese given name. Notable people with the name include:

- Masatomo Kuba (久場 政朋; born 1984), Japanese footballer
- Masatomo Nakazawa (中澤 匡智; born 1983), Japanese actor, voice actor and singer
- Sumitomo Masatomo (住友 政友; 1585–1652), Japanese businessman
- Masatomo Taniguchi (谷口 正朋; born 1946), Japanese basketball player
