= Emotion (Papa Wemba album) =

Studio album by Papa Wemba
- Released: 1995
- Studio: Real World, Box, Wiltshire; Studio Guillaume Tell, Suresnes
- Length: 38:16
- Label: Real World
- Producer: Stephen Hague

Papa Wemba chronology
Foridoles (1994)	Emotion (1995)	Pôle Position (1995)

Emotion is an album by the Congolese singer Papa Wemba, released in 1995. Wemba sang mostly in Lingala.

The album peaked at No. 14 on Billboard's World Albums chart. Wemba promoted it by touring North America.

== Production ==
The album was produced by Stephen Hague. "Fa Fa Fa Fa Fa (Sad Song)", a duet with Juliet Roberts, is a cover of the Otis Redding song; Redding was Wemba's favorite singer. Jean-Philippe Rykiel played keyboards on Emotion. Wemba addresses racism on "Epelo", heartbreak on "Ah Ouais", and the dangers in the world on "Sala Keba".

== Critical reception ==
Professional ratings
Review scores
Source	Rating
AllMusic	4.5/5 stars
Calgary Herald	A
Robert Christgau	A−
The Encyclopedia of Popular Music	3/5 stars
Houston Press	4.5/5 stars
MusicHound World: The Essential Album Guide	4.5/5 stars

The Guardian wrote that "Wemba's singing is high, relaxed and fine as ever, whether he's tackling a synth-backed funky dance piece, or switching to a guitar-backed ballad." Robert Christgau stated: "Piercing and penetrating without a hint of muezzin, he also commands a 'natural,' 'conversational' timbre richer and rangier than that of his more soft-sung Zairean colleagues."

The Toronto Star noted that "soukous purists likely won't have it... But terrific listening for everyone else." The Calgary Herald determined that "the propulsive, rolling polyrythmic rhythms here owe as much to western pop as to Wemba's Zairean traditions." The Houston Press concluded that "Hague insured that Wemba's vocals took center stage on each tune, turning down the driving African percussion just a notch."

AllMusic wrote that, "in mixing his unique brand of African soukous with various Western influences, Papa Wemba took a bold step into the international pop market already populated by Senegalese singing sensations Youssou N'Dour and Baaba Maal."

== Track listing ==
No.	Title	Writer(s)	Length
1.	"Yolele"	Lokua Kanza · Papa Wemba	3:22
2.	"Mandola"	Jacques Rouvier · Wemba	3:49
3.	"Show Me the Way"	Kanza · Wemba	4:01
4.	"Fa Fa Fa Fa Fa (Sad Song)"	Otis Redding · Steve Cropper	3:13
5.	"Rail On"	Kanza · Wemba	2:26
6.	"Shofele"	Maika Munan · Wemba	3:09
7.	"Image"	Christian Polloni · Wemba	4:20
8.	"Sala Keba (Be Careful)"	Kanza · Wemba	3:40
9.	"Awa Y' Okeyi (If You Go Away)"	Kanza · Wemba	1:55
10.	"Epelo"	Polloni · Wemba	4:02
11.	"Ah Ouais (Oh Yes)"	Rouvier · Wemba	4:19
Total length:			38:16
