= Isifi Lokole =

1974 soukous band from the Democratic Republic of the Congo

Isifi Lokole (later known as Isifi Melodia) were a soukous band from the Democratic Republic of the Congo. They were founded in 1974. The word "Isifi" is an acronym for "Institut du Savoir Ideologique pour la Formation des Idoles", while the lokole is a traditional Congolese drum. Since Isifi Lokole was mostly composed of former Zaiko Langa Langa members, it is sometimes said to be in the so-called "Langa Langa Clan".

== History ==
Isifi Lokole were a creation of Papa Wemba, who left Zaiko Langa Langa in the mid-1970s together with Evoloko Jocker, Mavuela Somo and Bozi Boziana. Isifi Lokolo had a widespread success in Congo; their most famous hit was Amazone. Despite this, in 1975 Papa Wemba, Somo and Boziana left to create another band called Yoka Lokole. Evoloko continued Isifi Lokole for a while, eventually changing the name of the band to "Isifi Melodia".

== Personnel ==
The original lineup of Isifi Lokole was:

- Evoloko Athsuamo (Evoloko Jocker): vocals
- Shungu Wembadio (Papa Wemba): vocals
- Mavuela Somo: vocals
- Bozi Boziana: vocals
- Chora Mukoko: guitar
- Djo Mali: bass guitar
- Biko: drums
- Otis Koyongonda: lokole drum

== Partial discography ==
- Ainsi va la vie, amazone (1975)
- Matembele bBangi, lisuma ya zazu (1976)
