= Orchestre Stukas =

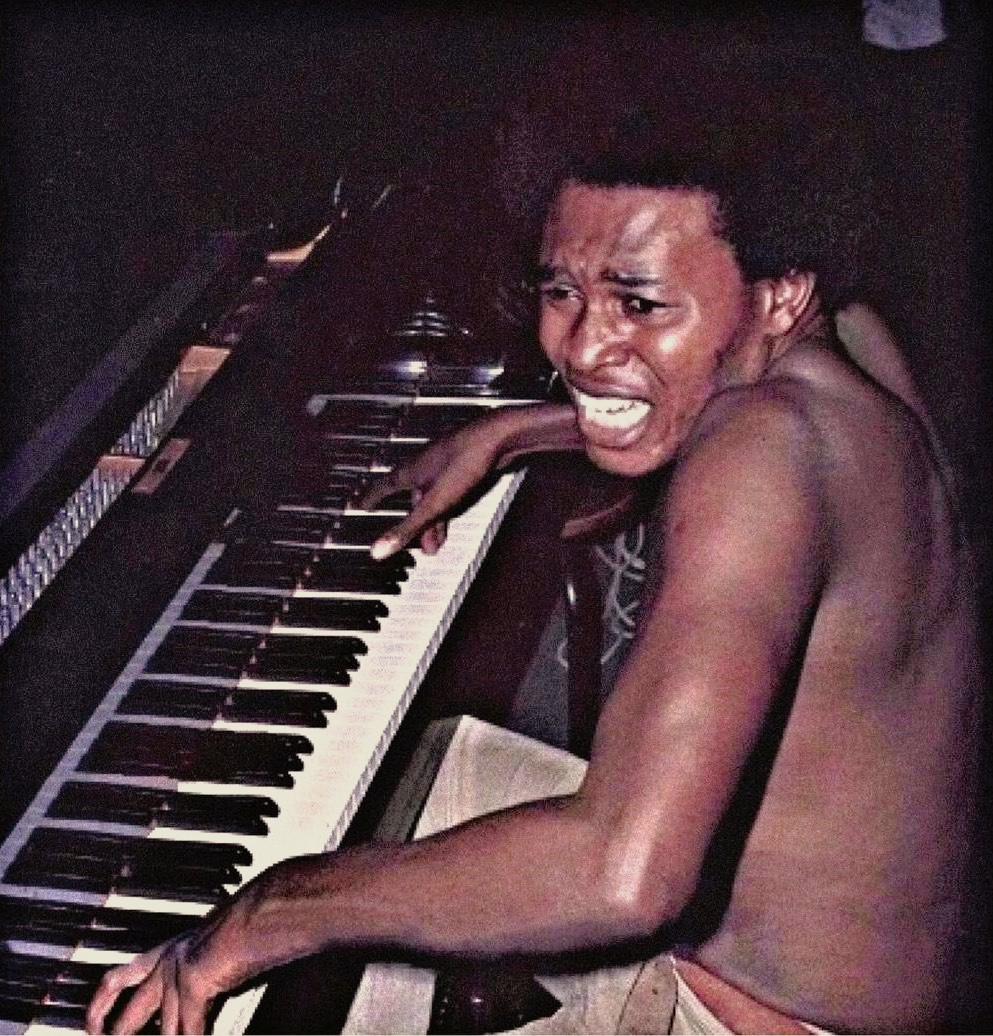
- Gaby Lita Bembo playing piano in the 1970s

Background information
- Origin: Kinshasa, Democratic Republic of the Congo
- Genres: Soukous; Congolese rumba

The Orchestre Stukas (also referred to as the Stukas Boys, the Stukas or the Stukas of Zaire) was a Congolese soukous band of the 1970s. It was based in Kinshasa, Zaire (now DR Congo). At the apex of their popularity, the Stukas were led by singer and showman Gaby Lita Bembo.

== History ==
The Stukas were founded by Alida Domingo in 1968. Since the band's early years, when the Stukas mostly played James Brown covers, two members of its personnel emerged as the most talented: singer Gaby Lita Bembo (who reportedly "set the audience on fire" with his on stage dancing) and guitarist Samunga Tediangaye, nicknamed "the professor". Also acclaimed guitarist Dodoly (nicknamed "the sewing machine" for his high speed solos) began his career in Stukas before his successful experience in Bozi Boziana's Anti Choc.

While great soukous bands such as Zaïko Langa Langa, Bella Bella or OK Jazz competed with each other for the favors of the Kinshasa youth, Stukas deliberately played in the outskirts, for the people in the suburbs, who could hardly afford going to the venues downtown to see musical shows. In the 1970 they already had a relatively large number of followers, so that they were invited by television channel Voix du Zaire to play in their shows. They became so popular that the Zairean authorities eventually put pressure on Voix du Zaire to let the Stukas appear on TV on a daily basis, because their shows helped "keep the children out of the streets". The Stukas also became the top band of the "Para fifi" club, one of the most important venues of Kinshasa.

In 1974, Stukas were invited to play at Zaire '74, a great musical event that was meant to introduce the so-called Rumble in the Jungle, i.e., the boxing match between Muhammad Ali and George Foreman. In Zaire '74, the Stukas had the chance to play side by side with international stars such as Miriam Makeba, Manu Dibango, B. B. King, and even their favourite James Brown. As a consequence of the Stukas' much appreciated performance at the event, Lita Bembo was acclaimed as the best Congolese artist of 1974 in a readers' poll of the popular Congolese newspaper Salongo.

Since 1977, Stukas experienced several personnel changes. Some of its members were invited to play by great soukous bands such as Yoka Lokole and Bozi Boziana's Orchestre Anti-Choc. Lita Bembo eventually left, to relocate to Brussels, where he began a new career as a producer and sound engineer. The Stukas recorded at least one album without Lita Bembo, called Ballade a Libreville. Lita Bembo also recorded some solo albums while he was in Europe, in the mid-1980s.

== Partial discography ==
=== Gaby Lita Bembo & the Stukas ===
- Kita Mata ABC

=== Stukas without Gaby Lita Bembo ===
- Ballade a Libreville

=== Gaby Lita Bembo solo albums ===
- Conflit
- Nouveau Rhythme Saccade
