= King Kester Emeneya =

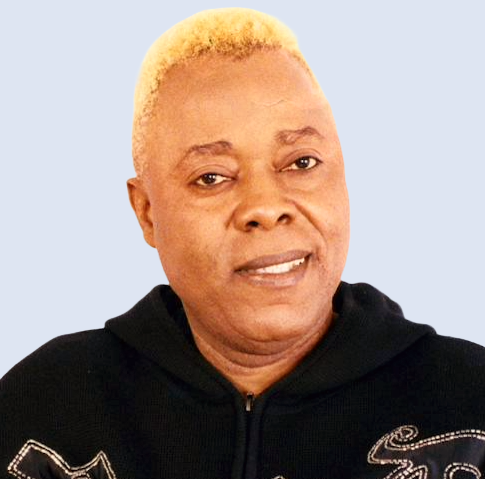
- Portrait of Kester c. 2014

Background information
- Born: Jean Baptiste Emeneya Mubiala Kwamambu; November 23, 1956; Kikwit, Kwilu, DR Congo
- Died: February 13, 2014 (aged 57) Paris, Île-de-France, France
- Genres: Soukous; World music; Congolese rumba; Rhythm and Blues
- Occupations: Singer-Songwriter, Dancer
- Years active: 1977–2014
- Label: Sonodisc

Jean Baptiste "King Kester" Emeneya Mubiala Kwamambu (23 November 1956 – 13 February 2014) was a Congolese singer.

== Early life ==
Jean was born in Kikwit within the Democratic Republic of the Congo. While attending the University of Lubumbashi as a political science student in 1977, King Kester joined the band Viva La Musica. After achieving success with several popular songs, he became one of the most popular African singers in the 1980s and created his own band, called "Victoria Eleison", on 24 December 1982.

== Career and contributions ==
Widely considered an innovator, Emeneya broke new ground in Sub-Saharan African music by being among the first to use music programming and synthesizers, as featured on his Nzinzi album, which sold millions of copies worldwide in 1987. Its title song became a hit, offering social commentary on men (married, single, or divorced) who adopt Don Juan–like tactics to seduce other men's partners. Favoring wealth and gifts over emotional commitment, they create discord and instability in relationships and homes. He introduced African music to an international audience by combining African motives with programming and contemporary R&B.

After being successful for several years, in 1993 he released Everybody distributed by Sonodisc. "Everybody" achieved international success, reaching a wide audience.

In 1997, after 7 years of absence, King Kester returned to the Congo. Nearly 80,000 people attended the first concert after his return, which was a record-setting feat according to the Congolese media.

Emeneya is considered by many to be one of the greatest African singers. He recorded more than 1000 songs and performed on all continents.

He promoted LA SAPE, a subculture centered on fashion, and designers like Gianni Versace, Masatomo, JM Weston, etc. Emeneya was also an actor in the movie "Les habits neufs du Gouverneur".

His interest and innovation were not confined to music, as Emeneya was an advocate for the African people and a civil rights fighter. He repudiated Apartheid in South Africa and released a song supporting Nelson Mandela while praising his cause and morale in his album Success Fous. Emeneya later performed at the Zénith Paris on 15 October 2001 and at the Olympia Hall on 13 April 2002.

During his last tour in the United States, while performing in Los Angeles in 2007, he praised the United States for making significant progresses on justice, equality, and race.

Emeneya was involved in charitable activities through his foundation. He was concerned about the level of poverty in the continent and wanted to make sure that governments in different African nations made enough efforts to improve the social lives of their citizens.

King Kester Emeneya was a supporter of Barack Obama, Bill Clinton, John F. Kennedy, Dwight Eisenhower, Franklin Roosevelt and Abraham Lincoln. Emeneya praised President Obama in a multiple number of his interviews for being an advocate of the poor.

Emeneya performed a concert in Kinshasa in 2009 to help celebrate Obama's inauguration as the first US black president. As a friend of the United States, he helped the US Embassy in Kinshasa celebrate July 4 several times, especially during the tenure of U.S. Ambassador Aubrey Hooks. King Kester Emeneya was also grateful to President Bush for his HIV and malaria initiatives in Africa. He released his album Le Jour Le Plus Long D-Day (The Longest Day) in 2007 to praise the US invasion of Normandy during World War II in France.

== Late life, death and recognitions ==
From 1991 until his death in Paris in February 2014, King Kester Emeneya lived mostly in France with his family. Emeneya's funeral was grandiose and is remembered in the history of Congo. It was broadcast live on multiple channels in Congo and relayed to many others around the world to his fan base.

On 6 April 2014, Pope Francis welcomed Emeneya's family to Vatican City to express his support. On 2 March 2014, Emeneya was awarded the presidential civic medal posthumously by President Joseph Kabila for his service and extraordinary contribution to Congolese nation and music, the highest civilian award to be bestowed by a Congolese president.

King Kester Emeneya was also awarded the title of Ambassador of Peace posthumously by the University of Birmingham in the United Kingdom on 21 February 2015.

On 25 April 2014, a tribute concert was held in his hometown of Kikwit, which ended in disaster, and at least forty people in the stadium lost their lives in a stampede following a power failure.

== Discography ==
- Milena (1977)
- Teint de Bronze (1978)
- Ndako ya Ndele (1979)
- Musheni (1979)
- Kayole (1979)
- Fleur d'ete (1978)
- Ngonda (1979)
- Dikando (1980)
- La Runda (1980)
- Ata Nkale (1979)
- Dembela (1981)
- Naya (1982)
- Ngabelo(1982)
- Okosi ngai mfumu(1983)
- Surmenage(1984)
- Kimpiatu(1985)
- Willo mondo(1985)
- Wabelo(1986)
- Manhattan(1986)
- Deux Temps(1987)
- Nzinzi (1987)
- Mokusa(1990)
- Dikando Remix (1991)
- Polo Kina (1992)
- Every Body (1993)
- Live in Japan (1991)
- Every Body (Remix) (1995)
- Pas de contact (1995)
- Succès Fous (1997)
- Mboka Mboka (1998)
- Never Again Plus jamais (1999)
- Longue Histoire (Volume 1 & 2) (2000)
- Live au Zénith de Paris (2001)
- Live à l'Olympia (Bruno COQUATRIX) de Paris (2002)
- Rendre à César ... ... ce qui est à César (2002)
- Nouvel ordre (2002)
- Le Jour Le Plus Long (2007)
- DVD Olympia Bruno COQUATRIX live 2008
