= Viva La Musica =

- Origin: Kinshasa, Democratic Republic of the Congo
- Genres: Soukous; world music; Congolese rumba
- Years active: 1977—present

Viva La Musica is a popular band from Zaire (now DR Congo) founded by singer Papa Wemba in 1977. While Viva La Musica started out as a soukous band (essentially a spin-off of Zaiko Langa Langa), it eventually grew into a world music act, reaching some popularity and success in the European, American, and even Asian markets, as well as in most of Africa. The band is still active today, although it is just one of a number of musical ensembles used by Papa Wemba as a backup for his essentially soloist production.

== History ==
Before creating Viva La Musica, Papa Wemba had already obtained popularity in Zaire (now DR Congo) as a member and singer of other prominent soukous band, most notably Zaiko Langa Langa, Isifi Lokole and Yoka Lokole, all of which were founded or co-founded by Wemba. In 1977, Wemba established the community of Molokai, in Kinshasa, a sort of musicians' commune. Viva La Musica was the main musical act from Molokai. It was at that time that Wemba got the nickname "Papa" by which he would be known thereafter. The name "Viva La Musica" was chosen as a tribute to American salsa star Johnny Pacheco, one of Wemba's major influences, who used the motto Que viva la musica ("long live music" in Spanish) in his performances. In fact, Papa Wemba had already used the Viva la musica! slogan in his former band Yoka Lokole, as a battlecry introducing sebene (dance) sections of their live performances, so the Congolese audience was already familiar with that name when Viva La Musica debuted in February 1977.

Viva La Musica's overall style was the outcome of a careful balancing of several elements, some of which of political nature. While the group would be dressed like Europeans (something that was not easily accepted by the "Africanist" government of Mobutu Sese Seko), this was counterbalanced by an explicit endorsement of Congolese tradition, including the use of lokole drums and Wemba's declared support for Mobutu's Authenticité campaign. One of the first songs of Viva La Musica was dedicated to Mobutu's wife.

The band was an instant success. Less than one year after their debut, the Elima newspaper awarded the band as "Best Orchestra" of Zaire, while Papa Wemba was declared "Best Singer" and one of their early hits, Mère Supérieure, was listed as Best Song. In the next two years, the band peaked several times at the top of the local charts, with hits like Moku Nyon Nyon, Mabele Mokonzi, Bokulaka, Princesse ya Sinza, Nyekesse Migue'l, and Cou Cou Dindon.

In 1979 Wemba spent six years in Paris, performing with group Afrisa International. When he came back to Zaire, Wemba's fascination with European habits, and especially with European fashion, became even more obvious in Viva La Musica recordings, with songs like La Firenze (a tribute to Italian fashion) and other that directly or indirectly mentioned fashion designers and brands. While much of Viva La Musica's production still reflected the complementary interest in Congolese tradition (for example, hit single Ana Lengo, selling half a million copies in Africa, was sung in kitelela language), the blatant violation of the government-imposed dressing code brought much criticism to the band from the press. This, however, did not affect the band's popularity, that easily filled venues with a capacity of dozen of thousands attendees.

In the early 1980s, Wemba neglected Viva La Musica to strengthen his collaboration relations with European (mostly French) artists. He stayed in Europe so long that rumors spread in Zaire about his alleged death. As a consequence of his absence, Viva La Musica went to pieces, and in 1982 14 of its 19 members had left. Wemba recreated the band in 1983 with a completely renovated lineup that released Rumba Rock-Frenchen, one of the first Zairean albums to sell well in the European market. This success convinced Wemba that it was time to "slam the door on Zaire", as he announced on his website. From that moment on, Viva La Musica's albums were explicitly conceived for the world music market rather than the Zairean-soukous audience. In 1986, the international status of the band was sealed by a tour that reached as far as Japan. At the same time, several members of the group were fired because, according to Wemba, they were not able to cooperate with non-African musicians and were not interested in any music except that of Zaire.

In 1987, the band actually relocated to Paris. Wemba's musical interests, anyway, already reached way beyond Viva La Musica. Solo productions (such as the eponymous Papa Wemba album of 1988) and collaborations with international artists (such as Peter Gabriel, Eric Clapton, Stevie Wonder, and others) became prominent. Viva La Musica was essentially reduced to a group of session musicians that Wemba would rely on when he was in Europe; but at the same time, he had other musical ensembles, such as Molokai International and Nouvelle Ecriture. This state of things was made clear by performances such as a pharaonic concert in Brussels in 1999, where Wemba led a huge band comprising Viva La Musica, Molokai, Nouvelle Ecriture, and even former Zaiko Langa Langa members.

== Dances popularized by Viva La Musica ==
As is common in the soukous tradition, Viva La Musica has introduced several dance styles in the Congolese popular culture. The list of dance styles created or popularized by the band includes:

- MoKoNyoNyon Nyon Nyon (Provoquer MoKoNyoNyon), Mokonyonyon Kaka Odimba (1977)
- Nyekesse Miguel, Nyekesse Elengi hein, Nyekesse Mputu (1978)
- Ba La Joie (1978)
- Mokonyonyon Sentiment Elela (1979)
- CooCoo Dindon, Awa Kaka (1979)
- Griffe Dindon (1980)
- Eza Eza (1981)
- Mansota (1982)
- Rumba Rock-Frenchen (1983)
- La Musselman (1984)
- La Firenze (1984)
- Se-Ya (1986)
- Kwassa kwassa (1987)
- Comme a l'ecole (1989)
- Le Pas qui va, le Pas qui revient (1990)
- Bouloukoutu (1991)
- Mingi Mingi (1993)
- Tuna Sortie (1994)
- Chege (1996)
- Nsu Nsengele (1999)
- Nkila Mogroso (2003)
