= Doudou Adoula =

- Born: July 23, 1965; Kinshasa, DR Congo
- Died: December 7, 2024 (aged 59) Brussels, Belgium
- Genres: Congolese rumba
- Occupations: Singer-songwriter; atalaku; composer

Antoine Pierre-Emmanuel Adoula Monga, professionally known as Doudou Adoula, (23 July 1965 – 7 December 2024) was a Congolese singer-songwriter, atalaku and composer, best known for his longstanding role in Zaïko Langa Langa.

== Early life and musical career ==
Antoine Pierre-Emmanuel Adoula Monga was born on July 23, 1965, in Kinshasa, to Cyrille Adoula, former Congolese Prime Minister (1961–1964) who died in 1978.

Adoula grew up in a politically prominent family but chose to pursue a career in music rather than politics. In the early 1980s, he started singing in several neighborhood groups, including Le Fleuron, where he performed alongside future notable artists including Pascal Poba and Jean-Marie Motingia. Later, he joined the group Il Fallait Kaka, which rivaled Wenge Musica, future flagbearer of a new wave of Congolese music in the 1990s. In 1985, Adoula became part of the Tout Choc Oka Elengi Eye orchestra in Kasa-Vubu as a singer and atalaku. Known as a training ground for future stars of Zaïko Langa Langa, this band also included figures including Cheikdan Mbuku, Carlyto Lassa and Malage de Lugendo.

Doudou Adoula's association with Zaïko Langa Langa began informally in 1987 when he occasionally filled in as an atalaku during the orchestra's concerts. His official entry into the group came in May 1988, at age 23, after a major split saw prominent members of the band quitting to form Zaïko Langa Langa Familia Dei. As Zaïko Langa Langa entered a phase of reconstruction under Jossart N'Yoka Longo, Adoula was recruited along with colleagues from Tout Choc Oka, including Shango Landu, Mafuta Mondial and Jean-Marie Motingia.

His first major contribution came during live performances in 1988, but he soon gained broader recognition with the band's studio album Jetez l'éponge, which debuted in December 1989. This revealed him to the audience performing alongside the legendary Nono Monzuluku. Nono had coached Adoula during his early moments in the band. In 1989, Adoula participated in Zaïko Langa Langa's European tour and contributed to the collaborative album Les Asiatiques, under the impetus of Bob Boto, where his first composition, "Bolongola Ngai Soni," was performed by Carlyto Lassa and Malage de Lugendo.

Over the years, Adoula participated in all international tours and recording on landmark albums, such as Ici ça va... Fungola motema (1990), named after one of Adoula's signature phrases during live performances, Jamais sans nous (1991), Avis de Recherche (1995). In 1996, Adoula composed his first song for Zaïko Langa Langa, "Anticorps," featured on the album Sans Issue. His later contributions included "Criminel d'amour" (2002) and "Bilan Négatif" (2019).

In 2011, Adoula played a pivotal role in the maxi-single Bande Annonce, which featured the classic "Boh." The maxi-single topped the Congolese Hit Parade in December 2011, followed by Techno malewa suite et fin by Werrason and Wenge Musica Maison Mère.

In 2023, Adoula retired from active participation in Zaïko Langa Langa to seek medical treatment in Belgium.

== Death ==
Adoula died on December 7, 2024, in Brussels, Belgium, at age 59.

== Selected discography ==
- Bongama Kamata Position (1987 album by Adios Alemba)
- Jetez l'éponge (1989)
- Les Asiatiques (1989)
- Ici ça va... Fungola motema (1990)
- Jamais sans nous (1991)
- Avis de Recherche (1995)
- Sans Issue (1996)
- Poison (1999)
- Eurêka (2002)
- Bande Annonce (2011)
- Sève (2019)
