= Cavacha =

Type of drum beat

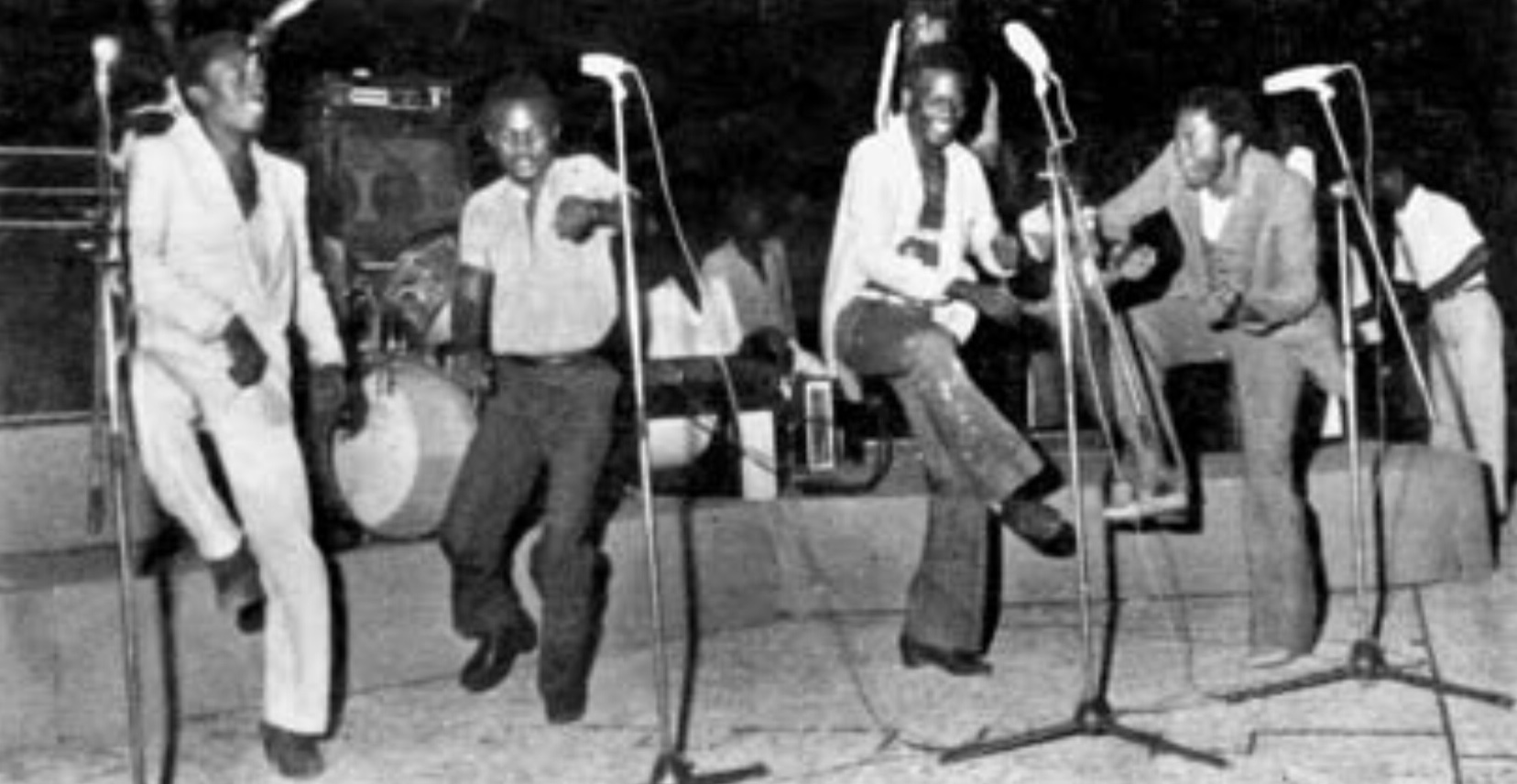
Zaïko Langa Langa performing in Kinshasa. From left to right: Evoloko Jocker, Bimi Ombale, Jossart N'Yoka Longo, and Cheikdan Mbuku.

Cavacha, also known as Masini ya Kauka or Machine ya Kauka, is a drumming pattern used in sebene, the instrumental section of Congolese rumba. Developed by Zaïko Langa Langa's longtime drummer, Meridjo Belobi, cavacha originated in the early 1970s in Kinshasa. Its origins are contested as one version attributed to Zaïko Langa Langa's founding members claims that Belobi devised the rhythm in 1971 while touring Pointe-Noire, inspired by the repetitive clattering of train wheels. Another version, recounted by Belobi himself, credits a local Kinshasa-based urban folk group whose drumbeats influenced him, especially a beat played on a large mbonda drum. He eventually adapted this pattern for Zaïko Langa Langa, integrating ghosted 16th notes to develop what became known as cavacha.

Regardless of its disputed origin, cavacha evolved into a defining rhythmic form that influenced generations and made waves across Central, East, and West Africa, as well as in Europe and Latin America. Beyond its percussive significance, cavacha is also synonymous with its eponymous dance style, introduced by Zaïko Langa Langa's vocalist Evoloko Jocker.

== Characteristics and variations ==
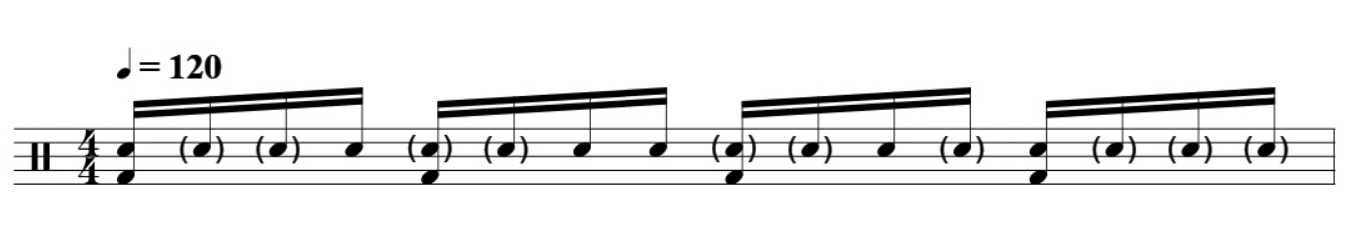
Cavacha original drum pattern or.

Cavacha's primary phrase is traditionally played on the snare drum, though it can also be executed on the hi-hat. The bass drum underscores the rhythm by striking on every beat, lending a robust, driving feel. The rhythm mainly utilizes the snare and bass drums, with variations manifesting through occasional fills or scattered crashes and hits. These variations, while numerous, consistently refer back to the original cavacha pattern. Songs devoid of a sebene section are the only exceptions that do not employ this rhythm.

== History ==
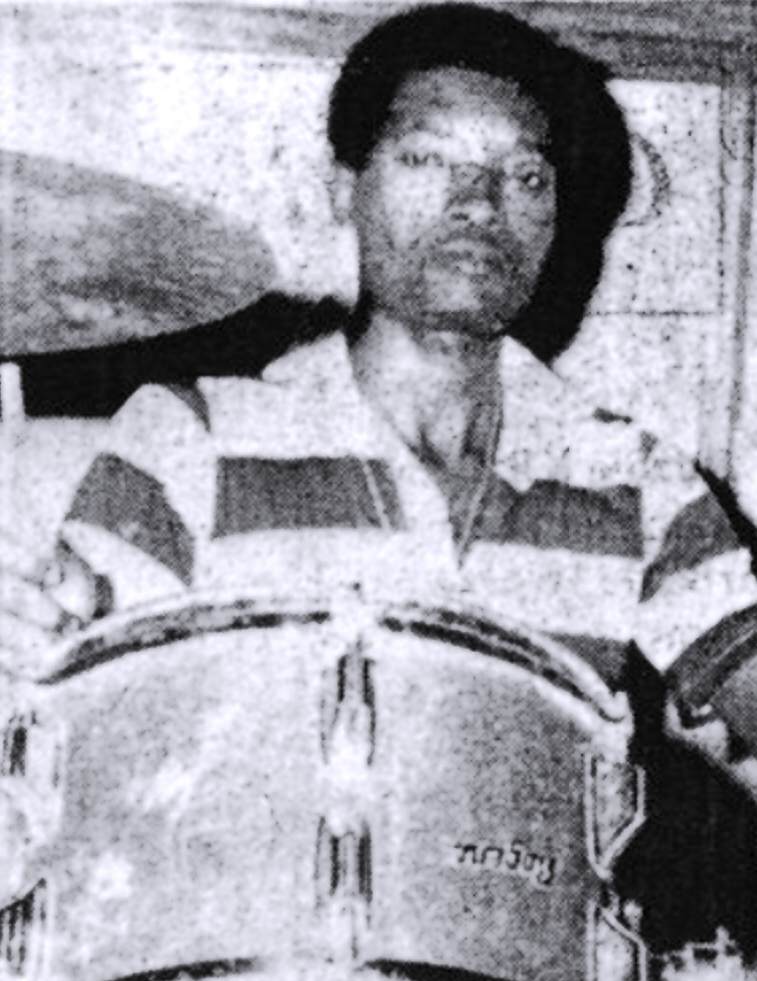
Drummer Meridjo Belobi in 1979

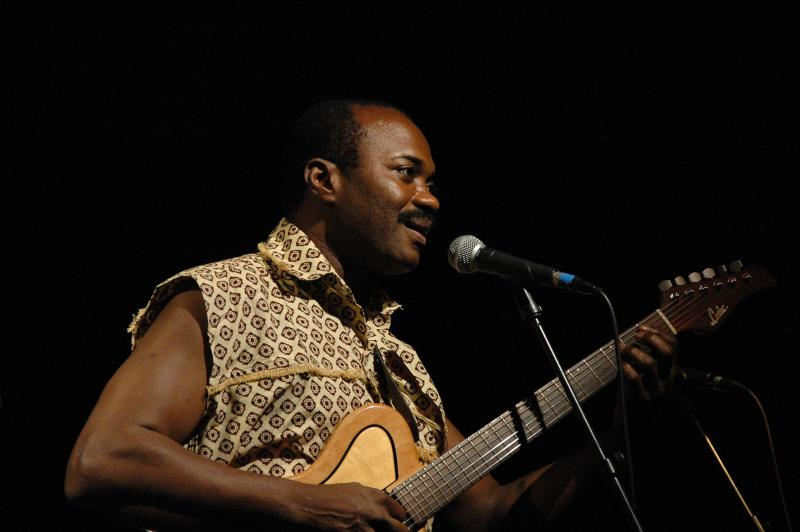
Félix Manuaku Waku performing in Lausanne 2005

=== Formation and influence on Congolese music ===
The origins of cavacha are subject to differing accounts, both of which ascribe its development to the early 1970s in Kinshasa. The first account, attributed to Zaïko Langa Langa's core members, suggests that the rhythm was conceived during a 1971 tour to Pointe-Noire from Brazzaville. As the band traveled overnight by train, they became enchanted by the repetitive churning of the locomotive's worn-down engine, mimicking the sound as ca va cha, ca va cha, ca va cha. According to Congolese cultural historian Zephyrin Nkumu Assana Kirikam, band member Mbuta Mashakado encouraged drummer Meridjo Belobi to replicate the rhythm on a drum kit, which then marked the beginning of an extended creative process. In a 2007 interview with Afriquechos.ch, Belobi recalled initial skepticism, describing the request as "incongruous" and admitting that he was doubtful. After returning to Kinshasa, he worked extensively to develop the rhythm. Assana noted that Belobi drew inspiration from a range of environmental sounds, including bird calls, animal footsteps, and mechanical noises, ultimately achieving a breakthrough that he likened to Archimedes' famed exclamation of "Eureka!" The rhythm was further developed and structured into Zaïko Langa Langa's musical identity with contributions from musicians such as Pierre Muaka Mbeka (Oncle Bapius), Félix Manuaku Waku, and Mbuta Matima. Oncle Bapius, as bassist, and Manuaku Waku, as lead guitarist, played key roles in harmonizing the rhythm, while Matima, as artistic director, was responsible for refining its tempo and overall integration into the band's sound.

A second version of the story comes from Belobi himself. In a 1996 interview with Bob W. White, a professor of social anthropology at the University of Montreal, Belobi recounted that he first encountered the rhythm while listening to a Kinshasa-based urban traditional ensemble. He described hearing it played on the large drum (mbonda mama) using a single stick. Intrigued, he memorized the rhythm, adapted it for Zaïko Langa Langa's musical arrangements, and introduced ghosted 16th notes, thereby creating cavacha as it is known today.

Regardless of its precise origin, cavacha became the foundational rhythm of modern Congolese dance music. It played a pivotal role in shaping the sebene, the high-energy instrumental section at the climax of a song, which is central to Congolese rumba and soukous. Meridjo Belobi, instrumental in cavacha's development, earned the nickname Masini Ya Kauka (Lingala for "the engine of Kauka").

=== Expansion ===
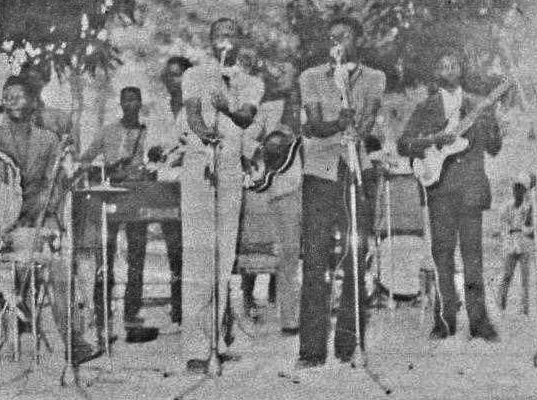
Performance in 1971. From left to right: Beaudoin Mitsho, Meridjo Belobi (behind), Enoch Zamuangana (behind), Teddy Sukami, Papa Wemba, Damien Ndebo (behind), Evoloko Jocker, and Félix Manuaku Waku

Cavacha also became associated with a dance style introduced by Zaïko Langa Langa's vocalist Evoloko Jocker. The dance gained popularity across Zaire (now the Democratic Republic of Congo) and beyond, propelled by broadcasts of the Tam-Tam d'Afrique radio program. Zaïko Langa Langa helped popularize the rhythm through landmark releases beginning in 1973, including "C'est La Vérité", "Onassis Ya Zaïre", "Eluzam", "Mbeya Mbeya", and Non Stop Dancing (1974). These recordings helped establish Zaïko Langa Langa as a leading force in the development of cavacha.

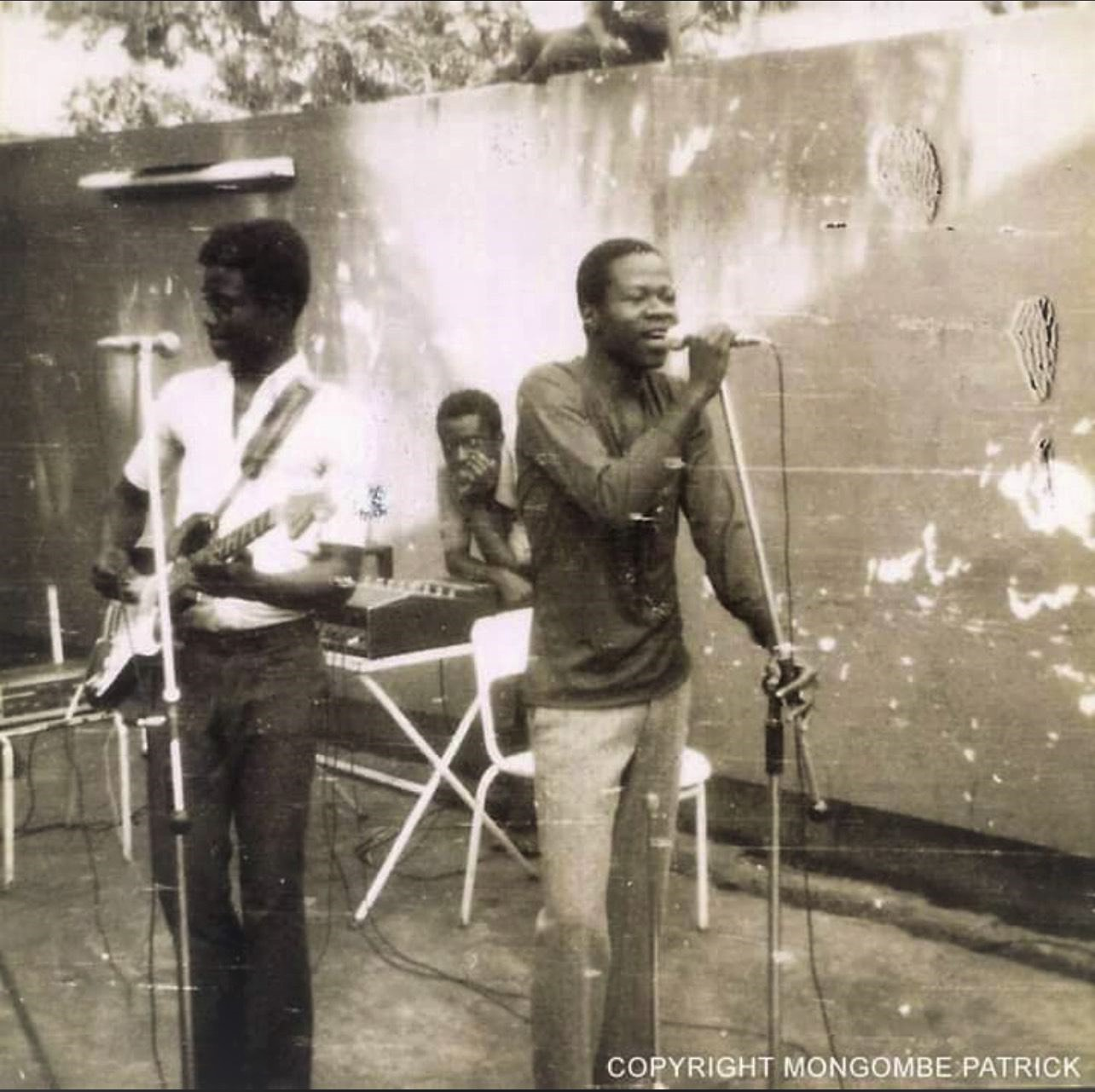
Papa Wemba and Félix Manuaku Waku, ca. 1972

In 1974, several key members, including Papa Wemba, Evoloko, Siméon Mavuela (also known as Mavuela Somo or Cheik Vuelas), and Bozi Boziana, left Zaïko Langa Langa to form Isifi Lokole. During this period, the cavacha dance, popular from 1973 to 1975, was gradually replaced by the choquez-retardé dance following Meridjo's imprisonment and replacement by Bakunde Ilo Pablo. Cavacha nevertheless remained influential, contributing to the formation of Orchestre Cavacha by Donat Mobeti, which included notable artists such as Mopero Wa Maloba and Mambo Ley, among others. They gained popularity with hits such as "Pichouna", "Tapale", "Luciana", "Ngembo Juger", and "Vicky Shama", which also amplified cavacha's reach.

==== Regional and global influence ====
By the early-to-mid 1970s, cavacha had become a defining rhythm of the sebene. Its influence spread into East and Central Africa, with bands such as Zaïko Langa Langa and Orchestra Shama Shama helping popularize it. In Nairobi, cavacha became closely associated with the Zairean sound and was incorporated into the music of regional bands, including Congolese rumba Swahili groups influenced by Tanzanian acts such as Simba Wanyika and its offshoots Les Wanyika and Super Wanyika Stars. The Nairobi-based Maroon Commandos incorporated soukous into their music. Japanese students in Kenya, including Rio Nakagawa, also became interested in Congolese music, leading to the formation of Yoka Choc Nippon, a Japanese-formed Congolese rumba band. Virgin Records contributed to the expansion of the rhythm by producing albums for the Tanzanian-Zairean Orchestra Makassy and the Kenya-based Orchestra Super Mazembe. The Swahili hit "Shauri Yako" gained widespread acclaim in Kenya, Tanzania, and Uganda. Another influential Zairean band, Les Mangelepa, relocated to Kenya and achieved immense popularity across East Africa. Zairean singer Samba Mapangala and his band Orchestra Virunga, based in Nairobi, released the LP Malako, a pioneering release in Europe's emerging world music scene. Between 1976 and 1977, Sam Mangwana and the African All Stars dominated Kinshasa's dance halls with records produced in West Africa, which differed from the sounds recorded in Kinshasa's two-track studios. This period marked a migration of artists to Lomé and Cotonou, followed by Franco Luambo's relocation to Belgium.

In Nigeria, soukous gained prominence through the transmission of Zairean music on Radio Brazzaville, introducing audiences to material from Zaire Vol. 6 (Soundpoint SOP 044, 1978). Soukous played a crucial role in the emergence of a distinct guitar-based Igbo highlife style, exemplified by musicians such as Oliver De Coque and the Oriental Brothers International. Across southern Africa, the genre's diffusion led to the development of offshoots, including Zimbabwe's popular sungura genre. Soukous influenced Latin American music, particularly in Colombia, where it contributed to the evolution of champeta. In France, artists such as Kassav, Maître Gims, Tabou Combo, and Magic System played significant roles in introducing cavacha to wider audiences.

=== Socio-economic context of the cavacha era ===
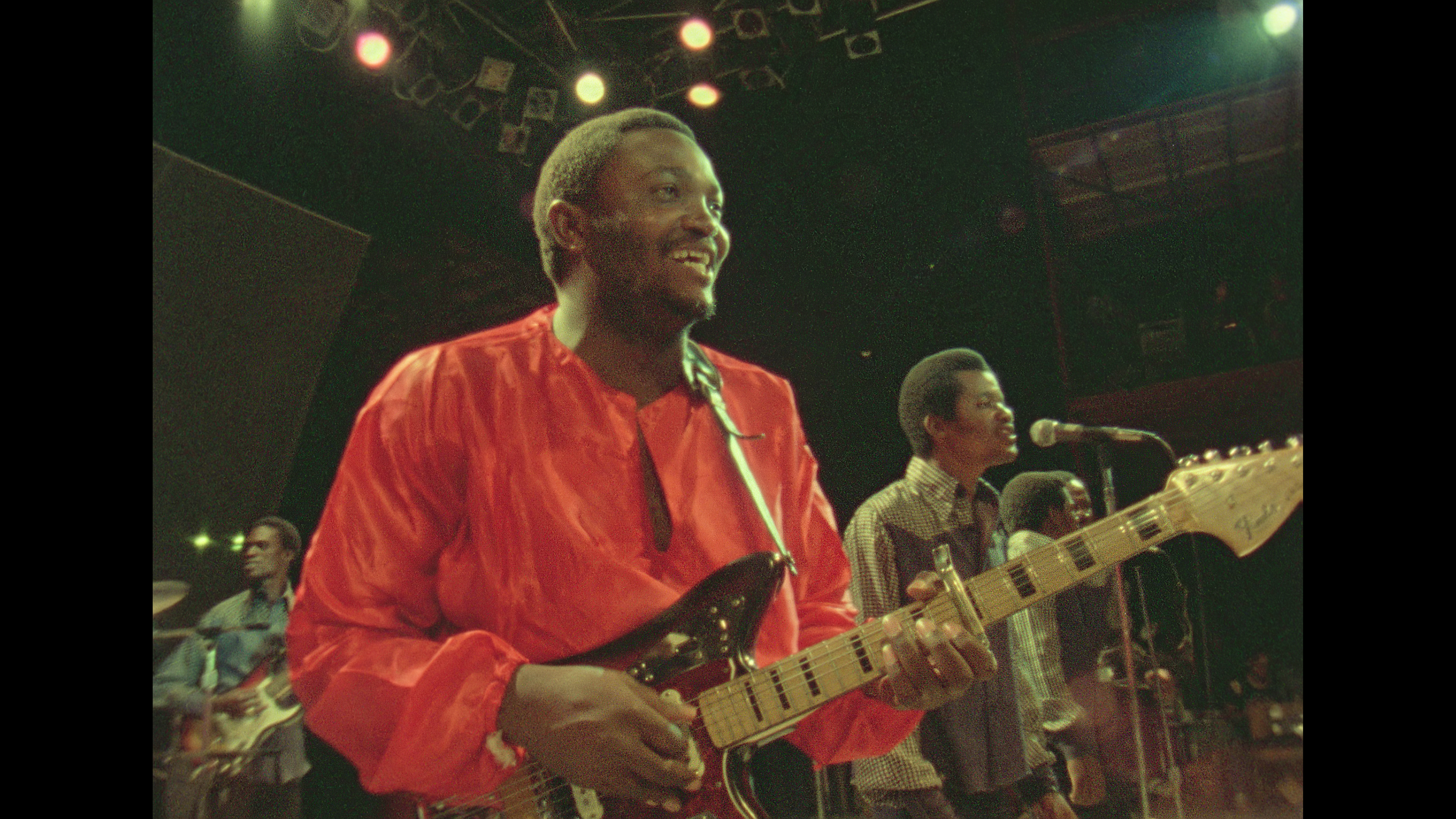
Franco Luambo performing with TPOK Jazz at Zaire 74.

Cavacha's rise coincided with a period of economic growth in Zaire, marked by major infrastructure projects and increasing international recognition. The 1974 Rumble in the Jungle boxing match between Muhammad Ali and George Foreman, preceded by an international music festival in which Zaïko Langa Langa performed, positioned Zaire on the global stage. During this period, Congolese politicians embraced music as a source of national pride, with slogans such as "Happy is the people that sings and dances".

== Examples ==
Zaïko Langa Langa, with Meridjo Belobi on drums, has numerous songs that feature the cavacha rhythm. Notable examples include:

- "Mbeya Mbeya" (1973)
- "Kwiti Kwiti" (1979)
- "Où es-tu Lomas?" (1996)

Beyond Congolese rumba, the cavacha rhythm has influenced and been incorporated into various other musical genres, such as coupé-décalé (in songs like "Djessimidjeka" by DJ Arafat), Zouk (as heard in "Mwen Malad Aw" by Kassav') and various African and Latin American styles.
