= Likinga Redo =

Congolese singer-songwriter (1954–2013)

- Born: Jean Likinga-wa-Nzadayi Mangenza; March 15, 1954; Kinshasa, Democratic Republic of the Congo
- Died: 8 August 2013 (aged 59) Reims, France
- Genres: Congolese rumba; soukous
- Occupation: Singer-songwriter
- Years active: 1973–2013
- Formerly of: Empire Bakuba; Zaïko Langa Langa; Zaïko Langa Langa Familia Dei; Boom des As; Fun Mus

Jean Likinga-wa-Nzadayi Mangenza (15 March 1954 – 8 August 2013), known professionally as Likinga Redo, was a Congolese singer-songwriter. He is best known for his decade with Zaïko Langa Langa (1975–1984), during which his tenor voice became an important part of the band's sound. During his time with the band, he composed and recorded songs including "Viya", "Manzaka Ebende", "Kamanzi" and "Antalia".

He began his recording career in 1973 with Empire Bakuba alongside Pépé Kallé. His tenure with Zaïko Langa Langa ended after his 1984 arrest and imprisonment in Portugal on narcotics charges. In the years that followed, he appeared with Zaïko Langa Langa Familia Dei, Boom des As, and Fun Mus. He eventually left secular music, settled in France and became an evangelical Christian. Likinga died in Reims in 2013, aged 59.

== Early life and career ==
=== 1954–1975: Early life and musical debuts ===
Jean Likinga-wa-Nzadayi Mangenza was born on 15 March 1954 in Léopoldville, Belgian Congo (now Kinshasa, Democratic Republic of the Congo). He began singing as a boy in the choir of the Catholic parish of Saint Paul de Barumbu, in Kinshasa. In 1968, he performed with several amateur quartiers (neighborhood) bands in the capital, Les Malou (also known as Malu Bonganga), Sensationnel and Carnaval de Rio, alongside guitarist Doris Ebuya, an early collaborator with whom he continued to work into the 1970s.

In 1973, Likinga and Doris Ebuya joined Empire Bakuba, a Kinshasa-based band formed by singer Pépé Kallé, José Dilu Dilumona and Papy Tex. He performed on and wrote several songs, including "Montese", a duet with Pépé Kallé that became his first popular success, along with "Djamani" and "Lemiya". He later described Pépé Kallé as a father figure in his musical life.

=== 1975–1987: Zaïko Langa Langa and 1984 arrest ===
In early 1975, Likinga and fellow singer Lengi Lenga (also known as Ya Lengos) joined Zaïko Langa Langa following the December 1974 departure of Papa Wemba, Evoloko Jocker, Bozi Boziana and Mavuela Somo, who had left to form Isifi Lokole. Likinga was recruited to the band by Blaise Bongania and Edo Mbuta. After several months of rehearsals at a site near present-day Nsele Valley Park on the outskirts of Kinshasa, the band gave a televised performance filmed at the RENAPEC studio in which Likinga was first presented alongside Lengos and Mbuta Mashakado (formerly of the band's pop section). His tenor voice became part of the band's vocal lineup alongside Jossart N'Yoka Longo, Bimi Ombale and Mashakado.

His first composition for the band, "Esikenebe", was released in 1977. That same year, Likinga was one of four Zaïko Langa Langa members, with Longo, Mashakado and guitarist Félix Manuaku Waku, selected by Tabu Ley Rochereau to join the Orchestre National du Zaïre (ONAZA) and to represent the country at FESTAC 77 in Lagos, Nigeria.

Throughout the late 1970s and early 1980s, Likinga performed regularly with Zaïko Langa Langa in concerts and studio recordings. He wrote several hits, including "Verra" (1978), "Ariya Kefi" (1979), "Déception Likinga" (1979) and "Viya" (1980). His 1983 hit "Antalia" became associated with the band's popularity during the rise of the zekete zekete dance. That year, he released the album Likinga Chante Olemi, which included two songs written by Olemi Eshar, Zaïko Langa Langa's administrative director. The album was recorded in 1982 at Studio Katy in Ohain, where Marvin Gaye had also recorded "Sexual Healing".

In early 1984, amid internal administrative disagreements with his colleagues, Likinga, who was also a successful businessman outside of music, traveled to Europe independently. He was arrested in Grândola, Portugal, on narcotics charges. He was subsequently convicted and sentenced to five years in a Portuguese correctional facility. His arrest ended his tenure with Zaïko Langa Langa. During Likinga's absence, JP Buse helped maintain the band's vocal lineup by performing his tenor parts. In 1986, his former colleague Pépé Kallé recorded "Souci Ya Likinga" ("My Sorrow for Likinga") with Empire Bakuba as a tribute to Likinga.

=== 1988–1997: Joining Familia Dei, solo career and group projects ===
Zaïko Langa Langa split in May 1988, resulting in the formation of Zaïko Langa Langa Familia Dei led by drummer Bakunde Ilo Pablo and vocalist Bimi Ombale. Following his release from prison in September 1988, Likinga joined the newly formed band. The group's musicians had appealed to government authorities for his release. At the time, Familia Dei was in Portugal to perform at the birthday celebration of Kosia Ngama, the second wife of President Mobutu Sese Seko.

Within his first year with the group, internal leadership disputes led to his dismissal. At the time, Likinga was in Switzerland performing a series of concerts with guitarist Félix Manuaku Waku and Mbuta Mashakado, who had also become a member of Zaïko Langa Langa Familia Dei. After relocating to France, he released his self-titled album Likinga Redo in 1990, arranged by Rigo Star. His next album, Bel Ami, followed in 1992. During the 1990s, Likinga worked as an independent session vocalist in Europe. In 1997, he returned to Kinshasa and co-founded the supergroup Boom Des As with Dindo Yogo, Ben Nyamabo, Djo Poster and Lengi Lenga. He later founded his own orchestra, Fun Mus.

== Later years, illness and death ==
In his later years, Likinga returned to Europe for medical treatment and settled in France. There, he left secular music and turned to evangelical Christianity. He received spiritual guidance from Adjina Djuma-Pili, leader of the Centre Évangélique "Espace de Prières". He began working with gospel singer Joujou Lumumba on a Christian music album, Repentance, which remained unfinished at his death.

Likinga Redo died on 8 August 2013 at the Hôpital Maison Blanche in Reims, France, at the age of 59. Contemporary reports attributed his death to cardiac arrest, while other reports stated that he had suffered from Alzheimer's disease for several years. His body was repatriated to Kinshasa on 23 August 2013, with the costs covered by the Democratic Republic of the Congo's embassy in Paris.

== Legacy ==
Likinga's tenor voice became an important part of Zaïko Langa Langa's vocal sound and directly influenced several vocalists who either filled his role during his absence or adopted his vocal style in their own careers. Yenga Yenga Junior joined Zaïko Langa Langa as Likinga's understudy, performing Likinga's vocal parts at live concerts due to the similarity between their voices. JP Buse, who joined Zaïko Langa Langa in late 1982, performed Likinga's tenor parts and later cited him as an influence on his vocal style. Djeffard Lukombo of Grand Zaïko Wawa also drew on Likinga's bright vocal placement and upper-register pitch control in his performances with various Congolese rumba bands. Adamo Ekula integrated a comparable high-tenor phrasing into his work with Grand Zaïko Wawa and Zaïko Langa Langa.

== Personal life ==
At the time of his death, Likinga was reported to have had four children. The year before he died, he lost a daughter, Viya, then in her thirties, born of what was described as "a turbulent relationship with a woman from Brazzaville". His relationship with Anna Muyanzi, who was referenced in several of his Zaïko-era compositions, ended with her death in Kinshasa in 1979. They had no children. At the time of his death, Likinga was married to Charlotte "Charlie" Likinga.

== Discography ==
=== Solo albums ===
- Likinga chante Olemi (1983)
- Likinga Redo (1990, also referred as Maliya)
- Bel Ami (1992)
