= Jossart N'Yoka Longo =

Jossart N'Yoka Longo ONL, ONH
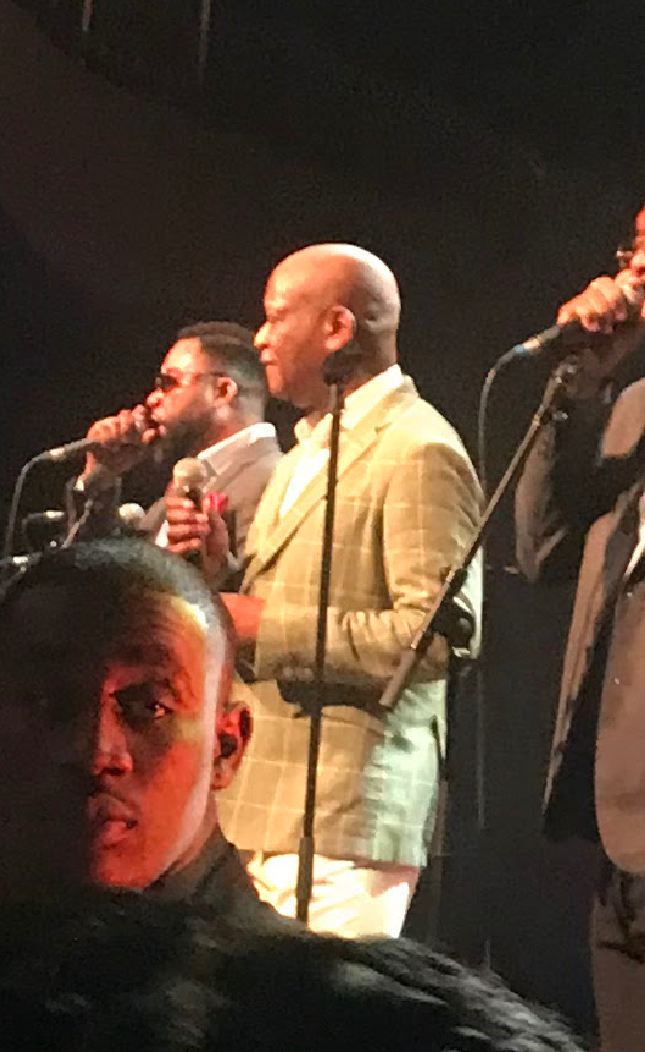
- Jossart N’Yoka Longo in 2024.

Background information
- Also known as: Jehrsy Jossart; N’Yoch N’Yoka Longo
- Born: Joseph Roger N'Yoka M'Vula; September 7, 1953 (age 73); Léopoldville, Belgian Congo (now Kinshasa, DRC)
- Genre: Congolese rumba
- Occupations: Singer; songwriter; record producer; composer; bandleader
- Instruments: Vocals; percussion
- Years active: 1969–present
- Label: ProZal – Production Zaïko Langa Langa
- Member of: Zaïko Langa Langa

Joseph Roger N'Yoka M'Vula (7 September 1953), known professionally as Jossart N'Yoka Longo, is a Congolese singer, songwriter, producer and bandleader, best known as leader of Zaïko Langa Langa. Affectionately dubbed "Vieux Bombas", he was immersed in Kinshasa's dynamic music scene from an early age. He began his artistic journey with the local band Bel Guide National, based in Dendale. In December 1969, he became the third member of Zaïko Langa Langa, alongside Papa Wemba and Félix Manuaku Waku, one of the most influential and innovative musical forces in Africa, redefining the contours of Congolese rumba.

Distinguished by his nasal vocal timbre, dance moves, and songwriting, N'Yoka Longo quickly emerged as one of Zaïko Langa Langa's main attractions. By the early 1980s, he had taken the helm of the group, leading it through decades of musical evolution and international success. Some of his most popular compositions include "Sentiment Awa", "Dede Sur Mesure", "SVP Mbey", and "Paiement Cash". Though he never pursued a full solo career, he participated in collaborative ventures such as the album Bilombe Bakutani, recorded with Papa Wemba and Bimi Ombale. A key innovation credited to N'Yoka Longo is the introduction of atalaku into Congolese rumba, vocalists responsible for actively engaging the audience, building excitement, and augmenting the performance with spirited vocalizations and rhythmic chants.

Under his leadership, Zaïko Langa Langa toured extensively, gracing prestigious stages across Africa, Europe, Asia, and North America. Notable performances include appearances at the Paris Zenith, Elysée Montmartre, Bataclan, Cirque d'Hiver, and La Madeleine.

In recognition of his lifelong contribution to Congolese music and culture, N'Yoka Longo was decorated in December 2015 as a Knight in the Order of the National Heroes Kabila-Lumumba. Since September 2021, he has served as the director of SOCODA (Société Congolaise de Droits d'Auteur et Droits Voisins). With a career spanning over half a century, Jossart N'Yoka Longo remains a towering figure in African music and a living symbol of Congolese cultural excellence. In 2024, he was awarded the prestigious Rumba Prize, honoring his impact on the genre over more than five decades.

== Early life and career ==
=== 1953–1970: Childhood, education and music debut ===
Joseph Roger N'Yoka M'Vula was born on 7 September 1953 in the Commune of Kinshasa, Léopoldville (present-day Kinshasa), in the Belgian Congo (now the Democratic Republic of the Congo). He was the second and last child in his family. His mother, Elisabeth Saka Mayamba, was a banana vendor in the local markets, while his father, Daniel M'Vula Malembe, worked as a gardener for the Philips Congo company. N'Yoka grew up with his elder sister, Albertine Longo, who was born in 1951.

During his early childhood, the family relocated to the Commune of N'Djili, where he spent most of his formative years. He first attended École Saint-André, where he also joined the choir of the Église Saint-André, refining his vocal abilities. He later completed his secondary education at Collège Albert Ier. He lost his father, Daniel, in 1964. It was during these years, as he began showing an early interest in singing, that he was nicknamed Jossart, a French-derived acronym meaning José sera artiste ("José will be an artist"). Although immersed in music from a young age, Jossart initially did not aspire to a musical career. He maintained close relationships with local priests, which took care of him (as well as the Philips Congo company) after the early passing of his parents, and even considered entering the priesthood.

In 1969, at the age of 16, Jossart joined a local youth band named Bel Guide National, based in the Dendale district (present-day Kasa-Vubu) alongside Félix Manuaku Waku. The group was founded by Pierre Zinga, also known as Perzy, and included D. V. Moanda in its administrative ranks. Jossart quickly distinguished himself as a talented songwriter; one of his earliest compositions, "Amour Hebdo", would later be released under the title "Oyebaka".

On 23 December 1969, a young man named Jules Shungu Wembadio, singing under the stage name Jules Presley, attended a rehearsal of Bel Guide, accompanied by guitarist Félix Manuaku Waku. Impressed by their performance, Moanda and the administrators decided to dissolve Bel Guide in favor of forming a new band, centered around the emerging talents of Jules and Manuaku. The next day, on 24 December 1969, a foundational meeting took place at the residence of the Mangaya family, located at 10 Avenue Popo Kabaka in the Kasa-Vubu commune. The band Zaïko Langa Langa was born. Jossart was not present at the meeting, as he was attending a concert by the group Thu-Zaïna, but was informed of the new band's formation. He was soon brought in as one of its vocalists, alongside Jules Presley. At the time, he performed under the stage name Jehrsy Jossart.

The first rehearsal of Zaïko Langa Langa took place on 26 December 1969 at 7 Rue Luozi, the Mangaya family residence. The ensemble included Jehrsy Jossart N'Yoka Longo and Jules Presley Shungu as vocalists, Félix Manuaku Waku on lead guitar, Teddy Sukami on rhythm guitar (still learning the instrument), and Enoch Zamuangana as a third guitarist. Jossart sang in Zaïko Langa Langa's debut concert on 24 March 1970, held at the Bar Dancing Hawaï in the Yolo-Nord district of the Commune of Kalamu. Shortly thereafter, the group recorded its first tracks at the Philips studio, including one of Jossart's original compositions, "La tout neige". The track was released on the Polydor label, paired with "Francine Keller", a song by Evoloko Jocker.

Still in March 1970, Bimi Ombale joined Zaïko Langa Langa as the group's drummer. At this time, Jossart also briefly played drums as his stand-in.

=== 1971–1982: Standalone releases, bandleader of Zaïko Langa Langa ===
"La Tout Neige" entered the Zairian hit parade and marking his first success as a composer. Over the next years, he established himself as one of Zaïko Langa Langa's main creative forces, not only contributing vocals but also composing numerous songs for the band. In 1971, N'Yoka Longo composed "Mado" and "Ma", followed in 1972 by "Nimerita" and "Mbuli Ya M.T." He initially performed duets with Shungu Wembadio (Papa Wemba), and soon became a key supporter of Bimi Ombale during his transition from drummer to vocalist—a move that was met with resistance from other band members at the time.

Throughout 1973, N'Yoka Longo released several tracks including "Errare Humanum Est", "Michelis-Fe", and "Selenge". That same year, Zaïko Langa Langa received its first major recognition, being named Best Orchestra at the Referendum de l'Association de chroniqueurs musicaux du Zaïre (ACMZA). During this period, N'Yoka experienced a personal loss with the death of his elder sister, Albertine Longo, an event that profoundly affected him. In tribute, he adopted the name Jossart N'Yoka Longo, incorporating her surname. In early 1974, he recorded the hits "Ngadiadia" and "Amando", and later that year participated as a vocalist with Zaïko Langa Langa in the Zaire 74 music festival, held in Kinshasa. In December 1974, the group experienced its first major split, with Papa Wemba, Evoloko Jocker, Bozi Boziana, and Mavuela Somo departing to form Isifi Lokole. To maintain the band's momentum, N'Yoka Longo released "Bambela" (originally titled "Na Lingi Yo Na Pluriel").

In 1975–76, Zaïko Langa Langa toured Togo and Ghana, and under the supervision of Henri Bowane, recorded their second studio album, Plaisir de l'Ouest Afrique (1976) in Accra. N'Yoka contributed the songs "Ma", "Bomwana", and "Saloti". That same year, he released "Nalali Pongi", a song reflecting on his sister's death. The track won Best Song of the Year (1976), and the band was once again voted Best Orchestra.

In 1977, N'Yoka Longo was selected to join the Orchestre National du Zaïre (ONAZA), alongside Likinga Redo, Manuaku Waku, and Mbuta Mashakado. The ensemble performed at FESTAC 77 in Lagos, Nigeria, where he performed "Nalali Pongi" alongside artists such as Tabu Ley Rochereau. That year, he also released the single "Lidjo" with Zaïko Langa Langa.

In 1978, N'Yoka participated in Zaïko Langa Langa's first European tour, and in late 1978, he released "Sentiment Awa", a song that became a defining classic for both himself and the band. A second version of the song, recorded in March 1979, earned him second place in the ranking of Best Songwriters of the Year, while the band was ranked fourth-best group of the year. That year, N'Yoka also released the hit singles "Mimi C'est Trop Tard", "Chérie N'Zemo", and "Pa Oki." In 1980, he followed with "Nalapa Ndayi" and later "Crois-moi", which would appear on the 1983 LP L'Orchestre de Tous les Âges. The band's LP, Gitta présente le Tout-Choc Zaïko Langa Langa, was released in 1981, featuring two compositions by N'Yoka Longo: "Mobembo" and "Confiance." The following year, the band released "Tout Choc, on which he contributed "Amour Suicide." Both albums were recorded during the VISA 1980 European tour, organized by Franco Luambo, which Zaïko Langa Langa did not complete due to internal disagreements.

During this same European tour, Teddy Sukami, who had taken over as band conductor after Manuaku Waku's departure in 1980, also left the group to pursue a solo career. As a result, Jossart N'Yoka Longo assumed leadership of Zaïko Langa Langa, becoming the band's frontman. He was the first Congolese artist to be referred to as President, a nickname that would later become a common title for musical bandleaders in Congolese music.

In 1982, Zaïko Langa Langa released a double LP recorded in Brussels, which included the hit "SOS Maya", composed by N'Yoka Longo. Upon returning to Kinshasa, the band faced a hiatus after ending their contract with Verckys. To revitalize the group, N'Yoka proposed the recruitment of three new members from the Kintambo-based band Bana Odéon—Nono Monzuluku, Bébé Mangituka, and Djerba Manzeku—whom he admired. During the official televised presentation of the album on 30 October 1982 on the program Variété Samedi Soir, spectators witnessed a pivotal innovation in Congolese music history: the introduction of atalaku (also known by the French term animateur), a form of vocal hype chant, into a contemporary Congolese band. The term atalaku was derived from their first chant "Ah, tala ku!" in the Humbu language. This stylistic addition, spearheaded under N'Yoka Longo's direction and initially mocked by music listeners, would go on to influence virtually every major band in Congolese music for decades to come.

Still in 1982, N'Yoka Longo collaborated with fellow Zaïko Langa Langa luminaries Papa Wemba and Bimi Ombale on the album Bilombe Bakutani, released under the banner Le Trio N'Yo-Bi-We, an acronym formed from the first syllables of their names. N'Yoka Longo contributed the track "Ami Mondzo", dedicated to producer Chirac Mondzo.

=== 1983–2000: "SVP Mbey", Nippon Banzai and SONECA presidency ===
As the 1980s unfolded, Jossart N'Yoka Longo transitioned into a broader leadership and creative direction role within Zaïko Langa Langa, consolidating his position as a pillar of the band's identity and longevity. While he did not contribute vocally to the band's tenth studio album, On Gagne le Procès (1984), he shared artistic direction responsibilities with Mbuta Matima. The band experienced a prolific phase in 1985, releasing two notable albums: Zaïko Eyi Nkisi and Tala Modèle Échanger. On these records, N'Yoka Longo contributed the songs "SVP Mbey" and "Daïd'ano", respectively.

In early 1986, Zaïko Langa Langa sustained its momentum with the release of three more albums, including Pusa Kuna...Serrez ! Serrez !, which featured N'Yoka Longo's composition "Paiement Cash." Later that year, in October, the band embarked on its first tour of Japan. It later culminated in the recording of Zaïko Langa Langa's sixteenth album, Nippon Banzai, an ambitious endeavor spearheaded by N'Yoka Longo himself. Tensions escalated within Zaïko Langa Langa's administration in 1987, ultimately erupting into a leadership crisis that splintered the band in May 1988. A significant number of veteran members, led by Bimi Ombale and Bakunde Ilo Pablo, broke away to form a spin-off, Zaïko Langa Langa Familia Dei. Jossart N'Yoka Longo, backed by a core of eight remaining musicians, undertook the challenging task of reconstructing the original ensemble. In the wake of the split, public disputes between the two factions surfaced in the form of sharp media interviews, as N'Yoka and his former colleagues exchanged pointed criticisms in the Congolese press.

Despite these setbacks, N'Yoka Longo remained resolute. In December 1987, the band released Subissez les Conséquences, an album in which he performed vocally though he did not contribute any compositions. The following year, he led the remaining members to Brussels, where they recorded Jetez l'Éponge—Zaïko's eighteenth album—following the conceptual structure of Nippon Banzai. N'Yoka included two reimagined versions of previous hits: "SOS Maya" and "Pa Oki." Between 1990 and 1991, Zaïko Langa Langa entered a period of renewal and commercial success, releasing two albums: Ici ça va ! Fungola Motema and Jamais Sans Nous. N'Yoka Longo contributed the song "Dédé", which rapidly gained popularity and would later be re-recorded for the 1995 release Avis de Recherche. This latter album featured a concentrated display of N'Yoka's songwriting, including the tracks "Zekira", "Nzete Ya Mbila", "Molingano", "Mukaji", and a revamped version of his earlier hit "Amour Suicide." Originally, Avis de Recherche was conceived as N'Yoka Longo's first solo project, but it was ultimately released under the Zaïko banner. Zaïko produced the albums Sans Issue (1996) and Backline Lesson One (1997) during European tours.

Jossart N'Yoka Longo took on institutional responsibilities in the national music industry. From 1991 to 1993, he was appointed Director of SONECA (Société Nationale des Éditeurs, Compositeurs et Auteurs), the organization responsible for managing copyright and royalties for Zairian artists. In 1992, alongside fellow artist Koffi Olomide, he was arrested in Kinshasa after being summoned by the Attorney General's office. The two were accused of promoting obscenity through their musical performances and lyrics. Following three days in custody, they were released and swiftly resumed their musical careers.

In April 1998, Zaïko released its 24th studio album, Nous y sommes, composed of seven tracks. Among them were two pieces penned by N'Yoka Longo—new versions of his earlier compositions "Paiement Cash" and "Amando." This album served primarily to highlight the talents of newly recruited members and to reposition the band amid changing musical landscapes. In September of 1999, Zaïko Langa Langa issued the album Poison, featuring 10 songs. Jossart N'Yoka Longo was credited as the composer of "Liloba" and "Tonton Ben B."

=== 2002–2011: Zenith concert, imprisonment and resurgence ===
On 7 September 2002, in celebration of his 49th birthday, N'Yoka Longo led Zaïko Langa Langa onto the prestigious stage of Zénith Paris, where they delivered a five-hour sold-out performance. The concert not only marked a triumphant return to one of Europe's most iconic venues but also initiated another round of touring. However, this period of success was abruptly complicated by bureaucratic hurdles: following the Paris concert, the band became stranded in Brussels for an extended period of seven years due to unresolved legal and immigration issues.

In November 2003, Jossart N'Yoka Longo was arrested in Belgium on charges related to the possession of counterfeit visas, a serious offense that led to his incarceration in preventive detention in Brussels. This unexpected legal ordeal kept him behind bars for approximately a month. His arrest generated considerable controversy in the Congolese artistic and political spheres, prompting swift intervention. The Congolese Ministry of Culture, along with the Société Nationale des Éditeurs, Compositeurs et Auteurs (SONECA) and the cultural organization UMUCO, launched a public campaign demanding his release. Ultimately, it was the Congolese head of state who intervened, posting bail and securing his release in June 2004, bringing a temporary close to this chapter of legal uncertainty.

Despite the personal and logistical challenges that came with being effectively marooned in Europe during what became a seven-year period of forced exile, N'Yoka Longo continued to pursue his artistic vision with unrelenting determination. During this time, Zaïko Langa Langa remained active on the live circuit and managed to release three albums that would add depth to the group's rich discography: Euréka, Empreinte, and Rencontres.

Released during this extended European stay, Euréka saw N'Yoka Longo contribute two tracks, "Eza Nga !" and "Ngoma Esprit De Famille". Empreinte, released on December 3, 2004, marked a significant creative moment. On this record, he composed four standout tracks: "Qui dit mieux", "Jusqu'où" in duet with Sam Mangwana, "Les 19 minutes de Ngwasuma," and a rendition of his classic "Nzete Ya Mbila."

In 2007, Zaïko Langa Langa released Rencontres, launched on September 7, aligning with N'Yoka Longo's birthday. This album represented an effort to bridge the generational and stylistic gaps within Congolese rumba. He reunited with several former collaborators including Beniko Popolipo, Bopol Mansiamina, Malage De Lugendo, and his early musical influence, Tony Dee Bokito, formerly of Los Nickelos. However, despite the impressive lineup, Rencontres suffered from a lack of promotional support and media visibility. By February 2009, after nearly a decade away from his homeland, N'Yoka Longo decided it was time to return to Kinshasa. He returned with only eight musicians, as many original members had opted to stay in Europe. Some of those who remained abroad went on to form a short-lived ensemble dubbed Les Stars de Zaïko, which ultimately failed to gain traction.

In July 2010, Zaïko Langa Langa received new musical equipment from the governors of Kinshasa and Brazzaville, a symbolic gesture acknowledging the group's immense cultural contribution. This occurred in the context of Zaïko being crowned the "Best Orchestra of the Fiftieth Anniversary of the Two Congos"—a dual celebration marking the independence of both the Democratic Republic of Congo and the Republic of Congo.

A significant moment in the band's comeback arrived on August 6, 2011, with the release of the album Bande Annonce. This album marked a triumphant return for N'Yoka Longo and his group. He was credited as the composer of all tracks, with the exception of "Eka," composed by Tony Dee. The album's standout feature was the dance "Mukongo ya Koba"—translated from Lingala as "the turtle's back"—which became a cultural phenomenon. The choreography associated with the track won the award for "Best Dance" at the 9th edition of the Trophée Muana Mboka.

=== 2014–present: Sève and European tours ===
Building on the success of Bande Annonce, the band released an EP remix titled Sisikaaaaaahh! Moto na moto na... on August 2, 2014. This project capitalized on the popularity of their hit dance "Maman Siska," and featured additional content including a new song and a bonus track. Produced by Dios Mena and distributed through Prozal, the EP included the single "Susu Atambuli Yenga", which became a radio and street hit in Kinshasa, further cementing the band's revitalized presence in the national music landscape.

Between October 2018 and April 2019, Jossart and Zaïko Langa Langa embarked on a transatlantic tour, performing across the United States and Canada, reestablishing its foothold among the Congolese diaspora. On September 7, 2019, the group marked its 50th anniversary with the release of a landmark album, Sève—a title that symbolizes "sap" or "vital essence," a fitting metaphor for a band that had remained creatively fertile over five decades. N'Yoka Longo's lead composition on the album, "Système Ya Benda," offered a scathing critique of the deteriorating moral climate in contemporary Congolese society. The song boldly condemned issues such as jealousy, duplicity, social betrayal, and spiritual poisoning. Additional contributions from N'Yoka included "Yaka M," "Alita Wanyi," "Sielumuka," "Ambiance Eyenga," and fresh renditions of "Amour Pluriel" and "Boh."

After more than a decade away from European stages, N'Yoka Longo and Zaïko returned in full force with a performance at the Palais des Beaux-Arts in Brussels on February 29, 2020, celebrating the band's golden jubilee. Though met with some resistance, approximately forty manifestants called Les Combattants protested outside the venue, the show went on without incident and was a resounding success. Continuing their resurgence, Jossart N'Yoka Longo and Zaïko Langa Langa performed at London's Clapham Grand on May 16, 2024. Just days later, on May 19 and again on June 14, the band played sold-out shows at Brussels' Salle de la Madeleine.

On April 24, 2026, N'Yoka and Zaïko Langa Langa performed at a sold-out Zenith Paris, 24 years after their first performance in the same arena.

== Personal life ==
=== Family and relationships ===
Jossart N'Yoka Longo is the father of nine children. In the early 1970s, he was in a relationship with Marie-Thérèse Mbuli, with whom he had dedicated his 1972 song "Mbuli Ya M.T.". She was the mother to his first daughter, Sandra Mercy. The relationship later ended. Although meeting in the late 1970s, N'Yoka Longo married Maguy Wanga Awaka in 1984. The couple had several children together. Although they separated in the early 1990s, they maintained an amicable relationship and continued to cooperate in raising their children. For a prolonged period thereafter, N'Yoka Longo did not remarry, focusing primarily on his musical career, leadership activities, and cultural engagements.

In August 2024, he married Nelly Mbiya.

== Discography ==
=== With Zaïko Langa Langa – as a participating member ===
- Non Stop Dancing (1974)
- Plaisir de l'Ouest Afrique (double album, 1976)
- Gitta Production présente le Tout-Choc Zaïko Langa-Langa (1981)
- Tout Choc (1982)
- Funky (double album, 1982)
- La Tout Neige, Christine & Nalali Mpongui (1983)
- L'Orchestre de tous les Âges (1983)
- Muvaro/Etape (1983)
- Zekete Zekete 2è Épisode (1983)
- On Gagne le Procès (1984, mixing assistant)
- En Europe (1984)
- Zaïko Eyi Nkisi (1985)
- Tala Modèle Echanger (1985)
- Eh Ngoss! Eh Ngoss! Eh Ngoss! (1986)
- Pusa Kuna... Serrez Serrez! (1986)
- Nippon Banzai (1986)
- Papa Omar (1987)
- Subissez les Conséquences (1987)
- Jetez l'Éponge (1989)
- Ici Ça Va... Fungola Motema (1990)
- Jamais Sans Nous (1991)
- Avis De Recherche (1995)
- Sans Issue (1996)
- Backline Lesson One (1997)
- Nous Y Sommes (1998)
- Poison (1999)
- Euréka ! (2002)
- Empreinte (2004)
- Rencontres (2007)
- Sève (2019)

=== Collaborative projects ===
- Bilombe Bakutani (1982, with Papa Wemba and Bimi Ombale)
