= Atalaku =

Vocal, instrumental and dance performer in Congolese rumba

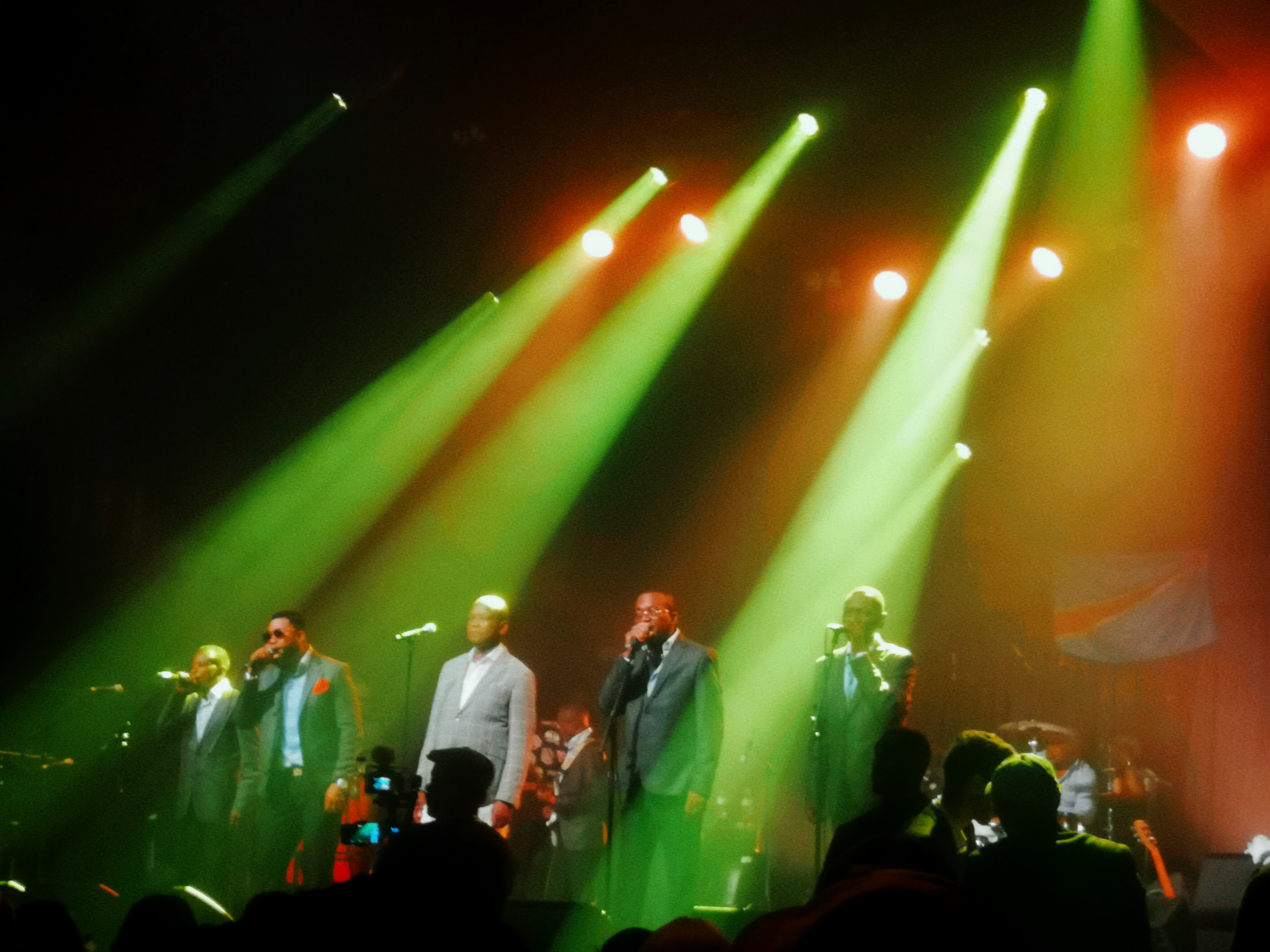
Zaïko Langa Langa played a significant role in introducing and popularizing the concept of atalaku in Congolese rumba

In the sebene instrumental section of a Congolese rumba song, the atalaku serves as the band's frontman, responsible for actively engaging the audience, building excitement, and augmenting the performance with spirited vocalizations and rhythmic chants. Atalaku often uses fast-paced speech, onomatopoeic sounds, and playful wordplay to captivate listeners and sustain their energy throughout the performance.

The atalaku rarely appears in music videos, and despite his widely recognized "song", he is not classified as a singer. Although he performs alongside prominent figures in the music industry, he is often overshadowed by his fellow band members. Criticism for his ostentatious stage presence and the perceived distortion of the nostalgic sentimentality of traditional Congolese rumba is common; nonetheless, he has emerged as an integral component of every Congolese dance sequence.

== Characteristics ==
=== Etymology and vocal prowess ===
The term atalaku derives from the Humbu expression "Ah tala ku!", meaning "look here" or "look at me". The cri was launched by Bébé Atalaku and Nono Monzuluku, during their appearance on the television programme Variété Samedi Soir performing as band members of Zaïko Langa Langa on 30 October 1982. They had previously used the cri while performing with the folkloric ensemble Bana Odéon. The broadcast helped popularize animation in Congolese music, and atalaku became the term used to describe both the performers and their role. In a 2024 interview, Bébé Atalaku recalled that children in the streets began calling him "Atalaku" and Nono "Zekete" after the broadcast. He replied with insults while Nono laughed.

During the sebene instrumental section of a song, the atalaku excels in vocal improvisation through a combination of shouts, melodies, and vocal pyrotechnics to excite the audience and prompt them to dance. Following the last lines of the chorus, the lead singer steps back, allowing the lead guitarist to initiate the sebene with an accelerated riff. The atalaku then takes center stage, wielding a microphone and maracas, to deliver a series of cris (shouts) and chants-cris (sung-shouts). They incorporate the names of singers, guitarists, and even audience members who have offered financial support, weaving these references into their shouts. This interactive element boosts the performers' morale and also personalizes the experience for the audience. These vocal elements are timed to synchronize with the fast-paced guitar and drum rhythms, which drive the musicians and the audience into a dancing frenzy.

=== Instrumental and dance skills ===
Beyond their vocal talents, the atalaku is also an instrumentalist and dancer. They play the spray can shaker, which amplifies the percussive rhythm of the snare drum. Their dynamic performance style often sees them joining the choreographed dance formations on stage, sometimes leading the front dance line or performing alongside female dancers. This diverse role requires incredible stamina, as the atalaku must maintain high energy levels throughout prolonged sebene, which can extend for several hours.

While the atalaku is often perceived as calling the dance steps and shouts, their actual control over these elements is limited. The succession of dance steps is influenced by various factors, making the atalaku's role during the sebene appear more prominent than it is. However, during extended dance solos, particularly those showcasing female dancers, the atalaku has greater freedom to choose their shouts. In these moments, they use suggestive language to frame the dancers' performances, mediating between social categories and reinforcing the dancers' roles as objects of male desire.

=== Language, authority, and tradition ===
The atalaku's shouts are often delivered in coded language, drawing from obscure expressions in local dialects such as Kikongo or Kiumbu, as well as urban slang. This arcane language introduces an element of intrigue to their performance, with the audience occasionally dancing to phrases they do not entirely comprehend. However, the atalaku's metaphoric and often lewd language is generally transparent to the audience, who are "in on the joke."

The atalaku's relationship with authority is complex, as they rely on sponsors for their livelihood. While they do not overtly oppose or resist authority, they use flattery and performance to gain the favor of the powerful, often luring money from wealthy patrons. Despite their role in modern dance music, the atalaku remains closely tied to traditional musical styles, drawing inspiration from funeral ceremonies (matanga) and other events. This practice, known as "dipping" (puiser), involves adapting traditional phrases, proverbs, or rhythms for use in contemporary performances.

== History ==
=== The folklore groups of Kintambo ===
The immediate background of the atalaku is the folklore ("urban traditional") music of Kintambo, Kinshasa. Social anthropology professor Bob W. White of the University of Montreal describes Kintambo as the "cradle" of this music and the birthplace of the atalaku.

Les 3 Z, an ensemble from Kintambo active from around 1974, was led by Sabu Nkosi Mutshatsha. Its vocalists included Ditutala Mbuesa, Miyalu Kayonda, nicknamed "Condamné", Kitolo and Nono Monzuluku, while its percussionists included Yaya Londa, Eugène Longi, Djerba Manzeku and Djuna Mumbafu, who was nicknamed "Petit Magicien" because of his young age. By the late 1970s, a split had given rise to two distinct movements: La Jeunesse, which included Mumbafu, and Bana Odéon, featuring Ditutala Mbuesa, Monzuluku, Bébé Mangituka and Manzeku. In 1980, Bana Odéon won the awards for Best New Group (Révélation de l'année) and Best Dance of the Year for "Zekete", rewarded by the ACMZA (Association des Journalistes Chroniqueurs de Musique du Zaïre).

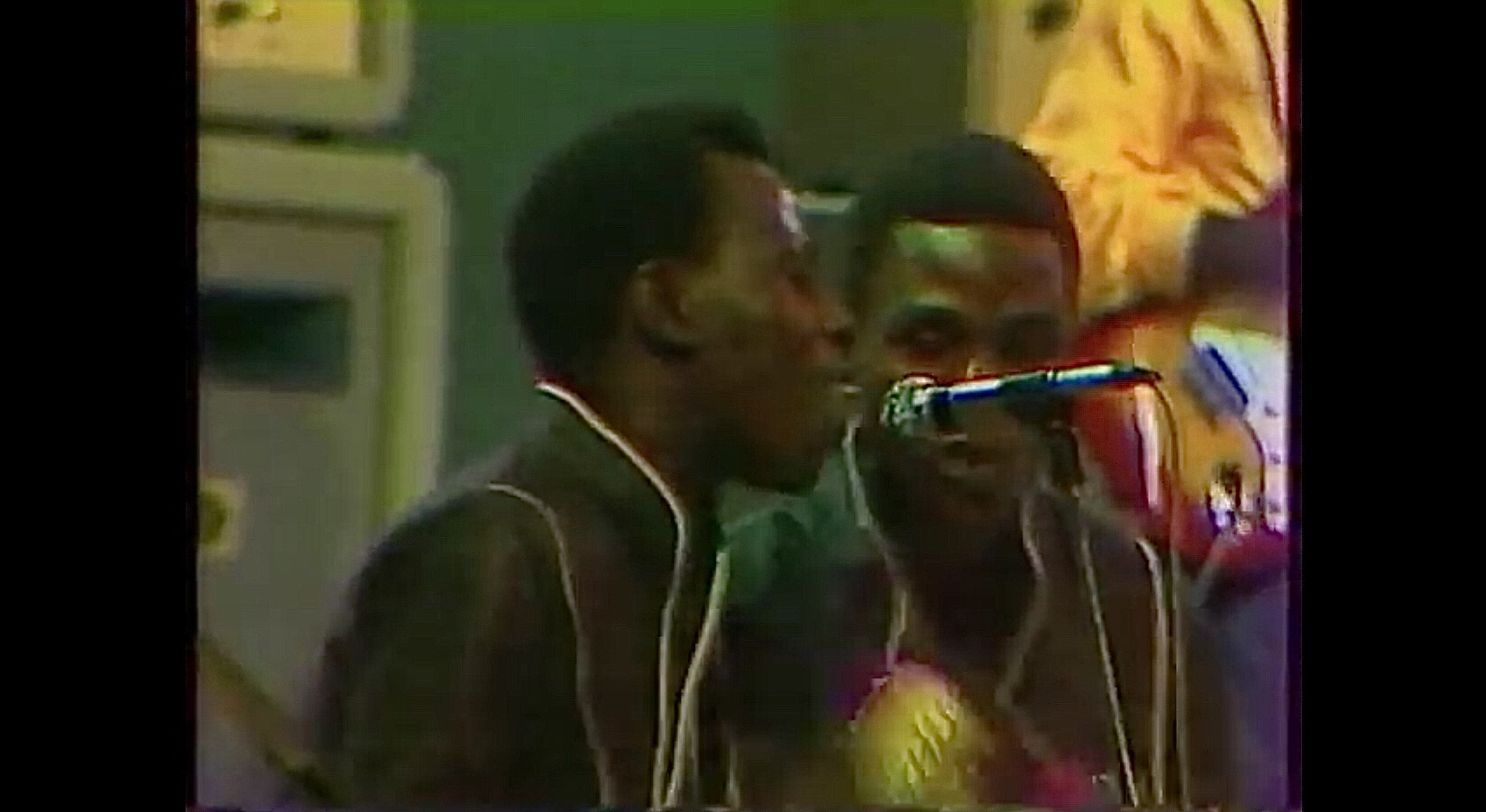
Bébé Atalaku and Nono Monzuluku performing with Zaïko Langa Langa on 30 October 1982.

=== Joining rumba bands ===
The folkloric groups of Kintambo attracted considerable interest from Zaïko Langa Langa. The band's singers Jossart N'Yoka Longo and Bimi Ombale frequently attended performances by Bana Odéon. In 1982, for Zaïko Langa Langa's Funky, recorded in Brussels, N'Yoka Longo incorporated chants inspired by Ditutala Mbuesa, who had performed with the band on a single occasion at Bar Mère Dou in Kintambo, the venue where Bana Odéon performed weekly.

White noted that Bana Odéon's growing visibility may have contributed to a member of Zaïko Langa Langa approaching its percussionist-singer Bébé Atalaku in August 1982. Bébé later recalled:

"The day that Sonnerie came to my house," remembers Bébé, "he said to me: 'Bébé, you have to come play with Zaïko. Dress nice and bring that marakas of yours'. I remember that day. They came to get Nono too, we started just playing marakas. We had our own microphones and I was so proud to play with such a big group. It was the biggest day of my life". (Bébé Atalaku, 3 February 1996)

Bébé and his Bana Odéon colleague Nono Monzuluku, along with Djerba Mandjeku, soon became permanent members of Zaïko Langa Langa, where their shouts and dances became trademarks of the band and helped establish the atalaku as a distinct role in Congolese popular music. Their first widely popularized shout, introduced in 1982, was the chant from which the public eventually derived the name atalaku:

"Ah, tala ku! Tala! Ah, tala ku mama! Zekete! Zebola ka zebola, zebola danse!" roughly translated as "Look at me! Look! Look at me, mama! Zekete! Zebola, zebola, the zebola dance!"

Zaïko Langa Langa's innovation initially received a mixed reaction. White noted that some musicians and fans, particularly those attached to the established tradition of modern rumba, regarded the incorporation of folklore as inappropriate for modern popular music, viewing it instead as music suited to ceremonial and ritual settings. Others, particularly younger listeners, welcomed the atalaku as a challenge to the dominance of established musical conventions. Bébé later recalled that critics initially dismissed the performers as merely shouting, but that their approach eventually earned respect: "The shouts we came up with were the rage in Kinshasa".

The popularity of Zaïko Langa Langa's shouts and dances, reflected in increased record sales and concert attendance, and prompted other bands to adopt the practice. In late 1983, Ditutala Mbuesa joined Choc Stars. In 1984, Gaby Yau-Yau joined Langa Langa Stars. The next year, Empire Bakuba recruited Djuna Mumbafu. Shouts and accompanying dances continually changed as musicians introduced new material, while popular innovations could spread rapidly between groups. Although bands generally incorporated borrowed shouts into their own repertoires, performers were expected to contribute original material of their own. The proliferation of atalaku was also influenced by the economic conditions of the 1990s. As the economic crisis reduced concert attendance and placed pressure on musicians to retain audiences, many bands incorporated established shouts and dances into their live repertoires.

=== Current trends ===
By the end of the 1980s, White noted that atalaku evolved from Zaïko Langa Langa's early innovation into a standard component of Congolese popular music. A new generation of performers developed distinctive personalities and techniques that helped transform animation from a supporting role into a major attraction in its own right. Zaïko's own animation team evolved following Bébé Atalaku's departure to the splinter band Zaïko Langa Langa Familia Dei. Doudou Adoula subsequently joined the group, with Nono Monzuluku helping him learn the role.

The rise of Wenge Musica and the subsequent development of its musical offshoots introduced new generations of atalaku. Performers associated with this period included Roberto Ekokota (Wenge Musica), Azanga (Big Stars) and Jean-Louis Manzungidi (Quartier Latin). Within Wenge Musica, Tutu Callugi was among the prominent animators associated with the development of the ndombolo phenomenon. His animation on JB Mpiana's album Feux de l'amour, released in 1997, helped popularize the term ndombolo and contributed to the dance's wider popularity. On the other side of the Congo River, in Brazzaville, Kila Mbongo, a founding member of Extra Musica, emerged as the first influential figure in the development of atalaku performance in the Republic of the Congo, although other animators had also debuted before or around this period. Extra Musica, formed in 1993, achieved wider recognition with its debut album, Les Nouveaux Missiles, released in 1995.

Koffi Olomide's Quartier Latin International developed its own succession of influential animators. Somono Dolce Parabolique and Mbochi Lipasa, who joined the orchestra respectively in 1995 and 1996, was one of its prominent figures during this period. Their duo helped shape the band's musical identity during the years leading up to the release of Loi, the 1997 album whose title track became closely associated with the international spread of the ndombolo dance. The two animators later became founding members of Quartier Latin Academia, formed in 1999 following the departure of several musicians from Koffi Olomide's ensemble. The following generation included CNN Alligator, who joined Quartier Latin in 1999. At the same time, Bill Clinton Kalonji and Celeo Scram became two of the most recognizable atalakus as band members of Wenge Musica Maison Mère, for their contrasting vocal approaches and improvised expressions.
