= Sebene =

Congolese rumba instrumental section

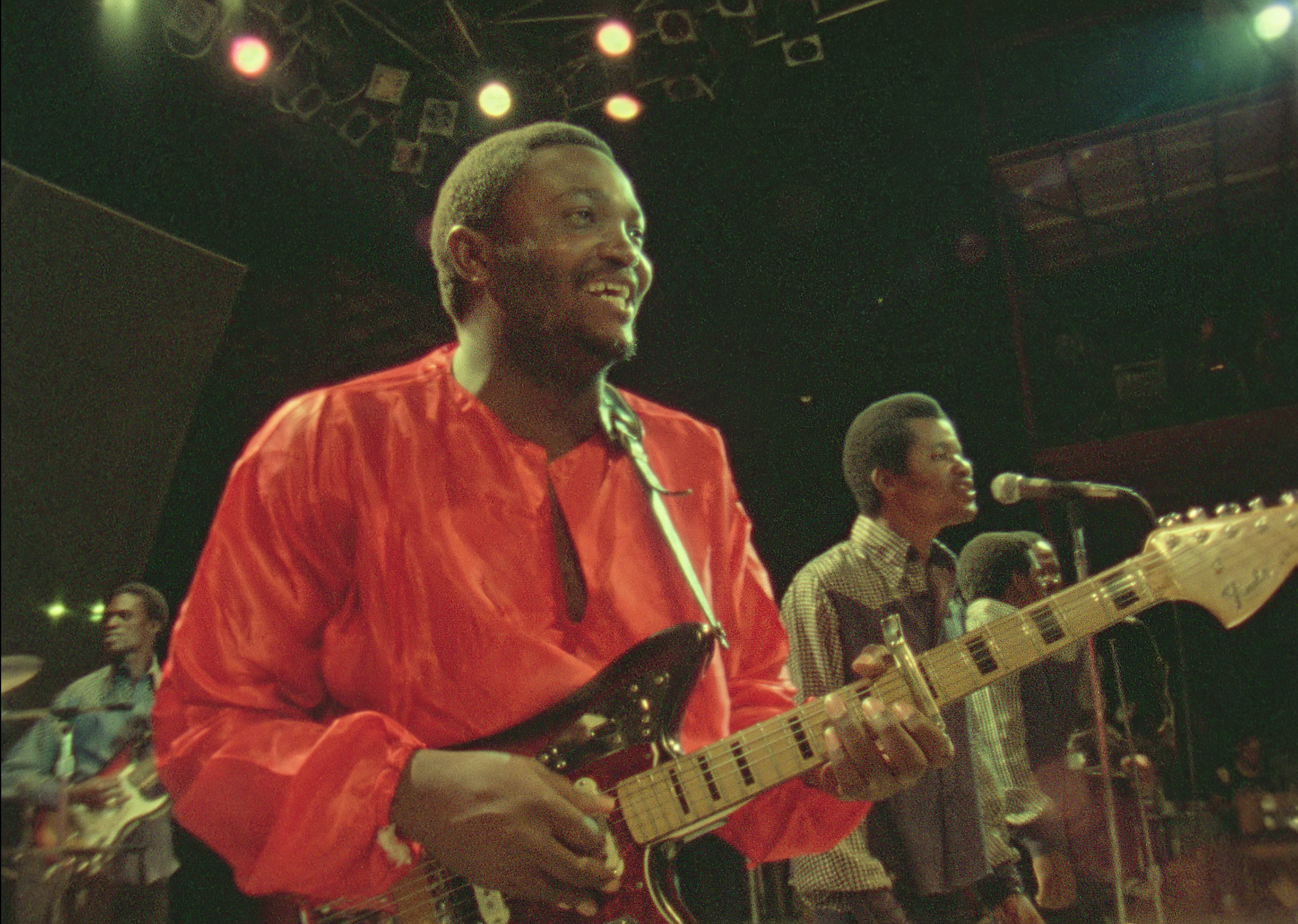
Franco Luambo is often credited for popularizing and revolutionizing sebene.

Sebene, also spelled seben, is an instrumental section commonly played in Congolese rumba. It is usually played towards the end of the song and is the dancing section where the lead and rhythm guitars take the lead in the dance. It is characterized by the repetition of a specific number of notes during the passage of second chords: a major chord and a seventh chord, which gives rise to the Lingala derivation "sebene", derived from the English numeral "seven" or its ordinal rendition.

Guitarists use a combination of lead and rhythm guitar to produce a distinct sound that is accompanied by vocalists, including an atalaku who energetically engages the audience and may call out to sponsors. The use of arpeggios, rapid chord changes, atalaku, and melodic embellishments is extensive in sebene and gives Congolese rumba a dynamic and energetic rhythm.

== Etymology ==
According to most Congolese musicologists, the term sebene was adapted from the English numeral seven. Although this attribution ostensibly ensues from folk etymology, it is believed that Congolese musicians assimilated this terminology from the palm-wine guitar tradition prevalent among West African migrants who resettled in Léopoldville (now Kinshasa) during the early 1900s and "whose music was interspersed with seventh chords ("seventh" → "seben")". While alternate descriptive designations (e.g., "chauffée", "saccadée", "animation", "partie dansante", "ambiance") are used to delineate this musical interlude, sebene stands as the oldest and pervasive terminology extensively preferred by musicians.

== Characteristics ==
During the instrumental section of sebene, the rhythmic section momentarily recedes, creating an open space for the proliferation of intricate, syncopated guitar refrains. As expounded in John Conteh-Morgan and Tejumola Olaniyan's "African Drama and Performance", after the ending of the last line of the chorus by singers, "the lead guitarist then kicks off the seben with a guitar rill that is slightly accelerated and is soon joined by the drummer's snare, the atalakus marakas (now acting as a rattle), and a random scream from somewhere off-mic".

According to musicologist and music professor Guy-Léon Fylla, in the key of C major, the successive notes would encompass:

- Fundamental chord: C, E, G
- Seventh chord: G
- Lower octave: F, G

This constitutes a dynamic and commanding musical interlude, allowing the solo guitar to conclude an improvisational passage before recommencing vocalization or facilitating the alternation for the expression of another instrument, customarily the brass (trumpets), the woodwinds (saxophones, clarinets), or keyboards, for which it then serves as a substratum for execution. The sebene also marks the beginning of the instrumental phase of a song, known as chauffer ("to heat up"), and serves as a prelude or conclusion to a guitar solo. It can also be fully instrumental, in which case it resembles a guitar riff or accompaniment.

The degree recurrently prevalent in a song is I, IV, V. There are five main cadences that characterize sebene:

- Demi-temps (half-time): Corresponding to the I – IV – I – V progression, this fast-moving sequence gives the sebene a snappy, upbeat feel and often works well when transitioning from singing into dance sections.
- Le 2 temps (two beats): Corresponding to the I – IV – V – IV progression, is more balanced, with the back-and-forth between the dominant (V) and subdominant (IV).
- Le 3 temps (three beats): Based on the I–V–IV–V progression, is a less symmetrical loop often used to create momentum and variation, with the return to V at the end adding a feeling of anticipation and drive.
- Le 4 temps (four beats): Corresponding to the I–VII–IV–V progression, is richer harmonically, with the inclusion of the VII degree (the "sensible") adding a tense flavor that makes the progression feel more expressive and unexpected.
- 7/7: Corresponding to the V–IV progression, is a looped vamp often used in long sebene jams, where the back-and-forth between the dominant and subdominant provides space for guitar solos (mi-solo and solo), or atalaku shouting to gradually build intensity.

The musical beat is delineated through a sequential count akin to a metronome, typically enumerating as 1, 2, 3, 4, and so forth. In the context of African music, chord changes, or degree shifts, typically occur every two or four pulses. Although old Congolese rumba pieces from the 1940s-1960s did not feature atalakus, the introduction of the atalaku in 1982, pioneered by Nono Monzuluku and Bébé Atalaku of Zaïko Langa Langa, emerged as a seminal innovation. Throughout the sebene, the atalakus' primary function is to galvanize people to dance, which they achieve through an amalgam of shouts, sung refrains, and vocal embellishments. In addition to vocal exhortations, the atalakus are instrumentalists and dancers, using a shaker to enhance the rhythmic pulse while also intermittently leaving the microphone to join the dance ensemble.

== History ==
The origin of sebene is a subject of contentious debate, with differing attributions and perspectives. Guy-Léon Fylla and Clément Ossinondé credit Antoine Kasongo Kitenge's orchestra with pioneering the style in 1947, while Congolese musicologist Audifax Bemba posits that guitarist Zacharie Élenga, known as Jhimmy L'hawaïenne, introduced sebene during his brief stint within Kasongo's orchestra. Conversely, British musicologist Gary Stewart contends that sebene made its debut appearance in Antoine Wendo Kolosoy's 1948 critically acclaimed hit "Marie-Louise", featuring a duet with Henri Bowane, wherein Wendo sings his affection for a woman confronting familial dissent. Bowane advises Wendo that his rhetoric is futile, and they should abscond with her to Kingabwa. Bowane then exclaims "Yoka sebene", segueing into a guitar solo. According to Stewart, this instance popularized the term "sebene" as a prolonged instrumental interlude.

Nonetheless, certain Congolese musicians propose an alternative origin, suggesting that sebene originated with Coastmen from West Africa who were resettled in Léopoldville by colonialists after the first surge of the Second World War, to work in the inaugural Dutch and Belgian factories. These Coastmen founded the Excelsior Orchestra in the port town of Boma on the north bank of the Congo River. This group was a replica of Accra's Excelsior and enlivened weekends with highlife songs in bars (often rudimentary or constructed from reeds) and on street corners, hosting traditional Kongo's maringa dance performances, with European instrumentation: guitar, saxophone, two-bell trumpet, chromatic accordion, and piano. Congolese guitarists enthusiastically incorporated the seventh chord into their solos, frequently signaling one another with exclamations of "seven", which evolved into the term "sebene".

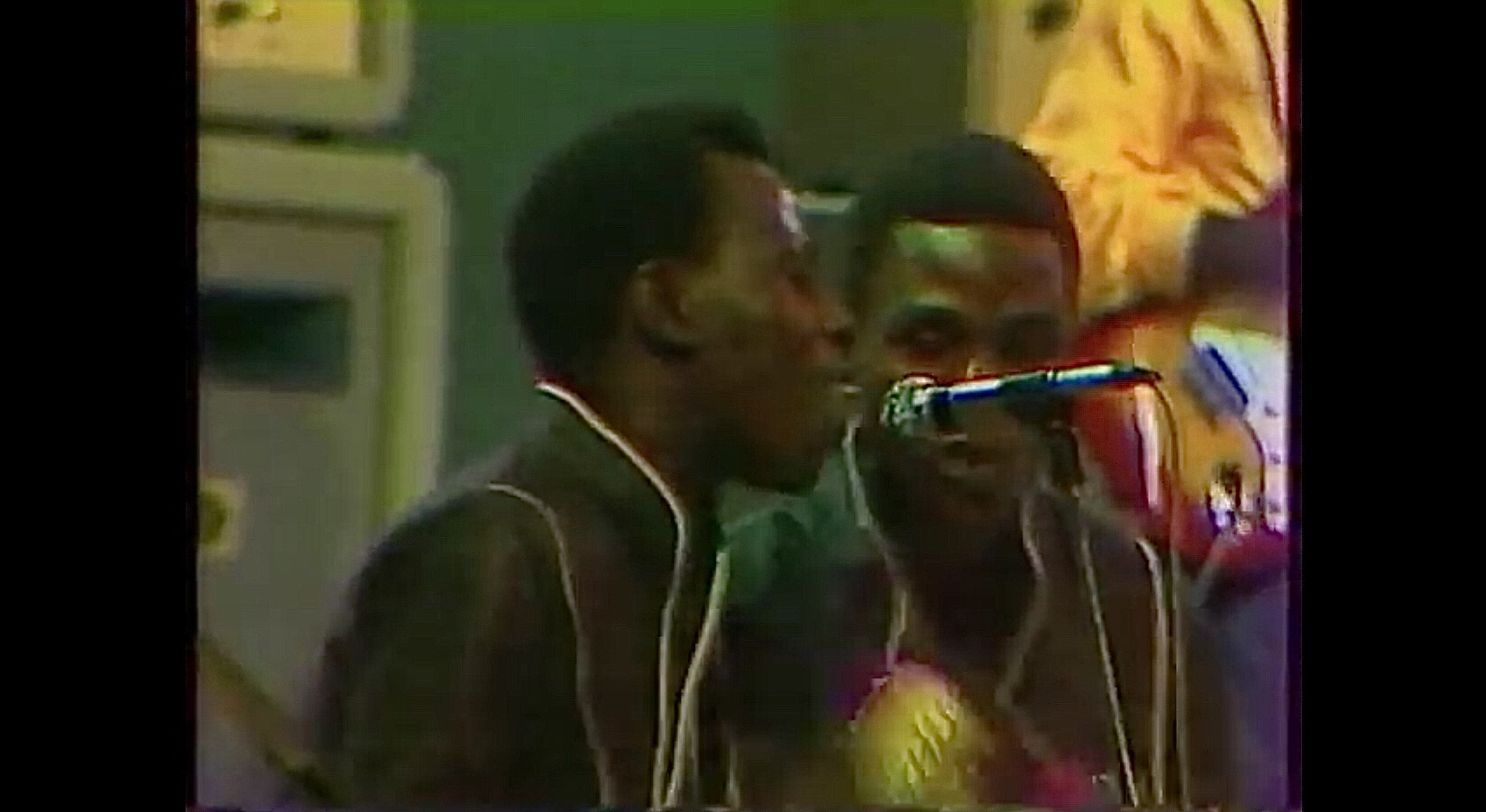
During their time with Zaïko Langa Langa, Bébé Atalaku and Nono Monzuluku co-pioneered atalaku.

Félix Manuaku Waku is also often cited as a pioneering figure in the development of sebene, although some trace its origins further back to transitional genres like the kebo, which the Congolese musicologist Clément Ossinondé observed was created by the group of the same name, known for its rhythmic sound, predominantly produced by patenge, a wooden frame drum held between the legs, with its tone adjusted by pressing the skin with the heel. Stewart states that the area where most dancing occurred was referred to as the sebene. One Lingala dictionary defines "sebene" as dance, though the exact point of its linguistic assimilation remains uncertain. Regardless of its provenance, sebene burgeoned in popularity during the 1950s, with Franco Luambo emerging as a leading practitioner, popularizing a primarily guitar-based sebene explicitly associated with physical release (défoulement).

Three essential elements converged to create a successful sebene: the cavacha rhythm, a distinctive lead guitar style, and the exclamations of the atalaku. While song sections may exhibit diverse rhythms and tempos, the cavacha rhythm, characterized by its onomatopoeic name, remains remarkably consistent across groups and time periods. Meridjo Belobi, the drummer of Zaïko Langa Langa, is credited with popularizing the cavacha rhythm, which is played primarily on the snare or hi-hats, lending a solid, driving feel to the rhythm.

The atalaku, whose name purportedly stems from the Kikongo expression for "look here, look at me", plays a crucial role in creating an atmosphere of excitement during sebene performances. Their improvisational prowess, combining shouts, melodies, and vocal pyrotechnics, aims to incite both the audience and fellow musicians to lose themselves in the music, despite their relative obscurity compared to other band members.
