= Bébé Atalaku =

Congolese musician (born 1962)

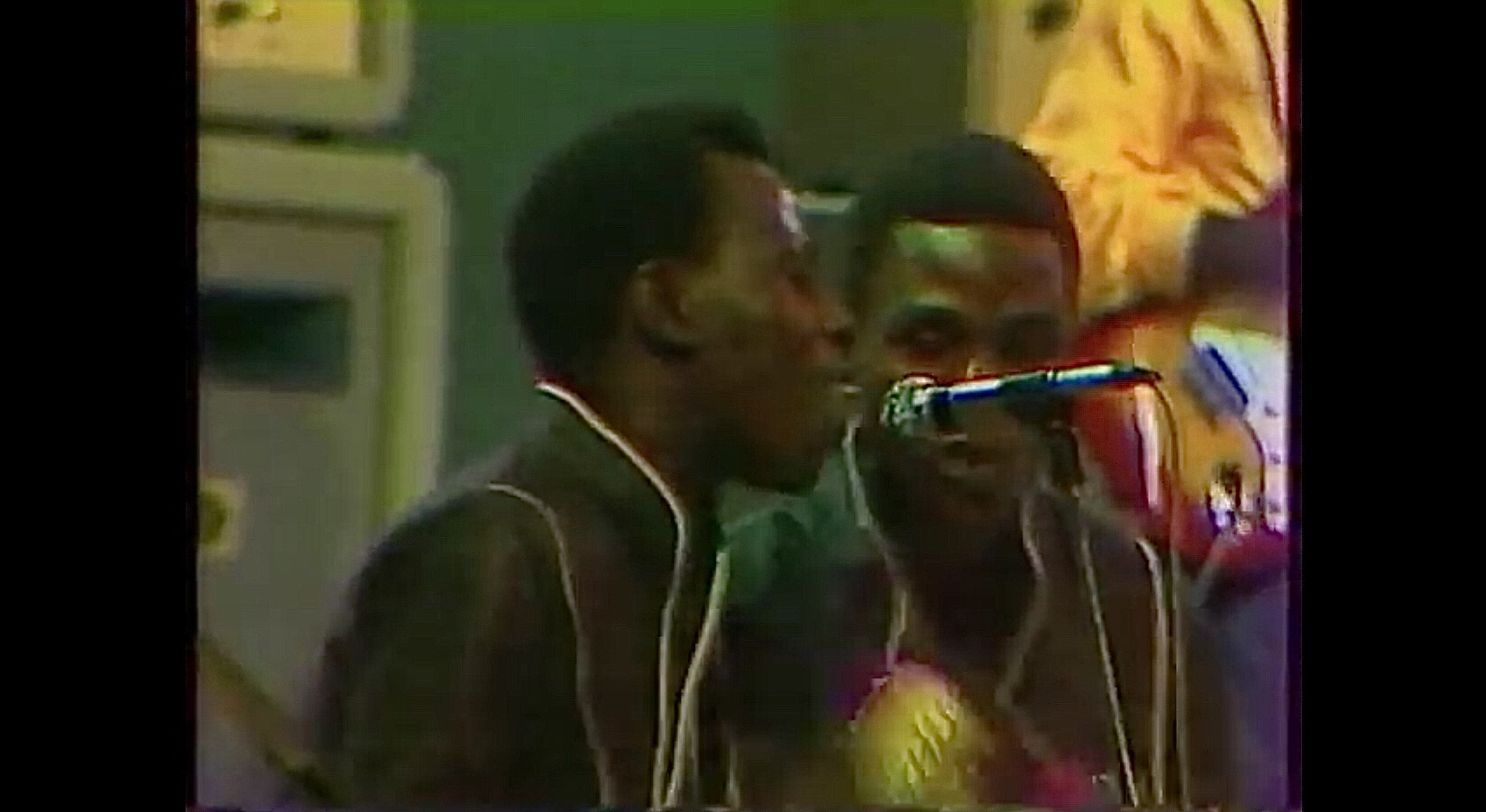
- Bébé Atalaku (left) with Nono Monzuluku in 1982

Background information
- Birth name: Faustin Mangituka Ntaminimo
- Born: July 7, 1962 (age 62); Léopoldville, Republic of the Congo (modern-day Kinshasa, Democratic Republic of the Congo)
- Genres: Congolese rumba; soukous
- Occupations: Atalaku; composer
- Years active: 1980–1995

Faustin Mangituka Ntaminimo (born 7 July 1962), known professionally as Bébé Atalaku, is a Congolese songwriter and musician whose work with Nono Monzuluku has significantly shaped Congolese music, mainly through his role as an atalaku in Zaïko Langa Langa.

== Life ==
Faustin Mangituka Ntaminimo was born on 7 July 1962 in Léopoldville (now Kinshasa), in what was then the Republic of the Congo (later known as Zaire, now the Democratic Republic of the Congo), to a family of Humbu ethnicity. His older brother is Ditutala Mbuesa. Both siblings were members of the folkloric group Bana Odéon, which was based in the Kintambo commune and included Nono Monzuluku and percussionist Djerba Manzeku.

In August 1982, Bébé became part of Zaïko Langa Langa alongside his colleague Djerba Manzeku. His entry into the band initiated the introduction of the atalaku role in the Congolese rumba section called sebene, a role he pioneered with Nono Monzuluku, who had joined Zaïko Langa Langa shortly before him. Atalaku, performers who sing and shout during dance segments in sebene to inspire and energize audience to dance, gained immense popularity across Africa, with nearly every band incorporating atalaku in their music.

Bébé toured Africa, Europe, the Americas, and Asia as part of Zaïko Langa Langa and contributed to several of the band's well-known albums, including Nippon Banzai (1986), Pusa Kuna… Serrez! Serrez! (1986), and Subissez les Conséquences (1987). He departed Zaïko Langa Langa in 1988 after one of the band's splits to join the offshoot Zaïko Langa Langa Familia Dei, where he performed until 1995.
