= Nono Monzuluku =

Congolese composer and musician (1960 – 2024)

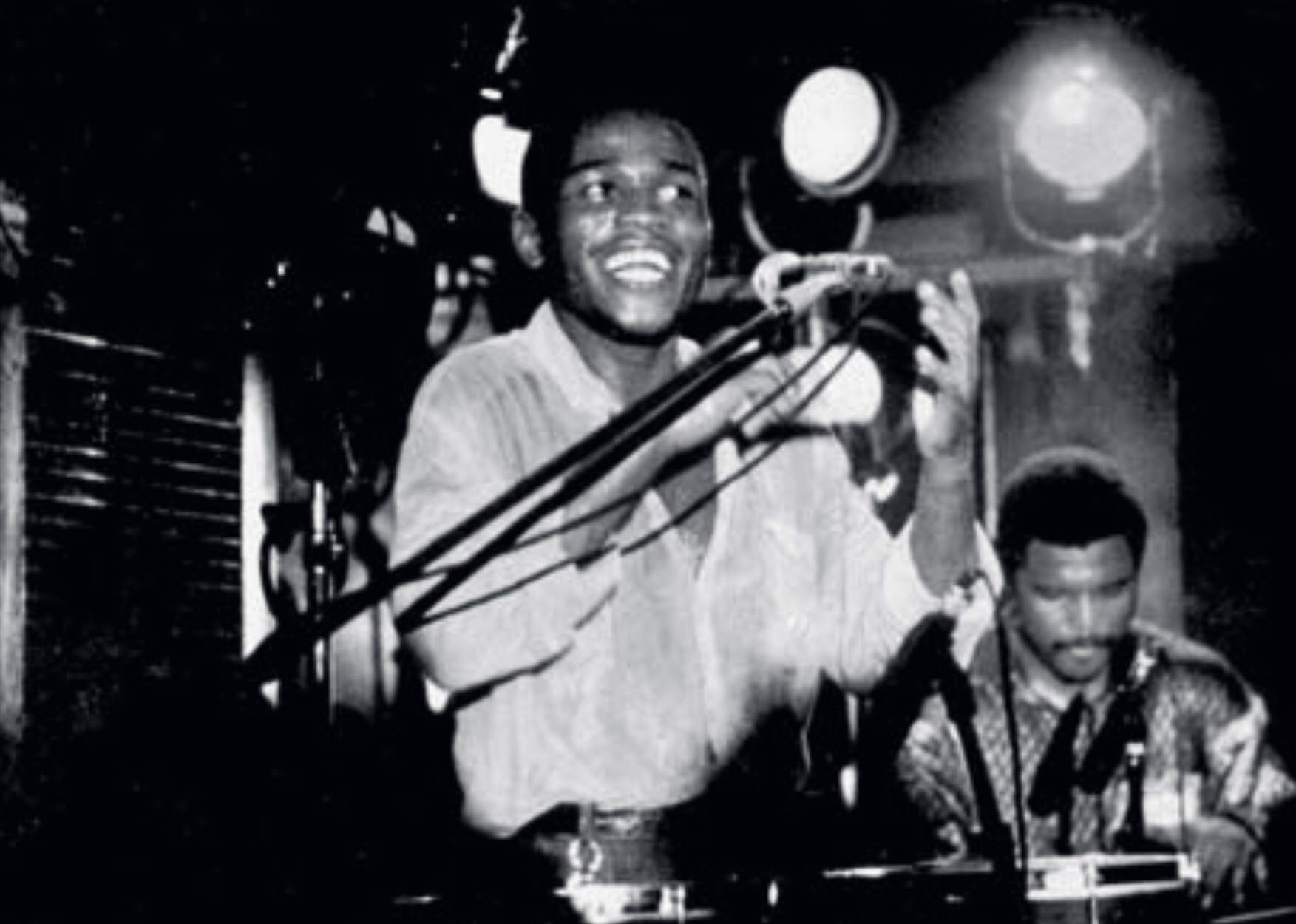

Background information
- Born: Honoré Monzuluku Mombele; January 1, 1960; Léopoldville, Belgian Congo (modern-day Kinshasa, Democratic Republic of the Congo)
- Origin: Democratic Republic of the Congo
- Died: January 10, 2024 (aged 64) Le Blanc-Mesnil, France
- Genres: Congolese rumba
- Occupations: Atalaku; composer; musician
- Instrument: Shaker
- Years active: 1982–2024
- Formerly of: Zaïko Langa Langa

Honoré Monzuluku Mombele (1 January 1960 – 10 January 2024) known professionally as Nono Monzuluku, was a Congolese composer and musician. He made significant contributions to Congolese music, particularly through his role as an atalaku in the influential band Zaïko Langa Langa.

== Early life and career ==
=== Early life, musical beginnings, and innovation ===
Honoré Monzuluku Mombele was born on 1 January 1960 in Léopoldville (now Kinshasa), in the Belgian Congo (now Democratic Republic of the Congo). He began his musical career as a member of the folk group Bana Odéon, alongside musicians including Ditutala Mbuesa, Bébé Atalaku, and percussionist Djerba Mandjeku. He gained widespread recognition after joining Zaïko Langa Langa, one of the most influential bands in African music history, in August 1982, alongside his colleagues Bébé Atalaku and Djerba Mandjeku.

Nono Monzuluku Mombele made history as the first atalaku in modern Congolese music, pioneering the role alongside Bébé Atalaku. Atalakus sing during the sebene section of a Congolese rumba song, providing energetic chants often imbued with significations or morals, while playing percussions such as shakers (before 1982, small animations were performed by the vocalists of a band). Mombele and his contemporaries introduced innovative chants and percussive elements during this section, adding depth and energy to Zaïko Langa Langa's performances.

=== Later career ===
Mombele's tenure with Zaïko Langa Langa spanned over three decades, during which he participated in numerous albums and toured all around the world. Notable albums featuring Mombele include Zekete Zekete 2e Episode, Nippon Banzai, Jetez l'éponge, and Avis de Recherche. He left the band in 2008 and then settled in Paris. Nono Monzuluku embarked on a solo venture in October 2021 with the release of his first and only single, "Mosisa", a 25-minute medley containing a big part of his animations. It is the longest "générique" recorded by a Congolese artist.

== Death ==
Nono Monzuluku died on January 10, 2024, in Le Blanc-Mesnil, France, due to previous health complications that caused hypertension. Three months later, his body was repatriated and buried in Kinshasa.

== Legacy ==
His contributions helped boost the popularity of the atalakus within Congolese bands (leading to the apparition of other atalakus such as Djuna Mumbafu, Roberto Ekokota, Bill Clinton Kalonji...) and also throughout Africa. A notable example is DJ Arafat in Ivory Coast, who gained wide recognition as an atalaku.
