= Félix Manuaku Waku =

Congolese musician (born 1954)

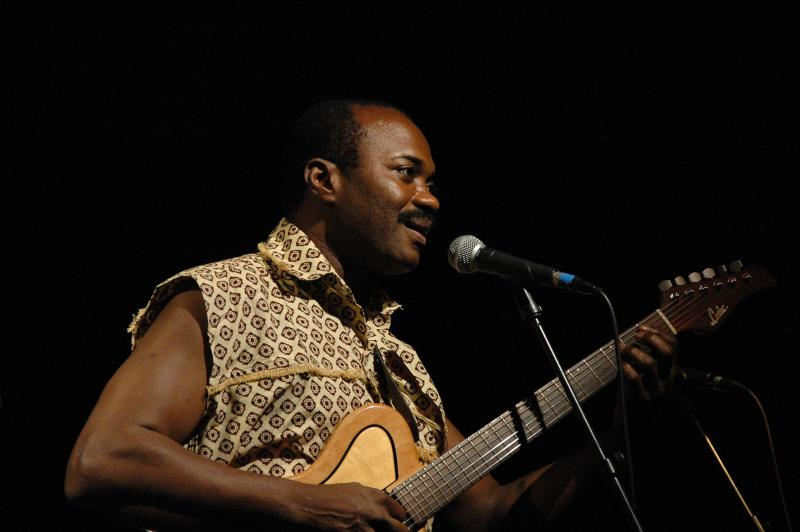
- Félix Manuaku Waku performing at Chorus, Lausanne.

Background information
- Also known as: Pépé Felly
- Born: Pedro-Feliz Manuaku; 19 August 1954 (age 72); M'banza-Kongo, Zaire Province, Angola
- Genres: Congolese rumba; World music
- Occupations: Guitarist; singer; songwriter; arranger; record producer; bandleader; lyricist
- Instrument: Guitar
- Years active: 1969–present

Félix Manuaku Waku (born 19 August 1954) is a Congolese guitarist, composer, singer, producer and bandleader. He is regarded as one of the most influential figures in Congolese rumba and modern African guitar playing. Also known under the name Pépé Felly, he was the first lead guitarist of Zaïko Langa Langa, where he introduced a radical shift in guitar technique and rhythm in the early 1970s. His percussive guitar style, departing from the melodic solos of earlier generations, contributed to the emergence of the third school of Congolese rumba, with his innovations shaping the sebene structure that became the hallmark of modern Congolese rumba and soukous.

He composed several of the band's breakout hits, including "Yudasi", "Obi", and "Femme Ne Pleure Pas", and was the first Congolese musician to play a double-neck guitar, as well as one of the earliest to incorporate distortion pedals and synthesizers into Congolese music. While serving in Zaire's national orchestra, he co-founded the band Les Ya Toupas with Ray Lema and Bopol Mansiamina. In 1980, after internal conflicts, he left Zaïko Langa Langa and founded Grand Zaïko Wawa, which became a hub for experimentation and helped launch the careers of artists such as Général Defao and Shimita El Diego. The band earned acclaim with hits "Molunge Na Ndako", "Sonia", and "Menace de Divorce".

After relocating to Switzerland in 1989, he pursued a solo career and engaged in international collaborations, including with American saxophonist Robin Kenyatta and reggae artist Jimmy Cliff. He later took part in the reunion project Le Quatre de Langa-Langa with Papa Wemba, Bozi Boziana, Evoloko Jocker, and Gina Efonge, and released the album Kongo Alchimie in 1996. In 2009, he opened Le Griot, a music school in Kinshasa, where he worked as an educator and mentor. In 2014, he founded New Zaïko and released Les grands classiques de la musique congolaise, containing reinterpretations of Congolese rumba. In 2018, he became musical director of the Elikya band. Manuaku has been noted for his contributions as a guitarist and mentor, and his work has been studied at institutions including the National Institute of Arts (INA) in Kinshasa and the University of Limerick in Ireland.

== Early life ==
Pedro-Feliz Manuaku was born in M'banza-Kongo, in the Zaire province (Angola) on August 19, 1954, to José Nicolas Bavinga and Tusamba Fineza. He was the second of twelve children. His grandfather, Manuel Mayungu d'Oliveira, was a guitarist and singer active in the 1950s, and his father also played guitar for leisure. At just seven months old, his family relocated permanently to Kinshasa. Growing up in a musically enriched environment, he was exposed early to icons such as Franco Luambo Makiadi and Docteur Nico. He was born with crooked fingers, which his mother massaged to straighten, an anatomical feature often cited as contributing to his distinctive guitar technique.

His passion for music began while watching his father play and later deepened when he attended a performance by OK Jazz. He eventually took lessons under the guidance of Ladji Milandu. In parallel, he studied drawing at the Académie des beaux arts in Kinshasa.

== Career ==
=== 1969–1980: Zaïko Langa Langa ===
His first organized musical experience came in his teenage years with the band Bel Guide National alongside Teddy Sukami, Enoch Zamuangana and Jossart N'Yoka Longo. On December 23, 1969, during a rehearsal of the band, he encountered Shungu Wembadio (later known as Papa Wemba), who sang his song "Désespoir Jules" while Manuaku accompanied him on guitar. The group soon disbanded to form a new band with Wemba's vocal presence. Manuaku and later N'Yoka Longo were both retained in the new ensemble. Zaïko Langa Langa was officially formed on December 24, 1969. Manuaku, just 15 years old, assumed the role of lead guitarist.

In March 1970, he participated in the band's first recordings, and began crafting a new stylistic language on guitar. Departing from the melodic sophistication of predecessors such as Franco, Docteur Nico and Gerry Gerard, his style emphasized rhythm, speed, and percussive patterns. Alongside with drummer Meridjo Belobi, who introduced the cavacha rhythm, and guitarists Oncle Bapius and Mbuta Matima, Manuaku Waku helped shape what musicologists term the "third school" of Congolese rumba. Their innovations modernized the genre and had a lasting impact across Central and East Africa.

From 1973 onward, he authored key compositions including "Mwana Mayi", "Conseil", "Lengela", and "Liziba". His work on tracks such as "Ngadiadia", "Ando", "Mbeya Mbeya", "Eluzam", "Chouchouna", and "Yudasi" showcased his range as a soloist. His inventive use of guitar solos and rhythmic breaks became the hallmark of Zaïko Langa Langa's sound. In 1974, internal discord followed, leading to the departure of key members Papa Wemba, Evoloko Jocker, Mavuela Somo and Bozi Boziana. The split stemmed from disputes over royalties and publishing structures. In response, Manuaku created Éditions Langa Langa, a collective rights management model. This contrasted with the individual contracts adopted by splinter faction Isifi Lokole.

Zaïko Langa Langa's 1976 LP Plaisir de l'Ouest Afrique included the track "Zaïko Wa Wa", an arrangement of a traditional song adapted by Manuaku. He increasingly pursued experimental projects, co-founding Les Ya Toupas with Ray Lema and Bopol Mansiamina to explore fusions between Congolese music and jazz, funk, and global sounds. In 1977, Manuaku was chosen for the Orchestre National du Zaïre, performing at FESTAC 77 alongside Tabu Ley Rochereau in Lagos.

He introduced the bouzouki to Congolese rumba, used distortion pedals, and was the first Zairian guitarist to use the double-neck guitar. His gear experiments included lending pedals to keyboardist Nzenze Mongengo, a precursor to the integration of synthesizers in the genre. His debut solo album Zaïko Wa Wa / Souci Mady (1978) and recordings including "Révélation" and "Ange Bokumba" illustrated his dual role as technician and innovator. In 1980, he penned two final hits for Zaïko: "Obi" and "Femme Ne Pleure Pas". Tensions grew in October of 1980 leading to his departure from the band.

=== 1981–1989: Grand Zaïko Wawa ===
Manuaku launched a new musical venture in late 1980: Grand Zaïko Wawa. The band released its debut single Bonganga under the label Editions Veve, owned by Verckys Kiamuangana. Subsequent albums like Molunge Na Ndako, Eke Ya Pamba and Santamaria showcasing the ensemble's interplay and Manuaku's continued innovations on guitar. During a reconfiguration of the band in 1981, Manuaku brought in fresh voices and talents such as Defao, Shimita, Djo Poster and guitarist Baroza Bansimba. The band scored several hits across Kinshasa and West Africa, and by 1984, their momentum peaked when they were named Best Orchestra of the Year by the Congolese Music Association (ACMZA).

In 1985, Manuaku participated in the collaboration Le Choc Choc 85, joining artists from the Clan Langa Langa such as King Kester Emeneya and Dindo Yogo. Two years later, in 1987, he collaborated with Jamaican reggae star Jimmy Cliff during the latter's visit to Kinshasa. Despite these highlights, internal rivalries, member defections, and the broader fragmentation of the Congolese music industry strained Grand Zaïko Wawa's cohesion. A West African tour and the release of the hit album Menace de Divorce sustained interest, but ultimately could not prevent the group's dissolution.

By 1989, Manuaku decided to disband Grand Zaïko Wawa. He relocated to Switzerland, where he turned toward pedagogy and jazz experimentation. There, he collaborated with American saxophonist Robin Kenyatta at the Lausanne Jazz School and continued producing music under the Grand Zaïko name, albeit with a more intimate, studio-oriented approach.

=== 1990–2000: Solo works and comeback ===
In 1995, he returned by collaborating in Papa Wemba's studio album Pole Position, contributing on the track "Soul Gbemani". A year later, he released a solo album, Kongo Alchimie (1996), a project featuring vocalists Gina wa Gina, Djuna Djanana, and guitarist Jagger, which included reworks of hits including "Yudasi". In the early 2000s, he joined the supergroup Le Quatro Langa Langa alongside Wemba, Evoloko Jocker, Bozi Boziana and Gina Efonge.

=== 2006–present: Musical education ===
In 2006, Dom Pedro directed a documentary on his life and career. Driven by a desire to pass on his knowledge, Manuaku launched the Le Griot music school in Kinshasa in 2009, focusing on guitar instruction, arrangement, and music theory. Although the school was looted in 2010 during political unrest, Manuaku re-established his teaching activities in Europe. He became music director of the choir Elikya in 2018 and organized events marking 50 years of his career in Kinshasa, Paris, and Brussels.

== Legacy ==
Félix Manuaku Waku is considered one of the architects of the contemporary Congolese guitar idiom and a key figure of Central African music. His rhythmic innovations, use of technology, and commitment to artistic integrity have left a lasting imprint. He is widely regarded as a founding father of the modern sebene style, and his influence is evident in the work of guitarists like Alain Makaba and Flamme Kapaya.

Above all, Manuaku is credited with being a founding figure of the "third school" of Congolese rumba. Following the first wave of African Jazz and OK Jazz, and the second wave of bands like African Fiesta and Dr. Nico's African Fiesta Sukisa, the third school, led by Zaïko Langa Langa, broke away from Latin harmonies and horn-led arrangements. Manuaku's role was crucial: his rapid-fire, melodic sebene breaks, stripped-down arrangements, and guitar-centric compositions opened a new path for modern Congolese music.

By placing the solo guitar at the center of rhythmic propulsion and melodic invention, he carved a space for future generations of soloists to emerge. His technical vocabulary became a blueprint for dozens of bands across Congo, Kenya, Uganda, Tanzania, and beyond.

== Discography ==
=== Studio albums ===
- Kongo Alchimie (1996)
- Les grands classiques de la musique congolaise (2014)

==== With Zaïko Langa Langa ====
The following list includes studio albums only. Pépé Felly has recorded more than 70 singles as a member of Zaïko Langa Langa.

- Non Stop Dancing (1974)
- Plaisir de l'Ouest Afrique (1976)

==== With Grand Zaïko Wawa ====
- Le Maître Manuaku Waku Et Le Grand Zaiko Wawa (1980)
- Eke Ya Pamba (1983)
- Santamaria (1984)
- Mindondo / 15 (1984)
- Mwasi Ya Solo (1985)
- Wapi Consolation / Abulungani (1985)
- Drapeau Blanc (1986)
- Pole Pole (1986)
- Liteya (1986)
- Krishna (1987)
- Menace De Divorce (1987)
- Jalousie Abat (1988)
- Expérience 9 (1989)
