= Bimi Ombale =

Bimi Ombale (21 July 1952 – 29 April 2011, born Andre Bimi Ombale, also known as Andre Bimi, Bimi Ombale, Mwana Wabi) was a Congolese singer, drummer and songwriter. He was a member of the band Zaiko Langa Langa from 1969 to 1988 and its most successful and prolific songwriter.

== Musical history ==
=== 1968-9: Early years ===
Ombale was a drummer for the rhythm and blues and pop band Zezes (1968–1969).

=== 1969-80: Zaiko Langa Langa ===
Ombale joined Zaiko in 1969, two days before the band first public performance. He was brought in by Vieux Otis, a friend of the founding members as a drummer for the pop section of the group.

After two years in the band Ombale decided to shift both role and genre, changing from drumming to singing and pop music to Soukous. Zaiko's then-singers Jossart Nyoka Longo, Jules Shungu Wembadio, Anto Evoloko Atshuamo and Simeon Mavuela Somo opposed Omabale singing in the band, ultimately causing him to leave the band. In 1971 he joined his musical idol Tonny Dee in the band Tabou National. Shortly after Tabou National began performing, Zaiko member DV Muanda asked Ombale to rejoin the band. Ombale would only remain in Tabou National for a few more months before returning fully to Zaiko.

While Ombale was back in Zaiko, tensions still existed between him and the singers, who considered him difficult to work with . Ombale then shifted his focus to songwriting. Bimi Ombale's first song "Joliba" was recorded in 1971, and received favorable review and heavy airplay. In 1972 he released "Jose-Lina" and "Mwanza" to mixed reviews . However, this year Zaiko also broke into the mainstream with the song "Consolation" off Efonge Gina, which was awarded best song of the year. By 1973, Zaiko was a successful band on the music charts and revolutionizing the youth music with rhythm Cavacha. Bimi Ombale's song "Zena" was one of the biggest releases of the year.

In 1974, Anto Evoloko became the frontman of the band. However, Bimi Ombale and fellow member Jossart Nyoka were given less space to perform. The two began rehearsing at Bimi Ombale family home. The result of their collaboration were the acclaimed songs "Mwana Wabi", "Mizou" and "Mbelengo".

Rising tensions in Zaiko between the frontman and the instrumentalists led to their decision in 1975 to oust Evoloko and the singers in favour of Ombalie and Nyoka. Ombale became the creative heart of Zaiko, writing numerous songs and fronting the band in Nyoka Longo. Zaiko continued their success, and many of the former singers returned to the band. However, a developing rivalry between Ombale and singer Mashakado Mbuta over band leadership came to a head at the end of the year during a live performance on Zairian national television. The two singers fought on air for the microphone and refused to sing and dance at each other songs. Mashakado Mbuta left the band in 1976 to join Yoka Lokole. Un his three years as a singer in Zaiko "Bimi" will write seven songs, third most prolific writer after "Anti Evoloko" and "Jules Shungu" who both have been singers for five years.

With a stable lineup, Ombale entered an artistically fruitful era, as Zaiko released songs of his including "Ima", "Likamuisi", "Aziza", "Moni Amina", "Amitie", "Lolita", "Misolina", "Cherie b wabi", "Kinshasa makambo, " diakina", "didina", "youyou" and many more. In five years Bimi Ombale will write over fifteen songs.

=== 1980-8: Tout choc Anti choc Zaiko Langa Langa ===
At the beginning of 1980, worried that the large number of musicians meant that the band was losing cohesion, Ombale, Nyoka Longo, Teddy Sukami and DV Muanda decided to suspend all the singers and requested all to reapply for their position. During the changes, founding members Pepe Manuaku and Teddy Sukami also left. To prove they could survive the change, the band was now called Tout choc Anti choc Zaiko Langa Langa. Ombale's hits from the streamlined lineup included "La blonde and "baby". Other Ombale songs released included "Mopaya zoba", "Baby", "Elima ngando", "Sandralina", "Fanny moke", and "Nibe ya bomwana". Bimi Ombale will release part of thé trio " NYOBIWE" which was a "Bimi Tombale", " Nyoka Longo" and "Papa Wemba" thé hits "Mimi la Rwandaise" and "Andy Loli". The band also toured Europe and Asia. Again " Bimi" is by far the most prolific songwriter of this era with eight songs in seven years while the band average was three songs. "Bimi Ombale" will cement his place as the one man songs factory of Zaiko Langa Langa and all-time most prolific songs writer in the history of Zaiko with over 30 songs in 18 years.

=== 1988-91: Split and Zaiko Familia Dei ===
In 1988, Zaiko Langa Langa split into the two groups Zaiko Langa Langa Nkolo Mboka and Zaiko Langa Langa Familia Dei. Bimi Ombale led the latter.

Bimi Ombale led the dissident fraction of Zaiko Langa Langa called Zaiko Familai Dei, from 1988 to 1991. A leadership quarrel between him and his co-leader Ilo Pablo, forced him to leave the band in 1991.

=== 1991-5: Basilique Loningisa Mwana Wabi ===
In 1991, Bimi Ombale created his own band Basilique Loningisa. He requested the support of Karlito Lassa, a member of the successful Congolese band, Choc Stars. Karlito performed in Basilique Loningisa as a guest and featured in all songs and albums released by the band. The band split in 1995.

=== 1995-2011: Frere Andre ===
In 1995, Bimi Ombale converted to Christianity. He preferred to be known as Frere Andre. He wrote and sang gospel music from this point on until his death in April 2011.
