= Gerry Dialungana =

- Also known as: Gerry
- Born: Kassia Dialungana; 1 January 1951; Kinshasa, Democratic Republic of the Congo
- Died: 2 February 2002 (aged 51)
- Genres: TPOK Jazz, Les Malous, Les Grand Maquisards
- Occupations: Composer, arranger, guitarist
- Instrument: Guitar
- Years active: 1970–2002

Gerry Kassia Dialungana (1 January 1951 – 2 February 2002), was a Congo music recording artist and solo guitarist, in the Democratic Republic of the Congo (DRC). He was once a member of the soukous band TPOK Jazz, led by François Luambo Makiadi, which dominated the Congolese music scene from the 1950s through the 1980s.

== History ==
He was born in Leopoldville, now Kinshasa, DRC, in 1951. During his youth, he was an admirer of Tabu Ley Rochereau's singing voice. Gerry Dialungana taught himself guitar by mimicking Docteur Nico. "I didn't choose to be a musician," he says, "it just happened." After playing locally with several amateur groups, he made his professional debut with Les Malous, in 1970. In 1973 he joined Les Grand Maquisards, where Dalienst was a member. In 1976, he joined TPOK Jazz, where he became a member of the band's directional committee. The committee was composed of band members and was responsible for general operations, social functions, equipment, rehearsal schedules, and discipline.

== Discography ==
Gerry Dialungana is credited with the composition of the following recorded titles:

- Tembe Luntandila - with TPOK Jazz
- Kufwa Ntangu - with TPOK Jazz
- Mukungu - With TPOK Jazz
- Kuna Okeyi Obongisa
- Hommage a Franco - by Gerry Dialungana & Mantuika

== See also ==
- Franco Luambo Makiadi
- Sam Mangwana
- Josky Kiambukuta
- Simaro Lutumba
- Ndombe Opetum
- Youlou Mabiala
- Mose Fan Fan
- Wuta Mayi
- TPOK Jazz
- List of African musicians
