= Mpundi Decca =

- Citizenship: Democratic Republic of the Congo
- Occupation: Musician

Mpudi Decca was a Congo music recording artist and bass guitarist in the Democratic Republic of the Congo (DRC). He was once a member of the Congo music band TPOK Jazz, led by François Luambo Makiadi, which dominated the Congolese music scene from the 1950s through the 1980s.

== See also ==
- Franco Luambo Makiadi
- Sam Mangwana
- Josky Kiambukuta
- Simaro Lutumba
- Ndombe Opetum
- Youlou Mabiala
- Mose Fan Fan
- Wuta Mayi
- TPOK Jazz
- List of African musicians
