= Isaac Musekiwa =

Congolese soukous musician

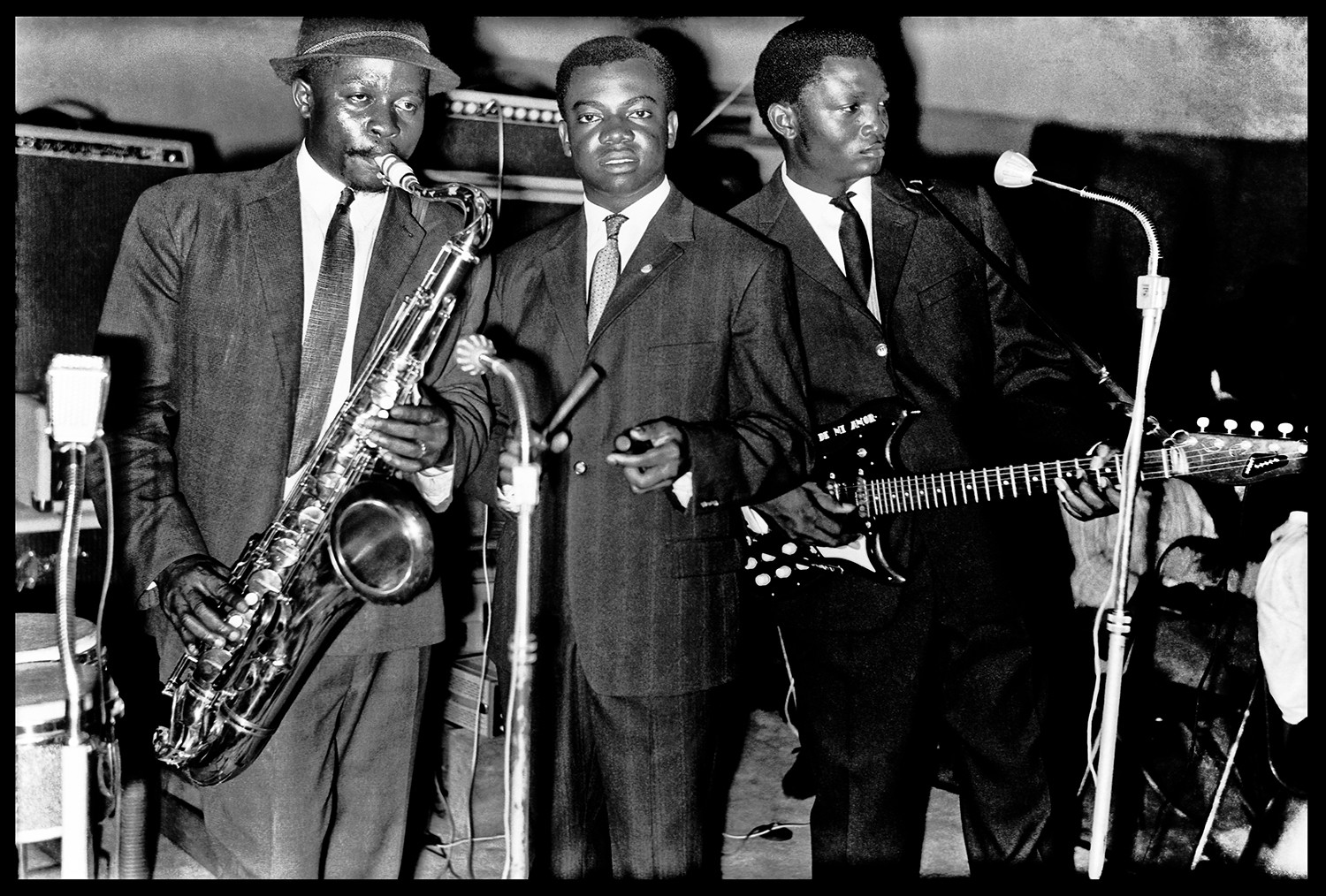
Isaac Musekiwa (left), Franco Luambo (right), and Joseph "Mujos" Mulama (center) in Léopoldville, ca. 1963

Isaac Musekiwa (c. 1930 – 1991) was a Congolese rumba recording artist and saxophonist, in the Democratic Republic of the Congo (DRC). He was once a member of the soukous band TPOK Jazz, led by François Luambo Makiadi, which dominated the Congolese music scene from the 1950s through the 1980s.

== Overview ==
Musekiwa was born and grew up in Southern Rhodesia (now Zimbabwe), before he migrated to Congo-Kinshasa. He became good friends with Franco and is one of those who constantly played with him all those years.

Musekiwa died in 1991.

== See also ==
- Franco Luambo Makiadi
- Sam Mangwana
- Josky Kiambukuta
- Simaro Lutumba
- Ndombe Opetum
- Youlou Mabiala
- Mose Fan Fan
- Wuta Mayi
- TPOK Jazz
- List of African musicians
