= Rondot Kassongo =

Rondot Kassongo, is a soukous recording artist and saxophonist, in the Democratic Republic of the Congo (DRC). He was once a member of the soukous band TPOK Jazz, led by François Luambo Makiadi, which dominated the Congolese music scene from the 1950s through the 1980s.

== See also ==
- Franco Luambo
- Sam Mangwana
- Josky Kiambukuta
- Simaro Lutumba
- Ndombe Opetum
- Youlou Mabiala
- Mose Se Sengo
- Wuta Mayi
- TPOK Jazz
- List of African musicians
