= Saturnin Pandi =

Saturnin Pandi (1932–1996) was a soukous recording artist, conga player, in the Republic of the Congo (Congo-Brazzaville) and in the Democratic Republic of the Congo (DRC). He was one of the founding members of the soukous band TPOK Jazz, formed in 1956, led by François Luambo Makiadi, which dominated the Congolese music scene from the 1950s through the 1980s. He was also a member of the Bantous de la Capitale, formed, in Brazzaville in 1959, led by Jean Serge Essous.

== See also ==
- Franco Luambo Makiadi
- Sam Mangwana
- Josky Kiambukuta
- Simaro Lutumba
- Ndombe Opetum
- Youlou Mabiala
- Mose Fan Fan
- Wuta Mayi
- TPOK Jazz
- List of African musicians
