= Aime Kiwakana =

- Citizenship: Democratic Republic of the Congo
- Occupation: Singer

Aime Kiwakana Kiala, born Emmanuel Kiala (died 1992), was a soukous recording artist, composer and vocalist, in the Democratic Republic of the Congo (DRC). He was once a member of the soukous band TPOK Jazz, led by Franco Luambo, which dominated the Congolese music scene from the 1950s through the 1980s.

== See also ==
- Franco Luambo
- Sam Mangwana
- Josky Kiambukuta
- Simaro Lutumba
- Ndombe Opetum
- Youlou Mabiala
- Mose Fan Fan
- Wuta Mayi
- TPOK Jazz
- List of African musicians
