= Philippe Lando Rossignol =

Philippe Lando Rossignol, was a soukous recording artist and vocalist, in the Democratic Republic of the Congo (DRC). He was once a member of the soukous band TPOK Jazz, led by François Luambo Makiadi, which dominated the Congolese music scene from the 1950s through the 1980s. Rossignol was one of the founding members of the group in 1956. He quit the band in 1957. Rossignol died on 24 June 2004.

== See also ==
- Franco Luambo Makiadi
- Sam Mangwana
- Josky Kiambukuta
- Simaro Lutumba
- Ndombe Opetum
- Youlou Mabiala
- Mose Fan Fan
- Koffi Olomide
- Wuta Mayi
- TPOK Jazz
- List of African musicians
