= Bavon Marie-Marie =

Congolese guitarist (1944–1970)

Bavon Marie Marie
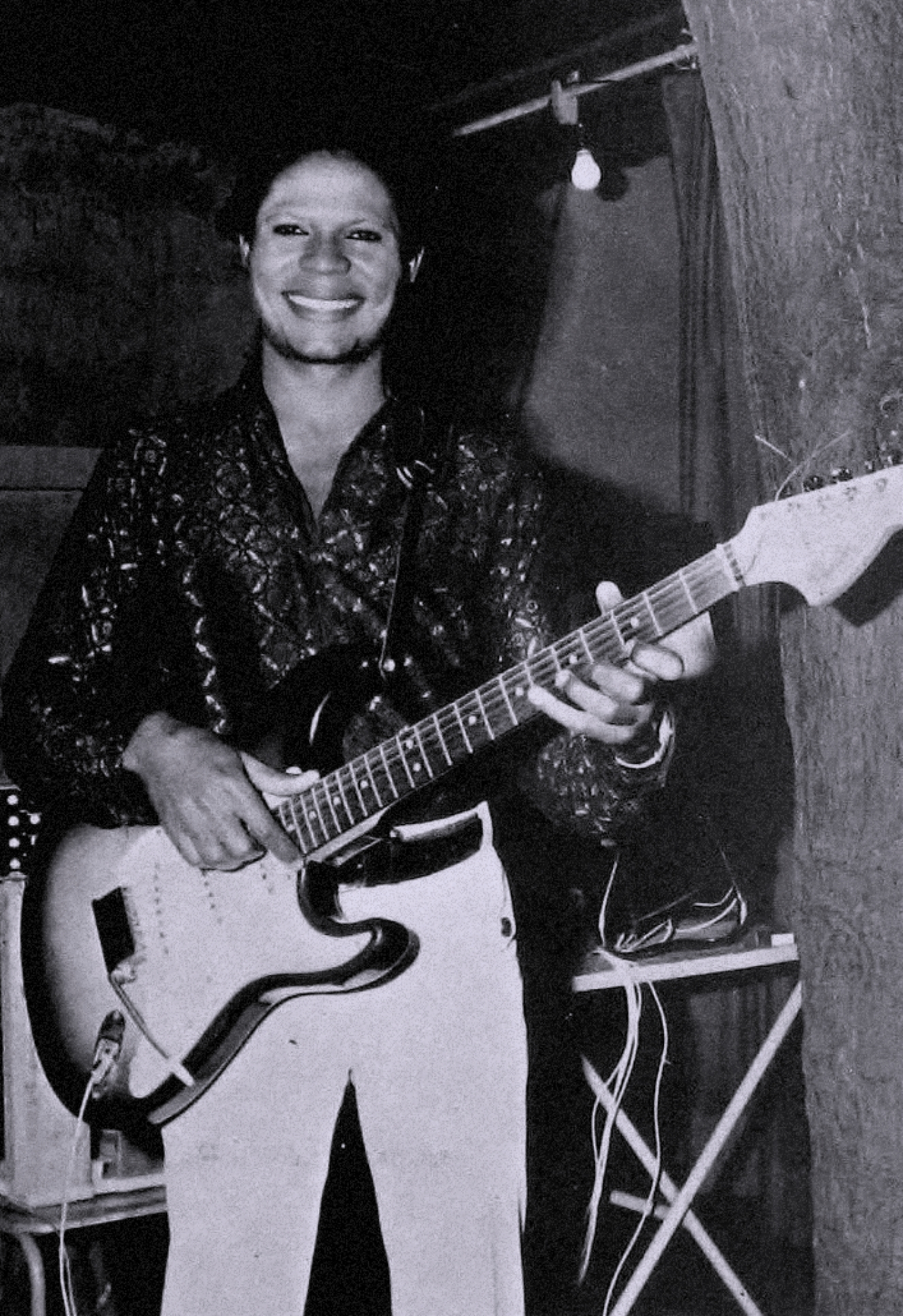

Background information
- Born: 27 May 1944; Léopoldville, Belgian Congo (now Kinshasa, DRC)
- Died: 5 August 1970 (aged 26) Kinshasa, Democratic Republic of the Congo
- Genres: Congolese rumba
- Occupations: Guitarist; songwriter
- Instrument: Guitar
- Years active: 1961–1970
- Labels: Epanza Makita; Boma Bango; Tcheza; Ngoma; SonoDisc
- Formerly of: Orchestre Jamel; Les Cousins Bleus; Les Barons du Jazz; Cubana Jazz; Orchestre Cobantou

Bavon Siongo Luambo (27 May 1944 – 5 August 1970), known professionally as Bavon Marie-Marie, was a Congolese guitarist and songwriter. He was a prominent figure in the Kinshasa music scene during the 1960s, best known as the younger brother of Franco Luambo. Despite his short life, he achieved significant popularity through the band Négro Succès.

Before finding his permanent home, Bavon cycled through several ensembles including Les Barons du Jazz, Les Cousins Bleus, which he founded himself in Boma in 1961, Orchestre Cubana Jazz, Orchestre Jamel Jazz and briefly Orchestre Cobantou de Dewayon, where he worked alongside guitarist Papa Noël Nedule. Each formation honed his technique, deepening his command of the odemba style and the rumba idiom he had absorbed from Franco's playing. When Bholen Bombolo returned from Europe in 1964 and sought Franco's help to resurrect Orchestre Négro Succès, which he accepted and made Bavon join. On 15 December 1964, the reconstituted band played its first gig at the Vis-à-Vis club in Matonge, with Franco providing his brother both a guitar and an amplifier.

From 1965 onwards, Bavon and Bholen turned Négro Succès into one of the most popular bands in Kinshasa. Bavon's guitar style, uptempo and funky, laced with rock-inflected riffs and occasional 6/8 passages, thrilled a younger generation. A string of hits followed: "Lucie Tozongana", "Yalimbisa Bijou", "Libanga Na Libumu", "Maseke Ya Meme", which sent the band to the top of the charts. Bavon Marie-Marie died on 5 August 1970 at the age of 26 in a car crash in Kinshasa.

== Life and career ==
=== 1944–early 1960s: Early life, education, and career beginnings ===
Bavon Siongo Luambo was born on 27 May 1944 in Kinshasa, then Léopoldville in the Belgian Congo, to Yvon Emongo and Hélène Mbonga Makiese. After his father's death, he was raised by his mother in the "Far West" neighborhood, an area that now forms part of the Ngiri-Ngiri commune. He was the younger brother of François Luambo Luanzo Makiadi, later known as Franco, who was born six years earlier.

Bavon attended his primary schooling at the Catholic school of Saint Louis in the Kasa-Vubu commune of Kinshasa, before completing his studies at Mbanza-Mboma in the Bas-Congo province. Hoping to spare him the rough-and-tumble life of a working musician, a profession viewed with considerable social suspicion at the time, Franco sent him to study in Bas-Congo. Despite this, Bavon remained interested in music and secretly learned to play the guitar under the guidance of José Kayenge.

By then, Franco had already established himself as a studio guitarist at the Loningisa record label, having joined the company in 1953 at the age of fifteen. Aware of the financial difficulties and social stigma often associated with a musical career, he wanted Bavon to continue his studies and ideally pursue a profession such as medicine to became a doctor. Nonetheless, Bavon continued to develop his musical skills and spent some time playing with José Kayenge in the group Les Noirs.

Tensions between the two brothers came to a head when Franco visited Kayenge's home and destroyed three guitars in anger. Following the incident, Bavon left Kinshasa in 1961, at the age of seventeen, and moved to Boma in Bas-Congo. There, he briefly formed a band called Les Cousins Bleus. He also performed with Orchestre Coeur de Lion and worked alongside guitarist Dino Vangu at the Tati-bar. Dino Vangu was still a schoolboy but already gigging professionally, and they played together at the Sida-bar, where they also met Michelino Mavatiku Visi, who hailed from the Kitomesa district of Matadi.

=== Early 1960s–mid-1969: Beginnings in professional orchestras and Négro Succès ===
The disagreement within the family was eventually resolved, and Franco came to accept Bavon's decision to pursue a music career. Bavon began his professional career, although not within his brother's orchestra. In 1962, he joined Orchestre Cubana Jazz, where he performed alongside singer Bumba Massa. During this period, he also worked with Empompo Loway and Amba Zozo, both of whom remained important contacts throughout his career. He later moved to Orchestre Jamel. Vicky Longomba, singer of OK Jazz, nicknamed him "Marie-Marie" (derivating from marié-marié) because of his reputation for often being seen in the company of a different woman each day. In 1964, Bavon joined Orchestre Cobantou de Dewayon and played alongside guitarist Papa Noël Nedule. Under Papa Noël's guidance and through his own dedication, he developed his guitar technique and gained valuable experience as a musician, but his time with the group was brief, and he eventually left due to dissatisfaction with the orchestra.

The revival of Négro Succès, a band which was originally formed in 1961 but dissolved after a year of activity, came about through a remarkable act of fraternal reconciliation. When Bholen returned from Europe, he approached Franco for equipment to revive the band. Franco agreed to provide support on the condition that Bavon would be part of the new formation. On 15 December 1964, the reformed Négro Succès gave its first performance at the Bar Vis-à-Vis in Matonge, Kinshasa. Bavon and Bholen formed the core of the group. The founding lineup included Djeskain, Gaspy, Flujos, and Jojo as vocalists, Alphonse Epayo on bass guitar, Mogo on rhythm guitar, Fredos on congas, and Maproco and Bosmin on saxophone. Franco supplied Bavon with a guitar and amplifier.

Often compared with Franco, his way of guitar playing sounded very much like his older brother, but he played in a slightly more funky and up-tempo style, which made him a Kinshasa pop idol. His approach to the Odemba school, which Franco's TPOK Jazz had launched in the 1950s, was particularly influential. The horn section of Négro Succès contributed significantly to the band's distinctive sound. At various times, it included Moro Maurice Beya, Ruebens Kunsita, Rondot Kasango, and Empompo Loway. Their system of playing fanfare-type riffs in unison was remarkably similar in approach to the style associated with Verckys Kiamuangana Mateta, though the two bands arrived at this sound independently.

Between 1965 and 1967, Bavon emerged as one of the leading young stars of Congolese popular music. During this period, he composed several smash hits, including "Lucie Tozongana", "Nabosana Soseti", "Mille Zaïres pour Lucie", "Elongi Télévision", "Marie Marie", and "Nalingi Nakoma Moto". In early 1967, Négro Succès signed a recording contract with Roger Izeidi's Editions Tcheza. The agreement provided the band with professional equipment and standardized distribution through Fonior's European pressing plants. Around this time, the band released "Ngai Muana 15 Ans", composed by Bholen, which became the band's biggest hit and propelled it to the top of the Congolese music chart. Due to the song's popularity, the band was often informally referred to as "Négro Succès Bana 15 Ans". The song was written from the perspective of a fifteen-year-old girl. Later in 1967, the band signed another recording deal with Editions Boboto and traveled to Belgium for recording sessions. In the era of the Beatles and the Rolling Stones, when Johnny Hallyday was the principal francophone rock idol, Bavon often said he wanted to go to Paris to show the blousons noirs, the leather-jacket rockers, how to do it.

By 1968, Bavon Marie Marie and Négro Succès were at the apex of their popularity, rivalling the major Kinshasa orchestras for dominance of the dance halls and the airwaves. Its lineup had also become more stable, bringing together several talented musicians. During its most successful years, the orchestra included vocalists Léon "Zozo" Amba, Rocky Bokenenge, and Bijou, as well as saxophonist Empompo Loway, who joined around 1966, and Moro Maurice Beya Maduma, who joined in 1967. Future stars such as Nyboma and Tshimanga Assosa were also members for brief periods. A 1969 tour to Kenya was a significant milestone. Bavon was seen on the streets of Nairobi, and eyewitness accounts from the time describe the scale of his celebrity in East Africa.

=== 1970: Final works and death ===
Among all the recordings in Bavon Marie Marie's catalogue, two stand apart for the mythological weight that Kinshasa attached to them: "Libanga Na Libumu", meaning "a stone in the womb", and "Maseke Ya Meme", meaning "a sheep's horn". "Libanga Na Libumu" functioned as a sterile woman's meditation on witchcraft within the family structure, while "Maseke Ya Meme" was read by many as a prediction of the artist's imminent death. The lyrics of "Maseke Ya Meme" opened with the Lingala phrase "Famille oyo, motema mabe / Bondoki ekoma mosala", this family, hearts are wicked / witchcraft has become an occupation, and went on to describe the singer being entrusted with the burden of carrying the family's honor, a weight that he feared might crush him.

Bavon was by this time an alcoholic, as attested by Bholen. On the night of 5 August 1970, Négro Succès had a concert scheduled. Bavon had already been drinking before arriving at Bar Kimpwanza, where they learned the concert had been cancelled. The group dispersed, only to reconvene at Bar Vis-à-Vis for a concert by Johnny Bokelo's Conga 68 band. At the Vis-à-Vis, it was apparent that Bavon was heavily under the influence of both alcohol and, by some accounts, other substances. He played the congas, the bass guitar, and involved himself enthusiastically in everything, despite not being a member of that band. On his way out of the Vis-à-Vis, he ran into Franco, who told him to give him back the Renault 16 he had gifted to him. Bavon also encountered Marie-Josée Simplice, his girlfriend, who had come to the concert without his knowledge and whom he suspected to have flirted with singer Youlou Mabiala during an OK Jazz tour in Bangui. His son Aimé would later state that the argument was also triggered because Marie-Josée had left her children with her sister to attend the concert. In the confrontation that followed, Marie-Josée left by taxi. Bavon set off in pursuit, intercepted the taxi, took Marie-Josée into his car, and drove away at high speed. In the car a fight broke out between the two while he was driving. Bavon Marie Marie crashed his vehicle, the 1970 Renault 16, into a stationary Fiat truck loaded with wood near Cosbaki (the Bandalungwa-Kintambo sports complex), at the level of the Makelele bridge. The guitarist died at the scene. Marie-José Simplice survived but was left permanently unable to walk. At nearly sixteen years old, the young woman had to learn to get around in a wheelchair for the rest of her life. She eventually came to terms with her disability and died forty-four years later in December 2014 at the age of sixty.

Two posthumous LP records were released in 1970: L'Intrépide Bavon Marie Marie, compiled by Bholen Bombolo, and Bavon Marie Marie Accompagné par Jules Celestin & L'Orchestre Vox-Action, issued on the pioneering Congolese-Greek label Ngoma. Franco was filled with grief having lost his brother and he even retired temporarily from music. In 1971, he released his own version of Bavon's "Maseke Ya Meme", before recording the song "Kinsiona" (1972), meaning "sorrow", sung in Kintandu, the dialect of Franco's birth village of Sona Bata, paying homage to his brother.

== Legacy ==
Bavon Marie Marie's career lasted barely seven years, yet his influence proved durable, and it extended well beyond music. His look was as much a part of his success as his guitar playing, converting him into an idol, even a teen idol, despite being himself in his mid-twenties. Already born with a naturally lighter skin tone, he enhanced it further through bleaching products, and finished the effect with carefully applied eyeliner. His impeccably tailored suits, his self-proclaimed status as le plus bel homme de Kin, and his total mastery of stage presence combined to create a visual identity that young Kinshasa memorized. Such was the reach of this image that his particular haircut, which he wore consistently, became known simply as le bavon across the city, worn by admirers who wanted to claim some fraction of his glamour. Musically, guitarist Beniko Popolipo, a veteran of Zaïko Langa Langa and Koffi Olomidé's Quartier Latin International, recognized Bavon as a primary role model, as is the case for many other guitarists of the Third Generation of Congolese rumba.

== Personal life ==
He was survived by at least seven children from several women, including Matinda, Prudence, Elvis, Jolie, Aimé, Eric (born posthumously), Cathy, and Thierry.

== Selected discography ==
Two LP records of Négro Succès came out on the African label, and a few CD compilations were released in the 1990s. Since 2004, the original tapes were released by the Luambo family, and for the first time with permission of the family, a series of CDs was issued covering the legacy of Bavon Marie Marie.

=== Posthumous albums ===
Title	Year	Label	Format
L'Intrépide Bavon Marie Marie	1970	African	LP
Bavon Marie Marie Accompagné par Jules Celestin & L'Orchestre Vox-Action	1970	Ngoma	LP
Les Merveilles du Passé: Orchestre Négro Succès	1973	African	LP

=== Singles ===
Title	Year	Catalogue Number
"Mokolo Se Mokolo" / "Palado Palado"	1967	Epanza Makita
"Marie Marie" / "Lucie Pauni Ya Ntalo"	1967	Boboto BBT 18 / African 90.208 (1968)
"Lucie Tozongana" / "Phani"	1967	Tcheza T. 209
"Nabosana Soseti" / "Que Tenga Hora"	1967	Tcheza
"Mille Zaïres Pour Lucie" / "Décision Prise"	1968	Boboto BBT 46
"Chérie Vicky" / "Yo Se Que Soy"	1968	Boma Bango
"Bilamba Mbongo Ya Nani?"	c. 1968–69	Tcheza
"Nazongi Sima Po Na Yo" / "Nayei Lelo"	c. 1968–69	Tcheza T. 220
"Libanga Na Libumu" (Parts 1 & 2)	c. 1969–70	Réveillon No. 8 / Fiesta 51.030
"Maseke Ya Meme" / "Yalimbisa Bijou"	c. 1969–70	Fiesta 51.039
