= Lola Checain =

Congolese recording artist and composer

Lola Djangi Chécain (18 August 1942 - 10 August 1992) was a soukous recording artist, composer, and vocalist in the Democratic Republic of the Congo. He was once a member of the soukous band TPOK Jazz, led by François Luambo Makiadi, which dominated the Congolese music scene from the 1950s to the 1980s.

== Partial discography ==
- Emilie Na Gabon
- Lunda Maguy
- Gaby Ozali Coupable (1970)
- Nganda Ma Campagne (1973)
- Lukika (1974)
- Toboyana Kaka (1975)
- Baninga Tokola Balingaka Ngai Te (1975)
- Meka Okangama (1980)
- Libala ya Bana Na Bana
- Lolaka (1981)
- Mpo Na Nini Kaka Ngai? (1987)
- Sala Lokola Luntadila (1977)

== See also ==
- Franco Luambo Makiadi
- Sam Mangwana
- Josky Kiambukuta
- Simaro Lutumba
- Ndombe Opetum
- Youlou Mabiala
- Mose Fan Fan
- Wuta Mayi
- TPOK Jazz
- List of African musicians
