= Jolie Detta =

Congolese singer-songwriter, dancer, and evangelist

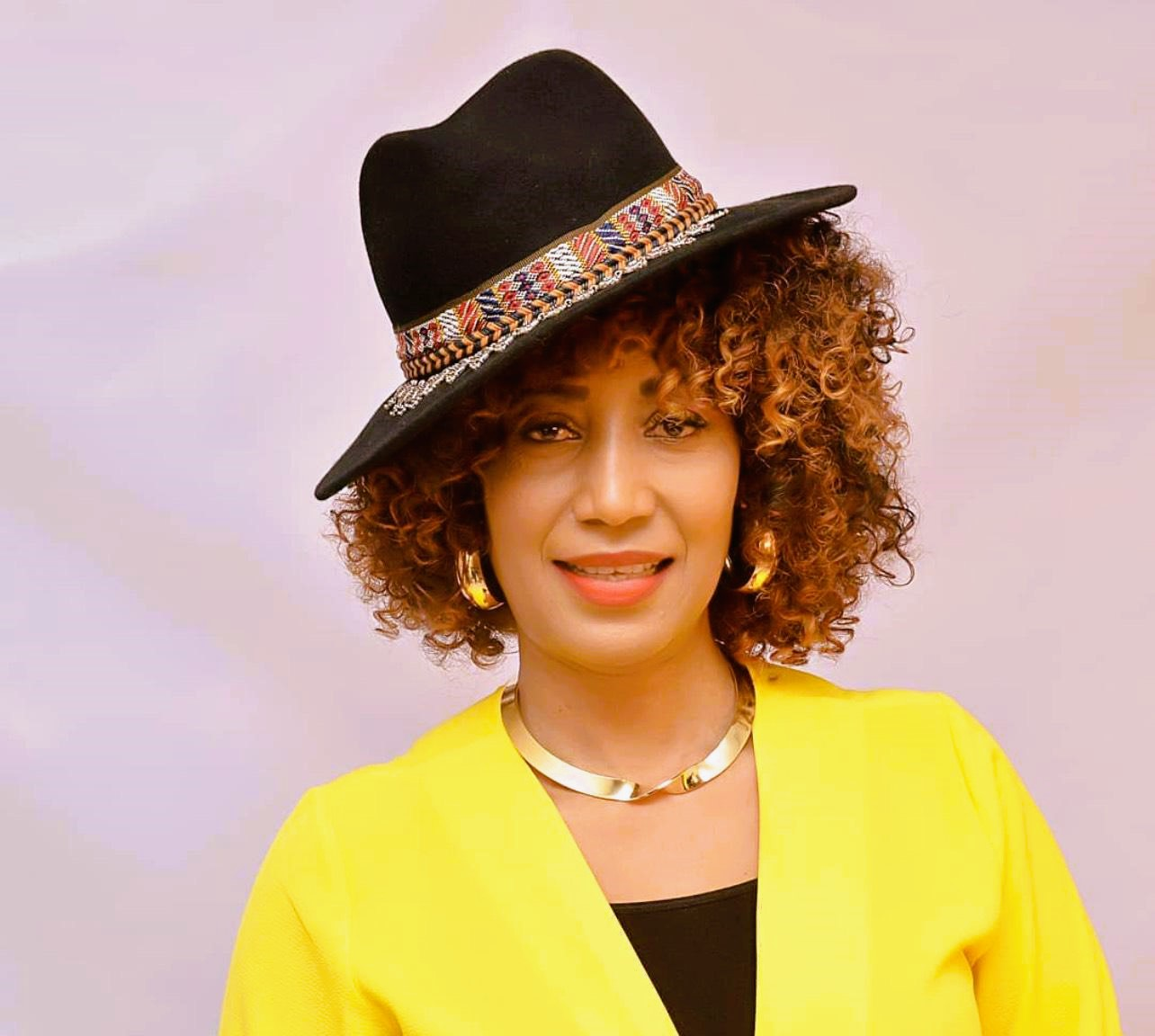
- Detta in 2019

Background information
- Also known as: Evangeliste Myriam Ndeka
- Born: Jolie Detta Kamenga Kayobote c. 1968; Kinshasa, Congo-Leopoldville (modern-day Democratic Republic of the Congo)
- Origin: Congolese
- Genres: Congolese rumba, soukous, and gospel
- Occupations: Singer-songwriter; dancer; evangelist
- Instrument: Vocals
- Years active: 1980s–present
- Labels: Choc Stars; SonoDisc; Edipop Production

Jolie Detta Kamenga Kayobote (born c. 1968), professionally known as Jolie Detta or Evangeliste Myriam Ndeka, is a Congolese singer-songwriter, dancer, and evangelist. She made her music debut with Choc Stars between 1983 and 1984.

In 1985, Detta joined Tabu Ley's Orchestre Afrisa International and then Franco Luambo's TPOK Jazz in 1986, where she gained national recognition as the lead vocalist in the band's Extended Play (EP) Le Grand Maitre Franco et son Tout Puissant O.K. Jazz et Jolie Detta, in collaboration with Franco and Simaro Lutumba. The EP included breakout singles "Massu", "Cherie Okamuisi Ngai", "Layile", and "Likambo Ya Somo Lumbe", which brought her into the spotlight with a debut tour to Kenya with TPOK Jazz that year. She later rejoined Choc Stars and recorded successful releases before joining Bozi Boziana's newly established Orchestre Anti-Choc in 1988 after Choc Stars disbanded. Anti-Choc's album La Reine de Sabah, released at the end of 1988, and its eponymous lead single, composed by Boziana, was named the Best Song of the Year and earned her the Best Voice of the Year for her performance.

From the 1990s to the 2000s, Detta devoted herself to Christian music, switching to gospel, and relocated to Luanda, Angola.

== Early life and work ==
Jolie Detta Kamenga Kayobote was born in 1968 in Kinshasa, First Congolese Republic. According to the Daily Nation, her parents were a Greek father and a Congolese mother. In 1983, Detta joined the soukous band Choc Stars in Kinshasa and contributed to the band's tracks as atalaku and leading vocalist. She caught the attention of Tabu Ley Rochereau and Franco Luambo during her performances when the duo were recording their two albums under Luambo's Choc label (Choc Choc Choc). She joined Tabu Ley's Afrisa International in 1985 and took the sobriquet "Samantha Ley".

Following her successful stint with Afrisa, she went on to join Franco's TPOK Jazz. In mid-1986, she was featured in Franco's EP Le Grand Maitre Franco et son Tout Puissant O.K. Jazz et Jolie Detta, which is a blend of Congolese rumba and soukous and includes collaboration with Simaro Lutumba. The EP features four tracks: "Massu", "Cherie Okamuisi Ngai", "Layile", and "Likambo Ya Somo Lumbe", and was produced by Franco's Edipop Production and Disques Espérance, a subsidiary of SonoDisc. "Massu" lyrics prominently features Detta's mellow voice with Franco's backing her up in the line "Matongi elekaki biso mbeka eh", followed by a more rhythmic sebéne segment characterized by swirling guitars and substantial brass percussion sections. "Layile", also composed by Franco, incorporated Franco's and Malage de Lugende's vocal input. Malage married into Detta's indispensable vocals. The two songs are considered amongst "the most memorable" within TPOK Jazz's discography.

Detta's association with the band concluded following the release of the two songs with some attributing her "premature" departure to a disagreement over remuneration issues with Franco. Franco, however, attributed her departure to her inability to handle the fame that came with the songs. She rejoined Choc Stars, made a few contributions, and later joined Boziana's newly established Orchestre Anti-Choc in 1988 after Choc Stars disbanded. Detta went on to do a number of duets with Boziana and later won the Best Voice of the Year for her performance on the Band's album La Reine de Sabah, released in 1989. She later found her footing as a solo in the 1990s and 2000s as a gospel artist.

== Discography ==
=== Studio albums ===
- Kobange (1985, with Mimi Ley & Afro International)
- Bola-Bola (1985)
- Le Grand Maitre Franco et son Tout Puissant O.K. Jazz et Jolie Detta (1986, with Franco and TPOK Jazz)
- Super Star (1986)
- Héritage (2000, as part of Couple Ndeka)
- Souviens-toi de moi et Frère Martin Wolf (2001)
