= Michelino Mavatiku Visi =

- Also known as: Michelliono, Michita
- Born: Mavatiku Visi; March 15, 1946 (age 80)
- Genre: Soukous
- Occupations: composer, arranger, producer, guitarist
- Instrument: Lead Guitar
- Years active: 1960 - Present
- Formerly of: Afrisa; TPOK Jazz

Mavatiku Michelino Visi, commonly known as Michelino, is a soukous recording artist, composer, guitarist and vocalist, in the Democratic Republic of the Congo (DRC). He was a member of the Congolese band African Fiesta Nationale, which was later renamed Afrisa International, led by Congolese music superstar, Tabu Ley. Later, in the early 1970s, Michelino left Afrisa and joined TPOK Jazz, led by François Luambo Makiadi, which dominated the Congolese music scene from the 1950s through the 1980s.

Born and raised by Angolan parents, in the Congolese port-city of Matadi, Michelino moved to Kinshasa, as a teenager. Michelino now lives, plays and teaches music in Paris, France. He has a band of about eight members.

== Discography ==
- Makfe - With Afrisa International
- Salima - With TP OK Jazz - Sung by Josky Kiambukuta, Ndombe Opetum and Wuta Mayi
- Cassins Clay - With Afrisa International
- Moussa - With Afrisa International

== See also ==
- Franco Luambo Makiadi
- Sam Mangwana
- Josky Kiambukuta
- Simaro Lutumba
- Ndombe Opetum
- Youlou Mabiala
- Mose Fan Fan
- Wuta Mayi
- TPOK Jazz
- List of African musicians
