= Malage de Lugendo =

- Born: 25 December 1961 (age 64); Bukavu, South Kivu, Congo-Leopoldville
- Genres: African Jazz
- Occupation: Recording artist
- Years active: 1976 - present

Malage de Lugendo (born 25 December 1961) is a Congolese soukous recording artist, composer and vocalist. He was a member of François Luambo Makiadi's seminal band TPOK Jazz, and Tabu Ley Rochereau's band Afrisa International.

== History ==
He was born in Bukavu, South Kivu, Democratic Republic of the Congo (DRC). He attended Boboto College in Kinshasa, the capital of the DRC. During the timeframe of 1976 and 1977, then a teenager aged 15 or 16, he became actively involved in music. Like many other musicians in Kinshasa, at the time, he joined several musician groups of his generation, including: Campagna, Oka and Jacula. He and others then founded Mekano.

In 1979, Malage met Empompo "Deyesse" Loway, an accomplished Congolese saxophonist, who introduced him to the group Tcheke-Tcheke-Love, where Empompo was a member. Malage joined the group. In 1980, Malage de Lugendo co-founded the band Afro-International with Mimi-Ley and Shiko Mawatu. The following year, in 1981, he was invited to go on a West African tour by music artist Mayaula Mayoni. The tour lasted a whole year.

== TPOK Jazz ==
On returning to the country, Mayaula introduced him to the Grand Master Franco Luambo Makiadi. He became a member of the soukous band TPOK Jazz, led by Franco, which dominated the Congolese music scene from the 1960s through the 1980s. The young singer featured in OK Jazz hits such as "Testament ya Bowule" in 1984", later followed by "Celio", "Chandra", "Boma Ngai naboma yo" and "Ekaba kaba". The seriousness and the experience propelled Malage to rise to status of General Secretary of the group OK Jazz in 1989. That same year, he left TPOK Jazz.

== After TPOK Jazz ==
He takes advantage of this course bad patch to take out a first album "Baiser de Judas" in 1988. In April, 1989, Malage integrates the group Zaïko Langa Langa, led by Jossart Nyoka Longo, which dominated the Congolese music scene from the 1970s through the 1990s. From the first album of the group, he takes out a successful tube "Leki ya Baby" in 1990. A few years later, he participates in the record "Les Asiatiques", together with Madilu System and Carlyto. The album will know an enormous success. In 1995, he takes out a record. The latter will cause his departure of Zaïko. He settled down then in Brussels with his family. He begins a solo career. In 1997, he takes out "Abulungani", first solo album. He will be followed in 2000 by "Pain quotidien". Since then, he intervenes in several musical projects in Africa, in Europe and in America. He takes advantage of it to get fresh ideas during eight years, to deliver the hit "SMS".

== See also ==
- Tabu Ley
- Sam Mangwana
- Josky Kiambukuta
- Simaro Lutumba
- Ndombe Opetum
- Youlou Mabiala
- Mose Fan Fan
- Wuta Mayi
- Djo Mpoyi
- Ntesa Dalienst
- TPOK Jazz
- List of African musicians
