= Mayaula Mayoni =

Congolese singer and guitarist (1946–2010)

- Born: Freddy Mayaula Mayoni; 6 November 1946; Léopoldville (now Kinshasa), Belgian Congo (now the Democratic Republic of the Congo)
- Died: 26 May 2010 (aged 63) Brussels, Belgium
- Genres: Soukous; Congolese rumba
- Occupations: Singer-songwriter; composer; guitarist; professional footballer
- Instruments: Vocals, guitar
- Years active: Early 1970s–2010
- Labels: Disc-Orient; Africa New Sound; Associated Sound Limited; Alia Music; Rythmes Et Musique; Kiamana Productions Services; Tamaris; Editions Akiyo & Fils; Éditions Ndiaye; Bade Stars Music
- Formerly of: Africana; TPOK Jazz; Mamaki

Freddy Mayaula Mayoni (6 November 1946 – 26 May 2010) was a Congolese soukous musician and professional footballer. Born and raised in Kinshasa, he first gained prominence as a left winger for AS Vita Club and was selected for the national team, the Leopards, in 1968. He later played in Dar es Salaam, where his father served as a diplomat, before continuing his studies in Belgium. There, his footballing abilities secured him spells with Royal Charleroi Sporting Club, Racing Jet de Bruxelles, and subsequently in Fribourg, Switzerland.

While in Charleroi, Mayaula began learning guitar and became a member of the band Africana, which was established by Congolese students. In 1975, he returned to Kinshasa and joined TPOK Jazz, led by Franco Luambo, who had previously served as his club president at AS Vita Club. His debut single, "Chérie Bondowe" (1975), achieved significant national success and earned him the accolade of Best Songwriter of the Year. In 1977, he co-founded the trio Mamaki alongside Youlou Mabiala and Josky Kiambukuta, before embarking on a solo career in the mid-1980s. Throughout his career, he composed and performed numerous hit songs, including "Ndaya", "Cicatrice", "Likama" (popularized by M'Pongo Love), "Momie" (1977) with TPOK Jazz, "Nabali Misère" (1979), "Veniuza" (1984), "Mokili Makambo" (1984), "Sauce Ya Bolingo" (1984), "Ousmane Bakayoko" (1992), and "Doudou a Mwen" (1992).

In January 2004, while serving as a cultural officer at the embassy of the Democratic Republic of the Congo in Dar es Salaam, Mayaula suffered hemiplegia. He was repatriated to Kinshasa in 2005, and subsequent efforts were made to arrange specialized medical treatment in Europe. He died in Brussels on 26 May 2010, reportedly following cardiac arrest.

== Early life, education, and football career ==
Freddy Mayaula Mayoni was born on 6 November 1946 in Léopoldville (now Kinshasa), in what was then the Belgian Congo (now the Democratic Republic of the Congo). He was raised in the Immo-Congo quartier of Kalamu commune. Between 1952 and 1958, he completed his primary education at Renkin (now Matonge), at Saint Jean Berchmans Primary School of Kalamu (École primaire Saint-Jean-Berchmans de Kalamu), and at the Protestant Primary School of Lisala. He later enrolled in secondary-level teacher training at the Protestant Baptist School of Kintambo, affiliated with the American Baptist Foreign Missionary Society (now the Communauté Baptiste du Congo Ouest; CBCO), and at the Collège Moderne Scientifique (now Collège Kubama) in Kisantu, where he graduated in 1962.

Mayaula began his football career as a left winger with AS Vita Club from 1967 to 1971, during which he gained a reputation for his technical dribbling and scoring ability. His performances earned him national recognition, and in 1968, he was selected for the Congolese national team, the Leopards. However, he retired from the sport at a relatively young age. He later stayed briefly in Dar es Salaam, where his father worked as a diplomat at the Congolese embassy in Tanzania, and played for Young Africans Sports Club. He later moved to Belgium to study computer science at the Catholic University of Louvain in Charleroi. During this period, he also played for Royal Charleroi Sporting Club and Racing Jet de Bruxelles, before eventually continuing his football career in Fribourg, Switzerland.

== Musical career ==
=== Early 1970s–1979: Early work ===
During his time in Charleroi, Mayaula seized the opportunity to learn guitar with the help of a fellow student and close friend. He joined a musical group of Congolese students known as Africana. The group featured Omari on lead guitar, Adolphe Phuati on bass, and Mayaula on accompanying guitar, with Marcus Mambuini and Teddy Kinsala as vocalists. In early 1975, he returned to Kinshasa with ambitions to pursue music professionally. He approached Franco Luambo, who had previously been his president at AS Vita Club, and requested to join TPOK Jazz. That same year, he released his debut song, "Chérie Bondowe", which stood out for its melody and thematic intrepidity. According to music journalist Jeannot Ne Nzau Diop, the lyrics were borrowed from Manuel d'Oliveira's earlier hit, "Chérie Bondowe" (alternatively titled "Chérie Bondowe, Ndumba Ya Matadi"). The song sparked controversy because it narrated the life of a prostitute from her own perspective, which led some to accuse it of prodding or justifying prostitution. As a result, "Chérie Bondowe" was proscribed by the National Commission for the Censorship of Songs and Performances. Nonetheless, in 1976, Franco and TPOK Jazz re-recorded the track in Brussels as "Bondowe II". Ironically, the ban only increased the song's popularity, and TPOK Jazz began performing it publicly. Music critics subsequently named Mayaula the Best singer-songwriter of the Year for his debut. He would win the same distinction several more times: in 1978 for "Bondowe II", in 1979 for "Nabali misère", in 1993 for "Ousmane Bakayoko", and again in 1994 for "L'amour au Kilo".

Between 1975 and 1980, Mayaula established himself as one of the country's greatest songwriters, with a series of titles. In 1976, Empompo Loway, who was mentoring M'Pongo Love alongside Les Ya Toupas du Zaïre, asked Mayaula to collaborate. Mayaula contributed the song "Ndaya", which became a smash hit. In 1977, he recorded "Momie" with TPOK Jazz, while Les Ya Toupas du Zaïre performed two of his other works, "Cicatrice" and "Likama".

Mayaula later joined Mabiala and Kiambukuta to create the trio Mamaki and subsequently released the hit "Bombanda compliqué". In 1979, as music from Brazzaville, led by figures such as Pamelo Mounk'a, Youlou Mabiala with Kamikaze Loningisa, and Pierre Mountouari, flooded the market, Mayaula's "Nabali misère" played a key role in sustaining the prominence of Congolese-Kinshasa productions in the face of strong regional competition.

=== 1980s–2004: Europe and solo career ===
In 1980, Mayaula assembled a group of emerging young vocalists, including Carlyto Lassa, Paul Lutumba, and Thylon, to collaborate on a recording project. The following year, he issued a six-track album under the Bade label, owned by Gérard Akuesson. The release included titles such as "Tonton Akue", "Omari", and "Aklanga", among others. With the support of Akuesson, the husband of Abeti Masikini, Mayaula embarked on a tour with Carlyto Lassa, Malage de Lugendo, and Paul Lutumba, traveling from Lomé, Togo, to Abidjan, Côte d'Ivoire, and eventually to Nairobi, Kenya. In Lomé, working under Akuesson's guidance, he recorded songs including "Veniuza", "Mokili Makambo", "Sauce Ya Bolingo", and the original version of "Ousmane Bakayoko", which was performed by Abeti Masikini and produced by African New Sound.

In 1985, Mayaula relocated to Europe, where he embarked on a solo career. Around this time, he offered the song "Baninga Nasi Nabali" to Tshala Muana, and it became one of her smash hits and stood out as one of the few Lingala songs she performed with notable success. Before eventually settling in France, Mayaula introduced vocalists Carlyto Lassa and Malage de Lugendo to Simaro Lutumba. After this, he experienced a long phase of relative inactivity. However, he later returned to prominence with the release of his debut European solo album, recorded with contributions from Pembey Sheiro and Carlyto Lassa. Entitled L'Amour Au Kilo, the record was released in 1992 by the Brazzaville-based Tamaris label and also distributed by Glenn Music that year. It had a strong impact in Paris, Brazzaville, and Kinshasa, and was supported by hits "Doudou a Mwen", "Ko Tika Te", "L'Amour Au Kilo", "Ousmane Bakayoko", and "Mamiwata". Mayaula composed and co-arranged the album with Ernest Mvouama, who also handled programming. The album brought together vocalists Carlyto Lassa, Kuleta Pompon, Pembey Sheiro, Abby Surya, Wamaniola, and 3615 Niaou, as well as bassist Ngouma Lokito, guitarists Dally Kimoko and Lokassa Ya Mbongo, and percussionist Mavungu Malanda. L'Amour Au Kilo significantly boosted his popularity as it gained widespread attention in Kinshasa, Brazzaville, and within the Congolese diaspora.

In 1995, Mayaula made his home in Dar es Salaam. Alongside his musical pursuits, he worked as the marketing director for the travel agency Oriental Travel Bureau. He later discovered that his latest record was being pirated in Tanzania and distributed through Dubai. In response, he filed a complaint with the copyright society and forwarded documentation to the embassy of the Democratic Republic of the Congo. Ambassador Mugalo, recognizing his expertise in cultural matters, appointed him cultural officer at the Congolese embassy in Tanzania. In 2000, he released the Éditions Ndiaye-produced Bikini, but the album failed to achieve the same level of commercial impact, largely due to limited promotional support. In 2004, he was honored with the Gold Medal of Merit in Arts, Sciences and Letters (Certificate No. 08/MASL), presented by Major General Benoît Faustin Munene, Chancellor of the National Orders. In 2004, he received the Gold Medal of Merit in Arts, Sciences and Letters (Certificate No. 08/MASL), awarded by the Chancellor of the National Orders, Major General Benoît Faustin Munene.

== Death ==
In January 2004, while serving as a cultural officer at the embassy of the Democratic Republic of the Congo in Dar es Salaam, Mayaula suffered a stroke that resulted in hemiplegia, which left the right side of his body paralyzed. He returned to Kinshasa in June 2005, but reportedly received no meaningful support, neither from colleagues in the music industry or from state authorities through royalty payments. Between August and December 2004, his family had appealed for humanitarian assistance from the Ministry of Culture, Arts and Heritage and the Ministry of Foreign Affairs to arrange his transfer to the Netherlands for specialized physiotherapy, but the appeal was denied.

Progress came in November 2005, when Sports Minister Roger Nimy approved a cost estimate prepared in Brussels by Dr. René Goffin of International Health Assistance (Assistance sanitaire internationale). With his intervention, the Minister of Public Health, Emile Bongeli, urged the Budget Ministry to assume responsibility for Mayaula's case and even authorized his travel abroad. However, the administrative process stalled.

It was not until early 2007, through persistent advocacy by the nonprofit Artiste en danger, led by singer Langu Masiama Tsaka Kongo, along with Chantal Safu, an advisor to president Joseph Kabila, that the case advanced within the Ministry of the Budget and awaited financial clearance. Government authorization was finally granted in July 2007, which allowed Mayaula to travel to Brussels for treatment. The organization later acknowledged the support of Raymond Tshibanda and ministers Victor Makwenge, Adolphe Muzito, and Athanase Matenda Kyelu.

He died in Brussels on 26 May 2010 around 1 a.m., reportedly following a cardiac arrest.

== Personal life ==
He was the father of one daughter, Mylène Mayaula, who is based in London.

== Discography ==
Selected discography
Title	Year	Label	Format
"Chérie Bondowe"	1975	Label – African	45-rpm
"Bondowe II"	1976	Label – African; Composed by, written by – Mayaula Mayoni; Rights society: SACEM	45-rpm
"Cicatrice"	1977	Label – Mayaula; Composed by – Mayaula Mayoni	45-rpm
"Nahizami"	1979	Label – Moninga Star Composed by – Mayaula Mayoni	45-rpm
"Nabali Misere"	1979	Label – Zebi; Written by, composed by – Mayaula Mayoni; Manufactured by – Mazadis (Manufacture Zaïroise du Disque); Distributed by – Moninga Star; Distributed by – Moninga	45-rpm
Mayaoula Mayoni Le Grand	1982	Produced by – Disc-Orient; Distributed by – Disc-Orient; Printed by: Imprimerie ILM - Abidjan; Written by, composed by – Mayaula Mayoni	LP
La Machine A Tube	1984	Produced by – Africa New Sound; Producer: Gérard Akueson and Assih; Written by, composed by – Mayaula Mayoni; Marketed by – Win Exports Ltd.; Marketed by – Tabansi Records Inc.; Marketed by – Tabansi Agencies Limited	LP
Veya	1986	Label – Associated Sound (East Africa) Limited (ASL); Copyright – Polygram Rec. (Disc Orient)	LP
Fiona-Fiona	1987	Label – Alia Music and Rythmes Et Musique; Written by, vocals, guitar [mi-solo], rhythm guitar, producer, percussion [gong] – Mayaula Mayoni	LP
Mizele	1990	Label – Kiamana Productions Services; Guitar [mi-solo guitar], rhythm guitar, percussion, mixed by, leader, concept by, directed by – Mayaula Mayoni; Recorded by – Alan Ward, Martin Bakala, Stephan	LP
L'Amour Au Kilo	1992	Label: Tamaris; Arranged by, composed by, lead vocals – Mayaula Mayoni; Arranged by, programmed by – Ernest Mvouama; Distributed by – SonoDisc	LP
Polygamie - Iyomi	Unknown	Label – Editions Akiyo & Fils; Distributed by – A.V.A. Promotions; Written by, composed by, arranged by – Mayaula Mayoni	LP
