= Ntesa Dalienst =

Congolese musician (1946–1996)

- Also known as: Dalienst
- Born: Daniel Ntesa Nzitani; 30 October 1946; Kinsiona, Cataractes District, Bas-Congo, Belgian Congo
- Died: 23 September 1996 (aged 49) Brussels, Belgium
- Genres: Congolese rumba; soukous
- Occupations: Singer; songwriter; bandleader
- Instrument: Vocals
- Years active: 1956–1996
- Labels: Afro-Disc; SonoDisc; Mélodie Distribution; Disco Stock; Éditions Vévé; Sango Music; Pathé Marconi; Lulonga; Visa 80; Rythmes Et Musique; Sans Frontieres; African Sun Music; La Deference Productions; Tchika; Associated Sound Limited
- Formerly of: Motema Jazz; Vox Africa; Festival des Maquisards; Les Grands Maquisards; TPOK Jazz; Champions du Zaïre; Afri-Jazz
- Spouse: Thérèse Mavata Nkue

Daniel Ntesa Zitani (30 October 1946 – 23 September 1996), known professionally as Ntesa Dalienst or Dalienst, was a Congolese singer-songwriter. Known for his high-pitched mezzo-soprano vocal range, he is regarded as a significant figure in the evolution of 20th-century Congolese and African popular music. His hits include "Jarria", "Maria Mboka", "Tokosenga na Nzambe", "Obotama Mobali Ndima Pasi", "Biki", "Muzi", "Bina na ngai na respect", "Tantine" and "Mulele".

Born in Kinsiona, Kongo Central, Ntesa began his career in 1956, at the age of ten, when he formed a youth band called Motema Jazz. After completing his secondary education, he briefly pursued a teaching career at the junior secondary level before committing fully to music in 1966. The following year, he relocated to Kinshasa, where he joined Vox Africa, the orchestra led by Jeannot Bombenga. In 1968, he became a member of Festival des Maquisards before it disbanded a year later. Later in 1969, Ntesa co-founded Les Grands Maquisards with Dizzy Mandjeku, under the patronage of Verckys Kiamuangana Mateta's label, Vévé Éditions. In 1976, he joined Franco Luambo's TPOK Jazz, where he served as bandleader for several years and contributed to some of the band's most breakout hits. Following Franco's death in 1989, Ntesa briefly performed with Les Champions du Zaïre, a collective of TPOK Jazz veterans based in Brussels, having earlier revived Les Grands Maquisards in 1988. In 1994, he co-founded Afri-Jazz, a band that brought together seasoned musicians from Orchestre Afrisa International and TPOK Jazz alongside younger Congolese performers.

Ntesa died in Brussels on 23 September 1996, at the age of 49, following complications from brain surgery for a tumor.

== Life and career ==
=== 1946–1966: Early life and career beginnings ===
Daniel Ntesa Nzitani was born on 30 October 1946 in Kinsiona, Cataractes District, Bas-Congo (now Kongo Central), in the Belgian Congo (later the Republic of the Congo, then Zaire, and today the Democratic Republic of the Congo). He began his education in 1951 at Christ-Roi in Kasa-Vubu, Kinshasa, under Catholic instruction. In 1956, at the age of ten, he established a youth orchestra called Motema Jazz, performing with improvised instruments, including tin cans and handcrafted guitars. During this period, he attended a Catholic missionary school in N'Djili, where he participated in the choir and received training in liturgical music. Born to Kimbanguist parents, his father intended for him to sing in a kintuadi choir, part of the early Kimbanguist movement. Ntesa later attended boarding school in Nkamba and then the teacher training school in Gombe-Matadi, where he continued to develop his vocal skills under the guidance of a singing teacher.

After completing his secondary education, Ntesa taught for one year at the Orientation Cycle (Cycle d'Orientation; junior secondary level) before embarking on a professional music career in 1966. He adopted the stage name Dalienst, an anagram derived from his birth name: combining "Da" and "iel" from Daniel (with a rearrangement of the letters "l" and "ie") and "nst" from Ntesa, creating Dalienst.

=== 1967–1975: Vox Africa, Festival des Maquisards, and Les Grands Maquisards ===
In 1967, Dalienst joined the Vox Africa orchestra, led by Jeannot Bombenga, performing alongside Sam Mangwana. He gained early recognition with songs such as "Aline" and "Likuta ya pembeni epekisami". In 1968, Sam Mangwana and Jean-Paul Vangu Diakanua (alias Guivano or Guvano) left Tabu Ley Rochereau's African Fiesta National to form the orchestra Festival des Maquisards, which sought for a modernized sound. Their performances at Engels Bar, later renamed Un, Deux, Trois, earned them considerable fame in Mbandaka and Kisangani. The band received essential backing from Captain Denis Ilosono, private secretary to President Mobutu Sese Seko, and Alphonse Roger Kithima Bin Ramazani, who provided them with instruments. Dalienst joined Festival des Maquisards, which also included Lokombe Bola Bolite, Dizzy Mandjeku, Jean Bokosa (Johnny), Michelino Mavatiku Visi, and Diana, who had recently departed African Fiesta National. In 1969, however, Festival des Maquisards faced severe challenges after the arrest of Ilosono by the special services and the confiscation of their equipment during a tour in Mbuji-Mayi, Kasaï Oriental. The musicians were forced to make their own way back to Kinshasa, with Sam Mangwana and Guivano managing to return while the others were left stranded. Following this ordeal and internal divisions that same year, Guivano formed Orchestra Dua, Sam Mangwana renamed his band Festival de Sam, Lokombe, a government employee, returned to public service, and Diana rejoined African Fiesta National. According to Zéphyrin Nkumu Assana Kirika, the band officially disbanded on 2 September 1969, although Samuel Malonga suggests it took place in July 1969.

Dalienst, feeling uncertain and considering a return to Vox Africa, was advised by Dizzy Mandjeku to establish a new orchestra, which led to the formation of Les Grands Maquisards with the support of Verckys Kiamuangana Mateta, and with Lokombe and Diana rejoining the project. The orchestra made its official debut on 10 October 1970 at Vis-à-Vis, a popular nightclub in Matonge. Les Grands Maquisards' emergence marked a significant moment in the Congolese music scene, alongside prominent bands such as African Jazz, led by Joseph Athanase Tshamala Kabasele (Le Grand Kallé); OK Jazz, led by Franco Luambo; African Fiesta National, led by Tabu Ley Rochereau; African Fiesta Sukisa, led by Nico Kasanda (Docteur Nico); Centrale; and Bamboula, led by Papa Noël Nedule. Dizzy Mandjeku, an employee of the Central Bank, financed rehearsals for the newly formed orchestra. Dalienst released "Obotami Mobali Ndima Pasi", a song reflecting the challenges following the dissolution of Festival des Maquisards. Despite obstacles, the orchestra maintained cohesion and achieved widespread success. Les Grands Maquisards' core members included vocalists Dalienst, Lokombe, Diana, Kiese Diambu, and Loulou (Pop); lead guitarists Dizzy Mandjeku and Mageda; mi-solo guitarist Kalambay; rhythm guitarist Dave Makondele; bassist Franck Nkodia; tumba player Domsis; drummer Tambu Tabi; saxophonist Michel Saxo; and trumpeters Mambert, Jeannot, and Jean-Marie Kabongo. They recorded six discs for Verckys Kiamuangana Mateta's Vévé Editions, including "Mado" (Lokombe), "Esese" (Diana), and Dalienst's "Obotami Mobali Ndima Pasi", "Maria Mboka", "Biki 1 & 2", and "Tokosenga na Nzambe", which became influential hits.

During this early 1970s, Vévé Editions released the first albums of Les Grands Maquisards, which attracted attention in Kinshasa and Brazzaville. Verckys promoted them by displaying record covers on his property in Avenue Eyala, Kalamu. They quickly established themselves as one of the leading acts in Kinshasa, Brazzaville, Pointe-Noire, and other parts of Central Africa. Later, Aimé Kiwakana joined Les Grands Maquisards. Following these initial successes, the orchestra produced other notable hits, including "Mabala ya Kinshasa", "Kaka po na ye" (Dizzy Mandjeku), "Sonia" (Diana), "Kayumba Marthe" and "Tolimbisana" (Lokombe), "Jarrya" and "Kiese" (Kiese Diambu), "Mavata", "Beneda", "Sisi Moke" (Dalienst), and "Kimbokoto" (Franck Nkodia). However, despite their growing reputation, the band members, young and inexperienced in business, received only modest fixed salaries and were unaware of copyright and royalty procedures. Disillusioned by their arrangement with Éditions Vévé, the band ultimately disbanded in 1975. According to the Agence d'Information d'Afrique Centrale, their sudden disappearance evoked profound "nostalgia among fans and music lovers across both banks of the Congo River, in Africa, and beyond".

=== 1976–1993: TPOK Jazz and Afri-Jazz ===
Following Les Grands Maquisards' dissolution, Dizzy Mandjeku founded a new band, Kossa-Kossa, sponsored by Miezi, proprietor of the La Suzanella Maison Blanche dance bar. Although he invited his former colleagues to join, Dalienst, Kiese Diambu, and Michel Saxo declined.

In 1976, Dalienst was recruited by Franco Luambo to join TPOK Jazz, alongside lead guitarist Thierry Mantuika. Dalienst remained with the band for nine years, serving as bandleader for seven. During this period, he composed and performed "Muzi" (1980) and "Bina na ngai na respect" (1981), both of which were voted best songs of their respective years. These works earned him recognition as Best Singer and Best Songwriter-Composer for two consecutive years. "Bina na ngai na respect", a piece urging men to dance respectfully with married women, became one of TPOK Jazz's signature hits, known for its harmonies featuring Josky Kiambukuta, Wuta Mayi, and Lukoki, complemented by Gerry's guitar and Decca Mpudi's bass. TPOK Jazz was twice honored as Best Orchestra of the Year. In 1982, the band released the album Princesse Kiku, which included compositions by Franco ("Princesse Kiku"), Pépé Ndombe ("Mawe"), and Josky ("Nostalgie Tanzi"). Dalienst's contribution, "Tantine", portrays a man admonishing a woman, urging her to conduct herself with dignity, to behave respectably, and to refrain from promiscuity for the sake of her child. That same year, he participated in TPOK Jazz's Brussels sessions and recorded "Coup de foudre" ("Love at First Sight") for the album Maracas d'or, where he also performed Papa Noël Nedule's "Tangawizi". By the early 1980s, Dalienst was regarded as one of the foremost vocalists and composers in Zaire, performing alongside Josky and Madilu System during the band's golden era. In 1984, his song "Muzi" was included in the medley Africa Music Non Stop recorded by Cameroonian musician and producer Elvis Kemayo.

Dalienst settled permanently in Brussels in 1985 and collaborated that year with Josky and Serge Kiambukuta on a joint album. The following year, he provided the lead vocals for the hit "Bourreau de cœurs", also widely known as "Namiswi Misapi", composed by Bonyeme Dennis. In 1987, Dalienst rejoined TPOK Jazz and released his debut solo studio album Mamie Zou, produced by Franco and performed with members of TPOK Jazz. The album contained four songs "Mamie Zou", "Dodo", "Nalobi na ngai rien", and "Batindeli ngai mitambo", and was noted for its melodies and themes of love. In "Mamie Zou", a woman expresses gratitude to her husband for two decades of marital happiness, while in "Dodo", a husband longs for fifty years of marriage like their parents before them and ponders whether future generations will share such lasting love.

In 1988, at the age of 41, Dalienst endeavored to revive Les Grands Maquisards, forming a new version of the orchestra brought together Belgian and Congolese musicians, among them saxophonist Didan. The band mainly performed in Brussels. Following Franco's death in 1989, Dalienst temporarily joined Champions du Zaïre, a band composed chiefly of TPOK Jazz's Brussels-based members. In 1990, he and Les Grands Maquisards released his last studio album Belalo, featuring Dizzy Mandjeku and Dieudos Makuanzi on guitar and Carlyto Lassa as vocalist.

In 1994, Dalienst co-founded the orchestra Afri-Jazz, bringing together veteran musicians from Orchestre Afrisa International and TPOK Jazz alongside younger performers. The band's lineup included Wuta Mayi, Michelino Mavatiku Visi, Papa Noël Nedule, Shaba Kahamba, Youlou Mabiala, Bopol Mansiamina, Pompon Kuleta, Diasi, Ada Muangisa, Serge Kiambukuta, Michel Sax, Monglisha, Caien Madoka, Egide, Djudju, Salo, Armando, and Niau. Their only release, Frappe chirurgicale aérienne ("Aerial Surgical Strike"), came out in 1995 and featured eight songs.

== Illness and death ==
In May 1996, Dalienst was admitted to Brussels' Saint-Pierre University Hospital after experiencing paralysis on the left side of his body. Despite the uncertainty surrounding his diagnosis, he remained hopeful about regaining his health. A surgical procedure later that month revealed the presence of an inoperable brain tumor. His health declined swiftly in the following weeks, and he died on 23 September 1996 at age 49.

== Legacy ==
In December 2001, a commemorative event was held on the terrace of the Officers' Mess (Mess des Officiers) in Brussels, featuring performances by the orchestra Bana Poto-Poto under Bienvenu Roland Faignond, and by musicians Dizzy Mandjeku, Michel Sax, Franck Nkodia, Domsis, Dave Makondele, Malage de Lugendo, Verckys Kiamuangana Mateta, Jeannot Bombenga, and Jean Serge Essous, who performed the hits of Les Grands Maquisards. The program also included songs by Franklin Boukaka, Le Grand Kallé, Docteur Nico, and Tabu Ley Rochereau. The tribute featured speeches, testimonies, dancing, and an autograph session, attended by Dalienst's widow, Thérèse Mavata Nkue, and their children.

During a later edition of the Kora Awards, the Malian singer Salif Keita, when invited by a Kinshasa television presenter to perform a song by a Congolese musician, chose Dalienst's "Muzi".

In conjunction with these tributes, writer Jean-Claude Gakosso published the biography Ntesa Dalienst et la sublime épopée des Grands Maquisards. The 95-page work, presented in a semi-novelized format, documents Ntesa's life, the history of Les Grands Maquisards, and the music of the two Congos.

== Personal life ==
In 1974, after a three-year courtship, he married Thérèse Mavata Nkue, with whom he had four children, including the singer Christelle Ntesa (known professionally as Christy Lova). Their union influenced his work, inspiring many of his romantic compositions, evident in the songs "Mamie Zou" and "Dodo" from his 1987 album Mamie Zou.
