= TPOK Jazz =

Congolese rumba band

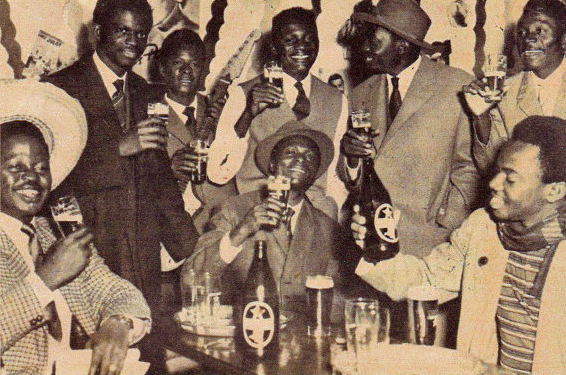
- Members of OK Jazz in Brussels, 1961

Background information
- Also known as: OK Jazz
- Origin: Belgian Congo; Republic of Congo; Zaire
- Genres: Congolese Rumba
- Years active: 1956–2004

OK Jazz, later renamed TPOK Jazz (short for Tout Puissant Orchestre Kinois de Jazz), was a Congolese rumba band from the Democratic Republic of the Congo established in 1956 and fronted by Franco.

After Franco died in 1989, Simaro Lutumba, the band's vice-president and principal songwriter, became the bandleader. Initially, TPOK Jazz continued their activities with little interruption, as Lutumba had previously been responsible for administrative duties and had overseen the Kinshasa branch of the band when Franco was based in Europe. However, in 1993, disputes emerged between the musicians and Franco's family concerning the division of income and ownership of the band's instruments. Lutumba indicated that the family sought a 60–40 revenue apportionment in their favor, a proposal that the musicians rejected. Additional disputes emerged over claims that performances were being organized without the family's consent, which prompted efforts to repossess the instruments for tighter supervision. An ultimatum issued to Lutumba ultimately led to his resignation, and most of the members followed him to create Bana OK under his leadership.

Franco's son, Yves Emongo Luambo, later attempted to restore TPOK Jazz by recruiting former members Youlou Mabiala and Michel Boyibanda to head the revival. Although both initially acquiesced, Boyibanda subsequently recanted, reportedly due to leadership-related dissensions. Mabiala continued with the initiative and officially reinstated TPOK Jazz on 24 December 1996. Musicologist Clément Ossinondé notes that this revived version of the band had become inactive by August 2004.

== Location ==
The OK Jazz band was formed in 1956 in Léopoldville (now Kinshasa), in what was at the time the Belgian Congo (now the Democratic Republic of the Congo). At one time in the late 1970s and early 1980s the band grew to more than fifty members. During that period, it often split into two groups; one group stayed in Kinshasa, playing in nightclubs there, while the other group toured in Africa, Europe and North America.

== History ==
=== 1950–1959 ===
The musicians who started OK Jazz included Vicky Longomba, Jean Serge Essous, François Luambo Makiadi, De La Lune, Augustin Moniania Roitelet, La Monta LiBerlin, Saturnin Pandi, Nicolas Bosuma Bakili Dessoin and vocalist Philippe Lando Rossignol. They used to play at Loningisa Studios in Kinshasa as individual artists, before they got together to form a band in June 1956. The name OK Jazz originated from the bar where they played, which was called the OK Bar, owned by Gaston Cassien (who later changed his name to Oscar Kashama, after Authenticité). The new band played regularly at a specific studio in the city during the week, and on some weekends they played at weddings. In 1957, the lead vocalist, Philippe Lando Rossignol, quit OK Jazz and was replaced by Edo Nganga, from Congo-Brazzaville. Later in the same year, Isaac Musekiwa, a saxophonist from Zimbabwe, joined the band. Up to that time the band's leadership was shared between Vicky Longomba, Essous and Franco.

=== 1960–1969 ===
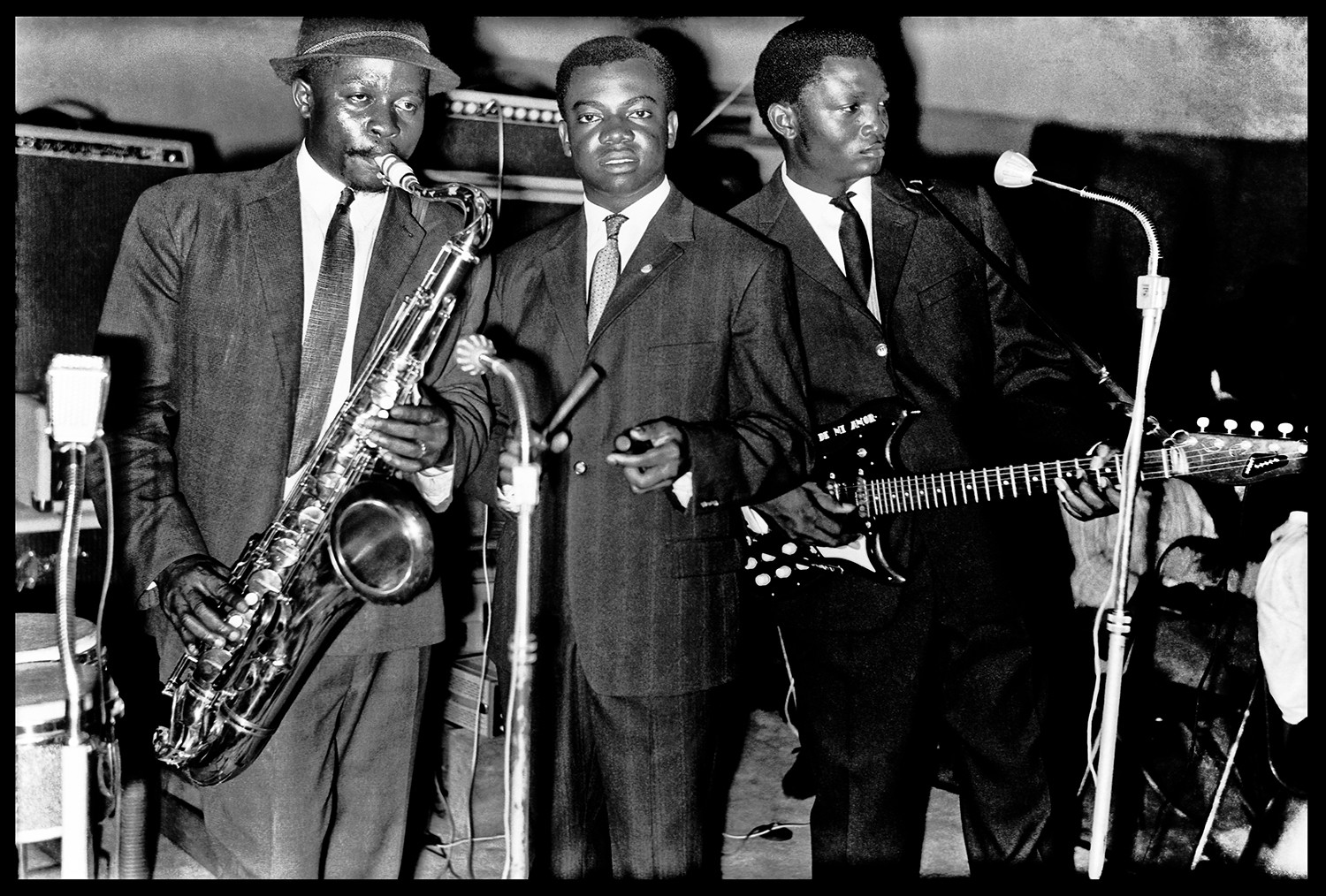
Franco Luambo (right), Isaac Musekiwa (left), and Joseph "Mujos" Mulama (center) in Léopoldville, ca. 1963

In the early 1960s Vicky Longomba and Jean Essous left OK Jazz to join African Jazz. Franco then became the leader of the band. He recruited vocalists Kwamy Munsi and Mulamba Joseph Mujos. Simaro Masiya Lutumba joined OK Jazz in 1961. Essous was replaced by saxophonist Verckys Kiamuangana Mateta. In 1962 OK Jazz visited Nigeria on their first foreign tour. Later that year, Vicky Longomba rejoined the band. Lola Checain, a vocalist who had left earlier also came back.

Around this time, the band changed their name to TPOK Jazz. TP stood for "Tout Puissant" (all mighty). Band membership had increased to over twenty. The quality of their music had improved to where they could challenge African Jazz for the position of Congo's premier group. Franco's music had such popular appeal mainly because it discussed issues affecting ordinary people on a daily basis. Franco led other Congolese musicians in using new technology to produce sounds of much higher quality than in any other part of Africa. The new technology included electric guitars, amplifiers and basses. Congo had now assumed the premier position as Africa's leading music nation. During the late 1960s, Kwamy Munsi and Mulamba Joseph Mujos led nine other musicians in a mass defection from TPOK Jazz. A few months later, saxophonist Verckys Kiamuangana Mateta also left. Franco recruited Rondot Kassongo wa Kassongo to replace Verckys. He also brought in solo guitarist Mose Fan Fan. Fan Fan had a new style of guitar-playing called sebene, which was more danceable. This style came to be known as Sebene ya ba Yankees. Fan Fan also composed a number of extremely popular hits, including "Dje Melasi".

=== 1970–1975 ===
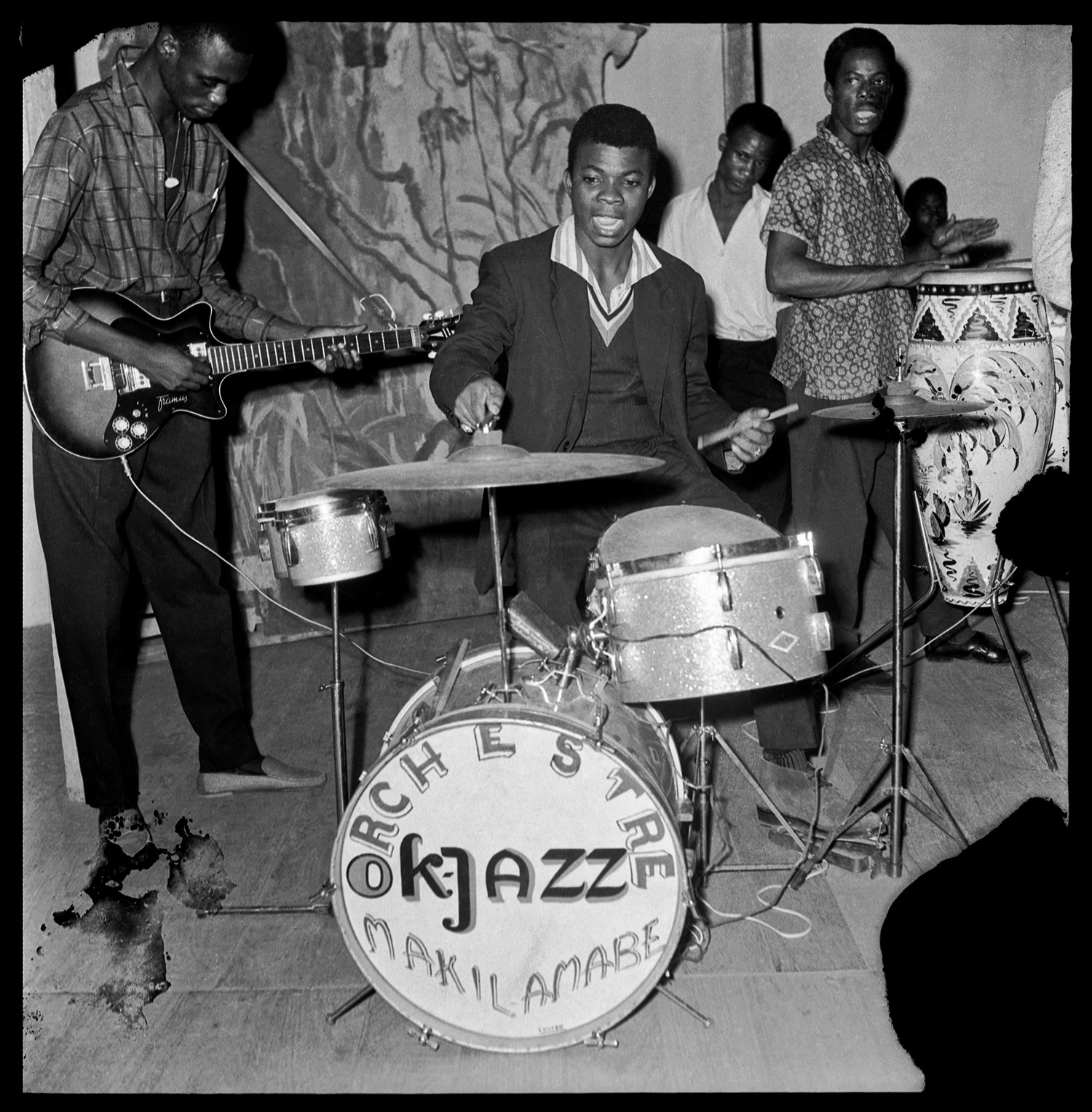
Drummer of TPOK Jazz in Léopoldville

During the 1970s, Franco and TPOK Jazz consolidated their position as one of the two giants of Congolese popular music, along with Grand Kalle & l'African Jazz. Many musical stars emerged from both of these bands. TPOK Jazz was staging concerts all over Africa, including places such as Chad and Sudan. The band's finances also improved tremendously.

Franco brought on board the composer/vocalist Sam Mangwana, born in Kinshasa, DRC to Angolan parents. He spoke English, Lingala, French and Portuguese, along with a number of other African languages. His recruitment energised the band and infuriated Afrisa, where he came from.

In early 1970 Vicky Longomba, who was then acting as co-president of the band left. Mose Fan Fan, the band's flamboyant solo guitarist also left. Then Youlou Mabiala quit and formed Orchestre Somo Somo with Fan Fan. Soon after that Bavon Marie Marie, Franco's biological brother died in an automobile accident. The band fell upon hard times with low record sales and as sparsely attended concerts. Franco was grief-stricken and despondent and stopped playing music for some time. Upon his return, he recorded several songs in memory of his late brother.

He then began to rebuild the band. This coincided with the restructuring of Congo by President Mobutu Sese Seko under the program of "L'Authenticite". The name of the country was changed from Congo-Kinshasa to Zaire. Franco adopted the names "L'Okanga La Ndju Pene Luambo Luanzo Makiadi". During this time, vocalist Mayaula Mayoni came on board, along with guitarists Mpundi Decca, Gege Mangaya, Michelino Mavatiku Visi and Thierry Mantuika. Franco then appointed Simaro Lutumba, as the chef d'orchestre. Sam Mangwana composed his hit Luka Mobali Moko around this time.

In 1973, Josky Kiambukuta Londa, a seasoned composer and vocalist, joined the band. That same year, TPOK Jazz toured East African countries such as Zambia and Tanzania for the first time. During one of their performances in Tanzania, an overly excited crowd caused a crush that killed two people. In 1974, Youlou Mabiala returned to TPOK Jazz. However, Sam Mangwana left and started a solo career in Côte d'Ivoire. Ndombe Opetum was recruited from Afrisa International to replace Mangwana. He came along with hornsman Empompo Loway. In 1975 Franco released yet another classic hit Bomba Bomba Mabe.

=== 1976–1979 ===
By the mid-1970s Franco was one of Zaire's wealthiest citizens. He invested heavily in real estate in Belgium, France and in Zaire. He owned Kinshasa's four largest and most popular nightclubs, the biggest of which was Un-deux-trois. TPOK Jazz played there every weekend to a packed house. In 1976, vocalist Zitani Dalienst Ya Ntesa and guitarist Gerry Dialungana were convinced to join TPOK Jazz. Mayaula Mayoni composed a song, Cheri Bondowe which was released in an album that also included Alimatou and Bisalela.

In 1977 Franco introduced a handicapped female singer known as Mpongo Love. Despite her handicap which was the result of childhood polio, she went on to become one of the continents most popular singers on the strength of her charming, vivacious voice and her songwriting. Papa Noël Nedule, an accomplished guitarist joined soon after that. Later that year the band represented Zaire in what was Africa's largest ever cultural event, Festac 77 which was staged in Lagos, Nigeria.

In 1978 Franco released two songs — "Helene" and "Jacky" — that were deemed "indecent" by the Attorney General of his native country. After a brief trial, he was convicted and sent to prison, along with other band members, including Simaro Lutumba. Franco was released two months later, following street protests. That same year, Mayaula Mayoni released the song "Nabali Misere" (I am married to misery). He quit the band soon afterwards, to pursue a solo career.

In 1979 Franco moved his recording base from Kinshasa to Brussels, Belgium, to take advantage of superior recording facilities. Franco embarked on a tour of eight West African countries. That same year Josky released Propretaire.

=== 1980–1989 ===
This period marked the pinnacle in the success of the band and that of its leader, Franco. The band was releasing an average of four albums a year during this period. The rival Congolese bands, Afrisa International and Orchestre Veve could not keep up with the competition. Life was good. In 1982 Sam Mangwana returned briefly and released an album with Franco called Cooperation. Franco also released several albums with former nemesis Tabu Ley. In 1983 TPOK Jazz toured the United States of America for the first time. That year the song "Non", featuring Madilu System and Franco in alternating lead vocals, was released.

In the mid-1980s the band continued to churn out best sellers including Makambo Ezali Borreaux, 12,600 Letters to Franco, Pesa Position, Mario and Boma Ngai na Boma Yo. By this time, Madilu System had taken over as the lead vocalist. In 1986, Josky Kiambukuta and Zitani Dalienst Ya Ntesa, two vocalists who felt they were not getting enough prime time exposure led another mass exodus to form their own band. Around this time, Simaro Lutumba released an album outside the TPOK Jazz system, featuring the song "Maya". During the same timeframe, Malage de Lugendo, a vocalist, was recruited. Also Kiesse Diambu ya Ntessa from Afrisa International and female vocalist Jolie Detta came on board.

At the beginning of 1987, Franco released a 15-minute song with the title "Attention Na Sida" (Beware of AIDS), from the eponymous album. Sung mainly in French amid heavy African drums and a kaleidoscope of thundering guitars, the song is moving even if one does not understand all the words. That same year, TPOK Jazz was invited to perform at the 4th All-Africa Games held at the Moi International Sports Centre in Nairobi, Kenya. Among the eight albums released by the group in 1987 was Les On Dit, which marked the debut of two female vocalists, Nana Akumu and Baniel Bambo. The following year, Josky made his return to the band, while Dalienst considered reviving "Les Grands Maquisards", a plan that ultimately did not materialize. That year, Dalienst also launched his debut solo album, Mamie Zou, produced by Franco and recorded with the help of TPOK Jazz. The album featured four songs: "Mamie Zou", "Dodo", "Nalobi na ngai rien", and "Batindeli ngai mitambo". However, 1989 brought significant challenges. Franco's health had deteriorated severely, and he had permanently relocated to Brussels. His public performances became infrequent and short, typically lasting no more than twenty minutes. The band began to unravel as prominent members, including Malage de Lugendo, Dizzy Mandjeku, and Djo Decca, left to pursue other ventures in Kinshasa. Despite these difficulties, Franco collaborated with Sam Mangwana on the album Forever, which was released later that year. The album sleeve carried a photograph of Franco in which he appeared emaciated and obviously in ill-health. It turned out to be Franco's last album.

Franco died on 12 October 1989 in a Brussels hospital. His body was repatriated to Zaire, where he received a state funeral on 17 October 1989, organized by President Mobutu's government, following four days of national mourning.

=== 1990–2004 ===
==== Post-Franco TPOK Jazz and the birth of Bana OK ====
After Franco's death, TPOK Jazz's leadership was assumed by Simaro, alongside Josky, Ndombe Opetum, and Madilu System. In an agreement with the Franco family, the band established a revenue-sharing arrangement, allocating 70% of profits to the musicians and 30% to the family. This agreement held from August 1989 until December 1993. During this period, the band released Hommage à Luambo Makiadi, an album composed of material recorded prior to Franco's death. Solo projects also flourished: Josky released a record featuring the song "Chandra", while Simaro issued two albums, one including the hit "Eau Bénite" performed by Madilu, and another entitled Somo, which featured "Marby" (composed by Josky) and "Mort Vivant Somida" (composed by Madilu). TPOK Jazz continued to perform across Africa and Europe, although it faced continued defections.

In December 1993, a dispute over the profit-sharing agreement led to a rupture between the musicians and the Franco family. Franco's sister, Louise Akangana, reclaimed musical instruments owned by her brother, which effectively ended the collaboration. Despite mediation attempts by the Zairean authorities, reconciliation was not achieved. On 1 February 1994, the remaining musicians, under Simaro's leadership, officially founded a new band: Bana OK.

==== Revival efforts and the band's decline ====
In an effort to preserve Franco's musical legacy, his son Yves Emongo Luambo sought to revive TPOK Jazz. He enlisted former band members Youlou and Boyibanda to lead the initiative. Although both initially agreed, Boyibanda later withdrew, allegedly due to leadership conflicts. Mabiala proceeded with the project, incorporating younger musicians from Kinshasa and Brazzaville, including former colleagues from his Kamikaze band. On 24 December 1996, Mabiala relaunched TPOK Jazz and released the controversial song "Mwana Ya Luambo". The track, which criticized Simaro's faction for allegedly betraying Franco's memory, caused tension within the Congolese musical community. Declaring himself "Mwana Luambo" ("Luambo's son"), Mabiala reinforced his symbolic claim to Franco's legacy by marrying the late musician's eldest daughter, Marie-Hélène Luambo, also known as "Mama Leti".

Under Mabiala's leadership, TPOK Jazz briefly regained vitality and visibility through new albums and performances. However, on 15 August 2004, during a concert in Pointe-Noire, Mabiala suffered a hypertensive crisis, effectively marking the end of TPOK Jazz as an active band.

== Band members ==
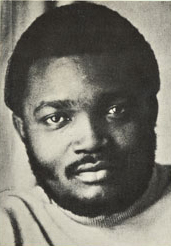
Franco Luambo Makiadi, leader of the band

TPOK Jazz had many members over the nearly 38 years of its existence. The list of band members reads like a "Congolese Music Hall of Fame Inductees". Many members came and went, with many of those who left coming back, some on more than one occasion. Here are some of the members of the band.

1. Franco Luambo
2. Aime Kiwakana
3. Empompo Loway
4. Gerry Dialungana
5. Henri Bowane
6. Isaac Musekiwa
7. Jean Serge Essous
8. Josky Kiambukuta Londa
9. Lola Checain
10. Madilu System
11. Carlyto Lassa
12. Malage de Lugendo
13. Mayaula Mayoni
14. Michelino Mavatiku Visi
15. Michel Boyibanda (died October 2024)
16. Mose Fan Fan
17. Mpudi Decca
18. Ndombe Opetum
19. Papa Noel Nedule (died November 2024)
20. Philippe Lando Rossignol
21. Rondot Kassongo
22. Sam Mangwana
23. Saturnin Pandi
24. Simaro Lutumba
25. Kiamuangana Mateta
26. Vicky Longomba
27. Wuta Mayi
28. Youlou Mabiala
29. Zitani Dalienst Ya Ntesa
30. Albino Kalombo
31. Moniania Roitelet
32. Camille Feruzi
33. Céli Bitshou
34. De La Lune
35. Diatho Lukoki
36. Dizzy Madjeku
37. Djo Mpoyi
38. Djo Djo Ikomo
39. Edouard Lutula
40. Gege Mangaya
41. Hubert Dihunga Djeskin
42. Jean Malapet
43. Jean Tashamala Piccolo
44. Djeskin
45. Jeef Mingiedi
46. Johnny Bokelo
47. Kwamy Munsi
48. La Monta LiBerlin
49. Leon Bolhen Bombolo
50. Lunuma Mbemba
51. Matalanza
52. Mulamba Joseph Mujos
53. Nestor Diangani
54. Ngiandu Kanza
55. Nyoya Fwala
56. Paul Ebengo Dewayon
57. Pedro Dele
58. Thierry Mantuika Kobi
59. Adamo Seye Kadimoke
60. Alphone Epayo
61. Antoine Armando Brazzos
62. Baniel Bambo
63. Barami Miranda
64. Celestin Kouka
65. Christophe Djali
66. Edo Nganga
67. Flavien Makabi Mingini
68. Celi Bitchoumanou:
69. Georges Kiamuangana
70. Guillaume Mbembe
71. Jean-Felix Pouela
72. Jolie Detta
73. Kapitena Kasongo
74. Kiesse Diambu Ya Ntessa
75. Kongi Aska
76. Lassa Carlito
77. Makonko Kindudi Makos
78. Milanda Barami
79. Monogi Mopia
80. Mpongo Love
81. Nana Akumu
82. Bosuma Bakili Dessoin
83. Simon Moke
84. Tchandala Kosuana
85. Vieux Kalloux
86. Dénis Bonyeme
87. Lokombe Ntal
88. Toma Lema
89. Lunama Bemba
90. Kasongo wa Kasonga
91. Mpuku Mununi
92. Balami wa Mayani
93. Mpukulu wamunongo
94. Milanda Barami
95. Miyokoni wa Bilwolo
96. Zinga ya Bayulu
97. Coco Zuba
98. Lopua
99. Lolima Mama Leki
100. Yondo Nyota

== Discography ==
A small fraction of the hundreds of records and albums released by TPOK Jazz during the thirty-seven and a half years of the band's existence includes:

TPOK Jazz Discography June 1953 – December 1993
Year	Name of Record	Composer
1956	On Entre OK On Sort KO	François Luambo Makiadi
1962	Cheri Zozo	Makiadi
1965	Ngai Marie Nzoto Ebeba	Makiadi
1966	Chicotte	Makiadi
1969	Celine	Youlou Mabiala
1969	Marceline	Makiadi
1969	Mado	Céli Bitshou
1969	Je Ne Peux Faire Autrement (Ma Hele)	Simaro Lutumba
1970	Gaby Ozali Coupable	Lola Chécain
1970	Mokili Matata	Bitshou
1971	Georgette	Makiadi
1971	Radio Trottoir	Lutumba
1972	Dje Melasi	Mose Fan Fan
1972	Lufua Lua Nkadi	Sam Mangwana
1972	Zando Ya Tipo-Tipo	Michel Boyibanda
1973	AZDA	Makiadi
1973	Nganda Ma Campagne	Chécain
1973	Zando Ya Tipo-Tipo	Boyibanda
1973	Où Est le Sérieux?	Makiadi
1974	Luka Mobali Moko	Mangwana
1974	Kinzonzi Ki Tata Mbemba	Makiadi
1974	Mabele	Lutumba
1974	Monzo	Josky Kiambukuta
1975	Baninga Tokola Na Balingaka Ngai Te	Chécain
1975	Bomba Bomba Mabe	Makiadi
1975	Bondowe	Mayaula Mayoni
1975	Alimatou	Makiadi
1975	Bisalela	Lutumba
1975	Bodutaka	Lutumba
1975	Camarade Nini Akobomba Ngai Sango	Makiadi
1975	Kamikaze	Mabiala
1975	Ledi	Mabiala
1975	Falaswa	Makiadi
1975	Nakoma Mbanda Na Mama Ya Mobali Ngai	Makiadi
1975	Nioka Abangaka Mpe Moto	Makiadi
1975	Mbongo	Lutumba
1975	TP OK Jazz Presence Na Ngai	Lutumba
1975	Oko Regretter Ngai Mama	Lutumba
1975	Toboyana Kaka	Chécain
1975	Nioka Abangaka Mpe Moto	Makiadi
1976	Bokolo Bana Ya Mbanda Na Yo Malamu	Makiadi
1976	Liberté	Makiadi
1976	Tosambi Bapeji Yo Raison Na Quartier	Makiadi
1977	Lisolo Ya Adamo Na Nzambe	Daniel Zitan Ya Ntesa
1977	Mabe Yo Mabe	Ndombe Opetum
1977	Sala Lokola Luntadila	Chécain
1977	Libala Ya Bana Na Bana	Chécain
1978	Nabali Misele	Mayoni
1980	Tokoma Ba Camarade Pamba	Makiadi
1980	Arzoni	Makiadi
1980	Mamba	Lutumba
1981	Bina na Ngai na Respect	Zitan
1982	Farceur	Makiadi
1982	Faute Ya Commerçant	Lutumba
1982	Tangawusi	Papa Noel Nedule
1983	Missile	Josky Kiambukuta
1983	Non	Makiadi
1983	Tu Vois? (Mamou)	Makiadi
1984	Makambo Ezali Bourreau	Makiadi
1984	12,600 Letters to Franco	Makiadi
1984	Candidat Na Biso Mobutu	Makiadi
1985	Bourreau des Cœurs	Dénis Bonyeme
1985	Mario	Makiadi
1985	Boma Ngai Na Boma Yo To Bomana	Madilu System
1986	Celio	Makiadi
1986	Testament Ya Bowule	Lutumba
1987	Attention Na Sida	Makiadi

== See also ==
- African Rumba
- Music of the Democratic Republic of the Congo
- Francois Luambo Makiadi
