= Linzolo =

- Location in the Republic of the Congo
- Coordinates: 4°24′49″S 15°6′25″E
- Country: Republic of the Congo
- Department: Pool
- District: Goma Tsé-Tsé

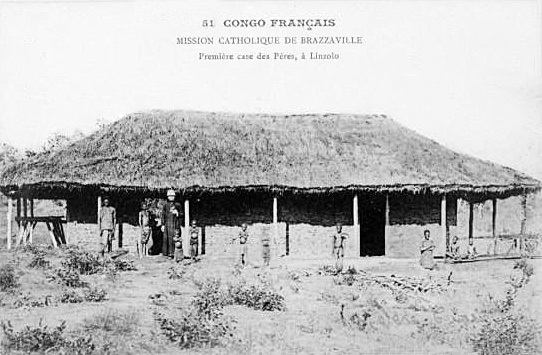
Catholic Mission of Brazzaville: first hut of the Fathers, in Linzolo. 1907

Linzolo is a small town and suburb located 20 km southwest of Brazzaville on the Cataractes plateau in the Pool Department of the Republic of Congo.

== History ==
The town of Linzolo was the chosen site between 1881 and 1883 for the founding of the oldest Catholic Mission in the Congo with that of Loango. The Mission of Linzolo was created on September 22, 1883, and the chapel completed in 1885. It was the oldest building in the country, but was unfortunately heavily damaged by fire in 1997-1998 civil war. It has been restored a few years later. A modern chapel with carved reliefs, built in 1983, completes the area.
