= Sonodisc =

French record label

SonoDisc
- Founded: 1970
- Founder: Marcel Perse and Michel David
- Defunct: 2005
- Genre: Various
- Country of origin: France
- Location: 15th arrondissement of Paris
- Official website: SonoDisc

Sonodisc (a contraction for Société nouvelle de distribution de disques), or simply spelled SonoDisc, was a French record label established in 1970 by former Ngoma's staff members Marcel Perse and Michel David in Paris. It was one of the most prominent record labels in the 1970s. It distributed albums and cassette tapes from the Democratic Republic of the Congo, Ivory Coast, Cameroon, Egypt, Algeria, the Republic of the Congo, the Caribbean, Armenia, Tahiti, India, Latin America, Italy, and other overseas territories.

== History ==
Following their departure from the Ngoma record label, Perse and David leveraged their contacts and recordings to distribute Umm Kalthum compositions, as well as labels featuring artists from the Caribbean, Latin America, and several African labels including Syliphone from Guinea and Francis Bebey's Disques. The label established its African subsidiary Sonafric, in 1972, followed by Disques Espérance in 1974. In the mid-1970s and 1980s, they augmented their catalog, distributing salsa, Armenian, Tahitian, Indian, and other international music.

In 1981, the label acquired Fonior's African catalog after it went bankrupt. The label persisted in distributing albums for many African labels, including Franco Luambo's Edipop, CHOC, Le Passeport, and African Sun Music labels, Tabu Ley's Genidia label, and the Cameroonian Ebobolo Fia label. Sonafric predominantly tracks licensed from African sources, interspersed with independent productions. SonoDisc also procured some of Ngoma's albums after the discontinuation of the original Ngoma label in France in 1971, subsequently reintroducing them under the Sonafric label. With the emergence of a change in format from vinyl to CD albums, new albums were released in both formats, as well as in the form of pre-recorded cassettes. Fonior's album series on the African label was first supplemented with 28 new vinyl albums with Congolese music. Between 1991 and 1998, SonoDisc transmuted the entire Congolese vinyl catalog into 103 CDs within the African label in the 36, 500 series.

In 1994, Marcel Perse expressed concerns about the decline in revenues in Africa because of rampant cassette piracy. SonoDisc later merged with the Musisoft Next Group. However, the company faced financial insolvency in 2005, leading to its acquisition by The Adageo Group, specifically, Suave Music/Redbay. In 2011, the company changed its name to The Sonodisc Group and went online with a website in 2012. In 2015, the Africa Seven label was launched, and after the owner's death in 2017, the company shifted to a licensing company for re-releases.

== Artists distributed ==
With an extensive repertoire of several thousand titles, SonoDisc played a pivotal role in launching the careers of several music artists who later signed record deals with prominent record labels. Some of the most notable musicians whose albums were distributed by SonoDisc include:

- Afia Mala
- Alain Makaba
- Amadou & Mariam
- Ali Farka Touré
- Ali Baba
- Lounis Aït Menguellet
- Alain Malespine
- Axel Vitalien
- Baba Djan
- Battery Cremil
- Bembeya Jazz National
- Charles Maurinier
- Cheikh Lô
- Cortex
- Decibel
- Decimus
- Denis Kiayilouca
- Desi Mbwese
- Dino Vangu
- Nicolas Kasanda wa Mikalay
- Edith Lefel
- ENERGY
- Eric Virgal
- Farhat Jouini
- Fay Man
- Franck Balustre
- Franck Issekya
- Franco Luambo & TPOK Jazz
- Franklin Boukaka
- Frantzi
- Frederic Losio And Co
- Général Defao and Choc Stars
- Geoffrey Oryema
- Georges Lupot
- Jo Riko
- Georges Plonquitte
- Gloria Tukhadio
- Grand Kallé & L’African Jazz
- Guerdy
- Guilou
- Ibro Diabate
- Imgart Manigat
- Jacob Desvarieux
- Janick Voyer
- JEAN 3.16
- Jean-Jacques Gaston
- Jean-Michel Cabrimol
- Jean-Michel Rotin
- Jean-Paul Pognon
- Jocelyne Labylle
- Jocelyne Mathias
- Joël Grédoire/Geant's
- Johnny Bokelo
- Kassav'
- Koffi Olomide
- Kristal'
- La Relève Du T.P OK Jazz
- Le Groupe Suave
- Les Bantous De La Capitale
- Louis M’Bomio
- Lutchiana
- Lydia Lawrence
- Maika Munan
- Malavoi
- Marc Chery
- Marius Cultier
- Mayaula Mayoni
- Miriam Makeba
- Modogo Gian Franco Ferre
- Mohamed Khaznadji
- Mory Kanté
- Nando Da Cruz
- Nayanka Bell
- Néné Tchakou
- Nestor Azerot
- Ngouma Lokito
- Nikhil Banerjee
- NIPA
- Noël McGhie & Space Spies
- Nouvelle Generation De La République Démocratique Du Congo
- Pamélo Mounka
- Papa Wemba
- Parveen Sultana
- Dilshad Khan
