= Johnny Bokelo =

Congolese musician (1939–1995)

- Born: Jean Bokelo Isenge; 1939 (Note: Sources disagree on both the year and place of birth. Afrisson gives 1939, in Boyamba, Bandundu. The Congolese blog Kin Kiesse gives 1940, in Léopoldville (Kinshasa).); Boyamba, Bandundu Province, Belgian Congo
- Died: January 15, 1995 Kinshasa, Zaire
- Genres: Congolese rumba, soukous
- Occupations: Singer, guitarist, bandleader
- Years active: 1958–1995
- Formerly of: Franco Luambo and OK Jazz; Conga Jazz; Orchestre Cobantou

Jean "Johnny" Bokelo Isenge (1939 – January 15, 1995) was a Congolese guitarist, singer, and bandleader, best known as the founder of Orchestre Conga Succès. He began his career playing guitar as a teenager alongside Franco Luambo in a group led by his older brother, Paul "Dewayon" Ebengo. Bokelo went on to play with Franco in OK Jazz before founding his own group.

== Life and career ==
Bokelo formed his group, later known as Orchestre Conga Succès, in 1958. His brother Dewayon joined the band in 1960, and by 1964 the group, which also included musicians such as José Lohota, Don Pierrot, and Mombembe, had reached the height of its popularity. In 1968, Bokelo renamed the group Conga 68 and established his own record label named Éditions Landa Bango.

In the early 1970s, Bokelo spent most of his time running his recording studio. As conditions at Kinshasa's manufacturing facilities deteriorated in the second half of the 1970s, he was among the producers who traveled to Nairobi to press records for re-import to Zaire, blaming the Belgian company Fonior, which controlled the country's only pressing plant, MAZADIS, for the crisis.

Bokelo's music was known for a fast, sharply arranged style of rumba with prominent guitar work, and critics have frequently compared his output to that of his contemporary Franco. He recorded extensively for the L'Afrique Danse compilation series in the late 1960s, appearing alongside Franco on L'Afrique Danse No. 1 and leading his own session on L'Afrique Danse No. 7. Reviewing a reissue of L'Afrique Danse No. 1 in 2026, critic Robert Christgau gave the album an A+, writing that Bokelo was "somewhat more lyrical" and "somewhat more exciting" than Franco, and calling the record "a superb and if you like this stuff irresistible sampler of Congolese pop."

Bokelo continued recording and performing into the 1980s and was known in the Democratic Republic of the Congo for his fluency in Lingala and for songs promoting traditional Congolese values. He died on January 15, 1995 in Kinshasa.

== Discography (selected) ==
- L'Afrique Danse No. 7 (1969, African) — with Dewayon and Orchestre Cobantou
- Au revoir 81 Vol. 1: M'Bongo = L'argent (1981)
- Johnny Bokelo: Tout Ça C'Est La Vie (1982)
- Sakina (1982)
