= Gombe-Matadi =

- Location in Democratic Republic of the Congo
- Coordinates: 5°1′31″S 14°51′15″E
- Country: Democratic Republic of the Congo
- Province: Kongo Central

Gombe-Matadi is a community in Kongo Central Province, Democratic Republic of the Congo.

In 1943, Belgian catholic missionary Marc Wallenda created an art school in Gombe-Matadi. In 1949 the school moved to Kinshasa.
