= Vicky Longomba =

Congolese musician (1932–1988)

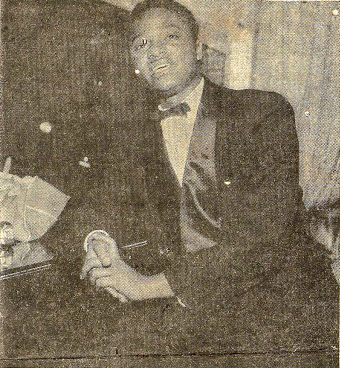
- Longomba in 1960
- Born: Victor Longomba Besange Lokuli; 23 December 1932; Léopoldville, Democratic Republic of the Congo
- Died: 12 March 1988 (aged 55); Kinshasa, Democratic Republic of the Congo
- Occupation: Singer
- Children: inc. Awilo Longomba

Victor Longomba Besange Lokuli, commonly known as Vicky Longomba (23 December 1932 – 12 March 1988), was a Congolese singer.

Born in Léopoldville, present-day Kinshasa, in the Democratic Republic of the Congo, he was a founding member of Tout puissant OK Jazz, a Congolese rumba group.

He later formed his own group, Lovy du Zaire. He was the father of Lovy Longomba (member of Super Mazembe) and Awilo Longomba, both popular musicians.

He died in Kinshasa on 12 March 1988, aged 55.
