= Wuta Mayi =

- Also known as: Gaspard Wuta, Paschal Gaspard Mayi, Blaise Pasco
- Born: Gaspard Wuta Mayi; 9 August 1949 (age 76); Kinshasa, Democratic Republic of the Congo
- Origin: Congolese
- Genres: Congolese rumba
- Occupations: Singer; songwriter
- Instrument: Vocals
- Years active: 1968–2011

Gaspard Wuta Mayi (born 9 August 1949) is a Congolese rumba and soukous vocalist and composer. From 1974 to 1982, he was a member of the band TPOK Jazz, led by Franco Luambo, which dominated the Congolese music scene from the 1960s through the 1980s. Since leaving TPOK Jazz he has recorded and performed as a solo artist, in addition to being one of the four members of the "supergroup" Les Quatre Etoiles (The Four Stars), and subsequently a member of Kékélé.

== Background ==
Wuta Mayi was born on 9 August 1949 at Leopold General Hospital in then Leopoldville, now Kinshasa, the capital of, and largest city in, what was then the Belgian Congo, was later (among other names) Zaire, and is now the Democratic Republic of the Congo.

This singer has been known by a variety of names; one source notes that "Gaspard Wuta Mayi is also known as Gaspard Wuta, Paschal Gaspard Mayi, Wuta Mayandi Yundula and Blaise Pasco." He was given the name Gaspard soon after birth. (Note: One source states, inconsistently with those cited, that his birth name was Blaise Pasco Mayanda, but it seems less authoritative than other sources including interviews. Eyre, Banning (27 September 2019). "La Face Cachée (review)". Afropop Worldwide.) Later as a child, the name "Pascal" was added, after his maternal grandfather Pascal Gaspard Mayandi. During 1967-68, while he was with Orchestre Jamel National, a member of his family who had studied in Europe nicknamed him "Blaise" to make him "Blaise Pascal," and from then on he was known as "Blaise-Pasco." Around 1974, at about the time he joined TPOK Jazz, under Zaire's "authenticité" campaign under President Mobutu, he changed his name to the more "authentic" Congolese name Wata Undula Mayanda (or Wuta Mayandi Yundula), known as Wuta Mayi. In any event, he has recorded and performed since the 1970s under the name Wuta Mayi, although sometimes that name is hyphenated and some of his solo album covers spell it as "Wuta May."

He went to school in Kinshasa, studying at Josephine Charlotte School for his elementary education, continuing on to the Saint Andre commercial technical school in the city's Limete commune, and doing part of his high school education at the Athenaeum of Ngiri-Ngiri.

In 1967, at the age of 18, while still a student, he joined the band Orchestre Jamel National, previously known as Jamel Jazz, based in the commune of Dendal. He became friends with another vocalist in the band, Aime Kiwakana, born Emmanuel Kiala, who would later join TPOK Jazz. Other musicians who made their start at Jamel included saxophonist Empompo Loway (also later with TPOK Jazz), guitarists Bavon "Marie-Marie" (the only brother of Franco Luambo), Makosso, and Dave Makondele, and vocalists Djo Mpoyi (later with TPOK Jazz), Marcel "Djeskain" Loko, Bumba Massa, and Jean-Papy Ramazani (the latter three of whom would join Wuta Mayi in Kékélé, decades later).

== Musical career ==
=== Early professional career (1968–1974) ===
Wuta Mayi began his professional career in 1968, joining the band Orchestre Bamboula as a vocalist. The band was created in November of that year by guitarist Papa Noël (Antoine or Anthony Nedule). Another member was guitarist Paul Mansiamina Mfoko, or Bopol. Bopol was the same age as Wuta Mayi, having been born in Leopoldville on July 26, 1949, and both were then beginning their professional musical careers after high school. This was the start of a decades-long collaborative musical relationship between the two. Other band members included other vocalists Aime Kiwakana, Pires, and Tino Mwinkwa, Jeff Lunam on saxophone, and Mangenza on drums, as well as Madilu System, Pepe Kalle and Bozi Boziana. Orchestre Bamboula made its official debut in February 1969 in the town of Limete. That same year, Orchestre Bamboula was chosen, by winning a competition among the country's top bands, to represent the Democratic Republic of the Congo in the first Pan-African Festival of Culture in Algiers, Algeria. The band known as Bantous de la Capitale represented the Republic of the Congo (Congo-Brazzaville). Orchestre Bamboula broke up, however, shortly after its return from Algiers.

He was later a member of several other bands, including Rock'a Mambo and Orchestre Continentale. He formed the latter band in 1971 with Bopol and Tino Mwinkwa from Bamboula, as well as other musicians including Josky Kiambukuta and "Serpent" Kabamba.

=== With TPOK Jazz (1974–1982) ===
In 1974, Wuta Mayi left Orcheste Continental to join TPOK Jazz, after an invitation relayed through Josky Kiambukuta. Wuta Mayi played with TPOK Jazz until 1982, leaving before Franco's death in 1989.

Other vocalists in TPOK Jazz at that time included Josky Kiambukuta, Michel Boyibanda, Youlou Mabiala, Ndombe Opetum and Aime Kiwakana. Wuta Mayi is credited to have composed a number of songs for TPOK Jazz during his eight-year tenure there, including Melou (1975), Basala la vie (1978), Ayant Droit (1980), Moleka, Beyou (1980), and Tuti (1981).

=== As a solo artist, and with Les Quatre Etoiles and other groups (1982–present) ===
In 1982, Wuta Mayi needed to come to Paris for medical treatment. He decided to stay there after three friends from Kinshasa who had moved to Paris, Bopol, Nyboma, and Syran Mbenza, invited him to record with them. In 1982 they recorded, 4 Grandes Vedettes de la Musique Africaine, which was issued in 1983 and would later be seen as the first record of the group they formed, Les Quatre Etoiles (the Four Stars).

Between then and 1993, in addition to recording and performing with Les Quatre Etoiles, he released six solo albums, as well as one credited to him and Congolese guitarist Dino Vangu (listed as "Dino Vangou"). He also contributed to many other records.

In the mid 1990s, with Papa Noël, Bopol and others, he formed the band Odemba. However the band failed to fully launch due to lack of funds.

In the early 2000s, Wuta Mayi, Nyboma, Syran Mbenza, Djeskain Loko Massengo, Sammy Bumba Massa, Papa Noël, and Jean-Papy Ramazani formed a band called Kékélé that toured extensively in Europe and North America. Kékélé means "vines that are used in villages in Africa to make connections". The band plays entirely using acoustic guitars, drums and percussions.

In 2019, more than 25 years after his previous solo release and more than 50 years after beginning his professional musical career, Wuta Mayi issued a new solo album, La Face Cachee, which received positive reviews.

== Discography ==
(his name is sometimes spelled "Wuta May", and sometimes hyphenated, on record and CD covers)

- Le Beach (Eddy'Son 79419) (1982)
- Dino Vangou et Wuta May – Cheque Sans Provision (or Kina-Rama Presente Dino Vangou a La Guitare et Wuta May Au Chant Dans Cheque sans Provision) (1982)
- Wuta May (Kino-Rama KRLP 1003) (1983)
- Zalaka Mayele (1983)
- Ole La Vie (Eddy'Son 79427) (1983)
- Tout Mal Se Paie Ici Bas (1984)
- Blaise Pasco Chante Saka Mache (1993)
- La Face Cachee (2019)
