= Mose Se Sengo =

Papa Lolo songCongolese musician

- Also known as: Mose Fan Fan
- Born: Mose Se Sengo; 16 October 1945; Léopoldville, Belgian Congo (now Kinshasa, Democratic Republic of the Congo)
- Died: 3 May 2019 (aged 73) Nairobi, Kenya
- Genre: Congo music
- Occupations: composer, guitarist, band leader
- Instrument: Solo guitar
- Years active: 1960 – 2019

Mose Se Sengo ("Fan Fan") (16 October 1945 – 3 May 2019) was a guitarist, composer and band-leader from the Democratic Republic of Congo. He was one of the pioneers of Congolese Soukous.

== Background ==
Mose Se Sengo, was born in present-day Kinshasa, Democratic Republic of the Congo, on 16 October 1945. He began to play the guitar at boarding school in Kinanga.

== Music career ==
He played with Franco and TPOK Jazz, which he joined in 1968. He later joined the band Lovy du Zaire, formed in 1971 or 1972 by Victor "Vicky" Longomba, who was previously a co-founder of OK Jazz and afterward a member of African Jazz. Other later-famous musicians in Lovy du Zaire included Bumba Massa, Youlou Mabiala and Syran Mbenza. According to one source, however, he "could not tolerate the leader's hypocrisy and soon quit."

In 1974, he traveled from Zaire to East Africa, first settling in Tanzania for several years. In the late 1970s, he formed a new version of his band Somo Somo, roughly translated Double Trouble, performing in the Lingala language. The band performed in Tanzania, Zambia and Kenya. In the early 1980s he moved to Kenya, where he re-formed Somo Somo and recorded several albums. In 1983 "Fan Fan" arrived in London, England mixing his music with English jazz musicians.

In the 1990s he joined Bana OK, a tribute band to the late Franco Luambo Makiadi of TPOK Jazz. By 2000, "Fan Fan" had returned to the roots of the Acoustic Rumba style. As of the early 2010s, he was resident in London and had acquired British citizenship by the time of his death.

== Death ==
On 3 May 2019, Mose Se Sengo was on a routine recording tour in Nairobi, Kenya, when he collapsed and died following a suspected heart attack. Fan Fan, who was staying at an apartment on Thika Superhighway, was taken to a Kasarani Hospital within Nairobi, where he was pronounced dead on arrival.

The musician's producer, Tabu Osusa, said Fan Fan was in the city recording a new song with vocalists based in Nairobi including Paddy Makani and Disco Longwa. Mose Fan Fan, whose residence was in London, loved Nairobi and had been visiting Kenya consistently since 2016. His death came a day before the burial of another Congolese musician of his era, Lutumba SImaro, with whom they had played together in the TPOK Jazz band. Plans are underway, as of 11 May 2019, to repatriate his remains to the United Kingdom for final interment.

== Discography ==
Albums

- 1975: Dje Melasi with TPOK Jazz
- 1994: Belle Epoque
- 1995 Hello Hello
- 1999: Congo Acoustic
- 2005: Bayekeleye
- 2011: Musicatelama

Contributing artist

- 2000: Unwired: Africa (World Music Network)
