= Youlou Mabiala =

Congolese musician (born 1947)

- Also known as: Gilbert Youlou Mabiala
- Born: Youlou Mabiala; 6 March 1947 (age 79); Linzolo, Brazzaville
- Genres: Congolese rumba; soukous
- Occupations: Singer-songwriter; guitarist; bandleader
- Instruments: Vocals, guitars
- Years active: Early 1960s–present
- Labels: MX; Tchi Tchi; Edipop Production; Associated Sound Limited; Musiclub; Industrie Africaine Du Disque; Kadance; Publi-Son; Apia; Rythmes Et Musique; Editions FrancAfrique; Disco Mabele; Discques NM; Bade Stars Music; New King Productions; Flash Diffusion Business; DonoDisc; Editions Vévé International; Édition Rumbayas; Moninga Star; Édition Isse; Emmbo; Parions-Congo; Disques NM; Glenn Music
- Formerly of: TPOK Jazz; Lovy du Zaïre; Somo Somo; Orchestre Les Trois Frères; Rumbayas; Kamikaze Loningisa

Gilbert Youlou Mabiala (born 6 March 1947), known professionally as Prince Youlou, is a Congolese singer-songwriter, and guitarist. Known for his high-pitched voice, he is regarded as one of the significant figures of Congolese rumba. He began his musical career in 1962 with the Brazzaville vocal group Les Griots and, in 1963, joined the vocal club Les Mains Blanches.

Youlou rose to prominence in 1966 after he became a member of the Kinshasa-based band TPOK Jazz, led by Franco Luambo and Vicky Longomba. Within a short time, he established himself as one of Kinshasa's leading songwriters, with hits such as "Numéro Ya Kinshasa", "Dodo Tuna Motema", "Nakopesa Yo Motema", and "Billy Ya Ba Fiancées". In 1972, he joined Lovy du Zaïre, the band led by Vicky Longomba, before co-founding Somo Somo in 1974 with Jean Kwamy Munsi. He returned to TPOK Jazz in 1976 and composed the hit "Kamikaze" for the band's twentieth-anniversary double album. The following year, he left TPOK Jazz alongside Michel Boyibanda and, with Marcel Loko Massengo "Djeskain", founded Orchestre Les Trois Frères in Brazzaville. The band achieved immediate success with "Petit Chéri", "Saley", "Nenette", and "Diallo".

In 1980, Youlou founded his own band, Kamikaze Loningisa, which produced hits like "Je suis encore jeune", "Satan", "Seli Go", "Le corps refuse", "Nsona", "Lili", and "Maka". Despite leading his own band, he maintained cordial relations with Franco Luambo and occasionally collaborated with TPOK Jazz. Following Franco's death in 1989, the dissolution of TPOK Jazz in 1993, and the creation of Bana OK by Simaro Lutumba in 1994, Franco's family entrusted Youlou with reviving TPOK Jazz. Appointed bandleader in December 1996, he positioned himself as a principal guardian of Franco's musical legacy. Albums released under the revived TPOK Jazz included Oleli, Oleli (1997), La Relève (1997), Infraction (1998), and Le Verdict (2000).

== Life and career ==
=== 1947–June 1977: Early life, TPOK Jazz, Lovy du Zaïre, and Somo Somo ===
Gilbert Youlou Mabiala was born on 6 March 1947 in Linzolo, a suburb of Brazzaville in what was then French Equatorial Africa (now the Republic of the Congo). He began his education at the mixed school of Poto-Poto (École mixte de Poto-Poto) in 1954 and developed an early love for singing at the Catholic Church. In 1963, he joined a vocal club called Les Mains Blanches, whose performances were broadcast on national radio. Before that, in 1962, he had spent seven months with the vocal group Les Griots of Brazzaville, which marked the beginning of his musical career.

In 1966, Franco Luambo's TPOK Jazz faced a major crisis when numerous dissatisfied musicians defected, leaving him with only his co-bandleader Vicky Longomba. Around the same time, Franco was briefly arrested by President Mobutu Sese Seko's secret police for performing "Luvumbu Ndoki" ("Luvumbu the Sorcerer"), which authorities viewed as a form of criticism of Mobutu. After his release, Franco sought refuge in Brazzaville. To rebuild the weakened TPOK Jazz, he recruited the teenage Youlou along with two other musicians, including bassist Celi Bitchoumanou, also known as Celi Bitchou. On 13 August 1966, Youlou made his debut in Kinshasa at a landmark concert at the Cosbaki (Bandal-Kintambo Sports Complex). Under Simaro Lutumba's mentorship, he initially struggled to adapt to the stringent demands of TPOK Jazz, as he was accustomed to choir-style singing. Vicky required twelve hours of rehearsal over two days to get him up to speed. In 1966, Youlou wrote his first love songs, "Obimi Mbwe" and "Babotoli Ngai Yo", released on Franco's Epanza Makita label. The following year, under Franco's Boma Bango label, he released "Mpungu Ya Bolingo" and "Nakoluka Yo Ba Nzela Nioso", while his first smash hit, "Numéro Ya Kinshasa", along with "Dodo Tuna Motema", came out on Vicky's Viclong label. Later successes, including "Nakopesa Yo Motema" and "Billy Ya Ba Fiancées" on Verckys Kiamuangana Mateta's Éditions Vévé International label, captured the romantic life of Kinshasa couples.

Youlou quickly established himself as one of Kinshasa's leading songwriters and composers. In 1972, Youlou, Sam Mangwana, Lola Checain, and Michel Boyibanda formed TPOK Jazz's vocal section. Equally at ease in the band's animated rumba odemba style, he developed a distinctive vocal identity whose polished yet powerful timbre recalled that of former TPOK Jazz and Rock-a-Mambo vocalist Philippe Lando Rossignol. That same year, Vicky founded the band Lovy du Zaïre, which included Youlou alongside Celi Bitsou and Mose Se Sengo, another TPOK Jazz defector. Franco responded with the song-diatribe "Où est le sérieux", targeting Youlou, Fanfan, and Bitsou for leaving him. After a falling out with Vicky, Youlou established Somo Somo in 1974 with Jean Kwamy Munsi and recruited Diatho Lukoki on vocals, Djuke on lead guitar, Master on bass, and Nona on tumba. They toured Kisangani for two months. In 1976, Youlou rejoined TPOK Jazz and composed the hit "Kamikaze" for the band's 20th-anniversary double album. In June 1977, accompanied by TPOK Jazz, he released "Vive Cmp", a song honoring the Military Committee of the Party (Comité Militaire du Parti; CMP), led by Commander Joachim Yhombi-Opango, which oversaw the transition after President Marien Ngouabi's death.

=== May 1977–1979: Orchestre Les Trois Frères and Rumbayas ===
In May 1977, Youlou and Michel left TPOK Jazz. Thanks to their work for the CMP, the group received financial support from President Yhombi-Opango to purchase musical equipment. Along with Marcel Loko Massengo "Djeskain", they founded the band Orchestré Les Trois Frères, also known as International Rumbayas des Trois Frères, in Brazzaville. Their debut performance took place on 7 August 1977 at the Ciné Vog in downtown Brazzaville, with accompaniment by the band Super Boboto (SBB). The choir was provided by Evelyne Ngongolo and Emille Maimouna Berete of the "Amies Cadettes". Michel, who had joined Les Bantous de la Capitale during rehearsals, did not participate in this first show. Orchestré Les Trois Frères was composed of Denis, Toussaint Loussala, and Djaffar Loubamba on guitars; Dupool on tumbas; Franck Nkodia, Roger, Zinga, and Augustin in the brass section; and dancers Yelessa Antoinette, Yolanda, Adèle, and Aziza under the direction of Sonnery. By 1978, their repertoire included new songs such as Youlou's "Petit Chéri" and "Saley", Loko Massengo's "Nenette", and Michel's "Diallo". Orchestré Les Trois Frères' success was immediate, and their music quickly reached a wide audience.

In April 1979, Youlou founded the band Rumbayas and performed at the Expérimental Show, which was directed by Mfumu Fylla Saint-Eudes. He played acoustic guitar, accompanied by Dercy Mandiangu (formerly of Orchestré Sosoliso) on lead guitar, Djaffar Loubamba on bass, Mick on drums, Franck Nkodia on saxophone, and Zinga and Augustin on trumpet, while Jeff Munongo coordinated choreography. This performance laid the foundation for what would later become Kamikaze Loningisa, with Serge Lemvo Kiambukuta and Wawa making their debuts. During this period, Youlou released songs such as "Hélène" and "Barika".

During this time, Youlou became known as a musical foil to Franco. He often composed songs in response to Franco's releases, frequently mirroring the original titles. For example, Youlou's "Hélène" was composed as an answer to Franco's song of the same name, a pattern he repeated with "Mamou".

=== 1980–1996: Kamikaze Loningisa and later years ===
After leaving International Rumbayas des Trois Frères, he founded his own band, Kamikaze Loningisa, in 1980. The band featured Youlou alongside singers Serge Lemo Kiambukuta, Sele, Bola Bolith, Pindu, and Miguel. The instrumentalists included lead guitarists Souza Vangu and Dercy Mandiangu, rhythm guitarist Kiala Don Joli, bassist Djaffar Loumbamba, drummer and tumbas player Lilas Simon Nona, and brass players Iblo, Jeff, Zinga, and Augustin. Sponsored by Publi-Congo, Kamikaze Loningisa made its official debut on 28 August 1981 at Ciné Vog before a packed audience, with Mfumu Fylla Saint-Eudes serving as master of ceremonies. Key organizers included Roger Edouard Okoula, general director of Publi-Congo, along with Nkala Lambi, Tchikonkolo, and Guy Bandio.

During its early years, the band released several hits, including "Je suis encore jeune", "Satan", "Seli Go", "Le corps refuse", "Nsona", and "Lili". In 1983, Youlou released "Maka", which dominated music charts in Brazzaville and Kinshasa. The following year, he responded to Franco with the song "Mamou", which echoes Franco's original title. In 1986, through the collaboration of Miab Miambanzila, Pamélo Mounka, and Youlou, the album Lisanga Ya Ba Ndoki was released through Disques NM, inspired by the 1983 album Lisanga Ya Ba Nganga by Tabu Ley Rochereau and Franco. Pamélo Mounka contributed a standout narrative track titled "Atipo", while Youlou's "Loufoulakari" became the biggest hit of the year across Pool Malebo. He also scored another hit that year with "Mon Avocat a Voyagé".

Despite leading his own band, Youlou maintained a cordial rapport with Franco and occasionally rejoined TPOK Jazz for recording sessions. For instance, in 1987, he participated in revisiting past TPOK Jazz hits, including his own composition "Vyckina". In 1991, he collaborated with Josky Kiambukuta on the six-track album Dona Beija. Alongside Michelino Mavatiku Visi, Ntesa Dalienst, and Wuta Mayi, he formed a studio band called Afri-Jazz, which produced a single album, Frappe Aerienne Chirurgicale, in 1995.

Following Franco's death on 12 October 1989, the eventual breakup of TPOK Jazz in 1993, and the formation of Bana OK in 1994 by Simaro Lutumba, who recruited nearly all former TPOK Jazz members except Madilu System, uncertainty arose within Franco's biological family, which, determined to safeguard his legacy, entrusted Youlou with reviving TPOK Jazz during an official ceremony on 24 December 1996 and appointed him as bandleader. He positioned himself as the most devoted guardian of Franco's heritage, regarded as his creative "heir". That same year, he released the SonoDisc-produced album Mwana ya Luambo, whose eponymous track reportedly disgruntled Simaro, who viewed its message as a personal slight. Subsequent albums released under the revival TPOK Jazz banner included Oleli, Oleli (1997), La Releve (1997), Infraction (1998), and Le Verdict (2000). Notable songs from this period include "Qui cherche qui?", "Pourquoi moi", "Coup fort", "Métamorphose", "Bina Luambo", "Dilay", "Petit frère", "Okassone", and "Michina". On 15 August 2004, during celebrations marking the 44th anniversary of Congo's independence in Pointe-Noire, Youlou was honored for his contributions to music but tragically suffered a cerebral vascular accident during the grand concert. This significant event, attended by musicians from multiple bands and presided over by the highest dignitaries of both Congo and Gabon, including the two presidents, ultimately marked the end of his career, after which he largely faded from the music scene. On 15 August 2005, he was admitted to Loandjili Hospital in Pointe-Noire and later transferred to the University Hospital of Brazzaville's neurology department. He eventually pursued further treatment in Paris, where he remained for nearly two decades. After nineteen consecutive years abroad for medical care, he returned to Brazzaville on 25 June 2023. When interviewed by Les Dépêches de Brazzaville on 2 July, he was still facing minor speech challenges but was steadily improving. His younger brother, Jean-Baptiste Nganga, affirmed that his contentment comes from observing his son, Audy Youlou Mabiala, carry forward his legacy. During his stay in Brazzaville, Youlou formally appointed his son as his successor and president of Kamikaze Loningisa at the Concert de relance des activités de l'orchestre Kamikaze Loningisa ("Kamikaze Loningisa Orchestra Relaunch Concert"), which was held two weeks later at the La Détente bar in Bacongo.

== Personal life ==
Youlou married Hélène Luambo, one of the late Franco Luambo's daughters, widely known as Mama Leni. According to Youlou, it was Franco who gave him the sobriquet "Le Prince".

== Discography ==
Selected discography
Title	Year	Label	Remarks
Side A: "Cardiaque"; Side B: "Pension Na Bandalungwa"	1971	Produced by – Editions Populaires; Distributed by – Fiesta (7); Series: Editions Populaires (Fiesta)	Vinyl – with TPOK Jazz
Side A: "Nzube Oleka Te"; Side B: "Motema Na Yo Retroviseur"	1972	Produced by – Editions Populaires; Distributed by – Fiesta (7)	Vinyl – with TPOK Jazz
Side A: "Lema 1"; Side B: "Lema 2"	1976	Produced by – Editions Somo Somo; Label: Afro-Disc; Distributed by – Soul Posters	Vinyl – with Somo Somo
Side A: "Boni Nkaka 1"; Side B: "Boni Nkaka 2"	1977	Label: Soneca Zaïre (Democratic Republic of the Congo; Label: African (France); Series: Editions Populaires	Vinyl – with TPOK Jazz
Side A: "Papy Pt. I"; Side B: "Papy Pt. II"	1977	Label: Mamaki	Vinyl
Side A: "Petit Cheri (1)"; Side B: "Petit Cheri (2)"	1978	Label: ISSE (Democratic Republic of the Congo; Label: African (France)	Vinyl – with Orchestre Les Trois Frères
Side A: "Saley (1)"; Side B: "Saley (2)"	1978	Label: Édition Rumbayas	Vinyl – with Orchestre Les Trois Frères
Youlou	1978	Produced by – MX	LP
Side A: "Midi (1)"; Side B: "Midi (2)"	1979	Label: Moninga Star	Vinyl – with Orchestre Les Trois Frères
Lili Et Nsona (Live In Miguel "Casse Coup")	1981	Tchi Tchi (France); Editions D'Ivoire (Kenya)	LP
Keba Na Matraque	1981	Label: Edipop Production; Producer: Franco Luambo	LP – with TPOK Jazz
Lily	1982	Label – Associated Sound Limited (ASL)	LP – with Kamikaze Loningisa
Bolongwa Na Nzela	1982	Label – Edipop Production	LP – with Kamikaze Loningisa
Sentimental	1983	Label: Voix D'Afrique (2)	LP – with Kamikaze Loningisa
Moto Atikali Sima Mwasi Na Ligorodo	1983	Label: Musiclub; Rights society: SACEM	LP
Judoka	1983	Label: I.A.D. (Industrie Africaine Du Disque)	LP – with Kamikaze Loningisa
100% De Pourcentage	1983	Label: Kadance; Marketed by Eddy'son Consortium Mondial	LP
Les Souvenirs	1983	Label: Kadance	LP – with Orchestre Rumbaya
M'Bata	1983	Label: Publi-Son	LP – with Kamikaze Loningisa
1 x 2 = Mabe	1984	Label: Apia (France); Label: I.A.D. (Republic of the Congo)	LP
Couper-Soucis. Otikali! Otikali!	1984	Label: Publi-Son; Printed by SNA; Design: Théophile Mougemba; Photography by Jean Aime Madounouh	LP – with Kamikaze Loningisa
Karibu	1984	Label: Rythmes Et Musique	LP
Kamikaze	1985	Label: Tchika (France); Label: Air (Kenya); Label: Editions FrancAfrique (Kenya); Label: Tshondo Editions (Zambia)	LP – with Kamikaze Loningisa
Side A: "Citron (1)"; Side B: "Citron (2)"	1985	Label: Parions-Congo	Vinyl – with Kamikaze Loningisa
Sentimental 1 (5ème Anniversaire)	1985	Label: I.A.D. (Republic of the Congo); Label: Disques Espérance (France)	LP – with Kamikaze Loningisa
Mon Avocat A Voyagé	1986	Label: Disco Mabele	LP – with Kamikaze Loningisa
Atipo & Moustiquaire	1986	Label: Discques NM	LP – Pamelo Mounka
Lisanga Ya Ba Ndoki	1986	Label: Disques NM; Producer – Norbert Miabanzila	LP – Pamelo Mounka and Kamikaze Loningisa
Marie Bima (Mon Avocat A Voyagé, 2e Épisode)	1987	Label: Bade Stars Music	LP – with Kamikaze Loningisa
Amina Coulibaly	1988	Label: New King Productions; Rights society: SACEM, SDRM, SACD, SGDL	LP – with Kamikaze Loningisa
Dona Beija	1991	Label: YM Productions	LP – with Josky Kiambukuta
Keba Na Moniato	1992	Label: Flash Diffusion Business	LP – with Kamikaze Loningisa
Mwana ya Luambo	1996	Label: SonoDisc	LP
En Pleine Ebulition	Unknown	Label: M & LE; Manufactured by – Usine I.A.D./Congo; Produced for – Matsima & Labo-Export; Distributed by – E.C.G.M	LP – with Kamikaze Loningisa
Oléli Oléli	1996	Label: SonoDisc	LP – with TPOK Jazz
La Releve	1997	Label: SonoDisc	LP – with TPOK Jazz
Infraction	1998	Label: SonoDisc; Design – Philippe Méhul	LP – with TPOK Jazz
Le Verdict	2000	Label: Éditions Vévé International	LP – with TPOK Jazz
