= Josky Kiambukuta =

Congolese musician (1949–2021)

- Also known as: Josky, Djo Sex
- Born: Joseph Kiambukuta Londa; 14 February 1949; Gombe-Matadi, Belgian Congo
- Died: 7 March 2021 (aged 72) Kinshasa, Democratic Republic of the Congo
- Genres: Congolese rumba
- Occupations: Singer; songwriter
- Instruments: Vocals; shaker
- Years active: 1965–2009
- Labels: Éditions Populaires; Mayala; Tchika; Rythmes et Musique; Sans Frontières; Clarys Music; OGP; Sonima
- Formerly of: TPOK Jazz; African Fiesta Sukisa

Joseph Kiambukuta Londa (14 February 1949 – 7 March 2021), known professionally as Josky Kiambukuta, was a Congolese singer-songwriter and composer. He is regarded as one of the most influential figures in Congolese music, particularly as a key member of the TPOK Jazz band led by Franco Luambo Makiadi. Also known for his vocal range that allowed him to switch from high tenor notes to deep bass tones, Kiambukuta composed hits "Kita Mata Bloqué", "Missile", "KSK" and "Chandra".

He died on 7 March 2021, at the age of 72, in a hospital in Kinshasa's Ngaliema clinic after a prolonged illness.

== Life and career ==
=== 1949–1969: Early life and career beginnings ===
Joseph Kiambukuta Londa was born on 14 February 1949, in Gombe-Matadi, Bas-Congo (now Kongo Central), then part of the Belgian Congo (later the Republic of the Congo, subsequently Zaire, and today the Democratic Republic of the Congo), to Bernard Bakiansuni and Albertine Londa. He grew up in Barumbu, Kinshasa, in the Brussels quartier, later renamed Santa Cuba. In his youth, he developed a passionate interest in music, initially aspiring to become a guitarist. Rather than being discouraged by his inability to perfect the guitar, Josky channeled his creativity into songwriting and singing instead. He began composing his own lyrics, scribbling verses and setting them to melodies of his own invention. His first formal experience as a performer came when he joined Orchestre African Star, an amateur band led by Alexis Mombito, a civil servant at the Ministry of Foreign Affairs. Among his peers in this formative period was Lessa Lassan, who would also become a known figure in Congolese music. In 1965, Kiambukuta met Simaro Lutumba, guitarist of TPOK Jazz. Encouraged by his childhood friend Lankis Matondo, Josky visited Simaro's home in Lingwala, where he sang for him for the first time. Impressed by Kiambukuta's voice, Simaro encouraged him to persevere in music.

These early years provided Josky with vital experience in live performance and ensemble work, laying the foundation for his transition into professional music by the late 1960s, when he began pursuing a full-time artistic career.

=== 1969–1972: African Fiesta Sukisa, Orchestre Continental ===
Kiambukuta's professional music career began in 1969 when he joined African Fiesta Sukisa, a prominent band led by guitarist Docteur Nico Kasanda and his brother Dechaud Mwamba. At just 20 years old, he quickly made an impact, recording his first hit, "Sadi Naboyi Masumu". Another notable track from this period was his composition "Bolingo ya Sens Unique", a solo piece that highlighted his high tenor capabilities and themes of unrequited love.

In 1971, seeking greater creative control, Josky left African Fiesta Sukisa along with bandmates Bopol Mansiamina, Serpent Kabamba, Wuta Mayi, and Sita Malukisa to form Orchestre Continental. This new band allowed him to experiment more freely, and he composed and sang lead on several tracks, including the popular hit "Nakobondela", which gained traction in the Congolese music circuit. Another standout was "Mama Na Nicole", composed by Bopol Mansiamina, where Josky provided lead vocals backed by Wuta Mayi. Orchestre Continental's brief but impactful run from 1971 to 1972 solidified Josky's reputation as a versatile vocalist and composer, though the band disbanded as members pursued new opportunities.

During his early collaborations with Docteur Nico, he adopted the shortened stage name Josky, derived from his given name Joseph and his surname Kiambukuta. Later, while performing with Continental, he earned the flamboyant nickname "Josky Sex Soum" from fans at the popular Chez Faignond bar in Poto-Poto (Brazzaville), after popularizing a dance style called sex soum, an adaptation of Tabu Ley's soum djoum.

=== 1973–1989: TPOK Jazz and solo ventures ===
In 1973, Simaro Lutumba facilitated Josky's entry into Franco's TPOK Jazz. A long-time admirer of Tabu Ley Rochereau and the African Jazz school, Josky composed songs rooted in the fiesta style, lyrical, melodic, and dance-oriented, quite distinct from the heavier, guitar-driven odemba sound of TPOK Jazz. His first three songs were rejected by Franco for "incompatibility of style". Simaro again stepped in, mentoring Josky and helping him adapt his lyricism and vocal phrasing to fit the odemba idiom. This mentorship yielded two hits "Monzo" and "Kebana", which marked Josky's full integration into the odemba school. Josky quickly rose to prominence within the band and developed what came to be known as the "style Josky", a refined blend of Manianga folklore rhythms and modern Congolese rumba, characterized by crisp phrasing, expressive nuance, and subtle rhythmic syncopation. His reputation grew, and his performances enthralled audiences at Franco's Un-Deux-Trois dancing bar, with his admirers dubbing him "Commandant de bord". Other early releases by Josky and TPOK Jazz included "Toto", "Fariya", "Bisengambi" and "Mobali Amesana Na Ngai".

In 1977, while still an active member of TPOK Jazz, he embarked on a side project with fellow musicians Youlou Mabiala and Mayaula Mayoni, forming a short-lived studio session band known as MaMaKi, an acronym derived from their surnames (Mabiala–Mayaula–Kiambukuta). Under the Ya Tamba label, the trio recorded several original songs which were released as singles. For this venture, Josky composed "Limbisa ngai", "Masivi", and "Mosese".

In 1979, he composed "Tokabola Sentiment", which depicts the dizziness of love's troubles, and was followed by "Propiétaire" in 1980, a smash hit about a woman's shock at romantic rejection and the 14-minute "Bimansha" in 1981. Many of his compositions from this period delved into themes of love, betrayal, and emotional turmoil that resonated with audiences across Africa. Josky's debut album Franco présente Josky Kiambukuta was released in 1983, and it spotlighted his talents with hits like "Alita", "Massini", "Mehida", and "Limbisa Ngai". That same year, he participated in the Lisanga Ya Banganga sessions in Paris, the collaborative project that reunited Franco and Tabu Ley Rochereau. Josky recorded the album Missile alongside Franco, accompanied by saxophonist Matalanza. "Missile" is noted for its Congolese rumba lamentation of romantic suffering. Josky composed the title track, "Laissez Passer", "Tu es Méchante" and the hit "Chacun pour Soi", which is often miscredited to Franco. Outside TPOK Jazz, he contributed vocals to Koffi Olomide's debut album Ngounda. He also contributed "KSK" to the 1984 album Franco et le TPOK Jazz à L'Ancienne Belgique and "Likambo na Moto te" to the 1985 Mario album.

However, in 1986, he left the band amid internal dynamics, teaming up with fellow TPOK Jazz vocalist Ntesa Dalienst and Serge Kiambukuta for independent projects. Memorable recordings from this interlude include the album Selengina et Ayez Pitié including "Selengina", the ballad "Ayez Pitié", and the upbeat "Le Monde et ses Problèmes". His absence was keenly felt; during a 1986 TPOK Jazz tour in Kenya, fans demanded his songs repeatedly. Convinced by Franco, Josky returned to TPOK Jazz in 1987, releasing the LP Mata Kita Bloqué including "Mata Kita Bloqué", "Minzata", and a remake of "Tokabola Sentiment" as "Osilisi Ngai Mayele", featuring Malage de Lugendo and Madilu System. He also collaborated on So.Pe.Ka in 1988 with Mayaula Mayoni, Madilu System, and Malage de Lugendo.

=== 1989–2005: TPOK Jazz, Bana OK, and solo albums ===
After Franco's death in October 1989, alongside veterans such as Simaro, Ndombe Opetum, Madilu System and others, Josky worked to keep TPOK Jazz alive in the immediate aftermath, striving to maintain the band's legacy despite uncertainties about its leadership and financial future. During this transitional phase, Josky continued to assert his creative independence. In 1990, he released his successful solo studio album Chandra, followed by the 1991 LP Les Mayeno à Gogo, including the hit "Baby".

However, internal tensions grew as disputes over royalties, artistic direction, and the management of Franco's estate began to divide the remaining musicians. Between 1993 and 1994, disagreements with Franco's family reached a breaking point, leading Josky, Simaro, Ndombe, and several senior members, except Madilu System who launched a solo career, to found a new band called Bana OK. The band positioned itself as a tribute and a continuation of Franco's legacy, maintaining the odemba style. Josky emerged as one of Bana OK's leading voices and composers, and in 1999, he recorded Dernier Avertissement, whose title track is a haunting Congolese rumba that reflects on mortality, the passage of time, and the moral lessons of life, a song often interpreted as his philosophical response to the loss of Franco and the disillusionment of the post-TPOK Jazz years.

By the early 2000s, the Bana OK project gradually dispersed as members pursued solo ventures and opportunities abroad. Josky relocated to France, settling in Paris. There, he continued to record prolifically, releasing Oui Ça Va (2003), Double Vie (2005), and the duet album Chiffre 3 (2005) with Madilu System.

== Illness and death ==
Josky returned to Kinshasa in 2011, but health issues, including a severe foot problem, curtailed his performing career, leaving him unable to walk in his final years. He retired around 2009 but appeared on television to discuss his storied career, sharing anecdotes about his time with Franco Luambo Makiadi's TPOK Jazz and the evolution of Congolese music. After years of ill health, Josky died on 7 March 2021, in Kinshasa, prompting tributes from fans and fellow musicians worldwide. Following his death, he was interred in Kinshasa on 11 April.

== Artistry ==
Josky's gift for composing hit songs quickly set him apart. After mastering the odemba style, a rhythmic and melodic tradition originating from the Mongo people of Mbandaka and popularized by Franco Luambo, he shaped a phrasing and expressive nuance uniquely his own. This newly formed "Josky style" was integrated into TPOK Jazz's rhythmic structure, complementing the established styles of Franco and Simaro Lutumba. Rather than bridging the two or imitating African Fiesta Sukisa, Josky crafted a sound that blended Manianga folk elements with modern sounds. His 1981 song "Bimansha" introduced an even more syncopated rhythm to TPOK Jazz.

Josky also stood out with his emotionally expressive voice, which led him to become TPOK Jazz's principal vocalist. Like Vicky Longomba before him, his voice became synonymous with the band itself. Recognizing his significance, Franco appointed him as TPOK Jazz's second vice president after Simaro. As noted by music journalist Samuel Malonga, Josky continued the artistic lineage of Le Grand Kallé and Tabu Ley Rochereau, "though his songs initially lacked the intensity of his mentors", combining a "suave, playboy image and seductive lyrics".

== Discography ==
From his earliest work with African Fiesta Sukisa to his final compositions, Josky never kept track of the number of songs he had written. He deliberately avoided counting them, as he was motivated by an unending drive to outdo himself. Leaving behind "hundreds of compositions for posterity", his vast body of work remains difficult to quantify. His repertoire includes:

Band	Notable songs
African Fiesta Sukisa	"Bolingo ya sens unique"; "Sadi naboyi masumu"; "Motema se likolo"; "Okosuka wapi"; "Chérie Julie"; "Marianne"
Orchestre Continental	"Mokili"; "Nakobondela"; "Nakombela bolingo"; "Bakokamwa"; "Yo motéma"
Mamaki	"Limbisa ngai"; "Masivi"; "Mosese"
Canon du Zaïre	"Tshebo"
TPOK Jazz	"KSK"; "Propriétaire"; "Fariya"; "Tu es méchant"; "Baby"; "Alita Tshamala"; "Bisengambi"; "Missile"; "Soweto"; "Lukusa Tanzi"; "Monzo"; "Kebana"; "Bimansha"
Bana OK	"Point faible"; "Papa pasteur"; "Baracuda"

=== Solo ===
- Mehida (1983)
- Missile (1983, with Franco Luambo)
- Médecin de Nuit (1985, with Ntesa Dalienst)
- Selengina et Ayez Pitié (1986, with Ntesa Dalienst and Serge Kiambukuta)
- Mata Kita Bloqué (1987)
- So.Pe.Ka (1988, with Mayaula Mayoni, Madilu System and Malage de Lugendo)
- Destin / La Sincérité (1989, with Madilu System)
- Chandra (1990)
- Dernier Avertissement (1999)
- Oui Ça Va (2003)
- Double Vie (2005)
- Chiffre 3 (2005, with Madilu System)
