= Ndombe Opetum =

- Birth name: Ndombe Opetum
- Also known as: Pepe Ndombe
- Born: March 3, 1944
- Died: May 24, 2012 (aged 68)
- Genres: Soukous
- Occupation(s): composer, vocalist
- Years active: 1960 - 2012

Ndombe Opetum (March 3, 1944 – May 24, 2012), popularly known as Pepe Ndombe, was an Odemba recording artist, composer, and vocalist, in the Democratic Republic of the Congo (DRC). He was once a member of the seminal soukous band TPOK Jazz which dominated the Congolese music scene from the 1960s through the 1980s.

== Music career with TPOK Jazz ==
Ndombe Opetum was the lead vocalist for Afrisa International, prior to joining TPOK Jazz, in the mid-1970s, after Sam Mangwana had left the band. He came over to TPOK Jazz with horn player Empopo Loway, and he stayed with the band until it split up in December 1993, four years after the death of founder François Luambo Makiadi. Contemporary band members at the time included vocalists: Wuta Mayi, Michel Boyibanda, Josky Kiambukuta, and Youlou Mabiala, and rhythm guitarist Simaro Lutumba and solo guitarist Franco himself.

Ndombe Opetum is credited with composing the following songs for the band, among others:

- Voyage na Bandundu
- Mawe
- Mabe Yo Mabe – in 1977
- Coupe du Monde – in 1979
- Youyou – in 1980
- Nayebi Ndenge Bakolela Ngai – in 1982
- Angela – in 1989
- Tawaba – in 1989

== Music career post TPOK Jazz ==
Following the death of Franco in 1989, TPOK Jazz continued to play together for four years. Simarro would take care of the musicians and the family would take care of the lawyers, record labels, and other technical stakeholders. The musicians would share 70% of receipts, while the Franco family would keep 30% of all receipts. However, differences developed between the musicians and the Franco family, and the band split up in December 1993. Ndombe Opetum, together with Simaro Lutumba, Josky Kiambukuta, and about thirty former TPOK Jazz members. He was also a founding member of the band Bana OK in January 1994 and was a member of the band up until his death in May 2012.

== Personal life ==
Pepe Ndombe Opetum was born in Bandundu Province in what was then known as the Belgian Congo in 1944. He was educated in Leopoldville (now Kinshasa). He was married and was the father of nine children. His fifth offspring is a son, born in Kinshasa on 3 March 1974, who is also a professional vocalist in the DRC. The young Ndombe calls himself Baby Ndombe or Baby Black, and has performed to large audiences in Africa, Europe, and North America, targeting primarily the African Diaspora.

== Death ==
Pepe Ndombe Opetum died of cardiac arrest on May 24, 2012, in Kinshasa, Democratic Republic of Congo. At the time of his death, his age was reported as 68 years old.

== See also ==
- Franco Luambo Makiadi
- Sam Mangwana
- Josky Kiambukuta
- TPOK Jazz
- List of African musicians
