= Simaro Lutumba =

Congolese musical artist (1938–2019)

Lutumba Simaro Masiya
- Also known as: Lutumba Simaro Masiya
- Born: Simon Lutumba Ndomanueo; 19 March 1938; Léopoldville, Belgian Congo (now Kinshasa, Democratic Republic of the Congo)
- Died: 30 March 2019 (aged 81) Paris, France
- Genres: Congolese rumba; soukous
- Occupations: composer, arranger, producer, guitarist
- Instrument: Rhythm guitar
- Years active: 1959 – 2018
- Formerly of: TPOK Jazz; Bana OK

Simaro Massiya Lutumba Ndomanueno (19 March 1938 – 30 March 2019), known as Simaro, was a Congolese music rhythm guitarist, songwriter, poet, composer, and bandleader. He was a member of the seminal Congo music band TPOK Jazz, which dominated the music scene in the Democratic Republic of the Congo (DRC) from the 1960s to the 1980s.

== Early life ==
Simaro was born in Uíge Province, Angola.

== Music career with OK Jazz ==
Simaro started playing with Franco Luambo, the founder of OK Jazz, in 1961. They were later joined by Josky Kiambukuta and Ndombe Opetum. Youlou Mabiala and Madilu System also played with OK Jazz, before their solo careers. Simaro served as Vice President of the band for many years and led the group during Franco's long trips to Europe during the 1980s. His composition of the band's hit song 'Mabele' earned him the nickname 'Poet'. DRC authorities jailed him, Franco and other musicians, for two obscene songs in the late 1970s. Simaro is considered as one of the greatest poets, singers and philosophers of Congolese music.

== Discography ==
Simaro is credited with composing many songs for the band, including:

- Likambo Zi Tu Zoto Esilkata Te - Sung by Michel Boyibanda, Josky Kiambukuta and Sam Mangwana
- Oko Regretter Ngai Mama - Sung by Michel Boyibanda, Josky Kiambukuta, Wuta Mayi and Lola Checain
- Bodutaka - Sung by Sam Mangwana, Michèl Boyibanda, Josky Kiambukuta and Lola Chécain
- Mabele - Sung by Sam Mangwana
- Eau Benite - Sung by Madilu System
- Maya - Sung by Carlyto Lassa
- Testament ya Bowule - Sung by Malage de Lugendo
- Vaccination - Sung by Kiesse Diambu
- Ebale ya Zaire - Sung by Sam Mangwana
- Faute Ya Commercant - Sung by Sam Mangwana
- Cedou - Sung by Sam Mangwana, Michel Boyibanda & Franco
- Bisalela - Sung by Youlou Mabiala, Josky Kiambukuta, Michel Boyibanda and Wuta Mayi
- Mbongo - Sung by Djo Mpoyi
- Salle d'attente - Sung by Ferre Gola, Josky Kiambukuta, M'bilia Bel and Papa Wemba
- Kadima - Sung by Djo Mpoyi

== Music career post OKJazz ==
Following Franco's death in 1989, Simaro agreed to continue the band, sharing 30% of revenue with the late band leader's family. In 1993 OKJazz split over disagreements how funds were shared. Simaro and 30 OKJazz musicians formed Bana OK in 1994.

== Death ==
Simaro Massiya Lutumba died in a hospital in Paris, France, on Saturday 30 March 2019. The musician was known to suffer from diabetes and hypertension.

== See also ==
- African Rumba
- Music of the Democratic Republic of the Congo
- Francois Luambo Makiadi
- List of African musicians
