= Ngaba Roundabout =

Traffic intersection in Kinshasa, Democratic Republic of the Congo

The Ngaba Roundabout (French: Rond-point Ngaba), also referred to as the Ngaba Crossroads (Carrefour de Ngaba), is a significant intersection in the southern part of Kinshasa, Democratic Republic of the Congo. Situated in the Mount Amba District, it marks the southern boundary of the Ngaba commune and lies at the convergence of Avenue de l'Université and By-pass Avenue (also known as Avenue de la Foire). The area surrounding the roundabout is locally referred to as Mont-Amba and serves as a key hub connecting the communes of Lemba and Makala.

== Traffic ==
Traffic is infamously chaotic, plagued by constant congestion and regulatory issues. Despite attempts by Kinshasa's authorities to enforce traffic regulations, local defiance toward stringent enforcement has significantly impeded operational governance. As an integral artery within the highly trafficked By-pass Avenue, the roundabout plays a central role in the capital's transportation infrastructure. By-pass Avenue converges with National Road No. 1 at this intersection, forming a critical thoroughfare that interlinks Kongo-Central Province with Kwilu Province via Kinshasa. This arterial route navigates through prominent communes, including Lemba, Matete, Ngaba, Makala, Selembao, and Mont-Ngafula, making its functionality essential for regional interconnectivity and the logistical flow of commodities into the city.

The endemic gridlock at the roundabout stems primarily from the confluence of freight carriers coming from Kongo-Central and local public transport taxi-buses, colloquially known as Esprit de mort. The amalgamation of these transport modes, coupled with multidirectional traffic flow, frequently precipitates severe bottlenecks. The roundabout is also compounded by substandard roads in Makala and Ngaba, many of which are still unpaved.

In 2007, the Congolese newspaper Le Potentiel noted the worsening state of transportation in the area, noting that formerly usable secondary avenues had become impassable.

== Social and environmental issues ==
The section of By-pass Avenue between the roundabout and the Righini entrance is heavily degraded, with malodorous sludge, potholes, and garbage strewn along the roadway. Women vendors operate in disarray on the street, navigating amidst waste and deteriorating infrastructure. The area is also characterized by disorderly commerce, with more than fifty small buses parked permanently near the roundabout, providing intra-city transit and substantial trucks from Kongo-Central discharging agricultural goods and charcoal directly onto the thoroughfare.

The Ngaba Roundabout Market (Marché de Rond-point Ngaba), located at the intersection, arose from the bustling trade in agricultural products from Kongo-Central. However, the market is plagued by poor sanitation, with inadequate waste disposal facilities. Trash cans around the market emit foul odors, and foodstuffs remain perpetually exposed to swarms of flies. Additionally, local residents exacerbate the problem by dumping household waste at the market during the night. The market's voluntary cleaning initiative (Salongo) sees low participation, leaving trash and organic waste to accumulate, which blocks gutters and creates unsanitary conditions. This mix of muck and waste exacerbates the deterioration of the already compromised roadway.

The roundabout also serves as a congregation point for street children, locally referred to as Shégués, who number in the hundreds and sleep on market stalls at night.

Tragic incidents have also stressed the area's vulnerabilities. In August 2023, a fuel tank truck traveling along By-pass Avenue between the Triangle bus stop and the Ngaba Roundabout exploded near the Righini entrance in the commune of Lemba, resulting in at least five deaths.
