= Franco Luambo =

Congolese musician and cultural revolutionary (1938–1989)

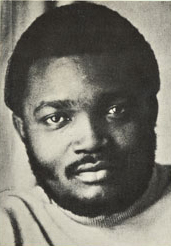
- Luambo in the early 1970s

Background information
- Also known as: Franco; Le Fou; Franco De mi Amor; Oncle Yorgho; Grand Maître; Ya Fuala; Sorcier de la guitare
- Born: François Luambo Luanzo Makiadi; 6 July 1938; Sona Bata, Belgian Congo
- Origin: Léopoldville, Belgian Congo
- Died: 12 October 1989 (aged 51) Yvoir, Belgium
- Genres: Congolese rumba; soukous
- Occupations: Guitarist; singer-songwriter; bandleader
- Instruments: Guitar; vocals
- Years active: 1950s–1980s
- Labels: Loningisa; Ngoma; SonoDisc; Edipop; CHOC; Le Passeport; African Sun Music; Surboum African Jazz; Les Editions Populaires; Epanza Makita; Fonior; Pathé Marconi; Boma Bango; Lulonga; Visa 80; PolyGram Records; Associated Sound Limited
- Formerly of: Kebo; Bandidu; Watam; LOPADI; Bana Loningisa; OK Jazz; TPOK Jazz
- Spouses: Marie-José Kenge (alias Majos); Pauline Masouba

François Luambo Luanzo Makiadi (6 July 1938 – 12 October 1989) was a Congolese guitarist, singer-songwriter, bandleader, and cultural revolutionary. He was a central figure in 20th-century Congolese and African music, principally as the bandleader for over 20 years of TPOK Jazz, the most popular and influential African band of its time. He is referred to as Franco Luambo or simply Franco. Known for his mastery of Congolese rumba, he was nicknamed by fans and critics "Sorcerer of the Guitar" and the "Grand Maître of Zairean Music", as well as "Franco de Mi Amor" by female fans. AllMusic described him as the "big man in African music". His extensive musical repertoire included social commentary on love, interpersonal relationships, marriage, decorum, politics, rivalries, mysticism, and commercialism. In 2023, Rolling Stone ranked him at number 71 on its list of the 250 Greatest Guitarists of All Time.

Born in Sona-Bata in Kongo Central and raised in Kinshasa, Luambo was mentored in his youth by Congolese musicians Paul Ebengo Dewayon and Albert Luampasi, who helped introduce him to the music industry. He initially performed with Luampasi's band, Bandidu, alongside Dewayon, and later worked with Dewayon's band Watam, under the auspices of the Loningisa label, managed by Greek music executive Basile Papadimitriou. After a successful audition for producer Henri Bowane, Luambo was signed to a long-term contract by Loningisa. In 1954, he joined LOPADI (Loningisa de Papadimitriou), during which period Bowane began calling him simply "Franco".

Luambo co-founded OK Jazz in 1956, which emerged as a defining force in Congolese and African popular music. As the band's lead guitarist, Luambo developed a distinctive style characterized by polyrhythmic sophistication and intricate multi-string plucking, laying the foundation for what became known as the "OK Jazz School". His innovative approach to the sebene, which positioned it at the song's climax and incorporated a syncopated thumb-and-forefinger plucking technique, revolutionized the genre and became central to the band's sound. This style was deeply rooted in rumba odemba, a rhythmic and melodic tradition emanating from the Mongo people of Mbandaka. Franco's early recordings in the 1950s, including the Congolese rumba hits "Bato Ya Mabe Batondi Mboka", "Joséphine Naboyi Ye", and "Da Da De Tu Amor", as well as upbeat cha-cha-chá hits like "Linda Linda", "Maria Valenta", and "Alliance Mode Succès", helped define Congolese rumba's sound across Central, Eastern, and parts of Western Africa, while "On Entre O.K., On Sort K.O." became the band's emblematic motto.

In 1967, Luambo became the co-leader of OK Jazz, alongside vocalist Vicky Longomba, and when the latter departed in 1970, Luambo assumed full leadership. The following year, the band was renamed as Tout-Puissant Orchestre Kinois de Jazz (TPOK Jazz), meaning "the almighty Kinshasa jazz orchestra". Throughout the 1970s, Luambo became increasingly engaged in politics and aligned himself with President Mobutu Sese Seko's state ideology of Authenticité. He wrote several songs extolling Mobutu and his administration. By the early 1980s, a significant number of TPOK Jazz members had relocated to Europe, seeking refuge from the worsening socio-economic conditions in Kinshasa. Despite the dispersion, the band remained remarkably productive and released a series of hits: "12 600 Lettres" (1984); "Lettre à Mr. Le Directeur Général" (1983), a collaboration with Tabu Ley Rochereau and his Orchestre Afrisa International; and "Non" (1983). The Luambo-Madilu duo yielded some of their standout releases: "Mamou" (alternately known as "Tu Vois", 1984), "Mario" (1985), "La Vie des Hommes" (1986), and "Batela Makila Na Ngai" (also known as "Sadou", 1988).

In recognition of his musical impact, Luambo was named an Officer of the National Order of the Leopard in 1976, and he was awarded the Maracas d'Or in 1982 for his influence on Francophone music. Though twice married, Luambo's personal life was often marred by well-known infidelities. In his final years, rapid weight loss and persistent rumors of AIDS overshadowed his career, prompting his 1988 song "Les Rumeurs (Baiser ya Juda)" as a direct response. He died in 1989 in Mont-Godinne, Yvoir, Belgium.

== Life and career ==
=== 1938–1952: Early life and career beginnings ===
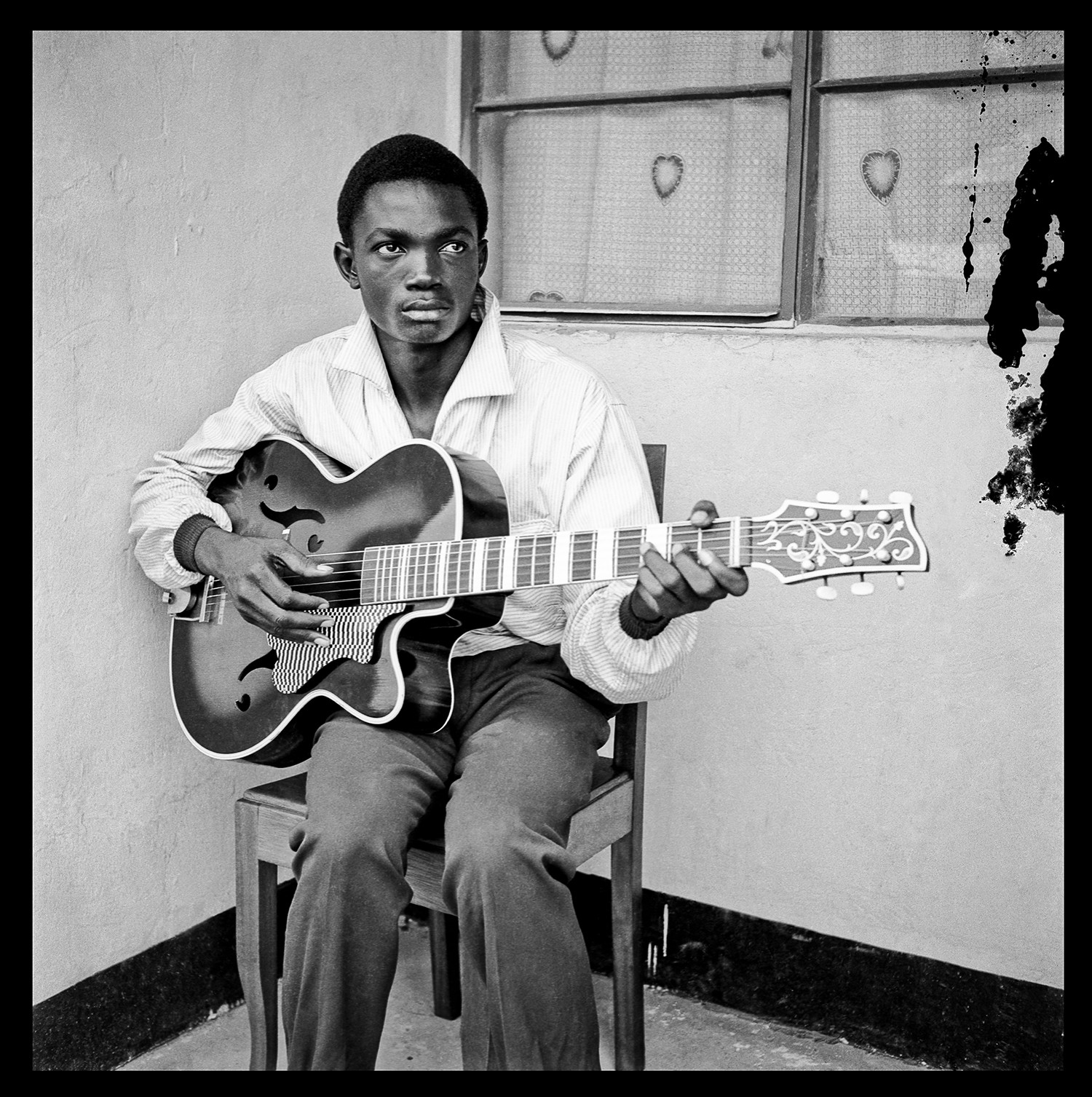
A young Franco Luambo playing guitar in Léopoldville in 1956

François Luambo Luanzo Makiadi was born on 6 July 1938 in Sona-Bata, Bas-Congo (now Kongo Central), in what was then the Belgian Congo (currently the Democratic Republic of the Congo). He came from an interethnic background: his father, Yvon Emongo, was a Tetela railway worker, while his mother, Hélène Mbonga Makiese, was Kongo with Ngombé roots through her paternal lineage. Luambo was one of three children. Following Yvon's death, Hélène had three additional children, with two different partners.

Luambo was raised in Léopoldville (now Kinshasa) on Opala Avenue, in Dendale (now Kasa-Vubu commune). He attended Léo II primary school in Kintambo, and by 1948, he became increasingly enamored of music, inspired by the emerging Congolese rumba scene, particularly through musicians like Le Grand Kallé. Luambo started out by playing the harmonica. In 1949, at the age of 11, his father's death effectively curtailed his formal education, due to financial constraints. With no means to continue his schooling, he devoted his time to playing the harmonica and other instruments and later joined a group called Kebo, noted for its rhythmic sound, primarily produced by the patenge, a wooden frame drum held between the legs, with its tone altered by pressing the skin with the heel. As financial hardships exacerbated, Hélène, apprehensive about Luambo's future, sought assistance from a family acquaintance, Daniel Bandeke. Bandeke secured Luambo a job packing records at a well-known record label and studio named Ngoma. There, entranced by the musicians he met, Luambo clandestinely taught himself to play guitar whenever the musicians finished their recordings. According to Congolese musicologist Clément Ossinondé, Luambo's ability quickly became apparent, with immense astonishment prevailing "the day it was discovered that the packer was a budding guitar genius".

In 1950, the family relocated to Ngiri-Ngiri, where they rented a house owned by the relatives of fellow Congolese guitarist Paul Ebengo Dewayon, who was making significant progress in his career and worked at the Tissaco textile factory, which was part of UTEXLÉO. Luambo and Dewayon struck up a friendship, which allowed Luambo to further hone his musical skills. Another notable mentor was Albert Luampasi, a guitarist and composer affiliated with Ngoma, under whose tutelage Luambo further polished his guitar skills, before being included in Luampasi's circle alongside Dewayon and beginning to attend performances with Luampasi's band, Bandidu. Although at that time, musical pursuits were viewed as degrading and synonymous with youth delinquency, he pursued music with immense zeal to support his mother, whose sole means of sustaining the family was selling doughnuts at the Ngiri-Ngiri market. In 1952, Luambo officially joined Bandidu and toured with the band in Bas-Congo, including an extended stay in Moerbeke, Kwilu Ngongo, where they remained for several months. By that point, Luampasi had already released four tracks with Ngoma, which enabled him to forge a strong reputation. Songs such as "Chérie Mabanza", "Nzola Andambo", "Ziunga Kia Tumba", and "Mu Kintwadi Kieto" became emblematic of this period. Luambo also became associated with the Bills subculture during this time.

=== 1953: Watam ===
Luambo's stint with the Léopoldville-based band Watam is disputed. British musicologist Gary Stewart contends that Luambo co-founded Watam in 1950 with Dewayon, alongside other musicians such as Louis Bikunda, Ganga Mongwalu, and Mutombo. According to this account, the band played sporadic gigs over the next three years and earned modest rewards for their efforts. In contrast, Clément Ossinondé offers a differing perspective, asserting that Dewayon initially formed Watam and that Luambo joined the group in 1953 after his return to Léopoldville. That same year, Watam garnered critical acclaim with two songs composed by Dewayon, "Bokilo Ayébi Kobota" and "Nyekesse", which were released in February 1953 through Loningisa. Watam regularly performed in Ngiri-Ngiri, particularly at Kanza Bar on Rue de Bosenge.

Regardless of the precise timeline, Luambo and Dewayon soon auditioned for Henri Bowane, who introduced Luambo to Greek producer and record executive Basile Papadimitriou at the Loningisa studio in August 1953. Impressed by Luambo's virtuosity during the audition, Papadimitriou quickly signed him to a ten-year production contract. As a token of recognition for his burgeoning abilities, Luambo was gifted a modern guitar nicknamed Libaku ya nguma ("the head of the boa"), which, despite being as large as Luambo at 15, he played with "striking expressive power" during studio sessions. Ossinondé noted that this became Luambo's first professional instrument, which he used to accompany Dewayon on four tracks composed by him in August: "Esengo ya mokili", "Tuba mbote", "Bikunda", and "Groupe Watam". Two months later, they recorded additional songs with Watam, including Mongwalu's "Senene mingi" and "Bon okoluka ngai" and Dewayon's "Bana bosenge" and "Nainu ngai nakufi te". In November, Luambo recorded his two debut compositions with Watam at Loningisa, under the name Lwambo François: "Lilima Dis Cherie Wa Ngai" and "Kombo Ya Loningisa". He then accompanied Watam on Dewayon's "Yembele Yembele" and "Tango ya pokwa" as well as Mutombo's "Tongo etani matata" and "Tika kobola tolo".

=== 1954–1957: Rise with LOPADI and OK Jazz formation ===
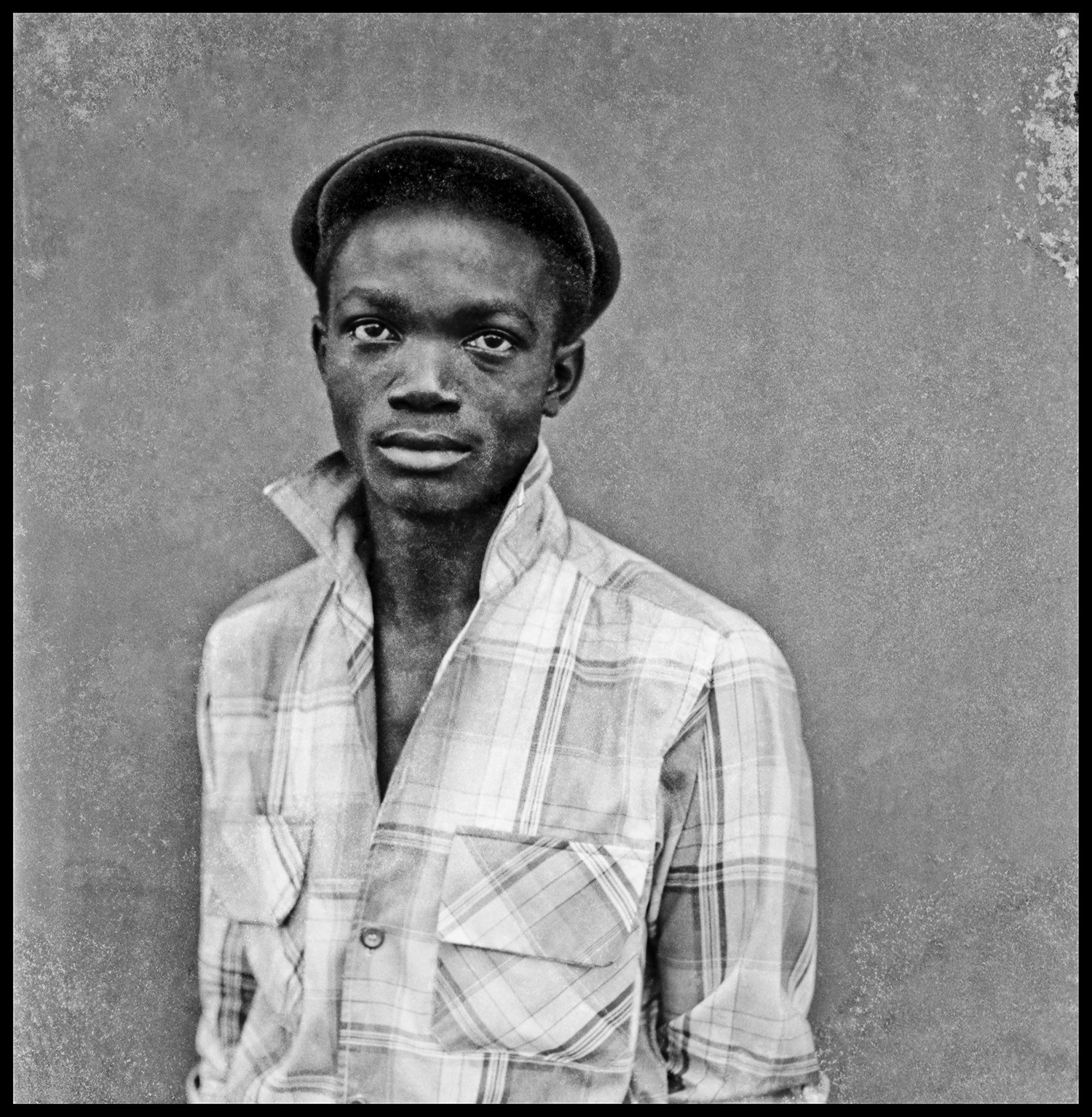
A young Franco in Léopoldville, 1956

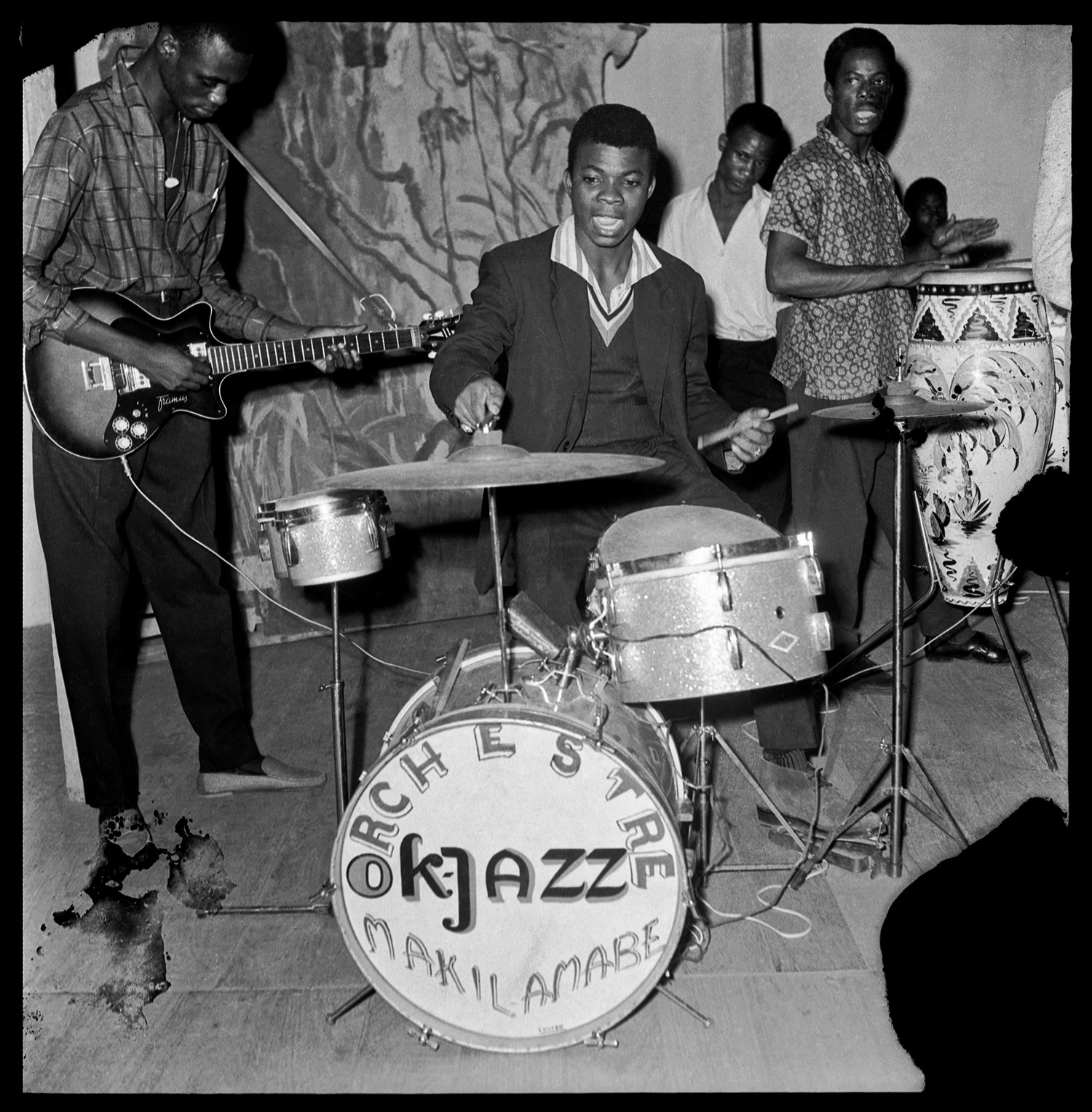
Drummer of OK Jazz in Léopoldville

In 1954, Luambo joined LOPADI (Loningisa de Papadimitriou), a house band for Loningisa, formed by Bowane, who gave him the epithet "Franco", which subsequently became his stage name. He worked alongside musicians such as Philippe Lando Rossignol, Daniel Loubelo "De La Lune", Edouard Ganga "Edo", and Nicolas Bosuma "Dessoin", and quickly stood out with his guitar technique. Franco's debut solo recordings, "Marie Catho" and "Bayini Ngai Mpo Na Yo" (alternatively titled "Bolingo Na Ngai Na Béatrice"), premiered in October 1955 and swiftly gained widespread attention, which earned him the sobriquet "Franco de Mi Amor" from an expanding female fandom. Ossinondé described these songs as the "greatest success of 1955", and they became Luambo's first records to gain broad popularity in the Belgian Congo and across Africa. Capitalizing on this success during the intense rivalry between the Ngoma and Opika labels, Loningisa worked to maximize the potential of its artists, especially Luambo, who introduced unique harmonic and rhythmic touches in his early recordings.

That same year, he became part of Bana Loningisa ("children of Loningisa"), a looser collective of Loningisa. From then on, his guitar appeared on several Loningisa recordings, mostly releases from November 1955 to June 1956. These included De La Lune's "Mia poza", "Komeka te", "Tika bizeti", and "Tango ekoki"; Dewayon's "Vis-à-vis", "Locia wa ngai", "Mabele okanisaka", and "Dit Antoinette"; Luambo's "Flamingo", "Véronica o mboka Bukigam", "Elo mama", "Naboyi yo te", "Ba petits bongo luwo", and "Anna mabele ya ngoya"; Vicky Longomba's "Nalingi ozonga", "Mokili mobongwani", "Viclong Julie", and "Bolingo eleki kisi"; Pholidor Tandjigorah's "Oyo elingi motema" and "Rumbamba"; Rossignol's "Thérèse d'Amour" and "Wa bolingo"; Augustin Moniania "Roitelet"'s "Chérie Margo" and "Houlala mopanzi"; Jean Serge Essous' "Alice" and "Chérie atiki ngai"; Pedro "Bemi" Kosi's "Nabosani ndako" and "Palabras amorosas"; and Dessoin's "Wapi yo" and "Osili obébi".

In June 1956, several musicians from Bana Loningisa, engaged by Oscar Kashama Kassien, who had become well-acquainted with performing at the O.K. Bar dance hall (named in tribute to its owner, Kassien), formed an orchestra that adopted the name "OK Jazz", on the initiative of Essous. The newly established band, under the guidance of Kassien, initially had around ten musicians: Luambo, Essous, De La Lune, Rossignol, Ben Saturnin Pandi, Roitelet, Marie-Isidore Diaboua "Lièvre", Liberlin de Soriba Diop, Pella "Lamontha", and Bosuma Dessoin, before ultimately consolidating to seven. While clarinetist Essous became the bandleader (chef d'orchestre), Luambo emerged as a prolific songwriter; Essous called him a "kind of genius" for having written over a hundred songs in his notebooks by that point.

Luambo also became known for his mastery of the "sixth" technique, wherein he plucked multiple strings at once, a style from which he gave birth to what became known as the "OK Jazz School". This technique was central to the band's signature sound, which drew heavily from rumba odemba, a rhythmic and stylistic approach said to have roots in the folklore of the Mongo ethnic group from Mbandaka. Social anthropologist Bob W. White characterizes rumba odemba as rhythmic, repetitive, visceral, and traditionalist. The style often featured a dozen vocalists; a seven-piece horn section; a rhythm section comprising bass, drums, and congas; and three guitars (lead, rhythm, and mi-solo), weaving complex interlocking patterns. OK Jazz quickly became a rival to the leading established band of that time, African Jazz, under "Le Grand Kallé" Kabasele, with Luambo rivaling premier Congolese guitarists Emmanuel Tshilumba wa Boloji "Tino Baroza" and Nicolas "Dr. Nico" Kasanda. He collaborated closely with Essous, creating a dynamic partnership that yielded some of the band's most revered tracks, including the Luambo-penned Congolese rumba-infused breakout anthem "On Entre O.K., On Sort K.O.", released in December 1956. The song achieved considerable success and evolved into the band's emblematic motto.

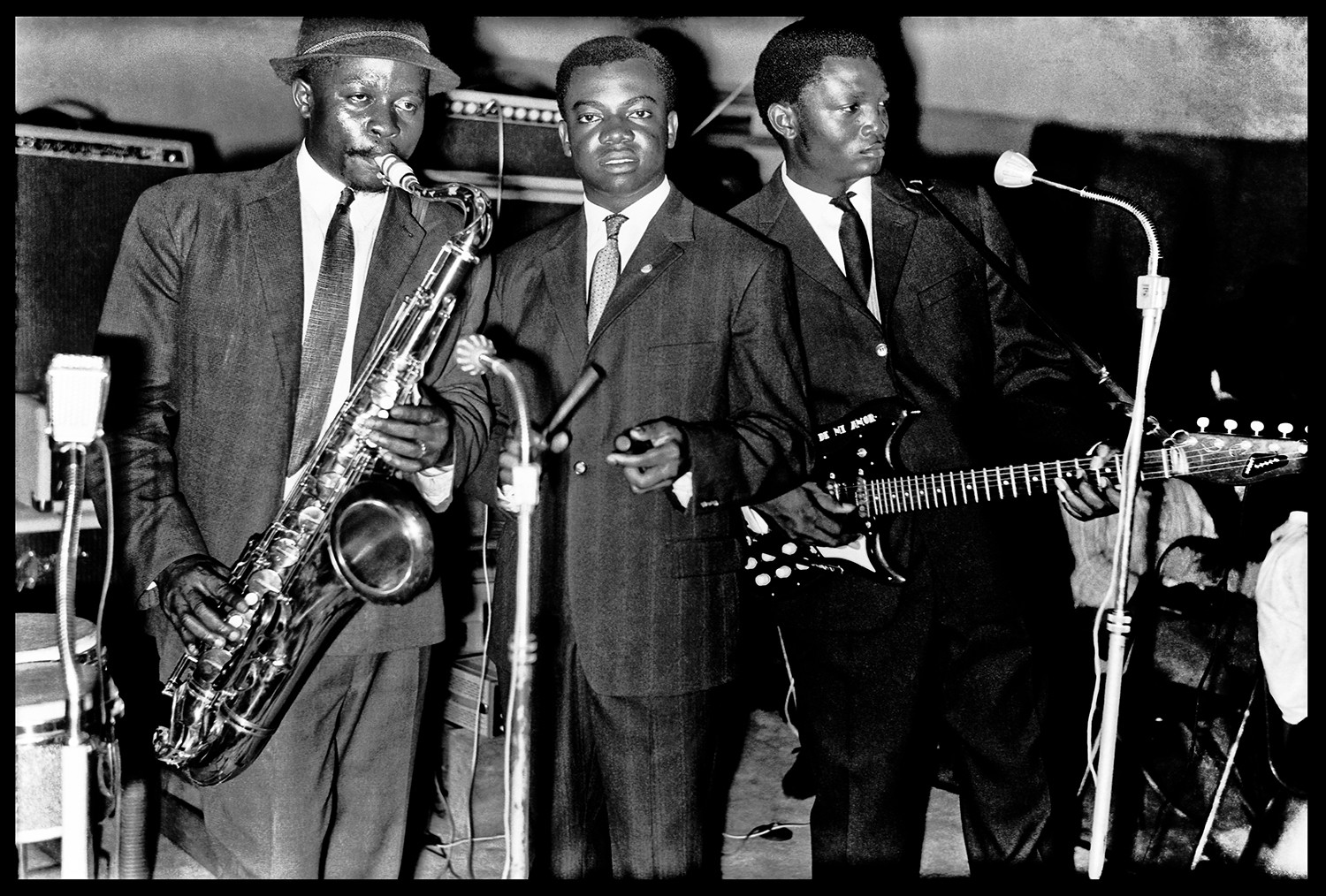
Franco (right), Isaac Musekiwa (left), and Joseph "Mujos" Mulama in Léopoldville, c. 1963

In December 1956, OK Jazz began to see changes in its lineup. New musicians, including Edo, Célestin Kouka, Nino Malapet (previously of the disbanded Negro Jazz band), and Antoine Armando "Brazzos", joined in December and filled the void left by departing members. By 1957, OK Jazz lost its bandleader, Essous, as well as original vocalist Rossignol, when they were hired away by Bowane for his new record label, Esengo (Bowane had departed from Loningisa after OK Jazz eclipsed his influence). While vocalist Vicky Longomba became the new bandleader, Luambo also stepped up as the primary guitarist and overseer of musical direction. That year, he composed the popular song "Aya la Mode", which incorporated the guitar riff from the Mexican folk song "La Bamba". It exemplified the muziki phenomenon then burgeoning in Léopoldville, wherein youth orchestras cultivated devoted fan communities similar to contemporary fan clubs. OK Jazz was supported by two influential groups: a male fan club named AGES (Association des Gentlemen Sélectionnés) and a female counterpart known as La Mode. These fan clubs became central to the band's image and were frequently acknowledged in musical dedications. The 1957 track "Bana Ages", released as the B-side to "Aya la Mode", paid tribute to them. One prominent member of La Mode, Pauline Masouba, would later become Luambo's first wife. During this period, his nickname "Franco de Mi Amor" had become popular, as his rising appeal, especially among young female admirers, soon reached national proportions. This widespread acclaim was noted in an article published by the Agence Congolaise de Presse, in which then-Congolese information minister Jean Jacques Kande observed:

"In the city's most popular bars, he picks up his guitar, and hordes of young girls crowd around him, as if paying homage to their childlike spirit, giving him looks that could derail a speeding train. For Franco is an undisputed and undeniable master of the guitar..."

=== 1957–1961: Departures and first European performances ===
Later in 1957, Essous, Rossignol, and percussionist Pandy, all of whom were originally from Brazzaville, left OK Jazz to establish a new band, Rock-a-Mambo. It quickly gained prominence, releasing hit songs that rivaled and in some instances eclipsed the popularity of OK Jazz's output. Their success posed a challenge to Papadimitriou, who sent urgent telegrams to OK Jazz, then on tour in Brazzaville, urging them to produce competitive new material. Following a year-long stay in Brazzaville, the band returned to Léopoldville in early 1958. Shortly thereafter, Luambo was briefly incarcerated due to a traffic-related infraction. While imprisoned, he wrote the song "Mukoko", which was later proscribed by colonial authorities on the grounds of its perceived advocacy for decolonization. After his release, Luambo returned to music with renewed determination and was soon hailed as the "Sorcerer of the Guitar". By the end of the decade, his influence on Congolese popular music was so significant that guitarists were often identified with one of two dominant stylistic schools: the "OK Jazz School", centered around Luambo, and the "African Jazz School", centered around Dr. Nico.

In 1959, on the cusp of Congolese independence, Léopoldville experienced civil unrest. Amidst this turmoil, Brazzaville-born musicians Edo Ganga, Celestin Kouka, and bassist De La Lune left OK Jazz to join the newly formed Les Bantous de la Capitale. Longomba also departed after a dispute with the band's editor, who was a cousin of Papadimitriou. Longomba subsequently accepted an invitation from Le Grand Kallé to travel to Brussels, where Le Grand Kallé had been appointed to oversee the cultural program of the Belgo-Congolese Round Table Conference, which opened on 20 January 1960 and was central to the negotiations for Congolese independence. While in Brussels, African Jazz recorded the influential pan-African nationalist hits "Indépendance Cha Cha" and "Table Ronde", which gained widespread popularity in Africa. Logomba's departure was keenly felt by Luambo, then only 21, who admired him as OK Jazz's organizer. Although Luambo considered leaving to join him, his wife, Pauline, convinced him to remain and preserve the band's future.

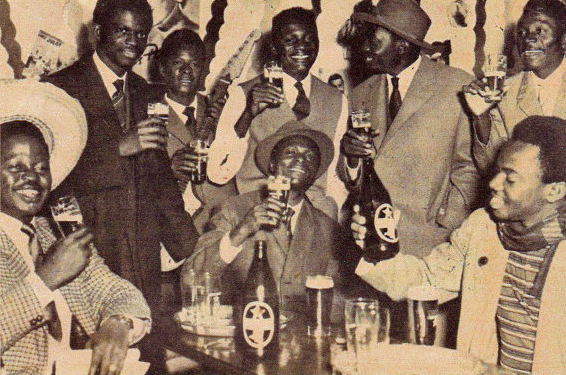
OK Jazz in Brussels, 1961

In 1960, Luambo ended his contract with Loningisa, and two years later, the label ceased operations. In 1961, OK Jazz became the second Congolese band to tour Brussels, following African Jazz's 1960 visit. They were subsequently invited to record there under the Surboum label, owned by Le Grand Kallé. They recorded the hits "La Mode Ya Puis Epiki Dalapo", "Amida Muziki Ya OK", "Nabanzi Zozo", "Jalousie Ya Nini Na Ngai", and "Como quere", among others. Le Grand Kallé reinvested the income from these Surboum releases to purchase the band's first full set of instruments. Inspired by this experience, Luambo founded his own label and publishing company, Epanza Makita, with political backing from Thomas Kanza, who helped secure favorable arrangements with the Belgian record company Fonior. This allowed Luambo to manage the production and distribution of his music while continuing to release records through Loningisa until it shut down the following year.

=== 1962–1969: Personnel changes, releases, performances, and internal crisis ===
Some people think they hear a Latin sound in our music... It only comes from the instrumentation, trumpets and so on. Maybe they are thinking of the horns. But the horns only play the vocal parts in our natural singing style. The melody follows the tonality of Lingala, the guitar parts are African and so is the rumba rhythm. Where is the Latin? Zairian music does not copy Cuban music. Some Cubans say it does, but we say their music follows ours. You know, our people went from Congo to Cuba long before we ever heard their music.

— Ewens, Graeme. Congo Colossus: Life and Legacy of Franco and OK Jazz. 1994, p. 74.

In August 1962, Longomba rejoined OK Jazz after spending two years with African Jazz and Negro Succès, and his return helped bring back former members Edo Ganga and De La Lune. The band's sound continued to evolve as Luambo recruited and mentored a new generation of musicians, most notably saxophonist Verckys Kiamuangana Mateta, who joined in 1963. Coming from a wealthy family, Mateta viewed OK Jazz as a launching pad for his broader ambitions, and his partnership with Luambo proved highly productive.

In February 1964, TPOK Jazz was officially registered as a company and adopted a formal administrative structure, with Joseph Emany as administrator, De La Lune as chef d'orchestre, Longomba as president, Ganga as secretary general, and Luambo as founder. That year, they signed a recording and distribution deal with Pathé Marconi in Paris, created a secondary entity called Boma Bango (meaning "kill them" in Lingala, a reference to rivals), and established another company, Lulonga, in Brazzaville (named after Luambo, Longomba, and Ganga). In August 1964, De La Lune and Ganga left the band following the expulsion of Congo-Brazzaville nationals mandated by Prime Minister Moïse Tshombe.

By 1965, Epanza Makita succeeded Les Éditions Populaires as the band's main label. That year, vocalist Jean Munsi Kwamy abruptly left OK Jazz and joined African Fiesta, co-founded by Tabu Ley Rochereau and Dr. Nico. Kwamy, who was romantically involved with Pauline Masouba's sister, reportedly developed an air of superiority toward his colleagues, which Luambo found indecent. According to singer Sam Mangwana, Luambo led with an emphasis on inclusivity and mutual respect. While he retained final authority, he sought to ensure that all members felt respected and involved. Unable to tolerate what he perceived as Kwamy's pomposity, Luambo confronted him, after which Kwamy cited a financial disagreement as the reason for his departure. Their feud later surfaced in music, with Kwamy releasing "Faux millionnaire", to which Luambo replied with the satirical song "Chicotte". Luambo also composed "Mino Ya Luambo Diamant" ("Luambo's teeth are diamonds"), which featured defiant lyrics. In 1966, OK Jazz achieved commercial success through a series of Pathé-produced releases, including "Didi", "Jean-Jean", and "Quatre boutons", a humorous song about a woman who draws the attention of her friends' lovers, much to their dismay. From 1–24 April that year, they represented Congo at the First World Festival of Negro Arts, held in Dakar, Senegal. Later that year, Luambo recruited Congolese-Brazzaville singer Youlou Mabiala, who joined in August.

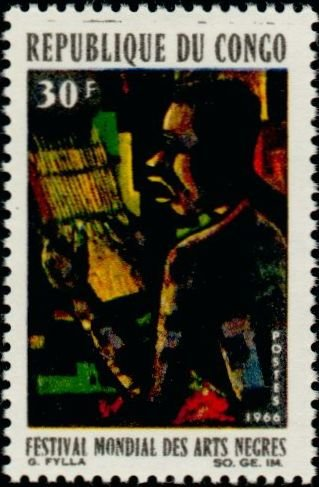
Congolese stamps for the Festival mondial des arts nègres, c. 1966

In 1967, Luambo became co-bandleader alongside Longomba, but significant challenges arose in April during his absence in Europe. A protest movement within the band led to a mass defection of musicians, who established a breakaway group named Orchestre Révolution. The splinter group included prominent former members like Joseph "Mujos" Mulama, Michel Boyibanda, and Kwamy on vocals; Welakingara "John Payne" and Armando "Brazzos" Mwango Fwadi-Maya on guitars; Tshamala "Picolo" on bass; Nicolas "Dessoin" Bosuma on percussion; Duclos on drums; Isaac Musekiwa on saxophone; and Christophe Djali on trumpet. This schism became one of the most significant upheavals in the band's history, although many of the musicians eventually returned to the fold. Later that year, Luambo's rapport with Mateta ended when he took legal action against the latter for failing to appear at a scheduled recording session. Mateta contended that his absence was a form of protest against Luambo's implication that he was involved in the theft of instruments in Brazzaville, for which their drummer Nestor had been imprisoned. Although the dispute was nominally resolved, residual animosity persisted.

In September 1968, Mateta and Mabiala announced the formation of a new label, Éditions Vévé, under which six records were released. Mateta asserted that these productions were independent of OK Jazz. Notable tracks from this venture included Mateta's "Mbula Ekoya Tokozongana" and "Nakopesa Yo Motema", Mabiala's "Billy Ya Ba Fiancés", and Simaro Lutumba's "Okokoma Mokrisstu". In December 1968, during a joint trip to Brussels, rumors began to surface that certain musicians under the band's exclusive contracts had clandestinely contributed to these recordings. Mateta had covertly transported the recordings to Europe, where he also recorded for Decca Records France. Luambo, who was unaware of the subterfuge, initially agreed to help with the project. However, Mateta eventually fled with Luambo's contacts and secured a publishing deal independently, receiving a substantial advance, which he used to purchase two automobiles. Once Luambo discovered the betrayal, he dismissed Mateta but later agreed to his return in exchange for 40 percent of the proceeds from the unauthorized recordings. This reconciliation was short-lived, and in February 1969, Mateta broke away from the band. Mabiala, however, chose to stay. During the late 1960s, the group supported nearly twenty people, while their main rival at the time was African Fiesta National.

=== 1970–1977: Politics, renaming, social commentary, and continental tours ===
In 1970, Luambo's political involvement deepened as Mobutu Sese Seko's government co-opted artists into political animation groups tasked with producing "wholesome" and patriotic works. The broadcasting of foreign music was banned, and the importation of musical equipment was heavily restricted. When commissioned by the regime to compose an anthem for the AZDA (Association Zairoise d'Automobiles), the successor to Difco as the Volkswagen dealership, Luambo acquiesced in exchange for considerable remuneration, a portion of which was allocated to procure vehicles for the musicians. The resulting song, "Azda", featuring the catchy refrain "Vé Wé, Vé Wé, Vé Wé, Vé Wé" (a phonetic nod to "VW" for Volkswagen), became a major hit and reached audiences as far as West Africa. However, this collaboration led to tensions between Luambo and Longomba, who opposed using the band for political propaganda and, while convalescing in Europe, was displeased to learn that Luambo had secured vehicles for the musicians without his involvement or consent. This dispute led to Longomba's departure and the formation of his band, Lovy du Zaïre, after which Luambo became the OK Jazz's sole leader. Around this time, the death of Luambo's younger brother, Bavon Marie-Marie, inspired him to compose the Kikongo ballad "Kinsiona" ("sorrow") in his honor. However, rumors began to circulate, alleging that Luambo had engaged in sacrificial rites involving his brother (like other parts of Africa, Kinshasa was rife with witchcraft accusations, especially against public figures such as Luambo). In 1971, OK Jazz was renamed Tout-Puissant Orchestre Kinois de Jazz (T.P.O.K. Jazz), meaning "the almighty Kinshasa jazz orchestra" in French. They then made their debut appearance in Tanzania in 1973, where an overly excited crowd caused a crush that killed two people.

In 1976, TPOK Jazz marked their 20th anniversary and reached the zenith of their pan-African popularity. They were noted for their vocal harmonies, elaborate stage costumes, choreographed performances, robust brass section, and Luambo's distinctive guitar work. They undertook extensive tours across the continent, performing in countries such as Gabon, Togo, Cameroon, Ivory Coast, Chad, and Sudan. According to Mangwana, the scale of TPOK Jazz's operations was unparalleled: "We had a sound system that weighed seven tons. Only institutions with significant resources could afford to carry it. That's why we mainly performed at major events organized by government ministries". The band also traveled with its own recording equipment. Live concerts were recorded by an on-tour sound engineer, and Luambo reviewed the recordings for potential album releases. When not performing, the band recorded music in informal settings, often in bars, rather than traditional studios. One such high-profile engagement was an official performance in Zambia, for which the band received a substantial fee. However, under Zairean law at the time, all foreign earnings had to be deposited in the national bank and converted into the national currency, the Zaïre. Luambo, who enjoyed privileged access to the presidency, adhered to the regulation without objection. Earnings from these tours financed the construction of the Un-Deux-Trois complex, the headquarters of Luambo's business empire, which included offices, a nightclub, a dance hall, a beverage depot, and other facilities. In 1977, the band participated in the Second World Black and African Festival of Arts and Culture, held in Lagos, Nigeria. That year also saw the release of "Radio Trottoir", composed by Simaro and featuring Mabiala on lead vocals, with Ntesa Dalienst in the chorus. The title, meaning "pavement radio", referred to a colloquial mode of informal communication in Central Africa, often associated with gossip and unverified rumors. "Radio Trottoir" recounts the story of a woman accusing others of ruining her marriage through defamatory gossip.

=== 1978–1986: Censorship, exile, international tours, success with Mario, and expansion ===
In 1978, Luambo faced imprisonment for six months due to the obscene nature of his songs "Hélène" and "Jackie", which featured explicit content. Despite this setback, he was released two months later, following public protests, and was honored by Mobutu Sese Seko for his musical contributions, although his reputation had been marred. Later that year, he relocated to Europe, joining his first wife and their children in Brussels. During his absence, TPOK Jazz was divided into two semi-autonomous factions. The senior group was led by Simaro, Josky Kiambukuta, and Ndombe Opetum, while the younger faction included rising talents such as vocalists Madilu System and Ntesa Dalienst as well as solo guitarist Thierry Mantuika. By the dawn of the 1980s, a significant portion of the band had relocated to Europe, fleeing the worsening political and economic conditions in Kinshasa. At the time, Mobutu's regime enacted policies like "Article 15", a clause that essentially urged citizens to survive on their own, given the state's failure to provide basic support. In June 1981, to celebrate the twenty-fifth anniversary of TPOK Jazz, Luambo released the four-volume album Keba na Matraque. It featured the hits "Bina Na Ngai Na Respect", "Bimansha", "Tuti", "Mandola", and "Sandoka".

In 1982, the headquarters of Luambo's record label, Visa 80, originally launched in Brussels in 1980, was relocated to Paris. However, administrative irregularities led to the band's forced expulsion from Belgium. According to French music journalist Vladimir Cagnolari, this followed complaints from local club owners that TPOK Jazz concerts attracted large audiences away from their establishments. Authorities discovered that the musicians' service passports did not permit them to work, and after a second offense, they were expelled permanently. Upon returning to Kinshasa, the city's ever-active "pavement radio" spread various rumors about the reasons for their deportation, including drug trafficking and political espionage. Luambo publicly refuted these allegations, even enlisting Papa Wemba to support his account during a televised interview on Office Zaïrois de Radio Télévision. As part of his comeback, Luambo performed a televised two-and-a-half-hour concert, during which he debuted "Ndunda", which SonoDisc misnamed "Kinshasa Makambo" ("troublesome Kinshasa"). The song, partly inspired by his 1971 track "Mobali Na Ngai Azali Etudiant Na M'Poto", expressed his loyalty to Kinshasa and frustration with detractors who spread malicious rumors.

In 1983, the album Chez Fabrice à Bruxelles was released under Luambo's Edipop Productions and featured the songs "Frein A Main", "5 Ans Ya Fabrice", and the hit "Non", which marked Madilu System's breakthrough. Although the track was initially intended for Kiambukuta, Luambo's longtime preferred vocalist, the decision to feature Madilu System was influenced by Luambo's wife. Later in 1983, he enlisted the band's younger contingent for TPOK Jazz's debut tour of the United States, which brought international acclaim through performances at the Lisner Auditorium in Washington, D.C., in November, and at New York's Manhattan Center in December. During the latter performance, TPOK Jazz played sets both with and without Luambo, who, according to the New York Times, "plucked out guitar chords with a raspy, slightly distorted tone that cut the music's sweetness and sharpened its syncopations". The same review noted that the band's guitar and horn arrangements sounded "less Western than ever as they ricocheted through the music". French music journalist François Bensignor reported that Madilu System assumed lead vocal duties on the tour and alleged that Thierry Mantuika played some of Luambo's guitar parts behind the scenes. Another major concert took place at Hammersmith Palais in London on 23 April 1984, followed by three consecutive nights at Kilimanjaro's Heritage Hall in Washington, DC, beginning on 4 November. In that same period, TPOK Jazz released the Edipop-produced hit "Mamou" (also titled "Tu Vois?"), which was written by Luambo and featured his vocals with Madilu System. TPOK Jazz also released Franco et le T.P. O.K. Jazz chez Rythmes et Musique à Paris, which included "Makambo Ezali Bourreau" and "12 600 Lettres". The latter addressed women mistreated by their sisters-in-law and drew on 12,600 letters Luambo had received from wives describing their experiences.

In 1985, TPOK Jazz released Mario, which debuted at number one on the African chart in Paris and sold nearly 10,000 copies in the city during its first week. The Luambo-written title track earned gold certification after selling more than 200,000 copies in Zaire. The song turned into one of Luambo's most significant hits, and critic Bensignor called it perhaps "Luambo's greatest masterpiece" and one of the "monuments of 20th-century Congolese music". That same year, TPOK Jazz returned to perform at the Manhattan Center with a full lineup of sixteen musicians, including singers, instrumentalists, and dancers. They followed with another three-hour performance at the Africa Center in London.

In 1986, Malage de Lugendo, a vocalist, was brought into the band, along with Kiesse Diambu ya Ntessa from Afrisa International and the female vocalist Jolie Detta. TPOK Jazz released the four-track LP Le Grand Maitre Franco et son Tout Puissant OK Jazz et Jolie Detta, featuring Luambo's breakout track "Massu", Thierry Mantuika's "Cherie Okamuisi Ngai", Luambo's "Layile", and Djodjo Ikomo's "Likambo Ya Somo Lumbe", featuring guest appearances from Simaro and vocals from Detta and de Lugendo. The LP synthesized Congolese rumba and soukous and garnered substantial acclaim, with "Massu" and "Layile" being hailed as some of the most memorable tracks in TPOK Jazz's discography. The same year, Luambo and TPOK Jazz went on an extensive tour of Kenya, where they performed in various cities, including Eldoret and Kisumu. Their hit single "La Vie Des Hommes", released by the Belgian imprint Choc (a subsidiary of African Sun Music), served as the title track of an album commemorating their 30th anniversary. The project also featured "Ida", with vocals by Luambo and de Lugendo, and "Celio", sung by Djo Mpoyi and de Lugendo.

=== 1987–1989: Final years ===
On 9 May 1987, Luambo and TPOK Jazz performed at the Africa Mama festival in Utrecht, Netherlands, which attracted a considerable audience. The concert featured an extensive lineup of 28 musicians, comprising seven singers, three dancers, eight guitarists, three trumpeters, three saxophonists, as well as percussionists. The performance was immortalized in a recording subsequently released as an album titled Franco: Still Alive, produced by former TPOK Jazz member Joseph Nganga and distributed internationally by Koch International. In August 1987, Franco and TPOK Jazz played at the fourth edition of the All-Africa Games at a sold-out Moi International Sports Centre in Nairobi, headlining alongside Zaïko Langa Langa, Anna Mwale, and Jermaine Jackson.

In September 1987, Luambo collaborated with singers Nana and Baniel for a stylistic project that, although brief, yielded two records that encapsulated the essence of Kinshasa's urban life. Notable tracks from this epoch included "C'est dur", "Je vis comme un PDG", "Les ont dit", "La vie d'une femme célibataire", and "Flora est une femme difficile". Luambo's long-standing collaborator Vicky Longomba died on 12 March 1988, leaving only Luambo and Bosuma Dessoin as the original band's co-founders. Luambo's final recording took place in Brussels in February 1989, where he contributed to Mangwana's seven-track album Forever, alongside session musicians and select TPOK Jazz members. Luambo's vocals and guitar feature on the hopeful opening track, "Toujours O.K.", while his guitar work also surfaces in the closing moments of another song, "Chérie B.B". He similarly played a subdued role on his own album Franco Joue avec Sam Mangwana, recorded with TPOK Jazz, where his impassioned vocals enliven the track "Lukoki", a song rooted in Kongo folklore. By September 1989, Luambo's health had begun to decline significantly, yet he continued to perform in Brussels, London, and Amsterdam, playing at Melkweg near Leidseplein on 22 September, before being hospitalized the next day.

== Politics ==
=== Early political involvement ===
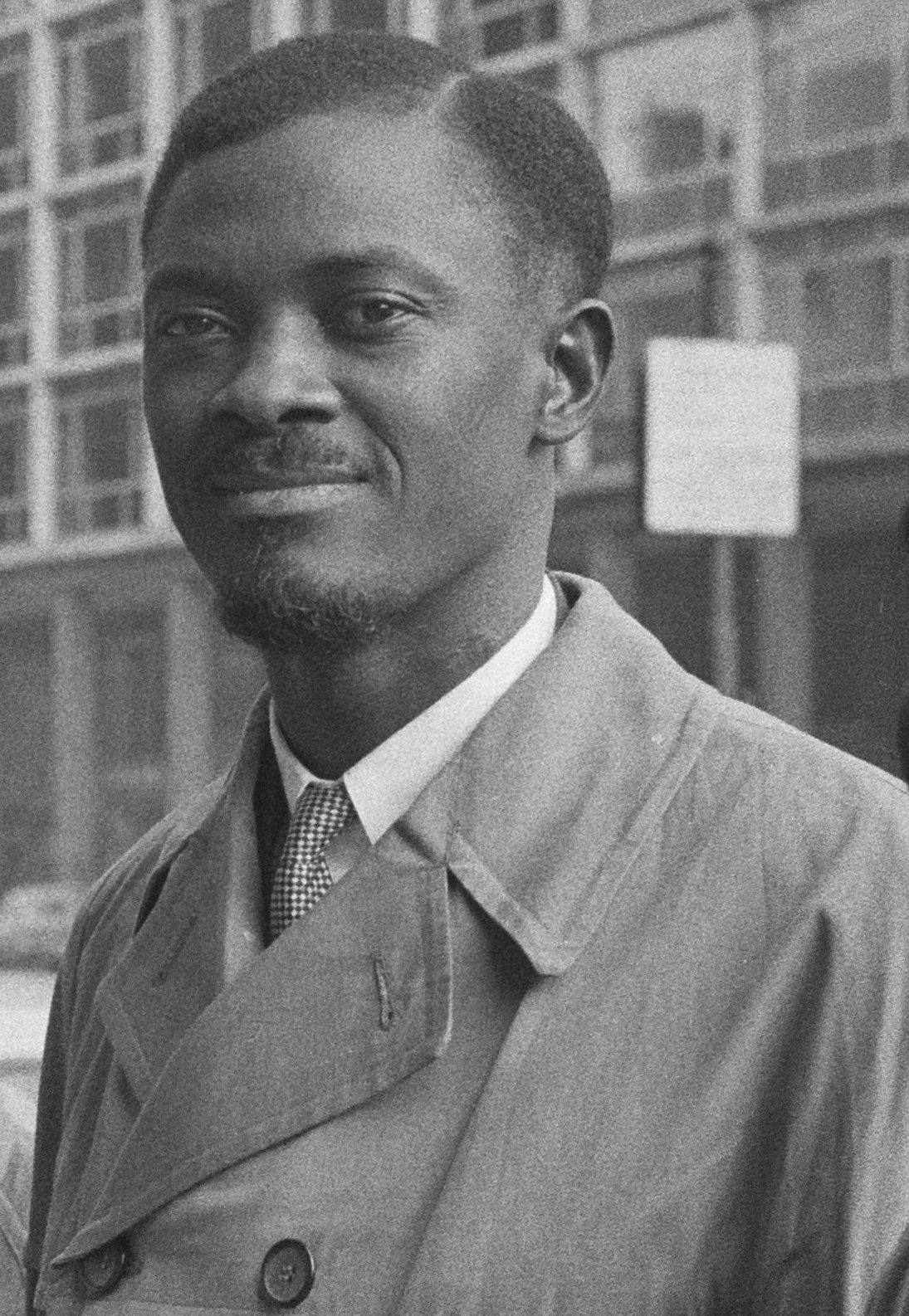
Patrice Lumumba in Brussels in 1960

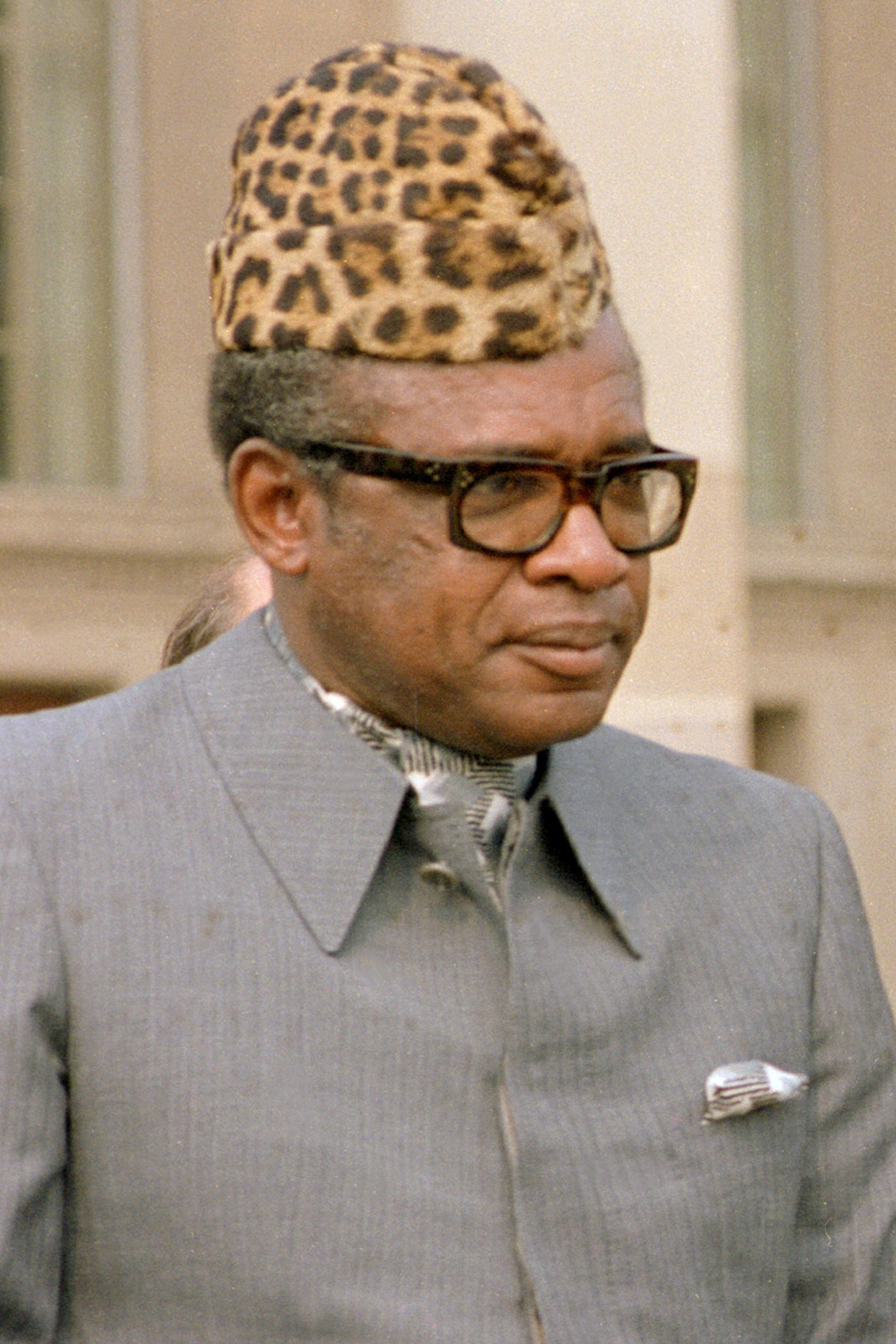
Mobutu Sese Seko sporting a typical abacost in 1983

Before aligning with Mobutu Sese Seko in the 1970s, Luambo was an ardent proponent of the then-Republic of the Congo's inaugural prime minister, Patrice Lumumba, whose assassination was orchestrated in a clandestine operation involving the CIA, Belgian authorities, and Mobutu. At the time, Mobutu, then a Chief of Staff of the Congolese National Army, had served as Lumumba's personal aide, before betraying him. Following Lumumba's assassination, Luambo composed the song "Liwa ya Lumumba" ("the death of Lumumba"), alternately titled "Liwa Ya Emery". Luambo then released the album Au Commandement, wherein the eponymous track celebrated Mobutu's ascent to power. It conveyed a hopeful sentiment, praising Lumumba while portraying Mobutu as a reincarnation of Lumumba's legacy.

In 1965, Mobutu seized power through a military coup, having initially pledged to relinquish control to a democratically elected government. However, it soon became clear that he had no intention of stepping down, and discontent swelled, particularly in Kinshasa. In a show of force, Mobutu orchestrated the public execution of five political dissidents, including Évariste Kimba and former ministers Jérôme Anany, Emmanuel Bamba, and André Mahamba, on Pentecost, in Matonge. The event was particularly significant as Mobutu, a Catholic, executed Bamba, a prominent Kimbanguist, a member of a traditional Kongolese religious movement. In response, Luambo composed the 1966 threnody "Luvumbu Ndoki", which drew on Kikongo folklore to indirectly criticize Mobutu's regime. The song's chants, interpreted as veiled critiques of Mobutu, led to its immediate ban, with copies confiscated from the marketplace. Luambo was subsequently detained by Mobutu's secret police and later released, after which he fled to Brazzaville to escape further persecution. Despite the ban, "Luvumbu Ndoki" became emblematic of the growing frustrations of the Congolese people under Mobutu's dictatorship, and the song was re-released by EMI-Pathé in 1967.

=== Authenticité ===
By the late 1960s, Mobutu started a cultural revolution to eradicate colonial legacies from Zairean society. In 1971, he renamed the country from Congo-Kinshasa to Zaire. He then propagated a forceful nationalist state ideology known as Authenticité, which sought to reappropriate and exalt indigenous culture while systematically eradicating colonial influence, thus creating a distinctly Zairean identity. At this time, Luambo changed his name to L'Okanga La Ndju Pene Luambo Luanzo Makiadi, and his music became an essential medium for disseminating Mobutu's political ideology, transforming him into a cultural icon and an advocate for the regime's agenda. To commemorate Authenticité, Luambo composed the song "Oya" ("identity"), in which he urged Zaireans to embrace their true heritage.

To promote his nationalist message, Mobutu enlisted Luambo and TPOK Jazz to perform on a nationwide propaganda tour. Clad in military fatigues, the band played ideological hymns to massive crowds across the country. Luambo's 1970 song "République du Zaire", written by Munsi Jean (Kwamy), endorsed Mobutu's renaming of the country, urging Zaireans to adopt the new national identity. An album sung by TPOK Jazz was released, titled Belela Authenticité Na Congress ya M.P.R., with its title track praising the concept of Authenticité and calling on the population to embrace Mobutu's cultural renaissance. The title track also echoed the nationalist sentiments of the era, which supported Mobutu's claims to leadership and positioning him as the "head of the family", a metaphor he used to describe his role as the unifying figure of Zaire.

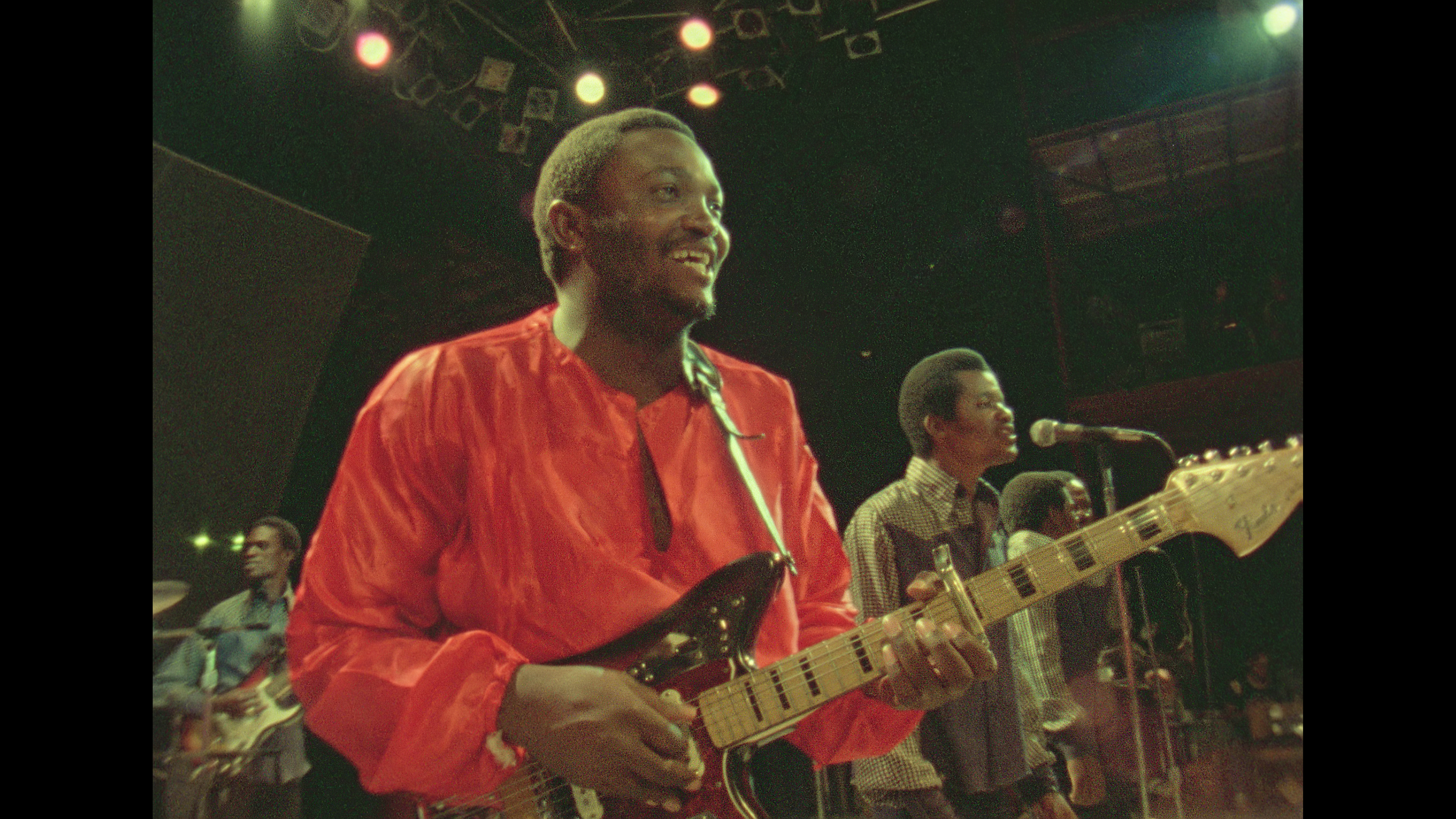
Luambo performing with TPOK Jazz at Zaire 74

During this period, Luambo portrayed himself as an observer of the nation's politics. In an interview, he articulated that while his lyrics touched on political themes, he did not consider himself a politician but rather a musician reflecting the nation's realities. However, Luambo's close association with Mobutu's regime belied this ostensibly neutral stance. He composed additional songs in support of Mobutu's policies, including "Cinq Ans Ekoki" ("five years have passed"), to commemorate Mobutu's fifth year in power. When Mobutu introduced the concept of Salongo (mandatory civic labor) in 1970, Luambo produced "Salongo alinga mosala" to promote the initiative. During this period, Luambo and TPOK Jazz performed regularly at Un-Deux-Trois Nightclub in Matonge, built on land gifted to Luambo by Mobutu. The club, which opened in 1974, became one of the most exclusive venues in Kinshasa. Mobutu's policies of nationalizing foreign-owned companies extended to Luambo as well, as he was granted control of Mazadis, a record-pressing company, to the dismay of smaller producers and musicians who accused Luambo of monopolizing access to the facility. TPOK Jazz also performed at numerous political events, most notably the Zaire 74 music festival, which was organized to promote the heavyweight boxing match between Muhammad Ali and George Foreman in Kinshasa. This event highlighted Zaire's international status, and Luambo performed alongside international artists like Miriam Makeba, James Brown, Etta James, Fania All-Stars, Bill Withers, the J.B.'s, B. B. King, Sister Sledge, and the Spinners.

Despite the outward appearance of national unity and cultural resurgence, Mobutu's regime was marked by endemic corruption, authoritarianism, and social injustices. The 1974 nationalization of small- and medium-sized businesses was disastrous and prompted the government to reverse course and adopt a mixed economy that returned 60% ownership of enterprises to their former proprietors. Nevertheless, embezzlement by high-ranking officials persisted, and abuses of power became widespread. Luambo responded to these conditions through increasingly critical and socially observant music, exemplified by his 1975 single "Matata Ya Mwasi Na Mobali Esilaka Te", which excoriated the misuse of elite influence, particularly those who exploited their positions to interfere in personal relationships. In "Nabala Ata Mbwa" ("why not marry a dog"), he satirized the collapse of traditional family structures, lampooning meddling in-laws and positing that a dog might offer more loyalty than a human spouse. In 1975, he released the album Dixième Anniversaire to commemorate Mobutu's decade in power, though he insisted his actions were driven by civic and patriotic duty rather than political interests. The reality, however, is that Luambo had inevitably become entangled in the political sphere, given the era's mandate that musicians align with government directives.

==== Imprisonment and redemption ====
In 1978, Luambo released the tracks "Hélène" and "Jackie" on cassette, which authorities deemed politically and morally subversive for containing explicit content. "Jackie", in particular, was accused of featuring perverse imagery, including lyrics describing a scene in which a character feeds excrement to his partner in a bowl of soup. Summoned by Attorney General Léon Kengo wa Dondo, Luambo defended the songs, claiming they contained nothing inappropriate. Authorities even called upon his mother, Mbonga Makiesse, for further scrutiny, much to Luambo's dismay. After listening to the songs, she reportedly reacted with shock, and Luambo was sentenced to six months' imprisonment. Ten of his musicians, many unrelated to the controversial content, were also sentenced to two months, including Papa Noël Nedule, Simaro Lutumba, Kapitena Kasongo, Gerry Dialungana, Flavien Makabi, Gégé Mangaya, Makonko "Makos" Kindudi, Isaac Musekiwa, Ntesa Dalienst, and Lola Checain. Dalienst later testified in court that his only contribution to the contentious material was a verse stating "Mwama oh, Mwama oh, Jacky, Kitoko na yo ya Nyama" ("oh this girl, Jacky, she is a natural beauty"). Some interpreted the term nyama ("meat") as an allusion to virginity and sexual deflowering. Luambo attempted to take sole responsibility but was unsuccessful. Despite this legal adversity, his relationship with Mobutu's regime remained largely unscathed, as he was released after serving only two months following a wave of public outcry, and he was later formally honored by Mobutu for his contributions to the nation's musical heritage, though his public image was somewhat tarnished by the incident.

Luambo's involvement in Mobutu's political propaganda became even more pronounced in the 1980s. In 1983, he collaborated with Tabu Ley Rochereau to release a series of albums, the most famous being Lettre À Monsieur Le Directeur Général (popularly known as "D.G"), with the title track delivering a pointed admonition to the heads of public enterprises, urging them to exercise discernment in evaluating the reports and information furnished by advisers, close associates, friends, acquaintances, and family members to avoid making arbitrary decisions or endorsing irregular practices. Although ostensibly directed at lower-level officials, many perceived the song as an implicit critique of Mobutu himself, as he had appointed these very figures. Despite this, Luambo continued to support Mobutu publicly, composing "Candidat Na Biso Mobutu" ("our candidate Mobutu") in 1984 to endorse the president's re-election bid, in which Mobutu ran unopposed. The lyrics implored the public to rally behind Mobutu's leadership, extolling his governance while ominously warning against dissent, metaphorically referring to Mobutu's opponents as "sorcerers". The song became immensely popular, earning Luambo a gold disc for selling over a million copies. However, despite this apparent camaraderie, Luambo's relationship with the regime soured in later years. The precise causes of this rift remain unclear, but it is believed that Luambo's increasing influence, coupled with Mobutu's growing paranoia, may have contributed to the tension.

== Illness and death ==
In early 1987, Luambo recorded one of his most impactful songs, "Attention Na Sida" ("Beware of AIDS"), from the eponymous album. At a time when AIDS was a relatively new and poorly understood disease, with limited public information provided by governments, the song served as a powerful and necessary public health message. It urged people to take the disease seriously, called on governments to educate the populace, and advocated for behavioral changes to curb the epidemic. The track, recorded in Brussels, featured Luambo accompanied by TPOK Jazz and the band Victoria Eleison, led by King Kester Emeneya. Notably, it re-used guitar arrangements and vocal melodies from Luambo's earlier 1978 hit "Jackie". "Attention Na Sida" was sung predominantly in French to reach a wider audience and diverged sharply from Luambo's typical musical subjects. Its guitar harmonies and driving percussion underpinned a fervent call to action, likened to an Old Testament prophet warning of impending judgment.

In early 1988, Luambo went to Brussels for medical tests to diagnose his worsening health. He had lost weight, and rumors about his illness abounded. In Kinshasa, reports of his death surfaced, citing possible causes such as bone cancer, kidney failure, and, most controversially, AIDS. In response, Luambo recorded "Les Rumeurs" and two other songs in Brussels in November. This session was issued as a compact disc in 1994 by SonoDisc, making it the sole official posthumous album by Luambo. He also contributed his final recording on Sam Mangwana's album Forever with TPOK Jazz in Brussels in February 1989. However, his condition continued to decline, and he was admitted to Mont-Godinne Hospital (now CHU UCLouvain Namur). He died there on 12 October 1989, at the age of 51. Although his illness was never officially confirmed, several reports indicated that AIDS was the likely cause of his death, a belief supported by multiple sources though never publicly acknowledged by Luambo himself. Some publications, such as The New Yorker, referred to it only as "an illness believed to be AIDS".

Luambo's body was repatriated to Kinshasa on 15 October 1989, where a requiem mass was held at the Cathedral of Notre Dame du Zaïre (now Cathédrale Notre-Dame du Congo) in Lingwala. During the ceremony, Reverend Father Ntoto honored Luambo, describing him not as a disruptive force but as "a voice of conscience". He was buried at Gombe Cemetery, a burial ground typically reserved for national heroes. Tributes were heard, including remarks from Minister of Culture and Arts Gérard Kamanda wa Kamanda, who praised Luambo's generosity, creative power, and central role in the cultural revolution. Mobutu declared four days of national mourning. A mausoleum was constructed over Luambo's gravesite, and in the months that followed, Avenue Bokassa in Kinshasa was officially renamed Avenue Luambo Makiadi Franco.

== Recorded output ==
It is difficult to summarize the enormous volume of recordings issued by Luambo (virtually all of them with TPOK Jazz). The range of estimates suggest both the size of, and the uncertainties about, his output. An often-cited number is a list of 84 albums compiled by Graeme Ewens in his 1994 biography of Luambo; this list does not include compilation albums that also have other performers, or OK Jazz tribute albums and compilations issued after Luambo's death (Ewens notes that this number "falls short of the 150 albums which Luambo claimed back in the mid-1980s, but no doubt some of those were collections of singles for the African market"). Ten albums on the list were issued in 1983 alone. Other statements include: "he released roughly 150 albums and three thousand songs, of which Luambo himself wrote about one thousand"; "Franco's prolific output amounted to T.P.O.K releasing two songs a week over his nearly 40-year career, which ultimately comprised a catalogue of some 1000 songs"; "With his band OK Jazz he released at least 400 singles (more than half later compiled onto LP or CD) ... Ewens lists 36 CDs; Asahi-net has 83"; and "from June 1956 to August 1961 the band recorded 320 tracks for the 78 rpm music label Loningisa".

As a rough explanation of its nature, in the 1950s and 1960s, Luambo and TPOK Jazz issued singles, either 78 rpm (1950s) or 45 rpm (1960s), as well as some albums that were compilations of singles, and in the 1970s and 1980s, they issued longer albums. All of this was done by a large number of record labels, in a variety of countries in Africa and Europe as well as in the United States. In the 1990s, many of the albums were reissued in CD form by various record labels but haphazardly reorganized, often combining various parts of multiple albums onto single CDs. Since 2000, several compilations have been issued, collecting aspects of Luambo's work, most notably Francophonic, a pair of two-CD sets of highlights issued by Stern's in 2007 and 2009 and spanning Luambo's entire career. Through 2020, the Planet Ilunga record label has still been able to issue (on vinyl and digitally) compilations that include tracks that had never been reissued since their original release as singles.

== Musical style, critical evaluations, and significance ==
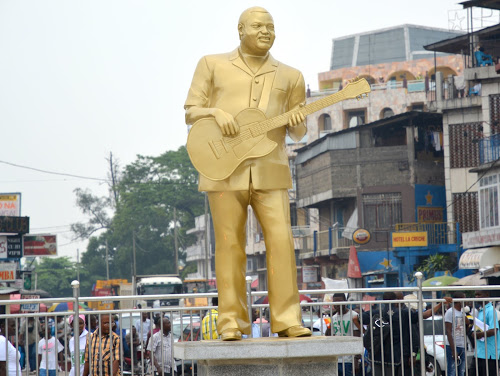
A statue of Luambo unveiled in Kinshasa in 2015

Luambo's guitar playing was unlike that of bluesmen such as Muddy Waters or rock and rollers like Chuck Berry. Instead of raw, single-note lines, Luambo built his band's style around crisp open chords, often of only two notes, which "bounced around the beat". The use of major thirds and sixths, as well as other consonant intervals, became a defining feature of his style, which thus provided a harmony-driven foundation rather than the blues-based tension often found in rock and roll.

Luambo's music often relied on huge ensembles, with as many as six vocalists and several guitarists. According to a description, "horns might engage in an upbeat dialogue with the guitar, or set up hypnotic vamps that carried the song forward as on the crest of a wave", while percussion parts are "a cushion supporting the band, rather than a prod to raise the energy level". His sound was connected to what musicologist Bob W. White described as the ondemba tradition, rhythmic, repetitive, and visceral, distinct from the more sophisticated and romantic fiesta style favored by contemporaries like Tabu Ley Rochereau and Papa Wemba. Though Luambo did not invent the sebene, he revolutionized its placement within his songs by shifting it from its traditional position in the middle of the composition to the end and "employing a distinctive thumb-and-forefinger picking style instead of a plectrum, creating a mesmerising sonic mirage of two intertwining guitar lines". This complemented his already guitar-heavy ensemble, which included bass, rhythm, lead, and mi-solo, a bridge, often played by Luambo, that connected the high-pitched lead guitar with the low-register rhythm guitar. By the late 1970s and early 1980s, Luambo began to experiment with longer song structures, with some pieces, such as the 18-minute "Bina Na Ngai Na Respect", becoming iconic for their musical ingenuity and their social message.

Luambo was a member for 33 years, from its founding in 1956 until his death in 1989, of TPOK Jazz, which has been called "arguably the most influential African band of the second half of the 20th century". and he was its co-leader or sole leader for most of that period.

He is commonly described as the preeminent African musical figure of the 20th century. For example, world music expert Alistair Johnston calls him "the giant of 20th century African music". A reviewer in The Guardian wrote that Luambo "was widely recognized as the continent's greatest musician, back in the years before Ali Farka Touré or Toumani Diabaté". Ronnie Graham, in his encyclopedic 1988 Da Capo Guide to Contemporary African Music, wrote that "Franco is beyond doubt Africa's most popular and influential musician". This is in addition to listing Luambo first in his book's rank-ordered section on Congo and Zaire, and putting on the book's cover, to represent African music, a waist-up photo of Luambo playing guitar.

== Personal life ==
=== Family and relationships ===
Luambo was married twice and is reported to have fathered 18 children, 17 of whom were daughters, with 14 different women. One of his most prominent early relationships was with Marie-José Kenge, who is widely believed to be his first wife. Known in Kinshasa as "Majos", she was a central figure in Luambo's youth. Their relationship, described by contemporaries as intensely affectionate, ended abruptly when Kenge left him, and, according to biographer Raoul Yema (Franco: Le Grand Maître), this breakup influenced Luambo's views on women and interpersonal relationships and marked the beginning of his often critical lyrical portrayals of women and a more cynical worldview. He later commemorated this period through the compositions "Kenge Okeyi Elaka Te" (1957), written after their separation; "Mami Majos" (1958), which reminisces about their happier times; and "Mosala Mibali Ya Bato" (1959).

Another woman cited as one of Luambo's wives is Pauline Masouba. According to French music journalist François Bensignor, Masouba was a member of La Mode, a prominent female fan club that supported OK Jazz during the 1950s. Bensignor presented Masouba as Luambo's first official wife and wrote that by 1978, he had joined her and their children in Brussels.

=== Football administration ===
Luambo served three terms as president of AS Vita Club's management committee: from 1967 to 1969, from 1970 to 1973, and from June 1983 to January 1984. During his first two terms, his administration oversaw the recruitment of younger players, including Kembo Uba Kembo, Mayaula Mayoni, Lobilo Boba, Gilbert Makani Tondo (also known as Gilbert Makani Ntondo), Jean Adélard Mayanga Maku, and Luambo appointed French diplomat Desarcre as the club's coach. In 1971, Vita Club won its first national championship after defeating Tout Violent Tshipepele of Kananga 2–0, and retained the title in 1972 and 1973.

In 1973, Luambo was succeeded by his deputy, Simon Opango Ibombo, under whom Vita Club won the African Cup of Champions Clubs, the predecessor of the CAF Champions League. Although the continental title came after Luambo left office, Congolese sports journalist François Siki Ntetani credited his administration with helping lay the foundation for Vita Club's national and continental successes.

== Selected discography ==
This is a very preliminary, partial list.

| Year | Album |
|---|---|
| 1969 | Franco & Orchestre O.K. Jazz* – L'Afrique Danse No. 6 |
| 1973 | Franco & OK Jazz* – Franco & L'O.K. Jazz |
| 1974 | Franco Et L'Orchestre T.P.O.K. Jazz* – Untitled |
| 1978 | "Franco" Luambo Makiadi* & His O.K. Jazz* – Live Recording of the Afro European Tour Volume 1 |
| 1978 | "Franco" Luambo Makiadi* & His O.K Jazz* – Live Recording of the Afro European Tour Volume 2 |
| 1979 | Luambo Makiadi Franco & l'Orchestre T.P. O.K. Jazz |
| 1980 | Franco & le T.P. O.K. Jazz a Paris Vol 1 |
| 1980 | Franco et Le T.P.O.K. Jazz – A Bruxelles, On Entre O.K. On Sort K.O. |
| 1980 | Franco et le T.P. O.K. Jazz – En Colere Vol 1 |
| 1980 | Franco et le T.P. O.K. Jazz – En Colere Vol 2 |
| 1980 | Tonton Franco et le T.P. O.K. Jazz – 6 Juin 1956 – 6 Juin 1980 24 Ans D'Age |
| 1981 | Le Quart De Siècle de Franco De Mi Amor le T.P.O.K. Jazz – Volume 1 – Volume 4 (Keba Na Matraque) |
| 1982 | Franco et le T.P. O.K. Jazz – Disque D'Or Et Maracas D'Or On Entre OK On Sort KO |
| 1982 | L'Alliance de L'Annee 1982 Franco et Sam Mangwana avec le T.P. O.K. Jazz – Spécial Maracas D'Or |
| 1982 | Franco et le T.P. O.K. Jazz – À 0 Heure Chez 1-2-3 Face A Face |
| 1983 | Franco et le T.P. O.K. Jazz – Chez Safari Club de Bruxelles (On Entre OK On Sort KO) |
| 1983 | Franco et le T.P. O.K. Jazz – Chez Fabrice a Bruxelles (Mibali Bokanga Ba Freins a Main) |
| 1984 | Franco et le T.P. O.K. Jazz – Chantent Tres Impoli (Mpo Na Nini Ozalaka Tres...?) |
| 1984 | Franco et le T.P. O.K. Jazz – À l'Anciènne Belgique |
| 1984 | Luambo Makiadi et le T.P. O.K. Jazz – Chantent Candidat Na Biso Mobutu (Ganga Mpe Belela Kombo Ya Mobutu) |
| 1985 | Franco & le T.P. O.K. Jazz – Le F.C. 105 de Libreville (L'équipe des grandes suprises) |
| 1985 | Le Grand Maitre Franco et son le T.P. O.K. Jazz – Dans Mario (LP) CHOC CHOC CHOC 004 |
| 1985 | Le Grand Maitre Franco et son le T.P. O.K. Jazz – Dans Mario (LP) CHOC CHOC CHOC 005 |
| 1985 | African Record Center Presente le Tout Puissant O.K. Jazz – Dans Lela Ngai Na Mosika |
| 1986 | Le Grand Maitre Franco et son Tout Puissant O.K. Jazz et Jolie Detta |
| 1986 | Le Grand Maitre Franco et Ses Stars du T.P. O.K. Jazz – À Nairobi |
| 1986 | Franco & Le T.P.O.K. Jazz – Choc Choc Choc La Vie Des Hommes – Ida – Celio (30 Ans De Carrière – 6 Juin 1956 – 6 Juin 1986) |
| 1986 | Le T.P. O.K. Jazz – Special 30 Ans Par Le Poete Lutumba Simaro & Le Grand Maitre Franco |
| 1987 | Franco et le T.P. O.K. Jazz – Bois Noir |
| 1987 | Franco Et Le T.P.O.K. Jazz – L'Animation Non Stop |
| 1987 | Le Grand Maitre Franco et Son T.P. O.K. Jazz – Ekaba Kaba (Yo Moko Okabeli Ngai Ye Oh) |
| 1987 | Le Grand Maitre Franco* – Baniel – Nana et le T.P.O.K. Jazz* – Les "On Dit" |
| 1987 | Le Grand Maitre Franco – Interpelle la Societe dans Attention na SIDA (Franco S'insurge Contre...Le SIDA) |
| 1988 | Le Grand Maitre Franco – Pepe Ndombe et le T.P. O.K. Jazz attaquent Anjela |
| 1988 | Le Grand Maitre Franco avec Ntesa Dalienst et le T.P. O.K. Jazz – Dans Mamie Zou, Batandeli Ngai Mitambo, Dodo, Na Lobi Na Ngai Rien |
| 1988 | Le Grand Maitre Franco et le T.P. O.K. Jazz – Dans La Réponse de Mario (On Entre OK On Sort KO) |
| 1988 | Le Grand Maitre Franco – Nana – Baniel et le T.P. O.K. Jazz – Dans Cherche Une Maison À Louer Pour Moi Cherie (On Entre On Sort KO) |
| 1988 | Franco Joue Avec Sam Mangwana |
| 1989 | Sam Mangwana, Franco et T.P. O.K. Jazz FOREVER |

Compilation albums:

| Year | Album |
|---|---|
| 1993 | Franco & son T.P.O.K. Jazz – 3eme Anniversaire de la Mort du Grand Maitre Yorgho |
| 2001 | Franco – The Rough Guide to Franco: Africa's Legendary Guitar Maestro |
| 2007 | Franco & le T.P.O.K. Jazz – Francophonic: A Retrospective Vol. 1 1953–1980 |
| 2009 | Franco & le T.P.O.K. Jazz – Francophonic: A Retrospective, Vol. 2: 1980–1989 |
| 2017 | O.K. Jazz – The Loningisa Years 1956–1961 |
| 2020 | Franco & l'Orchestre O.K. Jazz – La Rumba de mi Vida |
| 2020 | O.K. Jazz – Pas Un Pas Sans... The Boleros of O.K. Jazz 1957–77 |
