= Chinese people in the Democratic Republic of the Congo =

Les Chinois en République démocratique du Congo
- (China) (Democratic Republic of the Congo)
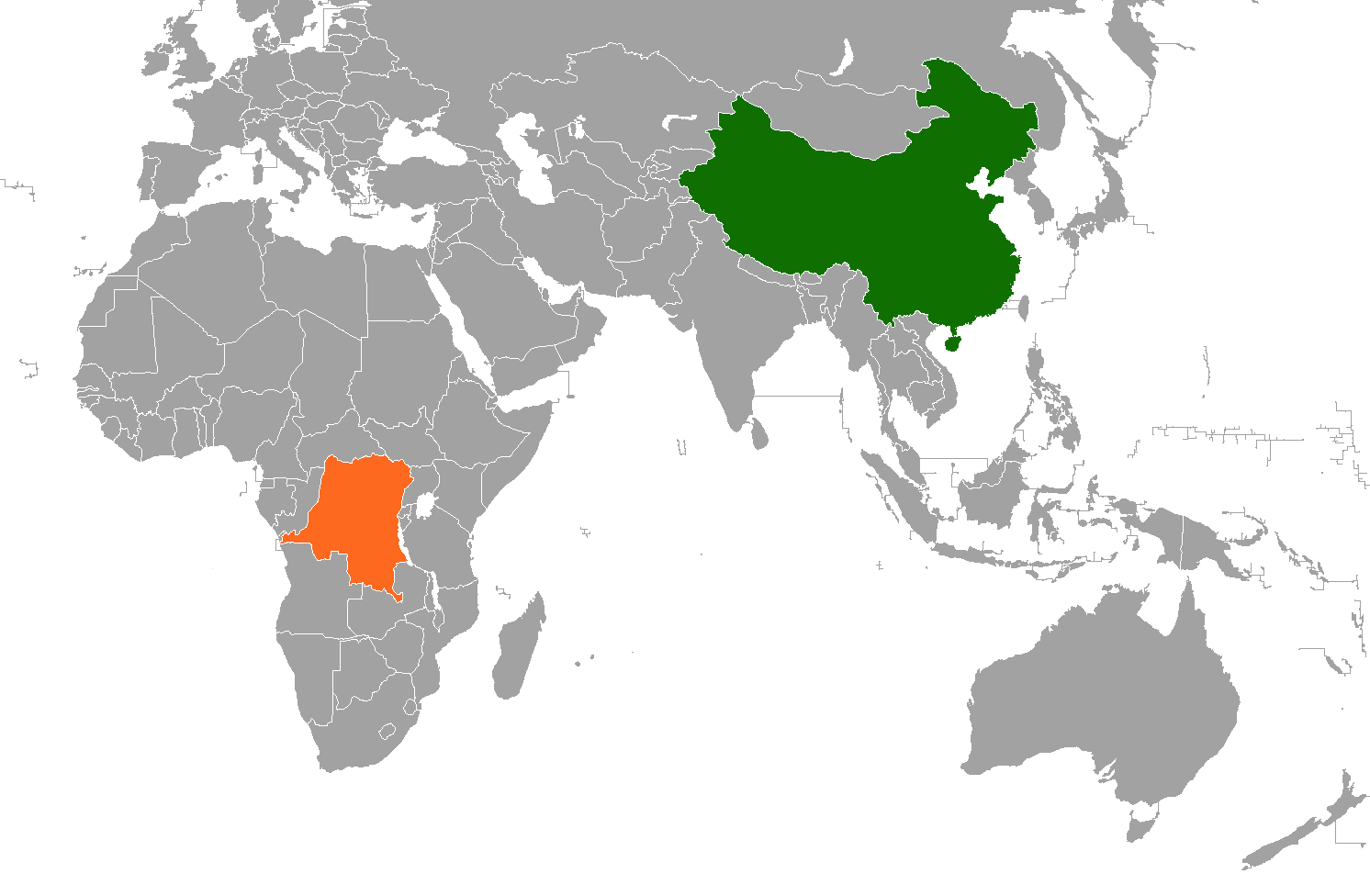

Total population
- 5,000–50,000 (2015)

Regions with significant populations
- Kinshasa, Katanga

Languages
- Mandarin, French, Lingala and other Languages of the Democratic Republic of the Congo

Religion
- Irreligion, Buddhism, minority of Roman Catholicism

Related ethnic groups
- Overseas Chinese

In the Democratic Republic of the Congo (DRC) there is a significant community of Chinese migrants located in the capital of Kinshasa and the mineral rich southern Haut-Katanga Province. According to official figures from the Chinese embassy, there are 5,000 Chinese living in the DR Congo, though the actual number is believed to be far higher. More recent estimates vary from 5,000 to 50,000. The mining industry of the Democratic Republic of the Congo is a main reason for Chinese people moving to the DRC.

== Business ==
Business links, both by individual entrepreneurs and state owned enterprises, has brought Chinese migration to the DRC.

The first wave of migrants were individuals who opened stores, restaurants, and private medical clinics. Chinese run stores in Kinshasa are typically scattered across neighborhoods and are not concentrated in any Chinatown. The stores carry a range of household goods and change money.

Some small scale entrepreneurs are in mining. In Katanga Province 60 of the 75 mineral processing plants are owned by Chinese entrepreneurs. Chinese employers have been criticized for their use of child labor and lack of health and safety standards.

Major deals have been signed by Chinese state owned companies and the DRC government. In 2012, Chinese investors and the Export-Import Bank of China offered to build $6 billion worth of infrastructure as part of a loan backed by collateral in mineral rights. These state owned enterprises have brought Chinese employees to the country.

== Anti-Chinese violence ==
Congolese mobs have attacked Chinese businesses on at least two occasions. In December 2010, local team TP Mazembe lost to Italian club Inter Milan. Mobs in Lubumbashi were angered by the calls made by a Japanese referee who was mistaken for Chinese, provoking attacks on Chinese businesses in the city.

During protests in January 2015 against the government of Joseph Kabila, Chinese businesses in the Kinshasa neighborhoods of Ngaba and Kalamu were targeted for destruction. An Agence France-Presse article on the attacks reported the motivation for violence was both resentment by local businesses that had difficulty competing against the low prices of Chinese run stores and association by rioters of Chinese nationals running stores with investment deals concluded by Chinese companies and the government.
