= Matongé =

Matongé, Matongué or Matonge may refer to:

- Matongé (Kinshasa), an area of Kinshasa, Democratic Republic of the Congo
- Matongé (Ixelles), a part of the municipality of Ixelles in Brussels, Belgium known for its Congolese community
