= 2020 Congolese protests =

2020 protests in Congo

- Date: 2020
- Location: DR Congo
- Goals: Resignation of Felix Tshisekedi
- Methods: Protests; Demonstrations

Parties
Opposition: Civilian protesters; Opposition parties; Mobutuists	Government: Union for Democracy and Social Progress

The 2020 Congolese protests was a series of anti-government protests and nationwide strikes against president Felix Tshisekedi and his appointment of a new judge of the Electoral Commission. Massive labour protests and increasingly violent street demonstrations were characterised by growing opposition protests and riots in Kinshasa and Katanga, the epicentre of the uprising. The mass protests led to the deaths of 1 protester.

== See also ==
- 19 January 2015 DRC protests
- December 2016 Congolese protests
