= Statue of Franco Luambo =

Musician statue in Kalamu, Kinshasa

Statue de Franco Luambo
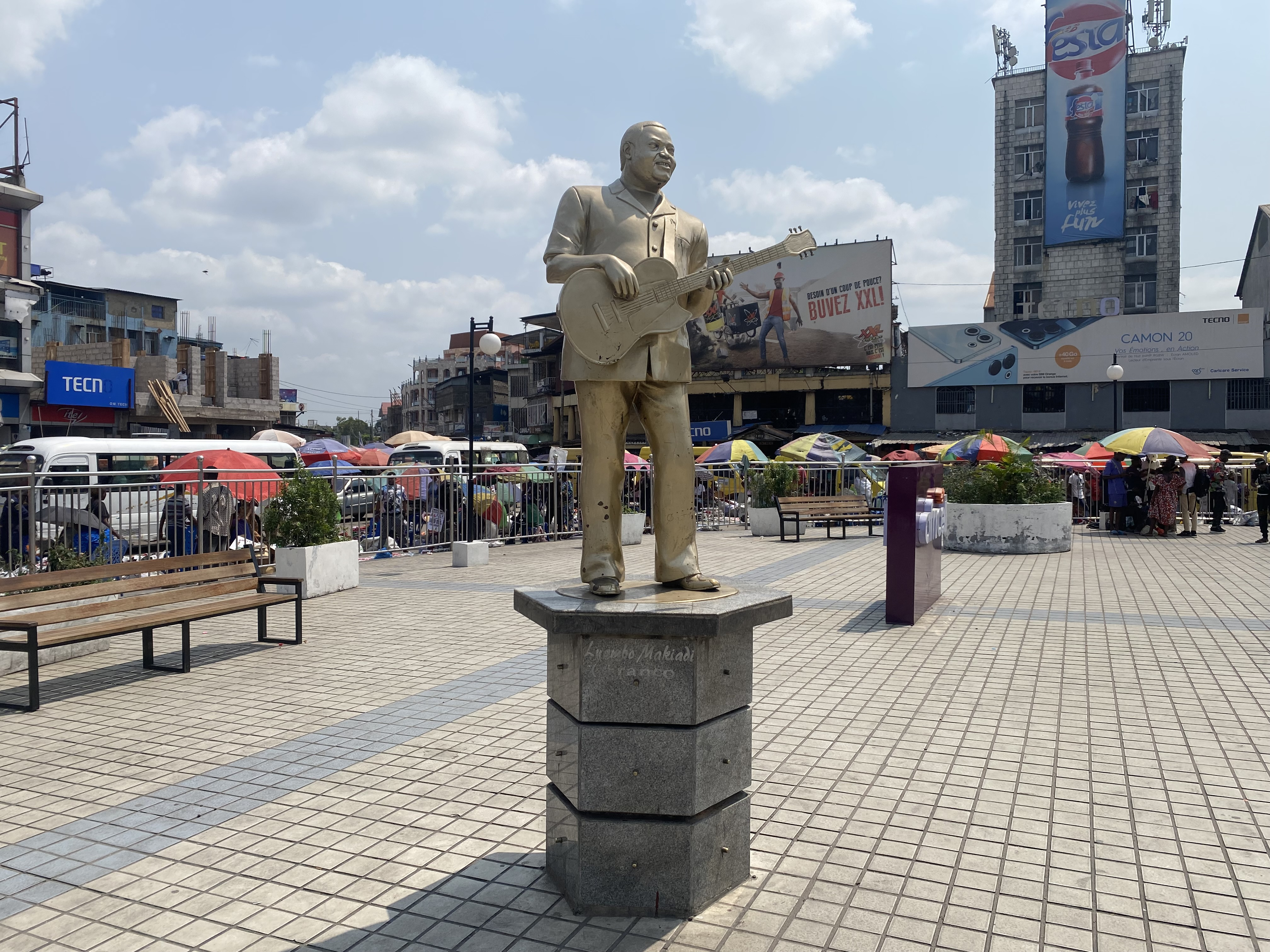
- Location: Place des Artistes, Matonge, Kalamu, Kinshasa
- Designer: Alfred Liyolo Limbe M'Puanga
- Builder: Alfred Liyolo Limbe M'Puanga
- Type: Statue
- Height: 2.97 m (9 ft 9 in)
- Weight: 400 kg (880 lb)
- Opening date: 12 October 2015; 10 years ago

The Statue of Franco Luambo (French: Statue de Franco Luambo) is a 2.97-meter-tall bronze sculpture depicting Congolese rumba musician Franco Luambo designed by Congolese sculptor Alfred Liyolo Limbe M'Puanga. Strategically located in the Kalamu commune at the Place des Artistes, within the Matonge neighborhood, the statue was inaugurated by Prime Minister Matata Ponyo Mapon on 12 October 2015.

== Description ==
Standing 1.87 meters with a base of 1.10 meters, reaching a total of 2.97 meters, the sculpture weighs 400 kilograms and portrays him in a quintessentially classic pose holding a guitar. Congolese sculptor Alfred Liyolo Limbe M'Puanga, who also sculpted the monumental Patrice Lumumba statue outside the prime minister's office in Kinshasa, depicts Franco Luambo mid-performance with fingers poised over the guitar strings. Next to the statue, large posters offer a biographical exploration of Franco's life and achievements. The entire installation is enclosed with a metallic fence perimeter.

== Unveiling and reception ==
On 12 October 2015, marking 26 years since Franco's death on 12 October 1989 in Namur, Belgium, the statue's unveiling was a centerpiece of an extensive commemorative event. The day's solemn ceremonies began with a requiem mass at St. Joseph Church in the Matonge neighborhood, followed by the presentation of the Opéra-Ballet "Franco Immortel" at the Cité de l'Union Africaine. The statue's unveiling was held at the Place des Artistes in the Kalamu commune in Matonge, where prominent political figures, Franco's former bandmates, various musicians, and dedicated fans gathered to pay tribute to his legacy.

Reactions to the statue's aesthetic varied, with some critics disputing the precision of Franco's depiction, while others lauded the statue as a significant government initiative to support the arts and recognize Congolese musical icons. In a congratulatory tweet, Prime Minister Matata Ponyo Mapon praised the monument as "a symbol of rumba music". Elvis Mutiri wa Bashara, Minister of Tourism and Culture, extolled Franco as "a phenomenal artist, challenger, provocateur, and humorist", lauding his music for embodying the most sublime artistic essence that elevates the Congolese national identity and subsequently urged Prime Minister Mapon to relay gratitude to President Joseph Kabila for commissioning the statue. Verckys Kiamuangana Mateta, chairperson of SOCODA (Société Congolaise des Droits d'Auteur et des Droits Voisins), and a former prominent member of Franco's band OK Jazz expressed profound appreciation, stating, "We thank the Head of State for this gesture which is so important for us. We hope that this type of event will also extend to other artists like Kallé Jeff who was one of the leading figures of the Fiesta style".
