= Carbone Beni =

Congolese pro-democracy activist (born 1985)

- Born: Carbone Beni wa Beya; August 15, 1985 (age 41); Kinshasa, Zaire
- Occupations: human rights defender, social activist
- Known for: Prodemocracy fighter
- Website: www.carbonebeni.com

Carbone Beni, by his full name Carbone Beni wa Beya, is a human rights defender, Congolese pro-democracy activist and co-founder of the citizens' movement Filimbi.

== Biography ==
Carbone Beni was born on August 15, 1985, in Kinshasa, Zaire. He was educated in private Congolese establishments, notably at the Les Petites Disciples High school in the residential area of the municipality of Limete. In 2014, after obtaining a high school diploma, he continued his studies in information and communication technologies at the Technological University of Bel Campus, then a bachelor's degree in Business Administration at the Canadian University at Congo.

In 2015, Carbone Beni co-founded the citizens' movement "Filimbi", a word of Swahili origin which means "whistle". This movement aims to increase the citizen participation of young Congolese in the democratic process. It is made up of cells throughout the national territory called "Sinzile" in Lingala which means "sentinel". The movement rose to prominence during the 19 January 2015 DRC protests against the third term of former President Joseph Kabila in power since 2001 and the 2016 political crisis in the Democratic Republic of the Congo.

== Court cases ==
In December 2016, Carbone Beni was at the heart of the great anti-Kabila mobilization for the march of Catholic Christians on December 31, 2017, initiated by the Lay Coordinating Committee. He was brutally arrested alongside other four of his comrades, said Human Rights Watch Central Africa director Ida Sawyer.

He was then detained for more than nine months in the dungeon of the National Intelligence Agency (ANR) in Kinshasa, before being officially indicted on September 26 for "undermining the internal security of the State", "offending the head of state", and "publication and distribution of subversive writings". They were sentenced to twelve months in prison by the Gombe Peace Tribunal in Kinshasa, then released on December 25, 2018.
