= December 2016 Congolese protests =

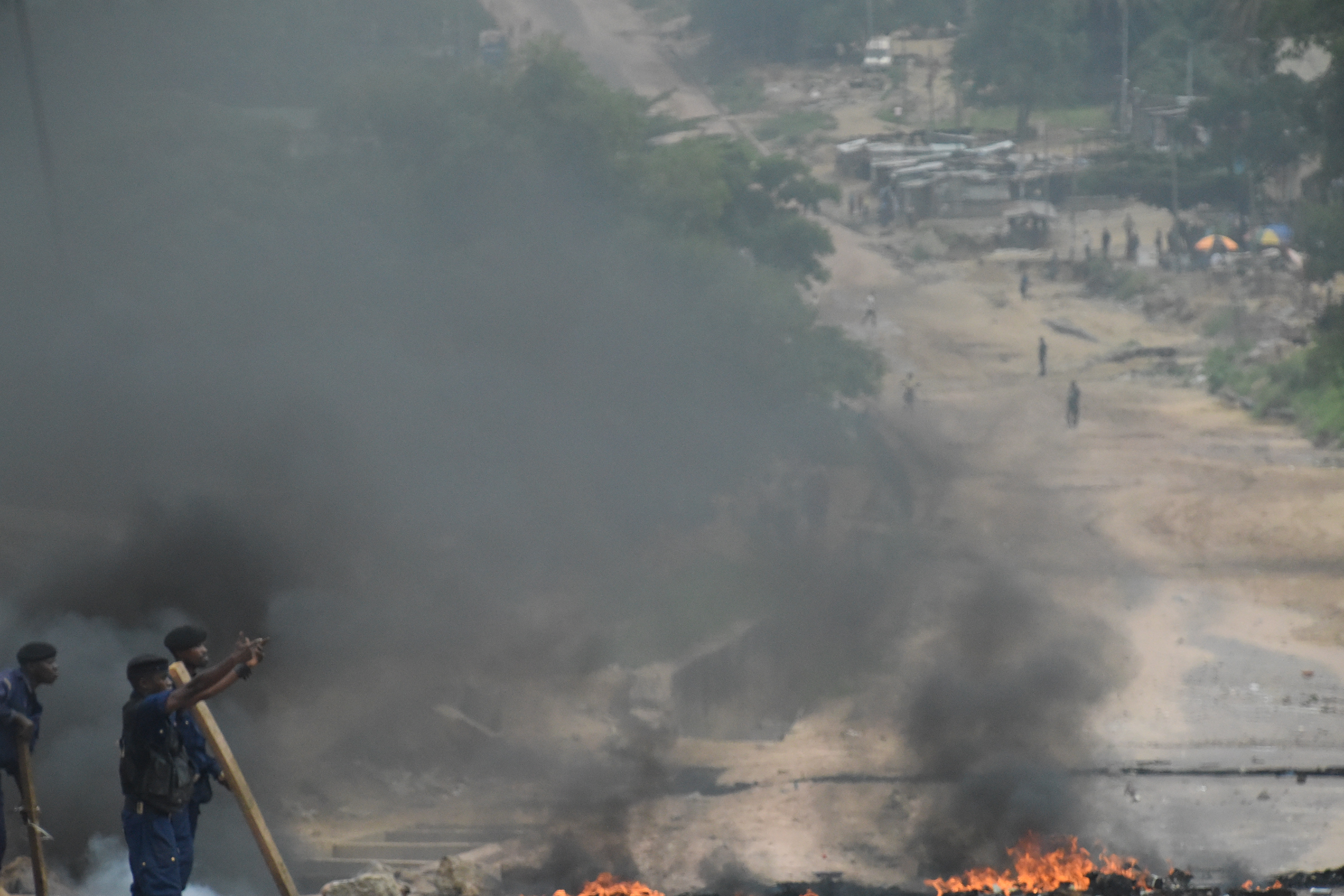
- Streets of Kinshasa during the protests
- Date: 14–23 December 2016
- Location: Boma, Goma, Kinshasa, Lubumbashi, Matadi Pretoria, Brussels
- Caused by: President Joseph Kabila refuses to leave power following completion of his term in office.
- Goals: Discontinuation of the president's term; Resignation of Joseph Kabila
- Methods: Protests; Demonstrations
- Result: Main opposition and Kabila regime agree to a deal. Kabila will not alter the constitution and will leave office before the end of 2017.

Parties
Opposition: Civilian protesters; Opposition parties	Government: Alliance of the Presidential Majority; People's Party for Reconstruction and Democracy; Congolese National Police

Lead figures
Non-centralized leadership	Joseph Kabila (President of Congo); Nzanga Mobutu; Antoine Gizenga; Pierre Syakasighe; André-Philippe Futa; Olivier Kamitatu Etsu

Casualties
- Death: 40
- Injuries: dozens
- Detained: 460

On 20 December 2016 the Democratic Republic of the Congo's president, Joseph Kabila, announced that he would not leave office despite the end of his constitutional term. Protests subsequently broke out across the country, which had never had a peaceful transfer of power since it gained independence in 1960. The protests were met with the government's blocking of social media, and violence from security forces which left dozens dead. Foreign governments condemned the attacks against protesters.

On 23 December an agreement was proposed between the main opposition group and the Kabila led-government under which the latter agreed not to alter the constitution and to leave office before the end of 2017. Under the agreement opposition leader Étienne Tshisekedi will oversee that the deal is implemented and the country's Prime Minister will be appointed by the opposition.

== Background ==
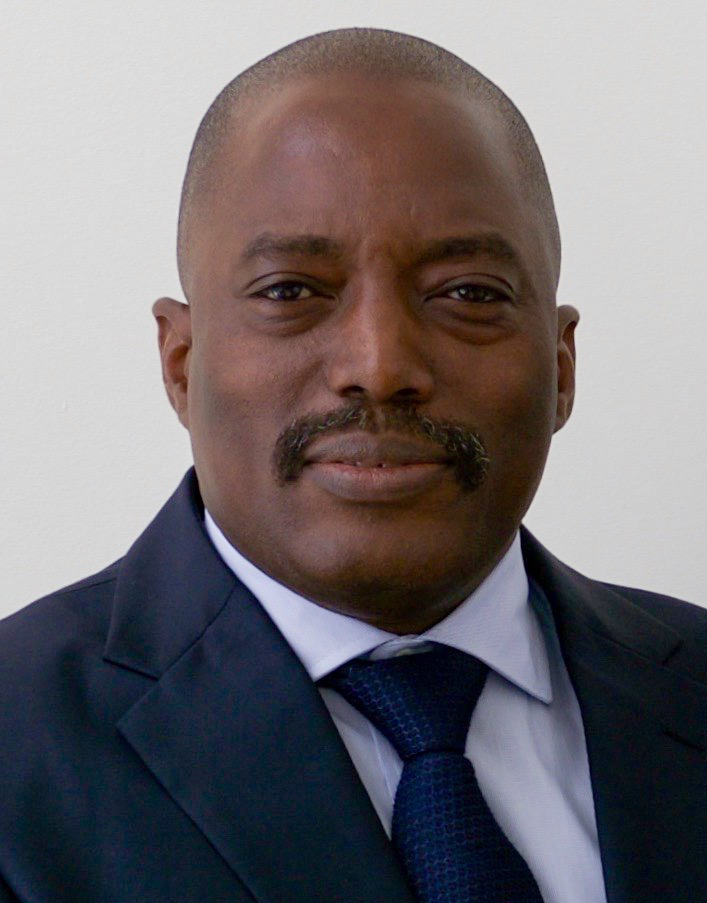
Joseph Kabila (as seen in April 2016)

In the wake of the 2014 Burkinabé uprising, the Democratic Republic of the Congo experienced a series of protests (e.g. the 2015 Congolese protests) in which Congolese citizens demanded that President Joseph Kabila not alter the presidential term limits in the country's constitution so that he could run for another term in office and not delay the country's planned elections. These protests and others in 2016 were often violent and took place within the broader context of frequent mass protests against authoritarian governments in Africa (e.g. in Burundi, Uganda, Ethiopia, Gabon, Republic of the Congo, Zimbabwe, and Cameroon).

In 2016 Kabila's government was mentioned in the Panama Papers and it asked and received permission from the country's constitutional court to allow Kabila to remain in power after his term ended if a successor had not been elected. Following protests in mid-2016 and calls by members of the opposition to hold talks Kabila's government announced the appointment of several nominally opposition politicians into cabinet posts but continued to claim that elections would be impossible to hold due to financial constraints and that the earliest possible date for elections would be April 2018. In September, the United States imposed financial sanctions on two of Kabila's advisors, Major General Gabriel Amisi Kumba and John Numbi, preventing the two from accessing assets within the US and engaging in financial transactions with US citizens. In December, the United States Department of the Treasury’s Office of Foreign Assets Control added Interior Minister Évariste Boshab and intelligence agency leader Kalev Mutondo to its sanctions list, while the European Union froze assets and banned travel of Ilunga Kampate, leader of the DRC's Republican Guard, as well as six more unnamed officials.

== Events ==
On 14 December 42 people were arrested in Goma according to Human Rights Watch. Meanwhile, an anti-Kabila protest was held outside the University of Kinshasa.

On 20 December security forces killed 19 civilians in Kinshasa, 6 civilians in Boma, 4 civilians in Matadi, and 5 civilians in Lubumbashi. Protesters held red penalty cards and blew whistles signifying the end of Kabila's term in office and their desire for him to leave power. Protesters in Kinshasa were attacked by security forces with tear gas, water cannons and live ammunition. According to the United Nations, at least 113 people had been arrested between the 17th and 19th.

On 21 December, protests in the country's second largest city, Lubumbashi, left 10 protesters dead and 47 wounded according to a local NGO. Other protests in cities across the country left a total of at least 26 dead for the day, according to the Human Rights Watch, which said that military and police personnel had been deployed in Lubumbashi and Kinshasa. The government reported only nine deaths, while saying that the police had arrested 275 people.

On 23 December an agreement was proposed between the main opposition group and the Kabila led-government under which the latter agreed not to alter the constitution and to leave office before the end of 2017. Under the agreement opposition leader Étienne Tshisekedi will oversee that the deal is implemented and the country's Prime Minister will be appointed by the opposition.

== Mediation efforts by DR Congo's Roman Catholic Church ==
DR Congo's Roman Catholic Church has been mediating talks between members of the country's political opposition and the government.

== International reactions ==
- Belgium: The Belgian government said it would review its relationship with the DRC.
- France: The French government called on the European Union to review its relationship with the DRC. The foreign minister, Jean-Marc Ayrault, said, "We can’t continue to pretend as if nothing is happening".
- Germany: The German foreign office stated on 21 December that "The negotiations on development cooperation scheduled to take place next year will be postponed indefinitely. The German Government reserves the right to take further steps."
- United Kingdom: Tobias Ellwood, the British Minister for Africa and the Middle East, said, "The government must urgently set a date for timely elections to prevent the situation from escalating further."
- United States: The American government released a statement saying, "We remain ready to impose additional sanctions on those – whether government or opposition – who perpetrate violence or impede DRC’s democratic institutions".

== Aftermath ==
By late January Congo's Catholic Bishops Conference (CENCO) announced that the December 31st deal was at risk of collapsing as Kabila's regime and the opposition disagreed over appointments to the electoral monitoring council and ministerial posts.

== See also ==
- 2015 Congolese protests
- 2011-2012 Senegalese protests
- 2020 Congolese protests
- 2019-2020 Gambian protests
