= University Avenue (Kinshasa) =

Street in Kinshasa, Democratic Republic of the Congo

- French: Avenue de l'Université
- Interactive map of University Avenue
- Maintained by: City of Kinshasa government

University Avenue (French: Avenue de l'Université) is a north–south road in Kinshasa, Democratic Republic of the Congo. Serving as one of the city's main traffic arteries, it spans the urban area from its northern terminus at the intersection of Sendwe Avenue and Lumumba Boulevard—marking the boundary between the communes of Kalamu and Limete—to its southern end at the University of Kinshasa campus in the commune of Lemba. Along its route, the avenue intersects major roads such as Victoire Avenue, Bongolo Avenue, Yolo Avenue, and Kapela Avenue, while passing key landmarks including the Ezo Roundabout and the Ngaba Roundabout, where it separates the communes of Makala and Ngaba.

== Rehabilitation ==
University Avenue has undergone numerous infrastructural overhauls to address its chronic state of disrepair. In May 2013, the Roads and Drainage Office (Office des Voiries et Drainage, OVD) executed partial resurfacing between Kapela and the Ngaba Roundabout using compacted stone to mitigate pervasive pothole damage. However, the absence of asphalt caused significant dust pollution, posing health risks to nearby residents. This marked the fourth rehabilitation within two years, with the rapid deterioration of the road primarily attributed to blocked drainage systems resulting from improper waste disposal.

By May 2017, the avenue had once again deteriorated significantly, with rainfall-induced erosion amplifying existing vulnerabilities. Impaired drainage systems led to extensive traffic bottlenecks and rendered segments of the road impassable, compelling pedestrians to traverse on foot. In March 2023, renewed reconstruction initiatives commenced at the Kapela intersection under the second phase of the "Kinshasa Zero Hole Operation" (Opération Kinshasa Zéro Trou). This project, spearheaded by OVD with oversight from the Technical Control Office (Bureau Technique de Contrôle, BTC) and funded by the National Road Maintenance Fund (Fonds National d’Entretien Routier, FONER), introduced reinforced concrete surfacing and advanced drainage enhancements. Specifically, the intervention addressed blocked gutters along Kimwenza Avenue, which had previously caused water stagnation and extensive road damage. The upgrades incorporated sanitation improvements and redirected drainage systems to the Mombele River, mitigating runoff-induced degradation and alleviating vehicular congestion. Temporary traffic rerouting was employed to expedite construction efforts.

By February 2024, the rehabilitation of University Avenue emerged as a cornerstone initiative under the Urban Transport Master Plan (Plan Directeur des Transports Urbains de Kinshasa, PDTK), facilitated by the Japan International Cooperation Agency (JICA). This pilot project envisioned the development of a 5.9-kilometer, four-lane carriageway equipped with advanced management technologies, including intelligent signaling systems, queue detectors, pedestrian footbridges, and augmented drainage solutions. Preliminary design studies explored four construction models, with local authorities endorsing a hybridized option estimated at $34 million. Efforts are underway to recalibrate the budget to a $20 million framework, exclusive of costs associated with expropriation and relocation of public services.
