= 19 January 2015 DRC protests =

2015 Congolese protests
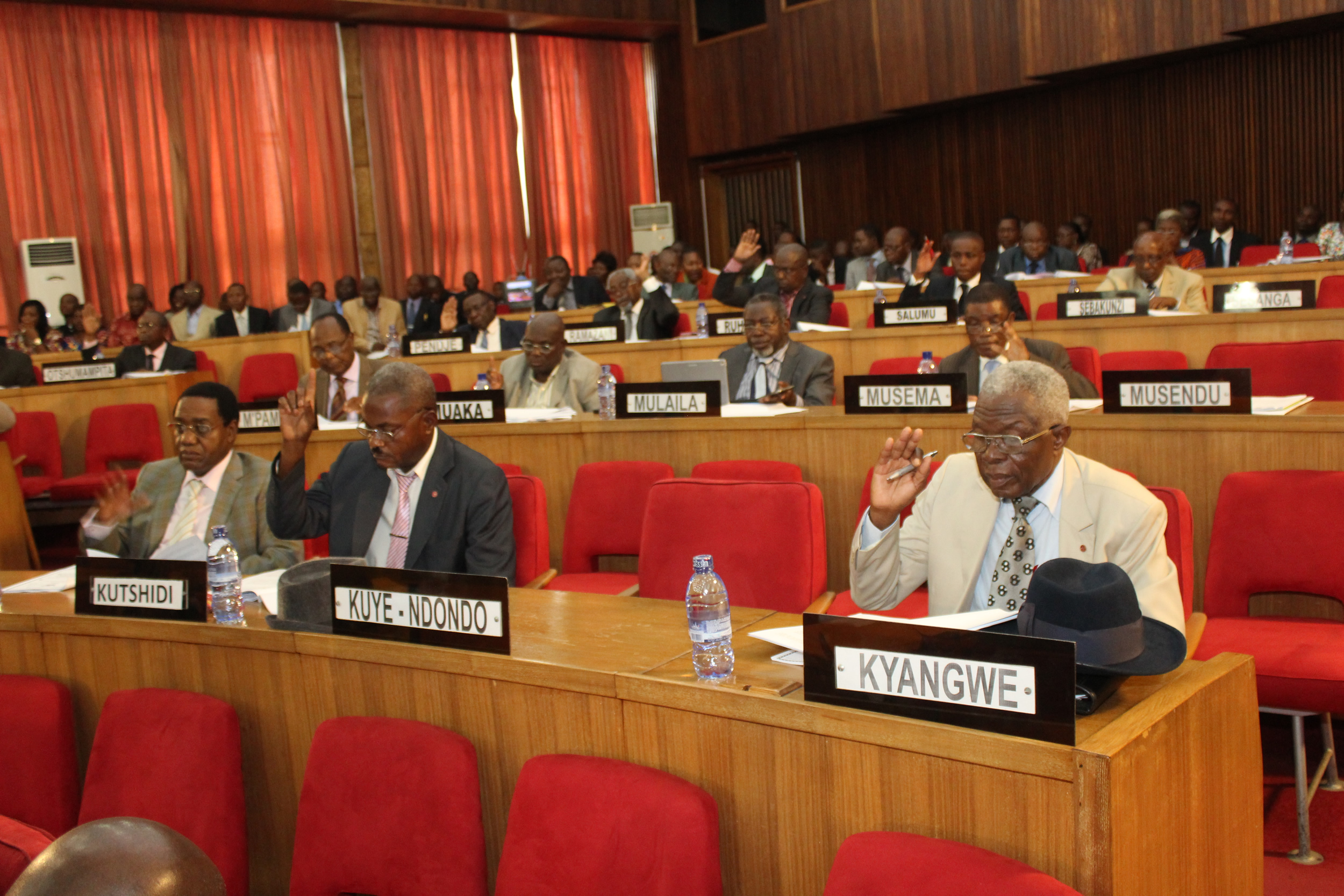
- Senate of the Democratic Republic of the Congo in session on 22 January 2015.
- Date: 19–25 January 2015
- Location: Kinshasa, Bukavu, Goma, Lubumbashi
- Caused by: legislation proposed that would allow the country's president, Joseph Kabila, to remain in power indefinitely until a national census was completed
- Goals: Political reforms, mainly discontinuation of the president's term
- Methods: Protests; Demonstrations
- Result: Congolese Senate passed a law omitting controversial census clause, opposition called off further protests

Parties
Student protesters; General public protesters	Government of The DR Congo; (Democratic Republic of the Congo) Congolese National Police

Lead figures
	Joseph Kabila

Casualties
- Deaths: 27 (government claim) – 42 deaths (Reuters claim) 36 confirmed by Human Rights Watch

On 19 January 2015, protests led by students at the University of Kinshasa broke out in the Democratic Republic of the Congo. The protests began following the announcement of a proposed law that would allow the country's 43-year-old president, Joseph Kabila, to remain in power until a national census could be conducted. Elections had been planned for 2016 and a census would be a massive undertaking that would likely take several years for the developing country.

By 21 January, clashes between police and protesters had claimed at least 42 lives (although the government claimed only 15 people had been killed, most by security guards while looting; the government later adjusted that figure to 27 killed). As a result of the protests the government closed certain radio stations, and cut all internet, SMS and 3G communication in the country on 20 January.

Following a series of meetings between foreign diplomats and Congolese government officials, the Congolese Senate passed the law, omitting the controversial census clause, and the opposition called off further protests.

== Events ==
On 17 January 2015, the Congolese National Assembly (the country's lower house) voted to revise the electoral law in the country's constitution. The new law would require that a national census be conducted prior to any upcoming elections, which, according to the Guardian newspaper, "could delay the general election, due to take place [in] 2016." On 19 January, following a call from opposition parties, protesters gathered in front of the Palais du Peuple and were subsequently attacked with tear gas and live ammunition by government security forces. Protests also took place in the capitals of the country's historically unstable eastern provinces of North and South Kivu.

On 20 January, Internet, SMS and 3G communications in the country were cut-off. On 21 January, the Congolese Catholic Church's Archbishop, Cardinal Laurent Monsengwo stated "We denounce these actions which have caused death and we are launching this plea: stop killing your people,...[and call on the people to use] all legal and peaceful [means to oppose the law change]." The Roman Catholic Church counts around half of the country's population amongst its congregants. The same day, American, British, French and Belgian diplomats met with the Congolese Senate President, Léon Kengo, and urged him either to suspend debate and voting on the modifying law or to remove the controversial provisions.

On 24 January, diplomats from Belgium, the European Union, France, the United Kingdom, the United Nations peacekeeping mission in Congo, and the United States met privately with President Kabila at his home in Kinshasa.

On 25 January, the Congolese Senate removed the controversial provision from the proposed law and passed it, leading the opposition to call off plans for protests on the next day. President Kabila has until 24 February to sign the bill into law.

== Attacks on Chinese businesses ==
Around 50 Chinese national-run businesses in the Kinshasa neighborhoods of Ngaba and Kalamu were targeted by looters. An Agence France-Presse article reported that the attacks were motivated by local businesses' resentment of the low prices of Chinese run stores and the rioters' association of Chinese-run stores with the government's Chinese investment deals which have become a centerpiece of the country's economic policy.

== Reactions ==
On 19 January, Martin Kobler, the head of MONUSCO, criticized the deaths and injuries during protests as "a result of violent demonstrations and the ensuing use of lethal force by the security force." He further said, "The use of force by law enforcement officers must always be necessary, proportionate, and a measure of last resort." On 20 January, the American government expressed concern about the situation in the country, the loss of life and the ongoing violence. The U.S. called for "timely elections [...] in accordance with the Constitution."

== Subsequent arrest of activists ==
On March 15 at least 26 activists, journalists, diplomats and civilians were arrested in Kinshasa while attending a workshop on freedom of expression. Those arrested included journalists from the BBC, AFP, RTBF, and the Senegalese youth-group Y'en a Marre. They were beaten by Congolese security forces, arrested and taken to be interrogated by members of Congo's National Intelligence Agency

On March 17 at least 10 people were arrested and beaten in Goma for protesting the earlier arrests in Kinshasa.

== See also ==
- December 2016 Congolese protests
- List of protests in the 21st century
