= Kalamu =

- Commune
- Commune de Kalamu
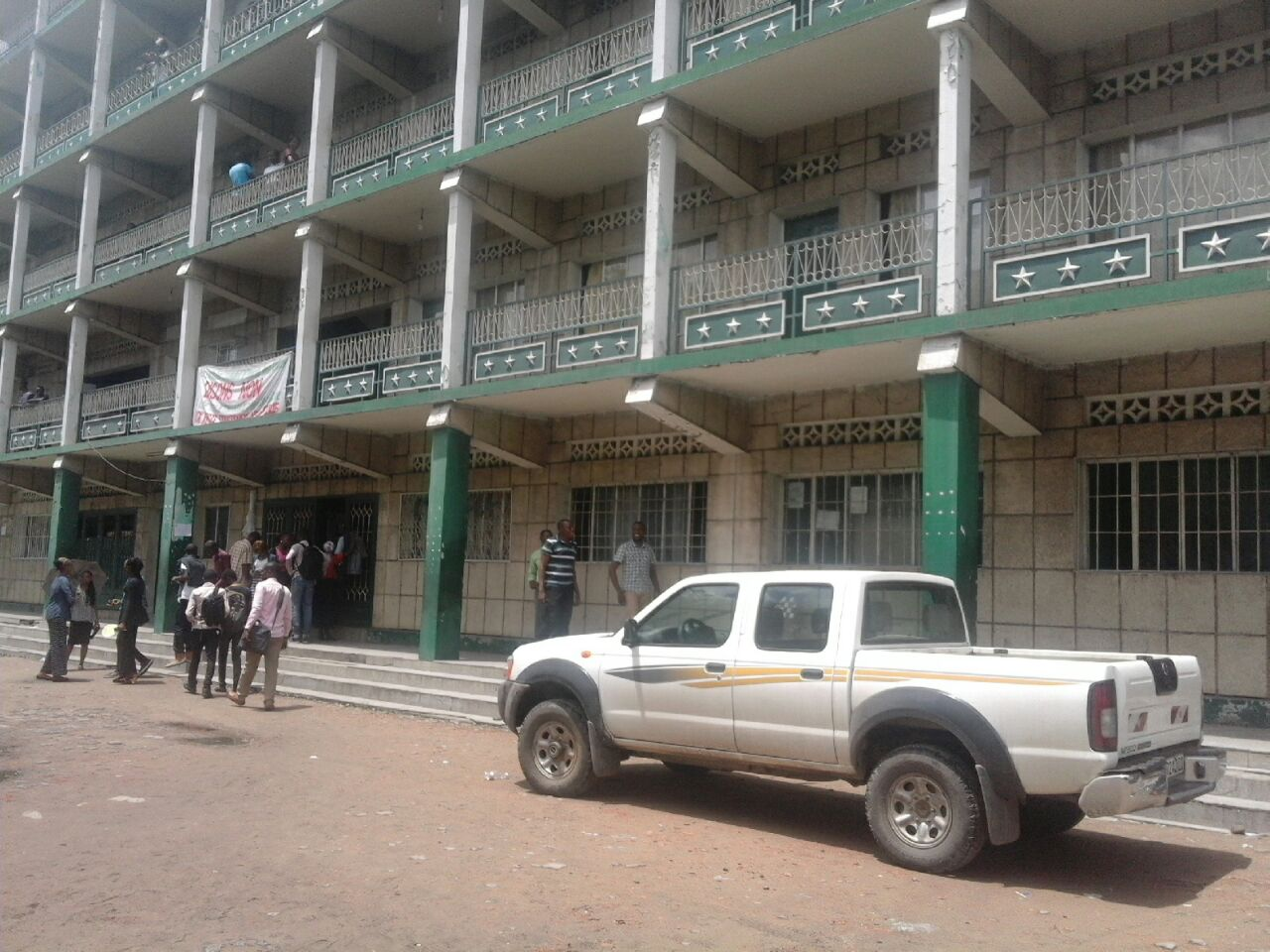
- Université Simon Kimbangu
- Kalamu on map of Kinshasa city-province
- Location in DR Congo
- Coordinates: 04°20′51″S 15°19′12″E
- Country: DR Congo
- City-Province: Kinshasa

Government
  - Burgomaster: Charly Luboya Makopo

Area
  - Total: 6.64 km^{2} (2.56 sq mi)

Population (2020 est.)
  - Total: 208,155
  - Density: 31,300/km^{2} (81,200/sq mi)

Kalamu is a commune in the Funa District of Kinshasa, located in the western region of the Democratic Republic of the Congo. Covering an area of 6.64 square kilometers, Kalamu lies in the central part of the city-province of Kinshasa. It is bordered by the Kinshasa commune to the north, Makala to the south, and Limete to the east, with Avenue de l'Université marking the boundary. As of 2015, Kalamu had an estimated population of 974,669, while a 2020 estimate noted a decrease to 208,155.

The commune is known for its significant cultural and social landmarks, including the popular Matonge neighborhood and the Victoire roundabout, which serve as the commune's bustling business center. Kalamu is also home to Stade Tata Raphaël, the country's largest stadium and Africa's fourth-largest stadium, as well as a statue commemorating Congolese musician Franco Luambo.

== History ==
The origins of Kalamu commune trace back to a 1950 urban plan by architect and urbanist Noël Van Malleghem, who was commissioned by Belgian authorities in 1947 to assist in the urban development of the Belgian Congo. Following Van Malleghem's plan, Kalamu was established as an administrative division of Kinshasa by Order No. 21–42 on 12 October 1957. The initiative aimed to alleviate congestion in the city center by expanding urban space to the southeast and creating satellite and indigenous cities. In alignment with this vision, Kalamu was developed alongside other communes, including Kasa-Vubu, Bandalungwa, Lemba, Matete, Limete, and Ngiri-Ngiri, as part of a broader effort to decentralize and manage the city's growing population.

== Geography ==
=== Geological composition ===
Kalamu's geological composition is divided into two main layers: the surface formations and the basement substratum. The surface terrains, which formed after the Paleozoic era, consist primarily of:

- Soft sandstones from the Mesozoic era
- Polymorphic sandstones, dating back to the Mesozoic period
- Quaternary silts and clays

The subterranean layer beneath Kalamu consists of feldspathic sandstone and the Inkisi series, formations dating back to the Precambrian era. Certain areas of the basement layer are overlaid by polymorphic sandstone. The predominant soil structure in Kalamu consists of fine and medium sand.

=== Topography ===
Topographically, Kalamu sits partly within a valley, with a relatively flat relief and an altitude of approximately 280 meters. This flat terrain has significant implications for water retention and drainage. Due to its low gradient, rainwater infiltration often lags behind the pace of rainfall, resulting in water accumulation.

=== Vegetation and hydrology ===
Historically, Kalamu was a savannah, but urban development has replaced much of its native vegetation with planted trees, commonly found within residential properties.

The Funa River, often referred to locally as Kalamu (a term meaning "watercourse" in the Teke-Humbu dialect of the region's indigenous population), is the primary waterway in the commune. However, the river's capacity and surrounding drainage infrastructure are challenged by the region's frequent flooding issues, which impact both the Funa River and its surrounding areas.

=== Climate ===
The climate in Kalamu, like the rest of Kinshasa, is classified as AW4 under the Köppen climate classification. The rainy season spans from approximately 22 September to 27 May, with a brief dry period in February. The longer dry season extends from 28 May to 21 September, lasting 117 days, or nearly four months.

Kalamu experiences weak, southwesterly surface winds, with rainfall recorded over 100 days annually across Kinshasa. The average annual rainfall is 203.3 mm, with April and November standing out as the wettest months. During these periods, intense downpours often lead to natural disasters in the area. In contrast, a marked decrease in precipitation is observed from June to August, with monthly averages of 4 mm in June, 3 mm in July, and 15 mm in August. The dry season also brings the coolest temperatures, with July typically reaching lows around 17.7 °C. In contrast, March is the hottest month, with temperatures peaking at 32.6 °C. Throughout the year, temperatures vary from an average of 22.5 °C in July to 26.1 °C in March, resulting in an annual range of 3.6 °C. Relative humidity levels fluctuate between 71% and 82%.

=== Administrative division ===
Kalamu's governance framework is defined by Ordinance-Laws No. 82-006 and 82-008, issued on 25 February 1982, which delineate the political and administrative organization of the Democratic Republic of the Congo, organizing Kinshasa into communes, neighborhoods, and avenues. Kalamu is subdivided into 18 neighborhoods, further partitioned into avenues. These neighborhoods operate as administrative units without autonomous legal standing.

No.	Neighborhoods	Land area	Population (2020)
1.	Matonge I	441,331	10,570
2.	Matonge II	381,327	14,345
3.	Matonge III	401,909	7,284
4.	Immo Congo	576,103	4,702
5.	Kauka I	452,232	16,802
6.	Kauka II	147,893	5,862
7.	Kauka III	263,348	5,574
8.	Yolo Nord I	262,348	12,214
9.	Yolo Nord II	170,962	7,408
10.	Yolo Nord III	334,490	12,547
11.	Yolo Sud I	448,570	14,782
12.	Yolo Sud II	219,680	8,850
13.	Yolo Sud III	277,897	13,023
14.	Yolo Sud IV	210,318	13,455
15.	Pinzi	231,298	10,933
16.	Kimbangu I	466,478	14,718
17.	Kimbangu II	595,561	21,718
18.	Kimbangu III	251,127	13,368
	Kalamu	6,664,872	208,155

Source: Population Service of Kalamu (2020)

Historical population
Year	1967	1970	1984	2003	2004
Pop.	78,310	100,441	160,719	304,961	315,342
±%	—	+28.3%	+60.0%	+89.7%	+3.4%

Burgomaster succession list
Period		Name
1957	1960	Arthur Pinzi
1960	1965	Justin Disasi
1965	1968	Diasuka Dia Meso
1969	1977	Mamá Elonga Ebongo
1977	1982	Mandulu Mopalu
1982	1988	Bungana Mbowa
1988	1997	Aungane Bose
1997	1999	Ntoya Nuni Mfwanga
1999	2002	André Landu Kamavuako
2002	2005	Marcel Mwanga Miany
8 July 2005	2023	Jean-Claude Kalonji Kadima
6 January 2023	Incumbent	Charly Luboya Makopo

=== Residence ===
Housing in Kalamu reflects a mix of formal and informal structures. While some planned areas exhibit systematic cadastral organization and stratified layouts, rapid urban sprawl and insufficient housing availability have precipitated the rise of informal settlements, particularly in flood-prone and marshy terrains. Initially envisioned as green spaces, many of these areas have been occupied, creating densely packed living conditions. In the 1960s, the Office des Cités Africaines (OCA) erected residential units in Kalamu to accommodate small families. Over time, these accommodations have become overcrowded, often housing an average of seven people within confined spaces of 25 square meters. In response to increasing housing demands, extensive self-built developments have proliferated, predominantly along riverbanks. This self-directed construction has significantly intensified housing density, particularly among economically disadvantaged residents.

Unregulated building practices have given rise to a complex residential landscape, especially in Non ædificandi zones, which were traditionally designated as unfit or restricted for construction. Heightened rental speculation has led to the fragmentation of plots into smaller "half-plot" configurations, creating densely packed residential groupings within what were initially single-family plots. Certain buildings are constructed to house multiple families within one structure, a trend magnified by rural migration as people from neighboring villages relocate to Gombe seeking employment, healthcare, and other urban amenities.

== Economy and infrastructure ==
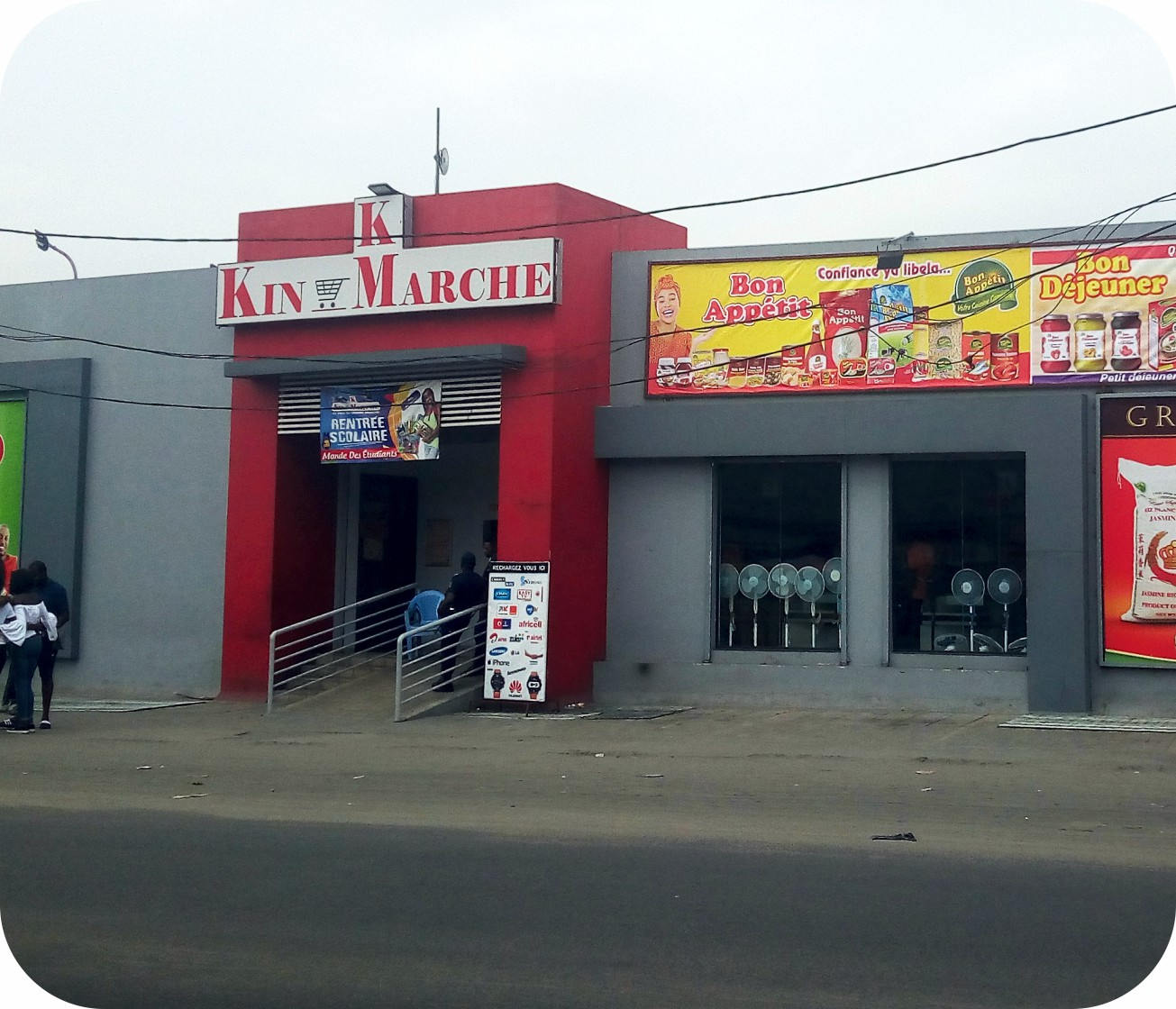
Kin Marché Victoire in Kalamu, Kinshasa

Kalamu's economy is predominantly driven by the tertiary sector, with a considerable portion of the local workforce engaged in informal employment. Many residents depend on crafts, small-scale trading, and transport services for their livelihoods.

The commune is equipped with socio-community infrastructure, including Stade Tata Raphaël, the Funa general prosecutor's office, police sub-stations, markets, hotels, schools, and institutes of higher education. However, these facilities are increasingly strained by the heightened population density and adverse environmental conditions. The urban framework includes a network of primary and secondary roads, supplemented by tertiary roads that connect various plots and neighborhoods. A significant portion of the secondary and tertiary road infrastructure is in a state of disrepair. Roads are frequently damaged or flooded due to heavy rainfall and the marshy topography, which complicates mobility. Deficient road maintenance exacerbates congestion, particularly in areas where roads become obstructed or partially submerged during rainfall.

Kalamu's sanitation infrastructure remains severely underdeveloped. The wastewater treatment is largely absent, leading to sanitation issues that are exacerbated by the high-density settlement pattern. These issues are further aggravated in neighborhoods where construction has encroached upon natural floodplains and former green spaces, obstructing natural water flow.

== Environmental problems ==
=== Flooding ===
Kalamu faces significant flooding, exacerbated by rapid demographic expansion and inadequate waste disposal systems. Seasonal flooding is a recurrent hazard, primarily affecting neighborhoods along the riverbanks. During the rainy season, the Funa River often overflows its banks, with water pooling in low-lying valleys and submerging residential areas.

Several factors contribute to these floods. The deforestation of nearby slopes reduces natural water absorption, while accelerated urbanization encroaches on the river's major and minor beds. This urban expansion, often unregulated, results in dense construction without regard for soil stability or flood risks. The accumulation of household waste in water channels obstructs flow, leading to further flooding. Frequent and intense rains saturate the soil, generating excessive runoff and standing water, both of which contribute to the overflow of the Funa River. Erosive activity upstream erodes soil, which then deposits in riverbeds, reducing channel capacity and elevating water levels by several meters.

The commune's wastewater systems are outdated and incapable of handling the growing waste load. Rainwater infiltration into the soil is limited due to erosion and poor land management, which increases surface runoff into the river. Fecal pollution from inadequate sanitation facilities further contaminates the Funa River, compounded by sewage and effluent discharges. Quantifying this pollution remains challenging due to limited statistical data, but it worsens as new spillways are constructed without comprehensive waste management planning.

=== Pollution ===
Kalamu faces critical pollution challenges primarily stemming from the management of plastic waste. The widespread use of plastic sachets for water and other items has led to pervasive littering, with an absence of municipal strategies to address the issue effectively. Rivers and waterways are often treated as disposal sites, resulting in blocked flows and forcing rivers to carve new paths, often at the expense of nearby homes and infrastructure. The lack of proper drainage exacerbates sanitation issues, with stagnant rainwater accumulating in the streets and around residential areas, leading to unhygienic conditions compounded by outdated or inadequate piping systems. Piles of garbage accumulate on street corners, and decomposing waste emits foul odors. Neighborhoods across Kalamu, including Kimbangu I, II, III, as well as older areas such as Matonge, Yolo, Kauka, Immo Congo, and Pinzi, suffer from a lack of organized urban planning and essential sanitation facilities. Over time, unregulated construction and population growth have displaced green spaces, drainage systems, and public amenities.

== International relations ==
=== Twin towns and sister cities ===
Kalamu is twinned with:

- Ixelles, Belgium
