= Matonge (Kinshasa) =

Neighborhood in the Democratic Republic of the Congo

Coordinates: 4°20′20″S 15°19′03″E

Matonge, or Matongé (pronounced [matɔŋɡe]), is a notable neighbourhood in the north of the commune of Kalamu within the city of Kinshasa in the Democratic Republic of the Congo.

Situated between the Victoire quarter and the Stade Tata Raphaël, Matonge is known for its nightlife, including bars. There are also several recording studios based in the quarter.

It is best known as a cultural and musical center of Congolese music, from where groups such as Papa Wemba's Viva La Musica launched the musical careers of numerous figures including Koffi Olomidé and King Kester Emeneya.

During the colonial period, the area was called Renkin.
