= Mbilia Bel =

Congolese singer (born 1959)

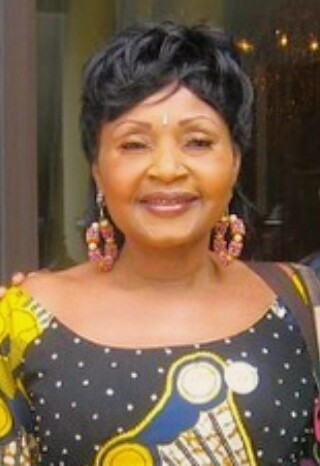
- Mbilia Bel in 2019

Background information
- Also known as: Queen of African Rumba; Queen Cleopatra
- Born: Marie Claire Mboyo Moseka; January 10, 1959 (age 67); Léopoldville, Belgian Congo (modern-day Kinshasa, Democratic Republic of the Congo)
- Genres: Congolese rumba; soukous; hip-hop; zouk
- Occupation: Singer-songwriter
- Instrument: Vocals
- Years active: 1974—present
- Labels: Editions Veve International; Genidia; Stern's Africa; Mbilia Production; Kilimanjaro Int'l Productions; Terrascape; Celluloid; KS Production; A Music Production; SonoDisc; IMA Records; Syllart Productions; Claudi Nyere; Eagle Center; Nsana Production
- Formerly of: Les Redoutables, Afrisa International

Marie-Claire Mboyo Moseka (born 10 January 1959), known professionally as Mbilia Bel, is a Congolese singer and songwriter. Dubbed the "Queen of African Rumba" and "Queen Cleopatra", she is regarded as one of the most influential figures in 20th-century Congolese and African popular music. Her music blends Congolese rumba, soukous, rap, and zouk, with lyrics that often explore love, politics, hedonism, militancy, jealousy, sentimentality, and education.

Mboyo began her recording career at the age of 15 as a member of Abeti Masikini's band Les Redoutables and later worked with Sam Mangwana. She gained significant recognition after joining Tabu Ley Rochereau's Afrisa International in 1981, debuting her lead vocals with the Tabu Ley-written 1982 hit "Mpeve Ya Longo". Mboyo's jointly composed hit "Eswi Yo Wapi" with Tabu Ley won the Best Song award, while she was named Best New Artist.

Following several recordings and tours with Afrisa International, she debuted her 1988 solo studio album, Phénomène. In 1991, she released her second studio album, Désolé!!!, followed by 8/10 Benedicta (1993). Her fourth studio album, Yalowa, released in 1996, earned her the Best Female Singer from ACMCO (Association des Chroniqueurs de Musique du Congo). In 2001, Mboyo released her fifth studio album, Welcome, and was honored as the Best Female Singer of 2002 by ACMCO. Mboyo won the Best Central Africa Female at the Kora Awards in December 2003. In 2004, she released her sixth studio album, Belissimo, followed by The Queen (2011), Royaume d'amour (2014), Signature 8646 (2017), and Big Mama (2021).

== Early years ==
Mbilia Bel was born Marie-Claire Mboyo Moseka on 10 January 1959, in Léopoldville, Belgian Congo (now Kinshasa, Democratic Republic of the Congo), to Mbala Mbondi and Mboyo Mbilia. Her father, Mbala Mbondi, known as "Louis XIV", was a charanga dancer in Bumba, Mongala Province. She completed six years of primary school and pursued studies in Humanities, which she did not finish. Mboyo developed a passion for music after seeing Togolese singer Bella Bellow during her 1969 tour of Congo. She initially began singing as a backup vocalist at the Catholic parish in the 12th quartier of the N'Djili commune.

== Career ==
=== 1979–1987: Les Redoutables, Sam Mangwana and Afrisa International ===
In 1974, at the age of 15, Mboyo responded to a radio advertisement soliciting backing singers for Abeti Masikini's group, Les Redoutables. Following a successful audition, she was inducted into the group. A few months later, Mboyo departed from Les Redoutables and chose to undertake a year-long sabbatical. She subsequently rejoined Les Redoutables in 1979 at Abeti's behest but once more exited in 1980 to pursue academic aspirations, enrolling in an institution in Gombe for executive secretarial training. In mid-1981, Mboyo was offered the chance by Sam Mangwana to accompany the Bo-Bongo orchestra for some concerts. During this period, Sam Mangwana introduced Mboyo on the Zaire N°1 show by Benoit Lukunku Sampu, which catapulted her into prominence at the Mama Angebi studio of the Office Zaïrois de Radio Télévision (OZRT).

Following disillusionment during a tour in Shaba, Mboyo parted ways with Sam. Michel Sax, a saxophonist with Tabu Ley Rochereau's orchestra Afrisa International, recommended Mboyo to Tabu Ley as a substitute for the Yondo Sisters, two singing and dancing siblings who had vacated Afrisa International. Impressed by her audition, Tabu Ley promptly renamed her "Mbilia Bel".

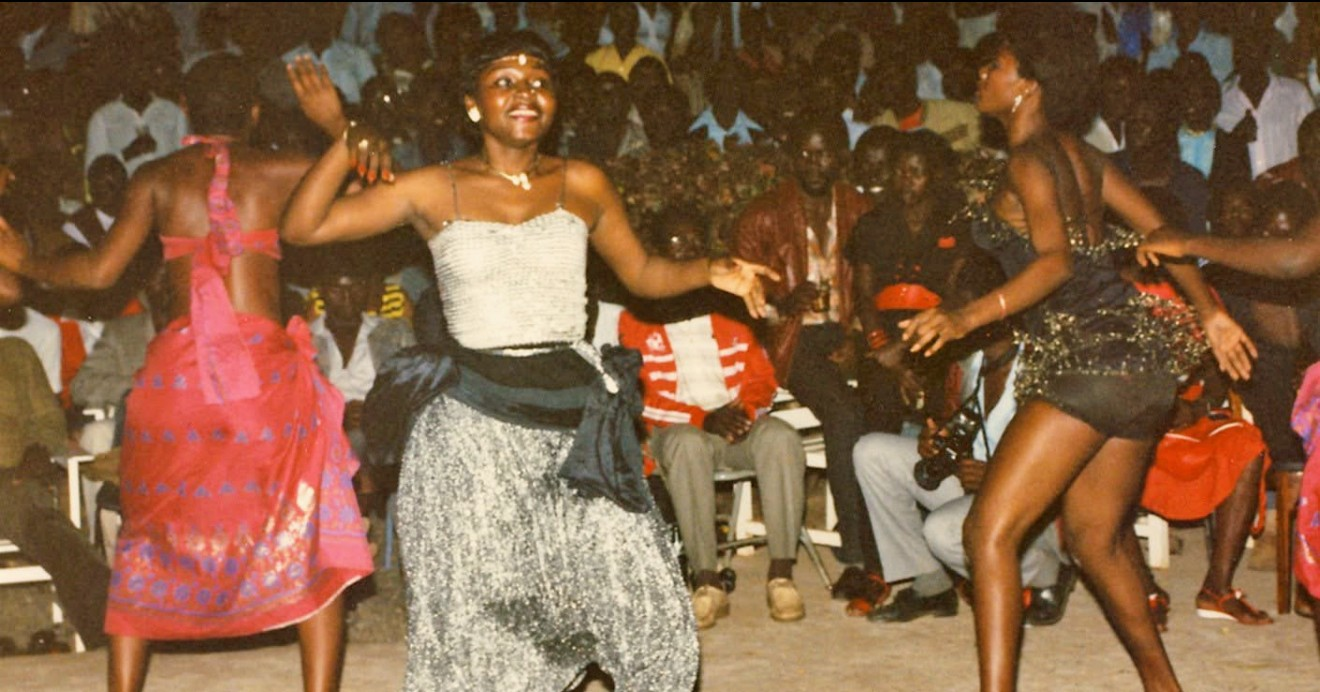
Mbilia Bel (center) performing in Kinshasa, Zaire, in 1986.

Mbilia Bel made her debut lead vocals with Afrisa International on "Mpeve Ya Longo", a hit composed by Tabu Ley and released in early 1982 on the album Belley (Mpeve Ya Longo) through Genidia, Tabu Ley's record label. The song addressed domestic violence, telling the story of a woman whose husband abandoned her and left her to raise their children by herself. "Mpeve Ya Longo" struck a chord with women and received widespread recognition nationwide.

She also performed lead vocals on several other songs written by Tabu Ley, including "Sima Na Ngai", "Lisanga Bambanda", and "Kelhia", as well as Pompou Kuleta's "Kashama", Shaba Kahamba's "Lou Moussou", and Dino Vangu's "Quelle Mechanceté". Together with Tabu Ley, she co-wrote "Eswi Yo Wapi", which earned her the award for Best Song, while she was also named Best New Artist. By 1983, she had earned the sobriquet "Cleopatra of Zairean music", and Afrisa International's popularity was beginning to rival that of Franco Luambo's TPOK Jazz. She wrote "Nazali Mwasi" for Afrisa's Faux Pas album and performed lead vocals on the album's eponymous hit, written by Tabu Ley, as well as "Bafosami" by Matuti Djo Roy and "Motema Ekopona" by Kuleta. This was followed by the eight-track album Loyenghe, on which Mbilia Bel co-wrote "Bameli Soy" with Tabu Ley. In 1984, she wrote "Otumoli Mobutu Otumoli Ba Mama" for the four-track, politically oriented album Mobutu Peuple Ba Vote Yo Massivement and provided lead vocals on Tabu Ley's "Mobutu To Vote Yo Massivement" and "Candidat Ya MPR: Mobutu", as well as Joseph Lutumba and Simon-Pierre Boka Di Mpasi Londi's "La Zaïroise". These songs supported Mobutu Sese Seko's regime and its political propaganda promoting the one-party state's ideology of Authenticité, which emphasized traditional elements to bolster the regime's public image.

That same year, Mbilia Bel wrote "Ba Jeu De Coin" and co-wrote the eponymous title track with Tabu Ley for the four-track Ba Gerants Ya Mabala, while also collaborating with Panga Kasongo and Tabu Ley on the Swahili-language hit "Paka Wewe". Mbilia Bel and Tabu Ley's collaborative album Keyna boosted their popularity in East Africa, particularly through the Tabu Ley-written smash hit "Nakei Nairobi" (Lingala for "I am going to Nairobi"), which tells the story of a childhood friend named Duni who had moved to Nairobi. After hearing about the difficulties he was experiencing in a foreign country, Mbilia Bel decided to travel to Nairobi and bring him back to Kinshasa. Some accounts have speculated that Duni was actually a reference to Tabu Ley himself. The song's mention of the Kenyan slogan "Harambee Nyayo" was interpreted by many Kenyan media outlets as a reference to President Daniel arap Moi. Africa Is a Country has noted that Moi, who had previously prohibited Zairean music in Kenya, reportedly changed his position after "Nakei Nairobi" was released. Afrisa also toured London in 1984.

In 1985, Mbilia Bel performed with the band on two albums: Boya Ye, released in the UK by Sterns, and La Beauté D'Une Femme. She also performed on the standalone single "Shauri Yako" with Tabu Ley and Afrisa International and made her debut at the World of Music, Arts and Dance festival at Mersea Island in Essex. Later that year, on 7 September, they performed at the now-closed Upper Cut Club in Stratford, London. Music journalist Alastair Johnston recalled that "the sound system blared African pop as the place slowly filled up with London's expatriate African community dressed for a night out". Around this time, she married Tabu Ley and they had a daughter named Melody Tabu. In 1986, Tabu Ley enlisted another female singer, Thérèse Kishila Ngoyi (popularly known as Faya Tess). That year Afrisa International embarked on a tour of East Africa, where they performed in Kenya, Tanzania, and Rwanda, and the tour culminated in the album Nadina. The tour was successful, with Mbilia Bel emerging as the band's focal performer and eclipsing other members, including Ndombe Opetum, who had recently returned from OK Jazz. Following their return to Kinshasa, rumors began circulating about a rift between Tabu Ley and Mbilia Bel. Both denied any discord when speaking to the press, and she rejoined Tabu Ley in 1987 for the Genidia-produced album Beyanga.

== Solo career ==
=== 1988–1995: Departure from Afrisa International and releases ===
The recruitment of Faya Tess continued to fuel internal discord within Afrisa International, impacting the orchestra's consistency on their forthcoming record Contre ma volonté. Mbilia Bel departed from Afrisa International to pursue a solo career, citing the lack of transparency in management and the conflation of professional and personal relationships. She briefly collaborated with a Gabonese producer in Libreville before relocating to Paris, where she joined forces with guitarist Rigo Star Bamundele.

In 1988, Mbilia Bel debuted with her solo studio album Phénomène, which includes six songs. It was produced by her record label, Mbilia Production, and distributed through Mélodie Distribution. Phénomene was recorded at Studio Davout. Rigo Star Bamundele arranged, provided backing vocals, and mixed the album at Studio Plus XXX. The album achieved immense success in Kinshasa and Brazzaville, as well as internationally. The album's eponymous single and "Tika Bazuwa" teased her stormy relationship with Tabu Ley.

In 1989, she teamed up with Rigo Star and Madilu System for a trio album project called Exploration, which blended Congolese rumba, soukous, and rap. Produced by Kilimanjaro Int'l Productions and distributed internationally, the album was reissued in CD format in 1997 by Terrascape in Belgium.

Mbilia Bel released her second studio album, Désolé!!!, in 1991. It was co-produced by Celluloid, a French record label, and KS Production and consisted of eight tracks. Désolé!!! was composed, arranged, and programmed by Rigo Star, who included drums, percussion, and synthesizers. He played all guitar and bass parts and contributed to the backing vocals. Mbilia Bel then worked with him on a joint album titled Ironie, which came out in 1993. The nine-track album was produced by Celluloid, with Rigo Star handling the production and musical arrangement. That same year, Mbilia Bel released the ten-track album 8/10 Benedicta, produced by A Music Production in Belgium and later reissued in 1994 by SonoDisc in France.

=== 1996–2005: from Yalowa to Belissimo ===
Mbilia Bel's fourth studio album, Yalowa, came out in 1996 in the United States under IMA Records. The record, which contains ten tracks, was written and arranged by Rigo Star and included a guest appearance by Vivick Matoua. Yalowa received praise for its production quality and musical support, with JazzTimes magazine lauding its "beautiful melodies". In a review for RootsWorld, Opiyo Oloya characterized the album as a "sacrilegious cross-breeding of African and western pop rhythms", noting subtle soukous influences that did not dominate the music. After nearly six years in Paris expanding her European audience, Mbilia Bel returned to Zaire in 1996 to re-establish herself in the Zairean music scene. She guest-performed on Simaro Lutumba's 1997 album Trahison, which commemorates thirty-six years of Lutumba's musical and artistic career. Mbilia Bel performs the song "Mama Kulutu" in a duet with Pépé Kallé on the album. The song addresses polygamy, mainly focusing on the grievances of the second wife, who is constantly berated by the first wife. That same year, she was awarded the Best Female Singer by the ACMCO (Association des Chroniqueurs de Musique du Congo).

Mbilia Bel reconstituted her orchestra and dance group with Kembo Idrissa, who accompanied her in her VIP productions and rehearsed with Zaïko Langa Langa at Kimpwanza bar in the Kasa-Vubu commune. With her group, she embarked on a major tour in East Africa and Gabon, then Scandinavia. In 1998, she also participated in the production of Souzy Kasseya's song "Tokufa Pona Congo" alongside Wenge Musica Maison Mère, Jimmy Mbonda, Jolino Kiezowa, Général Defao, Tshala Muana, Paul Ndombe, Jossart N'Yoka Longo, Antoine Wendo Kolosoy, Lassa Lacolyte, Adamo Ekula, Pépé Kallé, and King Kester Emeneya. She also appeared on Général Defao's album Copinage.

In October 2001, Mbilia Bel announced to Le Phare that her upcoming album Welcome was in the conclusive phases of production and slated for debut on 15 November. Comprising ten tracks, the album was produced by Syllart Productions, a France-based label specializing in African and Afro-Latin music established by Senegalese producer Ibrahima Sylla. Executive producer Waly Timera oversaw its distribution by Next Music and Sono. Welcome was recorded at Studio Recorder, with Hervé Marignac managing the mixing, and the arrangements managed by Manu Lima and Souzy Kasseya. However, the National Commission for the Censorship of Songs and Performances (CNCCS) interdicted its three singles from television due to alleged obscenities in the tracks. Without any changes to the visuals, the same music videos eventually reappeared on television channels for public airing. Despite the ban, she promoted the album with a sold-out show at Pullman Kinshasa Grand Hotel on 9 November 2002, where she performed alongside Tshala Muana. She subsequently took part in the Empire Fondation orchestra's concert at Pullman Kinshasa Grand Hotel on 30 November and appeared at Empire Foundation's debut concert at the LSC in Paris on 27 March 2003. In July 2003, she won ACMCO's Best Female Singer of 2002 in their annual referendum, and in December, Welcome's breakout single "Douceur" earned her the Best Central Africa Female accolade at the Kora Awards in Sun City.

From 27 September to 9 October 2004, Mbilia Bel performed at Pullman Kinshasa Grand Hotel for the commemorative events marking the tenth anniversary of Abeti Masikini's death. The event was coordinated by the Abeti Masikini Foundation in conjunction with Akueson Worldwide of France and Shabani Records of the DRC. Later that year, she released her ten-track album Belissimo, which was produced by Syllart Productions and distributed by Stern's Africa in the UK. Belissimo was arranged by Souzy Kasseya and includes backing vocals from Awa Maïga, Melodie Tabu, Monique Ouadjah Koko, Prince Lessa Lassan, and Shakembo. To promote Belissimo, Mbilia Bel hosted a show in Kenya in May 2005 and then presented a VIP performance at Sheraton Kampala Hotel on 2 September, with another concert at Mayfair Hotel in Jinja, on 3 September. She further promoted the album with a tour spanning Dubai, Ethiopia, Zambia, Namibia, and Tanzania. On 13 October, Mbilia Bel was nominated for Best Female Artist at the Kora Awards.

=== 2006–2014: from "Kokoka" to The Queen ===
In 2006, Mbilia Bel collaborated with Kenyan singer Suzanna Owíyo on the single "Kokoka", which earned them a nomination for Best Collaboration at the 7th edition of Kisima Music Awards. In October 2007, Mbilia Bel embarked on a tour of Kenya, headlining two concerts, one of which was the Luo Sigalagala event organized by the GoDown Arts Centre. On 29 March 2008, she appeared at Simaro Lutumba's Vivement Simaro, merci l'artiste concert at the Pullman Kinshasa Grand Hotel to celebrate his 70th birthday, and later performed at Tshala Muana's concert at the same venue to mark her 30-year music career. In June 2009, she collaborated with Simaro Lutumaba to interpret his song "Mobali Ya Bato", which quickly peaked atop the Congolese charts.

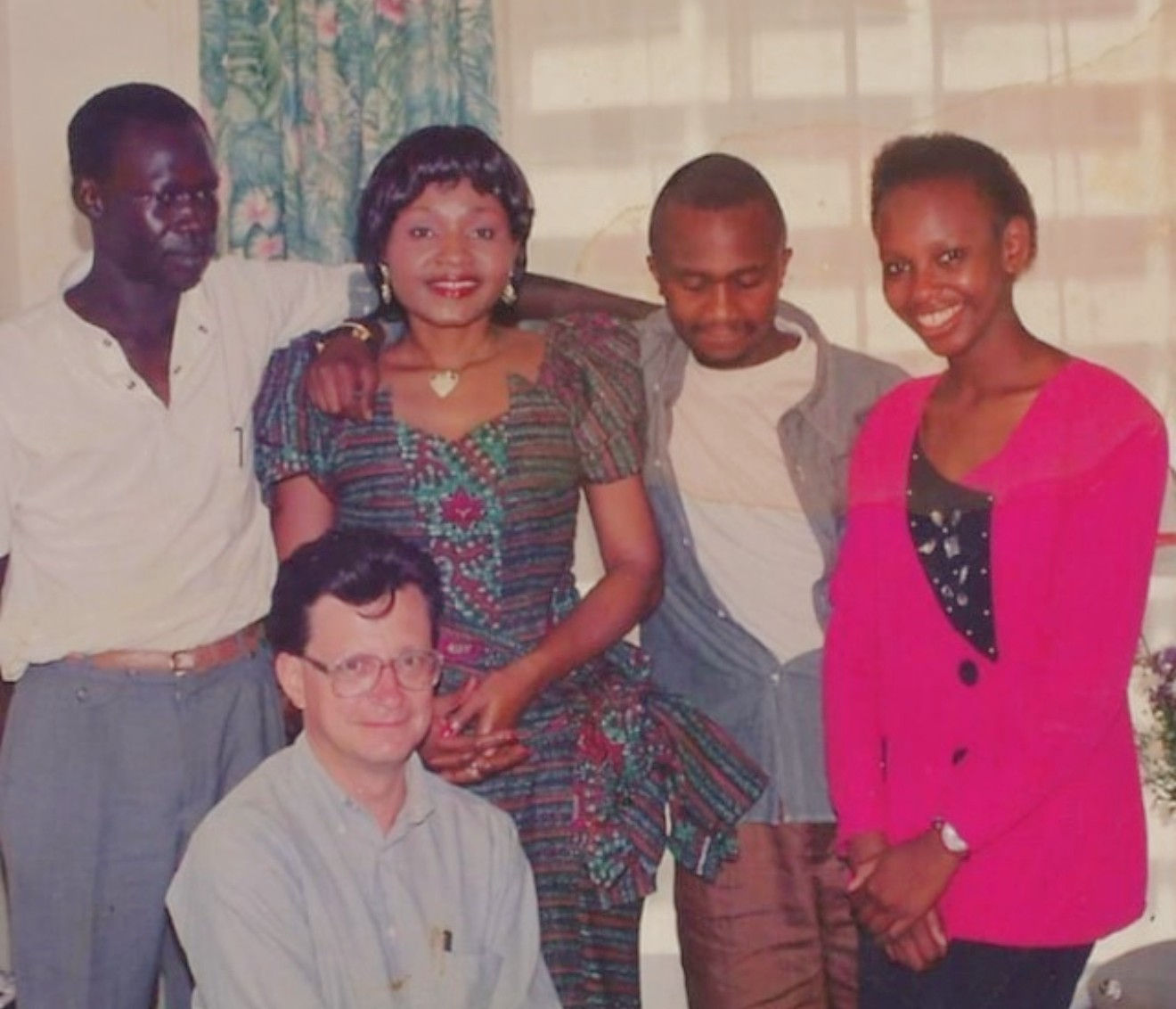
Mbilia Bel during a 1994 interview with Kenyan radio host Carol Radull in Nairobi

In September 2009, Mbilia Bel was part of the opening song for the 29th SADC summit, which was recorded in Kinshasa with other Congolese artists and subsequently played at the summit's opening ceremony. On 17 October, she performed at the Pullman Kinshasa Grand Hotel in tribute to Franco Luambo, with former OK Jazz members and contemporary rumba artists, including Koffi Olomide, Malage de Lugendo, Papa Noël Nedule, Wuta Mayi, Edo Nganga, Michel Boyibanda, Jossart N'Yoka Longo, Bozi Boziana, Manda Chante, Papa Wemba, Tshala Muana, Simaro Lutumba, and Bana Ok. On 28 May the next year, she participated in the Élection de Miss Tshangu, which was part of the 6th edition of the Festival Socioculturel de la Tshangu (Festsha) held at Hotel Apocalypse 22 in the Masina commune. Following her Canadian tour, she graced the closing of the 3rd edition of the Afro-Colombian Champeta Festival at Plaza de la Aduana in Cartagena, Colombia, in August 2010. During this performance, she was accompanied by guitarist Lokassa Ya Mbongo, and the event was attended by the city's mayor, Judith Pinedo Flórez.

In early December 2010, Mbilia Bel announced that her upcoming thirteen-track album, The Queen, was nearing completion. Initially scheduled for release on 12 December in Paris and 15 December in Kinshasa and Brazzaville, The Queen was ultimately launched in early 2011. The record, produced by Syllart Productions, featured Manu Lima on bass and keyboards, as well as Dally Kimoko and Fofo Le Collegien on lead guitar, with backing vocals provided by Ballou Canta, Denis Tshibayi, Khady Mbaye, Mariam Coulibaly, Nyboma Mwan'dido, Pamela Badiogo, and Serge Mabiala. Guinean singer Sékouba Bambino also made a guest appearance on lead vocals alongside Nyboma. The Queen was a blend of Congolese rumba and zouk. The album's breakout single "Immigration Fatale" (featuring Nyboma and Sékouba Bambino) garnered significant success due to its message about the plight of African children who risk their lives crossing the Mediterranean Sea in pursuit of a better future in Europe. She supported the album with a sold-out performance at Nuit de la Francophonie hosted at Stade des Martyrs on 10 October 2012 as part of the events planned for the 14th summit of the Organisation internationale de la Francophonie.

In July 2013, Mbilia Bel and Tshala Muana were special guests at Yvonne Chaka Chaka's performance at Stade Félix Éboué in Brazzaville during the ninth edition of Pan-African Music Festival (Fespam). She then went on to perform in Golungo Alto, Cuanza Norte Province of Angola, and followed it up with a show at Pullman Kinshasa Grand Hotel to celebrate Tshala Muana's 35-year music career. On 21 September 2014, Mbilia Bel teamed up with Didier Awadi, Hanisha Solomon, Naledi Ya Tshwane, Ray-Son, Simply Chrysolite, and Femi Kuti for a pro bono performance at Warner Theatre in Washington for PAD's Stop Africa Land Grab Concert, aimed at raising awareness about the massive land acquisitions in Africa by foreign investors, which often lead to food shortages and conditions that allow the Ebola virus to thrive.

=== 2014–2021: from Royaume d'amour to Signature 8646 ===
In December 2014, Mbilia Bel released a maxi-single titled Royaume d'amour, with recording done in Brazzaville and Libreville and production by Claudi Nyere. On 8 March the following year, she performed in Pointe-Noire for International Women's Day and subsequently made a guest appearance on SOS Salsa's album Wo Wo Wo. In July 2015, she played at Stade Félix Éboué, in Brazzaville, during the 10th edition of the Republic of Congo's Pan-African Music Festival (FESPAM). The following year, in July, Mbilia Bel performed at a concert by Krist Duford Productions at the La Détente bar in Bacongo neighborhood of Brazzaville to honor mothers.

Mbilia Bel commenced work on her 18-track double album Signature 8646 in mid-2016. In an interview with Les Dépêches de Brazzaville, she stated that Signature 8646 would be her final album. Initially set for release on 25 January 2017, ten days after her birthday celebration, the album was officially launched on 10 May and was produced by Eagle Center in Moungali, with Claudrick Miéré as the producer. Signature 8646 is a fusion of Congolese rumba and soukous. It explored themes of love, jealousy, sentimentality, and education. To promote Signature 8646, she set off on her "Kenya Peace Tour", with shows in Nairobi and Kisumu. The first concert marked the 57th anniversary of Congolese Independence Day at the New Meladen Club in Upper Hill, where she urged her fans to champion peace and brotherhood. She then performed at Kisumu's Victoria Railway Club, alongside Kenyan artists Lady Maureen and Madanji Perimeter. On 16 December, Mbilia Bel and Tshala Muana took the stage as guests for Barbara Kanam's concert at Kinshasa's SHOWBUZZ performing arts center.

In January 2018, she appeared on Tshala Muana's Congolese rumba-inspired song "Don De Dieu", and the next month, she collaborated on Romain Gardon's single "Dis-moi maman". On 25 May, Mbilia Bel appeared on Iyenga's debut studio album Lonkaya. She subsequently performed at the second International Rumba Festival at Béatrice Hotel in Kinshasa, which paid tribute to her late husband and mentor, Tabu Ley Rochereau. On December 7, she headlined the final edition of the year's Kigali Jazz Junction in Kigali, where she shared the stage with Mike Kayihura and the Netunez Band.

On 31 January 2019, Mbilia Bel made a guest appearance on Ninita's single "Pardonne-moi", which Ninita described as her most successful collaboration in an interview with Les Dépêches de Brazzaville. On 23 March, she was the headliner at the "Concert de la Francophonie" alongside Jean Goubald Kalala and Fanie Fayar at the Halle de la Gombe in Kinshasa. This event, organized by Orchestre Symphonique Kimbanguiste, spotlighted notable French music and honored Congolese artists. On 1 December, Mbilia Bel headlined the second day of the 28th edition of the Koroga Festival at the Bomas of Kenya, sharing the stage with her London-based countryman Kanda Bongo Man.

In February 2020 she appeared as one of the main acts at Festival Amani where she was appreciated by the 36,000 attendees. Her set included popular 1980s tracks "Mpeve Ya Longo" and "Yamba Ngai". She was scheduled to perform at Casino de Montbenon on 14 March in Lausanne, Switzerland, but the event was called off because of the COVID-19 pandemic. On 25 August, she performed with Les Bantous de la Capitale and other Brazzaville and Kinshasa artists at Maïsha Life in Kinshasa to mark Congolese rumba singer Jeannot Bombenga's 86th birthday.

=== 2021–present: Big Mama ===
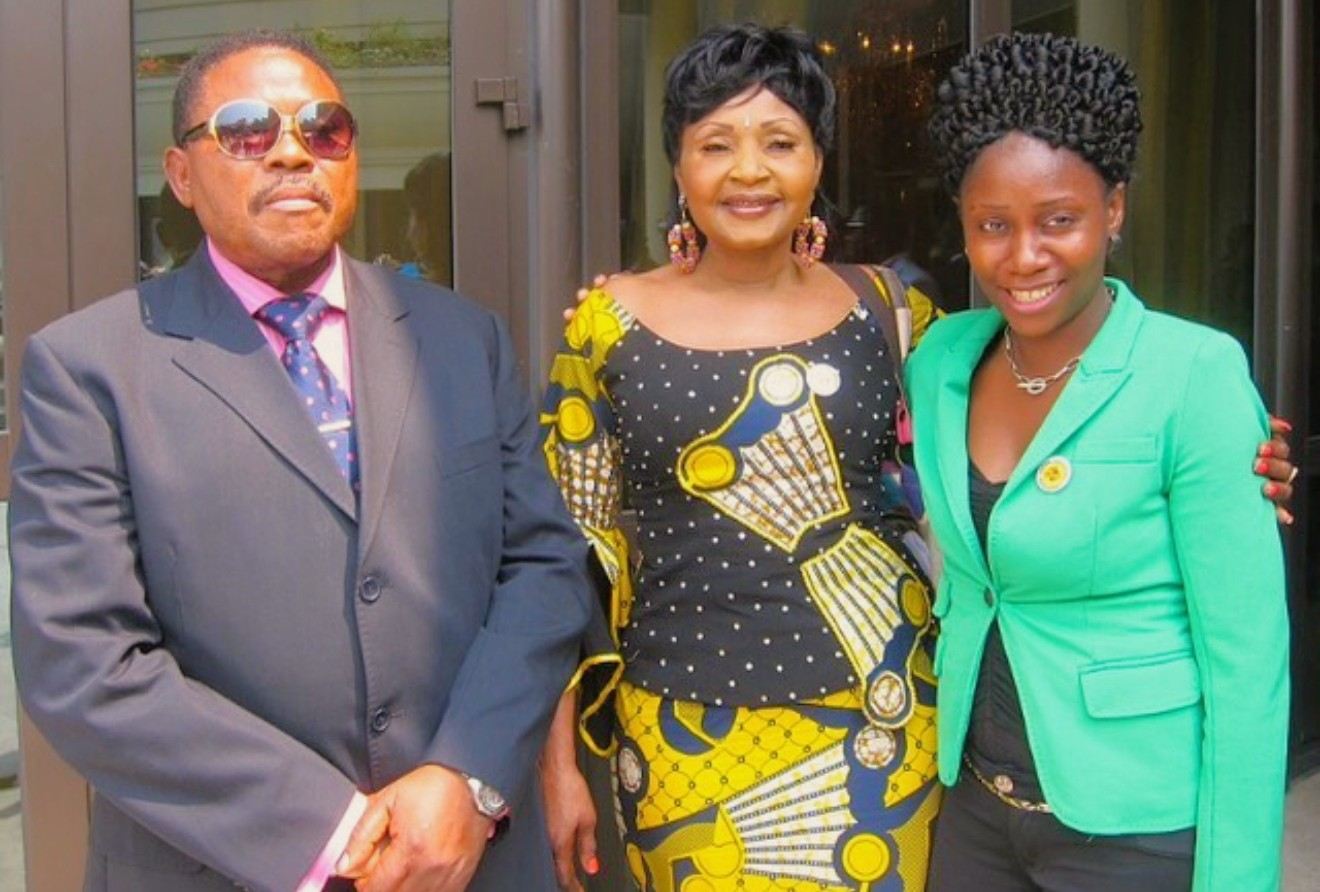
Mbilia Bel with Verckys Kiamuangana Mateta (left) in May 2019

In September 2020, Mbilia Bel, along with her manager, Jules Nsana, made an official visit to the Congolese First Lady, Denise Nyakéru Tshisekedi, where she announced plans to celebrate her 40th anniversary in the music industry with a concert on her birthday. Denise endorsed the event, which was set to take place at Pullman Kinshasa Grand Hotel. However, the concert was postponed to 13 February 2021 due to the COVID-19 pandemic. On 3 February 2021, Mbilia Bel released the maxi-single Big Mama as a gesture to console her fandom following the event's delay. Big Mama was produced by Nsana Production and her agent, Mélody Tabu.

On 5 July 2022, Mbilia Bel was part of the entourage of Kenya's former Prime Minister Raila Odinga's Azimio la Umoja–One Kenya Coalition Party in Central Kenya in Nyeri to back Raila ahead of the 2022 Kenyan general election. Mbilia Bel was summoned to the podium by Odinga, where her 1984 smash hit "Nakei Nairobi" was played. She then encouraged Nyeri residents to vote for Odinga and Martha Karua. In November 2022, she collaborated with Werrason, Reddy Amisi, Rebo Tchulo, Jeannot Bombenga, Héritier Watanabe, Awilo Longomba, Sista Becky, Poison Mobutu, Mianda Kabamba and Samarino on "Allons Tous Nous Faire Enrôler", a song composed for CENI's campaign to raise awareness among the population about the identification and enrollment operation for the 2023 Democratic Republic of the Congo general election.

Mbilia Bel was set to perform at Monumental Bullring in Cartagena de Indias, Colombia, on 30 June 2024 as the main act on the second day of the Festival Vive La Salsa with other co-headliners. However, her set was postponed due to challenges obtaining a travel visa from the Colombian Embassy in Kenya. El Universal reported that civil protests were happening in Nairobi, where the embassy is based. These protests, incited by a contentious finance bill, disrupted operations and rendered it infeasible for M'bilia Bel to travel to Cartagena de Indias in time for the festival.

== Personal life ==
While performing with Afrisa International, Mbilia Bel began a romantic relationship with Tabu Ley Rochereau. They became engaged in 1984 and had a daughter, Melody Tabu, in the mid-1980s. Around 1988, their relationship had ended and coincided with her decision to leave Afrisa International. Some media reports attributed the split to Tabu Ley's decision to add singer Faya Tess to Afrisa International, although both Mbilia Bel and Rochereau publicly denied any conflict at the time. After their split, she briefly considered marrying Gustave Bongo, a nephew of former Gabonese President Omar Bongo as his third wife, allegedly due to significant financial incentives. She later withdrew from the arrangement to focus on advancing her solo career. In a 2025 interview on TV47 Kenya, Mbilia Bel said that marriage does not suit her lifestyle.

== Discography ==
=== With Afrisa International ===
- Bel Ley (1982)
- Eswi Yo Wapi (1983)
- Faux Pas (1983)
- Loyenghe (1983)
- Ba Gerants Ya Mabala (1984)
- Keyna (1984)
- Boya Ye (1985)
- La Beauté D'Une Femme (1985)
- Nadina (1986)
- Beyanga (1987)
- Contre ma volonté (1987)

=== Solo albums ===
- Phénomène (1988)
- Désolé!!! (1991)
- 8/10 Benedicta (1993)
- Yalowa (1996)
- Welcome (2001)
- Belissimo (2004)
- The Queen (2011)
- Signature 8646 (2017)

=== Collaborative albums ===
- Exploration (with Madilu System, Rigo Star) (1989)
- Ironie (with Rigo Star) (1993)

=== Maxi-single ===
- Royaume d'amour (2014)
- Big Mama (2021)

=== Contributing artist ===
- 2008: The Rough Guide to Congo Gold (World Music Network)

== Awards and nominations ==
Year	Event	Prize	Recipient	Result	Ref.
1997	Association des Chroniqueurs de Musique du Congo	Best Female Singer	Herself	Won	
2002	Association des Chroniqueurs de Musique du Congo	Best Female Singer	Herself	Won	
2003	Kora Awards	Best Central Africa Female	Herself	Won	
2005	Kora Awards	Best Female Artist	Herself	Nominated	
2007	Kisima Music Awards	Best Collaboration	"Kokoka" (with Suzanna Owíyo)	Nominated	
