= Bagata =

Bagata may refer to:

- Bagata people, one of the Scheduled Tribes of India living primarily in Andhra Pradesh
- Bagata, Kwilu, a town in Kwilu Province, Democratic Republic of the Congo
- Bagata Territory, a territory in Kwilu Province, Democratic Republic of the Congo
- Bagata (South Ossetia), a settlement in the Tskhinvali district of South Ossetia
