= Lutumba (surname) =

Lutumba is a surname. Notable people with the surname include:

- Joseph Lutumba, Congolese lyricist
- Simaro Lutumba (1938–2019), Congolese soukous rhythm guitarist, songwriter and bandleader
