= Man from Kinshasa =

Compilation album by Tabu Ley Rochereau
- Released: 1991
- Studio: Harry Son
- Genre: Soukous
- Label: Shanachie

Tabu Ley Rochereau chronology
Babeti Soukous (1989)	Man from Kinshasa (1991)	Muzina (1994)

Man from Kinshasa is a compilation album by the Congolese musician Tabu Ley Rochereau. It was released in 1991. Rochereau supported the album with a North American tour.

== Production ==
The compilation's songs were taken from albums Rochereau released between 1988 and 1991. Rochereau sang in Lingala and French. Huit Kilos played guitar on the songs. Rochereau used a drum machine on some of the tracks.

== Critical reception ==
Professional ratings
Review scores
Source	Rating
AllMusic	3/5 stars
Robert Christgau	A−
DownBeat	3.5/5 stars
The Encyclopedia of Popular Music	3/5 stars
Entertainment Weekly	B
MusicHound World: The Essential Album Guide	3/5 stars

Robert Christgau wrote: "Catchy tunes, plangent pace changes, Cuban/Ethiopian horns, musette accordion—and enough rippling guitar to keep them coming back for more." Entertainment Weekly opined that "it’s not until the chugging climax of 'Ponce-Pilate', the sixth song in, that the album at last puts across the insane happiness that marks great soukous."

The Gazette stated that "Rochereau's large Afrisa International Orchestra—16 members in all—provides a sumptuous backdrop for lively, lilting songs." The Washington Post determined that "Rochereau has a warm, sweet tenor that lends a tone of sly bemusement to his tales about gossips, seducers and beauties."

AllMusic wrote that Rochereau "dares accordion-driven soukous on one of the many highlights here, including 'Tour Eiffel'."

== Track listing ==
No.	Title	Length
1.	"Seli-Ja"
2.	"Londende"
3.	"Tour Eiffel"
4.	"Lisolo Ya Ngungi"
5.	"Kinshasa"
6.	"Ponce-Pilate"
7.	"Maputo"
8.	"Dernier Espoir 'Itou'"
