= Babeti Soukous =

Studio album by Tabu Ley Seigneur Rochereau and Afrisa International Orchestra
- Released: 5 June 1989
- Recorded: 30 January 1989
- Studio: Real World Studios, Wiltshire
- Genre: Soukous; Zairean pop
- Length: 57:26
- Label: Real World Records
- Producer: Tabu Ley Seigneur Rochereau

Tabu Ley Rochereau chronology
| Beyou Ciel Par Le Seigneur Ley Et L'Orchestre Afrisa International (1988) | Babeti Soukous (1989) | C'est Comme Ça La Vie (1989) |

Babeti Soukous is a 1989 studio/live album by DR Congolese soukous musician and pioneer Tabu Ley Rochereau (using the longer name of Tabu Ley Seigneur Rochereau) and his band the Afrisa International Orchestra. Recorded for the duration of only one night as a live studio session at Real World Studios, Wiltshire, England in 1989, the album was one of the four albums released to establish Peter Gabriel's world music label Real World Records, and was one of the first recordings Rochereau created after exiling to France in 1988. Rochereau used the album as an opportunity to re-record highlights from the previous 20 years of his career.

While the album is a soukous recording, described in its liner notes as "Zairean pop," it also features elements from other genres, such as Latin music, jazz, rock and R&B, as well as Congoloese dance rhythms such as madiaba and kwassa kwassa. The album also marked Rochereau's new preference for solo horns as opposed to ensemble horns. Upon release, the album received critical acclaim, with music critics acclaiming the album's vibrancy and experimentation. The recording was one of Rochereau's most successful albums and pathed the way for his later successful albums, including Muzina (1994) and Africa Worldwide (1996).

== Background and recording ==
In 1988, prolific musician Tabu Ley Rochereau exiled to France to escape Mobutu Sese Seko's regime in his native Democratic Republic of the Congo. Rochereau was one of the key originators of soukous, which evolved from Congolese rumba in the 1960s; the genre was described in one review of Babeti Soukous as a "highly danceable modern African style" and a "Central African sound." Meanwhile, English art rock musician Peter Gabriel was in the process of creating the world music record label Real World Records in collaboration with his arts festival organization WOMAD, founded in 1980 to celebrate different styles of music and dance around the world.

To launch Real World Records, Rochereau, whose catalogue spans over 150 releases, agreed to record an album for the label with his band Afrisa International Orchestra, better known as Orchestre Afrisa L'International. Rochereau and the Afrisa International Orchestra had recently recorded the album Beyou Ciel Par Le Seigneur Ley Et L'Orchestre Afrisa International (1988) with singer Beyou Ciel for the Genidia label, the first album Rochereau worked on since moving to France. Babeti Soukous continues the collaboration between Rochereau and Ciel.

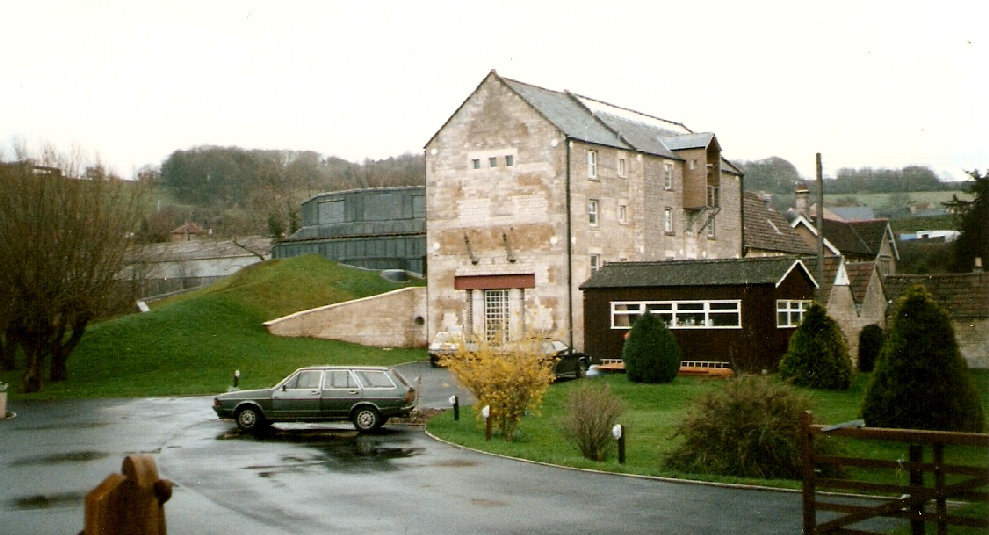
Real World Studios in 1990.

Babeti Soukous was recorded live in the main studio of Gabriel's Real World Records, Box, Wiltshire, on the night of 30 January 1989 in the attendance of friends and invitees, who danced and clapped in the studio's minstrel gallery. The decision to record the album in only one night was made to ensure that the album would capture "the heat of a Zairean cabaret." The record label would later describe that night as Rochereau's "unforgettable party." Rochereau's band set up during the afternoon, playing approximately 20 pieces throughout into the evening without break, achieving what Real World Records later referred to as their "intended blend of an authentic performed sound with the best of recording technology."

Several weeks after recording, Rochereau returned from Paris to Real World Studios to aid with the mixing of the album, where he adjusted the keyboard parts and solo lead guitar, leaving the rest of the mixing work engineer Dave Bottrill, "before heading for Chippenham railway station thoroughly satisfied with yet another smoothly professional piece of music-making." Richard Chappell aided Bottrill as assistant engineer. As opposed to a producer's credit, Rochereau is credited with "directing" the album due to it being a live performance. Rochereau performs lead vocals on most tracks, although lead vocals on four tracks are performed by other singers, namely Beyou Ciel, Monoko Dodo and Faya Tess. A total of eighteen performers feature on the album, and two dancers, Apewayi Matshi and Onya Amisi, are also credited in the booklet, as is Lossikiya Maneno for "musical assistance." Babeti Soukous was mastered at The Town Studios in West London.

== Music ==
According to Phillip Sweeney in the album's liner notes, the tracks that Rochereau chose to record for Babeti Soukous comprise "a broad retrospective of Zairean pop of the previous 20 years," and as such it has been described as a "live-in-the-studio best-of." The music combines contemporary "guitar-and-snare rum numbers," featuring fast, skipping rhythms and the dance-step calls of kwassa-kwassa, madiaba and tshuka, with the older style of rhumba-based soukous, which contains Latin-flavoured horn choruses and jazz-style saxophone solos that had lost popularity among many younger groups. The music is seasoned with elements from rock, R&B, traditional Zairean rhythms and "French variété." Jazz Forum summed up the music on the album as "a sophisticated blend of local dance steps and outside influences" and made note of the Latin, jazz, R&B and French elements.

The Chicago Tribune echoed these sentiments, saying that while the album displays "a lively and fairly comprehensive overview" of the development of soukous music, the music does also tend towards the slower, original form of soukous that Tabu Ley is more readily associated with. Alec Foege of Spin found parallels to American funk music via the album's syncopated horn section, drum breaks and electric guitars. The percussion on the album rumbles atop the beat with precise, constantly shifting snare and cymbal patterns. The recording also displays felicities such as Rochereau's new focus on and preference for solo horns, as opposed to ensemble horns. His voice is high and caressing throughout, while also being "curious and questioning at times," according to Folk Roots. Robert Christgau felt the album's "constituent parts" were its various guitar styles, dance beats, female vocal cameos and what he referred to as "the Smokey-styled ballad."

== Release ==
Released on 5 June 1989 in the United Kingdom, Babeti Soukous was one of the first four albums released to launch Real World Records, the others being Shanen Shah by Nusrat Fateh Ali Khan, La Explosion Del Momento! by Orquesta Reve and the various artists compilation Passion – Sources, compiled by Gabriel. The Chicago Tribune felt that, among the three other launch albums, La Explosion Del Momento! was the most like Babeti Soukous, as both records hark back to a more traditional sound while also revealing contemporary ideas. The artwork was designed by Garry Mouat at Assorted Images, with Rani Charrington designing the composite image on the cover. Rather than credit himself as Tabu Ley Rochereau, Rochereau adopts the extended name of Tabu Ley Seigneur Rochereau, a respectful name given to him by his junior musicians. In the book Historical Dictionary of the Democratic Republic of the Congo, writer Emizet Francois Kisangani wrote that Babeti Soukous was one of several albums by Rochereau that found him success, alongside Exil Ley (1993), Muzina (1994) and Africa Worldwide (1996).

== Critical reception ==
Professional ratings
Review scores
| Source | Rating |
|---|---|
| AllMusic | 4.5/5 stars |
| Chicago Tribune | 3/4 stars |
| Folk Roots | (favourable) |
| The New York Times | (favourable) |
| Q | (favourable) |
| Robert Christgau | B+ |

Babeti Soukous was released to critical acclaim; Q said that, "warm, tight, occasionally rollicking soukous that is about as good as a live set gets." The New York Times were favourable, noting that "even when it was zooming along, Afrisa International's soukous had a light touch." Folk Roots said: "This is delicious dance music of the most seductive kind - lots of rhumbas featuring Latin-inflected horn choruses and sexy sax solos." In his Consumer's Guide, critic Robert Christgau rated the album "B+", saying that he initially found the "hectically eclectic" album hard to listen to, "but when I gave it a chance its constituent parts snuck up on me–the procession of dance beats and guitar styles, the female vocal cameos, even the Smokey-styled/stolen ballad." Option Magazine wrote that the album "virtually recaps" Rochereau's career.

Chris Heim of the Chicago Tribune named Babeti Soukous the best of the four original Real World Records albums, and made note of the album's "excellent sound quality." Retrospective reviews have also been favourable; AllMusic's John Storm Roberts called Babeti Soukous a "fine performance with touches probably never heard from Rochereau before," and although finding the "DJ and 'live recording' conceit" to be unnecessary, he called the album "excellent". In the 1992 book World Beat: A Listener's Guide to Contemporary World Music on CD, writer Peter Spencer described Babeti Soukous as a "rewarding album." Meanwhile, in the 1998 book The World Music CD Listeren's Guide, writer Howard J. Blumenthal called the album "a real crowd-pleaser."

Several music critics have compared Babeti Soukous to other recordings. Christgau described the album as the "Zairean equivalent of Sunny Adé's Juju Music–an unguided tour through a long, deep pop tradition." In an article on Real World Records, Alec Foege of Spin compared the album to Homrong, an album recorded by the Musicians of the National Dance Company of Cambodia; he described Babeti Soukous as being "less exotic and more performance-oriented." In Tom Moon's 2008 book 1,000 Recordings to Hear Before You Die, Moon suggested to readers that they listen to Babeti Soukous after listening to Pepe Kalle's album Gigantafrique! (1990).

== Track listing ==
All songs written by Tabu Ley Seigneur Rochereau except where noted

1. "Presentation" – 1:11
2. "Kinshasa" – 4:06
3. "Sorozo" – 3:54
4. "Linga Ngai" (Munoko Dodo) – 6:10
5. "Moto Akokufa" – 5:34
6. "Nairobi" – 5:15
7. "Seli Ja" – 3:15
8. "I Need You" – 3:39
9. "Amour Nala" – 5:45
10. "Tu As Dit Que" – 4:29
11. "Sentimenta" – 5:18
12. "Pitié" – 4:47
13. "Mosolo" – 3:59

== Personnel ==
=== Performers ===
- Akazol Kalula – alto saxophone
- Shaba Kahamba Vzalu – bass
- Longi Makesa – congas
- Mavambu Lukombo – drums
- Nseka Huit-Kilos – guitar solo
- Fumunani Freddy – keyboard
- Beyou Ciel – lead vocals (track 11)
- Monoko Dodo – lead vocals (track 4), writer (track 4)
- Faya Tess – lead vocals (tracks 5 and 6)
- Taba Ley Siegneur Rochereau – lead vocals (tracks 1–3, 7–10, 12, 13), director, writer (tracks 1–3, 5–13)
- Lossikiya Maneno – musical assistance
- Apewayi Matshi – performer (dancer)
- Onya Amisi – performer (dancer)
- Madoka Kaïen – rhythm guitar
- Makondele Dave – rhythm guitar
- Mekanisi Modero – tenor saxophone, presenter (announcements)
- Kabasele Kaber – trumpet
- Ntumba Mwamba – trumpet
- Lukombo Djeffar – vocals
- Bonane Wawali – vocals

=== Production and design ===
- Mouat – design
- Rani Charrington – cover (composite)
- Richard Chappel – engineer assistant
- David Bottrill – engineer, mixing
- Celline Bourdon – liner notes
- Philip Sweeney – liner notes
- Francis Drake – photography
