= Debout Congolais =

National anthem of the Democratic Republic of the Congo

English: Arise Congolese
- National anthem of the Democratic Republic of the Congo
- Also known as: (English: Stand Up, Congolese!)
- Lyrics: Joseph Lutumba, 1960
- Music: Simon-Pierre Boka, 1960
- Adopted: 1960
- Readopted: 1997
- Relinquished: 1971
- Preceded by: "La Zaïroise" (1971–1997), "La Katangaise" (1960-1963)
- Succeeded by: "La Zaïroise" (1971-1997)

Audio sample
- file; help

"Debout Congolais" (French pronunciation: [dəbu kɔ̃ɡɔlɛ]; Kongo: Telama besi Kongo; lit. 'Arise, Congolese') is the national anthem of the Democratic Republic of the Congo. It was originally adopted in 1960 upon independence from Belgium but was replaced by "La Zaïroise" when the Congo changed its name to Zaire in 1971. It was finally reinstated when the Congo was reorganised in 1997. The lyrics were written by historian and professor Joseph Lutumba, and the music was composed by Jesuit father Simon-Pierre Boka, who also wrote and composed "La Zaïroise".

== Lyrics ==
French lyrics

Debout Congolais,
Unis par le sort,
Unis dans l'effort pour l'indépendance.
Dressons nos fronts, longtemps courbés
Et pour de bon prenons le plus bel élan,
Dans la paix.
Ô peuple ardent
Par le labeur
Nous bâtirons un pays plus beau qu'avant
Dans la paix.

Citoyens,
Entonnez l'hymne sacré de votre solidarité
Fièrement
Saluez l'emblème d'or de votre souveraineté

Congo,
Don béni, Congo !
Des aïeux, Congo !
Ô pays, Congo !
Bien-aimé, Congo ! Nous peuplerons ton sol
et nous assurerons ta grandeur.
Trente juin, ô doux soleil
Trente juin, du trente juin
Jour sacré, sois le témoin,
Jour sacré, de l'immortel
Serment de liberté
Que nous léguons
À notre postérité
Pour toujours

Kikongo lyrics

Telama besi Kongo,
Mvukani, mu n'kadilu,
Mvukani, mu kikesa mu diambu dia kimpwanza.

Tuvumbula mbunsu,
Zafumbana ntama,
Ye tuka buabu Tusasuka tuamanta, Mu yenge,
N'kangu kikesa,
Muna Kisalu,
Sa tutunga Nsi, ya mpuena luta ntama, mu yenge.

Besi nsi,
Luyimbila, nkunga wa n'longo, Wa nsalasana eno,
Ye lulendo, Lukunda, kidimbu kia wolo kia kimfumu kieno.

Kongo,
N'kayilu usambuka,
Kongo,
Wa bakulu,
Kongo,
Nsi ya zolua,
Kongo,
Sa tuasema ntoto aku ye sa tuasikila m'vuma aku
Nsuka (ya) yuni muini wa buita,
Makumatatu ('k'matatu) ma yuni,
Lumbu kia n'longo kala mbangi,
Lumbu kia n'longo kia kuele mvu,
Ya ndefi ya kimpwanza,
Tusisila,
Kua batekolo beto.
Mvu ye mvu

Lingala lyrics

Totelema mwana kongo,
Tosangani na pasi,
Tosangani na bokasi po na bonsomi,
Tombola moto,
Egumbama kala,
Mpo na libela tokomata lolenge malamu,
Na kimia,
Batu ya nguya,
Na mosala,
Tokotonga mboka kitoko koleka lobi eleka,
Na kimia,
Mwana mboka,
Yemba nzembo,
Nzembo ya lokumu na bino bosangani,
Na lolendo, kumisa,
Bendele na yo ya tina ya bonsomi kongo,
Epambwanma, kongo,
Ya ba koko, kongo,
Mboka, kongo,
Elingama, kongo,
Tokotondisa mabele nayo, mpe tokobatela, monene na yo,
Mokolo mua tuku misato, na sanza ya motoba,
Mokolo mua moyi ya kimia, mokolo mua lokumu,
Zalá de nzenenteke, mokolo mua lokumu,
Mpe ya ndayi ya bosomi,
Tokotikela ba kitani na biso po na libela

Swahili lyrics

Simameni, Wakongo, kwa wimbo wa fahari,
Tuimbe kwa sauti, kwa umoja wa dhati.
Tumepata uhuru, kwa juhudi na jasho,
Nchi yetu ni mali yetu, tusimame nayo imara.

(Kibwagizo)
Kongo, eeh! nchi yetu mpendwa,
Tutakulinda kwa bidii, hadi mwisho wa maisha.
Na tuishi kwa amani, mshikamano na upendo,
Kwa ajili ya taifa letu, na kizazi kijacho.
Tuilinde bendera, ishara ya ushindi,
Tuchangie maendeleo, kwa nguvu zetu zote.
Kila mmoja ana jukumu, kujenga taifa bora,
Kwa kazi, maadili, na heshima kwa wote.

(Kibwagizo)
Kongo, eeh! nchi yetu mpendwa,
Tutakulinda kwa bidii, hadi mwisho wa maisha.
Na tuishi kwa amani, mshikamano na upendo,
Kwa ajili ya taifa letu, na kizazi kijacho.

English translation of French lyrics:

Arise, Congolese!
United by fate,
United for the struggle of independence
Let's hold up our heads, so long bowed
And now, for good, let's keep advance boldly,
In peace
Oh ardent people, by hard work we shall build
Our country more beautiful than before, in peace

Countrymen, we all sing the sacred hymn of your solidarity
Countrymen, proudly salute the golden emblem of your sovereignty,

Congo!
Blessed gift, Congo!
Of our forefathers, Congo!
Oh fatherland, Congo!
Oh beloved, Congo!
We shall populate your soil and ensure your eternal greatness
Thirtieth of June, oh eternal sun,
Thirtieth of June, thirtieth of June,
Holy day, the historical witness
Holy day, immortal day
Is the oath of freedom
That we pass on to our future generation,
Forever!
