= Tabu Ley Rochereau =

Congolese singer-songwriter (1940–2013)

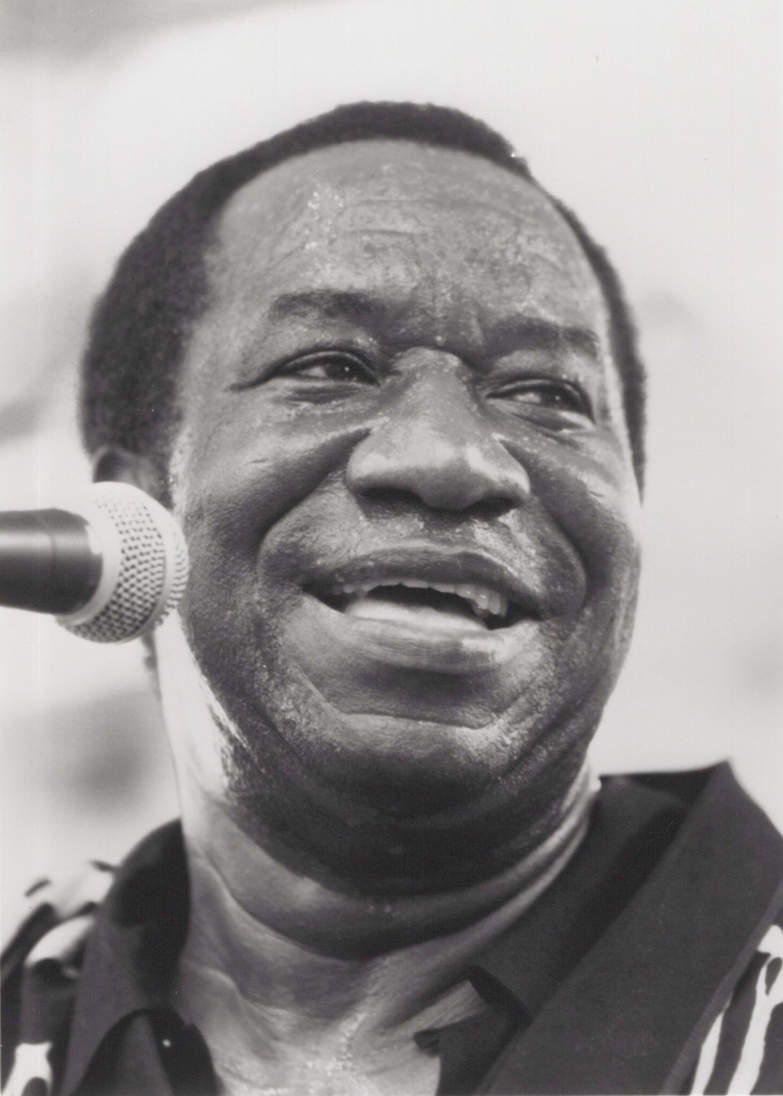
- Rochereau in 1980

Background information
- Also known as: Le Seigneur Rochereau; Vieux Maze
- Born: Pascal-Emmanuel Sinamoyi Tabu; 13 November 1940; Bagata, Belgian Congo (modern-day Democratic Republic of the Congo)
- Died: 30 November 2013 (aged 73) Brussels, Belgium
- Genres: Congolese rumba; soukous
- Occupations: Singer-songwriter; record executive; bandleader
- Years active: 1956–2008
- Labels: Vita; Éditions Flash; Ngoma; Éditions Isa; African; Édition Ley; Genidia; Disco Stock; SonoDisc; Real World Records; Editions Kaluila; Rounder Records; Espace Culturel Glenn; Next Music
- Formerly of: African Jazz; African Fiesta; African Fiesta National; Orchestre Afrisa International

Pascal-Emmanuel Sinamoyi Tabu (13 November 1940 – 30 November 2013), known professionally as Tabu Ley Rochereau, was a Congolese singer-songwriter, record executive, and bandleader who became one of the most influential figures in Congolese rumba. Noted for his clarion baritone voice and prolific songwriting, he led or co-led several prominent bands, including African Fiesta with guitarist Nico Kasanda, African Fiesta National, and Orchestre Afrisa International. Dubbed "Le Seigneur Rochereau", "Vieux Maze", and "King of Congolese rumba", he is credited with composing more than 3,000 songs and recording 250 albums during a career spanning over five decades. In 2023, Rolling Stone ranked him 178th on its list of the 200 Greatest Singers of All Time.

Tabu Ley was born in Bagata, Kwilu, and made his official debut with Le Grand Kallé's African Jazz at the Vis-à-Vis dance hall in Kinshasa on 6 June 1959 and became a permanent member of the band following its return from Brussels in 1960. His songwriting and distinctive vocal style brought him early recognition. In 1963, he and Kasanda co-founded African Fiesta, and, following disagreements between the two bandleaders, African Fiesta split in 1966, with Kasanda leading African Fiesta Sukisa and Tabu Ley establishing African Fiesta National. In 1969, Tabu Ley founded International Service Artistic (ISA), a company that also operated as a record label, and subsequently assembled the female dance troupe Les Rocherettes.

In 1970, he established Orchestre Afrisa International, which became one of the leading bands in Congolese and African popular music. On 12 December 1970, he began a series of performances at the Olympia Hall in Paris, becoming the first sub-Saharan African and the second African artist, after Egyptian singer Umm Kulthum, to perform at the venue. During the 1970s and 1980s, Tabu Ley introduced musical and choreographic innovations to Congolese rumba, including the soum-djoum style, founded the record label Genidia, and collaborated with or promoted numerous musicians. Singer Mbilia Bel, who joined Afrisa in the early 1980s, became one of the band's most prominent vocalists. He also recorded several albums with his longtime rival Franco Luambo during the 1980s.

After becoming increasingly critical of President Mobutu Sese Seko's government, Tabu Ley went into exile with Afrisa in 1988 and thereafter lived and worked abroad. Following Mobutu's overthrow in 1997, Tabu Ley returned to the Democratic Republic of the Congo and entered politics. He later served as vice-governor of Kinshasa and as provincial minister for Youth and Sports and for Culture and Arts. In 2008, he suffered a stroke from which he never fully recovered. He died on 30 November 2013 at Cliniques universitaires Saint-Luc.

== Musical career ==
=== 1940–1958: Early life and career beginnings ===
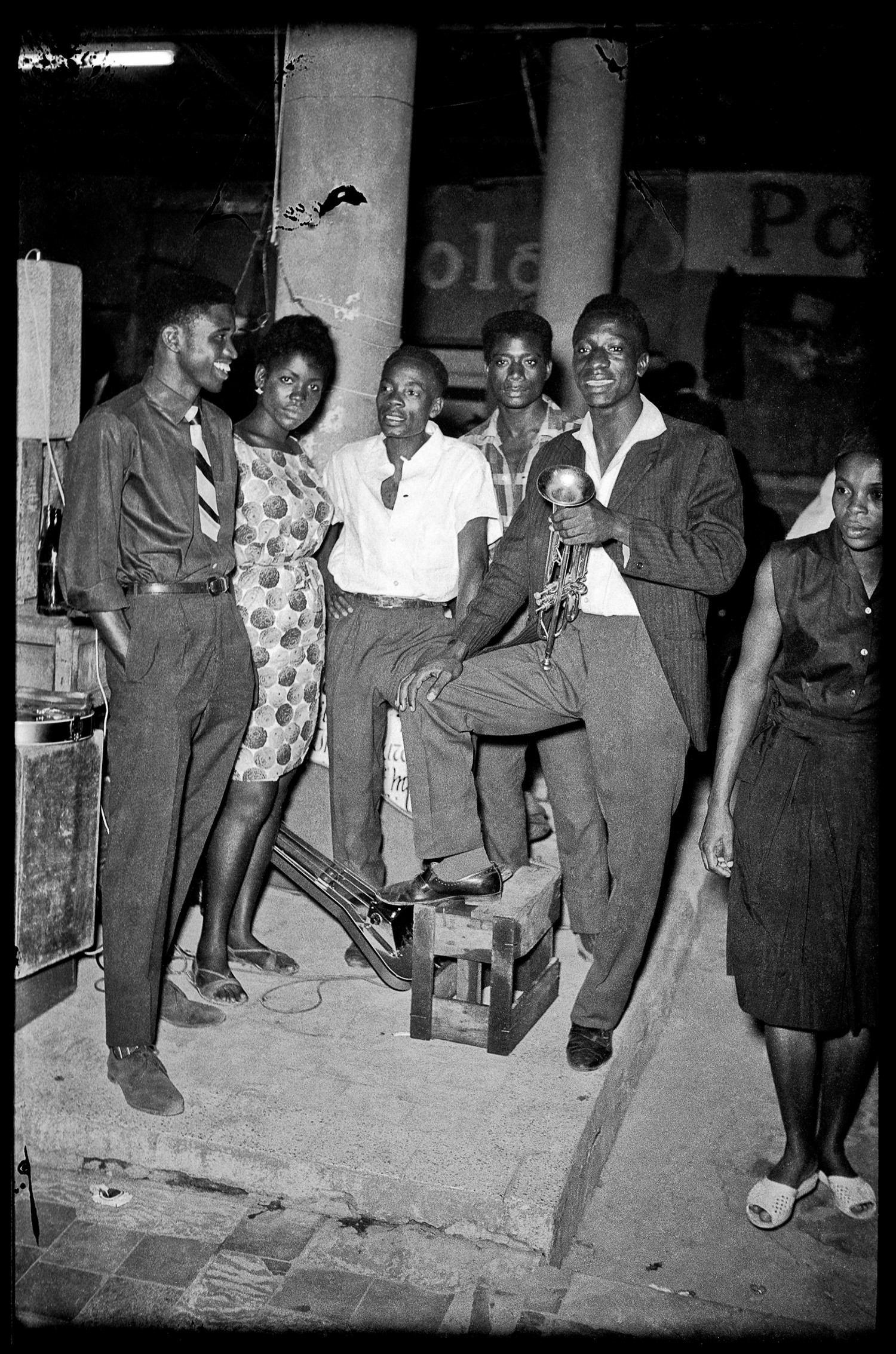
Tabu Ley Rochereau (far right) at the entrance of the dancing bar in Léopoldville

Pascal-Emmanuel Sinamoyi Tabu was born on 13 November 1940 in Bagata, Kwilu in the then-Belgian Congo. He attended the École Moyenne Saint Raphaël in Limete, where his education later helped him secure a position in the secretariat of the Athenaeum of Kalina (Athénée de Kalina). Music journalist Clément Ossinondé wrote that Tabu Ley became interested in singing while he was still a student. He initially performed as an amateur and frequently sang with his classmate Joseph Mulamba "Mujos". Around the same time, he also sang with a small band called Afric'Ambiance, mainly out of personal interest, and performed in a bar on the corner of École and Kigoma streets in the Kinshasa commune. He later adopted the stage name "Rochereau" after the French General Pierre Denfert-Rochereau because he liked the name and had learned about him in school. During those years, Western films were very popular in the city's cinemas, including Macoley on Kigoma Street, Siluvangi on Croix-Rouge, and Mbongo Mpasi on Ruzizi Street in the Casamar quartier of Barumbu. Many young people followed the Bills fashion subculture, and Tabu Ley often appeared wearing a scarf around his neck.

Ossinondé also noted that Tabu Ley's voice gave him the opportunity to collaborate with Rock-a-Mambo on multiple recordings.

=== 1959–1964: From African Jazz to African Fiesta ===
He made his official debut with Le Grand Kallé's African Jazz on 6 June 1959 at the Vis-à-Vis dance hall in Kinshasa, where he appeared alongside Mujos. During the performance, he sang "Kelya" in a duet with Le Grand Kallé for the first time, and the song later became one of the best-known performances of his career. Although he made his debut in 1959, he only became a permanent member of African Jazz after the group's return from Brussels in 1960. He then recorded with Kallé and Mujos at Éditions Esengo. The band's lineup included singers Franklin Boukaka and Jeannot Bombenga, guitarists Casimir Mutshipule "Casino", André Kambeta "Damoiseau", and "Papa" Bouanga, bassist Charles Kibongé, and other musicians. African Jazz went on to record several popular songs written by Tabu Ley, including "Mwana Mawa", "Catalina Cha Cha", and "Marie Josée", and routinely appeared at the Amuzu dance hall on Kitega Street in Kinshasa.

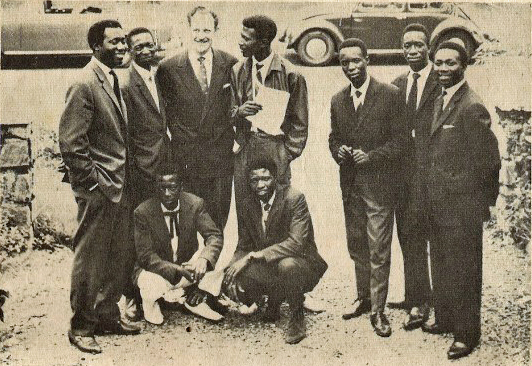
African Jazz in June 1961, with Tabu Ley standing second from right, behind Nico Kasanda and Roger Izeidi.

In 1961, African Jazz returned to Brussels for a second tour, joined by Tino Baroza, Dicky Nicolas Tshilumba "Dicky Baroza", Edouard Lutula "Edo Clari", Joseph Mwena, and Manu Dibango. Throughout the tour, they recorded several works, including Baroza's "Lolo Brigida", dedicated in tribute to Gina Lollobrigida, Kallé's "Mayele Mabe", "Africa Bola Ngombi" (alternatively titled as "Africa Bola Ngongi"), and Baroza's "Jamais Kolonga". The latter, which translates to "never defeated", was inspired by the life and work of Jean Lema, a journalist for Radio Congo Belge who provided the live radio transmission of the Congo's independence ceremonies on 30 June 1960 and was a close confidant of Kallé. While in Brussels, intra-group disputes within African Jazz in Kinshasa prompted several members to establish the splinter group called African Jazz–Nico. After Kallé returned, the rival factions reconciled in June 1961, and in September, the reunited band celebrated their reunion with a concert featuring Déchaud's emblematic composition "African Jazz Mokili Mobimba" (denoting "African Jazz all over the world"), which was initially performed by Tabu Ley before later being interpreted by Kallé. Contemporaneously, Nico Kasanda organized another African Jazz-inspired ensemble that included Déchaud, Tabu Ley, Kaya Depuissant, and Willy Mbembe. The rival lineups ultimately reconvened in 1962 for a West African tour that yielded hits such as "Paracommando", "Sala noki Pascal", "Nkulu Norbert", and "Succès ya African Jazz".

After nearly a decade as one of the Congo's leading orchestras and an influential force in African popular music, African Jazz began facing organizational problems. In May 1963, most of its members left the group and joined Tabu Ley and Nico Kasanda in African Fiesta, which the pair had initially established the previous year while still members of African Jazz. The new band included Tabu Ley, Roger Izeidi, Charles Mwamba "Dechaud", Mujos, Jean Mossi Kwami "Kwamy Munsi", Antoine Kaya "Depuissant", Mbembe, Louis Armando, and many others. African Fiesta quickly gained popularity through its first Vita label releases, including "Seli Kutu", "Camalée", "Ndaya Paradis", "Ya Gaby", and "Permission", which helped establish Tabu Ley as one of the band's leading singers and songwriters.

=== 1965–1969: African Fiesta National, "Mokolo Nako Kufa", and song contest for Expo 67 ===
African Fiesta's early prominence was short-lived. By 1965, growing internal disputes between Nico Kasanda and Tabu Ley over the band's leadership had become impossible to settle. The group broke apart, and in 1966 it officially split into two rival bands. Nico Kasanda led African Fiesta Sukisa with Charles Mwamba "Dechaud", Pierre Bazeta "De la France", André Lumingu "Zoro", Victor Kasanda "Vixon", Joseph Minguiedi "Jeef", Pedro Matafula "Cailloux", Gabriel Kayunga "Francky", Paul Mizele "Paulins", Michel Banda "Micky", Joseph Ayombe "José", Dominique Dionga "Apôtre", Lambert Kalamoy "Vigny", and Georges Armando. Meanwhile, Tabu Ley formed African Fiesta National that brought together Roger Izeidi, Henriette "Miss Bora" Bora Uzima, René Kasanda, Sam Mangwana, Joseph Mwena, Auguste Futu "Faugus" Izeidi, Paul Vangu "Guivano", Johnny Bukasa, Jean-Pierre Nzenze "Jean Trompette", Mbembe, Samu Armando, Henri Dongala "Fredos", Jean Matondo "Zoé", and Antoine Kolosoy "Wendo".

That same year, Tabu Ley released the hit single "Mokolo Nako Kufa", meaning "the day I die", through his newly established record label Éditions Isa. According to Agence d'Information d'Afrique Centrale, Faugus composed the song after developing a rhythm while playing guitar at home that seized Tabu Ley's attention. With Guivano present, Tabu Ley asked Faugus whether he could create a song around the rhythm, and Faugus agreed. Tabu Ley initially proposed a romantic theme, but Faugus suggested exploring death instead, inspiring the song "Mokolo Nako Kufa". Tabu Ley performs the vocals, with Faugus on rhythm guitar and Guivano on lead guitar. Their guitars engage in a plaintive call-and-response pattern that gives the impression of sobbing while reinforcing the underlying rhythm. The lyrics contemplate mortality by asking who would mourn Tabu Ley after his death and imagining how people from different walks of life, including the poor, wealthy, drunkard, and free-spirited woman, might perceive death. For the poor, death may represent liberation from hardship, whereas for the wealthy, it signifies the loss of material possessions. In 1976, Mangwana recorded a blues-influenced reinterpretation for Sonafric, a subsidiary of SonoDisc, although Agence d'Information d'Afrique Centrale noted that it did not achieve the same level of popularity as Tabu Ley's original.

In 1967, the Congolese government began preparing to host the Organization of African Unity (OAU) summit in Kinshasa. As part of the preparations, the Ministry of Culture organized a competition to select an official anthem under the theme Congo Nouveau, Afrique nouvelle ("New Congo, New Africa"), whose winning composition would represent the country at Expo 67 in Montreal. Held at the Kinshasa Zoological Garden, the competition brought together African Fiesta National and leading bands including Orchestre Vox Africa and Négro-Succès. They won first place with the French-language patriotic song "Congo Avenir", which urged national unity and revitalization. The band thereafter represented the Congo at Expo 67, performed in Québec City, and, on their return journey, stopped in Brussels to record new material before heading back to Kinshasa. A year later, they went on a West African tour that took them from Brazzaville to Abidjan, after which, in 1969, Tabu Ley founded his own organization, International Service Artistic (ISA), along with an eponymous record label. He then assembled a female dance troupe, which he named Les Rocherettes; one of its members later became one of French pop singer Claude François' Claudettes.

=== 1970–1979: Orchestre Afrisa International, Olympia Hall concert, soum-djoum dance style ===
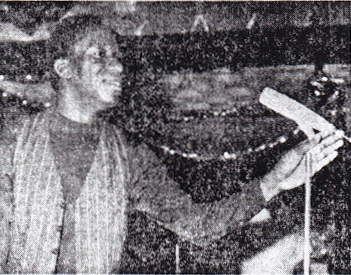
Rochereau performing at the Paris Olympia in 1970

In 1970, Tabu Ley formed Orchestre Afrisa International, Afrisa being a portmanteau of "Africa" and "Éditions Isa". Seeking to expand his reputation beyond Africa, Tabu Ley set his sights on performing at Paris' Olympia Hall. Two Ivorians, Samba and Léon Xacis, invited Bruno Coquatrix, the owner and manager of the Olympia Hall, to Kinshasa. Tabu Ley and Orchestre Afrisa International gave him a private preview performance at the Suzanella bar. After being impressed by their talent, Coquatrix approved their appearance at the Olympia Hall, while President Mobutu Sese Seko provided his presidential estate to Tabu Ley and Orchestre Afrisa International for eight months to prepare for the performance. On 12 December of that year, he sold out the venue, becoming the first sub-Saharan African and the second African artist after Egyptian singer Umm Kulthum to appear there. The opening act was French singer Julien Clerc. Several prominent French entertainers attended the concert, including Claude François, Alain Delon, Mireille Mathieu, and Sylvie Vartan.

Among the songs he performed with Orchestre Afrisa International was "Asambalela", which opened with a propulsive, staccato rhythmic pattern before transitioning into the Congolese rumba "Rivera". During the middle of the concert, Tabu Ley thanked the audience for attending in such large numbers over several consecutive nights. He then introduced "Fétiche", inspired by a poem by Senegalese President Léopold Sédar Senghor, and "Pitié", both of which were written in French so that French-speaking members of the audience could relate to them more easily. According to music journalist Michel Botowamungu Kalome, Tabu Ley viewed himself as a representative of Africa and performed songs from across the continent. These included Senegalese singer Laba Sosseh's "Seyni Kay Fonema", Cameroonian singer Eboa Lotin's "Munyenge Ma Ngando" and "Matumba Matumba", Congo-Brazzaville singer Pamelo Mounk'a's "Masuwa", and fellow Congo-Kinshasa musician Franco Luambo's "Oboa oshunzeme". Kalome noted that the audience responded so enthusiastically to "Munyenge Ma Ngando" that Tabu Ley performed it twice. Tabu Ley subsequently performed for 25 consecutive days, and, according to Chadrack Mpereng of Eventsrdc Radio, the concert series "paved the way for other African artists to break through the glass ceiling".

Following his Parisian tour, Tabu Ley and Orchestre Afrisa International toured the country with songs including "Silikani", "Mundi", "Chéri Samba", and "Seli Ja". The guitar accompaniment in "Silikani" recalled a popular Otis Redding recording from the late 1960s, but Attel Mbumba's solo accelerated the rhythm, transforming its two-beat feel into a three-beat pattern. President Senghor, impressed by Tabu Ley's attainments, sent him a congratulatory letter and invited him to Senegal. Their visit to Dakar, especially their experience at the Soumbédioune street market, became the source of inspiration for the soumbé djoumé, or soum-djoum dance music. Faugus developed the style, which was subsequently adopted by influential bands such as Orchestre Bella Bella, Les Grands Maquisards, Orchestre Continental, TPOK Jazz, and Zaïko Langa Langa. Journalist Sylvain Bemba pointed out that Tabu Ley introduced a significant rhythmic innovation to a region long dominated by Congolese rumba and its derivatives, with the soum-djoum rhythm from Dakar helping "open the door to ciao and cavacha". By this time, Orchestre Afrisa International had become one of Africa's leading bands, along with TPOK Jazz. They recorded several hits, including the 1973 "Kaful Mayay" and "Aon Aon". They later performed at Zaire 74, and this performance was shown in the documentary film Soul Power.

In 1975, Tabu Ley and Mangwana reunited to record the hit single "Mose Konzo", backed by Orchestre Afrisa International. The next year, Tabu Ley opened the Type K nightclub and, in 1977, became president of Société Nationale des Éditeurs et Auteurs Congolais (SONECA), Zaire's performing-rights society. Tabu Ley and Franco were then tasked with forming a national orchestra to represent Zaire at FESTAC 77 in Lagos, but their inability to agree on the orchestra's composition resulted in Orchestre National du Zaire being divided into two wings, with Tabu Ley leading one and Franco the other. The rivalry between the two prompted each to assemble a lineup of musicians, with Tabu Ley recruiting Zaïko Langa Langa, as well as Abeti Masikini and her band Les Redoutables, while TPOK Jazz was joined by M'Pongo Love. Tabu Ley's Congolese rumba and soukous-infused smash hit "Ponce Pilate" also premiered that year.

=== 1980–1983: International distribution, "Maze", and Mbilia Bel's emergence ===
When Fonior/Decca France went bankrupt in 1980, both Afrisa and TPOK Jazz lost their international distribution network. Daniel Cuxac had established the Disco Stock label in 1979, initially targeting domestic and international audiences, with distribution in France and in the U.S. through a partnership with Rodger Francis' Makossa label and African Records Centre stores in Brooklyn, Manhattan, and Washington, D.C. Disco Stock's catalogue included independent recordings as well as licensed albums from producers in Abidjan and Zaire. Following Franco and TPOK Jazz's 1980 visit to Abidjan, Cuxac acquired the international rights to issue TPOK Jazz's first series of original albums. Tabu Ley entered into a similar agreement, allowing his previously released ISA 45-rpm singles from 1978–1982 to be collected and repackaged for international albums releases. The partnership led to the establishment of Genidia, which managed Tabu Ley and Afrisa's recordings throughout the 1980s and repackaged individual 45-rpm singles as full-length albums, including the eight-volume Tabu Ley à Abidjan series. Although the songs were issued internationally on Disco Stock albums, they continued to appear on 45-rpm records in Congo, where the format remained in use even as it had effectively ceased to be commercially viable in West Africa, Europe, and North America.

According to music journalist Frédéric Mafina, Tabu Ley's self-produced 1981 album Maze (Genidia IS 004) helped secure a Disco Stock distribution deal in 1982 after the album's eponymous hit single gained "growing success on the international scene". A new Disco Stock 33-rpm release (DS7936) followed, featuring "Maze" alongside three other tracks. "Maze" was well received in Zaire and Congo-Brazzaville and achieved moderate success elsewhere in Africa. Mafina called it "one of Tabu Ley's major works". The song celebrated female beauty and was arranged by Maïka Munan. Dino Vangu's solo guitar introduced a stylistic change to the sound established by his predecessors. The song's popularity eventually earned Tabu Ley the nickname "Vieux Maze" ("Old Man Maze"), coined by Djuna Djanana in Bolenge Djo Mali's hit "Bakutu Bis", performed with Langa Langa Stars.

Music historian Gary Stewart notes that Tabu Ley had long welcomed women into his bands, including Photas Myosotis and Henriette "Miss Bora" Bora Uzima. Miss Bora joined Tabu Ley's African Fiesta National in 1966, where he gave her the nickname she became known by. According to the Council for the Development of Social Science Research in Africa, Tabu Ley's 1970 performance at the Olympia Hall marked a period when women who had initially worked as singers began taking more visible roles as dancers. Although the role marginalized women socially, it brought about a significant shift in their visibility in Congolese popular music. Stewart credits Tabu Ley with challenging the male dominance of the Congolese music scene and opening opportunities for women in bands. Music historian Graeme Ewens regarded Mbilia Bel's recruitment in 1981 as a "masterstroke" in Tabu Ley's career. Initially recruited as a member of the Rocherettes' dance troupe, she soon emerged as Afrisa's principal female vocalist, making her debut as a lead singer on several Tabu Ley compositions, including "Mpeve Ya Longo", "Sima Na Ngai," "Lisanga Bambanda", and "Kelhia". In 1983, Tabu Ley also recorded the collaborative albums Choc Choc Choc and L'Événement! with his longtime rival Franco. Choc Choc Choc was supported by the Franco-written hit "Lettre à Mr. Le Directeur Général", which criticized the managers and bureaucrats of Zairean parastatals and was widely interpreted as an indirect criticism of President Mobutu Sese Seko, who appointed them. L'Événement! featured the tribute hit "Kabassele In Memoriam", written by Tabu Ley in honor of Le Grand Kallé. Both albums feature guitar work by Franco and Michelino Mavatiku Visi and saxophone by Zimbabwean-born musician Sax Matalanza.

=== 1984–1996: From the U.S. breakthrough to exile ===
In early 1984, Tabu Ley made his first major attempt to enter the U.S. market with the self-titled greatest-hits album Tabu Ley. Unlike Franco, he partnered with an American record company, licensing six recent Genidia recordings to New Jersey-based Shanachie Records, including his jointly composed hit "Eswi Yo Wapi" with Mbilia Bel. Booking agent Paul Trautman, who had previously brought King Sunny Adé to the U.S., arranged a seventeen-city tour across North America, with four performances in Canada. Orchestre Afrisa International began the tour in Washington, D.C., during the second week of February. The tour drew a substantial audience despite limited promotion caused by the delayed release of Tabu Ley, which was issued later that year. Trautman told Billboard that the concerts were attracting roughly 1,000 people each, while strong ticket demand in Vancouver led to the addition of a second performance. Despite the careful preparation, Tabu Ley "appeared to lack confidence in his music's inherent appeal". He told the Kinshasa press that he had gone to the U.S. to promote the message of authenticité. Western critics, however, were less receptive: Rolling Stone likened his stage presentation as being more reminiscent of Las Vegas, while The Village Voice found it less compelling than King Sunny Adé's. The New York Times singled out the "infectious, purely Zairean dance music" as the strongest part of the show. Stewart pointed out that Tabu Ley had "failed to understand that Western audiences were attracted by what he did best" and he couldn't "resist the compulsion to crossover". The same uncertainty was evident when he returned to Kinshasa. After a large reception from TPOK Jazz representatives, the Afrisa fan club, and a parade through the city's streets, Tabu Ley told reporters that his success in the U.S. had come from performing in the style of Zaïko Langa Langa and Papa Wemba and dancing like Lita Bembo.

Afrisa also performed in London that year and released several albums, including Keyna, which was supported by the Tabu Ley-written hit "Nakei Nairobi" (Lingala for "I am going to Nairobi") and featured Mbilia Bel on lead vocals. The song follows Duni, a childhood friend who had relocated to Nairobi, and Mbilia Bel's character's decision to travel there and bring him back to Kinshasa after learning of the difficulties he faced abroad. Some accounts have suggested that Duni may have been a reference to Tabu Ley himself. "Nakei Nairobi" became a hit in East Africa and, according to Africa Is a Country, President Daniel arap Moi, who had previously banned Congolese music in Kenya, reportedly reconsidered his stance following the song's release. In 1985, Afrisa released several albums, including Haffi Deo "L'Eau De Dieu" and Seigneur Tabu Ley Rochereau, while Tabu Ley released the collaborative albums La Beauté D'Une Femme with Mbilia Bel and Omona Wapi with Franco. Afrisa performed at the WOMAD festival on Mersea Island, Essex, and at the Upper Cut Club in Stratford, London. Music journalist Alastair Johnston recalled that the Upper Cut Club was filled with London's African expatriate community. Tabu Ley and Mbilia Bel later married in the mid-1980s, and their daughter, Mélodie Tabu, was born around this time.

In 1986, Tabu Ley recruited another female vocalist, Thérèse Kishila Ngoyi, known as Faya Tess. That year, Afrisa toured East Africa, performing in Kenya, Tanzania, and Rwanda. The tour culminated in the four-track album Nadina, which included Lingala and Swahili versions of the title song, co-written by Tabu Ley and Panga Kasongo. Following their return to Kinshasa, rumors circulated about a rift between Tabu Ley and Mbilia Bel. Both denied the reports, and Mbilia Bel rejoined him in 1987 for the album Beyanga. Faya Tess's recruitment contributed to tensions within Afrisa during the recording of Contre ma volonté, and Mbilia Bel left the band to pursue a solo career, citing a lack of transparency in management and blurred professional and personal relationships. Following her departure, Tabu Ley left Zaire for Virginia and later to Paris on a temporary visa and remained abroad as political and economic conditions worsened. His departure and subsequent recordings in Paris further strained his relationship with Mobutu. He told the Los Angeles Times that the government believed he had "run away" and summoned him to return, but he refused and was subsequently barred from returning. In 1989, Tabu Ley lived briefly in Los Angeles before moving to New Jersey. However, Tabu Ley moved "from place to place", and other sources also reported that he lived in South Africa and Nairobi. In June 1989, he released Afrisa's album Babeti Soukous, one of four albums that launched Peter Gabriel's Real World Records and among his first recordings after moving into exile in France. Although Babeti Soukous is rooted in soukous and described in its liner notes as "Zairean pop", it incorporates elements of Latin music, jazz, rock, rhythm and blues, and Congolese dance rhythms. The album marked Tabu Ley's shift toward solo rather than ensemble horns and was noted for its vibrancy and experimentation. On 6 October, Tabu Ley and Afrisa performed at Lisner Auditorium with five vocalists and two Rocherettes. He often shared the stage with two protégés, Faya Tess and Beyou Ciel. The Washington Post described Faya Tess' vocals as restrained despite her soukous hip-rotation moves, while praising Beyou Ciel as a "dynamic singer".

Following Franco's death, Tabu Ley was allowed to return to Zaire only once, for a 24-hour visit to attend his funeral, and returned again in 1991 for the funeral of "his former wife". During this period, Tabu Ley was "harshly critical" of Mobutu, whom many blamed for Zaire's worsening poverty and political disorder. Earlier in 1990, the Commission de Censure de la Musique banned Tabu Ley and Afrisa's album Trop, C'est Trop as subversive. Tabu Ley said that returning permanently would be risky: although he did not expect to be harmed or arrested, he feared being prevented from performing and possibly denied medical treatment. He maintained the U.S. as his base for touring and international travel. In 1991, he released the soukous compilation Man from Kinshasa through Shanachie Records, which received an A− from critic Robert Christgau, who praised its catchy tunes, varied rhythms, Cuban horns, musette accordion, and rippling guitar work.

On 30 March 1993, Tabu Ley and Afrisa released Exil-Ley through SonoDisc, featuring the hit single "Le glas a sonné" ("The Bell Has Tolled"), an openly anti-Mobutu song that inspired numerous imitators. The song called on people to stop fearing dictators, openly oppose the regime, and invoke the legacy of Patrice Lumumba and other progressive politicians. "Le glas a sonné" was censored by the Commission de Censure de la Musique.

In 1994, Tabu Ley and Afrisa relocated from New Jersey to Anaheim, California. On 26 June 1994, Tabu Ley and Afrisa performed at Festival of African and Caribbean Arts & Culture (FESTAC) at the Rainbow Lagoon Park in Long Beach. On 24 August, they performed at the Long Beach Museum of Art for the final concert of its summer series. On 6 September, he released the seven-track Rounder Records-produced Muzina, which was distributed in France by SonoDisc and found success in Paris, New Jersey, and Africa. They also performed regularly at clubs, concert halls, and festivals in the U.S. and toured Europe, Africa (except Zaire), and Japan. In 1996, Tabu Ley appeared on Africando's salsa album Gombo Salsa. The album's "Paquita" is a remake of a song he released with African Fiesta in 1964. That year, he released the Rounder Records-produced greatest-hits album Africa Worldwide: 35 Year Anniversary.

=== 1997–2008: Return from exile ===
After Mobutu fell from power in 1997 and the AFDL under Laurent-Désiré Kabila assumed control, Tabu Ley returned to Kinshasa and was appointed a deputy by Kabila. In 2000, he was part of the supergroup Haute Tension, alongside King Kester Emeneya, Werrason, Manda Chante, Bill Clinton Kalonji, and Adricha Tipo-Tipo, with their nine-track album Apocalypse, which was produced by Jacko Sayala through his record label Jacko Production. In 2001, Tabu Ley performed at the Festival Panafricain de Musique (FESPAM), and on 13 April 2002, he appeared at Emeneya's concert at the Olympia Hall. He was also scheduled to perform at the LCS venue in Paris on 30 November alongside Rocherettes, as well as Love-Ley and musicians from the Dynastie band. However, the concert was canceled after the musicians and dancers were unable to obtain visas because of the widespread Ngulu phenomenon, in which officials exploited the visa system by sending non-musicians in place of legitimate artists.

In 2003, Tabu Ley released the 11-track Tempelo after several years without an album, during which he toured extensively in the U.S., Canada, and South America. The album was issued through Next Music and distributed by SonoDisc, incorporating drum machines and synthesizers into its sound. It also marked the recording debut of Tabu Ley's daughter, Mélodie Tabu, who decided to participate after hearing the music and proposing to sing alongside her father. She contributed vocals to the choruses and wrote and performed "Move Around".

He participated in the FESPAM's fifth edition, which was held in Brazzaville from 9-17 July 2005. In July 2008, he represented the DRC at the World Music Festival in Varadero, Cuba.

== Political career ==
When Mobutu was ousted in 1997 and the AFDL, led by Laurent-Désiré Kabila, took control, Tabu Ley returned to Kinshasa and was appointed as a deputy by Kabila. However, during his time in parliament, he was more frequently seen on stage performing and singing songs in praise of Kabila than engaging in legislative work. After Kabila's death in January 2001, Tabu Ley then joined the appointed transitional parliament created by Joseph Kabila. By the end of 2001, reports indicated that he was considering a return to music, though it was suggested that he hadn't officially resigned from politics due to potential complications with party influences, especially from Philomène Omatuku Atshakawo Akatshi, the acting president of his political party, Assemblée constituante et législative – Parlement de Transition (ACL–PT). In 2002, he joined the Congolese Rally for Democracy (RCD), and on 15 November 2005, Tabu Ley was appointed vice-governor of Kinshasa, succeeding Laurent Batumona Nkhandi Kham. The appointment was made by presidential decree and announced on Radio Télévision nationale congolaise (RTNC) as part of a wider political reshuffle ordered by President Joseph Kabila. The Transitional Government continued until the adoption of a new constitution on 18 February 2006 and the general elections in December of that year, which officially ended with the formation of a new cabinet on 5 February 2007. He was then appointed as provincial minister for Youth and Sports and for Culture and Arts in Kinshasa.

Tabu Ley's political career was uneven and lacked strong institutional grounding, and many observers often viewed him as a cultural icon whose shift into politics was incomplete.

== Death ==
Tabu Ley died on 30 November 2013, aged 73, at Cliniques universitaires Saint-Luc in Brussels, where he had been receiving treatment for complications from a stroke suffered in 2008. His remains were repatriated to Kinshasa on 7 December and taken to the Palais du Peuple, where an official mourning ceremony was held in his honor. Relatives, political figures, fellow artists, and members of the public gathered to pay their respects. He was buried on 9 December at the Cimetière Acropolic de la N'sele in Kinshasa.

== Recorded output ==
Tabu Ley is credited with an outstanding body of work. Afropop Worldwide estimates that he was responsible for as "many as 3,000 songs and 250 albums", while AllMusic states that he composed "more than 2,000 songs". His earliest recordings with African Jazz appeared on the Esengo and Surboum African Jazz labels. According to the AfroDisc website, which documents African popular music issued on shellac, vinyl, and CD, Tabu Ley's African Jazz recordings from 1959 to 1963 released through these labels have yet to be fully documented. Between 1962 and 1965, approximately 115 45-rpm vinyl singles featuring African Fiesta were issued on the Vita label. These releases preceded the band's eventual dissolution and division into two groups: African Fiesta Sukisa, led by Nico Kasanda, and African Fiesta "66", which was soon renamed African Fiesta National under Tabu Ley's leadership. Tabu Ley's Vita recordings with African Fiesta, including his work with Nico Kasanda between 1963 and 1965, are documented in the second revised edition of Alastair Johnson's "Docteur Nico Discography".

=== Flash, Vita 1000, and ISA ===
African Fiesta National's 45-rpm vinyl singles were first issued on the Flash label, with the band's initial releases appearing there in 1966. Altogether, Flash issued 50 singles, although four catalogue numbers may never have been used. In 1968, these releases were followed by a new series on the Vita label, which had previously been associated with African Fiesta's recordings from 1963 to 1965. Known as the Vita 1000 series and identifiable through its matrix numbers, the records appeared under both the Vita and Flash labels. The series was licensed by Ngoma, which had by then moved its operations to Paris, and was reissued between 1969 and 1970 using Ngoma catalogue numbers while retaining the Vita 1000 matrix numbers. The first eight tracks in the Vita 1000 series were also reissued as singles on the African label under Flash 300–303 and subsequently appeared on three identical compilation albums: Ngoma J 33 002 P1969, African 360.004 P1969, and SonoDisc SAF 50.004 P1975. Another eight tracks from the Vita 1000 series were reissued as Ngoma singles and included on the identical compilation albums Ngoma J 33 005 P1969 and Sonafric SAF 50.002 P1975. In total, AfroDisc estimated that Ngoma released 25 singles and two compilation albums. The 1969 compilation African 360.009, "Tango ya ba viex Kalle N° 2", also carries the Vita name and identifies the performers as "Le Seigneur Rochereau et l'African Fiesta National"; however, its ten tracks are actually recordings made by the earlier African Fiesta between 1963 and 1965 rather than by the African Fiesta 66/National lineup formed in 1966.

Tabu Ley founded International Service Artistic (ISA) in 1969, establishing both the organization and a record label under that name. The band was subsequently renamed Afrisa, a name derived by combining "African" with "ISA". The ISA label issued a series of original 45-rpm singles in Congo from 1969 through the mid-1980s. Apart from ISA R. 114 and ISA R. 115, both released in 1980, the singles issued during this period and afterward were generally drawn from previously released albums or contained tracks that also appeared on international compilation albums distributed by Afric Music in Paris, Disco Stock in Abidjan, or, beginning in 1983, Genidia, Tabu Ley's newly established album label. The catalogued original ISA singles range from ISA R. 1, issued in 1969, through ISA R. 92 in 1979, with ISA R. 114 and 115 representing additional releases from 1980. Several songs that were reissued in Kenya during the 1970s on the ASL label have not yet been matched to their original Congolese releases. These tracks, along with other titles known to have been issued during the 1970s, are listed separately at the end of the ISA discography because they may correspond to some of the currently unassigned ISA catalogue numbers.

=== African, Édition Ley, ISA I.01, I.02 albums, financial and artistic control ===
Fonior/Decca France's African label reissued a number of singles that had first appeared in the Congolese ISA series, and these releases are generally catalogued under their original ISA numbers. Six singles belonging to the ISA 500 series appear to have been special editions produced specifically for the African label and have therefore been incorporated into the ISA discography, "arranged chronologically" according to their recording dates. The 500 series was short-lived and was soon replaced by the standard Congolese ISA catalogue numbering system. Most of the recordings released through the African label under the ISA 500 designation were also issued separately in the Congolese ISA series. Some later African releases identify ISA as the original label but do not provide a corresponding Congolese catalogue number. Where no matching Congolese ISA issue has been located and only the African re-release can be identified, the recordings are listed according to their African catalogue numbers and arranged by recording year. Édition Ley was another brief-lived label, active around 1972, with two known releases featuring Orchestre Afrisa.

The ISA 500 series issued by the African label contained four tracks drawn from two albums that Tabu Ley released through ISA in 1970 as ISA I.01 and I.02. Together, the albums featured 15 distinct tracks, three of which appeared on both releases, all recorded "in the fall of 1970" before Tabu Ley and African Fiesta National's celebrated December performances at the Olympia Hall in Paris. The albums were distributed by CEDDI, the distribution arm of the Ngoma label, and were probably manufactured at Ngoma's Paris pressing facility, Disco France. At least two of the recordings were also issued as the 45-rpm single ISA IC.5. However, the arrangement with Ngoma apparently broke down after the company suspended operations in 1971. As a result, 13 of the 15 tracks from the ISA albums were reissued that year in a substantially different sequence across two African albums, Seigneur Rochereau à l'Olympia Vol. 1 and Vol. 2 (African 360.028 and 360.029). These albums also incorporated one track from Flash 12 and another from ISA R. 8, while one of the original ISA album tracks appeared on both African releases.

Of the 15 new recordings initially issued across the two ISA albums bearing the "I" prefix, only six were subsequently released as 45-rpm singles, while 13 were transferred to the two African albums alongside material from Flash and ISA singles. AfroDisc noted that this complicated release history may explain some of the challenges Tabu Ley faced while attempting to establish an independent label that could serve both his artistic and financial interests. His efforts took place within a Congolese music industry in which manufacturing and distribution companies such as Ngoma and Fonior/Ecodis/Decca France held considerable influence around 1970 and 1971.

=== Genidia and collaborations ===
Tabu Ley entered into an arrangement with Daniel Cuxac, the director of Abidjan-based Disco Stock, under which albums would be assembled for international release from recordings that had originally appeared as 45-rpm ISA singles in Congo between 1978 and 1982. This arrangement eventually contributed to the transformation of ISA into a new company and record label, Genidia, which became responsible for Tabu Ley and Afrisa's recordings throughout the 1980s, including his work with Mbilia Bel. Genidia also "marked a change in format" of Tabu Ley's new releases, moving away from individual 45-rpm singles toward full-length vinyl albums. Between 1983 and 1993, Genidia issued 29 original albums, including one double album. At the same time, ISA continued releasing singles in Congo containing tracks taken from various Genidia albums. Two additional Genidia singles featured songs from an album produced in connection with President Mobutu's 1984 presidential election campaign in Zaire.

For the East African market, Génidia issued several albums in Kenya containing different selections of recordings, alongside a series of singles carrying GENI catalogue numbers. One notable release was "Baba Moi" on Génidia GENI 006 P1984, the only known original recording in this series. Sung in Kiswahili by Mbilia Bel with Afrisa International, the song was a tribute to Kenyan President Daniel arap Moi. Its musical foundation came from the instrumental track "Nakei Nairobi", which had been released earlier in 1984 on the album Genidia GEN 114.

Apart from Afrisa's 1983 collaboration with Franco and TPOK Jazz, the band also took part in several album projects without Tabu Ley's audible participation. In 1983, Afrisa recorded four tracks with Lemed Janvier of Benin. More notably, the group collaborated in 1992 with Malian singer Amy Koita on an album Nouvelle dimension, which was released on cassette. By the beginning of the 1990s, Tabu Ley had relocated to the United States, bringing the era associated with African Fiesta National and Afrisa to a close. He subsequently recorded several solo albums before returning to Congo in 1997 and entering politics. During the 2000s, his musical career entered another phase when he produced a series of playback music videos based on songs from his earlier hits.

== Personal life ==
Tabu Ley was reported to have fathered more than 65 children with different women. His children include French rapper Youssoupha, singer Mike Tabu (also known as DJ Master Mike), composer Pegguy Tabu, and Mélodie Tabu, his daughter with singer Mbilia Bel. Belgian rapper Shay is his granddaughter.

Tabu Ley was married to Georgette Mowana, known as Tété, with whom he had five children. He later had a relationship with Jeanne Mokomo, who was crowned Miss Zaire in 1969. Although they never married, the couple had six children.

== Selected discography ==
=== African Fiesta ===
Release	Year	Records and details	Ref.
Vita	1964	Side A: "Paquita" (Tabu Ley Rochereau) – Congolese rumba [V 0087]; Side B: "Eso Querida" (Tabu Ley Rochereau) – Congolese rumba [V 0088]	
Éditions Flash	1966	Side A: "Fiesta en Avant" (Tabu Ley Rochereau) – Mambo [Fo11.465]; Side B: "Mwana ya Ramazani" (Tabu Ley Rochereau) – Lingala (Congolese rumba) [Fo11.466]	
Éditions Flash	1966	Side A: "Cinq Ans" (Tabu Ley Rochereau); Side B: "Yo Lokoso" (Tabu Ley Rochereau)	
Éditions Flash	1966	Side A: "Tabou" (Tabu Ley Rochereau) – Lingala (Congolese rumba) [Fo11.469]; Side B: "Guajira" (Tabu Ley Rochereau) – Afro-Cuban (Agosar Cubain) [Fo11.471]	
Éditions Flash	1966	"Mokolo Nako Kufa" – Lingala (Congolese rumba). Placed on Side B of the 45 rpm record catalogued as FL.12.	

=== African Fiesta National ===
Label	Year	Records and details	Ref.
Éditions Flash	1966	Side A: "Maloba na Yo Pata" (Tabu Ley Rochereau) – Lingala (Congolese rumba) [11.470]; Side B: "Lili Mwana ya Quartier" (Tabu Ley Rochereau) – Lingala (Bouché) [11.474]	
Éditions Flash	1966	Side A: "Nganda ya Diallo" (Tabu Ley Rochereau) – Congolese rumba [Fo11.468]; Side B: "Savon Omo" (Tabu Ley Rochereau) – Lingala (Congolese rumba) [Fo11.495]	
Éditions Flash	1966	Side B: "Celina" (Tabu Ley Rochereau) – Lingala (Boléro)	
Éditions Flash	1966	Side A: "Likala ya Moto" (Tabu Ley Rochereau) – Lingala (Bouché) [11.591]; Side B: "Bana ya Lipopo" (Tabu Ley Rochereau) – Lingala (Bouché) [11.592]	
Éditions Flash	1966	Side A: "Zando ya Malonga" (Tabu Ley Rochereau) – Lingala (Congolese rumba); Side B: "Maria Maria" (Tabu Ley Rochereau) – Lingala (Boléro)	
Éditions Flash	1966	Side A: "Peuple Bojuger" (Tabu Ley Rochereau) – Lingala (Congolese rumba) [11.681]; Side B: "Succès Alamule" (Tabu Ley Rochereau) – Lingala (Congolese rumba)	
Éditions Flash	1966	Side A: "Guantanamera" (Tabu Ley Rochereau); Side B: "Mission Officielle" (Tabu Ley Rochereau) – Congolese rumba	
Éditions Flash	1966	"Mokolo Nakokufa" (Tabu Ley Rochereau) – Lingala (Boucher) [11.686]	
Éditions Flash	1966	"Nati Yo Motema" (Tabu Ley Rochereau) – Lingala (Congolese rumba)	
Éditions Flash	1966	Side A: "Garba" (Tabu Ley Rochereau) – Lingala (Congolese rumba); Side B: "Joujou Zena" (Tabu Ley Rochereau) – Lingala (Boléro)	
Éditions Flash	1966	"Mpo Ngai Ndumba" (Tabu Ley Rochereau)	
Éditions Flash	1967	"One Zambia One Nation" (Tabu Ley Rochereau) – Lingala (Congolese rumba)	
Éditions Flash	1967	"Congo Avenir!" (Tabu Ley Rochereau) – Lingala (Congolese rumba) [11.891]	
Éditions Flash	1967	"À la Santé!" (Tabu Ley Rochereau)	
Éditions Flash	1967	Side A: "Laisse-toi Aimer" (Tabu Ley Rochereau) – Lingala (Congolese rumba) [12.135]; Side B: "Rochereau y Sus Ritmos" (Tabu Ley Rochereau) – Agossar; vocals Sam Mangwana [12.146]	
Éditions Flash	1967	"Djibebeke" (Tabu Ley Rochereau) – Lingala (Boucher)	
Éditions Flash	1967	"Amour Fou" (Tabu Ley Rochereau)	
Éditions Flash	1967	Side A: "Carina" (Tabu Ley Rochereau); Side B: "Humanité" (Tabu Ley Rochereau)	
Éditions Flash	1967	Side A: "Anna Mokoy" (Tabu Ley Rochereau) – Lingala (Bouché); Side B: "Lina" (Tabu Ley Rochereau) – Lingala	
Éditions Flash	1967	Side A: "Kasoule" (Tabu Ley Rochereau) – Lingala (Congolese rumba) [12.177]; Side B: "Congo–Rwanda–Burundi" (Tabu Ley Rochereau) – Lingala (Congolese rumba) [12.182]	
Éditions Flash	1967	Side A: "Marie Jéa" (Tabu Ley Rochereau); Side B: "Sophie Elodie" (Tabu Ley Rochereau)	
Éditions Flash	1967	Side A: "Easra" (Tabu Ley Rochereau); Side B: "Maloba ya Muana ya Moto (Germaine)" (Tabu Ley Rochereau)	
Éditions Flash	1967	Side A: "Mwana ya Vangu" (Tabu Ley Rochereau) – Lingala (Congolese rumba) [12.142]; Side B: "Féli ya Mama" (Tabu Ley Rochereau) – Lingala (Bouché) [12.155]	
Éditions Flash	1967	"Sangrejito" (Tabu Ley Rochereau)	
Éditions Flash	1967	"Congo Nouveau Afrique Nouvelle" (Tabu Ley Rochereau), collaborated with Orchestre Negro Succès	
Éditions Flash	1967	"Mwasi Abongi na Libala" (Tabu Ley Rochereau)	
Éditions Flash	1967	Side A: "Monano" (Tabu Ley Rochereau); Side B: "Adieu la Belle" (Arr. Tabu Ley Rochereau)	
Éditions Flash	1967	Side A: "Brava Pachanga" (Tabu Ley Rochereau); Side B: "Lukina" (Tabu Ley Rochereau)	
Éditions Flash	1967	Side A: "Trembla Tiera" (Arr. Tabu Ley Rochereau) – Charanga [12.147]; Side B: "Bina Ringa" (Arr. Tabu Ley Rochereau) – Agosar [12.148]	
Éditions Flash	1967	Side A: "Como Bacalao" (Tabu Ley Rochereau); Side B: "Munca Siempre" (Tabu Ley Rochereau)	
Éditions Flash	1967	"Libala ya Moyeke" (Tabu Ley Rochereau) – Lingala (Congolese rumba) [12.429]	
Éditions Flash	1967	"Joly Elie" (Tabu Ley Rochereau) – Lingala (Congolese rumba) [12.434]	
Éditions Flash	1967	Side A: "Micheline" (Tabu Ley Rochereau); Side B: "Mwamke" (Tabu Ley Rochereau)	
Éditions Flash	1967	Side A: "Club '53'" (Tabu Ley Rochereau); Side B: "Souza" (Tabu Ley Rochereau)	
Éditions Flash	1967	Side A: "Félina" (Tabu Ley Rochereau); Side B: "Johnny Mon Amour" (Tabu Ley Rochereau)	
Éditions Flash	1967	"Connaissance Koyebana" (Tabu Ley Rochereau) [Fo12.598]	
Éditions Flash	1968	"Maloba ya Kolutu" (Tabu Ley Rochereau) – Lingala (Congolese rumba) [12.954]	
Éditions Flash	1968	"Mokitani Ya Wendo" (Tabu Ley Rochereau) – Lingala (Congolese rumba) [ FL 33 005]	
Éditions Flash	1968	"Christine" (Tabu Ley Rochereau) – Lingala (Congolese rumba) [ FL 33 005]	
Éditions Flash	1968	"Marie Clara" (Tabu Ley Rochereau) – Lingala (Congolese rumba) [ FL 33 005]	
Éditions Flash	1968	"Song + Song = Songi Songi" (Tabu Ley Rochereau) – Lingala (Congolese rumba) [ FL 33 005]	
Éditions Flash	1968	Side A: "Peuple" (Tabu Ley Rochereau) – Jobs [12.963]; Side B: "Cadeco" (Tabu Ley Rochereau)	
Éditions Flash	1968	Side A: "Martin Luther King 1" (Tabu Ley Rochereau) – Lingala (Congolese rumba) [12.961]; Side B: "Martin Luther King 2" (Tabu Ley Rochereau) – Lingala (Congolese rumba) [12.962]	
Éditions Flash	1969	Side A: "Mokrano" (Rochereau) – Lingala (Congolese rumba) [V.1000A]; Side B: "Toyota" (Rochereau) – Lingala (Jobs) [V.1000B]	
Éditions Flash	1969	Side A: "Kashama Nkoy" (Rochereau); Side B: "Mon Mari Est Capable" (Rochereau)	
Éditions Flash	1969	Side A: "Gipsy" (Rochereau) – Lingala (Congolese rumba and Jazz); Side B: "Kasala" (Rochereau) – Tshiluba (Congolese rumba)	
Éditions Flash	1969	Side A: "Bel Abidjan" (Rochereau) – French (Congolese rumba); Side B: "Caroline Mama" (Rochereau) – Lingala (Jobs)	
Éditions Flash	1969	Side A: "Izeidi Seyni Kay Fonema" (Sosseh, Johnson & Rochereau) – Senegalese Rumba [V1004A]; Side B: "Los Problas" (Arr. Rochereau) – Pachanga [V1004B]	
Éditions Flash	1969	Side A: "Négra Sanda" (Rochereau) – Charanga [V1007A]; Side B: "Munequita" (Rochereau) – Cha-cha-cha [V1007B]	
Éditions Flash	1969	Side A: "Maurice" (Rochereau) – Lingala (Congolese rumba); Side B: "Avenue Mwana Tabu" (Rochereau) – Lingala (Congolese rumba)	
Éditions Flash	1969	Side A: "Mokitani ya Wendo" (Rochereau); Side B: "Christine" (Rochereau)	
Éditions Flash	1969	Side A: "Marie-Clara" (Rochereau); Side B: "Song + Song = Songisongi" (Rochereau)	
Éditions Flash	1969	Side A: "Ki-Makango mpe Libala" (Tabu Ley Rochereau) – Jobs and soukous [14.113]; Side B: "Zuwa ya Bozenzi" (Tabu Ley Rochereau) – Congolese rumba [14.114]	
Éditions Flash	1969	"Mosolo" (Tabu Ley Rochereau) – Jobs [14.118]	
Éditions Flash	1969	Side A: "Bonane na Noël" (Tabu Ley Rochereau) – Soukous and jobs; Side B: "Nganga ya Maza" (Tabu Ley Rochereau)	
Éditions Flash	1969	"Taxi Bus ya Ford" (Tabu Ley Rochereau)	
Ngoma	–	Rochereau and African Fiesta National: Side A: "Escorte"; Side B: "Mon Mari Est Capable" – Lingala (Jobs)	
Ngoma	–	Rochereau and African Fiesta National: Side A: "Kashama Nkoy"; Side B: "Mentiroso"	
Ngoma	–	Rochereau and African Fiesta National: Side A: "Joséphine Alekaki"; Side B: "Kiss My Nose" (Eleanor Coleman)	
Ngoma	–	Rochereau, Kare René and African Fiesta National: Side A: "Mokitani ya Wendo"; Side B: "Mua Metela wa Tshikuluka"	
Ngoma	–	Rochereau, Pépé Ndombe and African Fiesta National: Side A: "Christine"; Side B: "Nakoti Kotika Yo Te! Papa"	
Ngoma	–	Rochereau, Pépé Ndombe and African Fiesta National: Side A: "Marie-Clara"; Side B: "Hortense"	
Ngoma	–	Rochereau, Pépé Ndombe and African Fiesta National: Side A: "Song + Song = Songisongi"; Side B: "Longo"	
Ngoma	–	Rochereau and African Fiesta National: Side A: "Economat du Peuple"; Side B: "Nasala Boni?"	

=== Orchestre Afrisa International ===
Label	Year	Records and details	Ref.
Éditions Isa	1970	Side A: "Assambalela" (Tabu Ley Rochereau) – Soukous-tétard; Side B: "Fétiche", also titled as "Fétiche d'Afrique" (Tabu Ley Rochereau) – Congolese rumba	
Éditions Isa	1970	Side A: "Moussa" (Tabu Ley Rochereau) – Soukous-tétard; Side B: "Tika Nameka" (Tabu Ley Rochereau)	
Éditions Isa	1970	Side A: "Salongo" (Tabu Ley Rochereau) – Folklore; Side B: "Bavon" (Tabu Ley Rochereau) – Congolese rumba	
Éditions Isa	1971	Side A: "Marthe Maboke" (Mavatiku Visi); Side B: "En Avant KDL"	
Éditions Isa	1971	Side A: "Mundi" (Tabu Ley Rochereau) – Soum [IC8A]; Side B: "Silikani" (Tabu Ley Rochereau) – Soum [IC8B]	
Éditions Isa	1971	"Seli-Ja" (Tabu Ley Rochereau) – Soum [IC9A]	
Éditions Isa	1972	Side A: "Objectif 80" (Tabu Ley Rochereau) – Tétard [IC11A]; Side B: "Maloba ya Moweyi" (Tabu Ley Rochereau) – Soum [IC11B]	
Éditions Isa	1972	Side A: "Objectif 80" (Tabu Ley Rochereau); Side B: "Pitié" (Tabu Ley Rochereau)	
Éditions Isa	1972	"Amitié Sénégalo-Congolaise" (Tabu Ley Rochereau)	
Éditions Isa	1972	"Tobatela Nyama" (Tabu Ley Rochereau) – Soum [IC15A]	
Éditions Isa	1972	"Kinshasa" (Tabu Ley Rochereau)	
Éditions Isa	1972	"Mongali" (Tabu Ley Rochereau) – Authen [4505]	
Éditions Isa	1972	"Mathinda-Mathi" (Tabu Ley Rochereau)	
Éditions Isa	–	"Nabeli Cholera" (Tabu Ley Rochereau) – Soum [3962]	
Éditions Isa	–	"Leki ya Mongali... Tosuki Wapi" (Tabu Ley Rochereau)	
Éditions Isa	1973	Side A: "Sebene 182" (Tabu Ley Rochereau); Side B: "Kiwelewele" (Tabu Ley Rochereau)	
Éditions Isa	1973	Side A: "Tete Nakozonga" (Tabu Ley Rochereau); Side B: "Afrisa L'International" (Tabu Ley Rochereau)	
Éditions Isa	1973	Side A: "Dialogue" (Tabu Ley) [175.0254]; Side B: "Mofuku na Libenga" (Tabu Ley)	
Éditions Isa	1973	Side A: "Marie-Lou" (Tabu Ley); Side B: "Libala to Cinéma" (Tabu Ley)	
Éditions Isa	1973	Side A: "Leki Ya Mongali... Tosuki Wapi?" (Tabu Ley Rochereau) – Congolese rumba [R28]; Side B: "Lala Biy" (Lennon-McCartney) – Congolese rumba [R28]	
Éditions Isa	1973	"Au Dessus des Moyens" (Tabu Ley) [FOL19.882]	
Éditions Isa	1973	"Aon-Aon" (Tabu Ley) [FOL19.884]	
Éditions Isa	1973	"Nakoya Kobebisa R." (Tabu Ley) [175.01073]	
Éditions Isa	1973	"Nati Ye Goal" (Tabu Ley) [175.01085]	
Éditions Isa	1973	Side A: "Kaful Mayay 1" – Congolese rumba [R 53]; Side B: "Kaful Mayay 2" – Congolese rumba [R 53]	
Éditions Isa	1973	Side A: "Sambuluma 1" (Tabu Ley) – Soum [175.01083]; Side B: "Sambuluma 2" (Tabu Ley) – Soum [175.01084]	
Éditions Isa	–	"Mimi Ley" (Tabu Ley) [175.1199]	
Éditions Isa	1974	"Melina" (Tabu Ley) [175.1457]	
Éditions Isa	1974	"Omanga" (Tabu Ley) [1874]	
Éditions Isa	1974	"Palmarès" (Tabu Ley) [MZD109]	
Éditions Isa	1974	Side A: "Kaful Mayay 1" (Tabu Ley) [175.1982]; Side B: "Kaful Mayay 2" (Tabu Ley)	
Éditions Isa	–	"Sombele" (Tabu Ley) [175.1653]	
Éditions Isa	–	Side A: "Nzala" (Tabu Ley); Side B: "Mband Nayei" (Tabu Ley) [175.1657]	
Éditions Isa	–	"Karibou ya Bintou" (Tabu Ley) [175.2136/903]	
Éditions Isa	1975	Side A: "Kinsuka 1" (Tabu Ley) [175.2325 / MZD 1.062]; Side B: "Kinsuka 2" (Tabu Ley) [175.2326 / MZD 1.063]	
Éditions Isa	1975	"Mass Media" (Tabu Ley) [175.2448]	
African	1975	Side A: "Kobota Elengi" (Tabu Ley); Side B: "Confusion" (Tabu Ley)	
African	1975	Side A: "Likambo ya Balobi" (Tabu Ley); Side B: "Ekimana" (Tabu Ley)	
Éditions Isa	1976	"Yombe" (Tabu Ley)	
African	1977	Side A: "Mbelenga 1" (Tabu Ley); Side B: "Mbelenga 2" (Tabu Ley)	
African	1977	Side A: "Sala Lokola Ngai 1" (Tabu Ley); Side B: "Sala Lokola Ngai 2" (Tabu Ley)	
Éditions Isa	1977	Side A: "Yombe 1" (Tabu Ley) [1702F/A]; Side B: "Yombe 2" (Tabu Ley)	
Éditions Isa	1977	Side A: "Adeito 1" (Tabu Ley) [176.258]; Side B: "Adeito 2" (Tabu Ley)	
Éditions Isa	1977	Side A: "Tosa Mpia" (Tabu Ley); Side B: "Amando" (Jossart N'Yoka Longo)	
Éditions Isa	1977	Side A: "Likambo ya Mokanda 1" (Tabu Ley); Side B: "Likambo ya Mokanda 2" (Tabu Ley)	
Éditions Isa	1977	Side A: "Poto Galo 1" (Tabu Ley); Side B: "Poto Galo 2" (Tabu Ley)	
Éditions Isa	–	"Karibou ya Bintou" (Tabu Ley)	
Éditions Isa	1978	Side A: "Ponce Pilate 1" (Tabu Ley); Side B: "Ponce Pilate 2" (Tabu Ley)	
Éditions Isa	1978	Side A: "Nakoka 1" (Tabu Ley); Side B: "Nakoka 2" (Tabu Ley)	
Éditions Isa	1978	Side A: "Sorozo 1" (Tabu Ley); Side B: "Sorozo 2" (Tabu Ley)	
Éditions Isa	1978	Side A: "Mela 1 (Tabu Ley)"; Side B: "Mela 2" (Tabu Ley)	
Éditions Isa	1978	Side A: "Mbote ya Kinvwanga 1" (Tabu Ley); Side B: "Mbote ya Kinvwanga 2" (Tabu Ley)	
Éditions Isa	1978	Side A: "Liaso 1" (Tabu Ley); Side B: "Liaso 2" (Tabu Ley)	
Éditions Isa	1978	Side A: "Mère Ando 1" (Tabu Ley); Side B: "Mère Ando 2" (Tabu Ley)	
Éditions Isa	1979	Side A: "Nayeba Mbanda 1" (Tabu Ley); Side B: "Nayeba Mbanda 2" (Tabu Ley)	
Éditions Isa	1979	Side A: "Bwale 1" (Tabu Ley); Side B: "Bwale 2" (Tabu Ley)	
Éditions Isa	1979	Side A: "Pika Pende 1" (Tabu Ley); Side B: "Pika Pende 2" (Tabu Ley)	
Éditions Isa	1980	"Maindo Musa" (Tabu Ley)	
Genidia	1982	L'Explosive (album)	
Genidia	1982	Rochereau Vol. 4 (album)	
Genidia	1982	Rochereau Vol. 5 (album)	
Genidia	1982	Rochereau Vol. 6 Special An 82 (album)	
Genidia	1982	En Amour Y A Pas De Calcul (album)	
Genidia	1982	Jalousie Mal Placée (album)	
Genidia	1982	Mpeve Ya Longo (album)	
Genidia	1983	Faux Pas (album)	
Genidia	1983	Loyenghe (album)	
Genidia	1983	Femme D'Autrui (album)	
Genidia	1984	Mobutu Peuple Ba Vote Yo Massivement (album)	
Genidia	1984	Ba Gerants Ya Mabala (album)	
Genidia	1984	Keyna (album)	
Genidia	1984	Chante Sarah (album)	
Genidia	1984	Yola (album)	
Genidia	1985	Haffi Deo "L'Eau De Dieu" (album)	
Genidia	1985	Seigneur Tabu Ley Rochereau (album)	
Genidia	1986	Nadina (album)	
Genidia	1987	Contre Ma Volonté (album)	
Genidia	1987	Camarade O (album)	
Genidia	1989	C'est Comme Ça La Vie (album)	
Real World Records	1989	Babeti Soukous (album)	
Editions Kaluila	1990	Trop C'est Trop (album)	
Rounder Records	1994	Muzina (album)	
Espace Culturel Glenn	2001	Linda Soleil (album)	

=== Solo albums ===
- Maze (1981)
- Rythme Soum Gueye (1980)
- Tanga Tanga (1981)
- Linda Soleil (1981)
- Kele Bibi (1983)
- Tabu Ley Rochereau (1985)
- Sacramento Avec Canta Nyboma (1986)
- Tour Eiffel 100 Ans (1989)
- Soum-Djoum (1989)
- Face A Face (1991)
- Exil-Ley (1993)
- Kebo Beat (1997)
- Tempelo (2002)

=== Collaborative albums ===
- L'Événement! (1983, with Franco)
- Choc Choc Choc (1983, with Franco)
- Omona Wapi (1985, with Franco)
- La Beauté D'Une Femme (1985, with Mbilia Bel)
- Grand Seigneur Tabu Ley Presente Mbilia Bel (1986, with Mbilia Bel)
- Lisanga Ya "Banganga" (1992, with Pépé Kallé)

=== Compilation albums ===
- Man from Kinshasa (1991)
- Tabu Ley (1994)
- Africa Worldwide - 35th Anniversary (1996)

=== Contributing artist ===
- The Rough Guide to Congo Gold (2008, World Music Network)
- Congo Funk! (2024, Analog Africa)

== Awards and honors ==
- Honorary Knight (Senegal)
- Officer of the National Order (Chad)
- Gold Medal for Civic Merit (Democratic Republic of the Congo)
- Gold Medal for Arts, Sciences and Letters (Democratic Republic of the Congo)
