= Iyenga =

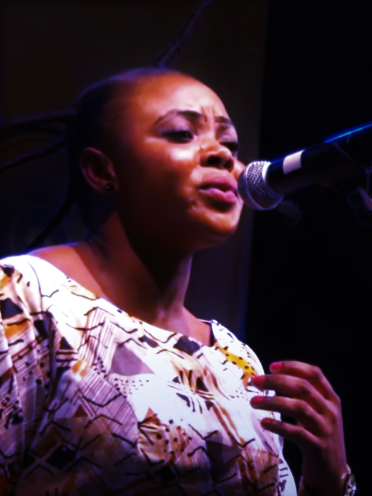
- Iyenga during her 2018 performance at the Jazz Kif Festival in Kinshasa.

Background information
- Born: Equateur, DR Congo
- Genres: Congolese rumba
- Occupation: Singer-songwriter
- Years active: 2012–present
- Labels: Sabab
- Website: iyenga.com

Esther Iyenga Mboyo, better known as Iyenga (born in Equateur, Democratic Republic of Congo) is a Congolese singer-songwriter.

She was spotted by producer Zola Tempo, who integrated her into his label Sabab Music, where she published her first album, "Lonkaya", in 2018. After the album's release, Iyenga received an AFRIMA nomination of the Best Female Artist in Central Africa. She was also a finalist at the 2018 edition of the Prix découvertes RFI.

She has collaborated with Kassav' and Zaïko Langa Langa, considered to be the greatest Afro-Caribbean groups, but also Lutumba Simaro, M'bilia Bel and Ferré Gola.

== Early life ==
Iyenga was born in Equateur province, located in the northwest of the Democratic Republic of Congo.

At a young age, she moved to Kinshasa with her father, who later died.

== Musical career ==
Mboyo started singing in a church choir until 2012, when during a festival she was spotted by producer Zola Tempo, known for his work alongside Zaïko Langa Langa, Jean Goubald and Viva La Musica.

Iyenga collaborated in 2017 with the French musician Aldebert in the track "Joli Zoo".

She also sings with Jocelyne Béroard and Jacob Desvarieux of the group Kassav' and sings as a backing vocalist in the album Sève of the group Zaïko Langa Langa.

After many headlining concerts and festival performances, in 2018, she released her first album titled "Lonkaya".

== Discography ==
=== Studio albums ===
- Lonkaya (2018)
