= Omona Wapi =

Studio album by Franco and Tabu Ley Rochereau
- Released: 1985
- Genre: Congolese rumba
- Length: 33:16
- Label: Shanachie Records

Omona Wapi is an album by Congolese singer-songwriters and bandleaders Franco (Francois Luambo Makiadi) and Tabu Ley Rochereau. Both artists competed for popularity in Africa in the latter half of the 20th century as they contributed to the development of Congolese rumba. Though typically considered to be archrivals, the duo recorded several albums together. Omona Wapi was released by the independent American label Shanachie Records in 1985 and reissued on CD in 1991. It was one of the final recordings of Franco, who released some 150 albums during his career and died of AIDS in 1989.

== Critical reception ==
Professional ratings
Review scores
Source	Rating
AllMusic	4.5/5 stars
Robert Christgau	A+

Omona Wapi was largely ignored in the United States upon release. The Village Voice critic Robert Christgau gave the album an A+ and named it his number one album of 1985. In 1990 he named it the fifth-best album of the 1980s.

== Track listing ==
No.	Title	Length
1.	"Lisanga Ya Ba Nganga"	8:11
2.	"Ngungi"	8:17
3.	"Omona Wapi"	8:03
4.	"Kabassele in Memoriam"	8:45
Total length:		33:16
