= Madiaba =

Madiaba was a dance craze of the Democratic Republic of the Congo that occurred in the 1980s.
