= Judith Pinedo Flórez =

Colombian lawyer and politician

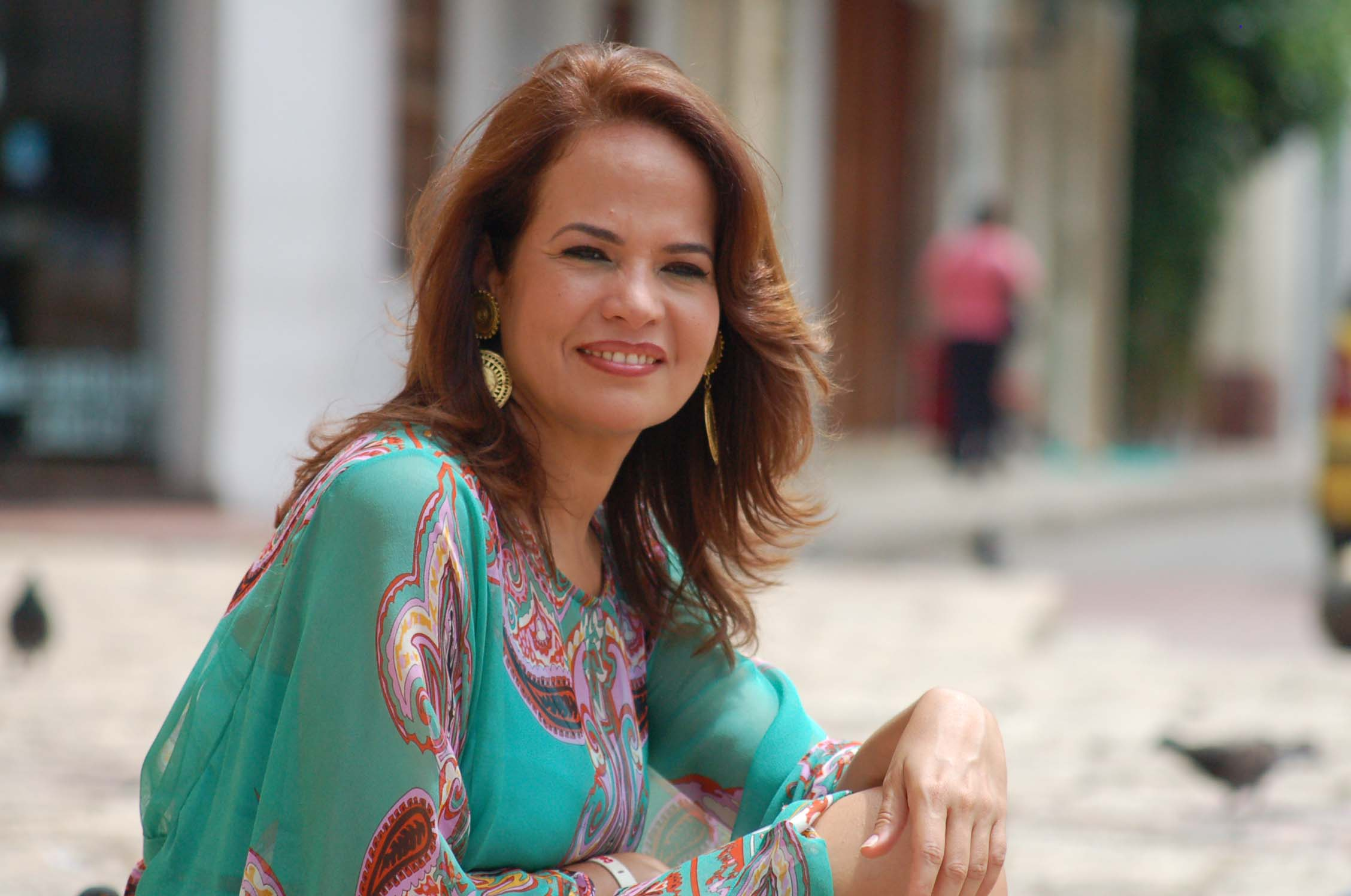
- Image of Judith Pinedo Flórez

Mayor of Cartagena de Indias
- In office 2008–2011

Judith Pinedo Flórez, also known as "Mariamulata", is a Colombian lawyer and politician born in the city of Cartagena de Indias; she was elected mayor of that city for the period 2008 to 2011. Her rival was Juan Carlos Gossain who was considered as a continuator of the policies of Mayor Nicolás Curi, who had been involved in several corruption scandals. She became the first woman to be popularly elected in her city as mayor, where, in addition, never before had an independent politician been able to win the first position.

She was charged in 2011 for embezzlement, after selling city-owned beach land to a developer, under the mistaken belief that it was vacant land. Pinedo Flores was convicted at trial in 2021, but was acquitted by the Supreme Court of Colombia, in 2023.
