= Manu Lima =

Cape Verdean author, composer, interpreter and musician

Manu Lima is a Senegalese-born Cape Verdean author, composer, interpreter and musician, he sings cabo-zouk, funaná, cabo love, cola-dance, afrozouk and kizomba music genres.

He was born in Dakar, Senegal. He was a member of a Capeverdean music group titled Cabo Verde Show.

He also the creator of the music genre AFROZOUK. He produced three albums for Gabonese Zouk musician, Oliver N'Goma.

Manu Lima currently resides in Europe.

== Discography ==
With the Cabo Verde Show

- Bêju cu Jêtu - originally by René Cabral
- Bo Ca Tem Mas
- Bo Ca Sabe
- P.A.I.
- Joana
- Mansinha
- Casa Ma Um Criola
- Criol Inganadu
- Tetesha

With Oliver N'Goma

- Bane (1990)
- Adia (1995)
- Saga (2006)

== See also ==
- Music of Cape Verde
