= Simon-Pierre Boka =

Congolese composer (1929–2006)

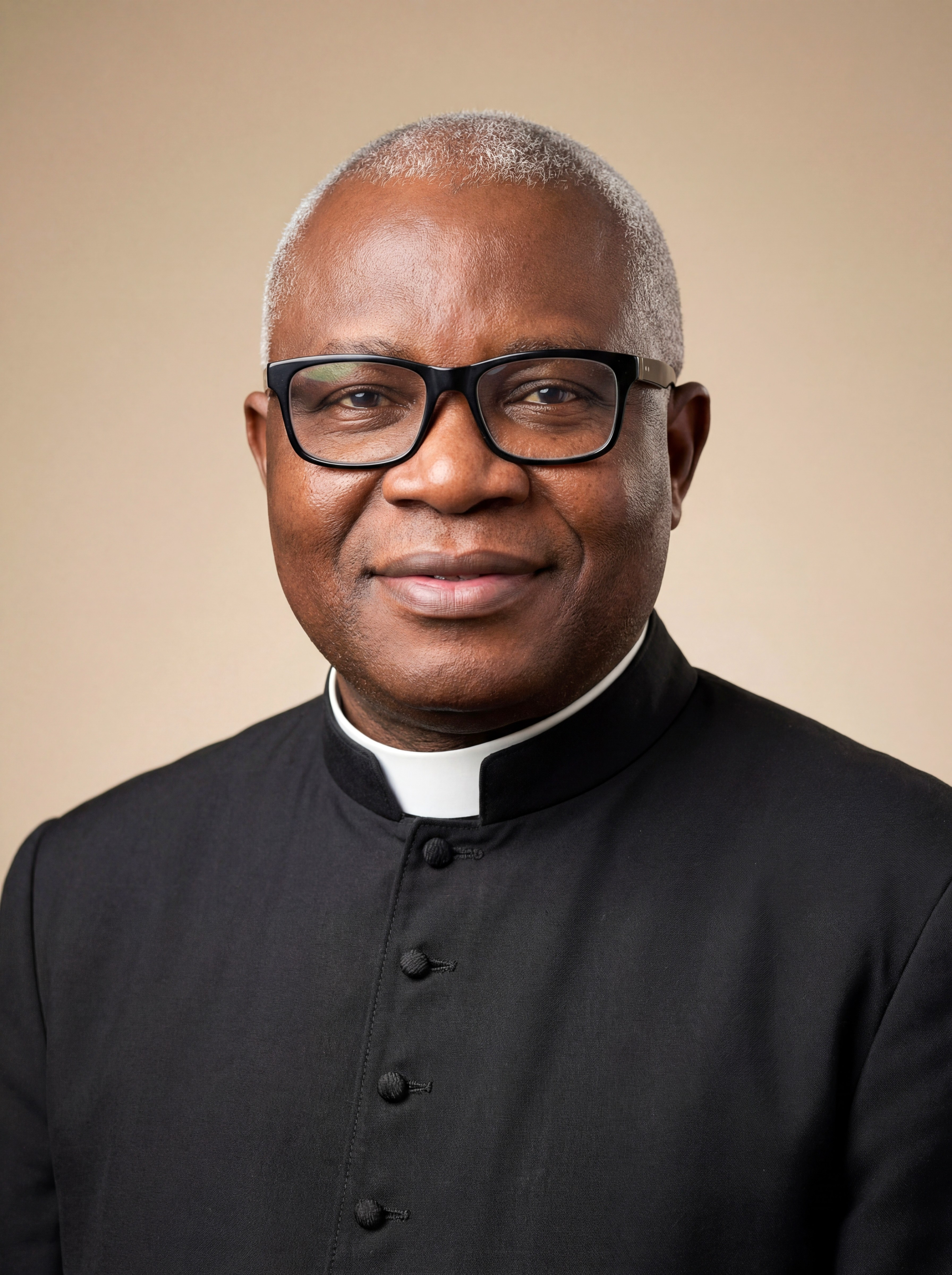
- Born: Simon-Pierre Boka Di Mpasi Londi; September 20, 1929
- Died: September 7, 2006 (aged 76); Abidjan, Ivory Coast
- Resting place: Kongo-Central, Democratic Republic of the Congo
- Citizenship: Democratic Republic of the Congo
- Known for: Composing the national anthem of Zaire

Simon-Pierre Boka Di Mpasi Londi (September 20, 1929 – September 7, 2006) was a Congolese composer and Jesuit father. He composed the National Anthem of the Democratic Republic of the Congo.

== Biography ==
Simon-Pierre Boka Di Mpasi Londi was born on September 20, 1929. During his studies in Rome in 1960, he was called back to Zaire. He then created the National anthem for Zaire. He later also composed the National Anthem of the Democratic Republic of the Congo.

He then ordained at Louvain, Belgium in August 1962. He moved to Abidjan, Ivory Coast in 2002, where he died in September 2006. He was 76. Londi was later buried in Kongo-Central.
