= La Zaïroise =

National anthem of Zaire

English: The Zairian
- National anthem of Zaire
- Lyrics: Joseph Lutumba
- Music: Simon-Pierre Boka Di Mpasi Londi
- Adopted: 27 October 1971
- Relinquished: 17 May 1997
- Succeeded by: "Debout Congolais"

Audio sample
- U.S. Navy Band instrumental version: file; help

"La Zaïroise" (French: [la zaiʁwaz]; lit. 'The Zairian') was the national anthem of Zaire, from 1971 to 1997. The lyrics were written by Joseph Lutumba, and the music was composed by Simon-Pierre Boka, the same person who wrote Debout Congolais.

== Lyrics ==
=== Official lyrics ===
French original

Zaïrois dans la paix retrouvée,
Peuple uni, nous sommes Zaïrois
En avant fier et plein de dignité
Peuple grand, peuple libre à jamais

Tricolore, enflamme nous du feu sacré
Pour bâtir notre pays toujours plus beau
𝄆 Autour d'un fleuve Majesté 𝄇

Tricolore au vent, ravive l'idéal
Qui nous relie aux aïeux, à nos enfants
𝄆 Paix, justice et travail. 𝄇

English translation

Zairians, in the newfound peace,
United people, we are Zairians;
Moving forward, proud and dignified.
Great people, free people forever.

Tricoloured flag, light in us the sacred flame,
In order to always build a beautiful country,
𝄆 Around the majestic river. 𝄇

Tricoloured flag in the wind, revive the ideal,
Which links us to our ancestors and our children,
𝄆 Peace, justice, and labour. 𝄇

=== In local languages ===
Kikongo lyrics

Beto besi Nzadi, tu vutukidi mu luvuvamu,
Nkangu wa simbana, tu besi Nzadi
Ku ntuala, ye lendo yo luzitu
Nkangu wabidi, nkangu muna kimpwanza kia mvu ke mvu

Se bitatu, ututula tiya tua n'longo
Mu tunga nsi ya ntoko vioka mu nsungi ya luta
𝄆 Muna ziunga kia nzadi ya nene 𝄇

Se bitatu mu tembua, i tu vutudi mu ngindu za biza
Zi tu bundakese ye bankaka yo bana beto
𝄆 Luvuvamu, un'songi, ye salu. 𝄇

Lingala lyrics

Bǎna mbóka Zaïre na kímyá tozalí
Na lisangá lya bǎna mbóka, tozali bǎna mbóka Zaïre
Na libóso, lolέndɔ mpé totónda na limεmya
Bingambé bato, bato ba nsɔ́mi ya libélá

Mikóbo mísáto, pelisa bísó na mɔ̂tɔ mwa lotómo
Mpɔ̂ totónga ekólo na bísó kitɔ́kɔ ntángo ínsɔ
𝄆 Na nzínganzínga ya ebalé monɛnɛ 𝄇

Mikóbo mísáto na mopɛpɛ, lamusa iye isengeli izala
Iye isangisi bísó na bankɔ́kɔ mpé na bǎna ba bísó
𝄆 Bobóto, Bosémbo mpé Mosálá 𝄇

Swahili lyrics

Zairi, kaeni kwa amani,
watu wa Unguja, sisi ni watu wa Zairi
Kusonga mbele, wenye kiburi na wenye heshima.
Wape watu, watu wa bure milele.

Tepezwa bendera, weka taa ndani yetu takatifu,
Ili kila wakati tuijenge nchi nzuri,
Karibu na mto mkubwa; Kuzunguka mto huo mkubwa.

Aliyeyeshwa bendera kwenye upepo, ahuisha bora,
Ambayo inatuunganisha kwa mababu zetu na watoto wetu,
𝄆 Amani, haki, na kazi. 𝄇

Tshiluba lyrics

Bantu ba mu Zaïre badi mu ditalala
Bantu ba mu Zaïre badi mu buobumue
Tuende kumpala ne lutambishi ne bunême
Bantu banene, bantu badi ne budikadidi bua kashidi

Mbande wa makole asatu, tujula munda muetu kapia ka tshijila,
Bua kuibaka ditunga dimpe misangu yonso,
𝄆 Pa musulu wa dikema. 𝄇

Tshimfuanyi tshia mabala asatu mu lupepele, tshipetulula lungenyi luimpe
Tshidi tshitutangila kudi bankambua betu, kudi bana betu
𝄆 Ditalala, buakane ne mudimu. 𝄇

== Modern usage ==
La Zaïroise being sung by protestors in the DRC.

Zaire's national anthem has been used by the National Congress for the Defence of the People, a Congolese militia, and has been used during protests against Félix Tshisekedi in 2020, mostly by Mobutists.

The self-proclaimed, New Zaire Government in Exile, which tried to overthrow the Congolese government in May 2024, uses the national flag and anthem of Zaire.

The Republic of Molossia, a self-declared micronation in the United States of America, uses the melody of La Zaïroise in its own national anthem, Fair Molossia Is Our Home.

== See also ==
- "Debout Congolais", the current national anthem of the Democratic Republic of the Congo
