= Bagata, Kwilu =

Bagata
- Location in the Democratic Republic of the Congo
- Coordinates: 3.728083°S 17.953205°E
- Country: Democratic Republic of the Congo
- Province: Kwilu Province
- Territory: Bagata Territory
- Elevation: 902 ft (275 m)
- Time zone: UTC+1 (Kinshasa Time)
- Climate: Aw
- National language: Kikongo

Bagata is a town in the Kwilu Province of the Democratic Republic of the Congo. It is the administrative headquarters of Bagata Territory, and is situated on the Kwilu River between Kikwit and Bandundu.

== Notable citizens ==
Tabu Ley Rochereau, a musician and later politician once dubbed the "African Elvis", was born in Bagata.
