= Bagata Territory =

- Interactive map of Bagata Territory
- Coordinates: 3.728083°S 17.953205°E
- Country: Democratic Republic of the Congo
- Province: Kwilu Province

Area
  - Total: 7,019 sq mi (18,179 km^{2})
- Elevation: 902 ft (275 m)
- Time zone: UTC+1 (Kinshasa Time)
- National language: Kikongo

Bagata Territory is an administrative region in the Kwilu Province of the Democratic Republic of the Congo. The headquarters are in the town of Bagata. The territory is divided into five sectors: Kidzweme, Kwango-Kasai, Kwilu-Ntobere, Manzasay and Wamba-Fatunda.

The Kasai River flows along the northern boundary of the territory. The Kwilu River crosses the territory, flowing in a northwesterly direction past the town of Bagata towards the city of Bandundu, where it joins the Kwango River shortly before that stream enters the Kasai.
