= Joseph Lutumba =

Congolese musician, author of the national anthem

Joseph Lutumba is a Congolese lyricist and the author of the Congolese national anthem. When the Democratic Republic of the Congo was renamed to the Republic of Zaire, he was also the one who composed the new national anthem known as La Zaïroise. La Zaïroise was eventually replaced when the country was renamed back to the Democratic Republic of the Congo by the original national anthem "Debout Congolais".
