= Paris (disambiguation) =

Paris is the capital of France, which may consist of:

- Greater Paris, administratively named Métropole du Grand Paris
- The Paris region, administratively named Île-de-France region

Paris may also refer to:

== People ==
- Paris (surname), a list of people and fictional characters
- Paris (given name), a list of people and fictional characters
- Count of Paris, a title for the local magnate of the district around Paris in Carolingian times; revived in the 19th and 20th centuries by Orléanists

== Mythological or fictional characters ==
- Paris (mythology), a prince of Troy in Greek mythology
- Count Paris, a character in Shakespeare's play Romeo and Juliet
- The Great Paris, stage name of a fictional character on the television series Mission: Impossible

== Places ==
=== Canada ===
- Paris, Ontario, a community
- Paris, Yukon, a former community

=== Indonesia ===
- Paris, Gorontalo, a village in Gorontalo Regency
- Paris, Highland Papua, a village in Highland Papua

=== United States ===
- Paris, Arkansas, a city
- Paris, Idaho, a city
- Paris, Illinois, a city
- Paris, Indiana, an unincorporated community
- Paris, Iowa, an unincorporated community
- Paris, Kansas (disambiguation), two ghost towns
- Paris, Kentucky, a city
- Paris, Maine, a town
- Paris, Michigan, an unincorporated community and CDP
- Paris, Mississippi, an unincorporated community
- Paris, Missouri, a city
- Paris, New Hampshire, an unincorporated community
- Paris, New York, a town
- Paris, Portage County, Ohio, an unincorporated community
- Paris, Stark County, Ohio, an unincorporated community
- Paris, Oregon, an unincorporated community
- Paris, Pennsylvania, a census-designated place
- Paris, Tennessee, a city
- Paris, Texas, a city
- Paris, Virginia, an unincorporated community
- Paris, Wisconsin (disambiguation), several Wisconsin localities
- Paris Township (disambiguation), several US localities
- Beresford, South Dakota, a city formerly called Paris
- Loraine, California, an unincorporated community formerly called Paris
- Paris Mountain, South Carolina; see Paris Mountain State Park
- Paris Mountain, a peak in Virginia
- St. Paris, Ohio, a village

=== Panama ===
- París, Herrera, a corregimiento or subdistrict

=== Other places ===
- Paris, Denmark, a hamlet in Jutland
- Paris, Kiribati, an abandoned settlement on Kiritimati Island in Kiribati
- París, Lajas, Puerto Rico, a barrio
- Paris Basin, a geological region of France
- Paris Peak, Anvers Island, Antarctica
- 3317 Paris, a minor planet named after the legendary figure of the Trojan War

== Arts, entertainment and media ==
=== Film and television ===
- Paris (1924 film), a French silent drama film directed by René Hervil
- Paris (1926 film), an MGM film starring Charles Ray, Joan Crawford, and Douglas Gilmore
- Paris (1929 film), a "lost" production of the 1928 Cole Porter Broadway musical
- Paris (1937 film), a French comedy film
- Paris (2003 film), an American thriller film
- Paris (2008 film), directed by Cédric Klapisch
- Paris (1979 TV series), starring James Earl Jones
- Paris (1994 TV series), a British sitcom
- Paris, fictional setting for Peter Weir's 1974 film The Cars That Ate Paris
- Paris, France (film), a 1994 Canadian comedy-drama directed by Jerry Ciccoritti
- Paris, Texas (film), a 1984 drama directed by Wim Wenders
- "Paris" (The Apprentice), a 2011 television episode

=== Music ===
==== Artists ====
- Paris (band), American rock music power trio formed in 1975
- Paris (rapper) (born 1967), Oakland black nationalist rap artist
- PVRIS, American rock band previously called Paris
- Paris, an early name of Poison, a glam metal band formed in the 1980s
- Paris, an early 1980s British band featuring Andy Hill

==== Musicals ====
- Paris (1928 musical), a Cole Porter musical
- Paris (2003 musical), written by Australian rock musician Jon English

==== Albums ====
- Paris (Marc Lavoine album), a 1991 album by Marc Lavoine
- Paris (Malcolm McLaren album), a 1997 concept album by Malcolm McLaren
- Paris (La Oreja de Van Gogh album), 2004
- Paris (Paris album), 1976
- Paris (Paris Hilton album), Paris Hilton's debut album
- Paris (Putumayo album), a 2006 world music compilation album
- Paris (Supertramp album), a 1980 double-disc live album by Supertramp
- Paris (The Cure album), a 1993 live album by The Cure
- Paris (Zaz album), a 2014 album by Zaz
- Paris, Texas, a 1984 soundtrack album, for the film of the same name, by Ry Cooder

==== Songs ====
- "Paris" (The Chainsmokers song), 2017
- "Paris" (Friendly Fires song), 2008
- "Paris" (Sabrina Carpenter song), 2018
- "Paris" (Suicideboys song), 2015
- "Paris", by The 1975 from I Like It When You Sleep, for You Are So Beautiful yet So Unaware of It, 2016
- "Paris", by Black Atlass, 2013
- "Paris", by Dido from Life for Rent, 2003
- "Paris", by Groove Armada from Soundboy Rock, 2007
- "Paris", by Ingratax, 2021
- "Paris", by Junior H from $ad Boyz 4 Life II, 2023
- "Paris", by Kate Nash from My Best Friend Is You, 2010
- "Paris", by Kungs, 2019
- "París", by La Oreja de Van Gogh from El viaje de Copperpot, 2000
- "Paris", by Magic Man from Before the Waves, 2014
- "Paris", by Moondog from Sax Pax for a Sax, 1997
- "P A R I S", by BT from Emotional Technology, 2003
- "Paris", by Taylor Swift from Midnights, 2022
- "Paris (Who Taught You)", by Jeremih from Late Nights: Europe, 2016
- "Paris", lyrics by E. Ray Goetz, music by Louis Alter, from Paris (1928 musical) and Paris (1929 film), 1928

=== Literature ===
- Paris (Rutherfurd novel), historical novel by Edward Rutherfurd, first published in 2013
- Paris (Zola novel), 1898, by Émile Zola
- Paris: A Poem, a 1920 modernist poem by Hope Mirrlees
- Paris, BN, lat. 4404, a medieval manuscript

== Science and technology ==
- Paris (plant), a genus of plants
- Parkin-interacting substrate (PARIS), aka ZNF746, a protein/gene involved in Parkinson's disease
- Paris Group of French nuclear scientists 1939–40; see Tube Alloys
- Paper Aircraft Released Into Space, aviation project
- .paris, an Internet top-level domain for the city of Paris, France
- Paris, a variant of the AMD Sempron computer processor
- Paris biota, a diverse, Early Triassic aged fossil assemblage discovered in Paris Canyon, Idaho

== Ships ==
- French battleship Paris, launched in 1912 and scrapped in 1956
- SS Paris, various steamships
- SS Paris II, a French military ship sunk in 1917 off Kemer, Turkey

== Other uses ==
- Paris (horse) (foaled 1803), a British thoroughbred racehorse
- París (retail store), a Chilean department store chain formerly known as Almacenes París
- Paris FC, a French football club
- Paris Las Vegas, a hotel and casino
- Morane-Saulnier MS.760 Paris, a French jet trainer and liaison aircraft
- París (Mexico City Metrobús), a BRT station in Mexico City

== See also ==
- Pari (disambiguation)
- Parisian (disambiguation)
- Parisii (disambiguation)
- Parris (disambiguation)
- Parizh (lit. Paris), several rural localities in Russia
- Parys (disambiguation)
- Prais (disambiguation)
- Paris Agreement, international agreement on responding to climate change
- Paris Filmes, a Brazilian film distribution and production company
- Judgement of Paris, a Greek myth
- List of Paris meetings, agreements and declarations
