= Paris micropolitan area =

The Paris micropolitan area may refer to:

- The Paris, Texas micropolitan area, United States
- The Paris, Tennessee micropolitan area, United States

== See also ==
- Paris metropolitan area (disambiguation)
- Paris (disambiguation)
