= African Groove =

Studio album by Various Artists
- Released: 22 April 2003
- Genre: World
- Length: 49 minutes
- Label: Putumayo
- Producer: Dan Storper

African Groove is an album released by Putumayo World Music on 22 April 2003. It consists of tracks by various artists, mixing the styles of African dance music with electronica and hip-hop.

Part of the Putumayo Grooves series, African Groove was released after the highly successful albums Arabic Groove, Latin Groove and Asian Groove.

Track	Artist	Country	Length
Saye Mogo Baga	Issa Bagayogo	Mali	5:14
Boroto	Badenya Les Frères Coulibaly	Burkina Faso	4:36
Mokote	Madeka	Ivory Coast	3:48
Kalicom	Julien Jacob	Benin	3:52
Vadzimu	A Peace of Ebony	Zimbabwe	3:52
Uhiki (Pinye's Remix)	Hardstone	Kenya	4:26
Wouyouma	Positive Black Soul	Senegal	3:57
Bouba (Cool)	Dady Mimbo	Cameroon	4:06
The Lagos Communique	Thievery Corporation	United States	3:53
One for Senegal	The Pleb	Italy/Senegal	4:45
Khululuma	African Rhythm Travellers	South Africa	2:55
Mofolo Hall (Akulawa)	Ndumiso	South Africa	3:56
