= Storper =

Storper is a surname. Notable people with the surname include:

- Dan Storper (1951–2025), American record label executive
- Michael Storper (fl. 1975), an economic and urban geographer, academic and author
