= Galo Negro =

Studio album by Sam Mangwana
- Released: 1998
- Label: Putumayo
- Producer: Christian Polloni

Sam Mangwana chronology
No Me Digas No (1995)	Galo Negro (1998)	Sam Mangwana Sings Dino Vangu (2000)

Galo Negro is an album by the Angolan Congolese musician Sam Mangwana, released in 1998. Mangwana deemed his sound "Congolese Rumba." Mangwana supported the album with a North American tour, accompanied by labelmate Ricardo Lemvo.

== Production ==
Recorded in France, the album was produced by Christian Polloni. Mangwana sang in Swahili, Lingala, Kikongo, Portuguese, French, and English. Several songs are about oppression and the effects of colonialism.

"Manjani" is a duet with Murray Head; Mangwana yodels on the song. The title track, about a freedom fighter, was written by Mangwana with his guitar player, Papa Noël Nedule. Dizzy Mandjeku also played guitar on Galo Negro.

== Critical reception ==
Professional ratings
Review scores
Source	Rating
AllMusic	4/5 stars
Robert Christgau	(2-star Honorable Mention)
The Encyclopedia of Popular Music	3/5 stars
MusicHound World: The Essential Album Guide	4.5/5 stars
The Tampa Tribune	3/4 stars

The Chicago Reader wrote: "The gently rolling rhythms come from former Portuguese colonies like Angola and Cape Verde as well as Cuba, the sweet accordion lines from Madagascar, and the lovely lead guitar work from Congo, courtesy of former OK Jazz member Papa Noël Nedule Montswet." The Sun-Sentinel called the album "full of Congolese rhythms and Latin rhythms—from rumba to vallenato." The Los Angeles Sentinel labeled it "groundbreaking," writing that it "blends pan-African pop styles with influences from Portugal, the Caribbean and Latin America."

The Gazette deemed Galo Negro "a delicate, sensuous set highlighted by Mangwana's evocative tenor voice." The Washington Post noted that "the island flavor of Mangwana's music is reinforced by the presence of the great Malagasy accordionist Regis Gizana and by Mangwana's use of Cape Verdean falsetto vocals." The New York Times considered the album "pretty plainly indicative of an African-Cuban (and African-South American, with hints of music from Colombia and Brazil) cross-pollination."

AllMusic wrote that a listener "hears elements of everything from Afro-Cuban salsa and Dominican merengue to Spanish flamenco and Colombian vallenato."

== Track listing ==
No.	Title	Length
1.	"Galo Negro"
2.	"Manjani"
3.	"Ghetto"
4.	"Elima"
5.	"Zengolo"
6.	"Maloba"
7.	"Nakupenda"
8.	"Cara Mabanzo"
9.	"Balobi"
10.	"Ya Mbemba"
