= Paris Township, Ohio =

Paris Township, Ohio may refer to:

- Paris Township, Portage County, Ohio
- Paris Township, Stark County, Ohio
- Paris Township, Union County, Ohio

== See also ==
- Paris Township (disambiguation)
