= Greater Paris =

Greater Paris may refer to:

== Active administrative divisions ==
- Grand Paris, a métropole covering the City of Paris and its nearest surrounding suburbs created in 2016
- Paris and the Petite Couronne (its inner ring of surrounding departments)
- Île-de-France (region), includes an outer ring (Grande Couronne) of surrounding departments
- Paris aire urbaine, metropolitan area, largely overlaps with the Grande Couronne

== Former administrative divisions ==
- Seine (department) (abolished 1968), Paris and adjacent suburbs

== See also ==
- Paris (disambiguation)
