= Mambo Yo Yo =

Studio album by Ricardo Lemvo
- Released: 1998
- Label: Putumayo
- Producer: Niño Jésus Pérez

Ricardo Lemvo chronology
Tata Masamba (1996)	Mambo Yo Yo (1998)	São Salvador (1999)

Mambo Yo Yo is an album by the Congolese musician Ricardo Lemvo, released in 1998. He is credited with his band, Makina Loca. Lemvo supported the album with a North American tour that included shows as part of his label's AfroLatino Nights tour.

== Production ==
The album was produced by Niño Jésus Pérez. Lemvo sang nine of the album's ten songs in Spanish; he was influenced primarily by Cuban music. Wuta Mayi performed on Mambo Yo Yo. "Aquella Bendita Foto" is a son montuno. The title track is built on the sounds of soukous and salsa.

== Critical reception ==
Professional ratings
Review scores
Source	Rating
AllMusic	4/5 stars
Robert Christgau	(1-star Honorable Mention)
The Encyclopedia of Popular Music	3/5 stars
MusicHound World: The Essential Album Guide	4/5 stars

Robert Christgau deemed the album "Californian Afro-salsa." The St. Petersburg Times stated that "Lemvo has created an articulate mix of Latin derivations, along with soukous stylings of his native Congo region." The Boston Herald called Mambo Yo Yo "a potent, danceable [Putumayo] debut by the Congolese singer."

Newsday determined: "Whether it's the band's easygoing syncopations or Lemvo's sweet, sandpapered tenor, what comes across is a gently insistent sound that glides along on Latin clave rhythms." The Sun-Sentinel noted that, "in Makina Loca, listeners will hear elements from Afro-Cuban music and soukous, but also merengue from the Dominican Republic, konpa from Haiti and a little Calypso."

AllMusic wrote that "the music on Mambo Yo Yo can be characterized as mainly Cuban style son montuno with trumpets (sometimes muted, giving that 'tropical moonlight' sound), driving piano, even a tres on many numbers."

== Track listing ==
No.	Title	Length
1.	"Mambo Yo Yo"
2.	"Rinkinkaya"
3.	"Aquella Bendita Foto"
4.	"Él de la Rumba Soy Yo (Afrika Mokili Mobimba)"
5.	"El Aguacero"
6.	"Biloló"
7.	"No Me Engañes Más"
8.	"Mujer Divina"
9.	"Africa, Havana, Paris"
10.	"Manuela"
