= Parizh =

Parizh (Russian: Пари́ж, lit. "Paris") is the name of several rural localities in Russia.

== Modern localities ==
- Parizh, Republic of Bashkortostan, a village in Nizhnekiginsky Selsoviet of Kiginsky District in the Republic of Bashkortostan
- Parizh, Chelyabinsk Oblast, a selo in Parizhsky Selsoviet of Nagaybaksky District in Chelyabinsk Oblast

== Alternative names ==
- Parizh, alternative name of Charyshsky, a settlement in Krasnoshchyokovsky Selsoviet of Krasnoshchyokovsky District in Altai Krai; 51°41′N 82°36′E

== See also ==
- Paris (disambiguation)
