= M'Pongo Love =

Congolese singer (1956–1990)

- Born: Aimee Françoise M'Pongo; 27 August 1956; Boma, Belgian Congo
- Died: 15 January 1990 (aged 33); Kinshasa, Zaire
- Occupations: Singer; songwriter
- Musical career
- Genre: Congolese rumba
- Label: Love's Music

Aimee Françoise M'Pongo Langu (27 August 1956 – 15 January 1990), known professionally as M'Pongo Love, was a Congolese singer and songwriter. First taking up singing in a church choir, she quit her job when she was 19 years old to pursue a career as a vocalist. Beginning with support from other established musicians, M'Pongo eventually began writing her own compositions, often utilising feminist themes.

== Biography ==
=== Early life ===
Aimee Françoise M'Pongo Langu was born on 27 August 1956 in Boma, Belgian Congo, the second daughter in a family of seven children. Her father, Gilbert Pongo, was a soldier, while her mother was the director of a girls' education center. At the age of four M'Pongo contracted polio and was paralysed by a shot of penicillin. She crawled until she was trained to use a prosthesis in 1962, allowing her to walk. As a child, M'Pongo attended a church where her father was a cantor and began singing for the choir.

M'Pongo also sang in her secondary school choir and, when she graduated, she moved to Kinshasa and enrolled in a shorthand typing course. Afterwards she took a job as an executive secretary at a firm. Outside of her regular work she looked for show-business contracts, introducing herself as M'Pongo Love, a nickname her parents had reportedly used for her since her childhood.

=== Musical career ===
In December 1975 when she was 19 years of age, M'Pongo met saxophonist Empompo Loway, who resolved to help her develop a singing career and persuaded her to leave her secretary job. After an initial failure to secure M'Pongo patronage, the two met band manager Ngwango Isionoma, who agreed to supply them with money to start her career. Loway assisted her in forming a band, Tcheke Tcheke Love, and composed her first songs. M'Pongo debuted with the song "Pas possible Maty" and soon thereafter delivered her first concert at the Ciné Palladium in Kinshasa. Throughout 1977 she performed with an additional backing group, Les Ya tupa's (with members such as Ray Lema, Félix Manuaku Waku, and Alfred Nzimbi), singing compositions by Mayaula Mayoni, Simaro Lutumba, and Souzy Kasseya. Her rendition of Mayaula's "Ndaya" became a hit success in Kinshasa, especially among local women.

M'Pongo soon began composing and arranging her own music. In 1980 she ended her professional relationship with Empompo to work independently, subsequently moving to Paris. She later produced music under her own label, "Love's Music". Later in life she contracted cerebral meningitis in Gabon. She was at her home in Binza, Kinshasa, planning to make a career comeback when her condition worsened and in December 1989 she was admitted to a local clinic. Her older brother told the media that she had had a "strong attack", not specifying her illness. She died on 15 January 1990 and was survived by three daughters.

== Style and themes ==
M'Pongo sang in a clear, slightly nasal voice and utilised precise intonations. During her performances she braced herself on the sides of the stage to compensate for her physical disability. Compared to her contemporaries, M'Pongo was the most feminist of all women soukous singers and actively criticised polygamy and the practice of keeping mistresses in her music. In a 1989 interview she explained her feminist views:

I sing about women's problems, I try to give them courage...and I will stop singing when the relations between men and women in Africa become problem free. But what African man doesn't have a mistress? In addition to a hard life, women have a lot to endure. I have a feminist duty to see they fight, that they defend themselves, that they hold their heads high, that they take independent women as examples...We must know how to say what we are, we African women, without fearing all the modernism we need to assimilate.
