= Michel Boyibanda =

Congolese musician (1940–2024)

- Born: Michel Boyibanda; 22 February 1940; Mokouangou, Republic of the Congo
- Died: 9 October 2024 (aged 84) Brazzaville University Hospital, Brazzaville, Republic of the Congo
- Genres: Congo music
- Occupations: composer, vocalist
- Instrument: Vocalist
- Years active: 1958 – 2015
- Formerly of: TPOK Jazz; Bana OK

Michel Boyibanda (22 February 1940 – 9 October 2024) was a Congolese soukous recording artist, composer, and vocalist. He was once a member of the Congolese Rumba band TPOK Jazz, led by François Luambo Makiadi, which dominated the Congolese music scene from the 1950s through the 1980s.

== Biography ==
Boyibanda was born on 22 February 1940 in Mokouangou, in the Republic of the Congo. He was a member of the Negro Band in Brazzaville, before he crossed the Congo River in 1964 to join the TPOK Jazz band in Leopoldville (now Kinshasa) in neighboring Democratic Republic of the Congo. He is also reported to have performed with other groups including Les Trios Freres, Rumbaya, and Cercul Jazz.

== Illness and death ==
In 2015 he suffered the first of three strokes. His health went downhill from there. Following his third stroke, he was admitted to the Brazzaville University Hospital. Boyibanda died there on 9 October 2024, at the age of 84.

== Partial discography ==
- Ata Na Yebi (1966)
- Samba Toko Samba (1966)
- Andu Wa Andura (1971)
- Ba Soucis Na Week-End (1971)
- Osaboté Ngai Jean-Jean (1971)
- Zando Ya Tipo-Tipo (1974)
- Nzete Esololaka Na Moto Te (1975)

== See also ==
- Franco Luambo Makiadi
- Sam Mangwana
- Josky Kiambukuta
- Simaro Lutumba
- Ndombe Opetum
- Youlou Mabiala
- Mose Fan Fan
- Wuta Mayi
- TPOK Jazz
- List of African musicians
