= Gilbert Pongo =

Gilbert-Pierre Pongo
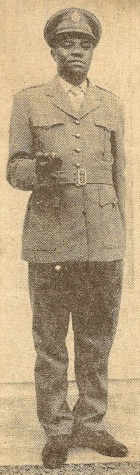
- Born: 22 April 1927; Boma, Belgian Congo
- Died: 20 February 1961 (aged 33); Stanleyville, Free Republic of the Congo
- Cause of death: Execution by firing squad
- Children: Aimée M'Pongo
- Military career
- Allegiance: Congo; DR Congo
- Branch: Sûreté Coloniale; Sûreté Nationale
- Service years: ?–1961
- Rank: Major
- Conflicts: Congo Crisis

Gilbert-Pierre Pongo (22 April 1927 – 20 February 1961) was a Congolese politician and intelligence officer who briefly served as an inspector of the Sûreté Nationale of the fledgling Democratic Republic of the Congo and as a communications liaison. He oversaw the capture of deposed Prime Minister Patrice Lumumba in 1960. His role in the affair led to his execution by Lumumba's supporters in February 1961. He was also known for being the father of Congolese singer M'Pongo Love.

== Biography ==
Gilbert-Pierre Pongo was born on 22 April 1927 to a Bakongo family in Boma, Belgian Congo. His education consisted of six years of primary school, three years of middle school, and one year of vocational school. He later married and had seven children, including future singer Aimée M'Pongo. He was also a cantor at his church and played the harmonica.

Pongo acted as a deputy member of the Parti National du Progrès delegation that attended the Belgo-Congolese Round Table Conference in early 1960. He also served in the Sûreté Coloniale. After a three-month internship in Belgium he was appointed as an inspector of the Sûreté Nationale branch of the interior ministry of the independent Congo in September. During this time he would frequently visit the United Nations Operation in the Congo office in Léopoldville with the declared intention of assassinating Mission Chief Rajeshwar Dayal's military adviser with his sidearm. He also may have sent anonymous death threats to Dayal. Pongo was later promoted to be commandant and finally major. On 15 October Pongo met with the acting government, the College of Commissioners-General, in the capacity of a liaison. On 30 November he assumed the office of Commissioner of Communications.

In November, the deposed prime minister, Patrice Lumumba, attempted to link up with his colleagues in the eastern city of Stanleyville to reestablish his government. Pongo, who deeply despised Lumumba and his supporters, was charged with recovering him. While Lumumba was making his escape over the Sankuru river near Mweka, Pongo's troops captured his wife and youngest child. Unwilling to leave them behind, Lumumba went back and was immediately arrested. He was brought to Pongo at Port-Francqui, who triumphantly escorted him back to the capital. Meanwhile, the rest of Lumumba's colleagues succeeded in creating a "Free Republic of the Congo" and began to consolidate their control in the eastern half of the country. On 1 January 1961 Pongo led an attack on the border-town of Bukavu in an attempt to retake it for the government in the capital but was taken prisoner. He was incarcerated in Stanleyville with a handful of political prisoners where he desperately attempted to gain his freedom by begging his superiors in Léopoldville to release Lumumba. This failed, and on 20 February he was shot alongside 14 others in retaliation for the execution of several Lumumba supporters in South Kasai.
