= Paris (Putumayo album) =

Compilation album by various artists
- Released: April 18, 2006
- Genre: Chanson; Nouveau Scene
- Length: 42:05
- Language: French
- Label: Putumayo World Music
- Producer: Dan Storper

Professional ratings
Review scores
Source	Rating
About.com	4.5/5 stars

Paris is a 2006 compilation of French chanson music by label Putumayo.

== Track listing ==
All tracks are performed by their respective composers, unless indicated otherwise.

1. Au Café de la Paix - 4:03 (Thomas Fersen)
  - From the 1995 album Les Ronds de Carotte. Produced by Warner Music France.
2. Samba de Mon Cœur Qui Bat - 3:52 (Performed by Coralie Clément, written by Benjamin Biolay)
  - From the 2002 album Salle des pas Perdus. Produced by EMI Music France.
3. Dites Moi Tu - 4:42 (Performed by Karpatt, written by Fred Rollat)
  - From the 2002 album A L'Ombre du Ficus. Produced by Productions Speciales.
4. Quelqu'un M'a Dit - 2:43 (Performed by Carla Bruni, written by performer and Lamonde Carax)
  - From the 2002 album Quelqu'un M'a Dit. Produced by Naive Records.
5. Je Reste au Lit - 3:53 (Performed by Pascal Parisot)
  - From the 2000 album Rumba. Produced by Epic Records France.
6. Jardin d'Hiver - 2:56 (Performed by Keren Ann, written by Benjamin Biolay, Keren Ann Zeidel)
  - From the 2000 album La Biographie de Luka Philpsen. Produced by EMI France
7. Serre Moi - 3:46 (Performed by Tryo, written by Christophe Mali)
  - From the 2003 album Grain de Sable. Produced by Yelen Musiques.
8. Lettre A P... - 3:29 (Performed by Paris Combo, written by Belle du Berry and David Lewis)
  - From the 2001 album Attraction. Produced by Universatl France.
9. L'ongle - 2:59 (Performed by Presque Oui, written by Thibaud Defever and Marie-Hélène Picard)
  - From the 2005 album Sauvez les Meubles. Produced by Association Presque Oui.
10. Ta P'tite Flamme - 3:52 (Amélie-Les-Crayons)
  - From the 2005 album Et Pourquoi les Crayons. Produced by Neomme.
11. Les Pages - 2:37 (Performed by Myrtille, written by performer and Vanessa Gillet)
  - From the 2004 album Murmures. Produced by Universal France.
12. Carpe Diem - 3:31 (Guillaume Aldebert)
  - From the 2004 album "L'Année du Singe. Produced by Warner Music France.
