= Empompo Loway =

Empompo "Deyesse" Loway, was a Congolese soukous recording artist, composer and saxophonist. He was a member of the Congolese rumba band TPOK Jazz, led by Franco Luambo, which dominated the Congolese music scene from the 1950s through the 1980s.

== Career ==
He helped Congolese singer M'Pongo Love early in her career by arranging her music and recruiting a wealthy patron to fund her work. He split up with M'Pongo in the mid-1980 and focused on developing another young Congolese singer, Vonga Ndayimba, known professionally as Vonga Aye and a backing band for her known as Elo Music. Early in 1981 he recorded a number of songs in Benin with guitarist Dr Nico Kasanda. When Nico left Tabu Ley's Orchestre Afrisa International in the middle of 1981, Empompo asked Nico to collaborate on some of his projects. Empompo together with Vonga Aye, Nico and 3 other musicians from Elo Music spent a month in Paris recording at the end of 1981. According to Empompo, they recorded enough material for six albums, but only two were released, both under Vonga Aye's name.

In 1983, in Kinshasa, Empompo and his friend from TPOK Jazz, Sam Mangwana, together with singer Ndombe Opertun, who had recently left TPOK Jazz, formed the band Tiers Monde Coopération. The band was reformed a few years later as Tiers Monde Révolution.

He died on 21 January 1990. Ken Braun, head of Sterns Music's in the U.S., described Empompo Loway together with Modero Mekanisi as "the best Congolese saxophonists of the [20th] century".

== See also ==
- Franco Luambo
- Sam Mangwana
- Josky Kiambukuta
- Simaro Lutumba
- Ndombe Opetum
- Youlou Mabiala
- Mose Fan Fan
- Wuta Mayi
- TPOK Jazz
- List of African musicians
