= Putumayo World Music =

American music recording label

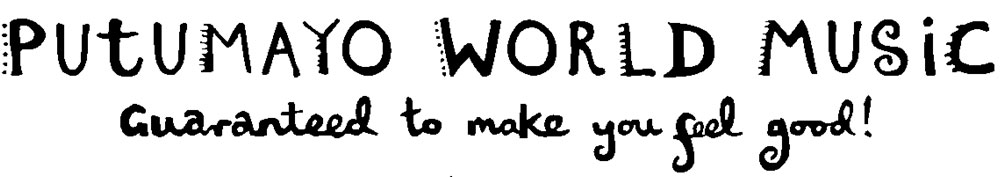
- Founded: 1993
- Founder: Dan Storper
- Genre: World music, jazz & blues
- Country of origin: United States
- Location: New Orleans
- Official website: putumayo.com

Putumayo World Music is a New Orleans-based record label that specializes in compilations of world music, jazz and blues.

== History ==
Dan Storper founded Putumayo in 1975 as a retail store in New York City featuring handicrafts from around the world. Storper took the name of his company, Putumayo, from Colombia's Putumayo River Valley, where he travelled in 1974. Putumayo is said to mean "a heron" and "the place where the river begins" in the local indigenous language. He eventually opened seven world handicraft and clothing boutiques across the northeastern United States.

In 1991, on his way home from Bali, Storper stopped in San Francisco, California. In Golden Gate Park, he heard the Nigerian band Kotoja. He was impressed by the music and started compiling international music to play in his stores. The response from the public was so positive that, in 1993, he launched Putumayo World Music and began offering compilations for sale.

== Artwork ==
Every release features the art of Nicola Heindl. Her art is both folky and modern, and, according to the Putumayo website, "represents one of Putumayo's goals: to connect the traditional to the contemporary."

== Putumayo Presents ==
Typically, a Putumayo World Music compilation is presented under the theme title “Putumayo Presents”. The themes can be regional (South Africa, Caribbean, Asia), music styles (reggae, folk, Latin, jazz) and other themes (lounge, groove, party). All albums in the series from 1993 to the early 2000s were released on both CD and cassette, with Republica Dominicana being the last album released on cassette.

The Putumayo Kids division was created in 2002. Since the release of the World Playground CD in 1999, Putumayo Kids music collections have received over 20 Parents' Choice Awards among other accolades.

Putumayo launched the Putumayo World Music Hour in 2000, a commercially syndicated world music radio show. Rosalie Howarth of KFOG hosts the Music Hour. The weekly show is heard internationally on over 100 commercial and non-commercial stations.

In 2011, Putumayo developed a series of cultural coloring books. Beginning in 2017, it began distributing multicultural books and activity sets in partnership with publisher Barefoot Books. That same year, Putumayo started a series of world greeting card collections that have featured international folk art and photography by illustrator Nicola Heindl, photographer Emerson Matabele, Brazilian block print artist José Francisco Borges, Louisiana Folk Artist William Hemmerling, London artist Christopher Corr and Louisiana painter George Rodrigue.

Putumayo's products are sold at a network of thousands of book, gift, clothing, coffee and other specialty retailers around the world.

Many of Putumayo's music collections are now available for digital download and streaming. In 2020, the company launched an ongoing series of themed streaming playlists.

== Discography ==
- 1993
  - 101/103 The Best of World Music: Volume 1 - World Vocal (April 1993)
  - 102/104 The Best of World Music: Volume 2 - World Instrumental (April 1993)
  - 105/107 The Best of Folk Music: Contemporary Folk (August 1993)
  - 106/108 The Best of World Music: African (August 1993)
- 1994
  - 109/110 Kotoja: The Super Sawalé Collection (July 1994)
  - 111/113 The Best of World Music: Reggae (July 1994)
  - 112/114 The Best of World Music: World Dance Party (July 1994)
  - 115-2 Shelter: The Best of Contemporary Singer-Songwriters (November 1994)
  - 116-2 A Putumayo Christmas (November 1994)
  - 117-2 The Dougie MacLean Collection (November 1994)
- 1995
  - 118-2 The Laura Love Collection (March 1995)
  - 119-2 Women of the World: International (October 1995)
  - 120-2 Women of the World: Celtic (October 1995)
- 1996
  - 121-2 The Touré Kunda Collection (19 March 1996)
  - 122-2 The Dalom Kids and Splash Collection (19 March 1996)
  - 123-2 A World Instrumental Collection (19 March 1996)
  - 124-2 A Touré Kunda, Dalom Kids / Splash and World Instrumental Sampler
  - 125-2 A Celtic Collection (2 July 1996)
  - 126-2 One World (2 July 1996)
  - 127-2 A Johnny Clegg and Juluka Collection (2 July 1996)
  - 128-2 Women's Work (May 1996)
- 1997
  - 129-2 Islands (4 February 1997)
  - 130-2 Travel the World with Putumayo World Music (8 April 1997)
  - 131-2 ¡Latino! ¡Latino! (22 July 1997)
  - 132-2 Caribbean Party (22 July 1997)
  - 133-2 Women of the World: Celtic
  - 134-2 Women of the World: Celtic II (9 September 1997)
  - 135-2 Music From the Coffee Lands (7 October 1997)
- 1998
  - 136-2 Romantica (13 January 1998)
  - 137-2 Women of Spirit (10 March 1998)
  - 138-2 Ricardo Lemvo and Makina Loca: Mambo Yo Yo (19 May 1998)
  - 139-2 Afro ~ Latino (19 May 1998)
  - 140-2 Sam Mangwana: Galo Negro (19 May 1998)
  - 141-2 Celtic Tides (29 September 1998)
  - 142-2 Reggae Around the World (30 June 1998)
  - 143-2 Cairo to Casablanca (25 August 1998)
  - 144-2 A Native American Odyssey: Inuit to Inca (10 November 1998)
- 1999
  - 145-2 Mali to Memphis (26 January 1999)
  - 146-2 Habib Koité & Bamada: Ma Ya (26 January 1999)
  - 147-2 Dublin to Dakar: A Celtic Odyssey (23 February 1999)
  - 148-2 A Mediterranean Odyssey (6 April 1999)
  - 149-2 Cuba (25 May 1999)
  - 150-2 Brasileiro (25 May 1999)
  - 151-2 Africa (13 July 1999)
  - 152-2 Oliver Mtukudzi: Tuku Music (13 July 1999)
  - 153-2 Caribe! Caribe! (22 June 1999)
  - 154-2 World Playground (24 August 1999)
  - 155-2 The Equation: Hazy Daze (28 September 1999)
  - 156-2 Cape Verde (12 October 1999)
  - 157-2 New World Party (9 November 1999)
  - 158-2 Ricardo Lemvo and Makina Loca: Sao Salvador (22 February 2000)
  - 159-2 Italian Musical Odyssey (24 October 2000)
- 2000
  - 160-2 Zydeco (25 January 2000)
  - 161-2 Louisiana Gumbo (25 January 2000)
  - 162-2 Republica Dominicana (22 February 2000)
  - 163-2 South African Legends (25 April 2000)
  - 164-2 Miriam Makeba: Homeland (9 May 2000)
  - 166-2 ¡Mo' Vida! (23 May 2000)
  - 167-2 Puerto Rico (23 May 2000)
  - 168-2 Oliver Mtukudzi: Paivepo (13 June 2000)
  - 169-2 Festa Brasil (27 June 2000)
  - 170-2 Chico César (27 June 2000)
  - 171-2 Rita Ribeiro: Perolas Aos Povos (27 June 2000)
  - 172-2 Latinas: Women of Latin America (25 July 2000)
  - 174-2 Mariana Montalvo: Cantos del Alma (25 July 2000)
  - 176-2 Equation: The Lucky Few (11 July 2000)
  - 180-2 Music from the Tea Lands (22 August 2000)
  - 181-2 A Putumayo World Christmas (26 September 2000)
  - 182-2 A Jewish Odyssey (26 September 2000)
- 2001
  - 183-2 Carnival (9 January 2001)
  - 184-2 Cajun (9 January 2001)
  - 185-2 Gypsy Caravan (13 February 2001)
  - 186-2 Gardens of Eden (13 March 2001)
  - 187-2 Mexico (10 April 2001)
  - 188-2 Jamaica (8 May 2001)
  - 189-2 Arabic Groove (12 June 2001)
  - 190-2 Colombia (10 July 2001)
  - 191-2 African Odyssey (11 September 2001)
  - 192-2 Habib Koité & Bamada: Baro (24 July 2001)
  - 193-2 World Playground II (11 July 2001)
  - 194-2 Music from the Coffee Lands II (9 October 2001)
- 2002
  - 195-2 Samba Bossa Nova (8 January 2002)
  - 196-2 Mississippi Blues (12 February 2002)
  - 197-2 Latin Groove (12 March 2002)
  - 198-2 World Lounge (9 April 2002)
  - 199-2 Oliver Mtukudzi: Vhunze Moto (24 April 2002)
  - 200-2 Congo to Cuba (21 May 2002)
  - 201-2 Latin Playground (11 June 2002)
  - 202-2 Asian Groove (27 August 2002)
  - 203-2 Rumba Flamenco (24 September 2002)
  - 204-2 Afro-Portuguese Odyssey (22 October 2002)
  - 205-2 Calypso (19 November 2002)
- 2003
  - 206-2 Global Soul (14 January 2003)
  - 207-2 African Playground (19 February 2003)
  - 208-2 Cover the World (19 February 2003)
  - 209-2 Euro Lounge (11 March 2003)
  - 210-2 African Groove (22 April 2003)
  - 211-2 French Caribbean (20 May 2003)
  - 212-2 Dreamland (20 May 2003) — reissued in 2022 with 7 songs removed + 3 songs brought in.
  - 213-2 Salsa Around the World (24 June 2003)
  - 214-2 The Oliver Mtukudzi Collection: The Tuku Years (8 July 2003)
  - 215-2 American Blues (26 August 2003)
  - 216-2 Brazilian Groove (9 September 2003)
  - 217-2 The Putumayo World Music 10th Anniversary Collection (21 October 2003)
  - 218-2 Christmas Around the World (7 October 2003)
  - 219-2 French Café (11 November 2003)
- 2004
  - 220-2 Sahara Lounge (20 January 2004)
  - 221-2 World Reggae (24 February 2004)
  - 222-2 Sing Along with Putumayo (23 March 2004)
  - 223-2 Women of Africa (27 April 2004)
  - 224-2 Nuevo Latino (25 May 2004)
  - 225-2 Greece: A Musical Odyssey (29 June 2004)
  - 226-2 Caribbean Playground (27 July 2004)
  - 227-2 World Groove (24 August 2004)
  - 228-2 Women of Latin America (21 September 2004)
  - 229-2 Blues Lounge (5 October 2004)
  - 230-2 Music from the Chocolate Lands (9 November 2004)
  - 231-2 South Pacific Islands (23 November 2004)
- 2005
  - 232-2 New Orleans (25 January 2005)
  - 233-2 Kermit Ruffins (1 February 2005)
  - 234-2 Acoustic Brazil (25 February 2005)
  - 235-2 Afro-Latin Party (22 March 2005)
  - 236-2 Mali (3 May 2005)
  - 237-2 North African Groove (7 June 2005)
  - 238-2 Italian Café (21 June 2005)
  - 239-2 Swing Around the World (5 July 2005)
  - 240-2 American Folk (9 August 2005)
  - 241-2 Latin Lounge (6 September 2005)
  - 242-2 French Playground (4 October 2005)
  - 243-2 Celtic Crossroads (4 October 2005)
  - 244-2 Asian Lounge (8 November 2005)
  - 804-2 One World, One Kid (2005)
- 2006
  - 245-2 The Caribbean (10 January 2006)
  - 246-2 Reggae Playground (24 January 2006)
  - 247-2 Brazilian Lounge (21 February 2006)
  - 248-2 Turkish Groove (21 March 2006)
  - 249-2 Paris (18 April 2006)
  - 250-2 Folk Playground (23 May 2006)
  - 251-2 ¡Baila!: A Latin Dance Party (23 May 2006)
  - 252-2 Music from the Wine Lands (27 June 2006)
  - 253-2 Blues Around the World (25 July 2006)
  - 254-2 Acoustic Africa (5 August 2006)
  - 255-2 Radio Latino (3 October 2006)
  - 256-2 New Orleans Christmas (3 October 2006)
  - 257-2 New Orleans Playground (17 October 2006)
  - 258-2 One World, Many Cultures (7 November 2006)
  - 259-2 Asian Dreamland (5 December 2006)
- 2007
  - 260-2 A New Groove (30 January 2007)
  - 261-2 Women of the World: Acoustic (27 February 2007)
  - 262-2 Gypsy Groove (27 March 2007)
  - 263-2 Putumayo World Party (24 April 2007)
  - 264-2 Animal Playground (22 May 2007)
  - 265-2 Latin Jazz (26 June 2007)
  - 266-2 Americana (31 July 2007)
  - 267-2 World Hits (28 August 2007)
  - 268-2 Israel (25 September 2007)
  - 269-2 Brazilian Playground (25 September 2007)
  - 270-2 New Orleans Brass (23 October 2007)
  - 271-2 Tango Around the World (23 October 2007)
  - 272-2 Celtic Dreamland (6 November 2007)
- 2008
  - 273-2 Latin Reggae (22 January 2008)
  - 274-2 Hawaiian Playground (22 January 2008)
  - 275-2 Euro Groove (11 March 2008)
  - 276-2 African Party (29 April 2008)
  - 277-2 African Dreamland (29 April 2008)
  - 278-2 Café Cubano (27 May 2008)
  - 279-2 Québec (10 June 2008)
  - 280-2 Reggae Around the World (Re-release of 142-2 with different track order and 1 track less) (22 July 2008)
  - 281-2 Acoustic France (19 August 2008)
  - 282-2 Acoustic Arabia (2 September 2008)
  - 283-2 Sesame Street Playground (30 September 2008)
  - 285-2 A Jazz & Blues Christmas (28 October 2008)
  - 286-2 Women of Jazz (28 October 2008)
- 2009
  - 287 African Reggae (27 January 2009)
  - 288 India (24 February 2009)
  - 289 ¡Salsa! (24 March 2009)
  - 290 Italia (19 May 2009)
  - 291 European Playground (19 May 2009)
  - 292 Brazilian Café (28 July 2009)
  - 293 Picnic Playground (28 July 2009)
  - 294 España (29 September 2009)
  - 295 A Family Christmas (27 October 2009)
  - 296 Jazz Around The World (27 October 2009)
- 2010
  - 297 Rhythm & Blues (9 February 2010)
  - 299 Jazz Playground (9 March 2010)
  - 300 Latin Party (6 April 2010)
  - 301 South Africa (18 May 2010)
  - 302 Rock & Roll Playground (29 June 2010)
  - 303 Tribute to a Reggae Legend (13 July 2010)
  - 304 Yoga (14 September 2010)
  - 305 World Christmas Party (5 November 2010)
- 2011
  - 306 Bossa Nova around the world (11 February 2011)
  - 307 Acoustic Dreamland (22 February 2011)
  - 308 Rumba, Mambo, Cha Cha Chá (5 April 2011)
  - 309 Jazz (3 May 2011)
  - 310 Kids World Party (28 June 2011)
  - 311 African Beat (30 August 2011)
  - 312 Latin Beat (30 August 2011)
  - 313 Acoustic Café (12 October 2011)
  - 314 Celtic Christmas (25 October 2011)
- 2012
  - 315 Brazilian Beat (31 January 2012)
  - 316 Instrumental Dreamland (28 February 2012)
  - 317 African Blues (24 April 2012)
  - 318 Cowboy Playground (22 May 2012)
  - 319 Bluegrass (22 May 2012)
  - 320 Arabic Beat (31 July 2012)
  - 321 Latin Beat (Re-Release with 3 new tracks) (11 September 2012)
  - 322 European Playground (Re-Release with 3 new tracks) (11 September 2012)
  - 323 World Yoga (30 October 2012)
  - 324 World Sing-Along (30 October 2012)
- 2013
  - 325 Jewish Celebration (8 November 2013)
  - 326 Vintage France (25 February 2013)
  - 327 African Beat (Updated) (8 March 2013)
  - 328 Rhythm & Blues (Updated) (8 March 2013)
  - 329 Latin Dreamland
  - 330 Women of Brazil (21 May 2013)
  - 331 Brazilian Lounge (Re-Release) (21 May 2013)
  - 332 Brazilian Beat (Re-Release) (September 2013)
  - 333 Acoustic America (18 June 2013)
  - 334 American Playground (18 June 2013)
  - 336 Reggae Playground (Re-Release with 3 new tracks) (26 July 2013)
  - 337 World Reggae (Re-Release with 6 new tracks) (26 July 2013)
  - 338 Café Latino (24 September 2013)
  - 339 Latin Lounge (Re-Release with 3 new tracks) (24 September 2013)
  - 340 Acoustic Christmas (10 November 2013)
- 2014
  - 341 Native America (18 February 2014)
  - 342 Music of the Andes (29 April 2014)
  - 343 Australia (27 May 2014)
  - 344 Australian Playground (27 May 2014)
  - 345 Americana (Re-Release with 6 new tracks) (22 July 2014)
  - 346 Cajun (Re-Release with 5 new tracks) (22 July 2014)
  - 347 Yoga Lounge (30 October 2014)
  - 348 Cafe Del Mundo (30 September 2014)
  - 349 French Christmas (28 October 2014)
- 2015
  - 350 Celtic Café (6 February 2015)
  - 351 Asian Playground (31 March 2015)
  - 352 Animal Playground (Re-Release with 4 new tracks) (31 March 2015)
  - 353 Afro-Caribbean Party (29 May 2015)
  - 354 Vintage Latino (31 August 2015)
  - 355 French Dreamland (30 October 2015)
  - 357 French Café (Re-Release with 7 new tracks) (20 November 2015)
- 2016
  - 356 Jazz Café (2 March 2016)
  - 358 French Playground (Re-Release with 4 new tracks) (18 March 2016)
  - 359 Mexico (Re-Release with 4 new tracks) (29 April 2016)
  - 360 Blues Party (4 July 2016)
  - 361 Acoustic Yoga (12 October 2016)
  - 362 African Rumba (11 November 2016)
  - 363 Latin Christmas (31 October 2016)
- 2017
  - 364 Vintage Italia (24 March 2017)
  - 365 Italian Playground (24 March 2017)
  - 366 Cuba! Cuba! (19 May 2017)
  - 367 Cuban Playground (19 May 2017)
  - 368 Indian Groove (1 September 2017)
- 2018
  - 369 African Café (23 February 2018)
  - 370 Kid's African Party (23 February 2018)
  - 371 New Orleans Party (20 April 2018)
  - 372 Ska Around the World (31 August 2018)
  - 374 Joy to the World (16 November 2018)
- 2019
  - 375 Broadway Jazz (25 January 2019)
  - 376 Acoustic Women (5 April 2019)
  - 377 World Peace (14 June 2019)
  - 378 Paris Café (18 October 2019)
  - 379 Blues Christmas (29 November 2019)
- 2020
  - 380 Celtic Women (14 January 2020)
  - 381 Brazil: Samba, Bossa & Beyond! (28 May 2020)
  - 382 New Orleans Mambo (23 October 2020)
- 2021
  - 383 Yoga Dreamland (26 February 2021)
  - 384 World Cafe (30 April 2021)
  - 385 Acoustic Paris (5 November 2021)
  - 386 Jazz Christmas (26 November 2021)
- 2022
  - 387 World Chill (25 February 2022) (only digital)
  - 388 Acoustic World (8 April 2022) (only digital) (first collection of discovery series)
  - 389 Blues Cafe (29 April 2022)
  - 390 Global Groove (20 May 2022) (only digital) (second collection of discovery series)
  - 391 World Party (24 June 2022) (only digital) (third collection of discovery series)
  - 392 Acoustic World 2 (8 July 2022) (only digital)
  - 393 Afro Cubano (29 July 2022)
  - 394 Reggae World (19 August 2022) (only digital)
  - 395 World Party 2 (16 September 2022) (only digital)
  - 396 Feels Like Home Linda Ronstadt's Musical Odyssey (30 September 2022)
  - 397 Global Lounge (14 October 2022) (only digital)
  - 398 World Relaxation (18 November 2022) (only digital)
  - 399 World Party 3 (2 December 2022) (only digital)
  - 400 Acoustic World 3 (16 December 2022) (only digital)
- 2023
  - 401 Global Groove 2 (6 January 2023) (only digital)
  - 402 Reggae World 2 (3 March 2023) (only digital)
  - 403 Acoustic World 4 (10 March 2023) (only digital)
  - 404 African Yoga (31 March 2023)
  - 405 World Party 4 (28 April 2023) (only digital)
  - 406 Acoustic World 5 (5 May 2023) (only digital)
  - 407 Global Lounge 2 (12 May 2023) (only digital)
  - 408 World Relaxation 2 (26 May 2023) (only digital)
  - 409 Acoustic World 6 (9 June 2023 (only digital)
  - 410 Acoustic Latino (16 June 2023) (only digital) (first full length digital collection)
  - 411 Acoustic Folk (23 June 2023) (only digital)
  - 412 World Party 5 (30 June 2023) (only digital)
  - 413 Global Groove 3 (7 July 2023) (only digital)
  - 414 Reggae World 3 (22 July 2023) (only digital)
  - 415 Bossa Nova (28 July 2023)
  - 416 Acoustic World 7 (11 August 2023) (only digital)
  - 417 Acoustic World 8 (22 September 2023) (only digital)
  - 418 African Acoustic (29 September 2023 (only digital)
  - 419 Acoustic Folk 2 (6 October 2023) (only digital)
  - 420 Global Groove 4 (20 October 2023) (only digital)
  - 421 Global Reggae (27 October 2023) (only digital)
  - 422 Global Cafe (17 November 2023) (only digital)
- 2024
  - 423 Tropical Party (12 January 2024) (only digital)
  - 424 Mediterranean Cafe (26 January 2024) (only digital)
  - 425 World Love Songs (9 February 2024) (only digital)
  - 426 Fiesta Latina (23 February 2024) (only digital)
  - 427 Women of the World (8 March 2024) (only digital)
  - 428 Caribbean Celebration (22 March 2024) (only digital)
  - 429 Global Beat (12 April 2024) (only digital)
  - 430 Cafe du Monde (26 April 2024) (only digital)
  - 431 Global Relaxation (10 May 2024) (only digital)
  - 432 African Celebration (24 May 2024) (only digital)
  - Reggae Routes (26 July 2024) (only digital)
  - Cultural Crossroads (27 December 2024) (only digital)
- 2025
  - Lounge du Monde (14 March 2025
  - Jazz World (28 March 2025) (only digital)
  - Brazilian Party (9 May 2025) (only digital)
  - Latin American Women (23 May 2025) (only digital)
  - Groove Africa (6 June 2025) (only digital)
  - Café Nomadica (27 June 2025) (only digital)
  - Afro-Portuguesa (11 July 2025) (only digital)
  - World Beach Party (25 July 2025) (only digital)
  - Dream World - Soothing Songs Around the Globe (8 August 2025) (only digital)
  - French Groove (22 August 2025) (only digital)
  - Instrumental Odyssey (5 September 2025) (only digital)
  - Latin Chill (19 September 2025) (only digital)
  - Acoustic Coffeehouse (10 October 2025) (only digital)
  - World Road Trip (24 October 2025) (only digital)
  - Coffee Culture (21 November 2025) (only digital)
  - Nordic Nights (19 December 2025) (only digital)
- 2026
  - Caribbean Cruise (29 January 2026) (only digital)
  - French Bossa Nova (30 January 2026) (only digital)
  - Love Songs Around the World (13 February 2026) (only digital)
  - Café Feminina (27 February 2026) (only digital)
  - Celtic Voices (13 March 2026) (only digital)
  - Global Guitars (27 March 2026) (only digital)
  - American Roots (10 April 2026) (only digital)
