= Parys (disambiguation) =

Parys is a town in South Africa.

Parys may also refer to:

- Parys Mountain, on Anglesey, Wales
- Parys, Warmian-Masurian Voivodeship, Polish village
- Parys (name), includes a list of people with the name
- De Parys, electoral ward and area within the town of Bedford, Bedfordshire, England
- Parys (House of Assembly of South Africa constituency)

== See also ==
- Paries, Latin for wall
- PARY, code for Ruby Airport
- Paris (disambiguation)
