= Ricardo Lemvo =

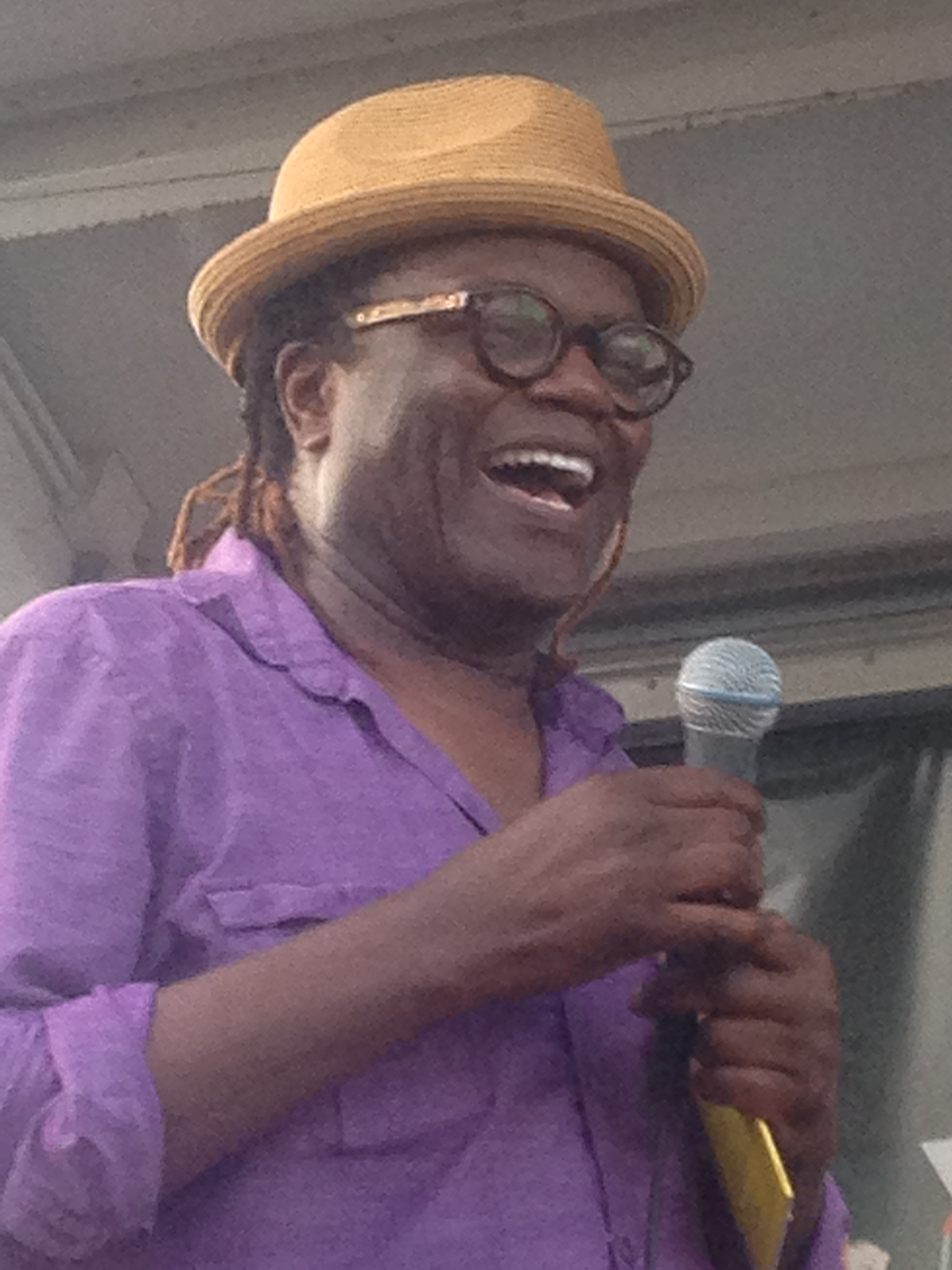
- Ricardo Lemvo, performing in Manhattan Beach, California, July 2018

Background information
- Born: September 4, 1957 (age 69); Kimpese, Democratic Republic of the Congo
- Origin: Los Angeles, United States
- Genres: Salsa, soukous, kizomba
- Years active: 1990–present
- Label: Mopiato Music
- Website: http://www.makinaloca.com/

Ricardo Lemvo (born September 4, 1957) is a Congolese singer of Angolan descent who lives in Los Angeles, California. His music is a blend of African soukous, kizomba, samba and Cuban salsa.

== Early years and family ==
Lemvo was born in Kimpese, Democratic Republic of the Congo, and as a boy he lived in Kinshasa. His family is Angolan, from M'banza-Kongo in the northern part of Angola. His grandfather, João Mantantu Dundulu N'lemvo, was a Baptist pastor who worked with British missionaries in the 1880s, and was the first Angolan to translate the English-language Bible into Kikongo. Although Lemvo grew up in the D.R.C. and later in the United States, he said in an interview that Angolan is foremost among his three nationalities: (translated) "I am the product of these three countries, but I feel Angolan on top of everything, because it is in this country that my roots are located, inside Kongo dya Ntontila." (Note: Portuguese original: "Sou o produto destes três paises, mas sinto-me angolano em cima de tudo, porque é neste pais que se situa as minhas raizes, no interior de Kongo dya Ntontila."))

As a 13- or 14-year-old, in Kinshasa during breaks from his Catholic boarding school in Gombe-Matadi, Lemvo joined a youth band called Mira Mira, singing American R&B songs by James Brown and Otis Redding. Kinshasa is where Lemvo first encountered and enjoyed Cuban music; taking advantage of a cousin's large record collection, he would listen to Orquesta Aragón, Arsenio Rodríguez, Sonora Matancera and Abelardo Barroso. He also credited his musical interest to the fact that his parents' house in Kinshasa was next to a bar, which would loudly play Congolese and Cuban rumba, as well as New York salsa, at all hours.

He moved to California, in the United States, at age 15 to continue his education, and has lived there since. He graduated from Lawndale High School and later from California State University, Los Angeles with a bachelor's degree in Political Science.

Lemvo has a daughter, Isabela, whose name is the title of one of his songs and the title of the band's 2007 album.

== Career ==
In 1990, though he does not read music or play any instrument, Lemvo formed the band Makina Loca. That name is, according to The Mercury News, "an appropriately multilingual pun that means 'crazy machine' in Spanish and roughly 'dancing in a trance' in Kikongo." With Makina Loca, Lemvo has become, again according to The Mercury News, "one of the most creative and successful salsa bandleaders" in Southern California.

Lemvo sings in English, French, Kikongo, Kimbundu, Lingala, Lucumi, Portuguese, Spanish, Swahili, and Turkish. He blends Latin and African musical styles, "sprinkling in rumba, merengue or Afro-Portuguese elements." His earlier recordings, including the 1998 hit "Mambo Yo Yo," were largely based on mixing Congolese rumba and soukous with Cuban son and salsa, but more recently Lemvo explored his Angolan heritage, singing in Portuguese and indigenous Angolan languages, and playing Angolan rhythms such as semba and kizomba. The latter form of music was influenced by the French-Caribbean zouk. Guest artists on his recordings have included well-known Congolese, Cape Verdean, and Cuban musicians Sam Mangwana, Papa Noël, Nyboma, Wuta Mayi, Syran Mbenza, Bopol Mansiamina, "Huit Kilos" Nseka, Maria de Barros, and Alfredo de la Fé.

Lemvo and Makina Loca appeared in the 1998 movie Dance With Me starring Vanessa Williams and Chayanne. in 1998, the American World Music Awards, a spin-off of the Houston International Festival, honored Lemvo as Emerging Artist of the Year. At the 2015 Angola Music Awards Lemvo won Music D'Ouro for the song "Curtição (A resposta)".

In addition to regularly playing Los Angeles clubs, Lemvo has toured widely, and has performed at prestigious festivals throughout Europe, the Americas and Australia. As a few examples, he has played at the John F. Kennedy Center's Millennium Stage in Washington, D.C., in June 1998, the Roskilde Festival in Denmark in 2000, the HeimatKlänge Festival in Berlin in July–August 2001, the Red Sea Jazz Festival in Eilat, Israel in August 2001, New York's SOB's in July 2007, the National Folk Festival in Butte, Montana in July 2008, the Planet Arlington World Music festival in Arlington, Virginia, in August 2008, Lincoln Center's Midsummer Night Swing in New York in April 2014 Chicago SummerDance and two other festivals in Chicago and Evanston, Illinois in July 2014, the LACMA's "Latin Sounds" series of summer concerts in September 2018, and the North Carolina Folk Festival in September 2019.

== Assessments and significance ==
Critic Robert Christgau described Lemvo's appeal, saying, "In five different non-English languages he invites cousin after cousin into the extended family--from boogaloo to rumba, bolero to son--and defines the groove they share with his own contained dynamics." Jon Pareles, in a New York Times capsule review of the 2007 album Isabella, wrote that "While Mr. Lemvo sings in a honeyed Congolese croon, the styles on “Isabela” bounce back and forth across the Atlantic in separate songs: Cuban charanga, Angolan kizomba, boogaloo, Congolese soukous. Mr. Lemvo wrote most of the songs — though not the bolero in Turkish — and his fusions are supple, never forced."

A Boston Globe profile notes how Lemvo's music brings to life the idea, championed by scholars including Robert Farris Thompson and Paul Gilroy, of the Black Atlantic, "the centuries-old exchange of rhythm and culture that began with the Middle Passage, when slaves brought their sounds to Cuba and Haiti." In an essay in which he calls attention to Lemvo, anthropologist Bob W. White describes Congolese rumba in terms of "the mind-bending genealogical tale of successive musical waves back and forth across the Atlantic Ocean," how Africans taken to Cuba in the slave trade and their descendants developed rumba, and how Cuban records were played in Congo leading to development of Africanized versions of that music, namely the Congolese rumba and then soukous. Describing how Lemvo marks another generation of that trans-Atlantic cross-fertilzation, combining those related Cuban and Congolese forms of music, as well as other African-influenced musics of the old and new worlds, into Lemvo's own mix, the scholar and musician Ned Sublette, "an authority on Cuban music and its African roots and branches," said "Ricardo is the only one, right now, looking at the totality of what this is. The entire time I’ve known him, he’s been looking at the big picture."

== Discography ==
Credited artist for all of the following: Ricardo Lemvo & Makina Loca

- Tata Masamba (Mopiato Music) (1996)
- Mambo Yo Yo (Putumayo World Music) (1998)
- São Salvador (Putumayo World Music) (1999)
- "Boom Boom Tarara" (Putumayo World Music) [digipack single] (2000)
- Ay Valeria! (Mopiato Music) (2003)
- Isabela (Mopiato Music) (2007)
- Retrospectiva (Mopiato Music) [compilation] (2009)
- La Rumba SoYo (Cumbancha) (2014)
- N'dona Ponte (Mopiato Music) [digital download] (2020)
