= Houston International Festival =

Music festival held annually in Houston, Texas

- Genre: various
- Dates: Last two weekends of April
- Locations: Houston, Texas, United States
- Years active: 1971 - 2014
- Website: www.ifest.org (defunct)

Houston International Festival, also known as iFest, was a contemporary, multi-disciplinary, multi-cultural arts and music festival held annually in Houston, Texas. This North American festival takes place every April on 16 acres (65,000 m^{2}) in downtown Houston's parks and plazas. By city ordinance this annual 10-day event is Houston's official city celebration of the visual and performing arts. According to an article in the Houston Chronicle, Ifest announced in June 2014 that it was seeking Chapter 7 bankruptcy protection, making it clear that the 2014 fest would be the last ever festival.

== Overview ==
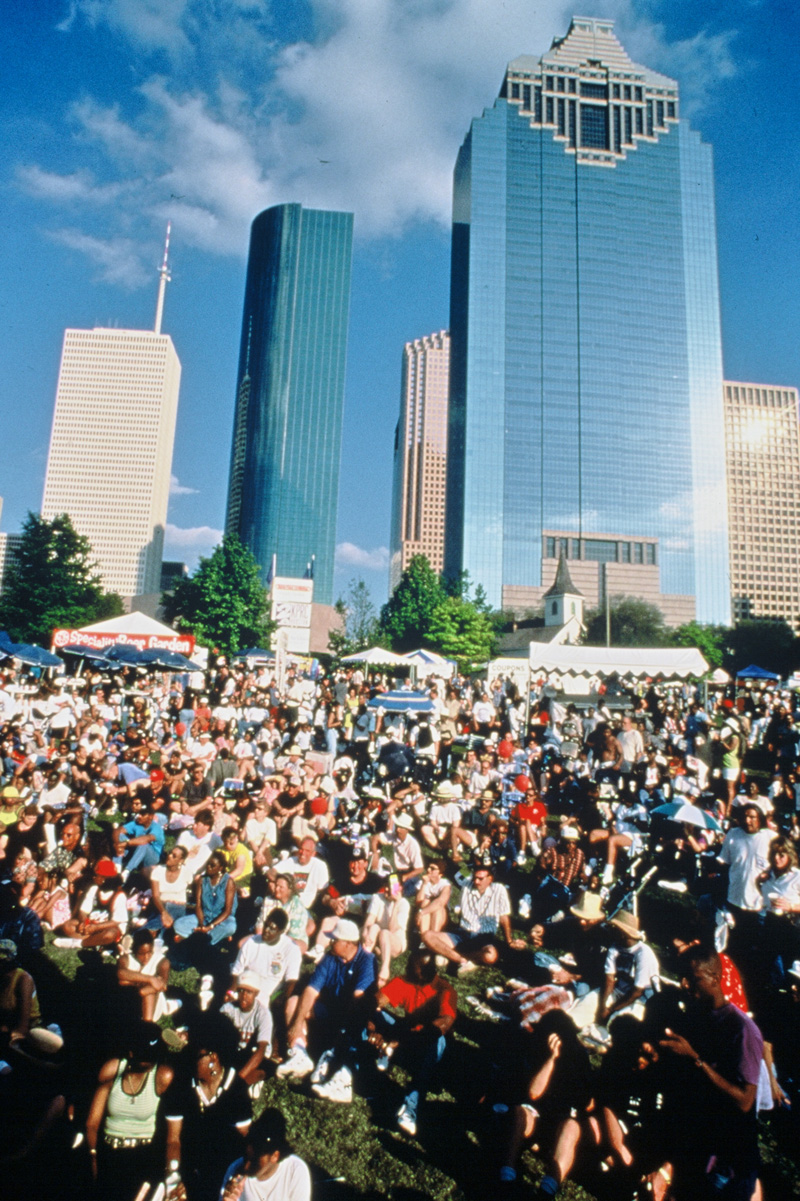

The annual downtown event celebrates music, dance and cultures from around the world. Early festivals featured almost exclusively local acts; as the festival grew, more international and nationally known artists (most recently in 2010, George Clinton, Steel Pulse, Eddie Palmieri, and Ozomatli were scheduled in addition to regional and local performers).

The festival features vendors selling local and international foods and crafts. iFest also features six to eight arts markets with more than 400 artists including a juried art market.

The festival has the large areas dedicated to cultural and educational exhibits depicting different cultures. The footprint is divided into zones, each one focusing on a specific culture through food, exhibits and entertainment. The Living Museum represents the spotlighted culture each year with iconic structures, interactive exhibits, artisan demonstrations and performances.

The festival impacts Houston's tourism and economy by drawing 22% tourists attendance and generates local and state tourist-based taxes of $2.19 million.

The Houston International Festival is owned by the Houston Festival Foundation, Inc., a 501 (c)(3) organization, which uses the proceeds from the festival for year-round arts and education programs for schoolchildren in the Greater Houston area.

== History ==
In 1971 Main Street 1 was the name given to a Salute to the Arts to be held Downtown—a weekend happening of celebrations highlighting the performing and visual arts, on the sidewalks, streets, and store windows located between Dallas and McKinney on Main Street in Houston, Texas. Sakowitz and Foleys Department Stores, and the Cultural Affairs Committee of the Houston Chamber of Commerce, with the blessing of Mayor Louie Welch, sponsored the event. It was the beginning of the cultural salute that grew and evolved into today's Houston International Festival. In 1987, iFest began featuring the art and culture of a different honoured country each year and began complementing local artists with regional, national and international artists. Today, the international component sets the tone for an evolving celebration of world culture.

== Timeline ==
1973: Houston's Main Street Art Happening was moved from Downtown Houston, Texas (where the City Ordinance prohibited street closings) to the Houston Museum of Fine Arts and its grounds across from the Contemporary Arts Museum, still on Main but now more "mid-town". This attempt at an outdoor-indoor celebration created safety concerns with crowds of pedestrians crossing streets, so in...

1974: The Art Happening moved to Hermann Park, near the Museum. It was expanded to two weekends to help minimize the risk of inclement weather affecting attendance.

1976: The event was named "The Houston Festival", and remained so for the next ten years. The organizational structure changed, with the creation of The Houston Festival Foundation, a 501 (c)(3) non-profit with its own board of directors and budget, separate from the Houston Chamber of Commerce sponsorship. The foundation still remains the producing entity today.

1977: The festival moved back downtown, this time with two stages across from the Alley Theatre and Jones Hall, at what is now Jones Plaza. Attendance grew but expansion was limited in that site.

1979: The festival moved to a larger potential site at Market Square, in order to accommodate the growing number of participants and attendees.

1980 The Houston Festival Foundation, a non-profit 501(c)3 organization was spun off, as an independent entity, from the Houston Chamber of Commerce, with a mission to celebrate and promote the arts of Houston to the rest of the world. It was supported by the City of Houston, the Houston Cultural Arts Council, and the Greater Houston Convention and Visitors Council. The board of Directors hired their first President, Rochella Cooper who immediately set out to involve the performing, visual, and literary arts organizations and individuals in promoting Houston through the Festival.

1981 The Festival expanded its location to encompass, over the next six years, twenty downtown blocks including nine performing stages, 350 fine craft artists, an outdoor sculpture exhibition along the banks of the Buffalo Bayou, and the involvement of all major arts organizations. (Houston Symphony, Houston Grand Opera, Houston Ballet, and The Alley Theatre) And all of this was free to the public.

1983 The president was charged by the board of directors with developing a five year plan that would include the important sesquicentennial of Houston and Texas in 1986. Out of this plan emerged the big event in 1986.

1985 The first Art Car Parade took place during the Houston Festival exposing thousands of attendees to the creativity of the art car makers.

1986 New Music America, a national showcase for new music, chose Houston for their annual gathering of top professionals in all genre including world renowned composers such as John Cage.

1986: "Rendez-vous Houston", highlighting the anniversaries of Houston and Texas Sesquicentennial celebrations was the biggest event ever staged in Houston, produced as the centerpiece of the Houston Festival. Lasers and fireworks danced above and around the skyscrapers downtown accompanied by French composer Jean-Michel Jarre's original music compositions. In June 1986 President Rochella Cooper resigned to accept other opportunities. Dr. James Austin was hired in late summer 1986, and with the board set out to re-examine the path and future for the festival. This began the expansion of the basic concepts of the event, adding the now-established education and business collaborations and programs.

1987: The name of the celebration was changed to "The Houston International Festival" to celebrate Houston's role as an international city. Following this event, a plan was developed to spotlight the arts and cultures of an individual country or region of the world each year, with request for assistance from the participating governments at the highest levels possible. At this point the board of directors decided to charge admission to the Festival and fenced the entire area to contain the event.

1988: Australia was the first country of honor, with the international theme presenting an amalgam of that country's culture and arts. A different country or region in alternate parts of the globe were to be selected for the "spotlight" thereafter, although the festival continued to build more performing stages to ensure on-going presentations of arts from throughout the world during the two-week event.

1989-2003: 1989 continued the new pattern with the spotlight on France, followed by the United Kingdom (1990); Japan (1991); Spain & the New World (1992); Mexico (1993); Italy (1994); Turkey (1995); West Africa (1996); China (1997); Islands of the Caribbean (1998); Southern Africa (1999); Brazil for the 2000 Millennium; Ireland (2001); and a revisit to France in 2002 and Mexico in 2003. After twenty years, the City Ordinance regarding the festival's unique status lapsed, and downtown Houston was in the throes of a major renaissance of urban development and street improvements. Possible congestion and other factors presented the foundation with the need for an examination for alternative sites. The Houston International Festival moved south, this time following the tracks of the METRO's new light rail transportation line for better access and more space to Reliant Park.

2004: The Houston International Festival turned towards Asia with its first spotlight on Thailand at Festival Plaza at Reliant Park. Five Asian elephants joined the programming mix in a special appeal to families.

2005-2007: The Houston International Festival returned to its previous downtown footprint covering 16 acres (65,000 m^{2}) in downtown Houston parks and plazas. iFest turned its spotlight on India in 2005, Jamaica in 2006 and China in 2007.

2008: The Houston International Festival offered a new twist on its honored country theme. The theme for iFest 2008, "Out of Africa: the Three Journeys", celebrated the rich history, achievements, contributions and triumphs of African people in Africa, the Caribbean, Latin America, the United States and the rest of the world.

2009: iFest returned to its honored country theme and revisited the culture of Ireland.

2010: The honored region for the 2010 Houston International Festival was the Caribbean.

2011: THE SILK ROAD – The 2011 theme for the Houston International Festival follows the route of Marco Polo with a focus on China, India and other cultures of the Silk Road.

2012: Honored country was Argentina.

2013: Honored country was Brazil.

2014: Australia becomes the honored country theme.

June 2014: Houston Festival Foundation announces plans to file for Chapter 7 bankruptcy.

== Presenters of world music ==
From its inception in 1971, artists from Houston had been the primary source of programming. In 1987, iFest began featuring the art and culture of a different honored country each year and began complementing local artists with regional, national and international artists. The festival is a very popular event in Texas for world music, afropop, blues, rock, country, reggae, soul, cajun, zydeco and almost all other music fans. The event features hundreds of performers on six to ten stages including many internationally touring artists. The festival has become one of the premier music festivals in the state of Texas. Performers who have appeared at the festival include:

- John Lee Hooker - USA
- Bobby Blue Band - USA
- Clarence Gatemouth Brown - USA
- Koko Tayler - USA
- Lucinda Williams - USA
- Jimmie Dale Gilmore - USA
- Jerry Jeff Walker - USA
- Dave Alvin - USA
- The Flatlanders - USA
- Grady Gaines - USA (Texas)
- Chris Perez - USA (Texas)
- Ezra Charles - USA (Texas)
- Smythe and Taylor - USA (Texas)
- Joe Ely - USA
- Delbert McClinton - USA
- Quetzal (band) - USA
- Shawn Colvin - USA
- Bakra Bata - USA
- Trish Murphy - USA (Texas). Also performed as "Trish and Daren."
- Hugh Masekela - South Africa
- Abdullah Ibrahim - South Africa
- Ramsey Lewis - USA
- Flora Purim & Airto - Brazil
- Paris Combo - France
- Tete Montoliu - Spain
- Michel Petrucciani - France
- World Saxophone Quartet - USA
- Youssou N'Dour - Senegal
- Salif Keita - Mali
- Baaba Maal - Senegal
- Babatunde Olatunji - Nigeria
- Angélique Kidjo - Benin
- Ashe Dancers - Jamaica
- Blue Glades Mento Band - Jamaica
- Brave Combo - USA
- Avizo - USA
- Grupo Fantasma - USA
- Morgan Heritage - Jamaica
- Yerba Bueno - USA
- Red Elvises - USA
- La Bottine Souriante - Quebec
- Skatalites - Jamaica
- Stephen Marley - Jamaica
- Billy Joe Shaver - USA
- Tinariwen - Tuareg-Sahara
- Gangbe Brass Band - Benin
- Ba Cissoko - Guinea
- George Clinton & Parliament-Funkadelic - USA
- Amazones Women Master Drummers of Guinea - Guinea
- Afrissippi - USA
- Yellow Man - Jamaica
- Wayne Henderson & the Jazz Crusaders - USA
- Clinton Fearon - Jamaica
- Vieux Farka Toure - Mali
- Chic Gamine - Quebec
- Marc Broussard - USA
- Mavis Staples - USA
- Alpha YaYa Diallo - Guinea
- Steel Pulse - Great Britain/Jamaica
- La Excelencia - USA
- Cesária Évora- Cape Verde
- Femi Kuti & Positive Force - Nigeria
- King Sunny Adé - Nigeria
- Ali Farka Toure - Mali
- Papa Wemba - Nigeria
- Thomas Mapfumo- Zimbabwe
- Zap Mama- Democratic Republic of Congo
- Oumou Sangare - Mali
- Tabu Ley Rochereau- Democratic Republic of Congo
- Super Rail Band - Mali
- Cubanismo- Cuba
- Los Munequitos de Matanzas - Cuba
- Maraca - Cuba
- Burning Spear - Jamaica
- Boukman Eksperyans - Haiti
- Sharon Shannon - Ireland
- Natalie MacMaster - Canada
- Ralph Stanley & The Clinch Mountain Boys - USA
- George Plimpton - USA
- Richard Thompson - UK
- Paul Brady - Ireland
- Penguin Café Orchestra - UK
- Courtney Pine - UK
- Beijing Acrobatic Circus - People's Republic of China
- World Champion Trinity Irish Dancers - USA
- Théâtre de l'Unité- France
- Robert Cray Band - USA
- Lavelle White - USA
- Iguanas - USA
- Kermit Ruffins - USA
- Ivan Neville - USA
- Terrance Simien - USA
- Buckwheat Zydeco - USA
- New Birth Brass Band - USA
- Gena Delafose - USA
- Eric Taylor - USA
- J.J. Grey & Mofro - USA
- Shake Russell - USA
- Shenzhen Acrobatic Circus - China
- Johnny Bush - USA
- Bettye LaVette - USA
- Harrison Kumi - Ghana
- Emeline Michel - Haiti
- The Wailers - Jamaica
- Emman Legrand - Congo
- Joaquin Diaz - Dominican Republic
- Lowrider Band - USA
- Rootz Underground - Jamaica
- Rachid Taha - Algeria
- Marcia Ball - USA
- CJ Chenier - USA
- Little Joe y la Familia - USA
- Marima Ponies - Japan
- Governor's Island Samba School - Brazil
- Zip Zap Circus - South Africa
- The Staple Singers - USA
- Blind Boys of Alabama - USA
- Nanci Griffith - USA
- Sweet Honey in the Rock - USA
- Paco de Lucía - Spain
- Milton Nascimento - Brazil
- Stomu Yamashta - Japan
- Café Tacuba - Mexico
- Los Lobos - USA
- Texas Tornados - USA
- Poncho Sanchez - USA
- Flaco Jiménez - USA
- Tito Puente - Puerto Rico
- Beau Jocque - USA
- Royal Thai Ballet - Thailand
- Dana Jackson - USA
- United We Funk Allstars - USA
- Beat the Donkey - Brazil
- Kem - USA
- Keith Frank - USA
- Neutral Sisters - Jamaica/USA
- Krosfyah - Barbados
- Lucky Dube - South Africa
- Ricardo Lemvo - Democratic Republic of Congo
- Bob Schneider - USA
- Kelly Willis - USA
- Los Lonely Boys - USA
- Buddy Guy - USA
- Emmylou Harris - USA
- Jesse Dayton - USA
- Reckless Kelly - USA
- Joss Stone - USA
- Cory Morrow - USA
- Shemekia Copeland - USA
- The Neville Brothers - USA
- Menwar - Mauritius
- The Garifuna Collective - Belize
- Habib Koite & Barmada - Mali
- Taj Mahal - USA
- Jimmy "T99" Nelson - USA
- Samarabalouf - France
- Charlie Musselwhite - USA
- Beoga - Ireland
- The Wailing Souls - Jamaica
- Plena Libre - Puerto Rico
- Ohio Players - USA
- Ozomatli - Aztlan
- Mighty Diamonds - Jamaica
- Eddie Palmieri
- Taj Weekes & Adowa - St. Lucia
- Bassekou Kouyate & Ngoni Ba -Mali
- Lagbaja - Nigeria
