= Paris metropolitan area (disambiguation) =

The Paris metropolitan area is an area that describes the reach of commuter movement to and from Paris.

The Paris metropolitan area may also refer to:

- The Paris, Texas micropolitan area, United States
- The Paris, Tennessee micropolitan area, United States

== See also ==
- Paris (disambiguation)
