= SS Paris =

A number of steamships have carried the name Paris, after the French capital city.

- SS Paris (1852), Built for the London, Brighton and South Coast Railway, wrecked in 1863
- SS Paris (1865), built by Barclay, Curle & Co
- SS Paris (1875), Built for the London, Brighton and South Coast Railway. Sold in 1888.
- SS Paris (1878), built for the London, Chatham and Dover Railway, lost in 1913.
- SS Paris (Fairfield, 1888), Built for the London, Brighton and South Coast Railway.
- SS Paris (Thompson, 1888), built for the American Line.
- SS Paris (1899), a Belgian ship renamed Charles Jose in 1933 and lost in 1934.
- SS Paris (1910), a Norwegian cargo ship sunk in 1917.
- SS Paris (1913), a passenger ship built for the London, Brighton and South Coast Railway, bombed and sunk in 1940
- SS Paris (1916), a Compagnie Générale Transatlantique liner lost by fire in 1939, capsized in Le Havre harbour and remained there for the duration of World War II.
- SS Paris (1922), a Norwegian passenger ship seized by the Kriegsmarine in 1940 and torpedoed and sunk in 1945.
- SS Paris (1927), a British collier that collided with another ship and sank in 1941.
