= Paris, Wisconsin =

Paris is the name of some places in the U.S. state of Wisconsin:

- Paris, Grant County, Wisconsin, a town
- Paris, Kenosha County, Wisconsin, a town
- Paris (community), Wisconsin, an unincorporated community in Kenosha County
