= ZNF746 =

Protein-coding gene in the species Homo sapiens

Identifiers
- Aliases: ZNF746, P.A.R.I.S, PARIS, zinc finger protein 746
- External IDs: OMIM: 613914; MGI: 1916478; GeneCards: ZNF746

Gene location (Human)
Chr.	Chromosome 7 (human)
Band	7q36.1	Start	149,472,696 bp
Band	7q36.1	End	149,497,817 bp

Gene location (Mouse)
Chr.	Chromosome 6 (mouse)
Band	6|6 B2.3	Start	48,039,329 bp
Band	6|6 B2.3	End	48,063,527 bp
RNA expression pattern
Bgee	Human / Mouse (ortholog); Top expressed in: blood; granulocyte; mucosa of ileum; spleen; monocyte; bone marrow cell; left testis; stromal cell of endometrium; right testis; sural nerve / Top expressed in: otic placode; saccule; otic vesicle; granulocyte; genital tubercle; blood; spermatocyte; condyle; Paneth cell; fossa; More reference expression data
BioGPS	n/a
Gene ontology
Molecular function	DNA-binding transcription factor activity; RNA polymerase II cis-regulatory region sequence-specific DNA binding; DNA binding; DNA-binding transcription repressor activity, RNA polymerase II-specific; protein binding; ubiquitin protein ligase binding; metal ion binding; nucleic acid binding; DNA-binding transcription factor activity, RNA polymerase II-specific
Cellular component	cytoplasm; intracellular anatomical structure; nucleus
Biological process	negative regulation of transcription, DNA-templated; positive regulation of neuron death; negative regulation of transcription by RNA polymerase II; regulation of transcription, DNA-templated; transcription, DNA-templated; positive regulation of transcription by RNA polymerase II
Sources:Amigo / QuickGO
Orthologs
Databases	NCBI: entry; OMA: entry
Species	Human	Mouse
Entrez	155061	69228
Ensembl	ENSG00000181220	ENSMUSG00000057691
UniProt	Q6NUN9	Q3U133
RefSeq (mRNA)	NM_001163474; NM_152557; NM_001363517; NM_001394198	NM_001163475; NM_001347142; NM_001362062
RefSeq (protein)	NP_001156946; NP_689770; NP_001350446	NP_001156947; NP_001334071; NP_001348991
Location (UCSC)	Chr 7: 149.47 – 149.5 Mb	Chr 6: 48.04 – 48.06 Mb
PubMed search
- Wikidata
View/Edit Human	View/Edit Mouse

Zinc finger protein 746 also known as Parkin-interacting substrate (PARIS) is a zinc finger protein that, in humans, is encoded by the ZNF746 gene and is involved in the neurodegeneration of Parkinson's disease.
