= Paris, Denmark =

Coordinates: 56°30′51″N 8°29′22″E

Paris
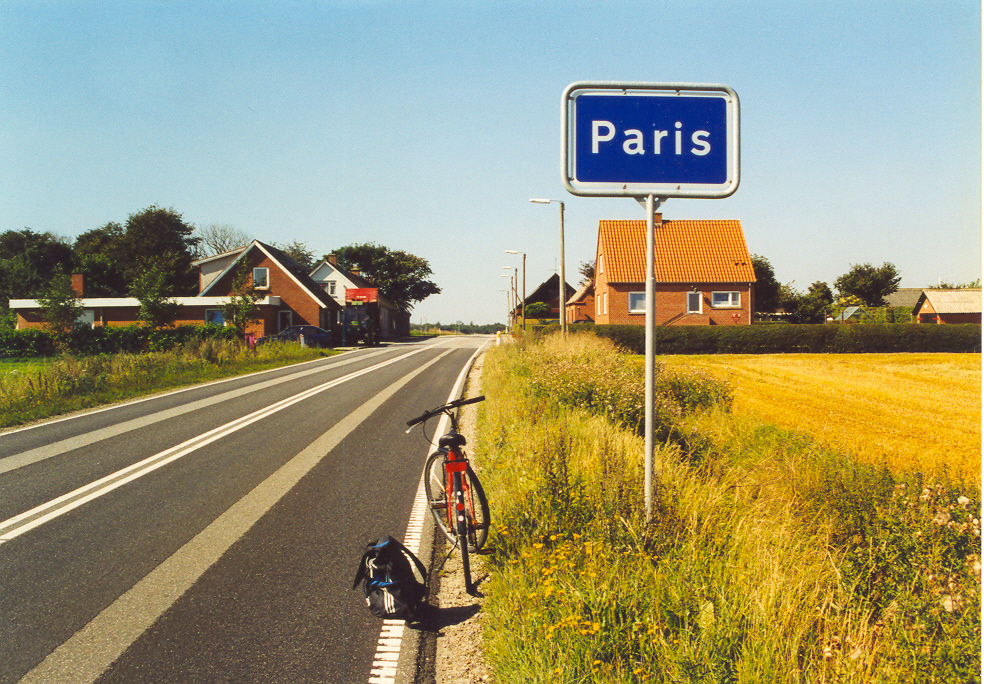

- Location within Denmark
- Country: Denmark
- Region: Central Denmark (Midtjylland)
- Municipality: Lemvig

Government
  - Mayor: Erik Flyvholm

Population (2009)
  - Total: 12
- Time zone: UTC+1 (Central Europe Time)
  - Summer (DST): UTC+2
- Postal code: 7620

Paris is a hamlet belonging to the Lemvig Municipality, located in Jutland in Denmark. It has a population of 12 and eight or nine houses. Residents hold a local festival once a year. The hamlet was visited by comedian Jan Gintberg, who made fun of the inhabitants. It is located 7.5 kilometres (4.7 mi) from Lemvig on the road to Struer. Another village south of nearby Lemvig is named Rom after Rome.
