= Parisii =

Parisii may refer to two ancient Iron Age tribes:

- Parisii (Gaul)
- Parisii (Yorkshire)

== See also ==
- Belgae
