= Paris Peak =

Mountain in Anvers Island, Antarctica

Paris Peak (64°30′S 63°22′W) is a conspicuous peak, 1,645 m, standing 4 nautical miles (7 km) northeast of Mount Priam in the Trojan Range of Anvers Island, in the Palmer Archipelago. It is snow covered on the south side, but the north side is formed by sheer rock scarps. Surveyed by the Falkland Islands Dependencies Survey (FIDS) in 1955 and named by the United Kingdom Antarctic Place-Names Committee (UK-APC) for Paris, son of Priam, whose abduction of Helen caused the Trojan War in Homer's Iliad.
