= Parizh, Kiginsky District, Republic of Bashkortostan =

Parizh Париж
- Village
- Location within Bashkortostan Location within Russia
- Coordinates: 55°33′N 58°35′E
- Country: Russia
- Region: Bashkortostan
- District: Kiginsky District
- Time zone: UTC+5:00

Parizh (Russian: Париж) is a rural locality (a village) in Nizhnekiginsky Selsoviet, Kiginsky District, Bashkortostan, Russia. The population was 25 as of 2010.

== Geography ==
Parizh is located 26 kilometres (16 mi) north of Verkhniye Kigi (the district's administrative centre) by road. Nizhniye Kigi is the nearest rural locality.
