= Paris, Kansas =

Paris is the name of multiple locations in the U.S. state of Kansas:

- Paris, Lincoln County, Kansas
- Paris, Linn County, Kansas – former county seat, in Paris Township
- Paris Township, Kansas
