= Paris Township =

Paris Township may refer to:

- Paris Township, Edgar County, Illinois
- Paris Township, Howard County, Iowa
- Paris Township, Linn County, Kansas
- Paris Township, Michigan, in Huron County
- Paris Township, Kent County, Michigan, now the city of Kentwood
- Paris Township, Stutsman County, North Dakota, in Stutsman County, North Dakota
- Paris Township, Portage County, Ohio
- Paris Township, Stark County, Ohio
- Paris Township, Union County, Ohio
