= Sam Mangwana =

Congolese singer (born 1945)

- Born: Samuel Domingos Mangwana; 21 February 1945 (age 81); Leopoldville, Belgian Congo (present-day Kinshasa, Democratic Republic of the Congo)
- Genres: Congolese rumba; soukous
- Occupations: Singer; songwriter; bandleader
- Instrument: Vocals
- Years active: 1963–present
- Formerly of: African Fiesta; Orchestre Vox Africa; African Fiesta National; Festival des Maquisards; Orchestre Afrizam; TPOK Jazz; Orchestre Afrisa International; African All Stars
- Website: sam-mangwana.com

Samuel Domingos Mangwana (born 21 February 1945), known professionally as Sam Mangwana, is a Congolese-born singer, born to Angolan parents. He sings in Lingala, Kikongo, Bambara, Swahili, French, English, Portuguese, and Spanish. He was the frontman of his bands Festival des Maquisards and African All Stars. Mangwana was a member of François Luambo Makiadi's seminal band TPOK Jazz, and Tabu Ley Rochereau's bands African Fiesta, African Fiesta National and Afrisa International.

Mangwana uses his music to address corruption and violence, and his popularity, often described as "Mangwana fever", has spread across the continent from West to East, through Central Africa, and into Southern Africa.

== Life and career ==
=== 1945–early 1960s: Early life in a migrant Angolan family in Belgian Congo ===
Samuel Domingos Mangwana was born on 21 February 1945 in Léopoldville, Belgian Congo (now Kinshasa, Democratic Republic of the Congo), to Kongo Angolan parents. In an interview with the online music magazine Pan African Music, he explained that many Angolan families migrated to the Belgian Congo during the colonial period in search of better educational and economic opportunities. According to Mangwana, his parents were part of a larger wave of Angolan migrants who settled in the Belgian Congo during the 1920s. Since non-Congolese residents were generally excluded from positions in the colonial administration, many immigrants from Portuguese Angola, French Congo, French Sudan, and French Guinea turned to small businesses and trade. Angolan migrants, in particular, became active in the agri-food trade and other commercial enterprises.

Mangwana's first exposure to music came through a Salvation Army missionary school. In 1958, at the age of 13, he joined the choir of the normaliens, students training to become teachers. Due to his high-pitched voice, he was selected to lead singing during church services and cultural events. He was later sent to a boarding school about 40 kilometers from Léopoldville. Although the school offered favorable educational opportunities, Mangwana often faced prejudice because of his Angolan background. He later recalled in Pan African Music that Angolan pupils were often ridiculed and disparagingly referred to as "Portuguese slaves". Classmates would also call him "Salazar", a reference to Portuguese dictator António de Oliveira Salazar.

After an altercation with another student, school authorities decided that Mangwana would complete the remainder of the academic year in Portuguese Angola in 1959. After his arrival, he spent time with relatives in his father's native region before working on family-owned coffee plantations. During this period, he learned about coffee cultivation and harvesting. He also witnessed firsthand the harsh conditions faced by many Angolans under Portuguese colonial rule. Mangwana described several experiences, such as the mistreatment of family members by colonial authorities, which contributed to his rejection of Portuguese colonial culture and shaped his political views during his youth.

=== Early 1960s–1964: Return to Belgian Congo, African Fiesta, exploitation and exile ===
After returning to the Belgian Congo, he became involved in a union of exiled agricultural workers while still a student. In 1962, at the age of 17, he met Tabu Ley Rochereau through his friend Simon, known as "Englebert". Simon worked at the Athénée Royal de Kalina, where Tabu Ley was employed as head secretary in addition to his musical career. The institution was considered one of the colony's most prestigious schools that was attended by white students, Black students, and members of the Congolese upper class. Aware of his friend's interest in music, Simon introduced him to the singer, and during their first meeting, Tabu Ley asked Mangwana to perform a song from African Fiesta's repertoire. Seized by his voice, Tabu Ley recorded a demo and invited guitarist Dr. Nico Kasanda to assess his talent. After listening to the recording, Nico agreed that he should join the band.

Mangwana quickly began rehearsing with African Fiesta and made his stage debut with African Fiesta at the popular music venue Petit Bois in Léopoldville. The performance was well received; however, his decision to pursue a musical career caused friction within his family. His father, a devout Protestant and strict social democrat, strongly opposed the idea of his eldest son becoming a professional musician and instead hoped he would train as an economist in anticipation of Angola's future independence. Despite these expectations, Mangwana chose music, later recalling to music journalist François Bensignor that the opportunity was too compelling to pass up. The choice heightened internal family disputes and later helped precipitate his parents' divorce. When he left home to perform with African Fiesta, his father reported him missing to the authorities because he had not yet reached adulthood. Police were instructed to locate him, forcing him to move between different residences with the assistance of Rochereau and the band's supporters. Mangwana was eventually detained and taken to a local police station. Authorities informed him that his father wished to send him to a reformatory school. Tabu Ley intervened on his behalf and met with the police commissioner overseeing the case. Since Mangwana's father did not appear to complete the necessary paperwork, the commissioner released him and advised Tab Ley to make arrangements until he became 18 years old. After his release, Mangwana continued performing with African Fiesta, but he left the group less than a year later, as conditions for young musicians were unstable and uncertain. Most members were already established artists, whereas he remained relatively inexperienced within the professional music scene. Although he had been promised promised remuneration, payment was not forthcoming. In practice, musicians often relied on informal contributions from audiences to meet basic subsistence needs. Coming from a comparatively stable family background, Mangwana found these conditions increasingly untenable and grew progressively disillusioned.

During this period, Ignace Moleka, the proprietor of the venue where African Fiesta performed and an acquaintance of Mangwana's father, became indirectly involved. On one occasion, Mangwana's mother encountered him before a concert and inquired about his circumstances. He told her that he was hungry. She purchased provisions for him, including corned beef and chikwangue. After learning more about his situation, she consulted her son, who managed the venue. The bar owner confirmed that Mangwana had not been paid for several months of singing. Although he had been promised 40,000 Congolese francs, he had received nothing. The owner then decided that, from that night's earnings, 20,000 francs should be given to Mangwana. He also instructed that any other financial issues with Tabu Ley or Nico should be referred to him directly. After the concert, Mangwana's mother quietly gave him the money. When Tabu Ley and Nico later arrived to collect their share, they were informed of the arrangement and did not request the money back, but Mangwana still did not receive regular payment afterward, and the situation remained unchanged. Mangwana eventually became frustrated and accepted an offer from friends in Brazzaville to join a new orchestra called Los Patchichas. Shortly afterward, a government decree ordered members of certain Angolan liberation movements with socialist ties to leave Léopoldville. As Mangwana was affiliated with the Popular Movement for the Liberation of Angola (MPLA), he was forced to leave the city and relocate to Brazzaville. His father remained in Léopoldville due to his association with a different political movement linked to the National Liberation Front of Angola (FNLA). In Brazzaville, Mangwana was soon taken for military training and sent about 300 kilometers away for a three-month program. He was later deployed to the front in Cabinda, but he developed asthma due to the stress and conditions, and he was eventually demobilized. Political leaders advised him to return to music, telling him that "music is also a weapon". He thereafter resumed his musical career in Brazzaville, performing first with Los Patchichas and later with the Tembo orchestra.

=== 1965–1967: African Fiesta National, Orchestre Vox Africa, and song contest for Expo 67 ===
As early as 1965, sponsored by Daniel Loubelo "De la Lune" of TPOK Jazz, Mangwana became a member of SACEM to secure legal protection for his musical works at a time when few of his peers were concerned with copyright matters. That year, he received a letter from his father featuring an image of a shepherd searching for his sheep. He brought the letter to his political superiors, who advised him not to ignore his family ties and encouraged him to return home as the eldest son. Following this advice, he traveled back to Léopoldville by boat and returned to his father's household. At the same time, African Fiesta split into two rival factions as Tabu Ley renamed the band African Fiesta National, while Nico formed African Fiesta Sukisa. Shortly afterward, Nico approached Mangwana with a request to re-record certain compositions originally attributed to Tabu Ley but for which Mangwana's vocal contributions had been significant, so that proper credit could be given, as it was customary for band leaders to appropriate songwriting credit as a mechanism of hierarchical control or initiation into the group. Mangwana refused, stating that Tabu Ley had supported his early career and that he did not want to act against him. A few days later, Tabu Ley himself sent an emissary to call him back. Tabu Ley informed him that he was going on tour to Uganda and asked him to rejoin the group upon his return. After the tour, Mangwana rejoined African Fiesta National.

Salary concerns were a constant issue for musicians at the time. Even when performing with some of the country's leading orchestras, financial stability was not guaranteed. In 1967, he was contacted by Jeannot Bombenga, a former member of African Jazz who had formed Orchestre Vox Africa. Mangwana joined the group, noting that it had a more organized structure, with support from businessmen, civil servants, and patrons who aimed to improve conditions for musicians. The group also operated a publishing company, which operated as a form of production label at the time. By then, Mangwana had become popular in Kinshasa, partly because of his ability to sing in several languages, including Spanish, French, and Portuguese. He became one of the better-paid singers in the city and began using the nickname "Sam Moreno". He later accepted Bombenga's offer to join Orchestre Vox Africa.

A few months after his arrival, preparations began in the Congo for the Organization of African Unity (OAU) summit, scheduled to take place in Kinshasa. As part of the preparations, the Ministry of Culture organized a competition for an official song under the theme Congo Nouveau, Afrique nouvelle ("New Congo, New Africa"). The winning song would also represent the country at Expo 67 in Montreal. The competition brought together several major bands such as African Fiesta National, Orchestre Vox Africa, and Négro-Succès, which included Bavon Marie-Marie. The contest was held at the Kinshasa Zoological Garden. Although Tabu Ley won the competition, the song he performed with Orchestre Vox Africa, remained popular on radio and was used as the theme music for news broadcasts. Tabu Ley had also composed a politically themed French-language song, and he decided that he needed Mangwana for the international presentation in Montreal. Instead of contacting him directly, Tabu Ley went through the Ministry of Culture, which arranged for Mangwana to be officially assigned to the delegation. When Mangwana learned of this, two vehicles from the Ministry of the Interior arrived after a concert to take him. However, he left the venue before they could meet him. He was later found at home with singer Ntesa Dalienst when officials arrived. They identified themselves using a loudspeaker and informed him that he was being taken on an official mission. Mangwana came down and agreed to go with them. He was taken to the airport with little preparation, wearing only jeans and a nylon shirt. On arrival in Brussels, an embassy representative provided him with proper clothing before he continued to Montreal. In Montreal, he was met by Roger Izeidi, Tabu Ley's associate and manager of African Fiesta National, who took him to the hotel. There, he saw Tabu Ley, but the two did not speak that evening. The next day, the group manager explained to Mangwana that his participation was part of an official cultural mission. He reminded him that although he was of Angolan origin, he was born in the Congo and had been trained there as a musician, and therefore represented the country abroad. He added that any personal disagreements could be set aside until after the mission. Tabu Ley later visited Mangwana in his room. He greeted him and encouraged him to focus on the opportunity to perform and develop his career. After this discussion, they reconciled and resumed working together. The group then rehearsed and performed in Montreal and Québec City. After the tour, they stopped in Brussels, where they recorded several songs before returning to Kinshasa.

=== 1967–1971: Return to African Fiesta National, Festival des Maquisards, and Festival de Sam ===
Mangwana again became a full member of African Fiesta National. In Kinshasa, the band was scheduled to perform at a New Year's Eve event in 1967. Before the concert, Tabu Ley arranged for the group to perform at the home of the Minister of the Interior. The minister had previously supported Tabu Ley by requesting a song for his child and helping finance a recording trip to Brussels, and the performance was intended as a gesture of thanks. After this private engagement, the group was expected to perform at a public event in the city, but complications materialized when President Mobutu Sese Seko arrived at the scheduled public venue and found that African Fiesta National had not yet appeared. He then left the event, and the next day, the group was suspended from performing for three months. After one month, then two months without activity or payment, Mangwana and several other musicians raised concerns. Although their recordings made in Brussels were performing well, they had not received royalties or payment for their work. Their complaints were rejected by the production team.

Demoralized by the situation, Mangwana chose to leave and, together with guitarist and singer-songwriter Jean-Paul Vangu Diakanua (also known as Guivano or Guvano), formed the band Festival des Maquisards, which soon expanded to include several prominent figures in Congolese music, including Lokombe Bola Bolite, Dizzy Mandjeku, Jean Bokosa "Johnny", Michelino Mavatiku Visi, Diana, and Ntesa Dalienst. At the start, they did not have instruments or equipment. They then turned to Denis Ilosono, a former private secretary to Mobutu and a longtime acquaintance of Mangwana. Ilosono welcomed Mangwana and asked his staff to check whether unused instruments from Négro-Succès were still available. The instruments were found in usable condition, and the group was given a rehearsal space in Limete. Around this time, Ilosono asked Mangwana to write a song for the birthday celebration of his twin children. The performance was well-received, with the audience demanding multiple encores. Buoyed by the reception, Ilosono financed studio sessions and additional recordings while also planning a future trip to Brussels for Mangwana to acquire new equipment. The band attracted large audiences. Vocalist Lolo became known for performing pop music and imitating James Brown, while Mangwana performed styles inspired by artists such as Pete "El Conde" Rodríguez and Monguito. Festival des Maquisards also included a Caribbean-influenced repertoire, featuring biguines and Cape Verdean ballads, as well as international popular music, including songs by Michel Sardou, Johnny Hallyday, and Alain Barrière. Many Haitian professionals working in Kinshasa, including teachers, doctors, and magistrates, attended the band's concerts, and their support helped increase Festival des Maquisards' popularity.

Their debut single became a commercial hit. After its release, Mangwana was informed that the band had earned significant revenue and that Ilosono wanted to know how he planned to use the money. Mangwana initially responded that the money belonged to him. However, as the group was competing with other orchestras, he proposed buying nine Vespa scooters and two cars, one for himself and one for the bandleader, with scooters for the other musicians. Denis responded by saying, through a phone call, that the cheque would be given to Mangwana's father instead. When Mangwana was informed of this, he objected, saying that if his father controlled the money, he would also control his performances. Hearing this, Ilosono decided to release the funds directly, commenting that musicians often created difficulties. Instead of issuing a cheque, Ilosono arranged for the purchase of the vehicles directly, using the Festival des Maquisards' earnings, which amounted to about 2,800 zaïres, a large sum at the time, when a car cost between 300 and 400 zaïres. Les Maquisards then became one of the first bands in Kinshasa to have its own transport. The musicians would often travel together through the city before performances that turned their movement into a form of public promotion.

Among the band's most notable releases in 1969 was a 45 rpm record featuring Mangwana's first smash hit "Zela Ngai Nasala" on the A-side, which addressed themes of struggle, ambition, and emotional insecurity tied to poverty and earned Mangwana recognition as Best Songwriter of the Year, and "Congo Ya M.P.R." on the B-side, which aligned with the Mobutu regime's propaganda promoting the state ideology of Authenticité. Later that year, however, Festival des Maquisards faced a major crisis following Ilosono's arrest by state security services and the confiscation of the band's instruments during a tour in Mbuji-Mayi in Kasaï Oriental. Stranded, the musicians attempted to return to Kinshasa on their own, with only Mangwana and Guivano managing to return while the remaining members were left behind. The crisis, together with internal disputes, led to the band's dissolution. Guivano went on to form Orchestra Dua, Mangwana briefly continued under the name Festival de Sam, Lokombe resumed his government position, and Diana rejoined African Fiesta National. While some sources, including music critic Zéphyrin Nkumu Assana Kirika, date the dissolution to 2 September 1969, others such as Samuel Malonga Nkilutomba Luba Mabitidi suggest it happened in July of that year. Mangwana's time with Festival de Sam was short-lived, as he would eventually dissolved the group.

=== 1972–1978: TPOK Jazz, Orchestre Afrizam, Orchestre Afrisa International, and African All Stars ===
In 1972, TPOK Jazz, led by Franco Luambo, was performing at the Vis-à-Vis Bar, an open-air venue in Kalamu. Mangwana was outside the venue, watching the performance with a friend from behind the railings. During a break, Franco noticed him and asked Jean-Jean whether the man outside was the former African Fiesta National singer. Jean-Jean confirmed it was indeed Mangwana and asked why he was not inside. Mangwana replied that he was wearing sandals and felt inappropriately dressed to enter. Franco found this unusual and invited him to his office the next day, and when they met, he told Mangwana he was part of the musical family and should speak openly if problems arose. Mangwana then explained his situation. Franco exhorted him to stay committed and not abandon Tabu Ley, whom he described as a strong mentor. He reassured him, gave him financial support, and invited him to stay in contact. As a gesture of support and appreciation for his talent, Franco deposited 20,000 francs into an account for him. After this encounter, Mangwana joined the band and often took lead vocals on hits such as Franco's "Où est le sérieux" (1973) and guitarist Simaro Lutumba's "Ebale ya Zaire" (1973), "Cedou" (1973), "Inoussa" (1973), "Ntotu" (1974), "Minuit Eleki Lezi" (1974), "Luka Mobali Moko" (1974), and "Toyeba Yo" (1976).

According to the Danish radio journalist, African popular music historian, and archivist Flemming Harrev, Mangwana briefly joined Orchestre Afrizam in 1973 while still a member of TPOK Jazz, after being invited by former African Fiesta National vocalist "Pépé" Ndombe Opetum to join the newly formed band. They recorded several songs, as well as several tracks credited to Mangwana as a solo artist. The collaboration also brought him together with saxophonist Empompo Loway and Pépé Ndombe, during which he acquired the nickname "Muana Nzoku" ("son of the elephant").

After Angola gained independence in 1975, Mangwana sought to create a music organization in Luanda modeled after Franco's enterprise. Franco supported the idea and agreed to serve as its sponsor. To lay the groundwork, Mangwana made frequent visits to Angola and publicly advocated for the MPLA, but these ambitions were ultimately derailed by the onset of the Angolan Civil War. He also revived an earlier Portuguese-language liberation song, "Mia Angola", which was later retitled "Liberdade T Terra". The song's popularity led the Angolan government to award him the title of Artista Nacional ("national artist"). That year, Mangwana signed an agreement with Tabu Ley's Orchestre Afrisa International to perform in a series of concerts in Kinshasa. Founded in 1970, the band's name, Afrisa, is a portmanteau of "Africa" and "Éditions Isa", Tabu Ley's record label. Recordings made with Tabu Ley during this period were released with his name receiving equal billing alongside that of his mentor. Despite these successes, he faced rivalry and "jealousy" from fellow musicians in Kinshasa, and, in search of better prospects, Mangwana left Zaire in 1976 after departing TPOK Jazz and Orchestre Afrisa International and traveling to Nigeria with hopes of recording and performing there. When conditions proved unfavorable, he relocated to Benin and turned to producer Gérard Akweson for support. While in Cotonou, he performed with the Orchestre Poly-Rythmo de Cotonou to earn a living. Akweson later arranged his transfer to Togo, where he was warmly received and offered opportunities to perform.

Encouraged by Akweson, Mangwana later relocated to Abidjan in Côte d'Ivoire. There, he took part in a televised appearance with Gnonnas Pedro's band Gnonnas Pedro Y Sus Pancho De Cotonou before the latter embarked on a Niger tour. The exposure helped him obtain a recording deal from a Nigerian producer. During this period, he reunited with lead guitarist Dizzy Mandjeku, who collaborated with him on new recordings. Together with singer Théo Blaise Kounkou, the trio formed a band called Amida, which was intended to "modernize" traditional Zairean folklore. According to Chris Stapleton and Chris May in African All-Stars: The Pop Music of a Continent (1987), the venture failed to achieve its objectives and was succeeded by the formation of African All Stars in 1978. They were later joined by several prominent musicians, including rhythm guitarist Lokassa Ya Mbongo, drummer Ringo Moya, Cameroonian bassist Roland Mvogo, Nyboma, Syran Mbenza, and Bopol Mansiamina. Before the band's official formation, they released the four-track LP Les Champions in 1977, which was issued by the Abidjan-based label Discophone and distributed by Badmos International Records, owned by Beninese producer Gbadamassi Raimi ("Badmos"). The record featured Mangwana's "Les Champions", Mandjeku's "Ata Bassali Nakozonga", Lokassa's "Makengo", and Kanyama Moya Lotula's "Kanyama Moya Lotula". Their music centered on soukous, which they blended with highlife, Afrobeat, and especially biguine to develop a distinctive Afro-Antillean crossover sound. French-language lyrics, occasionally punctuated with English phrases, helped broaden their music's appeal. Inspired by Dechaud's "African Jazz Mokili Mobimba", the title track references figures such as producer Badmos, Nigerian pop stars Sonny Okosun, Fela Kuti, and Prince Nico Mbarga, as well as radio personality Georges Collinet.

In 1978, the group followed up with Georgette Eckins, a four-track LP produced by Adios Records and distributed by Adaramola Records. The title track wryly recounts a story of unrequited love, with Mangwana narrating his repeated romantic disappointments in French while the band playfully echoes and comments on his misfortunes. Musically, the song is driven by Ringo Moya's crisp hi-hat work and Roland Mvogo's steady bassline, complemented by the interwoven guitar lines of Mandjeku and Lokassa, reminiscent of Docteur Nico's merengue style. A horn section adds texture to the groove, which stretches for nearly ten minutes before concluding with a melodic reference to Manuel d'Oliveira's "Maria Tchebo". Although "Georgette Eckins" became the session's breakout success and even gained popularity in Zaire, the record's more up-tempo tracks built around the emerging "new beat" were more influential on African popular music.

=== 1978–1979: From "Suzana Coulibaly" to African All Stars' breakup and dispute ===
As the African All Stars' reputation grew, they relocated to Lomé, Togo, where operating costs were lower and financial support came from Beninese businessman Alhadji Albarika. They acquired modern equipment and organized a series of concerts along the familiar route stretching from Accra to Lagos, a circuit that Les Bantous de la Capitale had toured years earlier. While in Ghana at the beginning of 1979, the group entered Ambassador Records' studio in Kumasi to record new material. The session produced their breakout hit, "Suzana Coulibaly", from the eponymous album. The song retained the appeal of "Georgette Eckins" while embracing the propulsive character of the emerging "new beat". Mangwana again drew on personal experiences, singing about a wife who squandered his earnings on other men. The arrangement "stripped the sebene down to a race between Lokassa's rhythm guitar and Moya's wood block and high-hat combination", which created a hypnotic groove that energized audiences. During the song, Mangwana coined the phrase "soukous sophistiqué" to describe the emerging sound. As the band was riding high with "Georgette Eckins" near the end of 1978, more Zairian musicians left Kinshasa in search of the greater opportunities and prosperity that West Africa seemed to offer. Bopol Mansiamina of Ya Tupas arrived in Lomé together with former members of Vicky Longomba's Lovy du Zaïre and its successor, Orchestre Kara, including guitarists Syran Mbenza and Pablo Lubadika. Shortly after their arrival, Mangwana invited them to join the African All Stars.

Although the group appeared to be flourishing, internal tensions were beginning to emerge. After recording their final four-track album, Matinda, in Lagos, the band fragmented, with Mangwana, Mbenza, Mansiamina, and Lubadika relocated to Abidjan, while Mandjeku, Lokassa, and Moya remained in Lomé. Mvogo had already left, and Théo Blaise Kounkou opted to pursue an independent career. In an interview conducted in late August, Mangwana explained that he had ended his association with the African All Stars because some members had entered into commitments with the owner of the group's instruments, whose business practices he found unacceptable. He added that he was in the process of creating his own band. Mandjeku publicly challenged this account in a letter to Elima, claiming that Mangwana had been sent to Abidjan to negotiate pressing and distribution agreements for the group's two latest LPs but had never provided a financial accounting or shared any proceeds from the releases. One explanation for the dispute focused on ownership of the band's equipment. Under an agreement with Albarika, the musicians were expected to produce four albums annually over four years, after which the instruments would become their property. Because Mangwana was not an instrumentalist, his role within that arrangement remained unclear and became a source of contention. Mandjeku later suggested that the disagreement mirrored differences in vision, with Mangwana preferring a flexible collective that would assemble for recordings and occasional performances without the costs of maintaining a permanent band, whereas he favored a stable and long-lasting band structure.

Although the African All Stars existed for little more than a year, they recorded enough material for eight albums, produced two major hit singles and several additional successes, and helped shape a new direction in Congolese popular music. After the split, each faction attempted to continue using the African All Stars name for live performances. Mandjeku recruited singer Nyboma and lead guitarist Germain Ndala "Dally" Kimoko from Orchestre Kamalé, the successor to Lipua Lipua, and brought them to Lomé to work with his version of the group. Mangwana, meanwhile, performed with a constantly changing lineup that included singer Lea Lignanzi from the Central African Republic and Brazzaville guitarist Michel Moumpala. He also helped establish the MAM System A Music label, which enabled partnerships with local producers and expanded his presence in the West African music industry. During this period, he filled Paris's Bataclan concert hall for four consecutive weekends. Although records released under the African All Stars banner continued to sell into the early 1980s, the original African All Stars had effectively come to an end. Worsening conditions in Zaire had weakened the country's music industry, but they had not destroyed it. The musicians, producers, and distributors in the business proved too resourceful to allow government greed and incompetence to deprive them of their livelihoods. While many artists chose to leave the country, many others remained at home.

== Solo career ==
Mangwana became a solo artist shortly after African All Stars disbanded. He recorded and toured with varying combinations of musicians. Maria Tebbo (1980) with remnants of the All Stars, Coopération (1982) with Franco, Canta Moçambique (1983) with Mandjeku, and albums with saxophonist Empompo Loway under the names Tiers Monde Coopération and Tiers Monde Révolution were highlights of his career in the 1980s.

Due to his frequent goings and comings, he won the nickname "pigeon voyageur" (travelling pigeon). In the 2000s, Mangwana spent most of his time in Angola, emerging periodically to perform concerts in Europe.

== Band memberships ==
- African Fiesta (1962)
- African Fiesta National (1965)
- Orchestre Vox Africa (1967)
- African Fiesta National (1967)
- Festival des Maquisards (1968)
- Orchestre Afrizam (1970)
- TPOK Jazz (1972)
- Orchestre Afrisa International (1976)
- African All Stars (1978)

== Discography ==
- African All Stars: Les Champions (1977)
- Sam Mangwana et l'African All Stars: Georgette Eckins (1978)
- Théo-Blaise Kounkou et l'African All Stars: Zenaba (1978)
- Sam Mangwana et l'African All Stars: International Sam Mangwana (1979)
- Waka Waka (1978)
- Maria Tebbo (1979)
- Georgette Eckins (1979)
- Matinda (1979)
- Affaire Disco (1981)
- Est-ce Que Tu Moyens? (1981)
- Cooperation (1982)
- Affaire Video (1982)
- N'Simba Eli (1982)
- Bonne Annee 1983
- In Nairobi (1984)
- Aladji (1987)
- For Ever (1989)
- Lukolo (1989)
- Capita General (1990)
- Megamix (July 1990)
- Rumba Music (1993)
- No Me Digas No (1995)
- Galo Negro (1998)
- Sam Mangwana Sings Dino Vangu (2000)
- Volume 1 Bilinga Linga 1968/1969 (June 2000)
- Volume 2 Eyebana 1980/1984 (June 2000)
- Very Best of 2001 (March 2001)
- Cantos de Esperanca (April 2003)
- Lubamba (2016)

With TPOK Jazz

- Lufua Lua Nkadi - Sung by Sam Mangwana, Michel Boyibanda, Josky Kiambukuta and Lola Checain in 1972.
- Luka Mobali Moko -Sung by Sam Mangwana, Josky Kiambukuta, Michèl Boyibanda and Lola Chécain, in 1974.

Contributing artist

- The Rough Guide to Congo Gold (2008, World Music Network)
