= Dan Storper =

American businessman (1951–2025)

Dan Mitchell Storper (May 20, 1951 – May 22, 2025) was an American music executive who was the founder and CEO of the record label Putumayo World Music.

== Early life ==
Storper was born in Manhattan, New York City, on May 20, 1951, and grew up in Great Neck, New York.

=== Education ===
Storper was a recipient of a New York State Regents Scholarship and also an athlete and musician. He started at third base for Great Neck South High School's varsity baseball team and played varsity tennis in college. Majoring in Latin American Studies at Washington University in St. Louis, he graduated in 1973.

=== Business ===
The young Storper began to hone his entrepreneurial skills by trading coins and antiques while in junior high and high school. He also earned money by playing the piano at restaurants and other local venues. As a college student he set up a store in his dorm providing the usual necessities of dorm life such as toiletries and ordering LP's at substantial savings to his fellow dormmates. After graduating, he traveled to Colombia, Ecuador, Peru and Bolivia to visit the countries he had studied. Putumayo World Music, named after the valley of the Putumayo River in Colombia where he had visited, began as a hole-in the-wall retail store in New York City in 1975. The shop sold handcrafts and clothing collected in Latin America. It received considerable media attention and by 1985 Storper found himself designing ethnic-inspired contemporary clothing and supplying 600 other stores. Putumayo also had three successful New York stores.

== Switch to music ==
In 1991, Storper was deeply impacted by world music when he happened upon a live concert of Kotoja, an African band led by Babá Ben Okulolo in the San Francisco Bay area and became involved with this compelling music, putting together Putumayo's first two world music collections in 1993. That same year, Storper was joined by his long-time friend Michael Kraus, who helped him launch the label.

After selling the Putumayo stores in 1997, Storper was able to focus full-time on his goal of introducing people to other cultures through great world music. He traveled extensively and, with the support of ethnomusicologist Jacob Edgar (founder of Cumbancha) paid attention to the music scenes in Paris, Rio de Janeiro, New Orleans, Johannesburg and other music centers. The opening of Putumayo Europe, in Hilversum, Holland in 2000 enabled the company to connect with the European music and retail scene. The expansion of the label's International division has also extended Putumayo's presence in South America, Asia, Africa and Oceania. The company now has offices in 12 countries. Putumayo has sold more than 15 million CDs since it began, with 50 of its collections selling more than 100,000 copies each and several surpassing 300,000. Currently, more than 3500 specialty retailers in the U.S. and thousands more around the world sell Putumayo CDs.

Storper was also a judge for the 5th, 10th, and 11th annual Independent Music Awards to support independent artists' careers.

== Personal life and death ==
Storper had three children. He was married to Amy Sevante until they divorced in 2025.

Storper died of pancreatic cancer in New Orleans, on May 22, 2025, two days after his 74th birthday.
