= Congolese rumba =

Genre of African music and dance

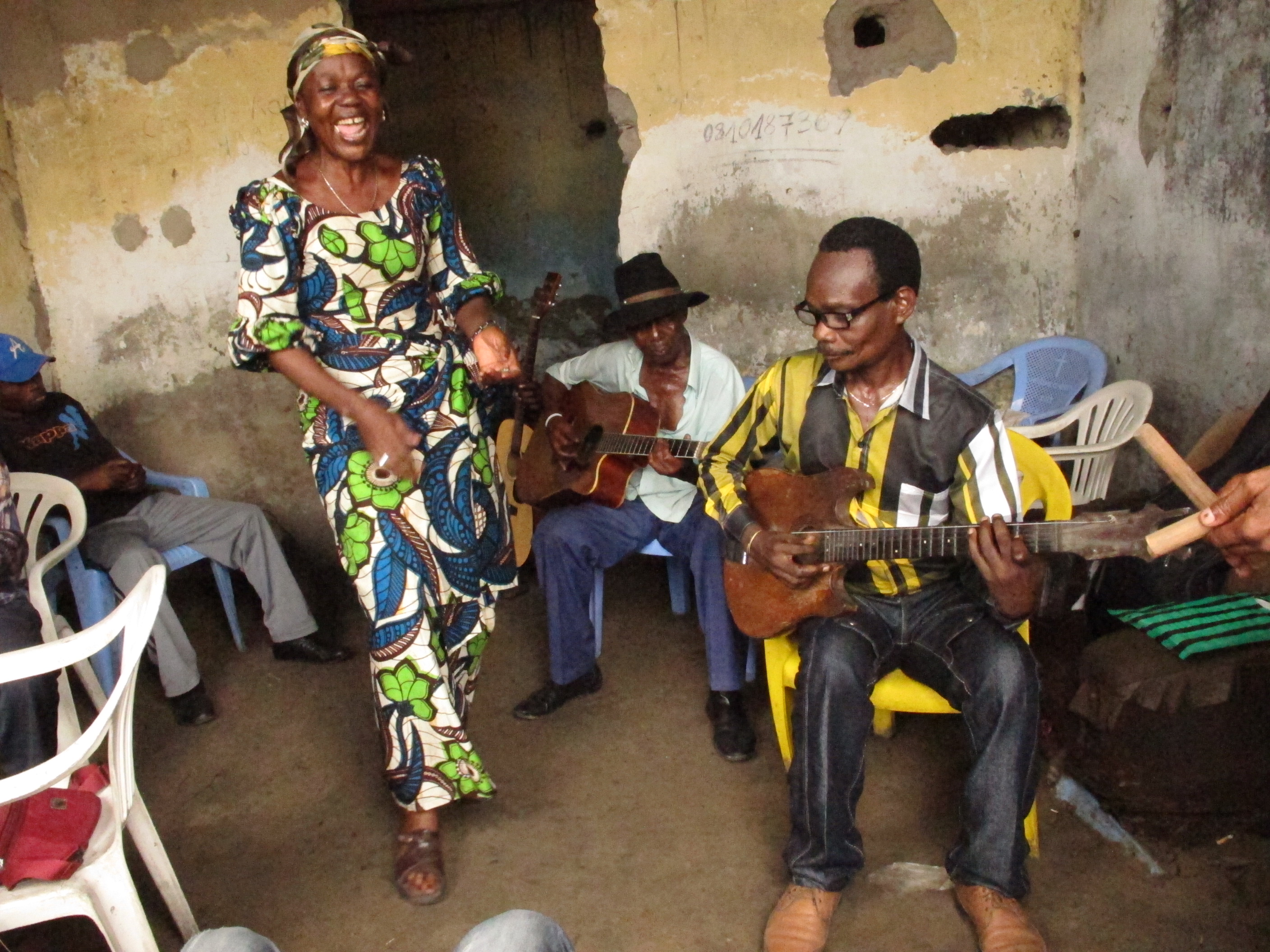
- Bakolo Music International, a Congolese rumba band during a rehearsal in Kinshasa
- Stylistic origins: Ethnogenesis: Kongolese maringa dance music; Exogenesis: Son cubano; African popular music
- Cultural origins: Late 1930s in the Congos (esp. Kinshasa and Brazzaville)
- Typical instruments: Guitar (esp. fingerstyle); bass (esp. acoustic); drums; brass; vocals
- Derivative forms: Soukous; ndombolo

Fusion genres
- Benga; makossa

Regional scenes
- Congolese sound (Kenya, Uganda, Tanzania)

Other topics
- Music of the Democratic Republic of the Congo

Congolese rumba
- UNESCO Intangible Cultural Heritage
- Country: Democratic Republic of the Congo and Republic of the Congo
- Reference: 01711
- Region: Africa

Inscription history
- Inscription: 2021 (16th session)
- List: Representative

Congolese rumba, also known as African rumba or Rumba Lingala, is a dance music genre originating in the modern-day Democratic Republic of the Congo (DRC) and Republic of the Congo and particularly in the cities of Kinshasa and Brazzaville. The rhythms, melodies, and lyrics of Congolese rumba have gained it global recognition and remains integral to African music heritage; UNESCO added it to its list of intangible cultural heritage in December 2021. Known for its rhythmic patterns, guitar solos, and emotive vocals—primarily performed in Lingala—the genre is defined by its multilayered, cyclical guitar riffs, a rhythm section anchored by electric bass and percussion, and the sebene. (Note: The sebene is a high-energy instrumental bridge, during which dancers and atalaku are most prominent in the performance.)

The Congolese rumba emerged in the mid-20th century during the colonial era. The genre's roots have been traced to the Bakongo partner dance music known as maringa, which was traditionally practiced within the former Kingdom of Loango, encompassing regions of contemporary Republic of the Congo, southern Gabon, and Cabinda Province of Angola. The style gained prominence in the 1920s–1940s, introducing "bar-dancing" culture in Brazzaville and Léopoldville (now Kinshasa), which incorporated distinctive elements such as a bass drum, a bottle employed as a triangle, and an accordion known as likembe. During the mid-1940s and 1950s, the influence of Cuban son bands transformed maringa into "Congolese rumba," as imported records by Sexteto Habanero, Trio Matamoros, and Los Guaracheros de Oriente were frequently misattributed as "rumba". The 1960s and 1970s saw the emergence of soukous, an urban dance music style derived from Congolese rumba, which emphasized lively rhythms, intricate high-pitched guitar melodies, and large brass and polyrhythmic percussion sections. Soukous gradually incorporated modern musical trends, paving the way for ndombolo, which emerged in the late 1990s and adopted contemporary production techniques, including synthesizers and digital sound technologies.

The style has gained popularity across central, eastern, southern, and western Africa—being called the "origin of all subsequent West African musical movements." Additionally, it has found a following in Europe, particularly in France, Belgium, Germany, and the United Kingdom, as well as in the United States, as a result of touring by Congolese musicians, who have performed at various festivals internationally. Musicians such as Paul Kamba, Henri Bowane, Wendo Kolosoy, Manuel d'Oliveira, Léon Bukasa, Franco Luambo Makiadi, Le Grand Kallé, TPOK Jazz, African Jazz, Beguen Band, Nico Kasanda, Verckys Kiamuangana Mateta, Tabu Ley Rochereau, Sam Mangwana, Papa Noël Nedule, Vicky Longomba, Zaïko Langa Langa, Papa Wemba, and Koffi Olomide have made significant contributions to the genre, pushing its boundaries and incorporating modern musical elements.

== Characteristics ==
=== Tempo and instrumental composition ===
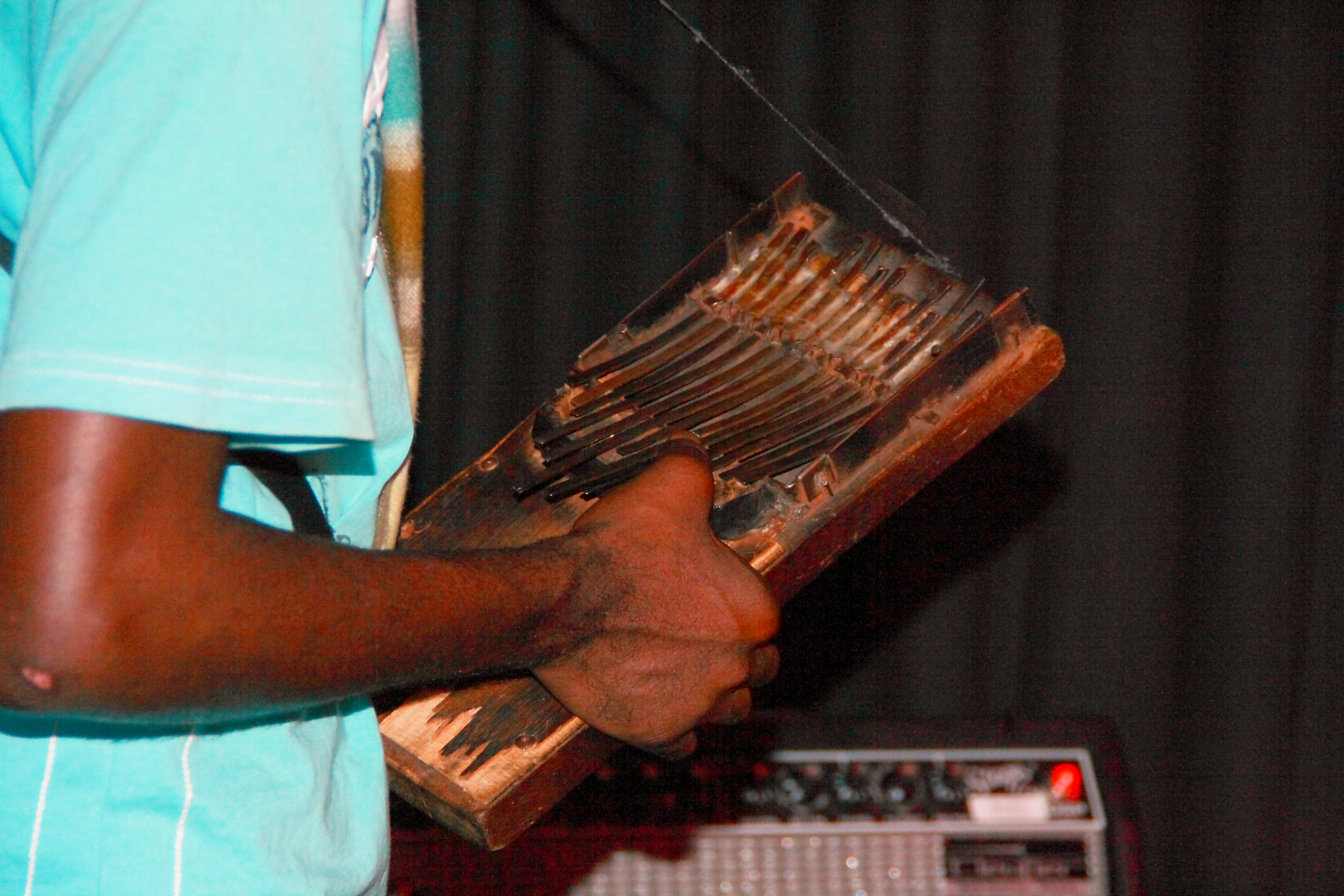
A member of the Kinshasa-based band Konono Nº1 playing the likembe, a traditional thumb piano.

The Congolese rumba is characterized by a slow-to-moderate tempo and syncopated arrangement of drums and percussion, typically following a 4/4 time signature. The genre's instrumentation has evolved over time. Initially, local tunes were concocted employing instruments such as the likembe, a bottle struck with a metal rod, and a small, skin-covered frame drum called patenge. However, in the 1920s, maringa bands supplanted the likembe with accordions and acoustic guitars. By the 1950s, bands expanded significantly. For instance, Manuel d'Oliveira and Les San Salvador (1952) utilized three guitars, a clarinet, and a scraper, while Antoine Wendo Kolosoy (1956) included three guitars, bass, maracas, and claves. By the mid-to-late 1950s, the instrumentation diversified further with "orchestres", or big bands, becoming the standard and incorporating upright basses, trumpets, saxophones, and more elaborate percussion setups. The contemporary Congolese rumba instrumental makeup primarily includes guitars, mandolins, banjos, drums, saxophones, clarinets, trumpets, maracas, pianos, shakers, double bells (ekonga), likembe, accordion, and racketts.

=== Guitars ===
In the late 1940s and 1950s, Congolese rumba guitars were typically tuned to a Hawaiian open tuning (D-G-D-G-B-D), with musicians employing a capo to alter keys, producing a buzzing effect highly esteemed in the genre. The lead guitar carries the primary melodic responsibility, executing intricate, high-register lines that require speed, precision, and nimble fingerwork high on the fretboard. During slower rumba or mid-tempo vocal sections, the lead guitarist performs free-flowing melodies in response to the singers, while the rhythm guitar maintains the basic cyclic pattern of the composition, and the mi-solo guitar occupies an intermediary role—its name, meaning "half-solo", denoting its role as a bridge between the high-pitched lead and low-pitched rhythm guitars. The bass guitar reinforces the clave beat and provides the harmonic framework for the ensemble.

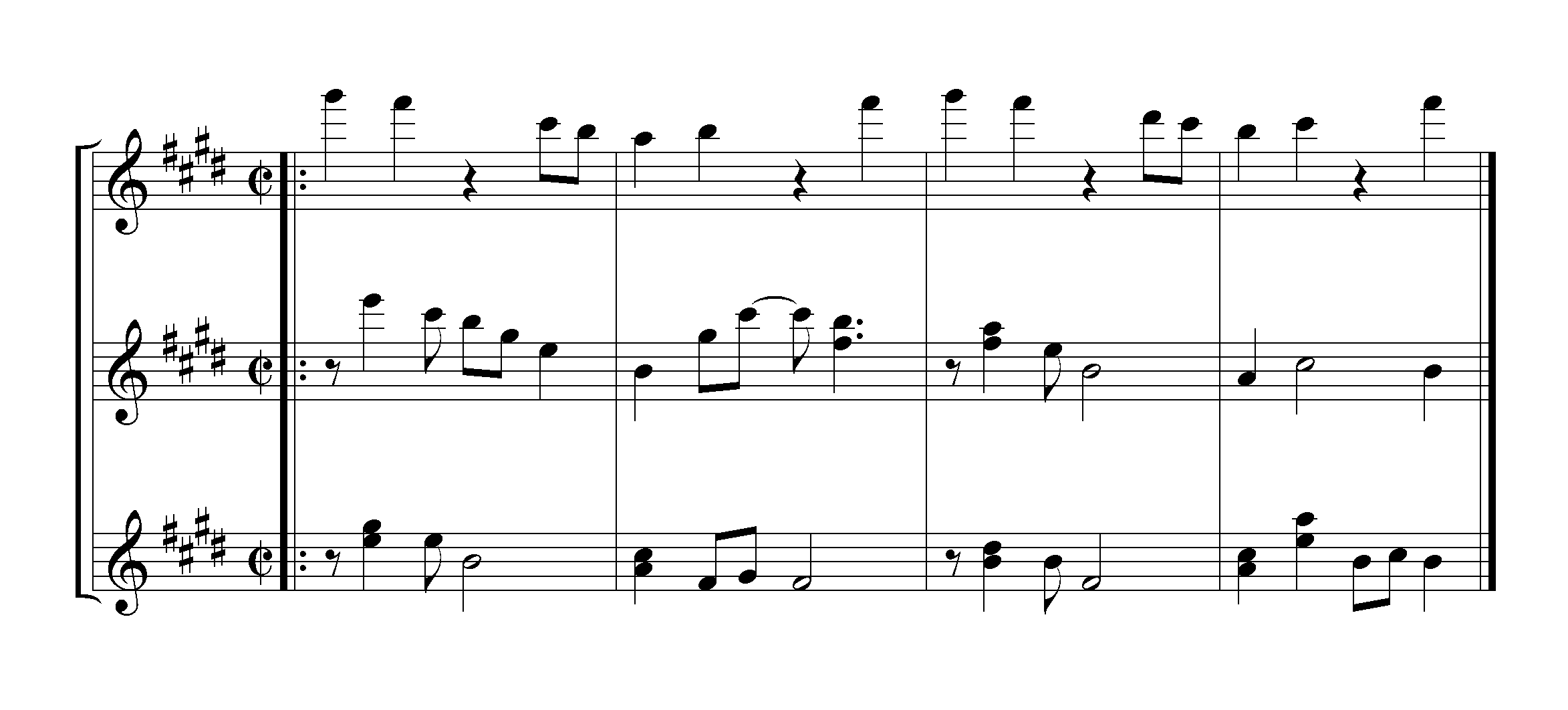
From top: the solo (lead) guitar, mi-solo (third) guitar, and accompaniment (rhythm) guitar.

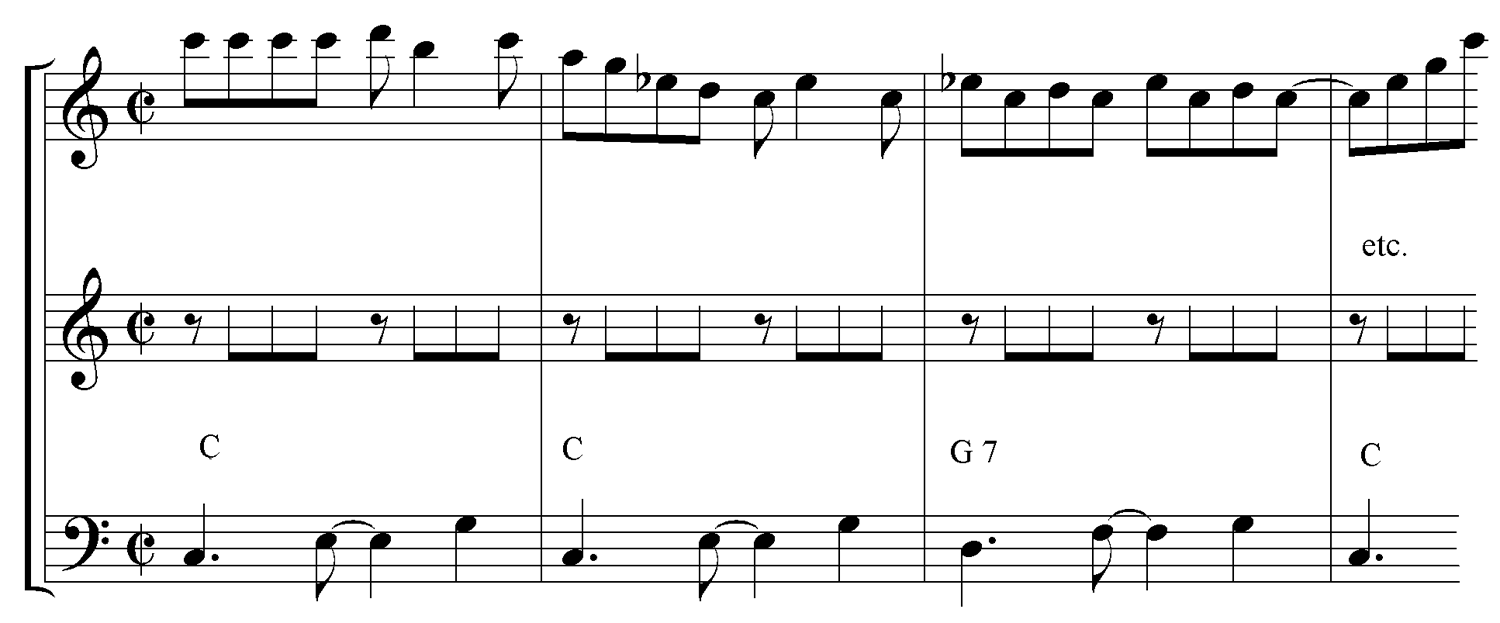
From top: lead guitar; rhythm guitar; bass guitar

Following the slower vocal sections, an instrumental interlude called the sebene introduces a rapid tempo and intensified guitar articulations, with the drummer using the cavacha pattern to drive the ensemble toward the high-energy conclusion. During the sebene, interlocking call-and-response patterns among the guitarists are essential, and all players adjust their parts according to the drummer's cues to complement the lead guitar, typically following the standard I–IV–V–IV Congolese progression. Variations on the diatonic major scale predominate, with the lead guitar often carrying the melody in the absence of vocals and occupying the highest register, while singers simultaneously transition to rhythmic chanting in the animation section, typically accompanied by atalaku performers, as the guitars assume greater prominence within the overall texture. The sebene motivates the audience to dance, and singers call out patrons' names during libanga, a practice of respect and encouragement that also promotes tipping.

=== Musical structure ===
A prototypical Congolese rumba composition begins with a slow, vocal-centered introduction, and transitions into the sebene, which provides space for interactive musical dialogue among singers, guitars, and other instruments, while atalaku performers interject rhythmic exclamations and cues to enhance the communal energy of the performance. In his dissertation "La Musique comme Rapport aux temps, Chroniques et diachroniques des musiques urbaines congolaises", David Nadeau-Bernatchez traces the connections between Congolese rumba and traditional Congolese music. Drawing on the work of Alan P. Merriam, he notes that Bantu music is generally built around binary rhythms in which vocal melodies are accompanied by instruments, a structure that is also found throughout Congolese rumba. Additional characteristics include repetitive lyrics, strong contrasts between verses and choruses, and the frequent use of improvisation. Evidence of these traditions can be heard in Zacharie Elenga's 1951 song "Amis Benatar", which demonstrates how Congolese rumba remained linked to traditional music. The guitar marked by lower-pitched tones is prominent from the beginning of the song, though its sound is deeper and less metallic than that found in later rumba recordings.

Vocal harmonies are typically arranged in thirds, with occasional octaves or fifths employed for special effects. The genre often incorporates three types of call-and-response interactions: between singer and chorus, between singer and instrument, and among different instrumental sections. This interplay, combined with a mix of homophony and polyrhythm, creates a rich, textured sound. Melodic interest usually centers on a single part, supported by subordinate accompaniment, while the rhythmic texture is dense and varied across instruments. Horns often punctuate rather than carry the melodic line, except when "used antiphonally with the lead singer or chorus". Improvisation in Congolese rumba is generally motif-based, involving variations on themes, often utilizing intervals like thirds and sixths. Performances are typically delivered in French, Lingala, Swahili, Spanish, Kikongo, and Tshiluba. The vocal delivery encompasses a wide range of expressive modalities, such as vibrato, falsetto, and melismatic ornamentations.

== History ==
=== Origins ===
A proposed etymology for the term "rumba" is that it derives from the Kikongo word nkumba, meaning "belly button", denoting the native dance practiced within the former Kingdom of Congo, encompassing parts of the present-day Democratic Republic of the Congo, Republic of the Congo, and Angola. Its rhythmic foundation draws from Bantu traditions, notably the Palo Kongo religion, which traces back to the Kongo people who were unceremoniously transported to Cuba by Spanish settlers in the 16th century.

Miguel Ángel Barnet Lanza's treatise On Congo Cults of Bantu Origin in Cuba explains that the majority of enslaved Africans brought to Cuba were initially of Bantu lineage, although later, the Yoruba from Nigeria became dominant. The musical traditions, dance forms, and spiritual practices were covertly preserved across generations within regions characterized by significant populations of enslaved Africans. Musical instruments like the conga, makuta, catá, yambu, claves, and güiro were used to craft a musical dialogue that engaged in call and response with ancestral spirits and the deceased. Notable figures like Arsenio Rodríguez blended traditional Bakongo sounds with Cuban son.

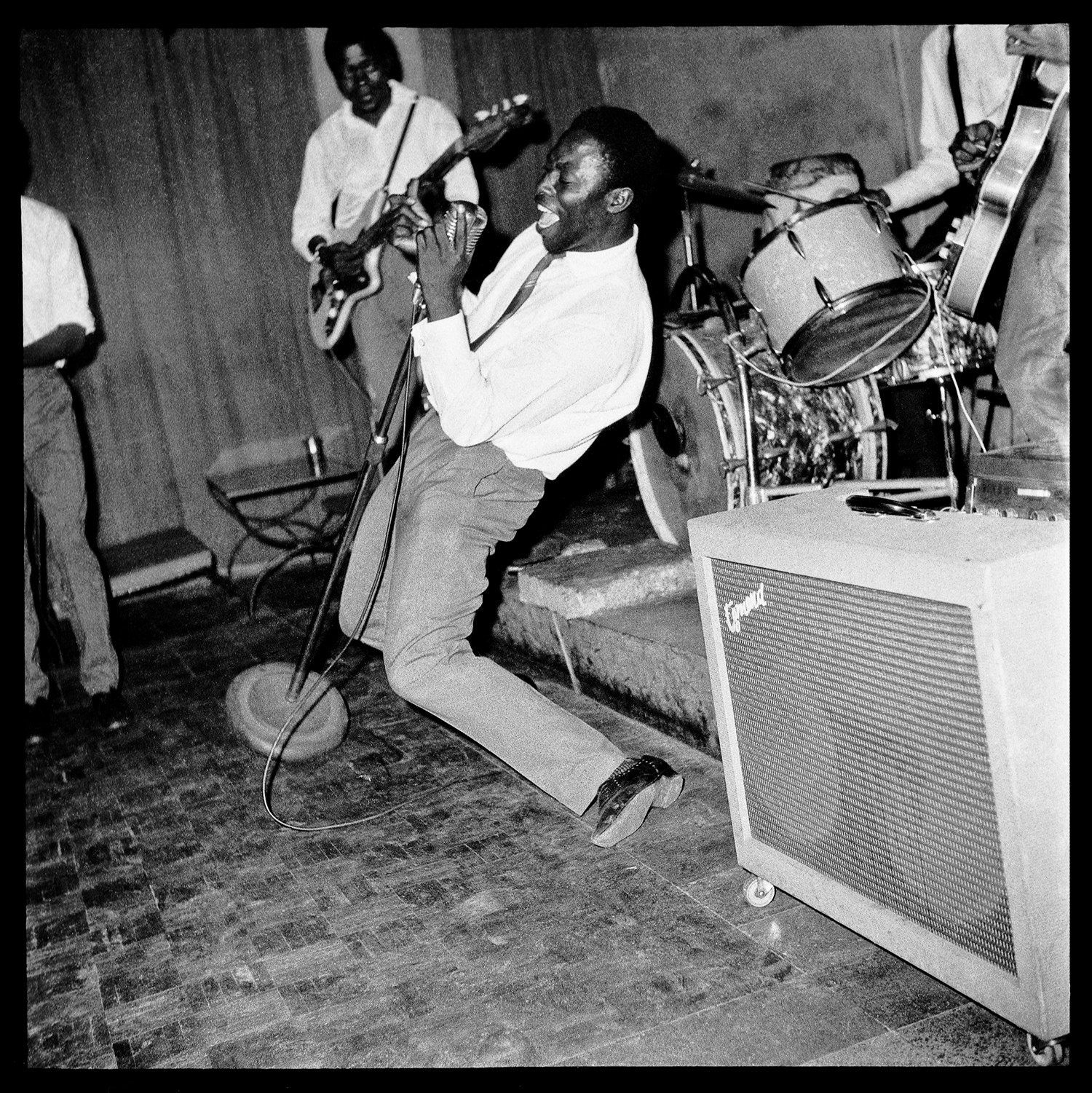
A Congolese rumba group performing in Léopoldville

According to Phyllis Martin's Leisure and Society in Colonial Brazzaville, the popular partnered dance music in the former French Congo and Belgian Congo, which now constitute the Republic of the Congo and the Democratic Republic of the Congo, respectively, was known as maringa. Maringa was a Bakongo dance similar to West African highlife and historically practiced within the former Kingdom of Loango, covering areas in the present-day Republic of the Congo, southern Gabon, and Cabinda Province of Angola. The dance involved a small skin-covered frame drum called patenge for counter-rhythms, a bottle functioning as a triangle, and an accordion known as likembe, which possessed seven to nine steel reeds. The distinctive movements of maringa dancers involved a rhythmic hip sway that shifted body weight alternately from one leg to the other, reminiscent of the Afro-Cuban rumba dance, which later eclipsed older dances and musical forms. The penchant for partnered dance traversed the Congo region by 1930. Ethnomusicology professor Kazadi wa Mukuna of Kent State University explains that many recording studio proprietors at the time began to market maringa as "rumba", while retaining its original name. Martin also observes that White society in Brazzaville, much like elsewhere, developed an interest in Latin American dance music, particularly the rumba, after it had been featured and made respectable at the 1932 Chicago World Fair. However, both the White elite and African aristocracy predominantly embraced the tango and the biguine, a dance reminiscent of the Brazilian samba but originating from Martinique, alongside other transatlantic dances.

In 1934, Jean Réal, a French entertainment director from Martinique, coined the term "Congo Rumba" when he founded an ensemble by that name in Brazzaville in 1938. Clément Ossinondé, a Congolese musicologist specializing in Congolese music, notes that among the Congolese musicians affiliated with Congo Rumba, Gabriel Kakou and Georges Mozebo were prominent figures instrumental in popularizing the genre and mentoring emerging local musicians.

=== Modern Congolese rumba evolution ===
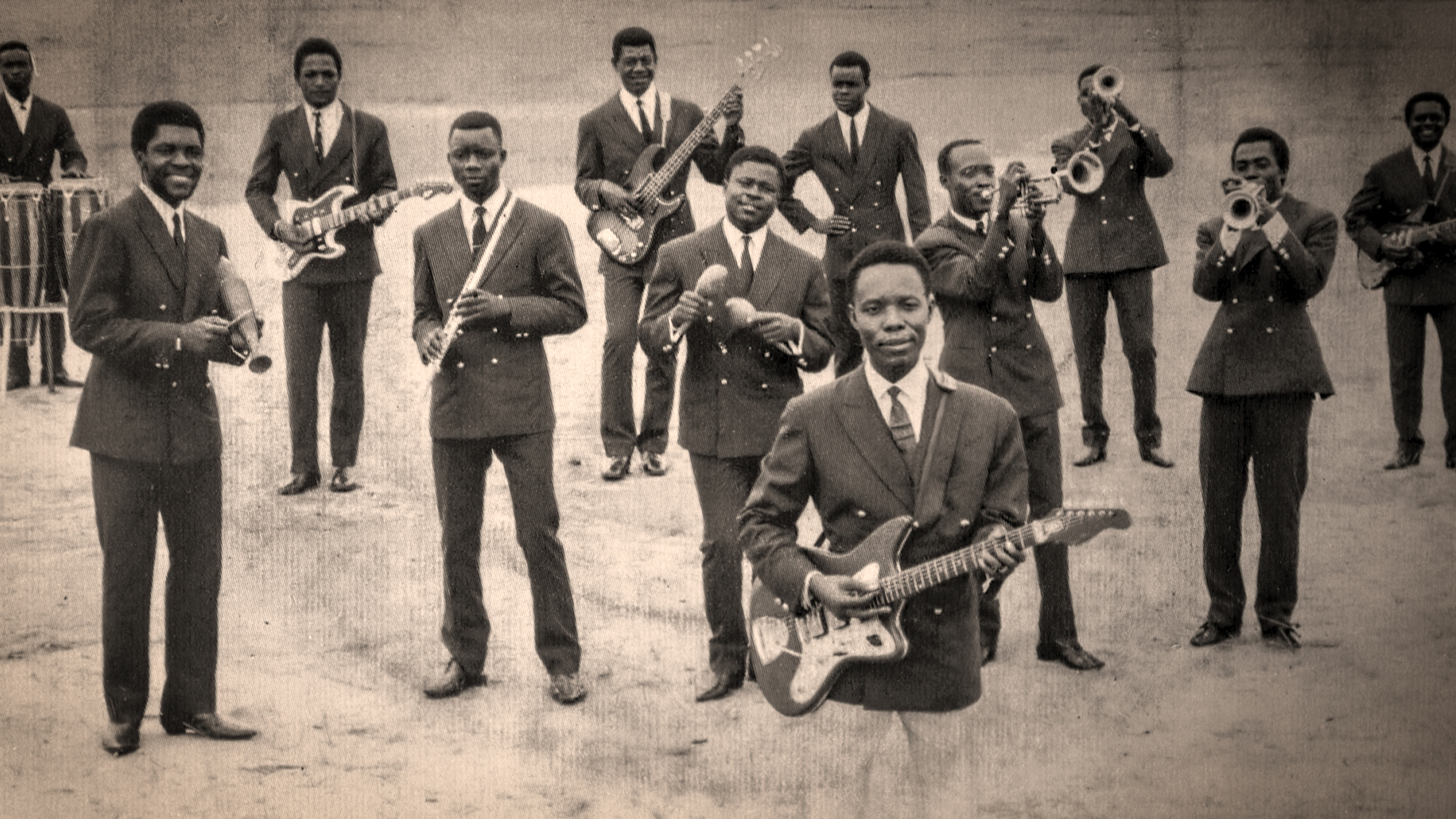
Nico Kasanda leading the African Fiesta Sukisa orchestra

==== West African influence on Congolese rumba ====
The substantial influx of students from Central Africa at the École des Cadres de Brazzaville, the forerunner of the University of Brazzaville, as well as the construction of the Congo–Ocean Railway, which enticed a significant migrant workforce from Central and West Africa between 1930 and 1934, catalyzed the evolution of Congolese rumba in Brazzaville.

Among these migrants were Central Africans known as Goué na Bangui as well as people from Dahomey (present-day Benin) and Togo, often referred to as Popo. These groups propped up the ranks of Congolese clerks in the colonial administration. Other sources use the term Coastmen to describe migrants from the western coast of Africa, who are today generally identified as West Africans or Ndingari, and those from countries including Nigeria, Ghana, Mali, Benin, Guinea, Senegal, and Togo. Many worked in public construction projects, education, commerce, and other skilled trades and professions. The Coastmen, most of whom were Muslims, also introduced cultural practices that influenced local society, such as the spread of polygamy and the use of wax-print fabrics. These Coastmen founded the Excelsior Orchestra to occupy their leisure time, which was the "very first organized urban dance music group", in contrast to traditional Congolese music. Founded in Boma, it was modeled after the Excelsior Orchestra of Accra, established in 1914 by Franck Torto. On weekends, the orchestra performed maringa music in bars, many of which were still simple structures made of reeds, as well as on street corners. Its repertoire consisted largely of highlife music played with European instruments, including the guitar, saxophone, double-bell trumpet, chromatic accordion, and piano. According to Henri Bowane, the Coastmen also established a second ensemble known as Jazz Popo. The musical influence of these Coastmen encouraged many Congolese musicians to follow similar styles. Emmanuel Okamba, a Congolese musicologist, explains that Zacharie Elenga (popularly known as Jhimmy Zakari), introduced a rhythm inspired by a Cuban sound, dominated by highlife and polka. Some musicologists assert that these immigrant laborers played a seminal role in pioneering the instrumental component of Congolese rumba known as sebene, though this is often debated, with other musicologists accrediting Antoine Kasongo Kitenge's orchestra, Antoine Wendo Kolosoy, Henri Bowane, and Félix Manuaku Waku instead.

==== Emergence of local musicians ====
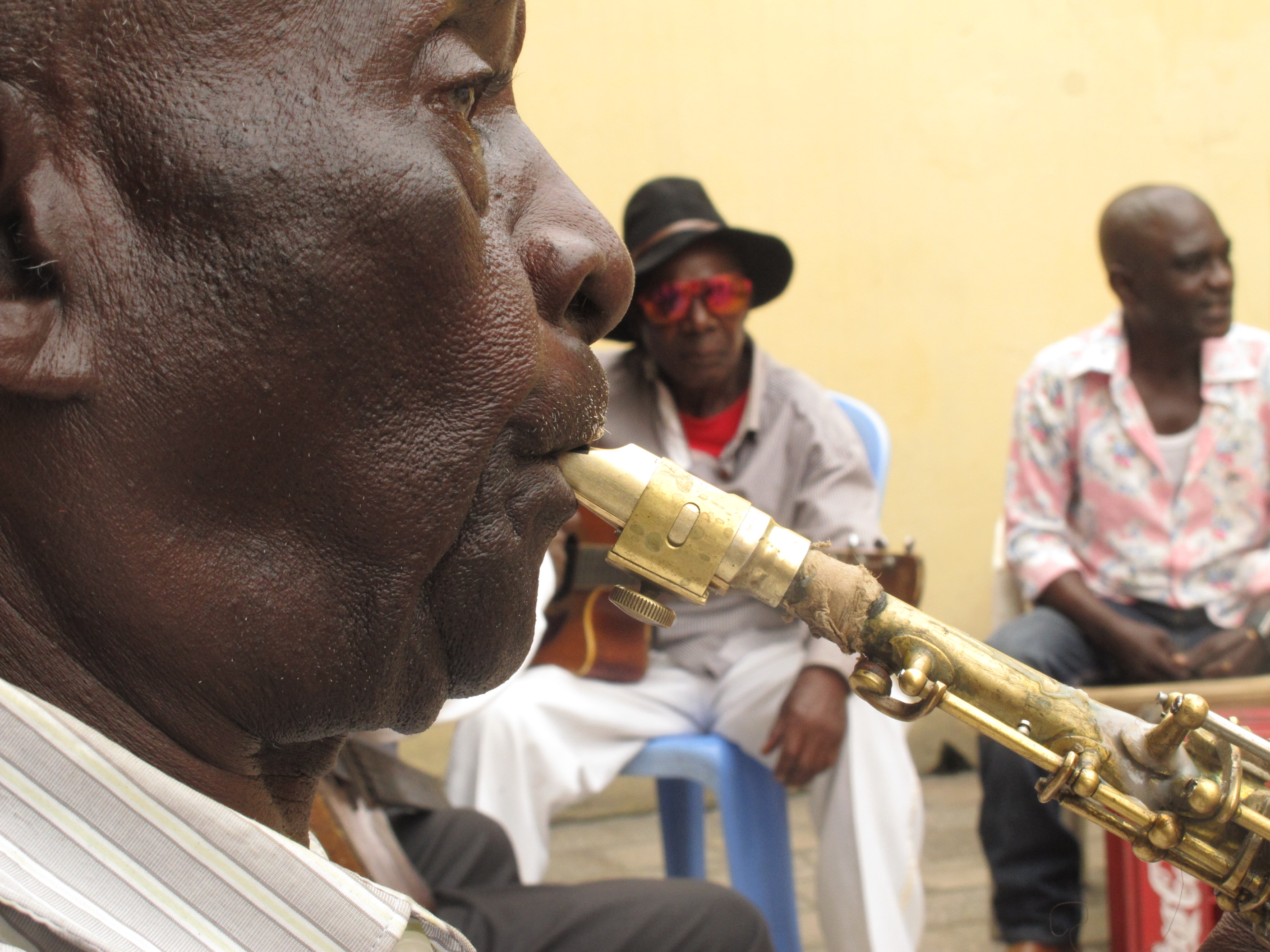
Saxophonist May Plau rehearsing in Kinshasa

The vocal ensemble Bonne Espérance emerged in 1935, conceived by the organist Albert Loboko, known as "Nyoka", a Congolese footballer born in Mossaka and a schoolmate of Paul Kamba. Accompanied by musicians Raymond Nguema, Joseph Botokoua, and Bernardin Yoka, Bonne Espérance performed their music at venues such as Chez Mamadou Moro and the Cercle Culturel Catholique de Poto-Poto in Brazzaville. After his return from Mindouli, where he served as an accountant at Congo–Ocean Railway, Kamba introduced a "new musical language" incorporating string and keyboard instruments. In early 1937, the musical ensemble Mannequin was established in Bacongo, under the leadership of François Bamanabio, who, alongside Massamba Lébel, later founded the Jazz Bohème orchestra. However, Réal's arrangements and inclusion of contemporary instruments to local musicians later that year conferred substantial advantages on Brazzaville's native artists, including Alphonse Samba, Michel Kouka, Georges Nganga, Côme Batoukama (guitar), Vital Kinzonzi (accordion), Emmanuel Dadet (saxophone, guitar, and more), and Albert Loboko (banjo, piano, guitar). Four brass bands subsequently emerged in Brazzaville, including the Fanfare Militaire, the Fanfare de la Milice, the Fanfare Catholique, and the Fanfare Municipale.

Dadet and Antoine Kasongo pioneered the contemporary rendition of Congolese folk music by incorporating new influences into their songs. Dadet, proficient on the saxophone, clarinet, and guitar, devised a musical style characterized by "free polyphony", inspired by jazz soloists. His ensemble, Melo-Congo, garnered acclaim among the White elite, performing a diverse repertoire ranging from classic waltzes and foxtrots to contemporary rumba, biguines, and tangos. The ensemble bolstered the prominence of local artists such as Pierre Mara, Georges Ondaye, Jean-Marie Okoko, Philippe Ngaba, Pierre Kanza, Casimir Bounda, Jean Dongou, Augustin Thony, André Tsimba, Pierre Loemba, Barète Mody, Pascal Kakou, Félix Maleka, and Botokoua. Melo-Congo enjoyed tremendous success, performing in Poto-Poto at the dance bar PICKUP, then at dance halls like Chez Faïgnond, Macumba, Beauté Brazza, Chez Ngambali, Mon Pays, and Léopoldville.

While Brazzaville became known for its vocal groups, Léopoldville developed a tradition of instrumental bands. Among the earliest was the ensemble led by the accordionist Camille Feruzi. Born in Stanleyville (now Kisangani), Feruzi learned to play maringas on the accordion from his father at a young age. In the late 1920s, he traveled by riverboat to Léopoldville. Around 1938 or 1939, he formed a quartet consisting of accordion, piano, guitar, and saxophone, which became one of the city's pioneering instrumental groups. Influenced in part by a saxophonist from Guadeloupe, the ensemble gradually moved away from traditional maringa melodies and began performing Latin American-inspired rhythms.

==== Impact of radio broadcasting and international recording companies ====
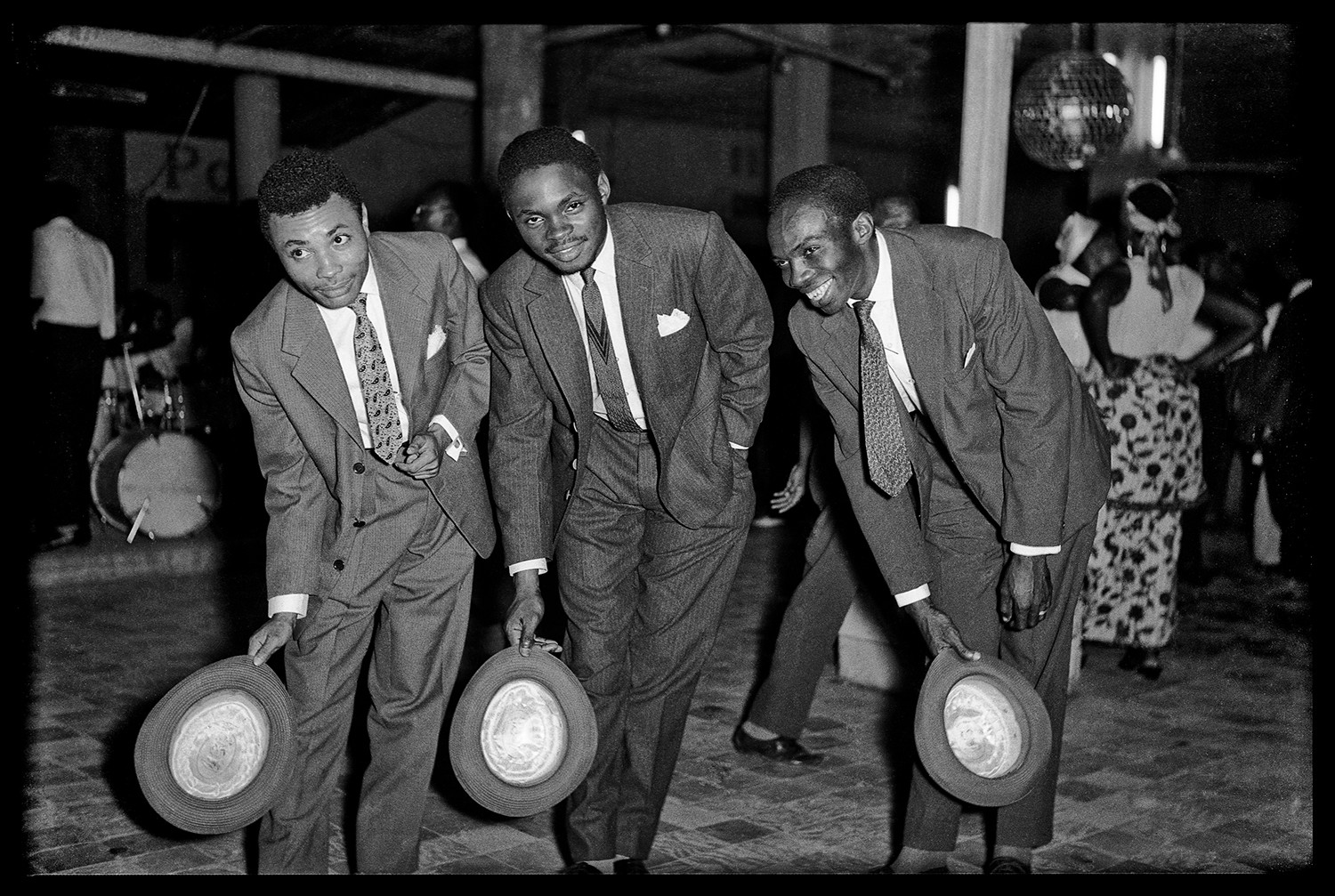
Congolese rumba bar in Léopoldville

The music of early son cubano bands enjoyed substantial popularity domestically and abroad, which boosted the initiation of the G.V. Series by EMI on the label His Master's Voice in 1933. The G.V. series, intended for export, particularly to Africa, presumably catered to diverse audiences over time as it evolved. The global recording industry reached sub-Saharan Africa relatively late, with a handful of novelty recordings (primarily African "spirituals") from the Gold Coast, Nigeria, and South Africa preceding the First World War. By the late 1920s, international labels such as Gramophone Company, Odeon Records, and Pathé Records began competing for markets across the continent. However, economic adversity, the limited size of local markets, and the war effort constrained the development of local commercial recording until the 1940s. Records from the G.V. series were thus instrumental in the budding African recording industry, becoming some of the most widely circulated records of the 1930s. Most records listened to in Léopoldville were manufactured in Europe and imported to the Belgian Congo via Matadi, the principal port of entry. During this period, it was customary for African sailors to procure records during their travels abroad, either as gifts or for sale to friends or acquaintances. Such transactions often occurred through itinerant vendors at or near the port upon the arrival of overseas vessels. Following the advent of radio technology in the region, demand for pre-recorded music surged, prompting local merchants to recognize records as a lucrative enterprise. A Belgian radio enthusiast and entrepreneur named Hourdebise, who inaugurated the first commercial radio station in the Belgian Congo in 1939, regularly broadcast records from the G.V. series. He also allocated air time to local artists and was credited with discovering the singer-songwriter Antoine Wendo Kolosoy. Hourdebise's Radio Congolia featured local and international news in four African languages—Tshiluba, Kikongo, Swahili, and Lingala—and was the first to install loudspeakers for direct broadcasting in the African quarters of the city. Radio Congolia's popularity spurred local merchants' interest in record sales, with major retailers in the capital, such as SEDEC Montre and Olivant, beginning to import records alongside more costly items like phonographs and radios.

In August 1941, Paul Kamba formed the Victoria Brazza ensemble in Poto-Poto, accompanied by Henri Pali Baudoin, Jacques Elenga Eboma, Jean Oddet Ekwaka, François Likundu, Moïse Dinga, Philippe Moukouami, Paul Monguele, François Lokwa, Paul Wonga, Joseph Bakalé, and Auguste Boukaka. The ensemble's rhythm section incorporated the maringa rhythm and traditional instruments, including a bass drum, a patengé, bells (reminiscent of maracas affixed to hunting dogs), double bells known as ekonga, a likembe, and modern instruments such as an accordion, a guitar, a mandolin, a banjo, and a rackett. This fusion of the programmable sounds of modern instruments with the intuitive, non-programmable sounds of traditional instruments reflected Kamba's "musical genius and permanently established the musical syncretism that became the foundation of modern Congolese rumba".

In the early 1940s, the music of Cuban son groups, such as Sexteto Habanero, Trio Matamoros, and Los Guaracheros de Oriente, was played on Radio Congo Belge in Léopoldville, quickly gaining nationwide popularity. Congolese musicians began to transpose aspects of Cuban son, including piano sounds, drum patterns, and trumpet phrasing, to electric guitars and saxophones. They occasionally performed in phonetic Spanish or French. Gradually, however, they infused the music with local rhythms and melodies, progressively bestowing it with local nuances. Although maringa dance music bore no significant relation to Cuban rumba, it became known as "Congolese rumba" due to the frequent mislabeling of imported records by Sexteto Habanero and Trio Matamoros as "rumba". The music historian Gary Stewart noted that the exact origin of this naming confusion remains unclear. The Mexican producer Eduardo Llerenas, who collected sones for his Corason label, believed it came from record companies incorrectly labeling the music. For example, Don Azpiazú's version of "El Manicero" ("the peanut vendor") was marketed as a "Rumba Fox-trot", even though it was actually a son composition. However, many other GV releases were identified correctly as son. Stewart also suggested that Congolese audiences may simply have preferred the word "rumba" because it sounded more dance-oriented and familiar. Among French-speaking Congolese as well as Spanish speakers, son was understood only as a general word meaning "sound". Whatever the reason, Congolese audiences gradually began grouping all Cuban music under the label of rumba, much in the same way that many styles of Congolese popular music later came to be grouped under the term "soukous". During this period, Congolese musicians "temporarily" experimented with other Caribbean and Latin American genres such as biguine and merengue. Musicologist Kazadi wa Mukuna emphasized that Congolese rumba remained fundamentally rooted in maringa, with Latin forms functioning chiefly as pedagogical models for mastering new instruments and arrangements. Once these skills were assimilated, the foreign idioms were largely abandoned due to their limited compatibility with Congolese musical aesthetics. Franco Luambo later articulated this distinction, remarking: "Many people think they hear a Latin sound in our music. Maybe they are thinking of the horns. Yet the horns are only playing vocal parts in our singing style. The melody follows the tonality of Lingala, the guitar parts are African and so is the rumba rhythm. Where is the Latin?" Among the pioneering figures of this formative period were Antoine Kasongo Kitenge, Paul Kamba, Zacharie Elenga, and Antoine Wendo Kolosoy. Elenga, in particular, transformed Congolese rumba by introducing the guitar solo and developing ensemble arrangements that included rhythm and lead guitars, double bass, saxophone, and percussion.

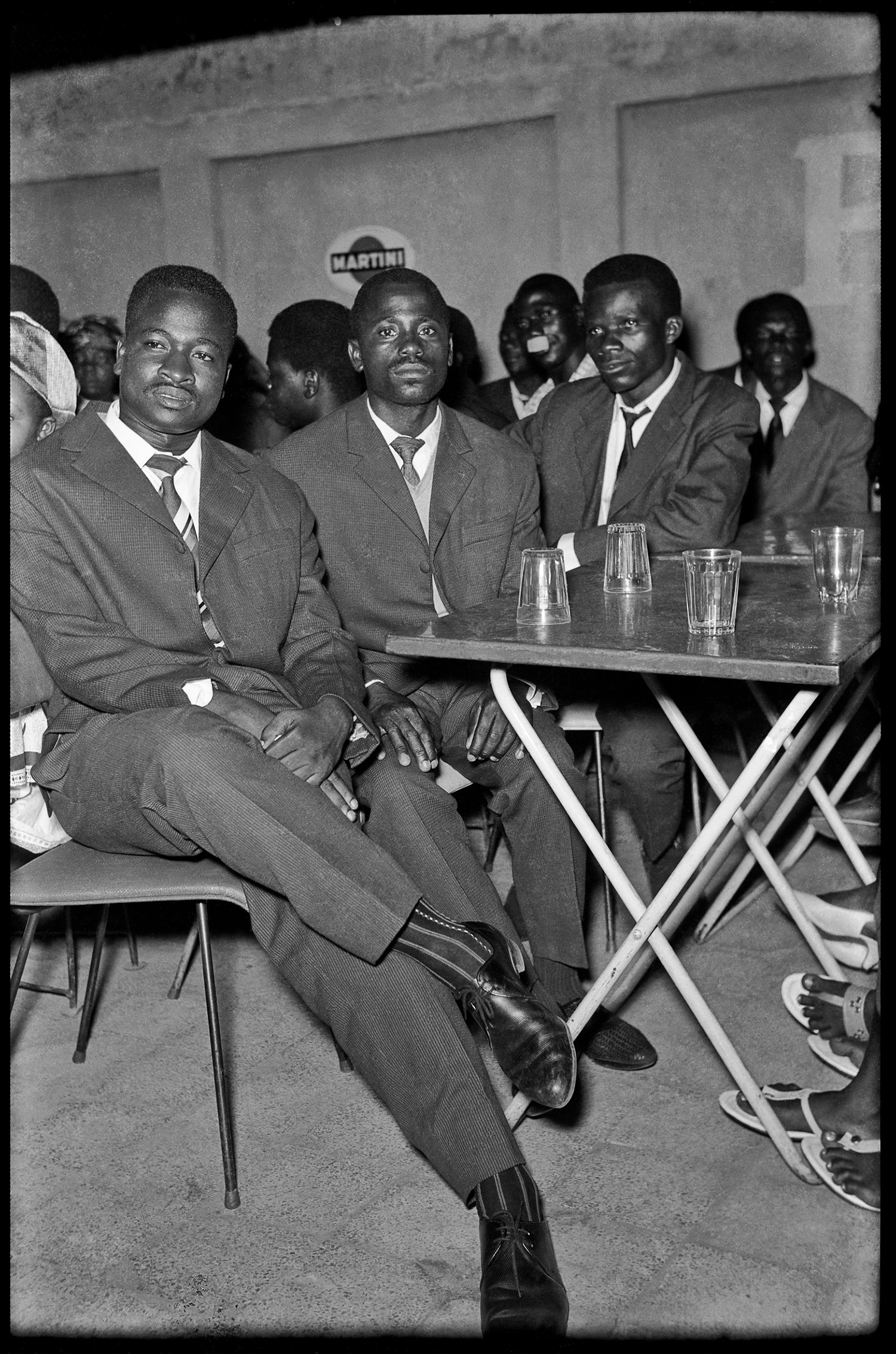
A gathering of évolués, a class of Western-educated Congolese, at a rumba dance bar in Léopoldville.

On 1 January 1949, the colonial authorities inaugurated Radio Congo Belge pour Africains (RCBA), positioning it as a substitute for traditional modes of communication, such as the tam-tam. Governor General Eugène Jungers symbolically likened the new medium to a modernized tribal drum, referring to it as the "tam-tam of the Bula matari", a Kikongo term meaning "breaker of rocks" that evoked colonial brutality and referred to any agent of the Belgian Congo. This rhetoric situated radio within the colonial narrative of conquest and transformation, as the medium was used to reinforce Belgian authority and reframe indigenous communication practices. To maximize its reach and create an impression of inclusivity, RCBA employed Congolese announcers to broadcast daily in four major local languages: Lingala, Kiswahili, Tshiluba, and Kikongo. Educational content was delivered in French and Lingala for members of the Force Publique, while a separate program in French targeted the évolués, a term referring to Western-educated Congolese. These linguistic choices supported the Belgian colonial vision of a multicultural but segmented national identity, often referred to as a "cultural mosaic". Broadcasts typically opened with a musical segment known as the uélé, a musical march adapted from indigenous rhythms and named after the Uele River region in the Oriental Province, performed by the Force Publique. This served to construct a supra-ethnic identity while reinforcing colonial ethnic categorizations through references to the "five great races"—Bangala, Bakongo, Baluba, Baswahili, and Banyarwanda—as designated by RCBA's director, Karel Theunissen. These classifications loosely aligned with major linguistic and regional divisions within the Congo and drew from earlier precolonial political geographies. Despite the colonial framework, Congolese announcers and musicians began to develop their own forms of expression within the medium. One prominent figure was Pauline Lisanga, who joined RCBA in 1949 as its first female presenter. A member of the Bapoto community, Lisanga gained fame for her work in broadcasting and became one of the earliest female performers of Congolese rumba.

By the 1950s, radio sets and communal listening stations had become widespread in the cité indigène (native quarters), which weaved RCBA into the cultural and musical daily life of urban residents. While initially introduced as a colonial instrument, radio broadcasting gradually became shaped by the preferences of its listeners. RCBA, later renamed Émissions Africaines, distinguished itself from other colonial radio services, such as the Union of South Africa's South African Broadcasting Corporation, which delayed broadcasting Black popular music until the early 1960s, by actively promoting local music from the outset. Rising audience interest sparked a transition from European content to locally produced music. As early as 1951, Congolese records began to surpass European ones in popularity. Their success propelled local musicians into a competitive arena dominated by foreign genres like cha-cha-chá, calypso, and Caribbean or Latin American mambos, causing significant disruption among Black artists in Léopoldville. Popularity polls and request logs from 1954 demonstrated the growing dominance of Congolese rumba music: 90% of the 30,000 music requests received were for Congolese rumba songs. Of the 5,000 most-requested titles, all were Congolese in origin, with six of the top selections performed by artists from Léopoldville. The most sought-after track was "Mabele ya Paul" by Antoine Mundanda, which received 863 requests. Mundanda's use of the traditional likembe distinguished his sound from the then-prevalent electric guitar-driven rumba. The influence of Congolese rumba quickly extended beyond the borders of the Belgian Congo. Artists were broadcast across the region, reaching audiences in Rwanda, Angola, and as far as West and East Africa. Cities like Lagos received these broadcasts via Radio Brazzaville, which aired four hours of programming daily in the late 1950s. Congolese rumba resonated widely due to its fusion of traditional Congolese rhythms and Cuban musical influences, positioning it as a "neo-African sound" with broad pan-African appeal. This stood in contrast to more localized West African styles such as highlife or jùjú, which remained regionally confined. The international popularity of Congolese rumba was further bolstered by bands such as African Jazz. The band's Cuban-inspired compositions facilitated a musical dialogue between Havana and Léopoldville, extending the genre's reach to audiences as far away as Puerto Rico.

=== Early Léopoldville-based orchestras and sebène ===
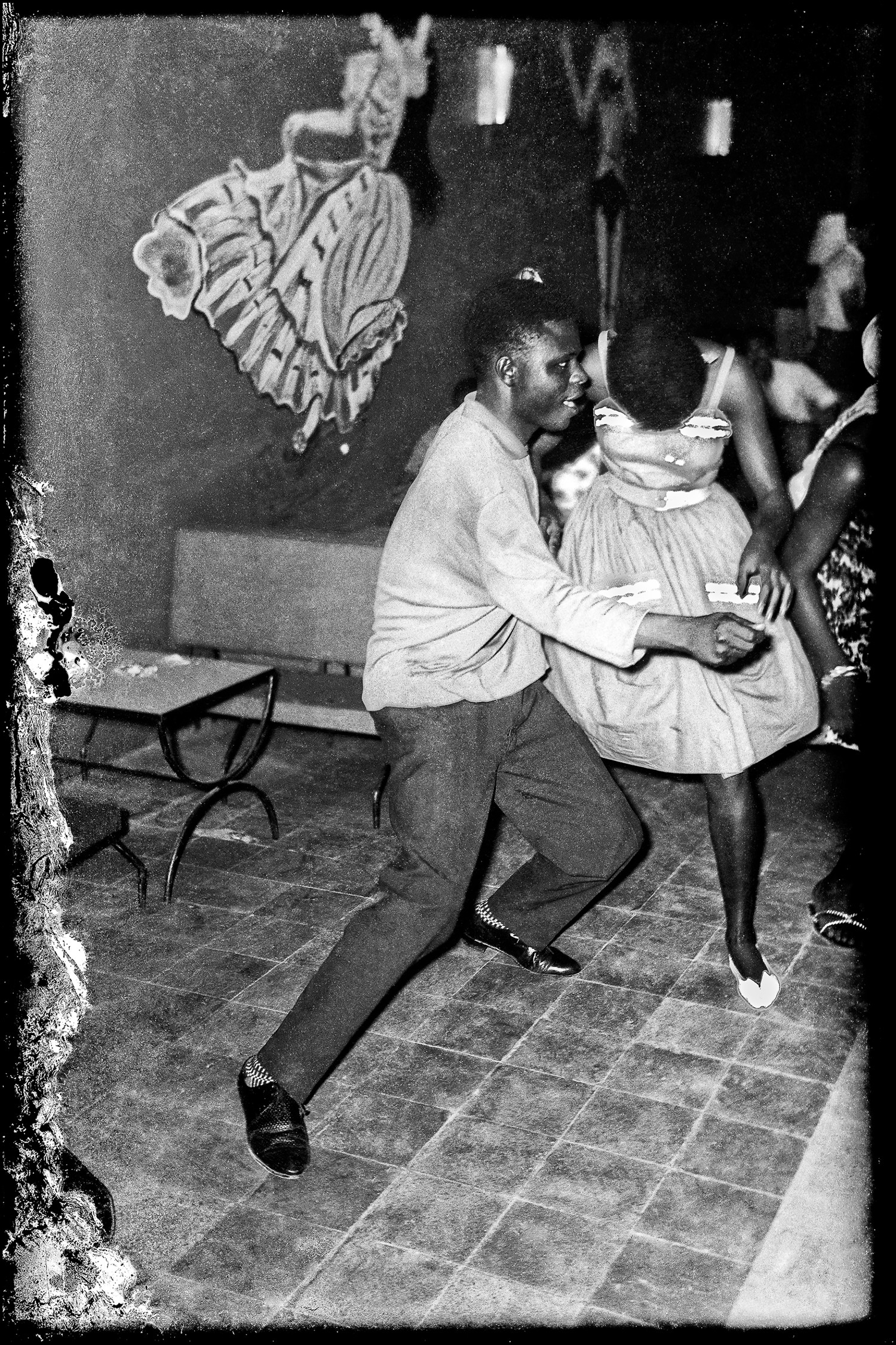
Young people grooving to Congolese rumba rhythms in Léopoldville, 1960s

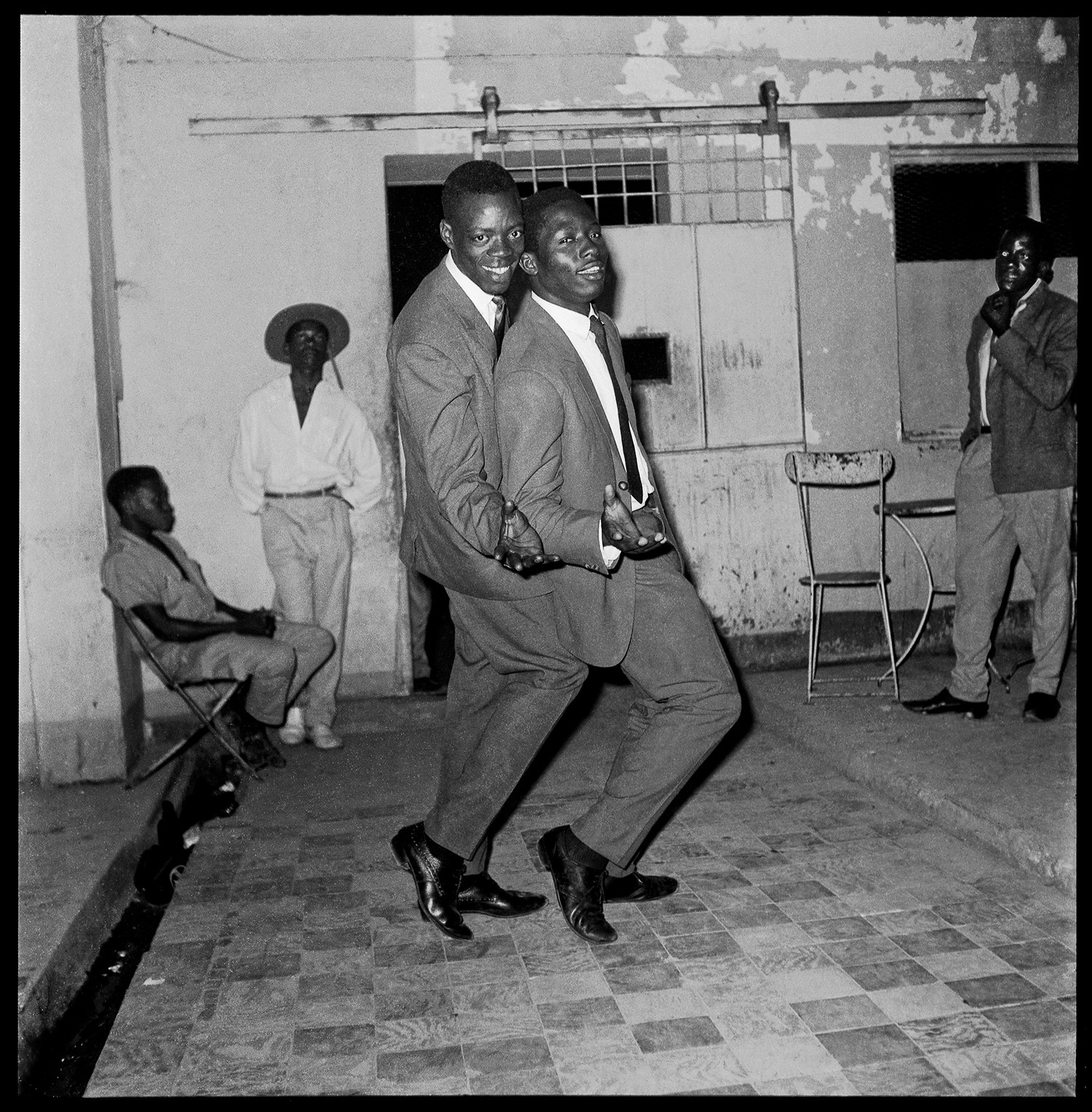
A duo performing at a Congolese rumba nightspot in Léopoldville, 1950s–60s

As early as 1942, three major brass-based orchestras had emerged in Léopoldville: Odéon de Kabamba et Booth; Orchestre Américain, directed by the Tshibangu brothers; and Orchestre Martinique of Kasongo, Fernandès, Booth, and Malonga. Among these, Odéon Kinois occupies a central position, with its foundation attributed to Eugène Kabamba, then president of the Association des anciens élèves des Frères des écoles chrétiennes (ASSANEF) and an official in the Ministry of Finance. With the backing of patrons such as Arthur Pinzi, Damien Kandolo, Joseph Tamba, and Alphonse Nguvulu, Kabamba assembled a group composed largely of alumni from the Boma Colonial School (Colonie Scolaire de Boma), a Jesuit-run institution favored by the colonial elite for their children's education. By the late 1940s, leadership had passed to dramatist Justin Disasi, later elected mayor of Kalamu commune. Disasi subsequently formed the ensemble Melo Kin, modeled after Melo Congo. Their composition "Se motema (Koyokana mpe kolingana)", released on the Loningisa label, became a national hit. In 1947, Disasi was succeeded at Odéon Kinois by trumpeter René Kisumuna, under whose direction the ensemble included André Dimbala (drums), Gabriel Lubaki (trumpet), Simon Mangbau (saxophone), Benoît Mokonzi (tuba), and Alexandre Habib (accordion). One of its hallmark compositions was Kisumuna's "Fatouma".

Orchestre Américain, established in 1945, arose in response to the departure of U.S. military bands that had performed New Orleans jazz for troops and civilians at Ndolo airfield during the Second World War. Initially directed by Pierre Disu, the orchestra featured Jean Lopongo (trumpet), Antoine Kasongo Kitenge (clarinet and saxophone), François Poto Galo (trumpet), Henri Mataso (trumpet), Alphonso Kasongo, and Camille Feruzi (accordion). Membership required formal training in music theory (solfège).

Orchestre Martinique derived its name from the presence of French Caribbean soldiers stationed in Brazzaville and from the popularity of the biguine rhythm, locally referred to as martiniquais. Under the leadership of Rufin Mutinga, the ensemble popularized this rhythm in Léopoldville's dancehalls. Many of its members, like their contemporaries, were products of the Colonie Scolaire de Boma, where music was taught primarily as part of a broad cultural education. While some pursued professional careers in other fields, others continued their involvement in music through teaching or performance.

A particularly influential figure was Antoine Kasongo Kitenge, a clarinetist and saxophonist educated at Sainte-Cécile school in Kintambo. Though sometimes confused with Odéon Kinois, Kasongo's own orchestra is widely credited with introducing the sebène, a repeated instrumental passage, often built around rhythmic guitar motifs, into Congolese dance music. While his ensemble relied heavily on brass instruments, the sebène marked a decisive break from European march-style arrangements, allowing greater improvisation and longer dance sequences, elements that would become hallmarks of Congolese rumba. Kasongo first recorded with Olympia in 1947, before joining the Ngoma label in 1949, where he collaborated with guitarist Zacharie Elenga, known as "Jhimmy à la Hawaïenne". His recordings included "Libala Liboso Se Sukali", "Baloba Balemba", "Naboyaki Kobina", "Se Na Mboka", "Sebene", and "Nzungu Ya Sika", often supported by singers Ninin Jeanne and Mpia Caroline.

Between 1940 and 1950, the rapid population growth of Kinshasa was accompanied by a flourishing social scene centered on bars, dancehalls, and cabarets. Establishments such as O.K. Bar, Kongo Bar, Siluvangi, Zeka Bar, and the Home des Mulâtres became cultural focal points where orchestras regularly performed. Bars were both leisure spaces and crucibles of urban identity, where music, fashion, and sociability intersected. Women played a central role as well, organizing social clubs and associations linked to orchestras and nightlife, including L'Harmonie kinoise (1940), Diamant (1943), and La Mode préférée (1951).

=== Emergence of homegrown recording labels and musicians ===
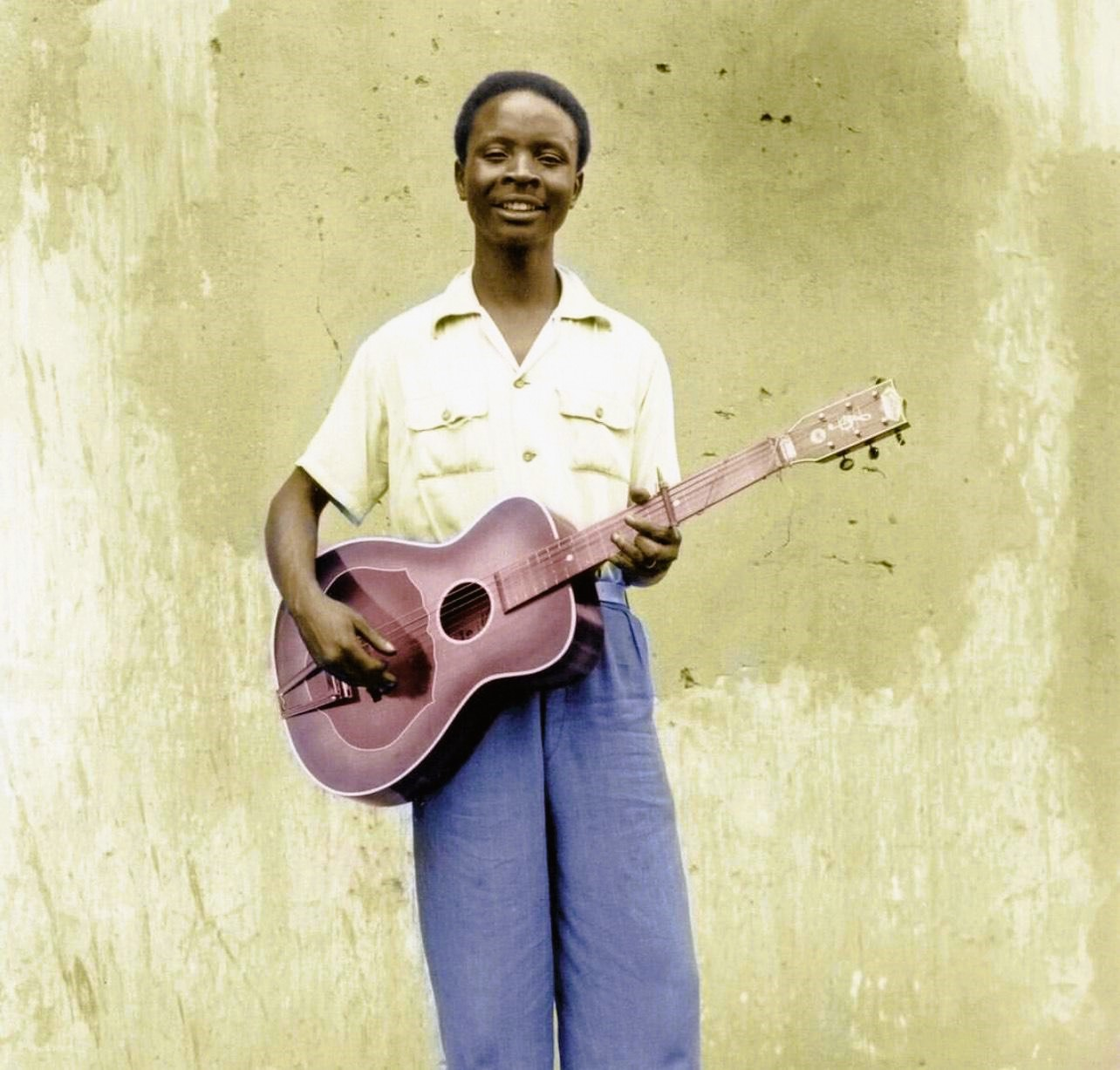
Jean-Bosco Mwenda in Katanga, Belgian Congo, in 1952

According to Gary Stewart, commercial recording of local artists in Léopoldville commenced with the Belgian entrepreneur Fernand Janssens, who arrived in the Belgian Congo post-World War II with recording equipment, intending to produce records to be mastered and pressed by his Belgium-based enterprise SOBEDI. A considerable number of recordings was issued under Janssens' Olympia label (and its local Congolese subsidiaries Kongo Bina and Lomeka), and by 1948, the Olympia African catalog encompassed over 200 titles, featuring military bands, missionary choirs, and an array of records for learning Lingala. Janssens also recorded some of the most influential first-generation musicians in Léopoldville, including Wendo's Victoria Kin, Orchestre Odéon Kinois, and Camille Feruzi, which facilitated the emergence of local and foreign-owned record companies pivotal to the genre's development. The Greek entrepreneur Nico Jeronimidis converted a small storage structure behind his shop into a studio, soundproofing its interior. He procured a professional direct-to-disc recording machine and microphones from the United States. Jeronimidis named his studio Ngoma, the Kikongo term for "drum". Initially, the studio endeavored to record traditional music, but the logistical and financial burdens of transporting and compensating large troupes proved prohibitive, and the new recording technology was ill-suited to traditional music's extensive performances. Traditional bands, accustomed to prolonged play without interruption, faced constraints as the recorder's cutter head reached the disc's center within three minutes. Smaller, contemporary groups, whose compositions were more adaptable to the medium's limitations, proved more suitable. The three-minute format necessitated tighter structural discipline, aligning with the "European-style, workaday world of the city".

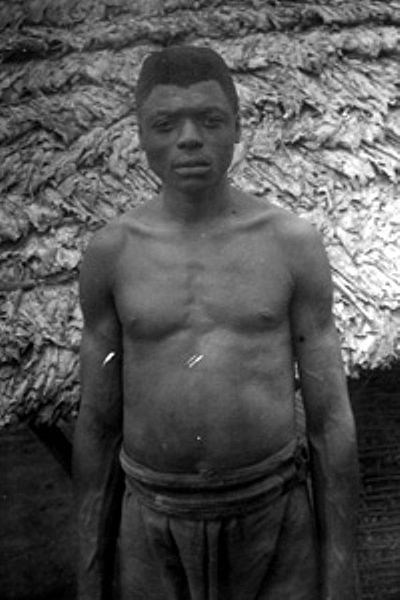
Simon Kimbangu was a Congolese religious leader and prophet who founded the Kimbanguist Church, one of the most influential African-initiated churches.

Shortly after Ngoma's inauguration in 1948, Jeronimidis encountered Henri Bowane, who introduced Wendo to the studio and recorded several songs. Musicians under contract reportedly received a monthly stipend for exclusive services, plus three to four hundred Belgian francs per recorded composition. Wendo's hit "Marie-Louise", co-written with guitarist Henri Bowane and produced by Ngoma, achieved significant success, selling over two million copies. A few months after its debut, a pervasive rumor circulated across the Belgian Congo, positing that Wendo's "angel voice" possessed the mystical ability to summon the apparition of a "missing beauty". This sudden surge of fame sparked concern among colonial authorities, who were grappling with the resurgence of Kimbanguism, a mystical independence movement spearheaded by Simon Kimbangu. The latter, of the Bakongo ethnic group, had proclaimed the "négritude of God", which earned him imprisonment but also garnered immense national recognition. Jeronimidis and Wendo embarked on an extensive tour across the country, traveling in a blue Ngoma van, fitted with roof-mounted speakers, a sight immortalized on the cover of the compact disc Ngoma: The Early Years, 1948–1960 (Popular African Music). This established Léopoldville as a hub of Congolese rumba "musical leadership", buoyed by the advent of the recording industry and studios operated by priests and production units affiliated with Greek traders, alongside new 45rpm pressing technology, which allowed musicians to extend recordings. Paul Kamba and his Victoria Brazza traversed the Congo River to make their debut record at Ngoma. Jeronimidis also signed Camille Feruzi and several singer-guitarists, including Manoka De Saio, Adou Elenga, Léon Bukasa, Manuel d'Oliveira, and Georges Edouard, who formed the ensemble San Salvador. The Ngoma studio thrived as wartime memories receded and the late 1940s heralded a promising new decade. Brazzaville's populace nearly doubled from approximately 45,000 in 1940 to around 84,000 by 1950, while Léopoldville's population surged from 50,000 to over 200,000 in the same period. The twin capitals, invigorated by new immigrants with employment and disposable income, bristled with opportunities for the entertainment industry.

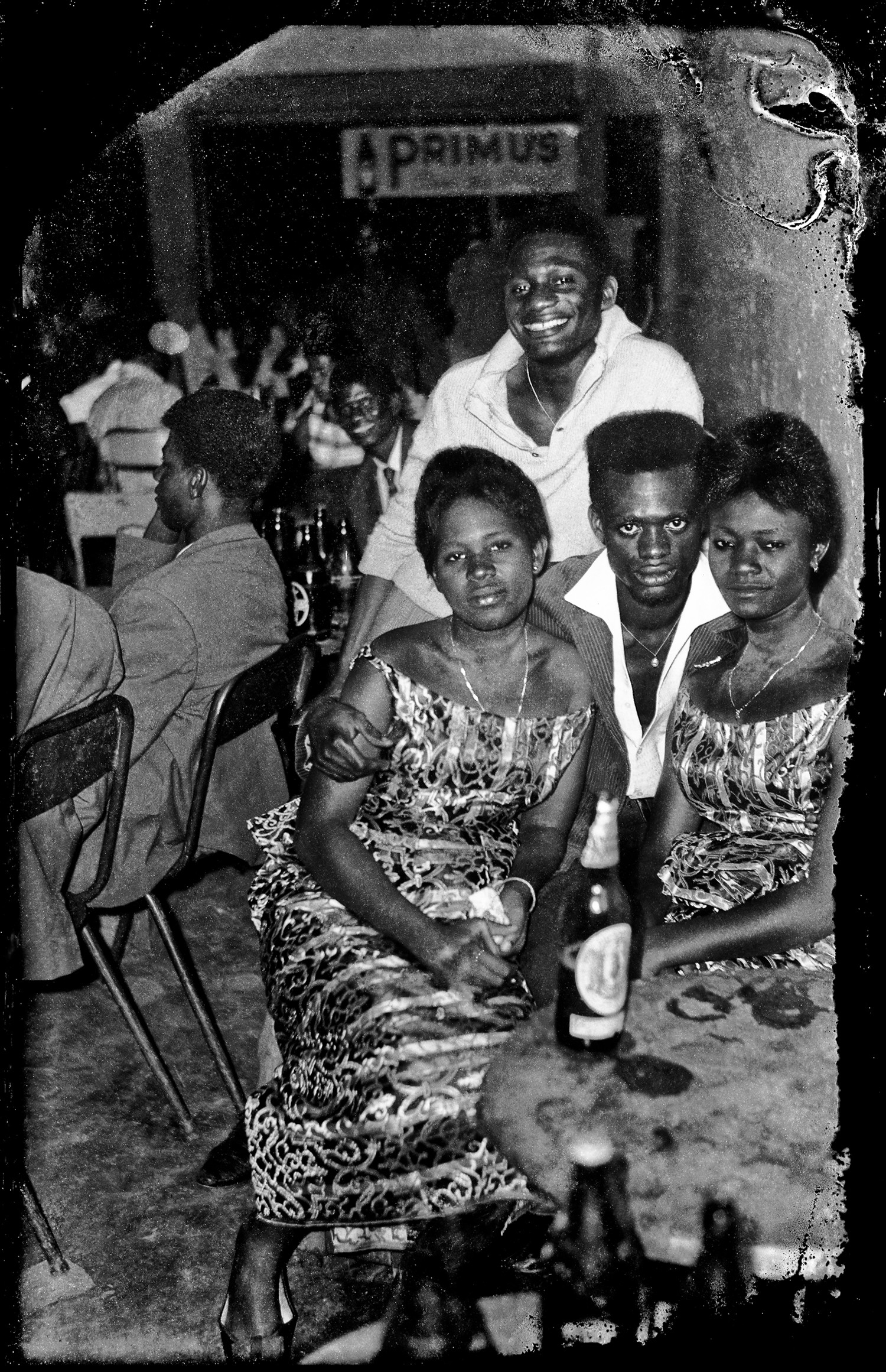
Kwamy Munsi (standing) and Simaro Lutumba (sitting, center) at a Congolese rumba club in Léopoldville

A Belgian guitarist named Bill Alexandre, who had honed his craft in the jazz clubs of Brussels during the Nazi occupation and performed alongside luminaries such as Django Reinhardt, eventually settled in Léopoldville and established CEFA (Compagnie d'Énregistrements Folkloriques Africains). Alexandre is credited with introducing the electric guitar to the Belgian Congo. Local musicians were enthralled by his gleaming Gibson guitar and his use of a plectrum. Alexandre would tour Léopoldville with his musicians in a van equipped with loudspeakers broadcasting CEFA releases.

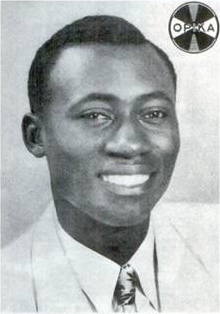
Promotional photo of Le Grand Kallé for Opika in the early 1950s

Opika, which means "hold steady", or "stand firm" in Lingala, was another pioneering record label in the Belgian Congo. It played a critical role in recording and promoting Congolese rumba as well as music from other countries such as Cameroon and Ghana. The label was founded in 1949 by two Jewish entrepreneurs, Gabriel Moussa Benatar and Joseph Benatar, originally from the island of Rhodes in Greece. Initially established under the name Éditions Musicales, the label was first called Kina, a term meaning "dancing" in Kikongo. This early name, however, became the subject of a legal dispute. Ngoma claimed prior ownership of the term "Kina" (as in "Kina Ngoma", meaning "playing the tam-tam" in Kikongo) dating back to its founding in 1948. Following a court ruling in favor of Ngoma, the Benatar brothers rebranded their label as Opika in 1950. The new name was suggested by Camille Yambi, a close associate of the founders. The label assembled a roster of musicians under the collective name Bana Opika, who collaborated across group lines to produce recordings. Its first major recording featured singer Paul Mwanga, accordionist Crispin Loleka, and guitarist Michel Buta. One of Opika's early successes was Mwanga's "I Yaya Naboyi Monoko Ya Mobka", a song that would later be recognized as a Congolese music classic. Among Opika's most prominent artists was guitarist Zacharie Elenga, who formed a duo with singer Mwanga. Together, they recorded hit songs like "Henriette" and "Ondruwe", which had widespread commercial success in the Congo and across the broader region. British journalist and researcher Andy Morgan described Elenga's music as "wild and combustible", noting that he "became a youth hero, a musical revolutionary who helped to define a blueprint for Congolese rumba that still applies". Opika was also the first label to sign Joseph Athanase Tshamala Kabasele, popularly known as Le Grand Kallé, who would go on to form the band African Jazz. In 1955, Opika ceased operations. Its studio equipment was acquired by Greek publisher Dino Antonopoulos, who founded Éditions Esengo. Between 1957 and 1960, Esengo became the new hub for Congolese popular music, producing major orchestras such as Rock-a-Mambo, African Jazz, and Conga Jazz, which carried forward the momentum initiated by Opika.

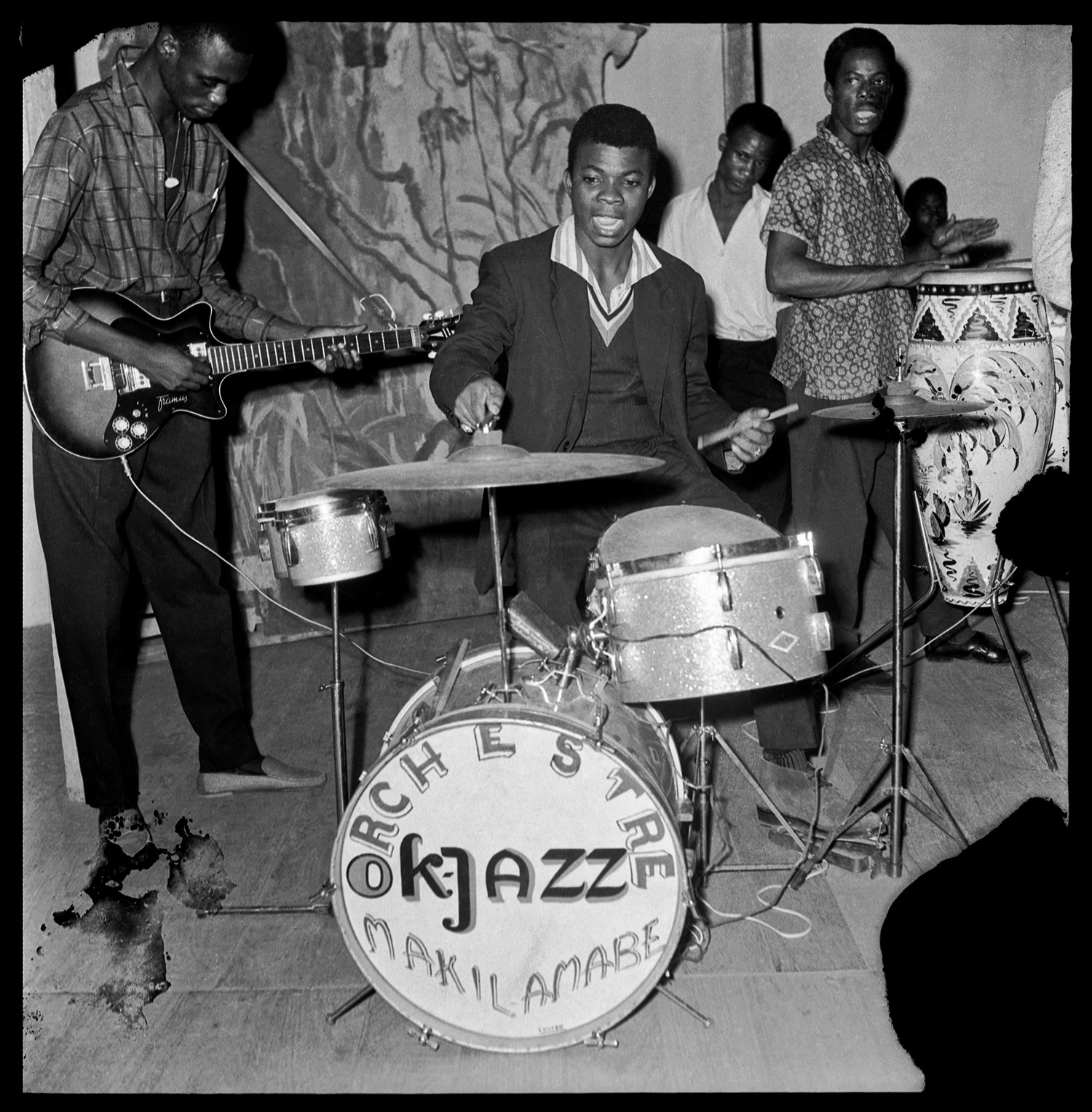
The drummer of OK Jazz in Léopoldville

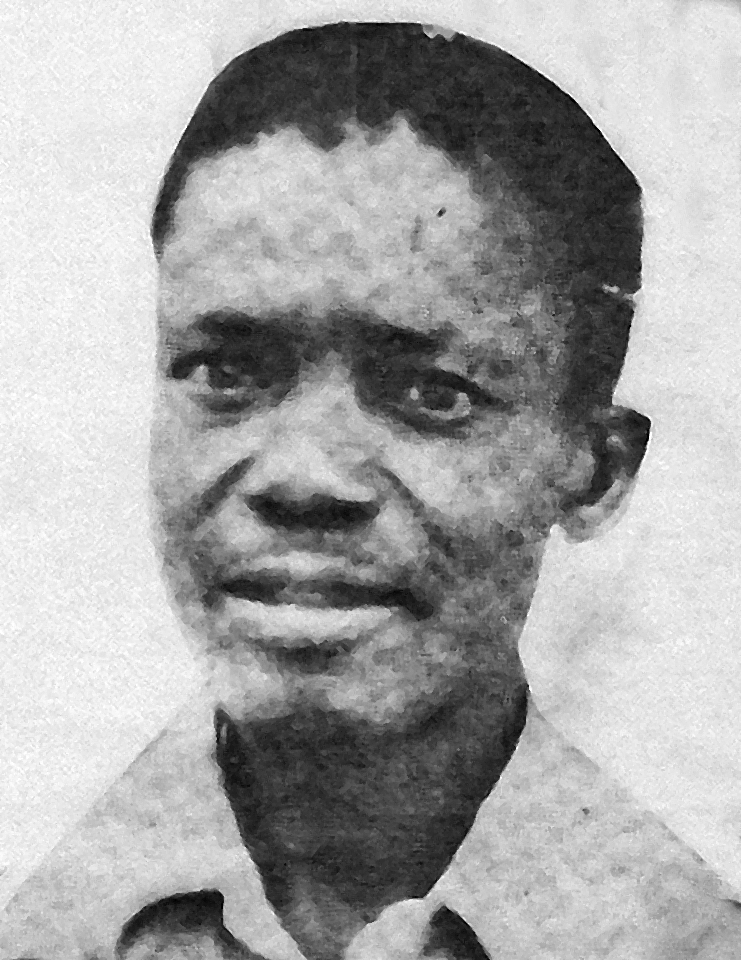
Adou Elenga in August 1981

By the early 1950s, local artists associated with eclectic Congolese labels owned by White settlers, such as Ngoma, Opika, and CEFA, began producing a similar style of Congolese rumba reminiscent of the hit "Marie-Louise". This style, often characterized by a slower tempo and minimal distinctions between orchestras, included works like Antoine Moundanda's "Paul Kamba Atiki Biso" (1950) and "Mabele Ya Paulo" (1953), released under Ngoma. Meanwhile, Ngoma-produced Adou Elenga's "Tout Le Monde Samedi Soir", an adaptation of a West African coastal hit, showcased a fusion of palm-wine guitar techniques from Liberia and Sierra Leone, with the two-finger guitar style prevalent in Shaba (now Katanga) and Northern Rhodesia (now Zambia). Ngoma also released Moundanda's 1953 smash hit "Mwana Aboyi Mama", a lament infused with likembe, guitar, flute, clarinet, and bass, which achieved unprecedented success, becoming the first Congolese rumba song to be awarded the Osborn Award by the Journal of the African Music Society in Union of South Africa for Best Recording of African Music. During the 1950s, amid rising anti-colonial sentiment in the Belgian Congo, Congolese rumba began to intersect with political activism. The cité indigène referred to the racially segregated districts of Léopoldville, designated for the Congolese population. Situated to the south of the European residential, industrial, and commercial quarters, these districts fell under the authority of the Ville de Léopoldville, formerly known as the Urban District. Unlike the centres extra-coutumiers, which had autonomous budgets, the cités were administratively limited. The city's population underwent significant growth during this period, expanding from approximately 31,380 in 1930 to 110,280 in 1946 and reaching an estimated 300,000 by the late 1950s. Adou Elenga's 1954 "Mokili Ekobaluka", colloquially recognized as "Ata Ndele" and produced by Ngoma, emerged as a revolutionary anthem. The song's lyrics, particularly the refrain "Ata ndele mokili ekobaluka, ata ndele mondele akosukwama" (Lingala for "sooner or later the world will change, sooner or later the whites will be kicked out"), were perceived as a direct challenge to colonial rule. As a result, Elenga faced imprisonment, but his song contributed to the growing discourse on independence and the genre's role in shaping public sentiment.

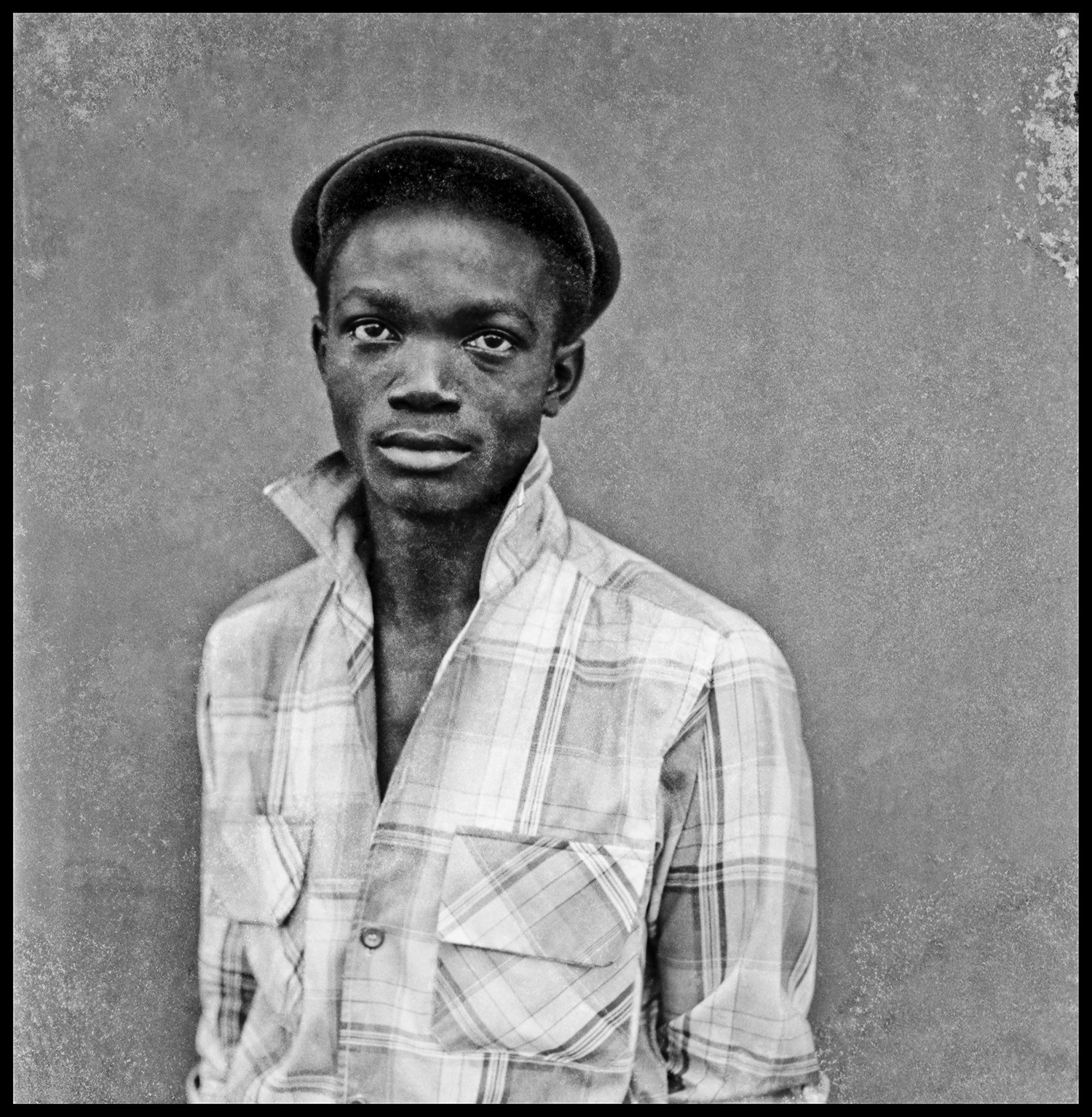
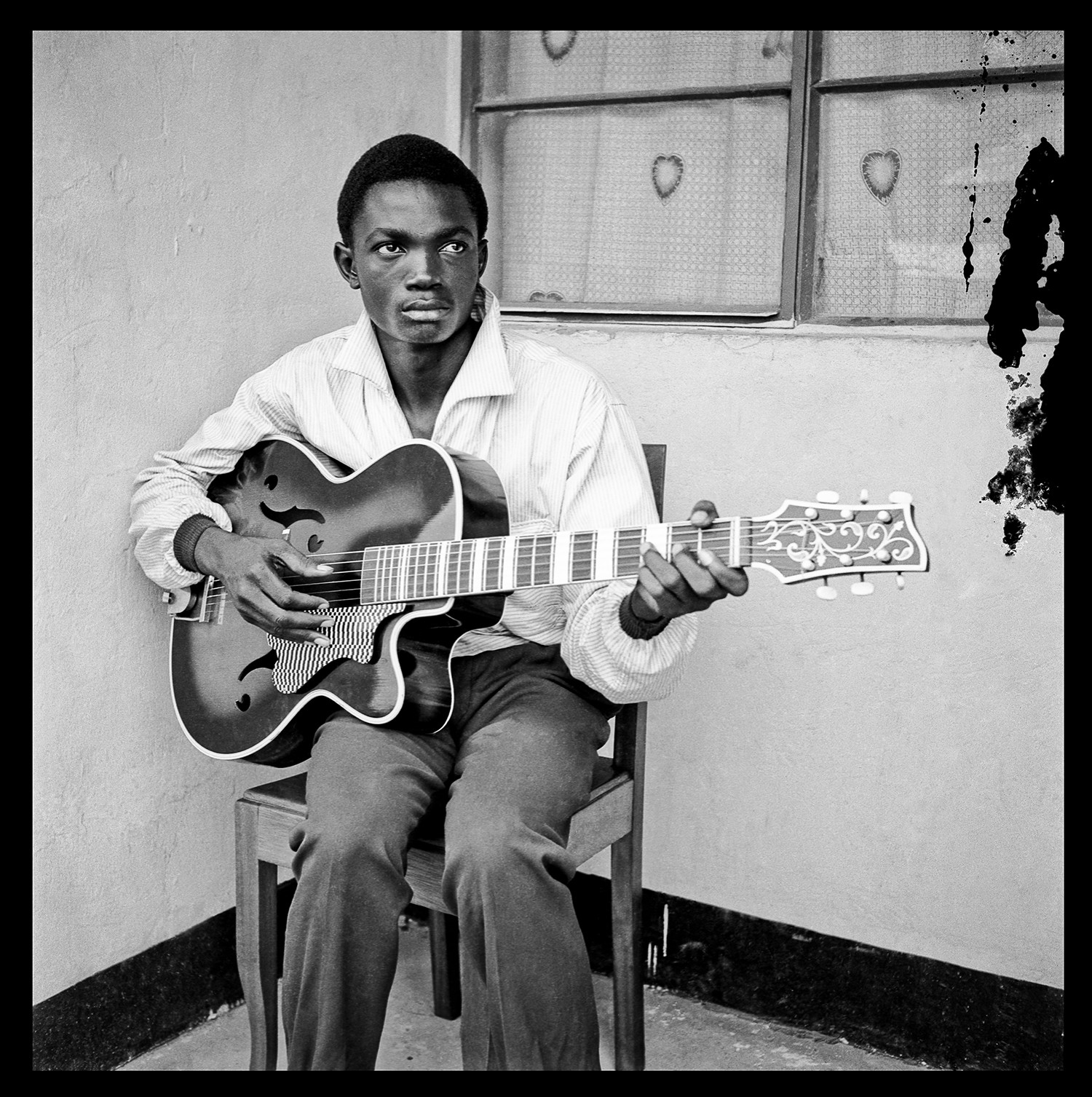
Franco Luambo was widely referred to as the "rumba king" for redefining and popularizing the genre.

That same year, the Papadimitriou brothers from Macedonia, Basile and Athanase, founded the Loningisa label and studio. Both brothers were fluent in Lingala and enjoyed widespread popularity among the Congolese populace. Basile, known for singing in the shop where he sold pagnes, was married to Marie Kitoko, a Congolese singer. One of Loningisa's early protégés was a "young, handsome, sharply dressed street kid" named François Luambo Luanzo Makiadi, better known as Franco Luambo. During the mid-1950s, Kinshasa's nightlife began to flourish, with numerous bars and performance venues providing platforms for musical experimentation. Loningisa's session musicians, collectively referred to as Bana Loningisa ("children of Loningisa"), performed regularly at the OK Bar, a venue named after its proprietor, Oscar Kashama. In early 1956, the Bana Loningisa rebranded themselves as OK Jazz in homage to their new employer and in recognition of their affinity for Americana, particularly Western music. Under Luambo's leadership, OK Jazz evolved into a musical academy of sorts, a finishing school for talent that counted among its alumni many of the great names in Congolese music: Verckys Kiamuangana Mateta, Youlou Mabiala, Sam Mangwana, Dizzy Mandjeku, Josky Kiambukuta, Ntesa Dalienst, Djo Mpoyi, and many others.

These record labels also provided the Belgian Congo a substantial platform for the proliferation and cultivation of homegrown bands, such as African Jazz, OK Jazz, Conga Jazz, Beguen Band, Jazz Mango, Jazz Venus, Dynamic Jazz, Affeinta Jazz, Mysterieux Jazz, Orchestre Novelty, Rumbanella Bande, Vedette Jazz, La Palma, Negrita Jazz, and Negro Band. Although the band names frequently included the word "jazz", Martin notes that "the essential musical inspiration came from African and Latin American roots". The name was used because young men were bedazzled by the American soldiers, especially African Americans, who were based at a military camp in Léopoldville during the Second World War. Scholars such as Isaac A. Kamola of Trinity College and Shiera S. el-Malik of DePaul University suggest that these Congolese "jazz" ensembles exhibited minimal musical affinity with American jazz, interpreting the appropriation as "identification with another culturally vibrant yet politically under-represented population" and that it symbolized a form of modernity that deviated from Eurocentric norms. This hybridity and foreign essence ensured that Congolese rumba did not align exclusively with "any particular tradition, region, or grouping" and allowed "Congolese rumba a broad and shared appeal".

The abrogation of all exclusivity contracts, a significant triumph, paved the way for Congolese entrepreneurs to establish their own record companies. Le Grand Kallé became the first Congolese musician to establish his own music label, under the name Surboum African Jazz, with financial backing from Léopoldville-based Congolese distribution and publishing company ECODIS (Edition Congolaise du Disque), the Congo-Decca group (a subsidiary of Decca West Africa Limited, owned by Decca Records), and the Belgian record company FONIOR, based in Brussels. The label's inauguration took place in Brussels during Le Grand Kallé's participation in the Belgo-Congolese Round Table Conference on Congolese independence. Le Grand Kallé capitalized on his stay in Brussels to record several pieces with the accompaniment of Cameroonian musician Manu Dibango. The advent of Surboum African Jazz enabled Le Grand Kallé to produce several other orchestras, including OK Jazz in 1961. During his trip to Brussels on behalf of Surboum African Jazz, OK Jazz recorded a series of hits for Le Grand Kallé: "Amida Muziki Ya OK", "Nabanzi Zozo", "Maria De Mi Vida", "Motema Ya Fafa", and others. The revenue generated from the sale of these records allowed OK Jazz to acquire brand-new musical equipment. Consequently, numerous music publishing houses, managed either by musicians or private individuals, proliferated in the early 1960s, including Epanza Makita, Editions Populaires, Eve, La Musette, ISA, Vita, Londende, Macquis, Parions, Mamaky, Boboto, Super Contact, and many more.

=== Schools of Congolese rumba ===
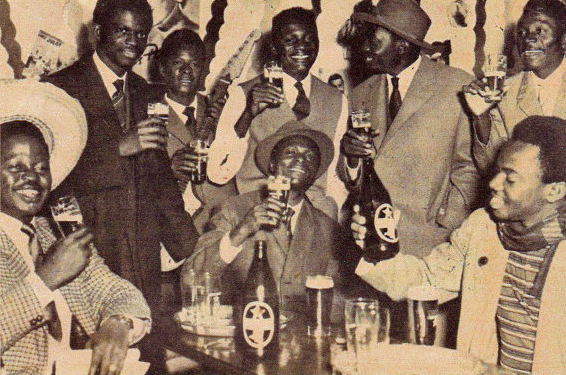
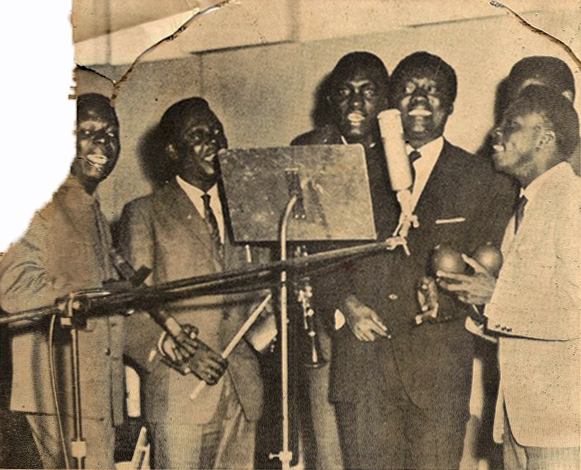
OK Jazz (left) and African Jazz (right) were two major schools of Congolese rumba during the 1950s and 1960s.

By the mid-1950s, a schism emerged between musicians receptive to foreign influences and those rooted in traditional Congolese rumba. This divergence led to the formation of two schools of modern Congolese rumba: the African Jazz School and the OK Jazz School. In 1957, these schools made significant advancements to the genre, with OK Jazz embracing a style known as odemba, characterized by a fast tempo and influenced by the rhythm from the Mongo folklore of Mbandaka, along the Congo River. Meanwhile, the African Jazz School introduced "rumba-rock", which had a faster tempo, with jazz and Afro-Cuban "accents in the arrangements". African Jazz also introduced tumba drums and electronic instruments. Classics like "Afrika Mokili Mobimba" made them one of Africa's most prominent bands, with its "loopy-riffing guitars, peculiar drum and bass grooves that lock in while twisting the beat, and horn parts that tell little melodic stories of their own".

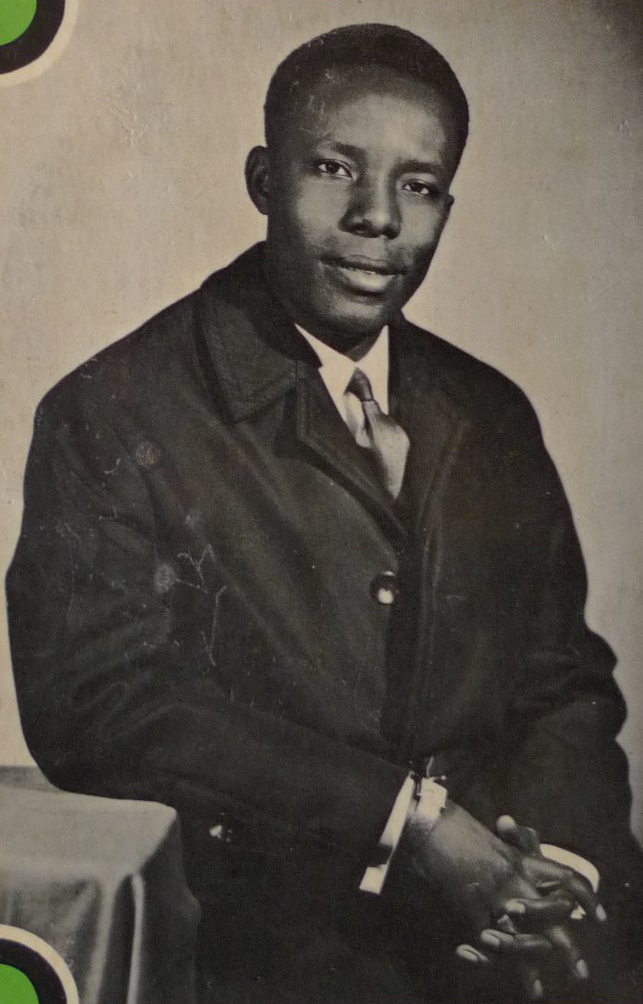
Docteur Nico in the 1960s

During this period, guitarist Faugus Izeidi of African Fiesta Le Peuple, formerly of the African Jazz School, pioneered the mi-solo guitar, filling a role between the lead and rhythm guitars. Franco Luambo characterized his mi-solo style with arpeggio patterns and fingerpicking techniques. American music journalist Morgan Greenstreet noted that former African Jazz School member Docteur Nico became a groundbreaking guitarist in Congolese music history with his fiesta style, drawing on traditional Baluba melodies and rhythms from his home village of Mikalayi. Meanwhile, Franco Luambo and the OK Jazz School transformed the sebene into the central element of Congolese music, as opposed to merely a departure between choruses, with Franco's odemba style being "rougher, more repetitive and rooted in rhythms that moved the hips of dancers at Kinshasa's hottest clubs".

Numerous groups reflected this division by aligning themselves with one or the other movement. Among them were Rock-a-Mambo, Beguen Band, Vedette Jazz, Dynamic Jazz, Congo et Conga Jazz, La Rumbanela Band, Makina Loka, Micra Jazz, Crishna Jazz with Bebi, Jazz Capable, Affeinta Jazz, Jazz Loningisa, Calypso Jazz, Viviane Mambo, Jazz Mango, Negro Succès (first and second formations), Cobantou, Los Angel, Kin Bantou, Super Baka, Comet Mambo (Matadi), Grand Micky de Matadi, Super Fiesta (Kikwit), Rickem Jazz de Boma, Singa Mwambe de Kisangani, Jazz Baron, Bamboula, Diamant Bleu, Les As, Festival des Maquisards, Les Grands Maquisards, Continental, G.O. Malebo, African Fiesta National, African Fiesta Sukisa, Volcan ni Beto Ba, Bella Bella, Vévé, Lipua Lipua, Sosoliso, Lovy du Zaïre, and many others.

In 1969, a collective of students, spearheaded by Papa Wemba, Jossart N'Yoka Longo, and Félix Manuaku Waku, emerged as Zaïko Langa Langa, introducing a third school of Congolese rumba, characterized by an unconventional structure, abrupt movements, and elements described as "jerky and complex in [their] basic contributions". The group was most influential in the 1970s, popularizing distinctive features such as variations in drum tempo, snare drum usage, sebène, and an entertainment ensemble comprising atalaku, a unified choir, a soloist, and soukous "shocked" dance, characterized by intricate body movements.

The subsequent fragmentation of Zaïko into numerous offshoot groups helped spread the "Zaïko style" throughout the Congolese music scene, particularly after the pivotal year of 1970, often referred to as the année-cavacha ("Year of Cavacha"). The popularity of this style helped shape the third school through bands such as Viva La Musica, Victoria Eleison, Isifi Lokole, Isifi, Yoka Lokole, Langa Langa Stars, Choc Stars, Antichoc, Grand Zaïko Wawa, and Quartier Latin International.

The band Wenge Musica emerged as the fourth school in the late 1980s and 1990s, with their rapid hip movements and body swaying, occasionally accompanied by abrupt gestures. Playing mainly soukous and Congolese rumba, they were instrumental in pioneering ndombolo dance music and dominated the scene until 1997, when the band split into two factions: Wenge Musica Maison Mère, led by Werrason, and Wenge BCBG, by JB Mpiana. Over the years, the ensemble spun off several musicians, including Héritier Watanabe, Fabregas Le Métis Noir, Robinio Mundibu, Ferré Gola, Tutu Callugi, Alain Mpela, Adolphe Dominguez, Marie Paul Kambulu, and Ricoco Bulambemba.

=== The Belgicain musical movement ===
Between 1964 and 1968, a new musical movement began to grow among Congolese students living in Belgium. Inspired by Congolese rumba and contemporary international musical trends of the time, these student bands developed a style that differed from the dominant musical currents in the Congo.

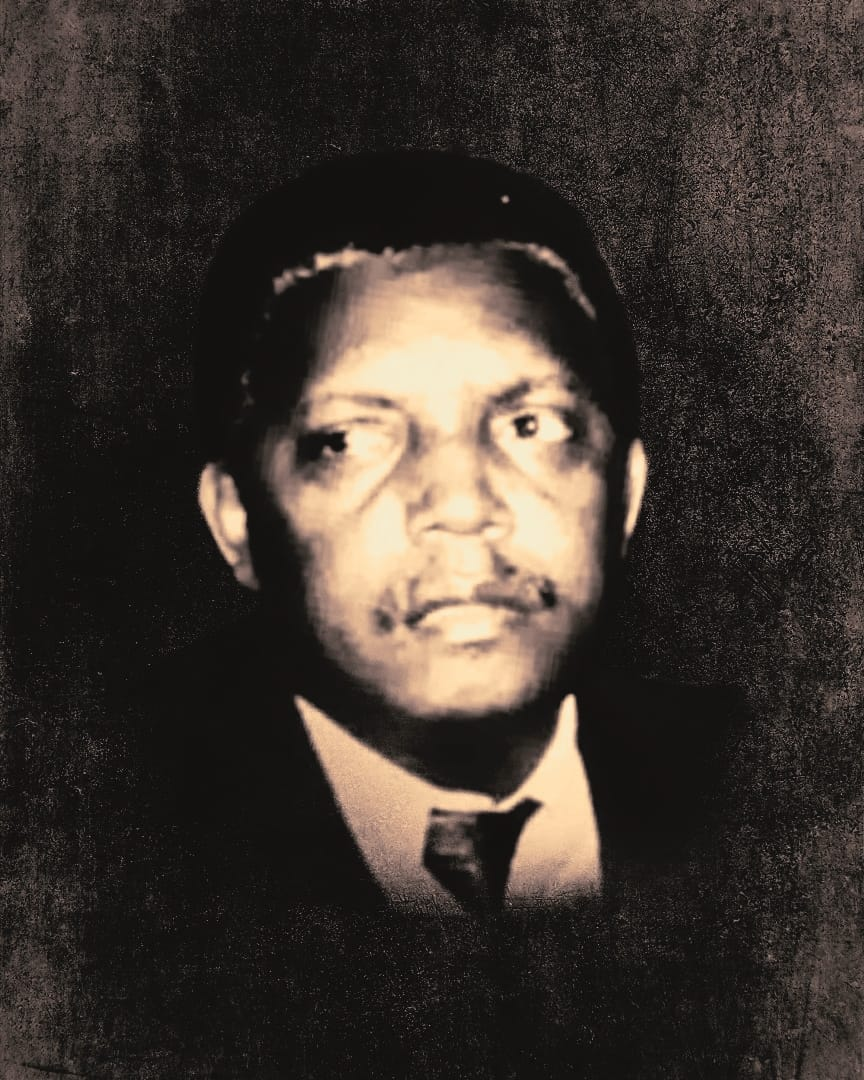
Portrait of Maxime Mongali

The first of these bands was Orchestre Yéyé National, founded in Brussels in July 1964 by guitarist Jean-Pierre Nimy Nzonga. The group brought together many Congolese students and musicians living in Belgium, including bandleader and singer Macaire Mangaya, as well as singers Louis Maxime Mongali, Oscar Nsukami Balkis, Isidore Nzanga Zizi, Antoine Bokito "Tony Dee", Roger Nimy "Bouboul", Léon Perry Bisengambi, Roger Kwamy Mambu Nzinga, Max Mayaka, and several instrumentalists. A few months later, in September 1964, guitarist François Bikoko formed Orchestre Afro Negro in Brussels. The band featured Philippe Kabuiku as its lead singer and bandleader, alongside other vocalists Mike Macauley, Antoine Tonio Diambu, Antoine Bokito "Tony Dee", and Denewade Tifour. The band's lineup also featured guitarists Julien N'damvu Douglas, Henri Milliex, Michel Galo, and Philémon Bongo "L'Ombre", along with clarinetist Boniface Matingu and tumba player Henri Pongo "Existo".

In 1965, the movement spread to Liège with the creation of Orchestre Los Nickelos by the Nzeza brothers, Félicien and Justin, together with Jules Ngole. François Kalala "Fafa" served as the group's bandleader while also playing the tumba. Its lineup included singers René Kasanda "Karé", Venant Kinzonzi "Zatho", Jean Maurice Bitumba, José Mubuala "Kelly", Antoine Bokito "Tony Dee", Isidore Nzanga Zizi, and Marc Banguli "Marco". The group also featured Paul Lieke, Camille Ntoya "Tocam", and Bernard Bokombe "Bébert" on bass guitar, Justin Mangubu on trumpet, Bernard Kandolo "Ben Akhan" on saxophone, Camille Azimba "Azin" on maracas, Freddos M'Firi as a salsa singer, and Jean Ndomatezo "Macchy" on guitar.

Several additional orchestras were established in 1966. These included Orchestre Diamant Bleu in Louvain, founded by lead guitarist Gaston Kanza; Orchestre Ekebo in Mons, founded by Pierre Ngalula; Orchestre Tropical in Charleroi; and Orchestre Paquita in Liège. Orchestre Ekebo later adopted the name Zaïko, several years before Zaïko Langa Langa was formed in Kinshasa. The last major group to emerge from this movement was Orchestre Africana, founded in Brussels in 1968. Its members included guitarist Omari, singers Marcus Mambwini and Teddy Kinsala, guitarist Freddy Mayaula, and bassist Adolphe Puati. Other student bands active during this period included Orchestre Banko and Orchestre Festival des Égales.

These bands became part of what was later called the "Belgicain" musical movement, a term used to describe Congolese musicians who built their careers while living or studying in Belgium. This tradition of student bands remained active for many years and continued well into the late 1970s and early 1980s. One of its final influential groups was Orchestre Bana Africa, based in Louvain-la-Neuve and led by Louis Leya, also known as Djo Lea, between 1979 and 1985.

The influence of the Belgicain style soon reached younger musicians in the Congo. Orchestre Thu Zaïna was the first notable group to appear, followed by Yss Boys, led by Claudy Tala-Ngai, Boni Tshimanga, Ray Lema, and others, whose music leaned more toward pop music. Jacques Pelasimba later formed Orchestre Les Mustang, while Vincent Lomboumier led Orchestre Les Saphirs. The worldwide popularity of yéyé music, promoted by singers such as Johnny Hallyday, Claude François, Richard Anthony, Françoise Hardy, Sheila, Sylvie Vartan, Frank Alamo, The Beatles, Fats Domino, and Bobby Solo, also attracted many Congolese teenagers. However, the influence of Belgium-based Congolese musicians remained especially noticeable in rumba music, and its impact could also be seen in the early development of Zaïko Langa Langa as the group worked to establish its own style.

=== Early 1960s, mi-solo, and soukous ===
It's really the ideal of what you can do with a song and a people—something that serves as an anthem, something you can dance to, and something that is remembered today, 60 years later, with immense emotion.

— Bertrand Dicale, a French musicologist, journalist, and writer, reviewing "Indépendance Cha Cha"

In the late years of colonial rule, many musicians sought to express their dissenting messages and daily tribulations through various forms of art, such as plastic arts, street theatre productions, literary compositions, and music. Lyrical content in Congolese rumba became more socially and politically charged. During the 1960 Belgo-Congolese Round Table Conference in Brussels, convened to discuss the impending independence of the Belgian Congo, Thomas Kanza, a civil servant at the European Common Market, arranged for Congolese musicians to perform at diplomatic and social events for the conference delegation. Before this, he had reached out to his brother Philippe in Léopoldville to enlist prominent Congolese performers. Kabasele responded by assembling artists from African Jazz and OK Jazz. African Jazz arrived in Brussels on 30 January 1960, marking the first appearance of a Congolese musical act and rumba band in the city. Since the conference had already opened on 20 January, they missed the initial events. Their debut performance occurred on 1 February at the Plaza Hotel during a gala known as Le Bal Congo or Le Bal de l'indépendance, organized by the newspaper Congo. The audience included political leaders from Congo and Belgium, African students, diplomats, athletes, and members of the African diaspora, and Flemish public television filmed the celebration. After introductory remarks by Philippe and Thomas Kanza, African Jazz played their Congolese rumba-infused song "Indépendance Cha Cha". Sung in Lingala, Kikongo, and French, the song quickly energized the crowd, who filled the dance floor. Delegates such as Patrice Lumumba and Joseph Kasa-Vubu appreciated hearing their names in the lyrics. The band played until dawn, earning unprecedented visibility among the Belgian audience. They reprised "Indépendance Cha Cha" on 20 February at the Plaza Hotel, during the conference's closing ceremony. It became a celebratory song of independence in various parts of French-speaking Africa and was played at events, festivities, and gatherings, especially when Congolese artists were present, due to its popularity among subsequent generations. According to Belgian researcher Matthias De Groof, "Indépendance Cha Cha" still stands today as a "symbol of the Congolese independence and Congolese rumba music". Around this time, OK Jazz released "Kingotolo Mbuta Ngani Mbote" in 1961 under Surboum African Jazz. In the song, Franco offered a critical portrayal of Belgian colonial administrators, accusing them of exploiting the Congolese population.

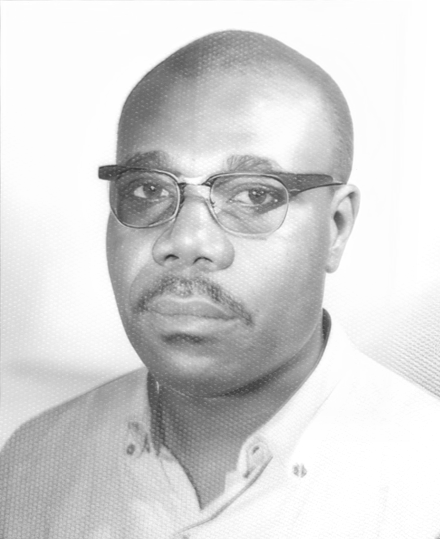
Cameroonian saxophonist Manu Dibango in 1964. His experiences in the Congo-Léopoldville during its independence greatly impacted his musical development.

Concurrently, Manu Dibango's exposure to Congolese rumba during the transition to independence helped shape his early career. At the Brussels club Les Anges Noirs, which was popular among Congolese politicians and intellectuals during the Round Table Conferences, Dibango made the acquaintance of Le Grand Kallé and subsequently joined African Jazz. Their collaborations yielded several successful recordings, including Dibango's participation in the "Indépendance Cha Cha" sessions in Léopoldville. Before returning to Cameroon in 1963, Dibango operated two nightclubs, the Afro-Négro and Tam-Tam, where he played various instruments including the piano, vibraphone, and saxophone. His performances, blending jazz with Congolese rumba, featured collaborations with local artists such as Brazzos, Faugus Izeidi, Franc Lassan, and Belgian drummer Charles Hénault. Dibango's 1962 recording "Twist à Léo", performed with local musicians under the name African Soul, introduced the international twist dance craze to Congolese audiences.

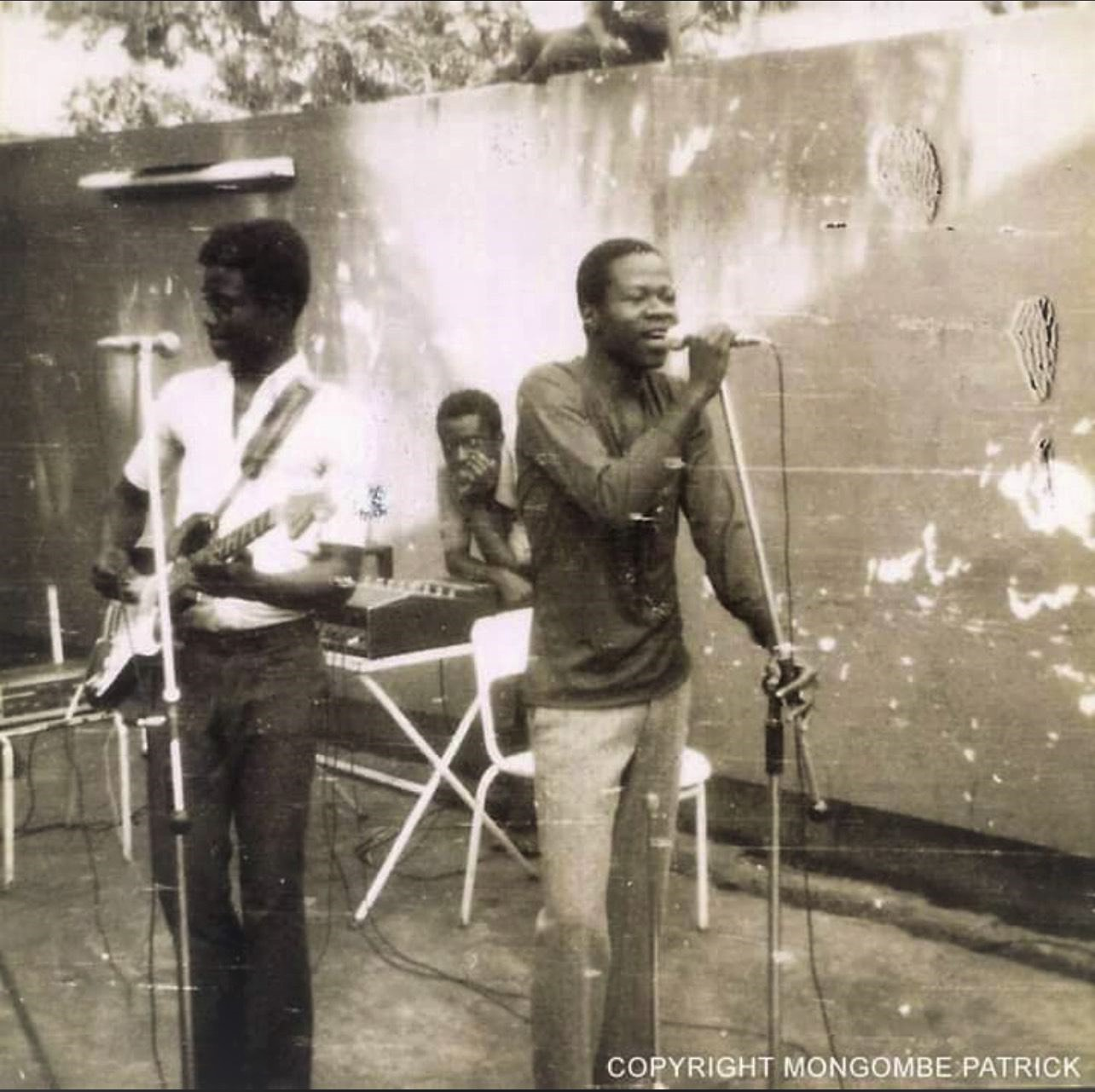
Papa Wemba and Félix Manuaku Waku performing in Kinshasa in 1970

By the latter half of 1960, Congolese rumba was an established genre in most of Central Africa, and it would also impact the music of South, West and East Africa. Certain artists who had performed in Franco Luambo and Grand Kalle's bands went on to establish their own ensembles, such as Tabu Ley Rochereau and Nico Kasanda, who formed African Fiesta in 1963. Kasanda's faction, including Charles Déchaud Mwamba, went on to create a new ensemble called African Fiesta Sukisa. Paradoxically, despite these schisms, many musicians continued to release records that dominated discos, bars, and clubs across Africa. In April 1966, Les Bantous de la Capitale and Ok Jazz became the first Congolese rumba bands to perform at the inaugural World Festival of Negro Arts in Dakar, Senegal. By 1967, African Fiesta Sukisa had assembled a powerhouse of vocalists and instrumentalists, but what set them apart were the three guitarists, Nico, his brother Dechaud, and De La France, who had become a defining characteristic of Congolese rumba. Les Bantous featured Gerry Gérard, Samba Mascott, and Mpassy Mermans, while Franco Luambo collaborated with Simaro Lutumba and Brazzos as well as several of its successors. Rochereau enlisted Jean Paul "Guvano" Vangu, Faugus Izeidi, and Johnny Bokasa in his Fiesta, and Dewayon worked with Ray Braynck and Henri Bowole in Cobantou. This practice gave rise to the term "mi-solo", to designate the third guitar, which played between the solo (lead) guitar and the (rhythm) accompaniment. Subsequently, Rochereau and Roger Izeidi departed from the band to establish African Fiesta National. Others, such as Mujos and Depuissant, left to join different musical collectives; they were later joined by Papa Wemba and Sam Mangwana. In July–August 1969, Les Bantous de la Capitale and the Bamboula Orchestra were among the musicians participating in the Premier Festival Culturel Panafricain d'Alger, a celebration of African identity and culture to facilitate interaction between liberation movements and promoting the newly independent Algeria as a continental leader.

While Congolese rumba exerted influence on bands such as African Jazz and OK Jazz, a band from Brazzaville, Orchestre Sinza Kotoko, sought to attenuate this influence and embrace a faster-paced soukous style, starting in 1966. This emergent style was based on traditional festive Congolese rhythms, as the group often performed at weddings and malaki (communal cultural festivities). This new variant of Congolese rumba, with its percussive bass mimicking percussion, was notable for its emphasis on sebène, designed to get listeners dancing. Unlike rumba songs, which contained a story sung before the sebène, soukous songs omitted the story in favor of the dance. Meanwhile, rumba bands like Zaïko Langa Langa introduced distinct elements into the genre, including variances in percussive tempo, utilization of snare drums, a new sebène guitar technique, and a performance ensemble comprising atalaku, a harmonized choir, and a soloist. Soukous achieved international prominence as numerous musicians moved abroad during the late 1970s due to the economic downturn in Zaire. Other Zairean artists, such as Tabu Ley Rochereau, Mbilia Bel, Kanda Bongo Man, Pépé Kallé, Syran Mbenza, Franklin Boukaka, Bozi Boziana, Evoloko Jocker, Rigo Star, Josky Kiambukuta, Diblo Dibala, Jolie Detta, Dindo Yogo, Gaby Lita Bembo, and Koffi Olomide garnered substantial followings in the United States, Europe, and across Africa.

=== 1970s, the Paris scene, and cavacha ===
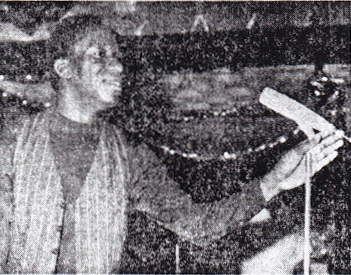
Tabu Ley Rochereau performing at the Paris Olympia in 1970

During the 1970s, a considerable contingent of prominent Zairean musicians moved to Paris due to economic hardship and the country's underdeveloped music industry. In December 1970, Tabu Ley Rochereau became the first Congolese rumba artist and the first African artist to headline one of Paris's major concert venues, the Olympia. Despite concerns about how the French audience would receive their music, the concert was a success and significantly boosted Rochereau's international career. The performance spurred the venue to book other Zairean musicians, including Abeti Masikini, on 19 February 1973, which significantly elevated her status back in Zaire.

Life in Kinshasa became increasingly difficult under Zairianization (or Authenticité in French), a state ideology introduced in November 1973 by President Mobutu Sese Seko that forced foreign-owned companies to transfer control of key sectors of the economy, such as agriculture, trade, and transportation, to Congolese ownership. Zairianization had an immediate and damaging effect on the music industry, as record labels in Kinshasa struggled to get the raw materials needed to press vinyl records, while pirated cassettes and albums from Nairobi "filtered into the local market". Cassette tapes, particularly pirated ones, eroded more legitimate forms of music production and distribution, and the copyright office remained relatively ineffective. Before 1973, Kinshasa could sell as many as five million records annually, but those figures rapidly declined after Zairianization and subsequent policies like radicalization and retrocession. Together with widespread corruption and economic mismanagement, these changes weakened the national economy and pushed many people, including musicians, to seek opportunities abroad. Some, including Le Grand Kallé, Bovick Bondo Gala, Armando Ama, and Seskain Molenga, migrated to France.

Congolese rumba and soukous consequently garnered acclaim across the Western world and the Caribbean during this epoch. Notably, Joséphine M'boualé, alias Joséphine Bijou, emerged as the first Congolese rumba female guitarist to perform in Havana in early 1974, followed by the orchestra Les Bantous de la Capitale in 1974, 1975, and 1978.

The three-day Zaire 74 music festival emphasized the significance of internationalism in music in Africa and beyond. It featured American artists like James Brown, B. B. King, Bill Withers, and the Spinners, as well as international ones like Celia Cruz, Miriam Makeba, and Zairian musicians like Tabu Ley Rochereau, Abeti Masikini, Franco Luambo & OK Jazz, and Zaïko Langa Langa. Alongside acts of cultural diplomacy like Sister Sledge teaching young African girls how to dance the bump, Americans and other Westerners witnessed and celebrated the musical performances and genres of Congolese and other African artists that thrilled local populations.

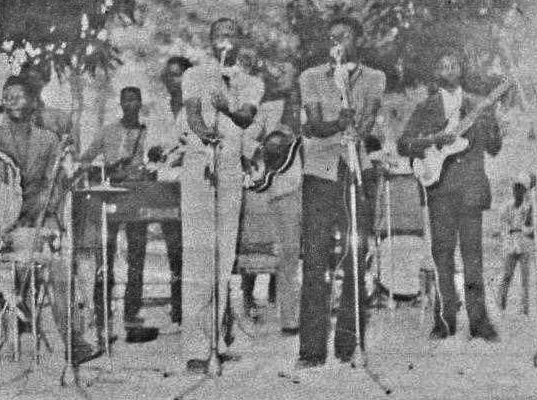
Zaïko Langa Langa performance in 1971. From left to right: Beaudoin Mitsho, Meridjo Belobi (behind), Enoch Zamuangana (behind), Teddy Sukami, Papa Wemba, Damien Ndebo (behind), Evoloko Jocker, Félix Manuaku Waku

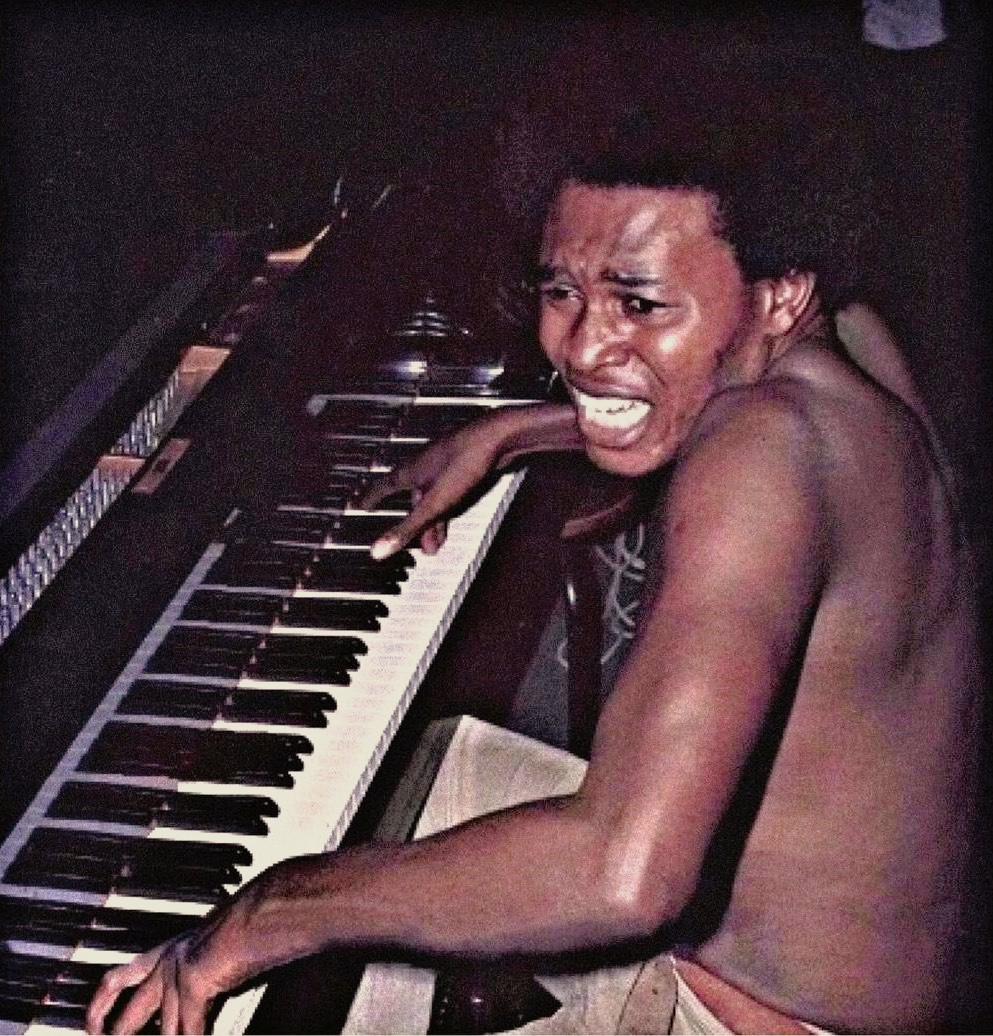
Gaby Lita Bembo playing piano in the 1970s

By the late 1970s, a wave of Zairean musicians began to make their way to Paris. Some went for short recording stays, while others made it a permanent base. Péla Nsimba, a guitarist and singer who had garnered acclaim in Zaire during the late 1960s and early 1970s with his ensemble Thu Zahina, arrived in 1977. The emergence of specialized record stores catering to African music burgeoned in the mid-1970s, exemplified by Afric Music in Montparnasse. In 1976, Eddy Gustave, a jazz musician from Martinique, opened a record shop near Père Lachaise Cemetery, where he sold Caribbean and African music. In 1978, Gustave moved into production and began inviting musicians from Zaire to come to Paris to record.

Meanwhile, in Africa, Zaïko Langa Langa became "the leader of a new generation of orchestras". The band's drummer, Meridjo Belobi, gained popularity and is credited for inventing a dance craze named cavacha, rooted in the Congolese traditional rhythm.

=== 1980s, Paris, and kwassa kwassa ===
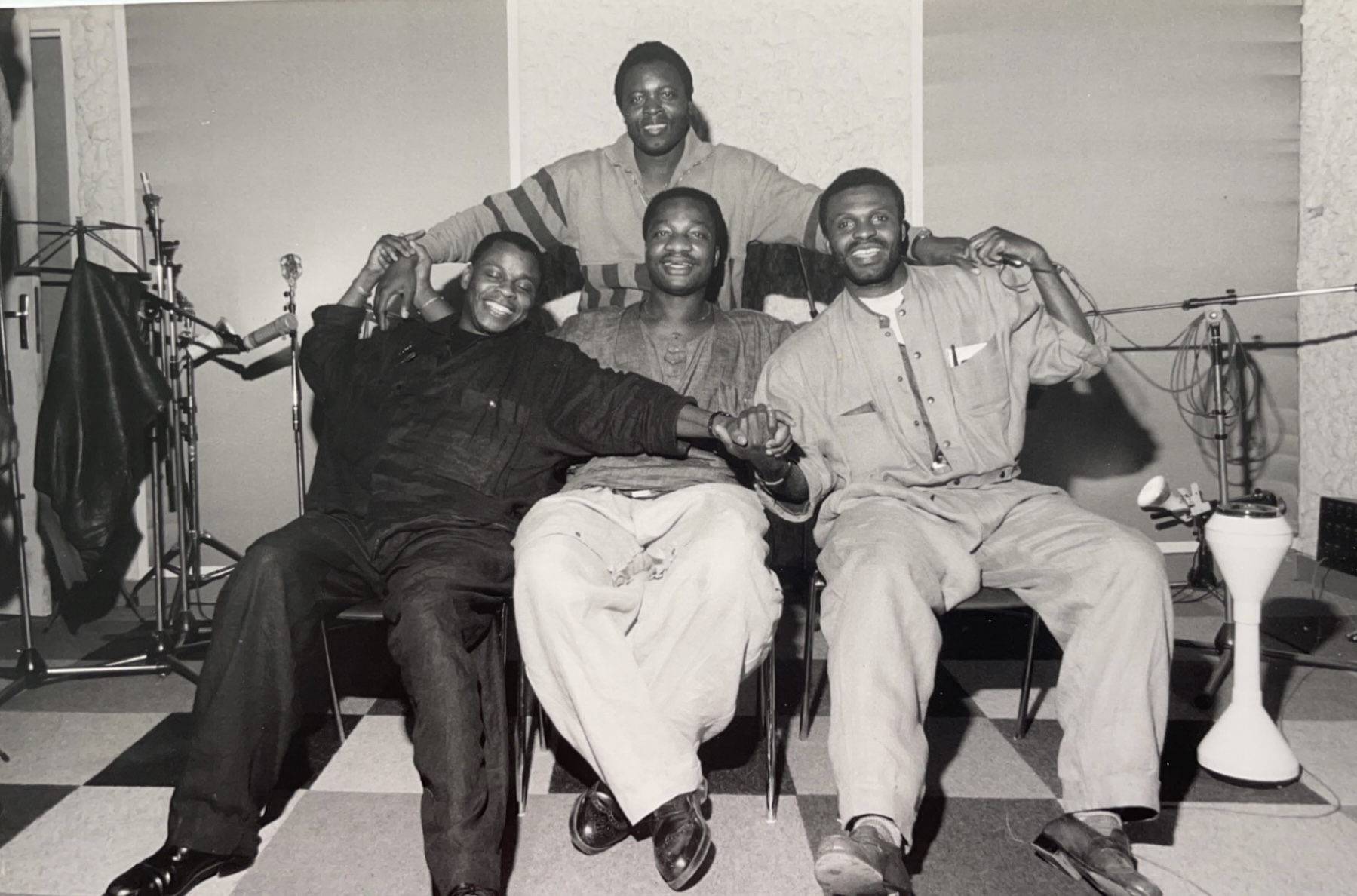
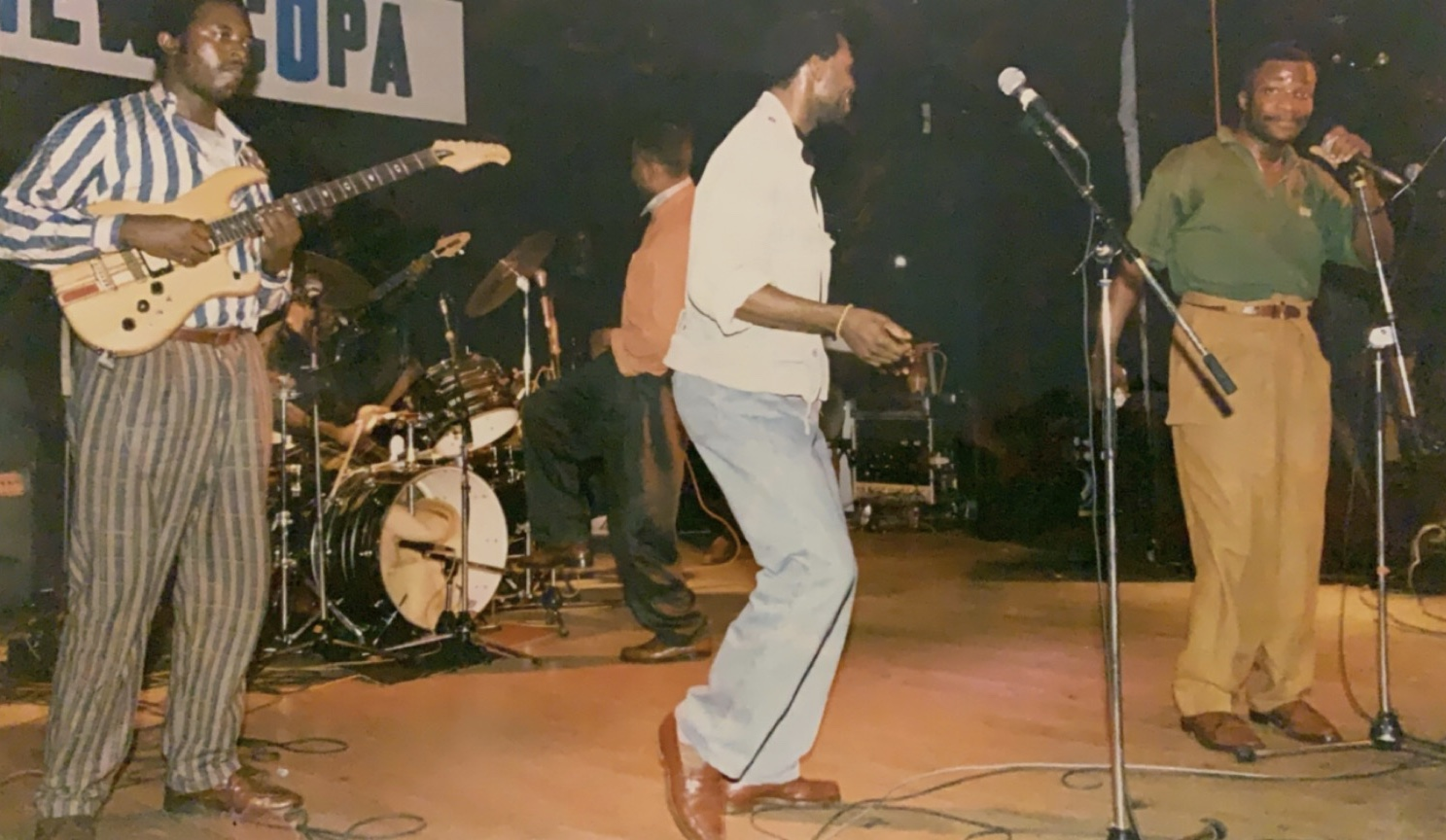
The Loketo group, established by Aurlus Mabélé and Diblo Dibala, emerged as a prominent soukous band during the 1980s and 1990s.

With increasing sociopolitical upheaval in Zaire in the 1980s, numerous musicians sought refuge in Tanzania, Kenya, Uganda, and Colombia, and a significant number migrated to Paris, Brussels, and London. However, throughout this period, Franco Luambo's music became an integral component of Mobutu's political propaganda. Luambo composed a Congolese rumba breakout song titled "Candidat Na Biso Mobutu" ("our candidate Mobutu") in support of Mobutu's contrived presidential re-election campaign (where Mobutu was the sole candidate) in 1984. The song exhorted Zairean citizens to "Shout loud like thunder/For the Marshal's candidacy/Mobutu Sese Seko", while warning the central committee to "beware of sorcerers", a euphemism for those opposing the dictator. The record earned Luambo a gold disc for one million units sold.

Paris emerged as a hub for soukous musicians, serving as a crossroads where other African and European music styles, synthesizers, and production values could feed into the sound. Consequently, soukous garnered an eclectic international following, with Zairean performers in Paris and London navigating the demands of European, African, and Caribbean markets. Artists like Papa Wemba profited from an international following that praised his musical compositions. With the growing international popularity of soukous in the 1980s, lyrics began to deal with a broader range of topics not limited to life in the DRC and the Republic of the Congo. In 1985, Luambo and OK Jazz, now rebranded as TPOK Jazz, released their Congolese rumba-infused album Mario, which enjoyed immediate success, with the eponymous hit single achieving gold certification after selling over 200,000 copies in Zaire. The song became one of Luambo's most significant hits. Zaïko Langa Langa subsequently became the first Congolese band to appear on TF1 in 1987, during a television show presented by Christophe Dechavanne. In June 1987, the band became finalists in the Référendum RFI Canal tropical, securing second place among Afro-Caribbean groups, behind Kassav. Meanwhile, Les Bantous de la Capitale became the favored Congolese rumba orchestra of Gabonese president Omar Bongo, receiving an official invitation to perform during the 20th-anniversary celebrations of Renovation Day in Libreville, held in March 1988.

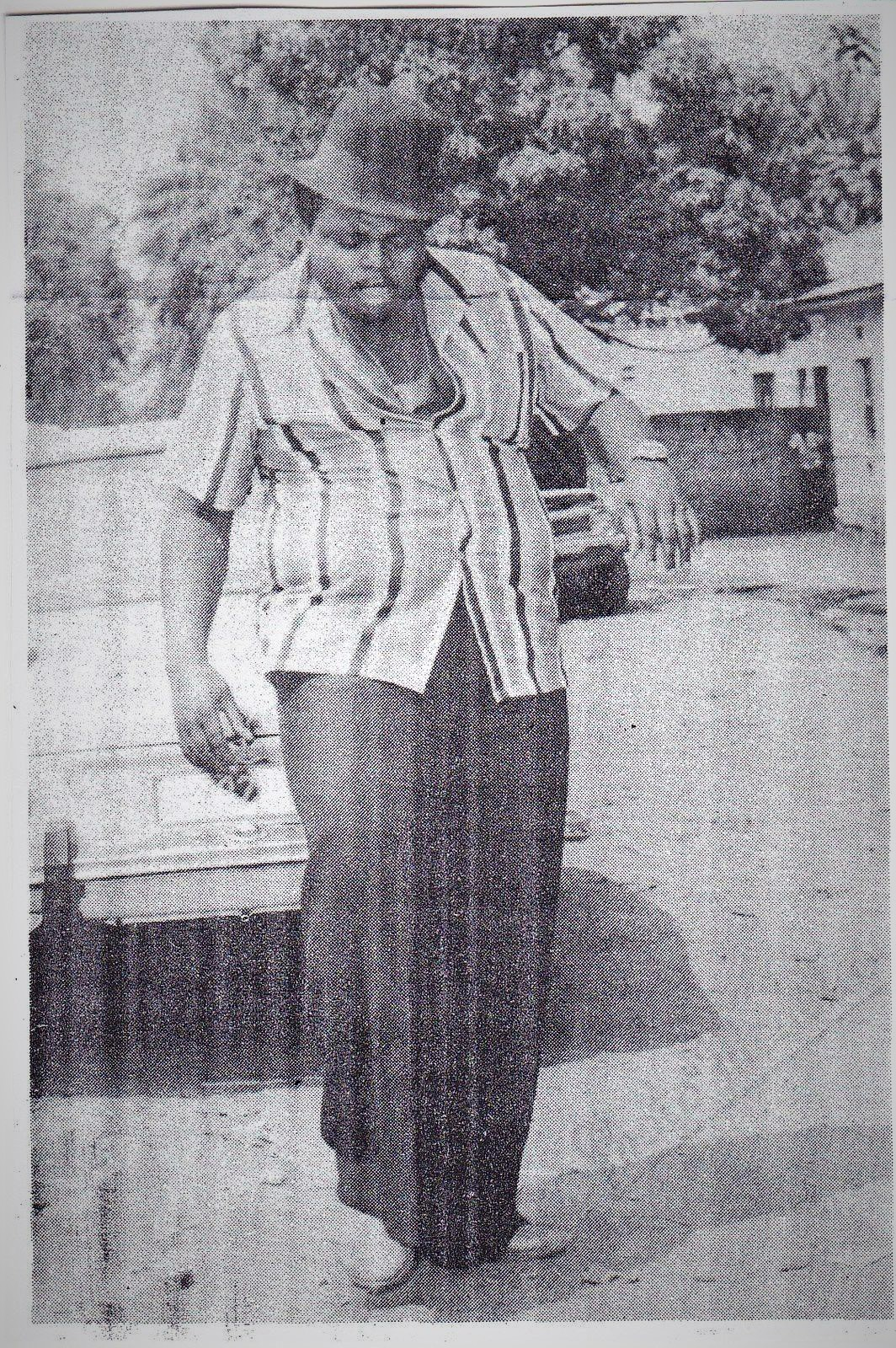
A poster of Pépé Kallé in 1978

Concurrently, Congolese choreographer Jeanora pioneered a dance form called kwassa kwassa, a dance step within the soukous style (with kwassa serving as a playful allusion to the French interrogative "C'est quoi ça?" – "What's that?"). This dance form was adopted by many artists and was notably popularized by Kanda Bongo Man and Abeti Masikini, during her performance at the Zenith de Paris.

Pépé Kallé and his band Empire Bakuba, co-founded with Papy Tex, rose to prominence across Africa with their stripped-down, baritone, and high-octane renditions of Luambo and Rochereau's music, earning Pépé Kallé nicknames such as "La Bombe Atomique" (borrowed from Empire Bakuba's self-titled album) and "the Elephant of Zaire", due to his impressive size and performance style. His music often featured intricate guitar work and vibrant rhythms, hallmarks of soukous, aiding in the genre's popularization on both continental and international stages. Nevertheless, Kallé further distinguished himself with his use of double entendre, deploying incisive commentary on the everyday challenges faced by his compatriots.

=== Ndombolo ===
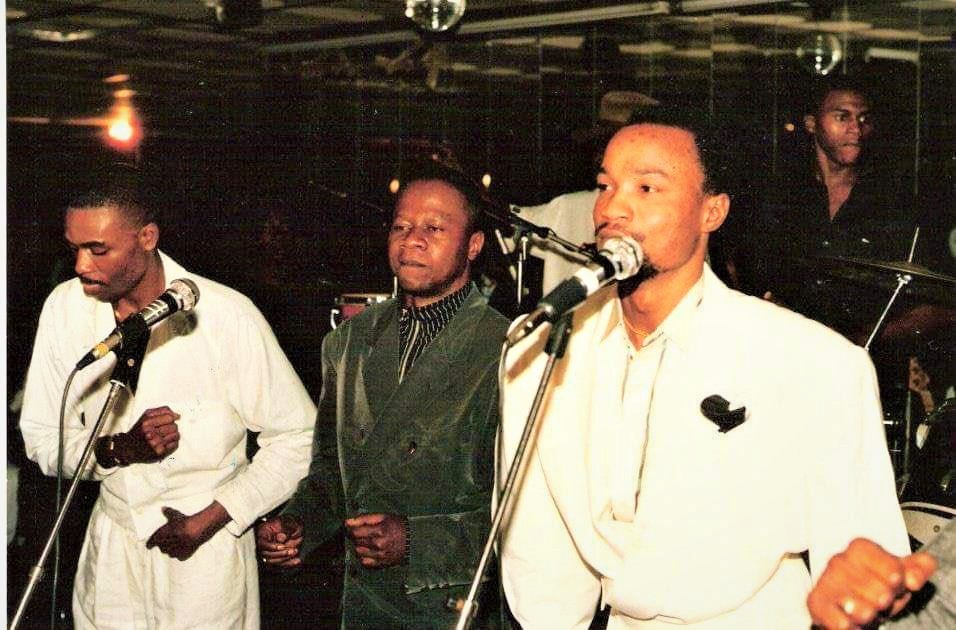
Koffi Olomide and Papa Wemba performing in 1988

Emerging at the end of the 1990s and drawing inspiration from Congolese rumba and soukous, ndombolo became a popular and danceable fast-paced, hip-swaying dance music in Africa. Defined by its spirited sébéné or "heated part", ndombolo featured vocal entertainment by atalakus and swirling guitar riffs. Although initiated by Radja Kula in 1995, it was notably popularized and refined in the 1990s by Wenge Musica and Koffi Olomide.

=== 21st century ===
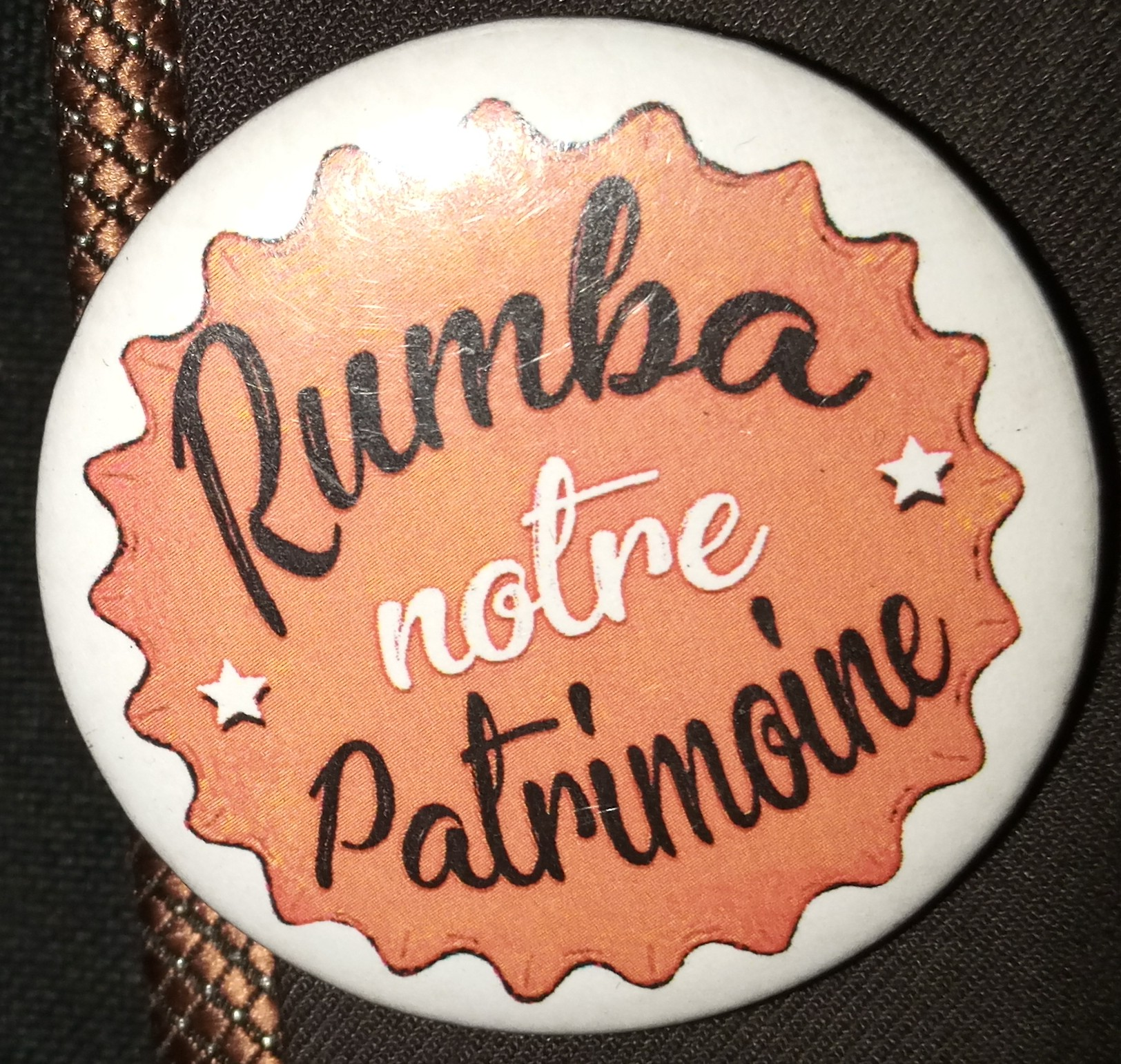
The addition Congolese rumba as UNESCO's Intangible Cultural Heritage of Humanity

In December 2021, Congolese rumba was added to the UNESCO Representative List of the Intangible Cultural Heritage of Humanity.

Congolese rumba is a musical genre and a dance used in formal and informal spaces for celebration and mourning. It is primarily an urban practice danced by a male-female couple. Performed by professional and amateur artists, the practice is passed down to younger generations through neighbourhood clubs, formal training schools and community organisations. The rumba is considered an integral part of Congolese identity and a means of promoting intergenerational cohesion and solidarity.

— UNESCO, news release

== Women in Congolese rumba ==
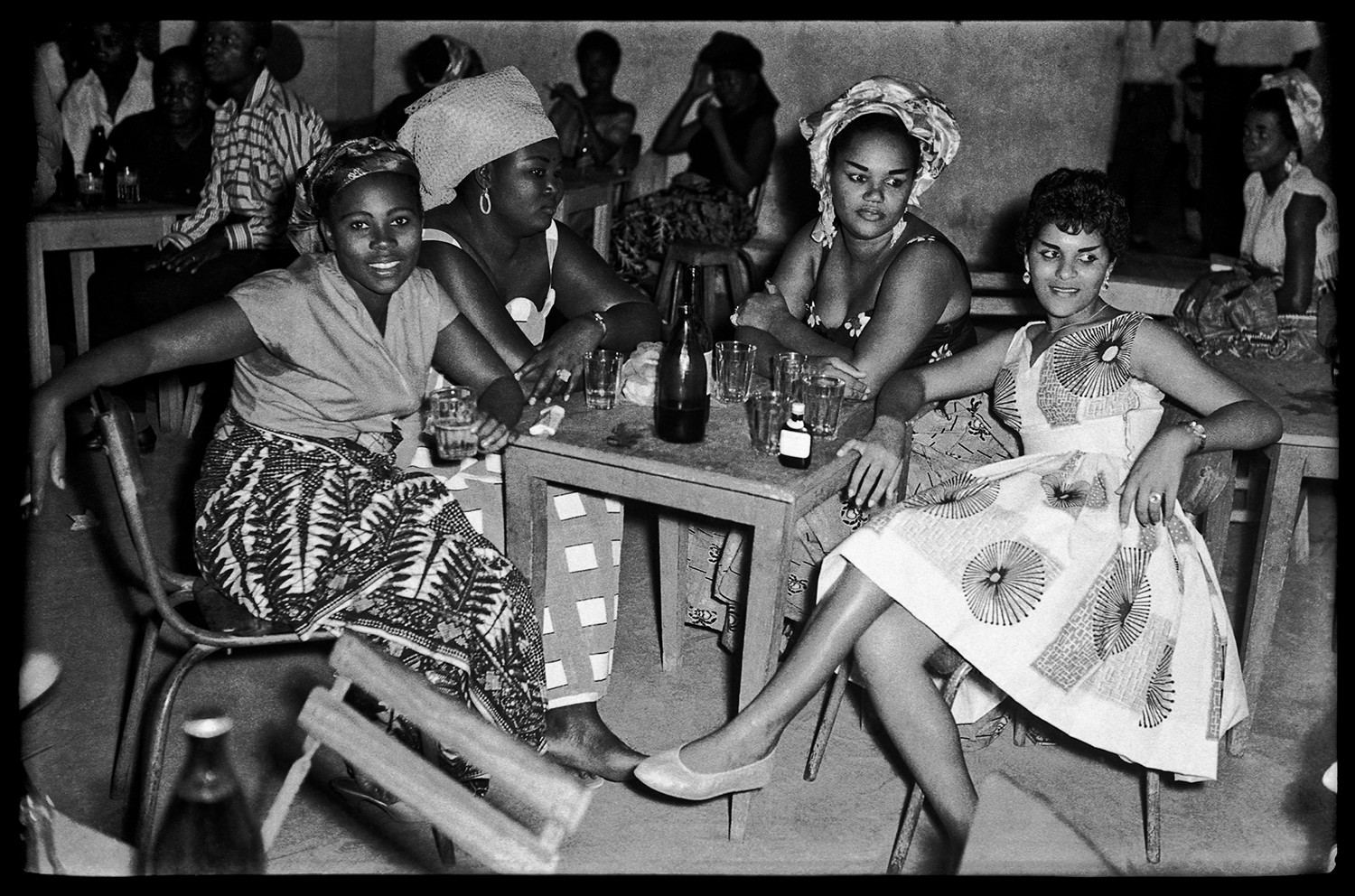
Women in a Congolese rumba barroom

While the genre's influence reverberated throughout Africa, the spectacle of female artists taking the stage and expressing their melodic abilities was a rarity, as song composition and performance were predominantly the domain of male artists. In the 1930s, up-and-coming female vocalists like Nathalie and Emma Louise laid the groundwork for the emergence of female artists in Kinshasa and Brazzaville. Despite remaining largely anonymous due to limited documentation, they are regarded as prominent figures in the Congolese music scene. In the 1940s, artists such as Gabrielle Maleka and Anne Mbassou made significant contributions to the evolving sound of Congolese rumba as part of Paul Kamba's Victoria Brazza ensemble. By the 1950s, women singers emerged as powerful voices with momentous messages about amorous entanglements, protection, and ordinary struggles, and successes. Martha Badibala, Tekele Mokango, Anne Ako, Ester Sudila, Léonine Mbongo, Joséphine Sambeya, Jeanne Ninin, Pauline Lisanga, and Caroline Mpia became influential in sculpting the genre during this transformative epoch. Marie Kitoto emerged as one of the most prominent female voices of the time. Her collaborations with guitarist and bandleader Henri Bowane resulted in several popular recordings, including "Yo Kolo Ye Kele" and "Ya Bisu Se Malembe", both recorded on 11 September 1951. Other successful songs from their collaboration include "Chérie Kanga Vélo" and "Sebene Ta Sika" (1950), as well as "Monoko Ya Mboka Ya Tembe" and "Amba Louise" (1951). Kitoto's vocal tone, particularly her rich bass register, earned her the moniker of a "femme fatale". Lucie Eyenga also rose to prominence during this period. Initially known for her work with African Jazz, she later became associated with Rock-a-Mambo. Despite her popularity, Lucie Eyenga was not primarily recognized as a vocalist but as the hostess of female recreational associations, occasionally performing in bars.

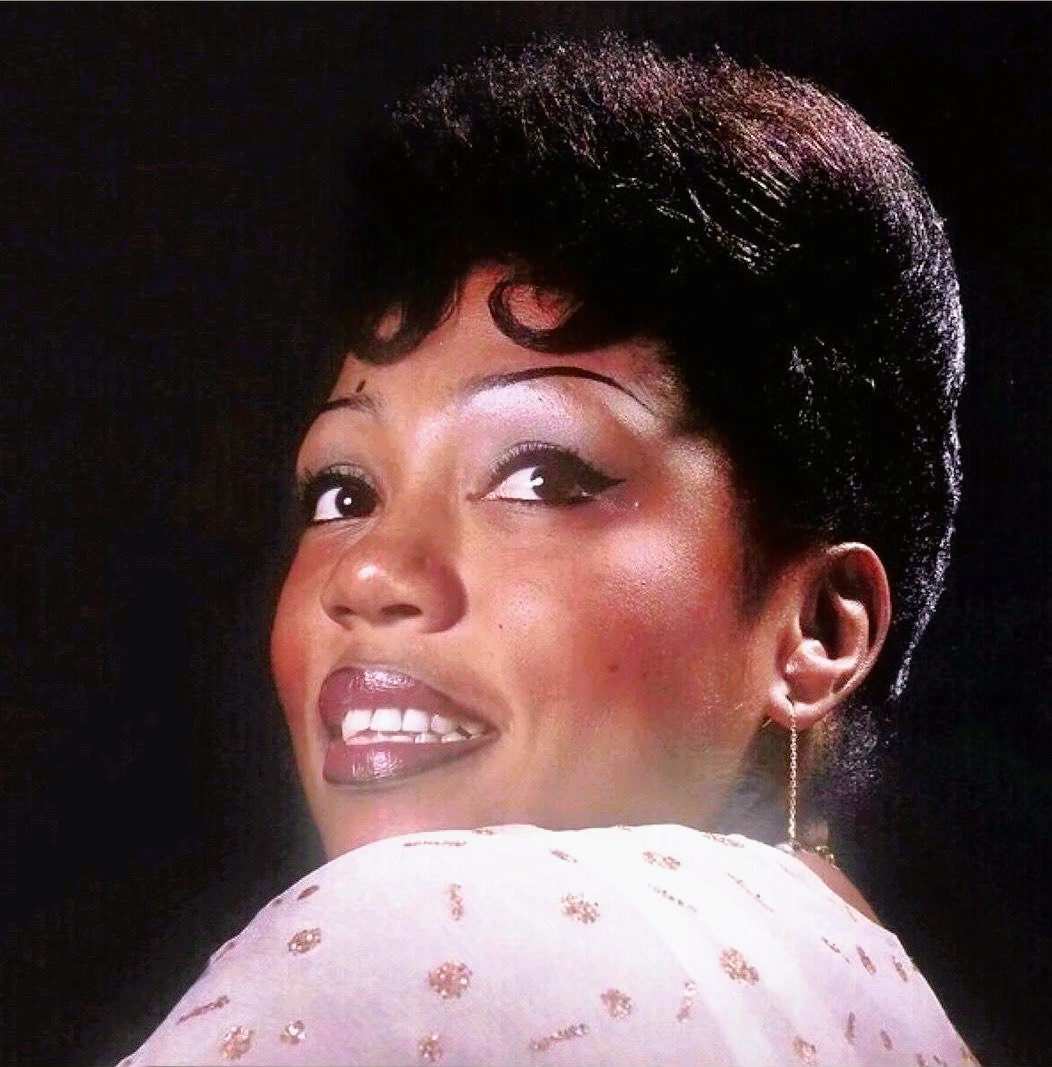
Abeti Masikini in 1978

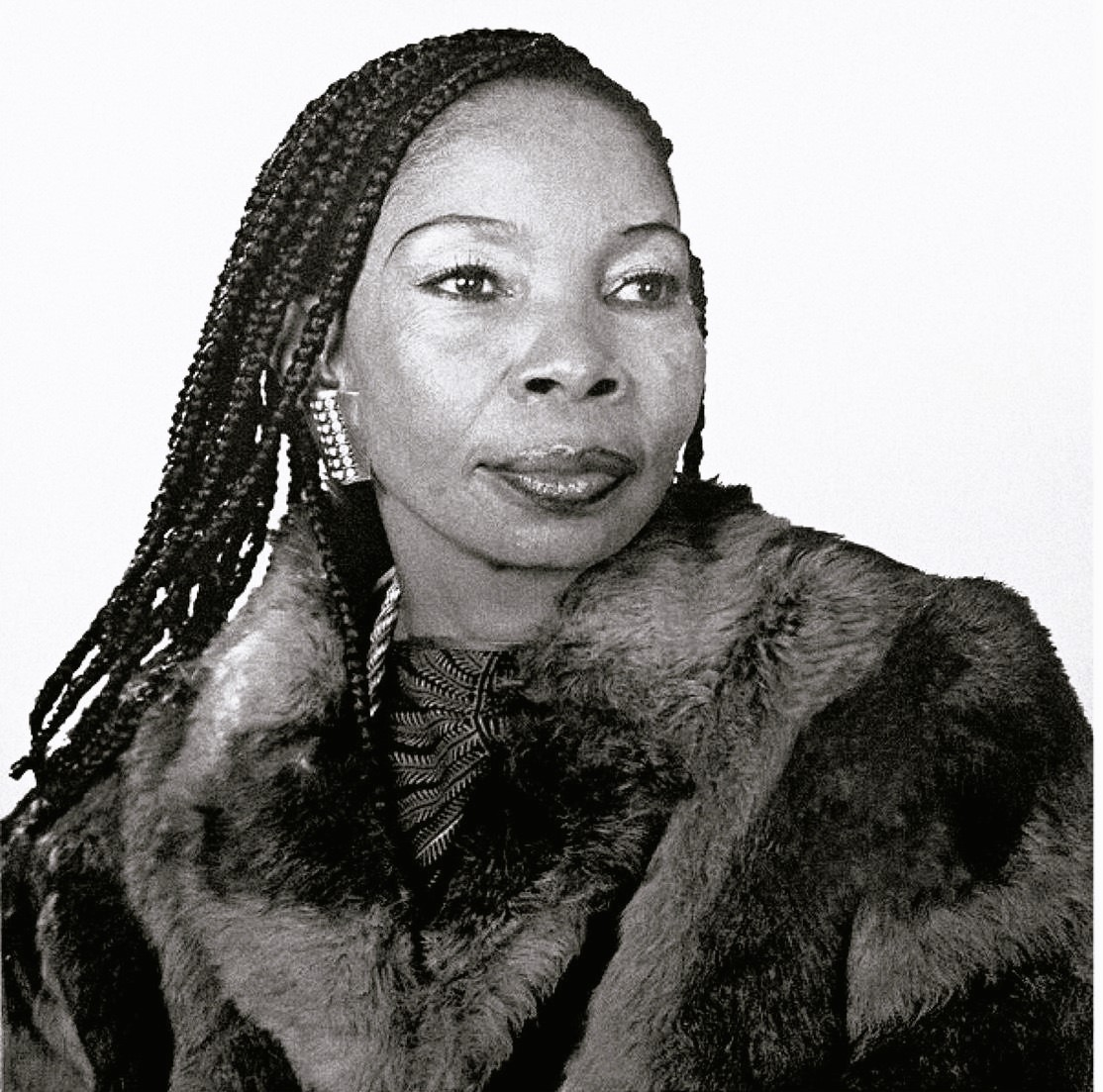
Lucie Eyenga, 1984

Throughout the metamorphosing musical terrain, women persistently occupied crucial positions in various studios and record labels. Cameroonian singer Marcelle Ebibi, for instance, introduced electric guitar rhythms to the genre with her opus "Mama é", chaperoned by her fiancé Guy Léon Fylla and Belgian guitarist Bill Alexandre. In the 1970s, Abeti Masikini and her band Les Tigresses gained critical acclaim for their performance at the Olympia Hall in Paris in 1973 and Carnegie Hall in New York in June 1974, and sharing the stage with James Brown, Miriam Makeba, Tabu Ley Rochereau, Franco Luambo, among others, during the Zaire 74 music festival. Abeti's second album, La voix du Zaire, l'idole de l'Afrique, released in 1975, with hits such as "Likayabo", "Yamba Yamba", "Kiliki Bamba", "Naliku Penda", and "Ngoyaye Bella Bellow", elevated her popularity, especially in West Africa. Her band, Les Redoutables, served as a launching pad for numerous female and male musicians, including Mbilia Bel, Lokua Kanza, and Tshala Muana. Another prominent female artist of this era was Marie Bélè, alias "Marie Bella", who infused Congolese rumba with interpretations of her ethnic folklore rhythms from the Congo Basin Department. Her critically acclaimed hits "Ofini A Tsenguè" and "Itouyi Kambi", recorded across Africa and China, garnered substantial popularity. She was a participant in the 1977 second edition of the World Festival of Black Arts in Lagos, Nigeria, accompanied by Joséphine Bijou and Carmen Essou.

Joséphine Bijou emerged as a prominent female singer-guitarist from Congo-Brazzaville, known for her "rumba-folk" performances that combined traditional influences with dynamic stage presence. Throughout the 1970s, she enchanted audiences with her guitar riffs and inventive fusion of jazz tempos and high-energy sequences. Her visit to Havana in 1974 symbolized a cultural exchange that reinforced the historical link between Congolese and Cuban music, making her the first Congolese artist to perform in Cuba. That same year, the sisters Yondo Nyota and Yondo Sister broke onto the music scene after being recruited by Tabu Ley Rochereau into Orchestre Afrisa International, where they performed the hit "Leridy" (alternatively titled "Leridie"). In 1976, M'Pongo Love released "Pas Possible Mati", which is often regarded as one of the best female-composed works in Congolese rumba, and followed it in 1977 with "Ndaya" and "Kapwepwe". Isa La Fleur d'Afrique gained visibility in 1978 after joining Father Buffalo's Orchestre Minzoto Wella-Wella as a backing vocalist, dancer, and actress. Two years later, Mbilia Bel joined Sam Mangwana's backing group and later Orchestre Afrisa International, in 1981, where she rose to fame through a string of hits: "Mpeve Ya Longo", "Yamba Ngai", "Eswi Yo Wapi", "Nakei Nairobi", "Boya Ye", "Shauri Yako", "La Beauté D'Une Femme", and "Beyanga", before launching her solo career in 1987.

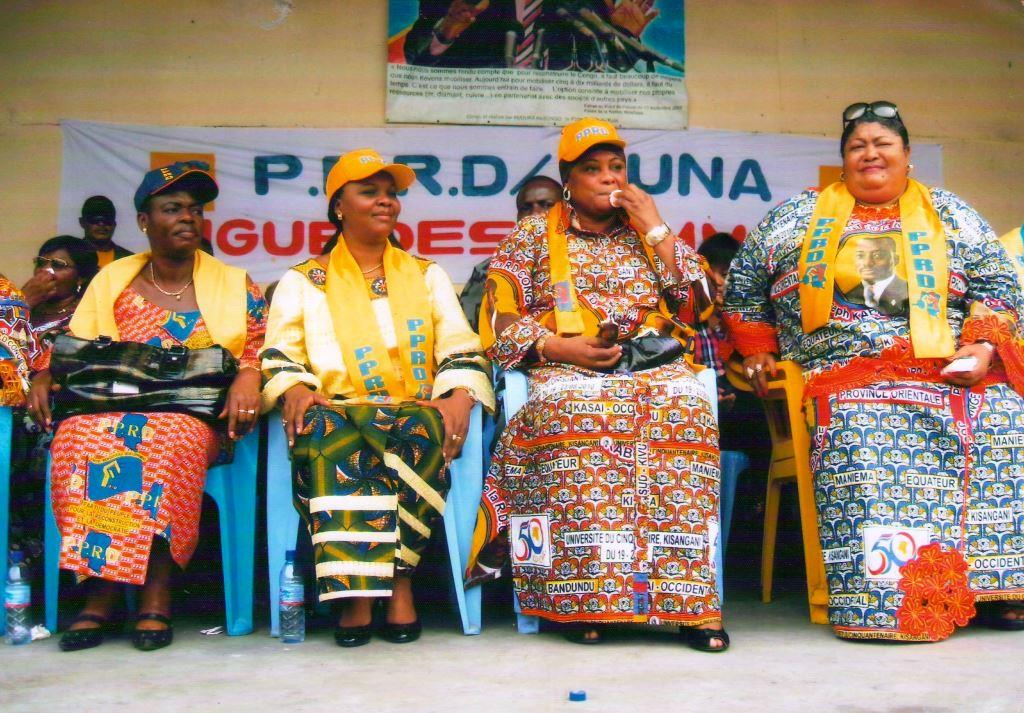
Tshala Muana (second from right) in Kinshasa, 2014

In 1982, Congo-Brazzaville singer Pembey Sheiro made her debut at the age of 19 with a debut album guided by Charles Tchicou, who composed songs such as "Alabatsimane", "Konde", "Le Sanza", and "Boloko", and the duo later found success with the 1984 album Ba pasi ya mokili. In 1983, Antoinette Etisomba Lokindji moved to France, where she performed Christian music with Bastia Nama, a former member of Bobongo Stars and son of a high-ranking Salvation Army official. Meanwhile, Michaëlle Mountouari, daughter of Pierre Moutouari, launched her career the same year, while Meta Beya was discovered in Kinshasa by M. Amouzoud, who produced Amouzoud Naleli Yo, a 12-inch vinyl featuring her alongside musicians from Bobongo Stars. In 1984, Tshala Muana recorded the eponymous album Tshala Muana for the Safari Ambiance label, which was arranged by Souzy Kasseya and helped popularize the mutuashi rhythm, a traditional Luba dance characterized by pronounced hip movements. Her 1985 Tshiluba-language hit "M'Pokolo" (alternatively "Le Petit Ruisseau"), arranged by Aladji Touré, boosted her popularity, while her 1987 rendition of Mayaula Mayoni's "Nasi nabali" also dominated airwaves, followed by the East African success of her soukous hit "Karibu Yangu" later that year.

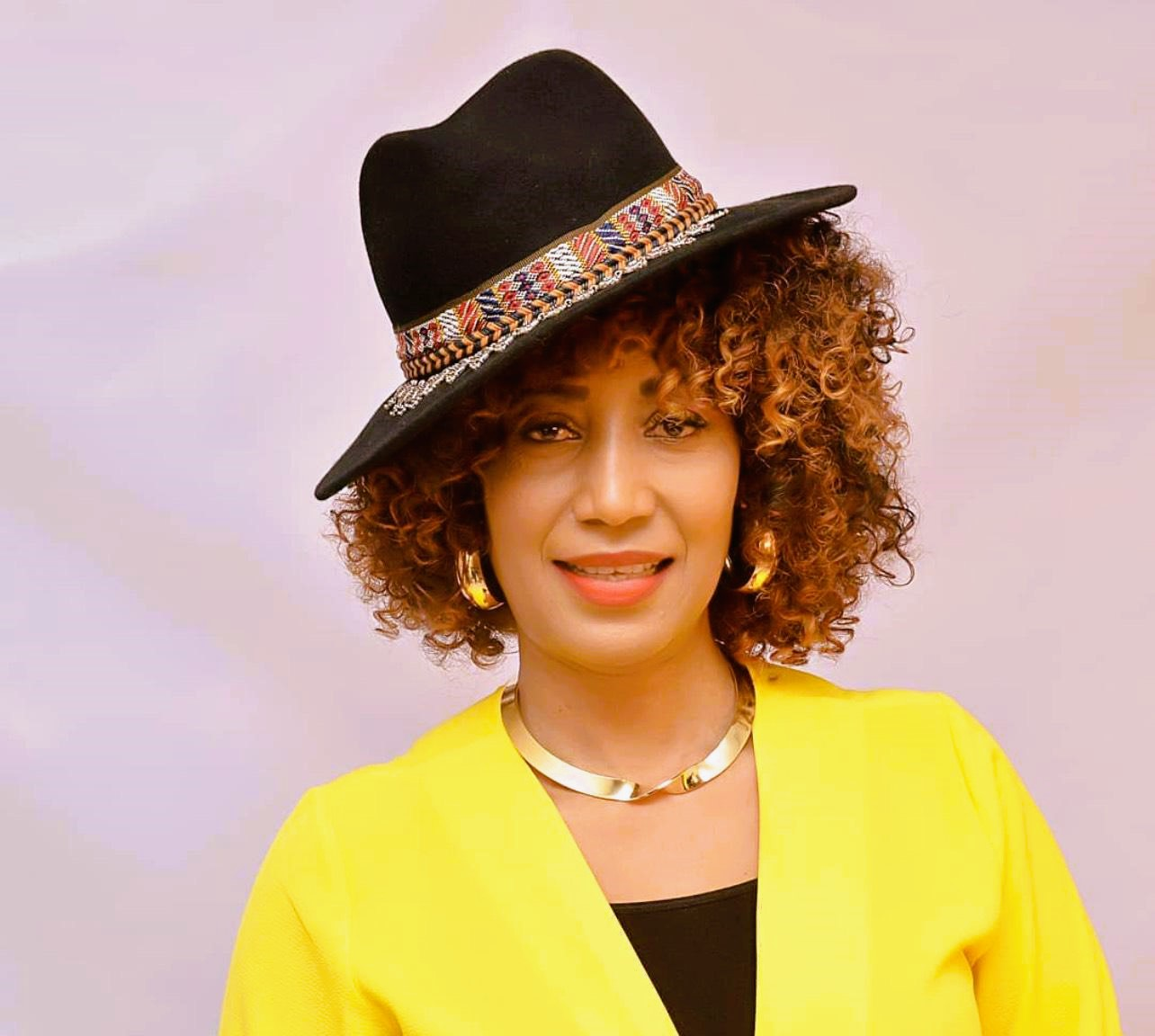
Jolie Detta (pictured here in 2019) is best known for her influential role in Congolese rumba in the 1980s.

The Abidjan-based Congolese singer Mamhy Claudia launched her career in the 1980s and later found success with her 1992 album Okana ngai. Around the same time, Baniel Bambo and Nana Akumu rose to prominence after being recruited by Franco into TPOK Jazz in 1986 and contributed vocals to several hits, like "C'est dur la vie d'une femme célibataire", "Je vis avec le P.D.G", "Flora", "Une femme difficile", and "Les ont dit", all of which were composed by Franco and Simaro Lutumba, in collaboration with TPOK Jazz. That year also saw the creation of the all-female band Taz Bolingo by businessman Ndaye Fano. In 1987, Déesse Mukangi joined Bozi Boziana's Anti-Choc at the age of eighteen and gained early recognition, before relocating to France in 1991, where she released multiple albums, including Petite Déesse in 1992. She later briefly collaborated with Les Redoutables and, in 2000, she lent her voice to Général Défao's album Nessy de London.

Faya Tess gained attention in 1986 after joining Orchestre Afrisa International, and she contributed to the albums Nadina and Moto akokufa, before beginning her solo career in 2000. Jolie Detta achieved national recognition the same year after becoming the lead vocalist of TPOK Jazz, notably through the collaborative EP Le Grand Maitre Franco et son Tout Puissant O.K. Jazz et Jolie Detta, with Franco and Simaro Lutumba, which included the hits "Massu", "Cherie Okamuisi Ngai", "Layile", and "Likambo Ya Somo Lumbe". Abby Surya, who began as a dancer with Les Redoutables, transitioned into a singing career after moving to Côte d'Ivoire in 1985, issuing her debut album in 1990. She later experimented with a soul-inflected Congolese rumba style in her 2006 release Bokila.

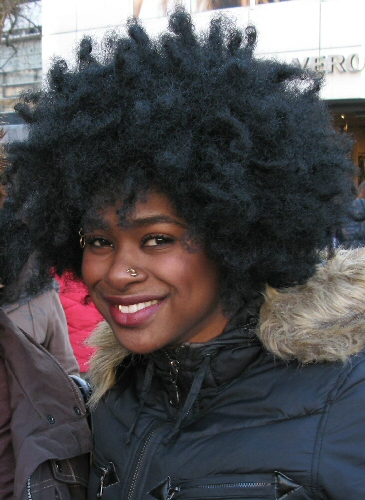
Nathalie Makoma, lead vocalist of Makoma, a family-based Christian music group.

Concurrently, alongside secular Congolese rumba, Christian-infused renditions of the genre emerged as an avenue of female expression. Musicians such as Makoma, Charles Mombaya, Brother Kabatshi, Brother Mente, Paul Balenza, the Couple Buloba, Dénis Ngonde, Kool Matopé, Runo Mvumbi, Kangumba, Brother Patrice Ngoy Musoko, Alain Moloto, Lifoko du Ciel, Maninga, Matou Samuel, Blaise Sakila, Feza Shamamba, Marie Misamu, the Cœur La Grâce choir, Moïse Mbiye, Sandra Mbuyi, Mike Kalambay, Deborah Lukalu, Dena Mwana, NK Divine, Faveur Mukoko, David Ize, Daniel Lubams, Jonathan Gambela, Ruth Kimongoli, Isaac Bukasa, Rosny Kayiba, Van Walesa, Eunice Manyanga, Fiston Mbuyi, the Tanga Ni Tanga choir, Batangouna Sébastien, Christian Mahoukou, Moïse Baniakina, Loudi Berthe, Tukindisa Nkembo, Sita Philippe, the Sainte Odile Choir, Zola Choir, and Les Colombes, among others, popularized this form of Congolese Christian music.

== Influence ==
=== Colombian champeta ===
African music has been popular in Colombia since the 1970s and has had a significant impact on the local musical genre known as champeta. In the mid-1970s, a group of sailors introduced records from the Democratic Republic of the Congo and Nigeria to Colombia, including a plate-numbered 45 rpm titled El Mambote by Congo's l'Orchestre Veve, which gained popularity when played by DJ Victor Conde. Record labels proactively dispatched producers to find African records that would resonate with DJs and audiences. The music gained traction, especially in economically underprivileged urban areas, predominantly inhabited by Afro-Colombian communities, where it was incorporated into sound systems at parties across cities such as Cartagena, Barranquilla, and Palenque de San Basilio.

The emergence of champeta involved replicating musical arrangements by Congolese artists like Nicolas Kasanda wa Mikalay, Tabu Ley Rochereau, Mbilia Bel, Syran Mbenza, Lokassa Ya M'Bongo, Pépé Kallé, Rémy Sahlomon, and Kanda Bongo Man. Local artists such as Viviano Torres, Luis Towers, and Charles King, all from Palenque de San Basilio, started composing their own songs and producing unique musical arrangements, while still maintaining the Congolese soukous influence, a derivative of Congolese rumba. They composed and sang in their native language, Palenquero, a creole mix of Spanish and Bantu languages like Kikongo and Lingala.

Champeta's sound is intimately intertwined with Congolese rumba, particularly the soukous style, sharing the same rhythmic foundation. The guitar and the use of the Casio brand synthesizer for sound effects are instrumental in shaping champeta's distinct sound.

During the Super Bowl LIV halftime show on 2 February 2020, at Hard Rock Stadium in Miami Gardens, Florida, Shakira danced to the song "Icha" by Syran Mbenza, accompanied by several dancers. The track is colloquially known as "El Sebastián" in Colombia. Shakira's performance inspired the #ChampetaChallenge on various social media platforms.

=== Ivorian coupé-décalé ===
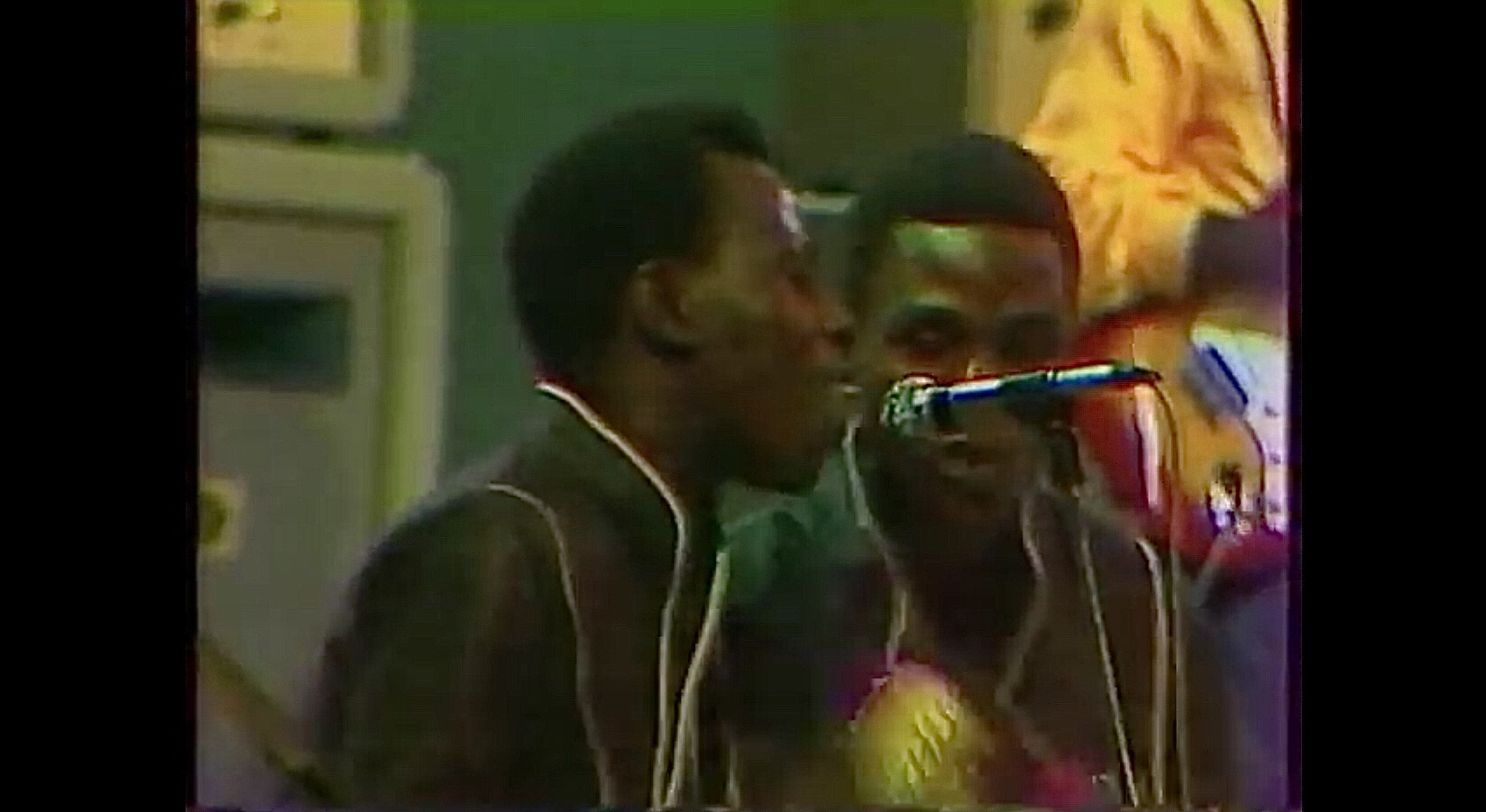
Bébé Atalaku and Nono Monzuluku during their debut televised performance with Zaïko Langa Langa at OZRT's Studio Maman Angebi on 30 October 1982, marking the official introduction of atalaku to Congolese rumba.

The Congolese rumba dance called ndombolo has significantly impacted coupé-décalé dance music with the incorporation of atalaku, a term referencing animators or hype men who enhance the rhythm and interactivity of performances, into its songs. The first Congolese band to employ atalaku was Zaïko Langa Langa, in the 1980s. In one of their early compositions featuring these animators, the repeated chant "Atalaku! Tala! Atalaku mama, Zekete" (Look at me! Look! Look at me, mama! Zekete!) echoed, commanding attention. As coupé-décalé emerged, the Congolese rumba influence remained conspicuous. Notably, with the release of "Sagacité", Douk Saga's debut hit, the explicit imprint of atalaku was apparent. In an RFI interview, DJ Arafat, an Ivorian musician, acknowledged atalaku's influence on his artistic approach. The term has transcended its origins, becoming embedded in the lexicon of Ivory Coast and neighboring countries, though it now signifies "flattery".

=== French hip hop ===
With the emergence of satellite television across Africa in the early 1990s, coupled with the subsequent development and expansion of the internet across the continent in the subsequent decades, French hip hop flourished within the African francophone market. Originating in the United States, the genre rapidly gained popularity among youth of African descent in France and various other European nations. Initially molded by American hip hop, the French variant has since developed a distinct identity and sound, drawing influences from the African musical heritage shared by many French rappers.

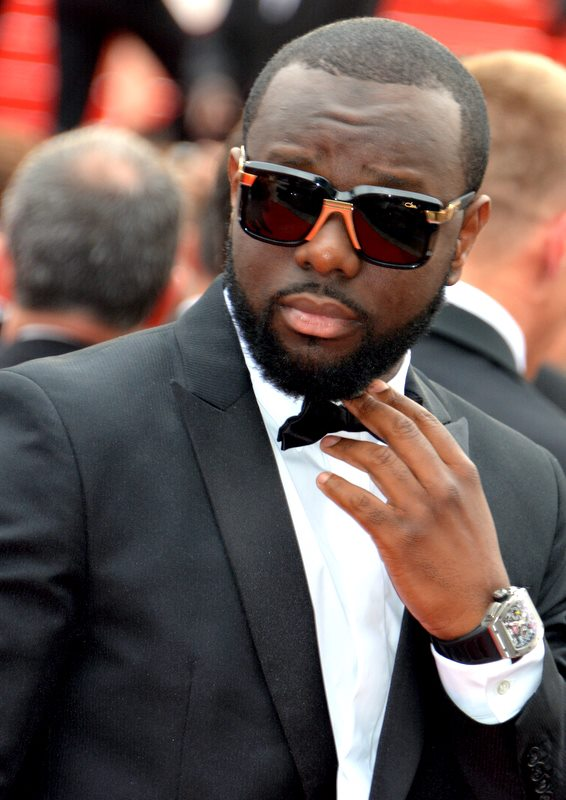
Maître Gims and his younger brother Dadju, two of the most successful Congolese-French musicians, have drawn significant influence from Congolese rumba in their music. On 30 January 2022, they were appointed cultural ambassadors of the Democratic Republic of the Congo by President Félix Tshisekedi.

By the late 1990s, Bisso Na Bisso, a collective of French rappers from the Republic of the Congo, pioneered the infusion of Congolese rumba rhythms into French rap. Their album Racines melds American hip hop, Congolese rumba, soukous, and zouk rhythms, featuring collaborations with African artists like Koffi Olomidé, Papa Wemba, Ismaël Lô, Lokua Kanza, and Manu Dibango, alongside the French-Caribbean zouk group Kassav'. Nearly all their thematic elements revolve around a reconnection with their roots, evident through samples sourced directly from Congolese rumba and soukous. In the early 2000s, the lingua franca of many French rap tracks was Lingala, accompanied by resonant rumba guitar riffs. Mokobé Traoré, a Malian–French rapper, further accentuated this influence on the album Mon Afrique, where he featured artists like Fally Ipupa on the soukous-inspired track "Malembe". The far-reaching impact of "Congolization" transcends hip hop, permeating other genres like French R&B and religious music, all while concurrently gaining traction across Europe and francophone Africa. Prominent artists include Youssoupha, Maître Gims, Dadju, Niska, Singuila, Damso, KeBlack, Naza, Zola, Kalash Criminel, Ninho, Kaysha, Franglish, Gradur, Shay, Bramsito, Baloji, Tiakola, and Ya Levis Dalwear, all descendants of Congolese musical lineage.

=== East African music ===
==== Early transmission and adaptation ====
Following the establishment of Radio Congo Belge, with its extensive broadcasting reach in East, Central, and West Africa, Congolese rumba garnered an extensive audience, evolving into a central focus for East African artists to observe and emulate. Music historian John Storm Roberts, who was working in Nairobi at the time, noted that Congolese music was considered more danceable, somewhat more sophisticated musically, and fashionable because it came from abroad. Among the most notable figures responsible for introducing Congolese rumba to East Africa was Jean-Bosco Mwenda. In the late 1950s, Mwenda and his cousin, Edouard Masengo, relocated to Nairobi, where they introduced a distinctive finger-plucking guitar technique. This innovation profoundly impacted early benga musicians, including groups such as the Ogara Boys. The musical structure they popularized often featured melodic leads, followed by layered vocals, building toward an intense instrumental climax. The rhythmic patterns were hypnotic, often prompting uninhibited dancing among audiences. The emergence of benga as a distinct genre was characterized by the dominance of a sharp lead guitar line, played with increasing urgency. Luo musicians were among the first to adopt this technique, which involved plucking and picking single notes, drawing inspiration from traditional instruments such as the orutu (a one-string fiddle) and the nyatiti (an eight-string lyre). This approach gave rise to a new sound, with the first practitioners of this style later recognized as pioneers of benga music. Artists such as George Ramogi and George Ojijo played a critical role in popularizing the genre by recording with various labels in Nairobi.

During the 1970s, Phares Oluoch Kanindo rose to prominence as one of the key figures in promoting benga music, earning the nickname "the Berry Gordy of benga". Determined to extend the genre's reach past Kenya, he focused on entering the Southern African music scene. Through his Kenyan label, AIT Records, he managed musical groups and distributed benga records to Zimbabwe under the label SP (Super Producer) Kanindo. At the time, Zimbabwe's ongoing liberation struggle had limited local music production, creating a vacuum that Kanindo's records helped fill. The sound of East African benga resonated deeply with Zimbabwean audiences, including freedom fighters, and eventually became associated with the country's independence movement. As Zimbabwean musicians began to adopt and reinterpret benga, a localized variation of the genre took shape, with artists such as Moses Rwizi, the Kanindo Jazz Band, and Obadiah Matulana contributing to the emergence of a Southern African identity within benga. In Zimbabwe, the genre became widely known as kanindo or sungura music. During the 1970s and 1980s, this style gained greater popularity than chimurenga music, a genre founded by Thomas Mapfumo, and contributed to the growing recognition of Kenyan musicians across Southern Africa. This period also coincided with the increasing popularity of Congolese music in Kenya.

Aside from the impact of Jean-Bosco Mwenda, guitarist and singer Ndala Kasheba and his band, Orchestra Fauvette, are widely regarded as the first Congolese rumba musicians to establish themselves in Tanzania. In 1967, the band embarked on a tour from Likasi through Lubumbashi to Kalemie on the shores of Lake Tanganyika. Although the group initially hoped to cross into Tanzania, they instead continued to Bukavu in 1968. Soon afterward, the 1967 mercenary and Katangan gendarme mutiny engulfed the region, displacing about 190,000 residents and forcing Kasheba and his band to flee as refugees to Bujumbura. From there, they traveled to Kigoma in 1968 before moving through Tabora and other towns and eventually arriving in Dar es Salaam in 1969. They were welcomed by the prominent Western Jazz Band, and despite struggling to secure instruments and a reliable income, Orchestra Fauvette found support from the manager of the White House nightclub in Ubongo, where they performed intermittently over the next four years. Their distinctive sound became known among politicians and audiences. After gaining experience performing nightly, the band recorded "Mama Nakupenda" (meaning "Mama I love you") at Radio Tanzania. The recording was enthusiastically received by audiences and even seized the attention of leading Tanzanian bands such as Western Jazz, Morogoro Jazz Band, and Jamhuri Jazz Band. Their success allowed the group to build a devoted fandom while leaving behind the instability in the Congo, and their relocation "foreshadowed the future movement of other Congolese artists over the next decade and a half".

==== Migration and popularization ====
According to ethnomusicology professor Alex Perullo of Bryant University, Mobutu's Zairianization movement precipitated an upsurge in the popularity of Congolese rumba in Tanzania and Kenya, and pirated albums and cassettes from Kinshasa made their way to local markets in East Africa. Writing in Nyota Afrika in April 1970, Ramadhani Athmani remarked that Congolese songs dominated radio broadcasts and nightclub playlists.

Many of the Congolese musicians who settled in Dar es Salaam came from the Katanga and Kivu provinces. Their migration differed from other migration trends of the 1970s, which were largely driven by conflict, forced displacement, or employment in mining, oil, and industrial sectors. Instead, these artists relocated to capitalize on the growing demand for Congolese music. Perullo argues that their extensive social and musical networks allowed them to benefit from these economic and cultural opportunities. Since their musical connections extended across urban centers, they could move between cities with relative ease and establish themselves without having to overcome the barriers typically faced by other migrants. Kampala's music industry remained relatively limited and was also disrupted by the 25 January 1971 coup that brought Idi Amin to power. Although Zambia had recording studios and a record-pressing plant, nationalization policies, the sharp rise in oil prices in 1973, and the collapse of copper prices in 1975 reduced disposable income, which weakened demand for live performances. Many Congolese musicians also reported experiencing "racism, poor living conditions, and other difficulties" in Lusaka, which encouraged them to pursue opportunities in more prosperous music markets. Other destinations, including Malawi, Botswana, Rhodesia, and South Africa, were generally unattractive because of their small music industries or discriminatory racial policies.

By 1975, Nairobi and Dar es Salaam had become the principal destinations for Congolese musicians.Several musicians, including Ikomo "Djo Djo" Ingange, Tshimanga Kalala Assosa, Nsimba Monimambo, and Mose "Fanfan" Se Sengo, headed toward southern or eastern Africa and ultimately reached Dar es Salaam. Congolese rumba groups, such as Orchestra Maquis Original, also established their operational base in Tanzania, alongside Mzee Makassy. Nairobi attracted groups such as Orchestra Super Mazembe, Orchestra Virunga, Orchestra les Mangelepa, which performed at popular clubs such as Starlight Night Club and Garden Square Restaurant and benefited from the country's growing independent recording industry. Proficient in executing Congolese rumba in Kiswahili, these bands exerted influence over groups and artists like Simba Wanyika, Les Wanyika, Fundi Konde, Daudi Kabaka, and Fadhili William. Local Kenyan bands, including TP Luna Kidi and Limpopo International, adopted the Congolese rumba sound while performing mainly in their native Dholuo language with occasional Swahili. Other homegrown artists heavily leaned towards Congolese rumba, singing entirely in Lingala, often overshadowing their local languages.

Perullo pointed out that Dar es Salaam had a stronger live music scene and a more appealing lifestyle for musicians who had grown weary of constantly relocating. Because of this, many artists chose to reside in Dar es Salaam and traveled to Nairobi only to record music. This situation changed in 1977 after relations between Kenya and Tanzania worsened and the two countries closed their shared border. The dispute stemmed from several issues, including disagreements over Idi Amin's rise to power in Uganda, Kenya's dominant role in regional trade, and the inability of the East African Community to establish mutually acceptable trade policies. Tensions escalated after the collapse of East Africa Airways and Kenya's decision to create its own national airline using EAA equipment, which then prompted Tanzania to close the border in February 1977. The closure prevented many musicians from traveling to Nairobi to perform or record. Many Congolese artists consequently remained in Dar es Salaam, while others chose not to return to Congo because, according to Mose Fanfan, they feared being seen as "deserters". The border closure also reduced regional migration and helped build stronger "alliances, relationships, and cultural ties within the city of Dar es Salaam".

=== West Africa ===
Radio broadcasts and touring acts played a central role in spreading Congolese rumba across West Africa. Jean Koh Elong, the Cameroonian guitarist of Caribbean All Stars, recalled regularly listening to Congolese music on the radio during the 1960s. Nigerian bassist Babá Ken Okulolo of the California-based group Kotoja remembered that Congolese music and highlife were the two dominant musical influences throughout West Africa. Sierra Leonean guitarist Dr. Dynamite similarly credited a stay with Docteur Nico during the guitarist's 1969 West African tour as a major influence on his career. Besides radio exposure, several Congolese bands toured extensively in West Africa, particularly in Nigeria. Among the most influential was Ryco Jazz, a Congolese quartet that expanded its membership with local musicians while touring along the West African coast during the 1960s.

== See also ==
- Music of the Democratic Republic of the Congo
- Musicians from the Democratic Republic of the Congo

== Bibliography ==
- Gary Stewart (2000). Rumba on the River: A History of the Popular Music of the Two Congos. Verso. ISBN 1-85984-368-9.
- Wheeler, Jesse Samba (March 2005). "Rumba Lingala as Colonial Resistance". Image & Narrative (10). Archived from the original on 15 January 2016.
