= Chez Faïgnond =

Dance bar and music venue in Poto-Poto, Brazzaville, Congo

- Address: 29 Emile Faïgnond Street, Poto-Poto; Brazzaville; Republic of the Congo
- Owner: Émile Joachim Faïgnond
- Type: Dance bar; nightclub; concert hall; cinema; social club
- Events: Congolese rumba; Polka Piké; biguine; tango; bolero; soukous; ndombolo

Construction
- Opened: 1948

Chez Faïgnond is a historic dance bar and musical venue located at No. 29 Mbakas Street (present-day Emile Faïgnond Street) in the Poto-Poto urban arrondissement of Brazzaville, Republic of the Congo. Established in 1948 by Émile Joachim Faignond, a French-Congolese entrepreneur of mixed heritage, the venue played a pivotal role in the development and popularization of modern Congolese music, particularly during the early rise of Congolese rumba. Widely regarded as the first dedicated Congolese sanctuary of music and dance in Brazzaville and one of the earliest hubs for amplified sound performances in the region, the dance hall also featured a mix of musical styles, including Polka-Piké, popularized by Manuel d'Oliveira, as well as Biguine, Tango, and Bolero. Congolese journalist and writer Tshitenge Lubabu described Chez Faïgnond as the most "cosmopolitan, creative, and fashionable center of attraction" in Brazzaville during its prime.

== History ==
=== Origins and influence ===
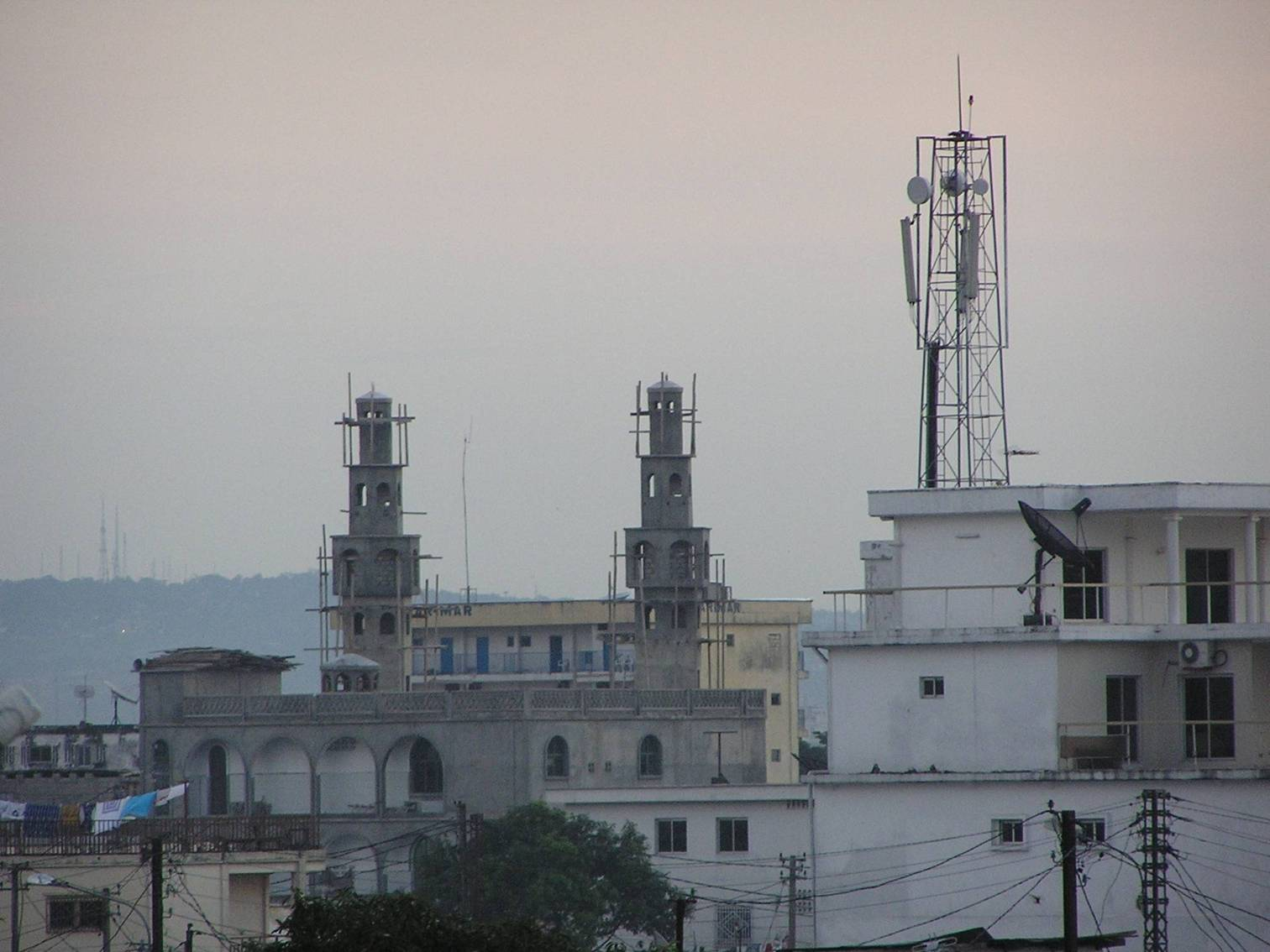
An evening scene in Poto-Poto, where Émile Joachim Faïgnond established Chez Faïgnond in 1948.

Chez Faïgnond was founded in 1948 by Émile Joachim Faïgnond, a half-Congolese, half-French entrepreneur and former soldier who had served in the French army during the First Indochina War. Upon returning to Brazzaville, Faïgnond sought to establish a top-tier entertainment venue that would capture the vibrancy of Caribbean musical cultures he admired, particularly those in Cuba and Puerto Rico, as well as the urban nightlife scene in Kinshasa (then Léopoldville), notably the Siluvangi bar. His vision materialized in the form of Chez Faïgnond, a versatile venue that included a large dance hall, a bar, and even a dedicated cinema. Located in Poto-Poto, one of Brazzaville's oldest arrondissements, Chez Faïgnond quickly emerged as a cultural landmark and one of the first venues in the Congo region to feature amplified sound. It became known for hosting live performances, particularly of Congolese rumba, polka-piké, and other Afro-Caribbean genres such as biguine, tango, and bolero. The bar's layout, a spacious hall with a performance stage and expansive dance floor, was designed to accommodate large gatherings and animated musical events, while its open-air terrace provided a relaxed setting where patrons could enjoy recorded music during weekdays.

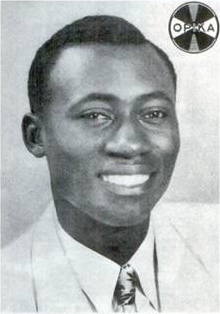
Le Grand Kallé also appeared at Chez Faïgnond with both his African Jazz orchestra and the ensemble from the Opika label under his direction.

The venue's popularity fueled the development of similar establishments across Brazzaville and Kinshasa, including Chez Air France (founded by Samuel Ebongue), Chez Amuzu in Kitega, and OK Bar on Itaga Street. Chez Faïgnond distinguished itself by attracting a highly diverse clientele, becoming a meeting ground for singers, intellectuals, diplomats, government officials, and partygoers. It also drew European patrons from the colonial quarters, making it one of the first truly cosmopolitan nightlife spaces in the region. The venue's embrace of cultural inclusivity, exemplified by the presence of unaccompanied women, known locally as Ndumba, and the mingling of colonial évolués with working-class patrons, earned it a reputation as the most fashionable and socially progressive center of entertainment in Brazzaville. Weekends at Chez Faïgnond featured live performances from some of the most influential orchestras of the time, including Victoria Brazza led by Paul Kamba, Victoria Kin headed by Wendo Kolosoy, the Opika ensemble led by Grand Kallé, and African Jazz. Other acts included Jacques Eboma, François Boyimbo "Gobi", the duo Jhimmy na Mwanga, Tanko et Basile, and Bana Loningisa, managed by impresario Henri Bowane. Musical groups such as Watam and LOPADI (Loningisa de Papadimitriou) also graced its stage.

In addition to its musical programming, Chez Faïgnond organized movie nights and social events that became profoundly woven into Brazzaville's cultural life. Women's and men's associations such as La Violetta, La Mode, La Rosette, Les Existentialistes (Exito Tabou), Le Club des Six, Le Club Bellage, and Cabaret de Grand Jazz played an active role in hosting fashion and dance competitions tied to community celebrations, including birthdays, baptisms, mourning rituals, and holiday festivities.

=== Role in music development ===
A key force in the development of modern Congolese music, Chez Faïgnond was the first dance venue on both sides of the Congo River to adopt amplified sound in 1949, with its inaugural concert featuring the duo Jhimmy na Mwanga. By 1953, it upgraded its audio setup with a high-quality amplifier and four large loudspeakers, making it a top venue for audiences and musicians seeking high-fidelity performance experiences. The bar quickly became a vital launchpad for emerging talent and a conduit for cross-river musical exchange. Patrons frequently crossed from Kinshasa to attend concerts. A defining event came in 1954 when Joseph Kabasele, or "Le Grand Kallé", brought his orchestra, African Jazz, to perform at Chez Faïgnond. During this event, Kabasele discovered several members of the Brazzaville-based Negro Jazz orchestra: Joseph Kaba, Jean Serge Essous, Edouard "Edo" Nganga, Nino Malapet, and Diaboua. This encounter would prove instrumental in shaping the future of Congolese music, as many of these musicians later joined foundational bands in Kinshasa, such as OK Jazz and Rock-a-Mambo.

In early 1955, Jean Serge Essous and his colleagues secured a residency at Chez Faïgnond with their new band, Negro Jazz. The band featured Essous on clarinet, Nino Malapet on saxophone, Joseph Kaba on lead guitar, Edo Ganga and Célestin Kouka as vocalists, and a supporting rhythm section. Negro Jazz found success performing weekly sets at the venue, but their defining moment came when Faïgnond booked African Jazz to perform alongside them. On the night of the joint concert, the venue was filled to capacity, with even European patrons in attendance.

Although African Jazz insisted on performing first, a break from traditional etiquette, Negro Jazz rose to the occasion. After a modest start, they performed a newly composed piece that paid homage to several prominent women's mutual aid associations active at the venue, such as Violette, La Rose, Lolita, and Élégance. These associations organized social gatherings and energized the dance floor during performances. The song's reception was overwhelmingly positive, bringing the crowd to its feet and earning Negro Jazz the respect of their musical peers. According to Essous, even Grand Kallé himself offered congratulations.

Chez Faïgnond was also the birthplace of Les Bantous de la Capitale, one of the most celebrated orchestras in Congo-Brazzaville. Founded on 15 August 1959, one year before the country's independence, the orchestra emerged from the nucleus of Brazzaville musicians who had performed at Chez Faïgnond and other prominent venues.
