= Lucie Eyenga =

Congolese musician (1934–1987)

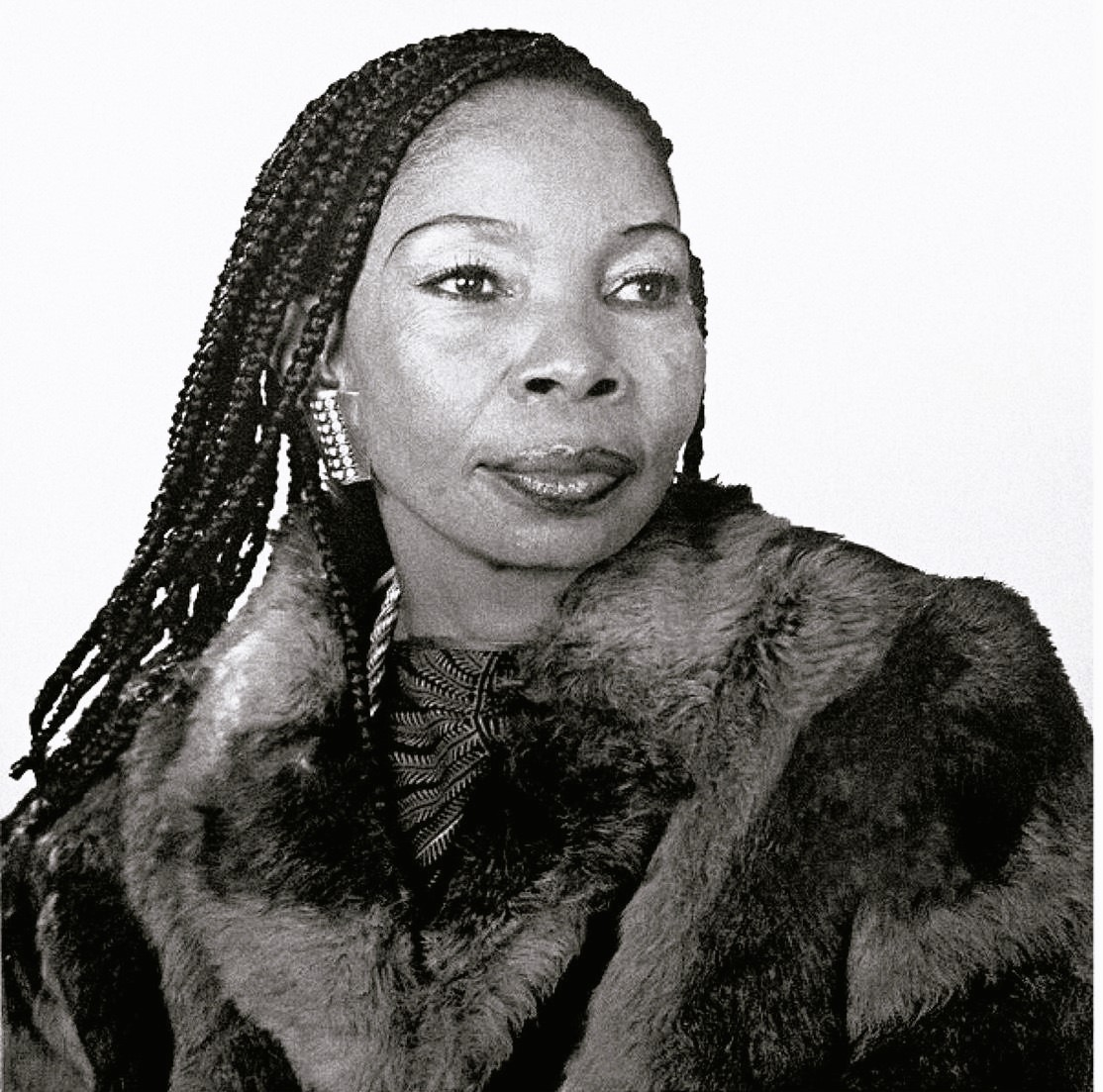
- Lucie in 1984

Background information
- Born: Lucie Eyenga Moseka c. 1934; Coquelathville (now Mbandaka), Belgian Congo (modern-day Democratic Republic of the Congo)
- Origin: Congolese
- Died: 12 December 1987 (aged 53) Kinshasa, Zaire (modern-day Democratic Republic of the Congo)
- Genres: African rumba
- Occupations: Singer; guitarist; songwriter
- Instrument: Vocals
- Years active: 1950s–1987

Lucie Eyenga Moseka (1934 – 12 December 1987) was a Congolese singer-songwriter and one of the earliest female figures in the male-dominated African rumba music. Born in Mbandaka (then Coquilhatville), she was discovered in the 1940s by guitarist Zacharie Elenga and subsequently signed to the Opika label.

She gained further prominence as a member of Le Grand Kallé's African Jazz between 1954 and 1956. After Opika closed, Eyenga joined the Editions Esengo label and achieved notable success with the band Rock-a-Mambo between 1957 and 1958. There, she took part in recording popular songs such as "Brigitte", "Mabe Na Yo Moko", "Dit Moninga", "Nasepeli Mingi", and "Zozo Moke". After a brief hiatus due to the closure of Editions Esengo and the breakup of Rock-a-Mambo, she returned to the music scene in 1962 with Brazzaville's Negro Band, where she recorded the hits "Adoula" and "Georgette". In 1983, she joined African Fiesta Sukisa, led by Nico Kasanda. Eyenga died in Kinshasa on 12 December 1987.

== Early life and career ==
Lucie Eyenga Moseka was born in 1934 in Coquilhatville (now Mbandaka) in what was then the Belgian Congo (now Democratic Republic of the Congo). She grew up in a Mongo family where the rhythms of Zebola and Odemba, along with singing and dancing, were an important part of daily life. While in Léopoldville (now Kinshasa), she was discovered by Zacharie Elenga, a pioneer of Hawaiian guitar in Congolese rumba, who was working with protégé Emmanuel Antoine Tshilumba wa Baloji, better known as Tino Baroza. In 1948, Eyenga gained national attention after recording the song "Bolingo ya la Joie", which was dedicated to the Léopoldville-based women's association La Joie, a devoted fan group much like modern fan clubs. The recording included guitarists Tino Baroza and Charles Mwamba "Dechaud," bassist Albert Tawumani, and saxophonist Isaac Musekiwa. Following "Bolingo ya la Joie" success, Elenga and Tino Baroza helped her join the Opika publishing house, which had opened in 1949 and did not yet have a prominent female lead singer.

Eyenga's breakthrough came in 1954 when she joined Le Grand Kallé's band, African Jazz, where she built her strongest national and international reputation between 1954 and 1956. According to musicologist Clément Ossinondé, Eyenga stood out for her expressive voice and natural singing style. He noted that she delivered every line with the confidence of an experienced performer. Some of her notable work came with Rock-a-Mambo from 1957 to 1959. There, she made an impact through the hit "Brigitte", "Mabe Na Yo Moko", "Dit Moninga", "Nasepeli Mingi", and "Zozo Moke", which established her as one of the most influential female lead singers of her generation one of the few who "didn't get bogged down in the concessions to fashion at the time". After Editions Esengo closed in 1960 and Rock-a-Mambo disbanded the following year, she gradually left the music scene. In 1962, however, she returned in Brazzaville with Negro Band and recorded the popular songs "Adoula" and "Georgette", which brought her back into the spotlight and also helped increase the band's popularity.

In 1973, she was selected to join Bakolo Miziki, an ensemble that brought together leading figures of 1950s Congolese music, for the Anthologie de la Musique Zaïroise Moderne, commissioned by President Mobutu Sese Seko. Under the artistic supervision of Papa Noël Nedule, she revisited her greatest successes in the Opika release. She then stepped away from music again until 1983, when she resurfaced with Nico Kasanda's African Fiesta Sukisa, and in 1984 collaborated with Abeti Masikini. The two recorded two albums at IAD (Industrie Africaine du Disque) in Brazzaville, which revisited Eyenga's classics from her African Jazz and Rock-a-Mambo years (1954–1959).

== Death ==
Eyenga died in Kinshasa on 12 December 1987 at the age of 53.

== Selected discography ==
Year	Records	Label	Details	Ref.
1948	"Bolingo Ya La Joie"	–	Accompanied by guitarists Tino Baroza Charles Mwamba "Dechaud"; Format: Shellac; Language: Lingala; Genre: Congolese rumba	
–	"Mwana Mama" (written by Lucie Eyenga)	Opika	Accompanied by guitarists Dechaud and Imeka; Catalog number 1801; Format: Shellac; Language: Lingala; Genre: Congolese rumba	
–	"Camsoda Youdoue" (written by Lucie Eyenga)	Opika	Accompanied by guitarists Dechaud and Imeka; Catalog number 1801; Format: Shellac; Language: Fox; Genre: Congolese rumba	
–	"Dit Moninga"	Opika	Catalog number OP. 002; Format: Vinyl; Language: Fox; Genre: Congolese rumba	
–	"Mokili Ya Sika" (written by Lucie Eyenga)	Editions Esengo	Accompanied by L'Orchestre Nova Boy's; Catalog number 45-ESN 540 NI; Format: Vinyl; Language: Lingala; Genre: Congolese rumba	
–	"Suzane" (written by Lucie Eyenga)	Editions Esengo	Accompanied by L'Orchestre Nova Boy's; Catalog number 45-ESN 540 NI; Format: Vinyl; Language: Lingala; Genre: Congolese rumba	
–	"Bolingo Na Ngai Gigi" (written by Jean Serge Essous)	Editions Esengo	A collaborative single; Guitar: Nico Kasanda; Vocals: Lucie Eyenga and Le Grand Kallé, accompanied by Rock-a-Mambo; Catalog number ESN. 26; Format: Shellac; Language: Lingala; Genre: Congolese rumba	
–	"Bolingo Etumbu" (written by Jean Serge Essous)	Editions Esengo	A collaborative single; Guitar: Nico Kasanda; Vocals: Lucie Eyenga and Le Grand Kallé, accompanied by Rock-a-Mambo; Catalog number ESN. 26; Format: Shellac; Language: Lingala; Genre: Congolese rumba	
1959	"Brigitte" (written by Lucie Eyenga)	Editions Esengo	With Rock-a-Mambo; Format: Shellac; Language: Lingala; Genre: Congolese rumba	
1959	"Mabe Na Yo Moko" (written by Lucie Eyenga)	Editions Esengo	With Rock-a-Mambo; Format: Shellac; Language: Lingala; Genre: Congolese rumba	
–	"Nkanda Yanini" (written by Lucie Eyenga)	Editions Esengo	Accompanied by Orchestre Congo Negro; Catalog number 64/218B; Format: Vinyl; Language: Lingala; Genre: Congolese rumba	
–	"Naloti Cherie" (written by Lucie Eyenga)	Editions Esengo	Accompanied by Orchestre Congo Negro; Catalog number 64/218B; Format: Vinyl; Language: Lingala; Genre: Congolese rumba	
1976	"Gege Tika Kotungisa"	Editions Sakumuna	With Yenga Moseka Et Son Ensemble; Format: Vinyl; Language: Lingala; Genre: Congolese rumba	
1976	"Gina"	Editions Sakumuna	With Yenga Moseka Et Son Ensemble; Format: Vinyl; Language: Lingala; Genre: Congolese rumba	
