= Le Grand Kallé =

Congolese musician (1930–1983)

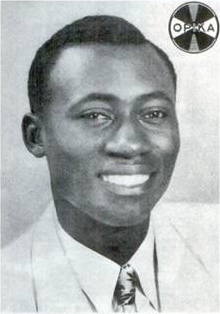
- Promotional photo of Kabasele for Opika in the early 1950s

Background information
- Also known as: Le Grand Kallé; Kabasele Kallé Jeff; Kallé Jeff
- Born: Joseph Athanase Tchamala Kabasele; 16 December 1930; Pala Bala, Belgian Congo
- Origin: Pala Bala
- Died: 11 February 1983 (aged 52) Paris, France
- Genre: African rumba
- Occupations: Singer; songwriter; record executive; composer; bandleader
- Years active: 1953–1983
- Labels: Opika; Editions Esengo; Fonior; Surboum African Jazz; Decca Records; African; Associated Sound Limited; Syllart Productions; AMB; Productions SOUK; SonoDisc; Stern's Music
- Formerly of: Groupe Doula Georges; African Jazz; African Jazz — Nouvelle Formule; African Team

Joseph Athanase Tshamala Kabasele (16 December 1930 – 11 February 1983), popularly known as Le Grand Kallé, was a Congolese singer-songwriter, composer, record executive, and founder of African Jazz. Regarded as the "father of modern Congolese popular music", he shaped the evolution of urban popular music in the Belgian Congo and the post-independence Democratic Republic of the Congo.

Born to a notable Luba family in Pala Bala, Kabasele received more formal education than many of his contemporaries and worked for a time as a typist in various commercial companies in colonial Léopoldville (now Kinshasa). After collaborating with a group of session musicians that included Zacharie Elenga, Georges Dula, Marcellin Laboga, and Albert Yamba Yamba "Kabondo", he founded African Jazz in 1953, the first fully modern, studio-recording Congolese band, and broke new ground by integrating traditional Congolese instruments, such as the Tetela tam-tam, the ngongi drum, and the lokole slit drum, into a cosmopolitan rumba sound characterized by layered guitar interplay and melodic vocal phrasing. His partnerships with early guitarists Tino Baroza, Charles "Dechaud" Mwamba, and Nico Kasanda were central to developing the signature Congolese rumba guitar style, which went on to influence music throughout East, Central, and West Africa for decades.

Kabasele rose to continental prominence in 1960 when, during the Belgo-Congolese Round Table Conference in Brussels, he and African Jazz performed "Indépendance Cha Cha", a Congolese rumba-steeped anthem heralding Congo's impending independence, which rapidly became a pan-African symbol of decolonization, unity, and political consciousness. Beyond his music, Kabasele also shaped the Congolese music industry by becoming in 1960 the first Congolese musician to establish a record label, Surboum African Jazz, which published his own recordings and those of prominent contemporaries. After multiple internal splits within African Jazz, he co-founded the African Team in Paris in 1969. Though he spent stretches of his later life in partial obscurity, he remained highly regarded in the Congolese music scene and was formally recognized in 1980 by the national musicians' union, UMUZA, as grand maître of Zairean music. Kabasele died in Paris on 11 February 1983 and was interred in Gombe Cemetery.

== Early life and education ==
Le Grand Kallé was born Joseph Athanase Tshamala Kabasele on 16 December 1930, in Pala Bala, near Matadi in Bas-Congo, then part of the Belgian Congo (now the Democratic Republic of the Congo). He was the fifth of ten children born to Luba parents André Tshamala and Hortense Malula, the sister of Cardinal Joseph Malula. The name Joseph was chosen to honor his late sister Josephine, and Athanase was added later in keeping with contemporary naming fashions of the time. One week after his birth, his family moved to Léopoldville (now Kinshasa) and settled in the commune of Kinshasa.

Kabasele began his primary education in 1938 at Saint Joseph College (Collège Saint-Joseph) in Gombe, Kinshasa, and continued at Saint Anne middle school. During his studies, he served as a precentor in the Sainte Anne choir and at Saint Peter Church in the early 1940s. In his third year, he was expelled due to a serious disciplinary infraction along with several classmates, including Liwasa Edmond Xavier (Lex) and Labo Gabriel (Laboga). Following his formal education, he worked as a stenographer and typist in various local enterprises.

== Career ==
=== Early 1950–1952: Opika and early work ===
In 1950, the limited religious freedom allowed him to sing regularly in his cité (neighborhood), performing maringa, a precursor to Congolese rumba that originated in the Kingdom of Loango and was widely popular at the time. During this period, he met musicians Georges Dula, Marcellin Laboga, and Albert Yamba Yamba "Kabondo", with whom he founded a combo called Groupe Doula Georges, which yielded breakout compositions based on popular dance rhythms. In 1951, he appeared with them in a filmed advertisement under the ensemble O.T.C. (Orchestre Tendance Congolais) titled Les Voix de la Concorde, which became a milestone in Kabasele's artistic growth and marked the beginning of his move beyond traditional singing and dancing in 1952. Later, he gained access to the Opika studio, run by Belgian Jewish brothers Gabriel and Joseph Moussa Benatar, where he produced his first recorded songs, including "Tika Makele na Ndako", "Bolingo Lokola Like", "Coco wa Ngai", and "Valérie Regina". These tracks featured guitarists Emmanuel Tshilumba wa Baloji ("Tino Baroza") and Charles Mwamba ("Déchaud"), both of whom were disciples of Zacharie Elenga ("Jhimmy"), as well as Belgian saxophonist Fud Candrix, the first European to accompany Congolese melodies. At Opika, he became the label's lead singer and principal tenor, collaborating with Gabriel Labo, Jhimmy, Déchaud, Tino Baroza, Depe, Tauwani, Boyimbo Gobi, and later Nico Kasanda. He gained recognition for his renditions of Jhimmy's songs, including "Ondurowe", "Maboko na likolo", "Baninga", "Baninga"; "Nakombo ya Jhimmy", "Putulu ema".

=== 1953–1962: African Jazz, "Indépendance cha cha", first European tour, and Surboum African Jazz ===
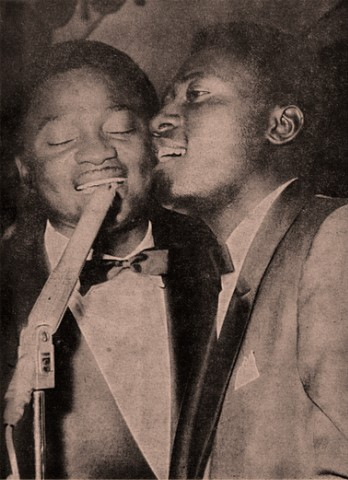
Kabasele (left) and Vicky Longomba (right) performing at the Belgo-Congolese Round Table Conference in February 1960

In 1953, Kabasele founded the African Jazz band, which is often recognized as the first modern musical band in the Belgian Congo. The band integrated traditional instruments, such as the Tetela tam-tam and ngongi drums, with Western-style instrumentation. According to Congolese music journalist Clément Ossinondé, Kabasele was the first Congolese musician to incorporate the traditional Lokole slit drum into modern orchestral arrangements, a practice later complemented by Marie-Isidore's addition of the tumbas. While the band's music was not influenced by jazz, the term "jazz" was chosen because, in Belgian Congo, it did not carry the same meaning as elsewhere. Locally, it was associated with elegance; people would say "he's a jazzeur" to describe someone who livens up a room or starts a party. The musicians played Congolese rumba, but, as Vladimir Cagnolari, editor-in-chief of Pan African Music, observed, they adopted the name jazz for its stylish connotations, as jazz musicians were known for being sharp-dressed and classy. Kabasele wanted a modern-sounding name and anglicized "Africain" to create African Jazz. This inspired other bands to follow suit, including OK Jazz in 1956, Negro-Jazz, Circul Jazz, and elsewhere in Africa, bands like Bembeya Jazz, Chari Jazz, and Mystère Jazz de Tombouctou. Among the band's core members included Albert Tawumani (maracas, backing vocals, double bass), Yamba Yamba Kabondo (acoustic guitar), Lucie Eyenga (vocals), Emmanuel Antoine Tshilumba wa Baloji "Tino Baroza" (electric guitar), André Menga, Isaac Musekiwa (saxophones), Wedi Dominique Kuntima "Willy Mbembe" (trumpet), Antoine Kaya "Depuissant" (tumbas), Albert Dinga (rhythm guitar), and Fud Candrix, with Nico Kasanda joining later as a young guitarist and composer. African Jazz achieved early success with recordings released in November 1953, including "Parafifi", "Nzela mosika", and "African Jazz". Music journalist Audifax Bemba noted that a young "14-year-old pre-teen" Nico Kasanda performed the guitar parts on "Parafifi" and "African Jazz".

In 1955, the Opika label was purchased by Greek entrepreneur Dino Antonopoulos, who went on to establish Les Editions Esengo in January 1957. Around this time, African Jazz found itself competing with the newly formed OK Jazz, which was created in 1956 by former Loningisa label musicians such as Franco Luambo, Philippe Lando Rossignol, Jean Serge Essous, Vicky Longomba, Daniel Loubelo "De La Lune", Ben Saturnin Pandi, Bosuma Dessoin, and Augustin Moniania "Roitelet". OK Jazz quickly gained popularity in Léopoldville for its innovative sound rooted in traditional Congolese music. Meanwhile, African Jazz experienced financial and operational setbacks after Opika went bankrupt in 1957, temporarily ceding prominence to OK Jazz and Rock-a-Mambo. Nonetheless, Kabasele continued at Editions Esengo, where he collaborated with prominent label figures, and African Jazz produced influential works in Congolese music.

During the 1960 Belgo-Congolese Round Table Conference in Brussels, which met to negotiate the Congo's forthcoming independence, Thomas Kanza, then a civil servant with the European Common Market, organized the participation of Congolese musicians at diplomatic and social receptions held for the delegates. Before this, he had contacted his brother Philippe in Léopoldville to help recruit leading performers. In response, Kabasele gathered musicians from African Jazz and OK Jazz, among them Vicky Longomba, Roger Izeidi, Nico Kasanda, Déchaud Mwamba, Pierre "Petit Pierre" Yantula Elengesa, and Antoine Mwango Armando "Brazzos". Some musicians, including Franco Luambo, declined to participate due to leadership preferences, but Kabasele successfully persuaded Vicky Longomba and Brazzos to join the band alongside the African Jazz members. African Jazz reached Brussels on 30 January 1960, becoming the first Congolese musical act and rumba band to perform in the city. Because the conference had already opened on 20 January, they were absent from the initial sessions. Their first official performance took place on 1 February at the Plaza Hotel during a gala known as Le Bal Congo or Le Bal de l'indépendance, organized by the newspaper Congo. The event brought together political figures from Congo and Belgium, African students, diplomats, athletes, and diaspora communities, and was recorded by Flemish public television. After speeches by Philippe and Thomas Kanza, African Jazz performed "Indépendance Cha Cha", a Congolese rumba-infused song celebrating the confirmation of Congo's forthcoming independence on 30 June 1960. Sung in Lingala, Kikongo, and French, the song immediately lifted the crowd's energy and filled the dance floor. Delegates such as Patrice Lumumba and Joseph Kasa-Vubu enjoyed being referenced in the lyrics. The band played into the early morning and gained unprecedented exposure among Belgian listeners. On 20 February, they again performed "Indépendance Cha Cha" at the Plaza Hotel for the conference's closing ceremony. The song became widely recognized as an anthem for African countries achieving independence. Other politically engaged works by Kabasele from this period include "Lumumba", "Congo ya Sika biso", "Bilombe ba gagné" ("the best ones have won"). These recordings featured musicians such as Roger Izeidi (maracas, vocals) and Vicky Longomba (vocals).

That same year, Kabasele became the first Congolese musician to establish his own record label, Surboum African Jazz, with financial backing from Léopoldville-based ECODIS (Édition Congolaise du Disque), the Congo-Decca group (a subsidiary of Decca West Africa Limited), and the Belgian label FONIOR. The label was inaugurated in Brussels, where Kabasele recorded several pieces in collaboration with Cameroonian musician Manu Dibango. Surboum African Jazz allowed Kabasele to produce other bands, including OK Jazz in 1961, which recorded hits such as "Amida Muziki Ya OK", "Nabanzi Zozo", "Maria De Mi Vida", and "Motema Ya Fafa". Revenue from these recordings enabled OK Jazz to acquire new musical equipment. Kabasele also produced Orchestre African Fiesta and several other bands during this period. Meanwhile, also in 1960, members of the Brazzaville band Los Rumbaberos founded the Club Kalé to promote and advance Kabasele's work. Founding members included Sylvain Bemba, Clément Massengo, Firmin Tembe, Gérard Bitsindou, and Amoyen Bibanzoulou. Tabu Ley Rochereau, who had first been introduced to the public on 6 June 1959 during an African Jazz performance at the Vis-à-Vis bar (alongside Joseph "Mujos" Mulamba), only began performing with the band following their return from Brussels.

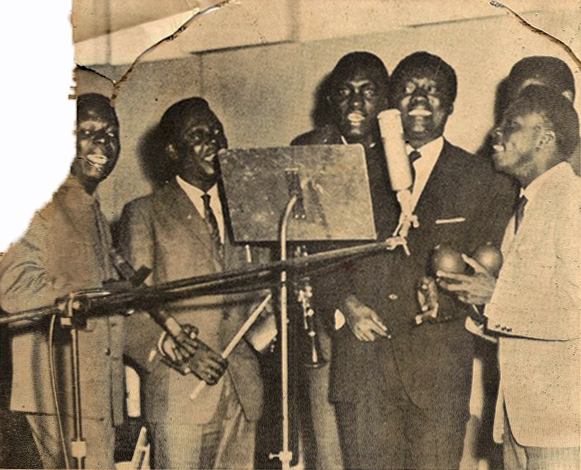
African Jazz in a recording studio in April 1961. Photo from a feature on the band in the newspaper Actualités Africaines. Kabasele is just to the right of the microphone.

In 1961, Kabasele enlisted musicians including Tino Baroza, Dicky Nicolas Tshilumba "Dicky Baroza", Lutula Edouard "Edo Clari", Joseph Mwena, and Manu Dibango for a second Brussels tour and collaborated on tracks such as "Lolo Brigida", "Mayele Mabe", "Africa Bola Ngongi", and "Jamais Kolonga". The latter, meaning "never defeated", was inspired by Jean Lema, a journalist at Radio Congo Belge who provided live commentary during the Congo's independence ceremonies on 30 June 1960 and was a close friend of Kabasele, whose boldness symbolized courage under colonial rule. Meanwhile, in Léopoldville, some African Jazz members broke away to form a rival faction called African Jazz–Nico. After Kabasele's return, the two factions reconciled in June 1961, with Dibango rejoining the band in August. In September, they celebrated with a reunion concert featuring the emblematic song "African Jazz Mokili Mobimba", composed by Dechaud, initially performed by Tabu Ley and later by Kabasele. The song was adapted from Celia Cruz's Cuban hit "Madre Rumba" into a Congolese rumba version. Nico Kasanda concurrently formed a separate African Jazz-style band with Déchaud Mwamba, Tabu Ley, Kaya Depuissant, and Willy Mbembe. Both factions reunited in 1962 for a West African tour, producing hits including "Paracommando", "Sala noki Pascal", "Nkulu Norbert", and "Succès ya African Jazz".

=== 1963–1983: Residency in Paris, African Team, and releases ===
By May 1963, most African Jazz members had left Kabasele to form Orchestre African Fiesta, led by Tabu Ley and Nico Kasanda, which effectively dissolved the original lineup and left Kabasele without his core musicians. In April 1964, with assistance from Foster Manzikala, Kabasele rebuilt the band by recruiting mainly from Jeannot Bombenga's Vox Africa, bringing in Bombenga along with Casino Mutshipule, André Kambeta "Damoiseau", Papa Noël Nedule, Matthieu Kuka, Nsita Rolly, Alex Mayukuta, Joseph Munange "Maproco", and Michel Yuma Kasongo "Michel Sax", as well as guitarist Jacques Mambau "Jacky" from Les Bantous de la Capitale. Although he revived the African Jazz name, the band operated as an entirely new formation and was often referred to as "African Jazz — Nouvelle Formule" ("new formula"). Over the next seven years, Kabasele and African Jazz continued to remain influential in the Congolese music scene.

In 1966, a chance encounter in Paris brought together several former African Jazz musicians, including Joseph Mulamba "Mujos" Kwamy Munsi, Casimir Mbilia ("Casino"), Bombenga, Jean Serge Essous, Tino Baroza, and others, for a recording released under the African Jazz banner. However, these reunions ultimately strained relations between Bombenga and Kabasele. By June 1967, a disagreement led Bombenga to break away to revive Vox Africa, which then ended Kabasele's attempts to fully reestablish African Jazz. That same year, Congo hosted the Organisation of African Unity (OAU) summit at the Cité de l'OUA, and Kabasele composed "Carrefour Addis Abeba", distributing a copy to every delegate who visited Kinshasa.

Following the 1961 assassination of Patrice Lumumba, who had appointed him Secretary of Information, Kabasele went into exile in Paris in 1963. In 1969, at the initiative of Kabasele and Manu Dibango, a gathering of Essous, Edo Clari, Mujos, and the Cuban musician Gonzalo Fernandez led to the creation of the short-lived band African Team (also known as L'African Team de Paris). The band represented what has been described as Kabasele's "last musical refuge". African Team recorded the album Kallé et L'African Team Vol. 1, which fused Congolese rumba with pachanga, mambo, charanga, and merengue. Kabasele co-wrote tracks with Mujos ("Ma Préférée Irène", "Tozongela Dilanda", "Barubatsie", "Bebe Ilenda"), Edouard Lutula ("Cococo... Qui Est La", "Mokili Ngonga"), Gonzalo Fernandez ("Minueyo Boongalo"), Mujos ("Essous Spiritou"), Dede ("Mokili Ngonga"), and collaborated with Tino Baroza, Tino Baroza, and Manu Dibango on "Nzela Mosika". Dibango also contributed the track "Kara-Kara". Gonzalo's flute gives the music a charanga touch, while Dibango switches between saxophone and organ on two lively boogaloo numbers.

In 1971, Kabasele released "Safari Muzuri", a travel narrative song describing a train journey along the KDL line (Kalemie-Dilolo-Lubumbashi). Unlike typical travel songs that focused on love, "Safari Muzuri" served as a moral exhortation for KDL train passengers. Kabasele remained in Paris until 1973, after which he returned to Kinshasa and occasionally collaborated with bands such as Orchestre G.O. Malebo, TPOK Jazz, and Baninga de Madiata. Despite several attempts to revive African Jazz, Kabasele was unable to reestablish its former prominence.

== Death ==
In 1980, Kabasele became seriously ill and "narrowly escaped death". Although his condition drew limited attention domestically, President Mobutu Sese Seko intervened by providing a donation of 50,000 French francs. He was transferred to a hospital in Paris, where he underwent treatment and gradually recovered over the following two years. From 1–5 February 1983, Kinshasa hosted the first International Symposium of African Music (Symposium international de musique africaine; SIMAF), during which veteran Congolese musicians were invited to perform at the studios of Radio Télévision nationale congolaise (RTNC), now known as Studio Mama Angebi, including Nico Kasanda and Lucie Eyenga. One week later, on 11 February 1983, Kabasele died in Kinshasa and was later laid to rest on 14 February 1983 at the Gombe cemetery. Musicians from both sides of the Congo paid tribute to his memory.

== Personal life ==
=== Family ===
Joseph Kabasele was the father of seven children, three sons and four daughters, of whom two daughters and one son passed away before him. He was also a grandfather to 17 grandchildren and eight great-grandchildren. Known for keeping his family life private, he seldom involved his family in his career, though he occasionally referenced them in his songs. In an interview documented by E-Journal Kinshasa, his son Nono Kabasele described him as a devoted father who "truly spoiled" his children and expressed genuine love and care for them. With his wife Catherine Kallé Katho, whom he married in 1963, he had four children: the eldest son, a pair of twins (a boy and a girl), and one other child. Another daughter named Tyty, like her twin sister, was born to Mama Kapinga, who was the mother of singer Gina Efonge's wife. Kabasele also expressed his affection for Catherine through his music and dedicated the song "Kallé Kato" to her.

=== Personality ===
Kabasele was described by Congolese scholar Augustin Tshonga Onyumbe as a "tenacious and stubborn" who recognized early that his destiny lay in his voice and in music. His elder sister recalled that his family initially criticized his decision to pursue music, yet Kabasele persisted despite repeated reproaches and, through perseverance, eventually made a name for himself. Though he appeared reserved because of a slight stammer, he was, as Tshonga noted, "jovial, lively, and humorous", and the stammer disappeared entirely when he sang.

According to Nico Kasanda, some people perceived Kabasele as arrogant, but he believed this was simply a sense of pride. In an era when musicianship was often dismissed as a profession for social outcasts, Kabasele's posture, presence, and intellectual demeanor could easily be misinterpreted. His overriding concern was to maintain dignity in all circumstances, through his appearance, speech, and conduct, and he demanded the same standards from his musicians, on stage and in private life. While he had strengths and weaknesses, he was especially known for his sociability and generosity.

== Legacy ==
Kabasele is regarded as one of the foundational figures in modern Congolese music and is often celebrated as the "father of Congolese rumba". Through his leadership of African Jazz, he helped define the stylistic characteristics of a genre that would dominate Central and West Africa for decades. His distinctively vocal delivery established a new artistic standard for Congolese singers, to such a degree that contemporaries and successors were often said to be disciples of the so-called "Kabasele school". He introduced lyricism and romantic themes into Congolese rumba while distinguishing it from Cuban music through the use of traditional instruments such as the Tetela tam-tam, the Luba one-bar xylophone (didimbadimba), and the ngongi drum. Early recordings like "Parafifi" and "Kale Kato", were among the first to incorporated saxophones into Congolese rumba arrangements, and through his collaborations with guitarists Nico Kasanda and Charles "Dechaud" Mwamba, Kabasele helped forge the multi-layered, guitar-centric sound that would become a signature of Congolese rumba.

In 1960, his song "Indépendance Cha Cha", composed to celebrate the Congo's looming independence and to salute its national leaders, swiftly became a pan‑African anthem of decolonization embraced across Africa. Other works, including "Bilombe ba Gagne" and "Toyokana Tolimbisana na Congo", addressed themes of colonial oppression, national pride, and unity. Beyond his performances, Kabasele played a key role in institutionalizing Congolese music by founding the African Jazz and Surboum African Jazz labels in 1960, becoming one of the first Congolese publishers of African music, with these ventures promoting his own band as well as distributing recordings of rival bands like TPOK Jazz. Although internal disputes led to the dissolution of the original African Jazz in 1963, the band's model of professional organization and innovation served as the prototype for subsequent Congolese bands. In recognition of his impact, Kabasele was named grand maître of Zairean music by the national musicians' union UMUZA in 1980. Kinshasa's Avenue Flambeau was renamed Avenue Kabasele Tshamala in Barumbu, and in Brazzaville, a bust honoring him stands near Marien Ngouabi's tomb.

== Discography ==
=== Albums, including compilations ===
- Merveilles Du Passé – Hommage Au Grand Kalle Vol. 2 (1984, African)
- Essous / Kwamy / Mujos / Edo / Casino (1993, Sonodisc)
- 1966 – 1967 (1993, Grand Kalle/Syllart)
- Grand Kallé et African Team, Vol. 1 (1993, Grand Kalle/Syllart)
- Grand Kalle et l'African Jazz 1961–1962 (Merveilles du passé, vol. 2) (1993, Sonodisc)
- Grand Kalle & L'African Team (1997, Sonodisc)
- Le Grand Kalle (2013, Le Monde des Artistes)
- Jolie Nana (2013, Marylebone Records)
- Joseph Kabasele, Le Grand Kalle: His Life, His Music (2013, Sterns Africa)
- The History Of Le Grand Kallé, Vol. 1 (2013, Diamond Days)
- The History Of Le Grand Kallé, Vol. 2 (2013, Diamond Days)
- The History Of Le Grand Kallé, Vol. 3 (2013, Diamond Days)
- The History Of Le Grand Kallé, Vol. 4 (2013, Diamond Days)
- The History Of Le Grand Kallé, Vol. 5 (2013, Diamond Days)
- Butsana Mama: Le Grand Kallé & His Songs, Vol. 1 (2013, Supreme Media)
- Butsana Mama: Le Grand Kallé & His Songs, Vol. 2 (2013, Supreme Media)
- Butsana Mama: Le Grand Kallé & His Songs, Vol. 3 (2013, Supreme Media)
- Butsana Mama: Le Grand Kallé & His Songs, Vol. 4 (2013, Supreme Media)
- Butsana Mama: Le Grand Kallé & His Songs, Vol. 5 (2013, Supreme Media)

=== Notable singles ===
- "Parafifi" (1953, Opika; reissued ~1961, Surboum African Jazz)

=== Contributing artist ===
- The Rough Guide to Congo Gold (2008, World Music Network)
- Authenticité Vol. 2 (2014, Eben Entertainment)

=== As bandleader of African Jazz ===
(see that page)
