= Willy Mbembe =

Congolese trumpeter (1931–1972)

- Born: Dominique Kutima Wedi; 31 July 1931; Léopoldville (now Kinshasa)
- Died: 1972 (aged 40–41) Kinshasa
- Genre: Congolese rumba
- Occupations: Trumpeter; composer; orchestra organizer
- Instrument: Trumpet
- Years active: 1950s–1972
- Formerly of: African Jazz; African Fiesta; African Fiesta National; Orchestre Afrisa International

Dominique Kutima Wedi (31 July 1931 – 1972), known professionally as Willy Mbembe, was a Congolese trumpeter, composer and orchestra organizer. Born in Léopoldville (now Kinshasa), he became a notable trumpet player in the emerging Congolese popular music scene. He performed with African Jazz, led by Le Grand Kallé, and later with African Fiesta, African Fiesta National, and Orchestre Afrisa International.

== Life and career ==
=== 1931–early 1950s: Early life and career beginnings ===
Willy Mbembe was born Dominique Kutima Wedi in Léopoldville (now Kinshasa) on 31 July 1931 into a Protestant family. He received his early education from missionaries of the Baptist Missionary Society (BMS). Mbembe learned to play the trumpet while still a student, and according to music journalist Clément Ossinondé, had become proficient before completing his primary education. He played with Antoine Kasongo Kitenge's band while working during the day. He later studied for two years at the École Moyenne de Sona-Pangu in Bas-Congo (now Kongo Central) before returning to Léopoldville, where he worked for a publishing company.

In 1950, he left his job to join Kasongo's orchestra on a tour of the Upper Congo (Haut-Congo), visiting Coquilhatville (now Mbandaka) and Stanleyville (now Kisangani). After returning to Léopoldville, he continued working while pursuing music, including activities associated with the Ngoma record label.

=== 1950s–1962: African Jazz and split ===
Mbembe joined African Jazz, founded by Joseph Kabasele, popularly known as Le Grand Kallé. Retrospective accounts date his joining of the orchestra to 1955, while personnel documentation identifies him as a trumpet player on recordings from the late 1950s through the early 1960s.

African Jazz was one of the leading orchestras of modern Congolese music. Its personnel included leading musicians such as Nico Kasanda, Tabu Ley Rochereau, Charles "Déchaud" Mwamba, Roger Izeidi, Isaac Musekiwa and others, with Mbembe serving as one of the band's prominent horn players alongside André Menga.

In 1961, African Jazz returned to Brussels for a second tour, joined by Tino Baroza, Dicky Nicolas Tshilumba "Dicky Baroza", Edouard Lutula "Edo Clari", Joseph Mwena, and Manu Dibango. While in Brussels, disputes within African Jazz in Léopoldville prompted several members to form the splinter group African Jazz–Nico. After Le Grand Kallé's return to Léopoldville, the factions reconciled in June 1961, and in September, the reunited band held a concert featuring Déchaud's composition "African Jazz Mokili Mobimba" ("African Jazz all over the world"). Nico also organized an ensemble that included Mbembe, Déchaud, Tabu Ley, and Kaya Depuissant. The two groups reunited in 1962. Retrospective accounts identify Mbembe's trumpet playing with songs including "Bonbon sucré", "Djumanando" and "Permission".

=== 1963–1972: African Fiesta, later career, and death ===
In 1963, many of African Jazz's leading musicians departed to establish African Fiesta, formed by Tabu Ley and Nico. Mbembe was one of the band's founding members and performed with the band from 1963 to 1965. He played trumpet on several recordings from this period, including "Rendez-vous chez là-bas", "Na Cubana na vis-à-vis" and "Tremento Punto". In 1966, following another split within African Fiesta, Mbembe joined Tabu Ley's African Fiesta National. He also performed on the boleros "Joujou Zena" and on the introductory section of "Maria Maria".

During the late 1960s and early 1970s, Mbembe performed alongside Congolese brass musicians including Alphonse Bido Batilangandi ("Biolo") and Jean-Pierre Nzenze ("Jean Trompette"). Mbembe played on recordings including "Congolia", "Riviera", "Moussa" and "Tika Na Meka". In 1970, Tabu Ley formed Orchestre Afrisa International, with Mbembe remaining with the ensemble. That year, they also performed at the Olympia Hall in Paris.

Mbembe died in 1972 in a traffic accident in Kinshasa. The accident occurred at the intersection of Kabinda and Bokasa avenues while he was returning from a concert at dusk.

== Legal issues ==
Mbembe was imprisoned from 1957 to 1959 in connection with an alleged sexual assault involving a 17-year-old Belgian woman. E-Journal Kinshasa described the imprisonment as arbitrary and compared Mbembe's imprisonment with that of Franco Luambo, who was imprisoned for two months in 1958 for a traffic violation.
