= Le Grand Kallé et l'African Jazz =

Congolese rumba band

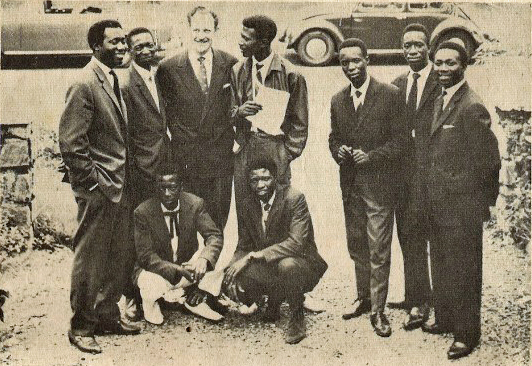
- African Jazz in 1961, featuring prominent members such as Le Grand Kallé, Charles "Déchaud" Mwamba, Docteur Nico, Tabu Ley Rochereau, and Roger Izeidi

Background information
- Also known as: African Jazz
- Origin: Léopoldville, Belgian Congo
- Genres: Congolese rumba
- Years active: 1953–1963; 1966–1968
- Labels: Opika; Editions Esengo; Fonior; Surboum African Jazz; Decca Records; African; Associated Sound Limited; Syllart Productions; AMB; Productions SOUK; SonoDisc; Stern's Music
- Past members: (See Personal section)

Le Grand Kallé et l'African Jazz, often simply referred to as African Jazz, was one of the most influential Congolese rumba bands of the twentieth century. Founded in 1953 in Léopoldville (now Kinshasa) by Joseph Athanase Tshamala Kabasele, widely known as Le Grand Kallé, the band played a pivotal part in shaping modern Congolese popular music during the late colonial era and the early years following independence. The band's style fused Central African traditional instruments, including the Tetela tam-tam, the ngongi drum, and the lokole, with Western guitars, brass, and percussion, creating a cosmopolitan form of Congolese rumba that came to epitomize urban life in the 1950s and 1960s. The term jazz in their name, chosen not for its American musical meaning but for its association with elegance and modernity in the Belgian Congo, went on to influence the nomenclature of several African bands, including OK Jazz, Negro-Jazz, Circul Jazz, and, across the continent, bands such as Bembeya Jazz, Chari Jazz, and Mystère Jazz de Tombouctou.

With Kabasele as the band's frontman, African Jazz became a leading presence within Léopoldville's competitive recording industry, first through their association with Opika and later with Éditions Esengo. They achieved early commercial success with hits "Parafifi", "Nzela mosika", and "African Jazz", which also showcased the growing talent of guitarist Nico Kasanda. Over time, the band's core membership expanded to include Charles "Déchaud" Mwamba, Vicky Longomba, Roger Izeidi, Lucie Eyenga, Isaac Musekiwa, Tino Baroza, Albert Tawumani, André Menga, Willy Mbembe, Antoine Kaya "Depuissant", Tabu Ley Rochereau, and Belgian jazz musician Fud Candrix. They reached international fame during the Belgo-Congolese Round Table Conference in Brussels in 1960, where Kabasele was commissioned to form a special delegation orchestra. Their performance of "Indépendance Cha Cha", recorded in Brussels soon afterward, became a pan-African independence anthem. The band continued touring across Belgium, the Netherlands, and France between 1960 and 1961, drawing significant attention from European press outlets and Congolese diaspora audiences.

African Jazz experienced several defections beginning in 1963, culminating in the departure of major figures like Tabu Ley Rochereau and Nico Kasanda to form African Fiesta, which led to the dissolution of the original lineup. Kabasele mounted a brief revival of the band under the banner African Jazz — Nouvelle Formule between 1966 and 1968, drawing new members largely from Vox Africa, and later collaborated with former colleagues and international artists during his years in Paris. Although these efforts sustained his influence, African Jazz never fully regained the cohesion or dominance of its pre-1963 era.

== History ==
=== 1953–1959: Formation and early work ===
African Jazz was founded in 1953 by Joseph Kabasele. The band integrated traditional Congolese instruments, such as the Tetela tam-tam and the ngongi drum, with Western-style instrumentation. According to Congolese music journalist Clément Ossinondé, Kabasele was the first Congolese musician to incorporate the traditional lokole slit drum into Congolese rumba orchestral arrangements, a development that was later complemented by Marie-Isidore's introduction of the tumbas.

Although the band did not play jazz music, the term jazz was adopted because, in the Belgian Congo, it carried different connotations than in Europe or the United States. It was locally linked to ideas of elegance and liveliness rather than a specific musical style. As music journalist Vladimir Cagnolari points out, calling someone a "jazzeur" meant that the person could bring excitement to social events. He further explains that the band kept playing rumba but selected the name "jazz" because it reflected style, modern life, and the image of sharply dressed performers. Kabasele also wanted a modern-sounding name, so he anglicized Africain to form African Jazz. This choice later influenced the names of other bands, including OK Jazz, Negro-Jazz, Circul Jazz, as well as bands in other African countries like Bembeya Jazz, Chari Jazz, and Mystère Jazz de Tombouctou.

African Jazz's principal members included Albert Tawumani (maracas, backing vocals, double bass), Yamba Yamba Kabondo (acoustic guitar), Lucie Eyenga (vocals), Emmanuel Antoine Tshilumba wa Baloji "Tino Baroza" (electric guitar), André Menga, Isaac Musekiwa (saxophones), Willy Mbembe (trumpet), Antoine Kaya "Depuissant" (tumbas), Albert Dinga (rhythm guitar), and Fud Candrix. Nico Kasanda later joined as a young guitarist and composer. They achieved early commercial success with recordings released in November 1953, including "Parafifi", "Nzela mosika", and "African Jazz". Music journalist Audifax Bemba reported that the guitar parts on "Parafifi" and "African Jazz" were performed by Nico Kasanda.

Opika was acquired in 1955 by Greek businessman Dino Antonopoulos, who later launched Les Editions Esengo in January 1957. During this period, African Jazz encountered growing rivalry from OK Jazz, a band newly established in 1956 and made up of former Loningisa label musicians, including Franco Luambo, Philippe Lando Rossignol, Jean Serge Essous, Vicky Longomba, Daniel Loubelo "De La Lune", Ben Saturnin Pandi, Nicolas Bosuma Bakili "Dessoin", and Augustin Moniania "Roitelet". OK Jazz rapidly attracted a following in Léopoldville with its sound built on traditional Congolese musical foundations. Anthropologist Bob W. White has compared the "clean, cosmopolitan, modernist sound" of African Jazz by the mid-1960s with the "more rootsy traditionalist sound" of OK Jazz to illustrate the argument. At the same time, African Jazz endured financial and management challenges triggered by Opika's collapse in 1957, which temporarily yielded the spotlight to OK Jazz and Rock-a-Mambo. Despite this, African Jazz remained active at Editions Esengo and worked closely with prominent figures there to produce records.

=== 1960: First European tour ===
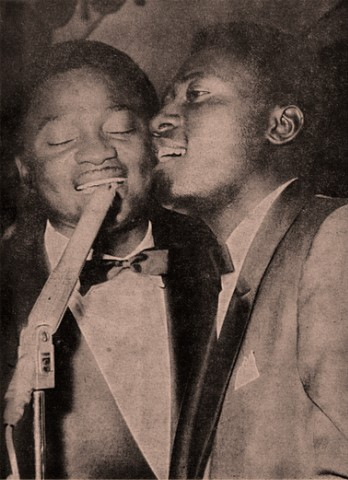
Kabasele (left) and Vicky Longomba (right) performing at the Belgo-Congolese Round Table Conference in February 1960

During the Belgo-Congolese Round Table Conference in Brussels, Kabasele was invited by Thomas Kanza, a civil servant at the European Common Market (ECM), to assemble a Congolese rumba ensemble to entertain the delegation. Prior to this, Thomas Kanza had contacted his brother Philippe in Léopoldville to help recruit leading Congolese musicians. In response, Kabasele brought together performers from African Jazz and OK Jazz, including Vicky Longomba, Roger Izeidi, brothers Nico Kasanda and Déchaud Mwamba, Pierre "Petit Pierre" Yantula Elengesa, and Antoine Mwango Armando "Brazzos". Several musicians, including Franco Luambo, declined due to leadership preferences, but Kabasele secured the participation of Longomba and Brazzos alongside members of African Jazz. As most musicians were affiliated with African Jazz and Kabasele remained bandleader and lead vocalist, the group was presented as a special formation of African Jazz. This ensemble gave a farewell concert on 28 January 1960 at the Lisala Bar in Léopoldville before departing for Brussels. Philippe Kanza accompanied them to Maya-Maya Airport in Brazzaville, and on 29 January they flew to Brussels via Paris. In interviews with Actualités africaines, Kabasele explained that the trip was financed and organized by the Agence africaine de publicité, a marketing and public relations agency that managed the band's contracts and secured sponsorship.

African Jazz arrived in Brussels on 30 January, becoming the first Congolese musical act and rumba band to tour the city. Because the Round Table Conference had begun on 20 January, the band did not participate in the opening events. Rather than staying at the Hotel Le Plaza with the Congolese delegation, they lodged in a family guesthouse on 52 Rue de l'Association. The band's first official performance took place on 1 February at the Hotel Le Plaza during a gala referred to as "Le Bal Congo" or "Le Bal de l'indépendance", which was organized by the newspaper Congo. Attendees included Congolese and Belgian political figures, African students, diplomats, athletes, and members of the African diaspora. The Flemish public television service filmed the event. After opening speeches by Philippe and Thomas Kanza, African Jazz performed "Indépendance Cha Cha", prompting immediate enthusiasm and filling the dance floor. Delegates, including Patrice Lumumba and Joseph Kasavubu, welcomed their inclusion in the song's lyrics. The band members were astonished that Belgian television and numerous European journalists were eager to record and interview them. They played until dawn and gained unprecedented visibility among Belgian audiences. African Jazz remained in Europe for three months, performing regularly for Congolese delegates at the Hotel Le Plaza and giving public concerts at venues such as Le Dauphin Royal in Schaerbeek, where they developed a strong fandom.

Their growing popularity attracted attention from local institutions, including the department store Les Grands Magasins de La Bourse, which engaged the band to perform daily for customers. The band also appeared at the dance hall Au Midi dansant and participated in the festival La Nuit de Saint Vincent alongside leading Belgian artists, including Annie Cordy. On 27 February, the band performed at the Casino of Chaudfontaine near Liège for the annual "Grand Bal du Standard", hosted by the Royal Standard de Liège football club. Although they were initially billed as a secondary supporting act for the fellow mixed-race Congolese-Belgian musician Vicky Down, African Jazz generated considerable enthusiasm among attendees and contributed to record ticket sales. The performance opened with Nico Kasanda easing the crowd in through improvised guitar passages. Kabasele then took over, firing up a lively cha-cha-cha dance and extemporaneous vocals. Understanding the importance of winning the crowd's favor, he began by referencing the football team's recent triumphs and calling out the names of its players. From his place backstage, Vicky Down later told a journalist that he had never experienced such an electric atmosphere at any performance. The band continued to perform widely in Belgium, including at Les Anges Noirs, the Eden dance hall, and the Château de Beaulieu in Mons, and gave a concert in Hilversum, the Netherlands. They also appeared in Paris at the invitation of the student association Fondation d'Outre-Mer. Throughout the tour, the band attracted a growing following, and its members became prominent public figures in the Congolese diaspora community.

During their stay in Brussels, Brazzos switched from rhythm guitar to double bass to accommodate the band's instrumentation, inspired by the synergy between Nico Kasanda and Déchaud. The band also made promotional appearances, including at the Martini Club and the Soubry pasta factory. Although the tour felt lengthy to the musicians, it allowed limited time to respond to invitations from Germany, Italy, and the Soviet Union. African Jazz concluded its European engagements with two gala performances at the Plaza Hotel: one on 22 April marking the end of the political negotiations, and another on 27 April, announced as the "Congo Newspaper Ball" and the "African Jazz Farewell Ball". Shortly before returning to Africa, Kabasele founded his own record label, Surboum African Jazz, with financial support from ECODIS (Édition Congolaise du Disque), the Congo-Decca group (a subsidiary of Decca West Africa Limited), and the Belgian company FONIOR. The label was officially inaugurated in Brussels, where Kabasele re-recorded and produced several works in collaboration with Cameroonian musician Manu Dibango, such as "Indépendance Cha Cha" and "Table Ronde". "Indépendance Cha Cha" quickly became celebrated as an anthem for African nations gaining independence. Other politically committed songs he produced at this time include "Lumumba", "Congo ya Sika biso", and "Bilombe ba gagné" ("the best ones have won"), featuring contributions from Roger Izeidi (maracas, vocals) and Longomba (vocals). Copies of the recordings were shipped to Léopoldville for distribution in record stores and for broadcast on Radio Congo Belge, where announcer Jean Lema ensured they were aired before each program. Tabu Ley Rochereau, who had first been introduced to the public on 6 June 1959 during an African Jazz performance at the Vis-à-Vis bar (alongside Joseph "Mujos" Mulamba), only began performing with the band following their return from Brussels.

=== 1961–1965: from second Brussels tour to band's reorganization ===
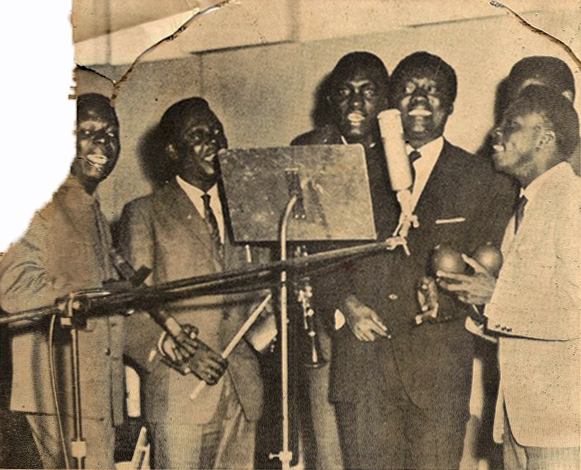
African Jazz in a recording studio in April 1961. Photo from a feature on the band in the newspaper Actualités Africaines.

In 1961, a second tour to Brussels was organized, featuring musicians such as Tino Baroza, Dicky Nicolas Tshilumba "Dicky Baroza", Edouard Lutula "Edo Clari", Joseph Mwena, and Dibango. During this trip, the band recorded several titles, including "Lolo Brigida", "Mayele Mabe", "Africa Bola Ngongi", and "Jamais Kolonga". The latter, which translates to "never defeated", was inspired by Jean Lema, a journalist for Radio Congo Belge who delivered the live broadcast of the Congo's independence ceremonies on 30 June 1960 and was a close associate of Kabasele. Lema's outspoken demeanor came to symbolize moral courage during the final years of colonial rule. Meanwhile, internal tensions in Léopoldville led several African Jazz members to break away and form a splinter band known as African Jazz–Nico. After Kabasele's return, the two factions reconciled in June 1961, and Dibango rejoined the orchestra in August. In September, the reunited band marked the occasion with a concert that introduced Déchaud's emblematic composition "African Jazz Mokili Mobimba" (meaning "African Jazz all over the world"), first performed by Tabu Ley before being reinterpreted by Kabasele. During the same period, Nico Kasanda organized a parallel African Jazz–influenced formation with Déchaud, Tabu Ley, Kaya Depuissant, and Willy Mbembe. Both factions ultimately regrouped in 1962 for a West African tour, which produced several notable successes, including "Paracommando", "Sala noki Pascal", "Nkulu Norbert", and "Succès ya African Jazz".

By May 1963, most of African Jazz's leading musicians had left Kabasele to join Orchestre African Fiesta, a group founded in 1962 under the joint leadership of Tabu Ley and Nico Kasanda while they were still members of African Jazz. Their departure effectively dismantled the original African Jazz lineup and left Kabasele without his core collaborators. In April 1964, with the assistance of Foster Manzikala, Kabasele reorganized the band by recruiting primarily from Jeannot Bombenga's Vox Africa. The new formation included Bombenga himself, Casino Mutshipule, André Kambeta "Damoiseau", Papa Noël Nedule, Matthieu Kuka, Nsita Rolly, Alex Mayukuta, Joseph Munange "Maproco", and Michel Yuma Kasongo "Michel Sax", in addition to guitarist Jacques Mambau "Jacky" from Les Bantous de la Capitale. Although the revived band operated under the African Jazz name, it functioned as an entirely new configuration and was widely referred to as African Jazz — Nouvelle Formule. The band continued to maintain a degree of influence within the Congolese music over the following seven years.

=== 1966–1983: Paris sessions, revival efforts, exile, and the creation of African Team ===
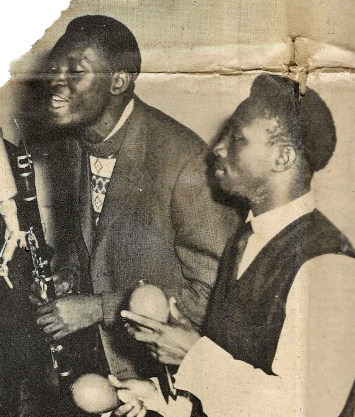
Edouard Lutula and Roger Izeidi recording for the band

In 1966, an unplanned gathering in Paris brought together several former African Jazz veterans, including Joseph Mulamba "Mujos" Kwamy Munsi, Casimir Mbilia "Casino", Bombenga, Jean Serge Essous, and Tino Baroza, for a studio session released under the African Jazz label. These encounters, however, strained relations between Bombenga and Kabasele. By June 1967, a disagreement prompted Bombenga to depart and revive Vox Africa, effectively ending Kabasele's efforts to fully reconstitute African Jazz. That same year, during the Organisation of African Unity (OAU) summit held at the Cité de l'OUA in Kinshasa, Kabasele composed "Carrefour Addis Abeba", which he distributed copies to visiting delegates.

Following the 1961 assassination of Patrice Lumumba, who had appointed him Secretary of Information, Kabasele went into exile in Paris in 1963. In 1969, at the initiative of Kabasele and Manu Dibango, a collective including Essous, Edo Clari, Mujos, and the Cuban musician Gonzalo Fernandez formed the short-lived band African Team (or L'African Team de Paris), described as Kabasele's "last musical refuge". The band recorded Kallé et L'African Team Vol. 1, an album blending Congolese rumba with pachanga, mambo, charanga, and merengue. Kabasele co-wrote works with Mujos ("Ma Préférée Irène", "Tozongela Dilanda", "Barubatsie", "Bebe Ilenda"), Edouard Lutula ("Cococo... Qui Est La", "Mokili Ngonga"), Gonzalo Fernandez ("Minueyo Boongalo"), Mujos ("Essous Spiritou"), Dede ("Mokili Ngonga"), and collaborated with Tino Baroza, and Dibango on "Nzela Mosika". Dibango wrote "Kara-Kara", while Fernandez's flute introduced a distinctive charanga influence, complemented by Dibango's alternating use of saxophone and organ on two boogaloo-inspired tracks.

In 1971, Kabasele and African Team released "Safari Muzuri", a narrative composition depicting a journey along the KDL railway line (Kalemie–Dilolo–Lubumbashi). Unlike the romance-oriented travel songs typical of the period, "Safari Muzuri" was a moral exhortation to passengers traveling on the KDL route. Kabasele remained in Paris until 1973, after which he returned to Kinshasa and made occasional guest appearances with bands such as Orchestre G.O. Malebo, TPOK Jazz, and Baninga de Madiata. Despite repeated attempts to revive African Jazz, he was unable to restore the band to its former status.

== Personnel ==
=== Core bandleader ===
Name	Also known as	Instrument and role
Joseph Athanase Tshamala Kabasele	Le Grand Kallé	Bandleader, lead vocals, composer

=== Vocalists ===
Name	Instrument and role
Victor Longomba	Lead vocals, maracas
Tabu Ley Rochereau	Vocals, composer
Franklin Boukaka	Vocals
Pépé Kallé	Vocals
Casimir Mbilia	Vocals
Joseph Mulamba "Mujos"	Vocals
Jean Mossi Kwami "Kwamy Munsi"	Vocals
Dede	Vocals (song co-writer)
Lucie Eyenga	Vocals
Matthieu Kuka	Vocals
Alex Mayukuta	Vocals
Joseph Munange "Maproco"	Vocals
Jeannot Bombenga	Vocals
Antoine Kaya "Depuissant"	Vocals

=== Guitarists ===
Name	Instrument and role
Nico Kasanda	Lead guitar, composer
Charles "Déchaud" Mwamba	Rhythm/lead guitar, composer
Papa Noël Nedule	Guitar
Jacques Mambau "Jacky"	Guitar
Emmanuel Antoine Tshilumba wa Baloji "Tino Baroza"	Guitar, vocals
Albert Dinga	Guitar
Albert Tawumani	Double bass
Yamba Yamba Kabondo	Acoustic guitar
Joseph Mwena	Double bass
Dicky Nicolas Tshilumba "Dicky Baroza"	Guitar
André Kambeta "Damoiseau"	Guitar

=== Horn players ===
Name	Instrument and role
Manu Dibango	Saxophone, organ, arranger
Jean Serge Essous	Saxophone/clarinet
Isaac Musekiwa	Saxophone
Fud Candrix	Saxophone
Edouard Lutula "Edo Clari"	Clarinet, organ, arranger
Michel Yuma Kasongo "Michel Sax"	Saxophone/flute
Willy Mbembe	Trumpet
André Menga	Saxophone

=== Rhythm section (bass, drums, percussion) ===
Name	Instrument and role
Antoine Mwango Armando "Brazzos"	Double bass/contrabass
Pierre "Petit Pierre" Yantula Elengesa	Drums
Jean "Rolly" Nsita	Bass/rhythm section
Casimir Mutshipule "Casino"	Rhythm section (bass/percussion)
Roger Izeidi	Percussion
Antoine Kaya "Depuissant"	Tumbas

=== Keyboards and multi-instrumentalists ===
Name	Instrument and role
Edouard Lutula "Edo Clari"	Organ, clarinet, arranger
Emmanuel Antoine Tshilumba wa Baloji "Tino Baroza"	Organ/keyboards
Foster Manzikala	Keyboards/musical direction

== Discography ==
=== Singles ===
- Parafifi
- Indépendance Cha Cha
- Table Ronde
- African Jazz Mokili Mobimba

And dozens of others.

=== Contributing artist ===
- The Rough Guide to Congo Gold (2008, World Music Network)
