= Table Ronde =

Song by Le Grand Kallé et l'African Jazz
- Language: Lingala and French
- Released: 1960
- Genre: African Rumba
- Length: 2:58
- Label: Fonior
- Songwriter: Joseph Kabasele

"Table Ronde" was a successful song written by Joseph Kabasele in the popular Congolese rumba style and performed by his band L'African Jazz. It was written for the Round Table Conference on Congolese independence held in Brussels, Belgium, in 1960, which gave the song its name.

== History ==
In December 1959 it was announced that a round table conference would be held in Brussels, Belgium, in 1960 to discuss the future of the Belgian Congo. Joseph Kabasele's L'African Jazz and OK Jazz were both invited to perform at the event. Only two musicians from OK Jazz were able to attend, so they briefly performed with L'African Jazz. Kabasele took part in the conference, and collaborated with his musicians to produce some songs to commemorate the event. The most notable of these were "Table Ronde" and "Indépendance Cha Cha". While "Indépendance Cha Cha" was celebratory, "Table Ronde" was more assertive for the cause of Congolese independence. It featured a guitar solo by Nico Kasanda. The song marked a new shift in Congolese popular music away from a care-free attitude towards militant politics.

During the conference the group recorded their two compositions (along with a piece by OK Jazz vocalist Victor Longomba, "Vive Patrice Lumumba") in a His Master's Voice–affiliated studio. The record label was not interested in the recordings, so Kabasele showed the masters to various other companies before reaching an agreement with Fonior.

== Impact and legacy ==
Musician Gilles Sala later said that Table Ronde and the other songs released with it "sent a musical shock wave. It was pretty extraordinary, this spontaneous, natural music."

Table Ronde is performed in one of the scenes of the 2000 film Lumumba, directed by Raoul Peck.
