= Indépendance Cha Cha =

Song by L'African Jazz
- Language: Lingala; Kikongo; French
- B-side: "Naweli Boboto"
- Released: February 1, 1960
- Genre: Congolese rumba
- Length: 3:05
- Label: Fonior
- Songwriter: Joseph "Grand Kallé" Kabasele

"Indépendance Cha Cha" (French; "Independence cha cha") was a song performed by Joseph Kabasele (best known by his stage name Le Grand Kallé) from the group L'African Jazz in the popular Congolese rumba style. The song has been described as "Kabasele's most memorable song" and one of the first Pan-African hits.

The song was composed by Grand Kallé and first performed in 1960, the so-called Year of Africa, to celebrate the imminent independence of the Belgian Congo (the modern-day and Democratic Republic of the Congo). The song achieved considerable successes and remains the most internationally best-known examples of the Congolese rumba.

== Background ==
In 1959, the Belgian government decided to host a Belgo-Congolese Round Table Conference in Brussels to discuss the political future of the Belgian Congo. One of the Congolese delegates to the conference was politician Daniel Kanza. Two of his sons, Thomas and Philippe, decided they should invite a group of Congolese musicians to the conference under the leadership of Joseph Kabasele so as to keep the delegates entertained. In late 1959 Thomas formally extended an invitation to Kabasele, who led the band African Jazz, and Victor Longomba, bandleader of OK Jazz. Longomba consulted fellow band member Franco Luambo, who stated that he could not attend because OK Jazz had preexisting engagements. Ultimately Longomba and OK Jazz guitarist Armando Brazzos chose to accompany Kabasele and African Jazz members Nico Kasanda, Déchaud Mwamba and Roger Izeidi. Together with conga drummer Pierre Yatula, they were to play under the name African Jazz.

== Composition and recording ==
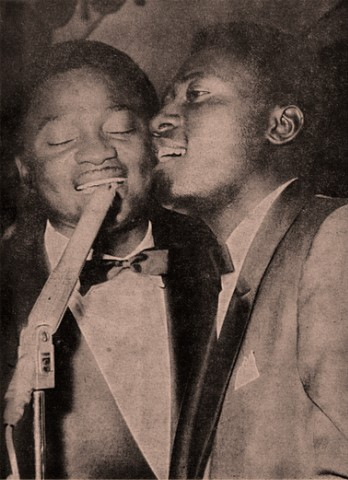
Joseph Kabasele (left) and Vicky Longomba (right) performing at the Round Table Conference in February 1960

As a prominent Congolese cultural figure, Kabasele and his band, African Jazz, were chosen to accompany the Congolese delegation to Brussels, Belgium for the Congolese Round Table Conference on Congolese independence in early 1960. Kabasele took part in the discussions. The song was written on 20 January 1960, incorporating instruments and rhythms of music of the African diaspora, particularly Cuba. It was first played at the Hotel Plaza in Brussels on 1 February 1960.

It was sung by Longomba and Kasanda played the guitar. For the first performance of the song at the conference, Le Grand Kallé brought together four musicians from his own band, L'African Jazz (Kasanda, Roger Izeidi, Pierre Yatula and Déchaud Mwamba) along with two members of the rival band, OK Jazz (Longomba and Armando Brazzos).

The group recorded the song during the Round Table Conference, along with Kabasele's "Table Ronde" and Longomba's "Vive Patrice Lumumba", in a His Master's Voice–affiliated studio. The record label was not interested in the recordings, so Kabasele showed the masters to various other companies before reaching an agreement with Fonior to release it.

== Lyrics ==
The song's lyrics called for unity in the post-independence Congo between the different factions and prominent figures of the nationalist movement in the Congo. The refrain attributed the achievement of independence entirely to the Congolese people:

Indépendance cha-cha, tozoui e
Oh! Kimpwanza cha-cha, tubakidi
Oh! Table Ronde cha-cha, ba gagné o
Oh! Dipanda cha-cha tozoui e.

(Independence, cha-cha, we've won it
Oh! Independence cha-cha, we've achieved it
Oh! The round table cha-cha, we've pulled it off
Oh! Independence, cha-cha, we've won it.)

The principal verses of the song include the acronyms for the major political factions within the Congolese pro-independence movement. The Association des Ressortisants du Haut-Congo (ASSORECO), Alliance des Bakongo (ABAKO), Confédération des associations tribales du Katanga (CONAKAT), Cartel Katangais (Cartel), Front Commun, Mouvement National Congolais (MNC), Parti National du Progrès (PNP), UGECO, Alliance des Bayanzi (ABAZI) and Parti Solidaire Africain (PSA) are all mentioned.

A number of politicians (some of them party leaders) are mentioned by surname. In order, these are: Jean Bolikango, Joseph Kasa-Vubu, Patrice Lumumba, Albert Kalonji, Paul Bolya, Moise Tshombe, Cléophas Kamitatu, Ferdinand Essandja and Daniel Kanza.

== Reception ==
From its first diffusion, the song proved extremely popular and has been described as the "first Pan-African hit". Musician Gilles Sala later said that it (along with the other two His Master's Voice recordings) "sent a musical shock wave. It was pretty extraordinary, this spontaneous, natural music." Although Debout Congolais and La Zaïroise each officially served at different periods as emblems of the Congolese state, Belgian cultural historian David Van Reybrouck observed in Congo: The Epic History of a People that, since independence, "there has only been one true Congolese national anthem, one little tune that to this day spontaneously gets all of Central Africa dancing: the playful, light and moving music of Indépendance cha cha".

The choice of language in "Indépendance Cha Cha", Lingala, supplemented by French loanwords, meant that the song also became a hit in the neighbouring French Congo where the language was also widely spoken. It was widely broadcast across Africa by Radio Congo Belge. The song's tune and optimistic lyrics chimed with the popular mood in Africa, particularly in Francophone countries, many of them made independent in 1960 or soon after. "Indépendance Cha Cha" was adopted as the "song of the emancipation of the dark continent" and became extremely popular across Africa, although it achieved longest-lasting success in the modern-day Democratic Republic of the Congo. When Rwanda became independent on 1 July 1962, a youth group marched through Kigali singing the song.

== Adaptations and appearances ==
"Indépendance Cha Cha" is performed in one of the scenes of the 2000 film Lumumba, directed by Raoul Peck. It also appeared in Peck's documentary Lumumba, la mort d'un prophète. Belgian-Congolese rapper Baloji reimagined it as "Le Jour d'Après" ("the day after"), performed by Siku Ya Baadaye on the 2011 album Kinshasa Succursale. Gérard Addat created a version called "La Liberté Cha Cha", while the Haitian band Tabou Combo released "Rumba Liberté" in 2011.

== See also ==
- "Table Ronde", another song by Le Grand Kallé about Congolese independence.
- Congo Crisis (1960–65)
- Cha-cha-cha (music)

== Bibliography ==
- Bensignor, François (29 April 2010). ""Indépendance Cha Cha": Histoire d'un tube". Mondomix. Archived from the original on 27 June 2013.
- De Groof, Matthias, ed. (2020). Lumumba in the Arts. Leuven University Press. ISBN 9789462701748.
- Dicale, Bertrand (2011). Les chansons qui ont tout changé. Lib. Artheme Fayard. ISBN 9782213665368.
- Kabasele, Joseph (1985). Hommage à Grand Kallé. Editions Lokole.
- Mabanckou, Alain (8 July 2010). "Indépendance cha-cha". Libération.
- Millward, Steve (2012). Changing Times: Music and Politics in 1964. Troubador Publishing Ltd. ISBN 9781780887333.
- Ndaliko, Chérie Rivers (2016). Necessary Noise: Music, Film, and Charitable Imperialism in the East of Congo. Oxford University Press. ISBN 9780190499594.
- Stewart, Gary. "Kabasele, Joseph "Le Grand Kalle"". Rumba on the River. Cold Run Books. Archived from the original on 20 April 2013.
- Stewart, Gary (2003). Rumba on the River: A History of the Popular Music of the Two Congos (illustrated ed.). Verso. p. 86. ISBN 9781859843680.
