= Editions Esengo =

Former recording studio in the Congo

- Founded: 1956
- Founder: Dino Antonopoulos
- Status: Defunct
- Genre: African music
- Country of origin: Belgian Congo (now Democratic Republic of the Congo)
- Location: Léopoldville (now Kinshasa)

Editions Esengo was a record studio in the Congo, which is noted for assembling to their label Rock-a-Mambo, African Jazz, and Conga Jazz, three of the great powerhouse bands of Congolese rumba. Esengo is taken from the Lingala language, and is the word for "happiness" or "joy."

In 1956, a Greek businessman, Dino Antonopoulos, sought to start a new music publishing firm in Leopoldville (Kinshasa). He established the enterprise by purchasing material from the recently defunct Opika record label and recruiting Loningisa guitarist and composer Henri Bowane to be artistic director of the firm. This proved to be a great blow to the Loningisa recording label, as Bowane brought with him such amazing talent as: Jean Serge Essous, Philippe Rossignol Lando, Saturnin Pandi, Liengo Honoré, Augustin Moniania "Roitelet." In 1957 Bowane was able to convince saxophonist Nino Malapet, then a player for Editions Loningisa and member of OK Jazz, to defect and join Essous and Rossignol, as well as other members of Esengo, to form Orchestre Rock-a-Mambo. Meanwhile, the Esengo firm managed to enlist Joseph Kabaselle's orchestra African Jazz as well as Paul "DeWayon" Ebengo's Conga Jazz creating a remarkable stable of performers.

== See also ==
- List of record labels
