= Parafifi =

Single by Le Grand Kallé et l'African Jazz
- Released: 1952 or 1953 (original version) c. 1961 (reissue)
- Recorded: 1952 or 1953; 1960s
- Genre: Congolese rumba
- Length: 3:17
- Label: Opika; Surboum African Jazz
- Songwriter: Joseph Kabasele
- Producer: Gilbert Warnant

Parafifi is a Congolese rumba song written by Le Grand Kallé during the early 1950s. It is considered one of the earliest recordings of modern Congolese popular music. The song is generally believed to have been recorded for the Opika label in either 1952 or 1953 by a group of Congolese and Belgian musicians that included Le Grand Kallé, guitarists Docteur Nico and Charles "Déchaud" Mwamba, saxophonist Alfons "Fud" Candrix, and producer Gilbert Warnant.

According to Congolese music journalist Samuel Malonga Nkilutomba Luba Mabitidi, the title "Parafifi" was a portmanteau of Paraiso ("Para") and Jeanne-Félicité Safou-Safouesse ("Fifi"), a well-known couple of the time. "Parafifi" became a smash hit on both banks of the Congo River and helped boost Le Grand Kallé's standing as a leading figure in Congolese rumba. A 1961 remake released on the Surboum African Jazz label by African Jazz eventually eclipsed the original recording in popularity and became the version through which the song was best known. More than five decades later, Sam Mangwana revisited the song on his 2016 album Lubamba, recording it under the title "Félicité".

== Background, earliest version, and inspiration ==
Planet Ilunga, a Belgian record label focused on preserving, documenting, and promoting Congolese rumba of the 1950s and 1960s, the origins of "Parafifi" date back to the early 1950s, before African Jazz was formed. Le Grand Kallé had started recording and performing for the Opika label around 1950. At roughly the same time, Nicolas Kasanda wa Mikalay (popularly known as Docteur Nico) and his older brother Charles "Déchaud" Mwamba were making their mark on the Léopoldville music scene. Le Grand Kallé brought them into his circle after recognizing their talent.

According to the Beninese online outlet Visages du Bénin, Marie José Sombo also collaborated with him and is said to have written "Parafifi" in dedication to Jeanne Félicité Safou-Safouesse, although many other sources attribute the composition solely to Le Grand Kallé. The recording session also included the Belgian tenor saxophonist Alfons "Fud" Candrix, then a session musician for Opika, who is often credited with introducing the saxophone into Congolese rumba. Another Belgian, Gilbert Warnant, who worked as a sound engineer and producer for Opika, participated and added Solovox organ accompaniment. Planet Ilunga notes that this "fivesome", including Congolese and Belgian artists, was chiefly responsible for recording the earliest known version of "Parafifi" in 1952. Planet Ilunga also points out that a Pathé 45-rpm release featuring "Parafifi" credited the recording to Kabaselle et son ensemble Saxo Fud Candrix. For record collectors, the same recording appears on the compilation African Jazz 1960, a title that can be considered misleading because the collection consists of eight tracks recorded for the Opika label, which had already closed its doors in 1957. The track is likewise available on a Pathé Marconi 45-rpm release distributed during the 1960s.

Not all accounts agree on the 1952 date, however. Several sources identify 1953 as the year of recording. Congolese music journalist Samuel Malonga Nkilutomba Luba Mabitidi states that the song was recorded at Opika that year on a 78-rpm disc, catalogued as number 1779, and credits guitarist Docteur Nico among the participants. He also explains that the record contained two compositions by Le Grand Kallé, featuring "Parafifi" on Side A and "Yallee" on Side B. Music critic Frédéric Mafina of the Agence d'Information d'Afrique Centrale likewise supports the view that the recording took place in 1953.

Mabitidi explains that the title "Parafifi" was a portmanteau of the names of a young couple well known at the time. The song pays tribute to Paraiso ("Para") and Félicité ("Fifi"), whose relationship was widely recognized. Paraiso, who was originally from Dahomey (modern-day Benin), was a close friend of Le Grand Kallé. Félicité, born Jeanne-Félicité Safou-Safouesse in 1933 in Albertville (now Kalemie) on the shores of Lake Tanganyika, was the daughter of parents from Congo-Brazzaville. She later worked for Radio AEF (French Equatorial Africa Radio) in Brazzaville, becoming the station's first African female announcer during the 1950s. When "Parafifi" was released, she was only twenty years old. Le Grand Kallé sent her a copy of the recording, and the song soon received extensive airplay on her station. Its popularity spread rapidly, making it a hit throughout the two Congos. Some accounts suggest that she subsequently developed a romantic relationship with Le Grand Kallé. Although trained as a teacher, Félicité Safouesse went on to build a prominent career in radio and television, seizing audiences through programs such as Le concert des auditeurs ("the listeners' concert") and Dites-le par le disque ("say it through a record").

== Other versions ==
=== Surboum African Jazz version (1961) ===
A later version of "Parafifi" was issued on Le Grand Kallé's Surboum African Jazz label in the early 1960s, most likely in 1961, during the period when African Jazz underwent a split. The lead guitar part is thought to have been performed by André Kambeta, also known as "Damoiseau". Released as a 45-rpm single, the record included only one track from the original release. On catalog number AJ 56, the re-recorded version of "Parafifi" was placed on Side B, while Side A featured "Chérie Madona", a new composition by Edouard Lutula "Edo Clari". This remake became better known than the original recording, which gradually disappeared from public attention. In 2016, Sam Mangwana revisited this version on his album Lubamba, recording it under the title "Félicité".

=== Cha-cha-cha version ===
There is also a cha-cha-cha version of the song, although its recording date remains uncertain.

== Musical style and lyrics ==
Musically, "Parafifi" exemplifies early traits of Congolese rumba: melodic vocals, fingerstyle guitar picking, binary structure, and syncopated rhythms. The original version emphasizes slow tempo and emotion, while the 1961 version is more dance-oriented.

The song is performed in Lingala. The lyrics extol the radiant beauty of Jeanne-Félicité Safou-Safouesse while also alluding to her lover Paraiso:

"Félicité, mwana mwasi suka botembe, oy'a lelo obebisi mokili awa. Na mopanzi, tala elenge ya Paraiso, amipesi nyonso se na yo", which may be loosely translated in English as: "Félicité, an extraordinarily beautiful young woman, today your beauty has caused great commotion in this world. By your side stands young Paraiso, who has devoted himself entirely to you".

In another passage, Le Grand Kallé intones: "Félicité Di Doudou, motema ya Paraiso", translating as "Félicité, Di Doudou, the heart of Paraiso". The pronunciation of "Paraiso" in Le Grand Kallé's delivery often came across as "Para-iso", which caused some listeners to mistakenly interpret it as "Paradiso", meaning "paradise".

According to music journalist Wendy Mukoko of CELSA Sorbonne University, male rumba musicians of this era frequently adopted the language of courtly love when writing about women. She argues that these portrayals often incorporate aspects of Mami Wata. In this representation, the woman is admired for her beauty, and the male lover surrenders himself to her, much as a knight devoted himself to his beloved or as men in traditional stories surrendered themselves to Mami Wata. This archetype is clearly present in "Parafifi", where Félicité is addressed with phrases such as, "My beautiful creature, I give myself completely to you" and "Your face drives me completely mad; your teeth are like gold". Mukoko notes that these lyrics combine courtly imagery with references associated with Mami Wata by focusing on ideal beauty, comparisons to precious materials, and the lover's emotional downfall.

== Cultural influence ==
Several scholars have emphasized "Parafifi"'s importance in Le Grand Kallé's career. According to writer François Ondai Akiera, it represents "Kallé and African Jazz's quintessential romantic opus". The inclusion of Congolese rumba on UNESCO's Intangible Cultural Heritage list in 2021 helped renew interest in key songs like "Parafifi".
