= The Rough Guide to Congo Gold =

Compilation album by Various artists
- Released: 12 February 2008
- Genres: World; Congolese rumba
- Length: 76:13
- Label: World Music Network

Full series chronology
The Rough Guide to Cuban Street Party (2008)	The Rough Guide to Congo Gold (2008)	The Rough Guide to African Street Party (2008)

The Rough Guide to Congo Gold is a world music compilation album originally released in 2008. Part of the World Music Network Rough Guides series, the release focuses on the Congolese rumba genre of the Democratic Republic of the Congo, with tracks from the 1960s to 90s. The compilation was produced by Phil Stanton, co-founder of the World Music Network. Martin Sinnock compiled the tracks and wrote the liner notes, and Brad Haynes & Marisa Lassman coordinated the project.

== Critical reception ==
Professional ratings
Review scores
Source	Rating
Robert Christgau	A
PopMatters	7/10 stars
AllMusic	4/5 stars
Mojo	4/5 stars

The album met critical appraise upon release. In his review for AllMusic, Chris Nickson wrote that the album does a "first-rate job" in illustrating the genre and gives an "object lesson in what made it so wonderful". Robert Christgau called it "as playable as Afrocomps get". Writing for PopMatters, Nate Cunningham rose the issue of artists being "almost exclusively names you can find in the Wikipedia entry on soukous", but gave it a pass, saying it's less an "aural equivalent of a picture-postcard" than other introductory world music compilations. John Goddard of the Toronto Star agreed with Cunningham that "every artist belongs to the pantheon", but called every song a "nugget".

== Track listing ==
No.	Title	Artist	Length
1.	"Marie Louise"	Henri Bowane & Wendo Kolosoy	3:23
2.	"Parafifi"	Grand Kalle & L'African Jazz	5:13
3.	"Adios Tete"	L'African Jazz & Tabu Ley Rochereau	2:46
4.	"Mamu Wa Mpoy"	African Fiesta & Doctor Nico	3:20
5.	"Marcello Tozongana"	Verckys & Orchestre Vévé	5:30
6.	"Azda"	Franco & TPOK Jazz	7:33
7.	"Nakweyi Carreau"	Afrisa International & Tabu Ley Rochereau	4:48
8.	"Tchimurenga Zimbabwe"	Sam Mangwana	7:28
9.	"Eswi Yo Wapi"	M'bilia Bel & Tabu Ley Rochereau	9:03
10.	"Mujinga"	Franco & TPOK Jazz	10:35
11.	"Bon Samaritain"	Papa Noël	6:33
12.	"Biya"	Madilu System	10:01
