= Greeks in the Democratic Republic of the Congo =

Έλληνες στην Λαϊκή Δημοκρατία του Κονγκό

Total population
- 68,000

Regions with significant populations
- Lubumbashi, Kinshasa, Boma, Kananga, Kisangani, Mbuji-Mayi and Goma.

Languages
- French, Greek, Lingala, at some degree Dutch.

Religion
- Greek Orthodox Church, Roman Catholicism and Irreligion

Related ethnic groups
- Greeks, White Africans of European ancestry

The first communities of the Greeks in the Democratic Republic of the Congo were established prior to Belgian colonization. The Greek presence reached a peak in the 1950s when many Greeks fled Egypt following the revolution of 1952. The Greek communities organized their own schools and churches and Greeks were active in trade, fishing, transport, coffee growing and the music industry. Also, a small group of Greek Jews emigrated to the Congo in the early 20th Century.

== History ==
=== Colonial era ===
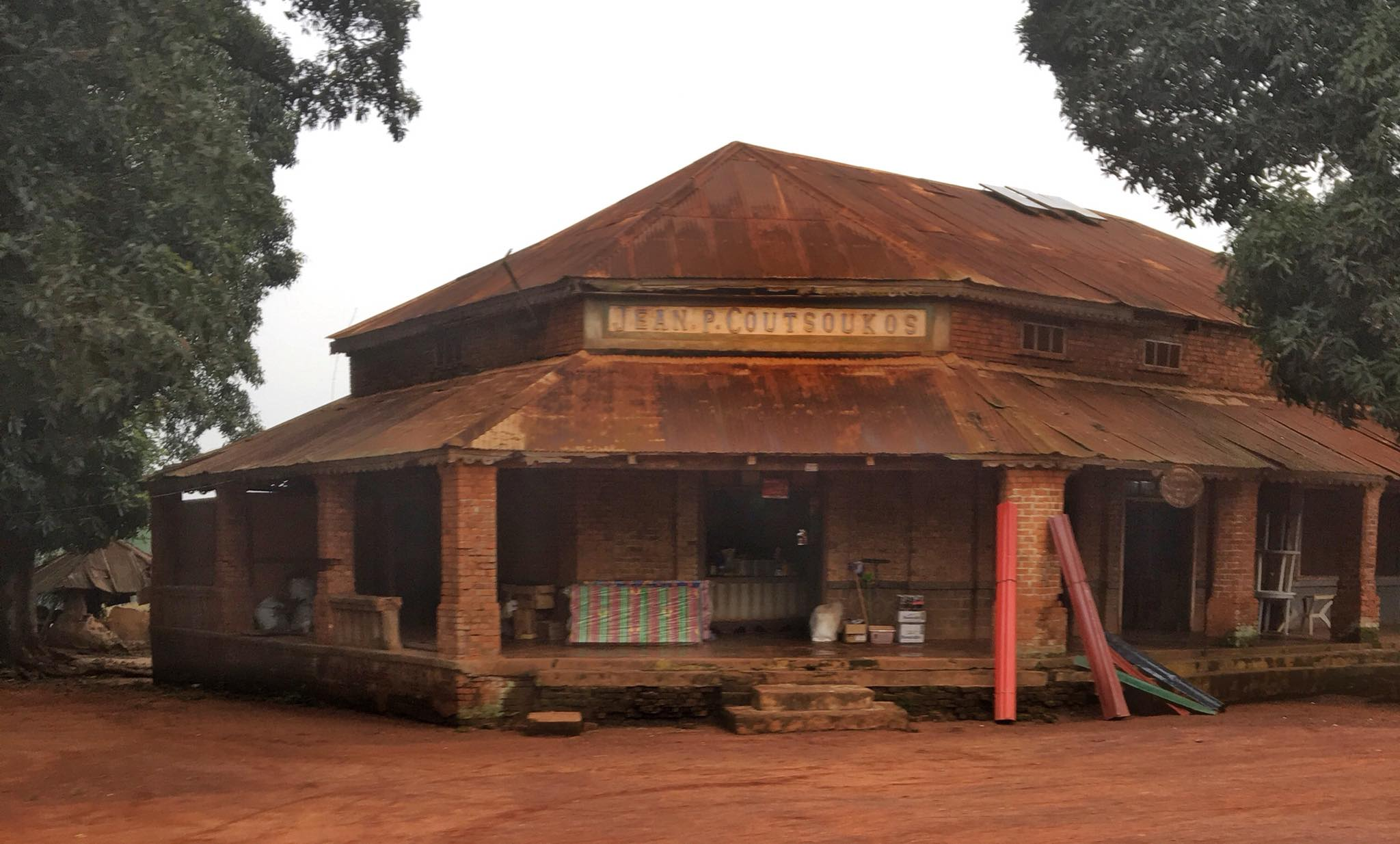
Former Greek emporium (Jean P. Coutsoukos) in Dungu, Orientale Province.

In the early to mid 20th century nearly all Congolese cities on the Belgian side had a Greek community and usually all hailing from a particular part of Greece as people would arrive, get settled in and send for their families. By the 1920s there were established Greek fishing and trading communities in the trading cities of Luapula and Katanga, where the Greeks plied the river trade of the Congo River, ranging as far as Zambia where many settled. The traders and fishermen developed a good and likable reputation and cultivated good relations with their Congolese and Zambian colleagues as they were always ready to offer help or lend their equipment and traditional Greek skills in net and boat making. During the Second World War, some 2,700 Greek refugees lived in camps in Eastern Congo. They had earlier escaped Nazi occupation and famine conditions in the Aegean Islands and stayed in Belgian Congo in comparably safety and comfort from 1942 to 1945. Ethnic Greeks also played a historically significant role in the production and dissemination of Congolese music, and most of the country's record companies were founded and run by Greeks, including Ngoma, Loningisa, Opika, and CEFA. The last significant wave of Greek immigration to the Congo occurred in the late 1950s and early 1960s, consisting primarily of immigrants from Egypt who left as part of the mass exodus of foreigners from the country.

=== Post-independence ===
When the country declared its independence in 1960 there were violent clashes and uncertainty followed by three decades of totalitarian rule by Mobutu Sese Seko which led to the exodus of many Greek settlers and a decline in the Greek community. Under Mobutu's regime, the remaining Zairian Greeks maintained a strong monopoly on casinos throughout the country and fishing enterprises operating on Lake Tanganyika, and controlled a large share of the nation's hotel sector. As of 1987, Greeks owned eleven casinos in Kinshasa alone. The bulk of Greek-owned commercial enterprises were in the Eastern half of Zaire during this period. In 1973-74, many larger Greek-owned businesses were seized as part of Mobutu's Zairianisation reforms, but starting in 1976 many of these enterprises were returned to their Greek owners. When the Zairian government reversed its Zairianisation policy in 1976 due to economic downturn, it was unable to attract many of the Europeans (especially Belgians) who left the country to return, and instead relied on Greek and other Southern European residents of Zaire to revitalize the agricultural and small industry sectors.

Around the year 2000 there were about 100 Greeks left in the capital Kinshasa and 200 in Lubumbashi. The holy temple of Saint George and the Club Hellenique are the focal points of the community. In 2006, 5,000 Greeks lived in the DR Congo. Greek presence in modern Lubumbashi (former Elisabethville) has its roots in the 1920s. It is reported that in 1917, about 150 Greeks lived in the city the surrounding forests. More Greeks settled in the area during the periods 1936–39 and 1946–48. The Hellenic Community was established in 1923.The Hellenic Community of Lubumbashi appears very active. The schools of the Hellenic Community of Lubumbashi (SHCL) were founded in 1968 and operate since.

== See also ==
- Greek diaspora
- Greeks in South Africa
- Greeks in Zimbabwe
- Greece–Zimbabwe relations
