= Kamulangu =

Folk song (Congo)

Kamulangu is a Luba folk song sung in the Tshiluba language. It has an associated traditional dance.

== Summary ==
Kamulangu is sung in the Tshiluba language. The song (and its dance) is about the birth of a child who unifies the tribes of a region and brings an end to a drought. The word kamulangu translates as "fecundity" or "pregnancy". The central lyrics are as follows:

Kamulangu wa kamulangu'ee, kamulangu
Kamulagu matumba dikumi'ee,
Kamulangu, matumbee, wayiyoyi wee
Bukwa bisambee vwakunwayi nuvwa kumona
Mudi Mikombu wabanya mpeta ya bena Maweja,
Wa ndomba, kamulangu'ee lele, kamulangu
Wa ndomba, kamulangu'ee lele, kamulangu

== History ==
Kamulangu began as a song of praise for a tribal chief named Kamulangu, but then was used in children's theatre before being appropriated as a popular Christmas song. During Mobutu Sese Seko's rule over the Congo it was sung in praise of him, and its dance achieved national popularity.

In the late 1960s the musical genre Soukous emerged in the Congo. Congolese musicians noted the likeness of Soukous dances to traditional movements, so they began recording traditional songs to Soukous rhythms, among them Kamulangu. In 1970 guitarist Nico Kasanda wrote a variant of the song, recorded it with his band, Orchestre African Fiesta Sukisa, and released it to much success in Kinshasa. Tabu Ley Rochereau and his Orchestre Afrisa International released their own popular version two years later.
