= Poto-Poto =

Poto-Poto is one of the urban arrondissements (boroughs) of the city of Brazzaville, capital of the Republic of the Congo.

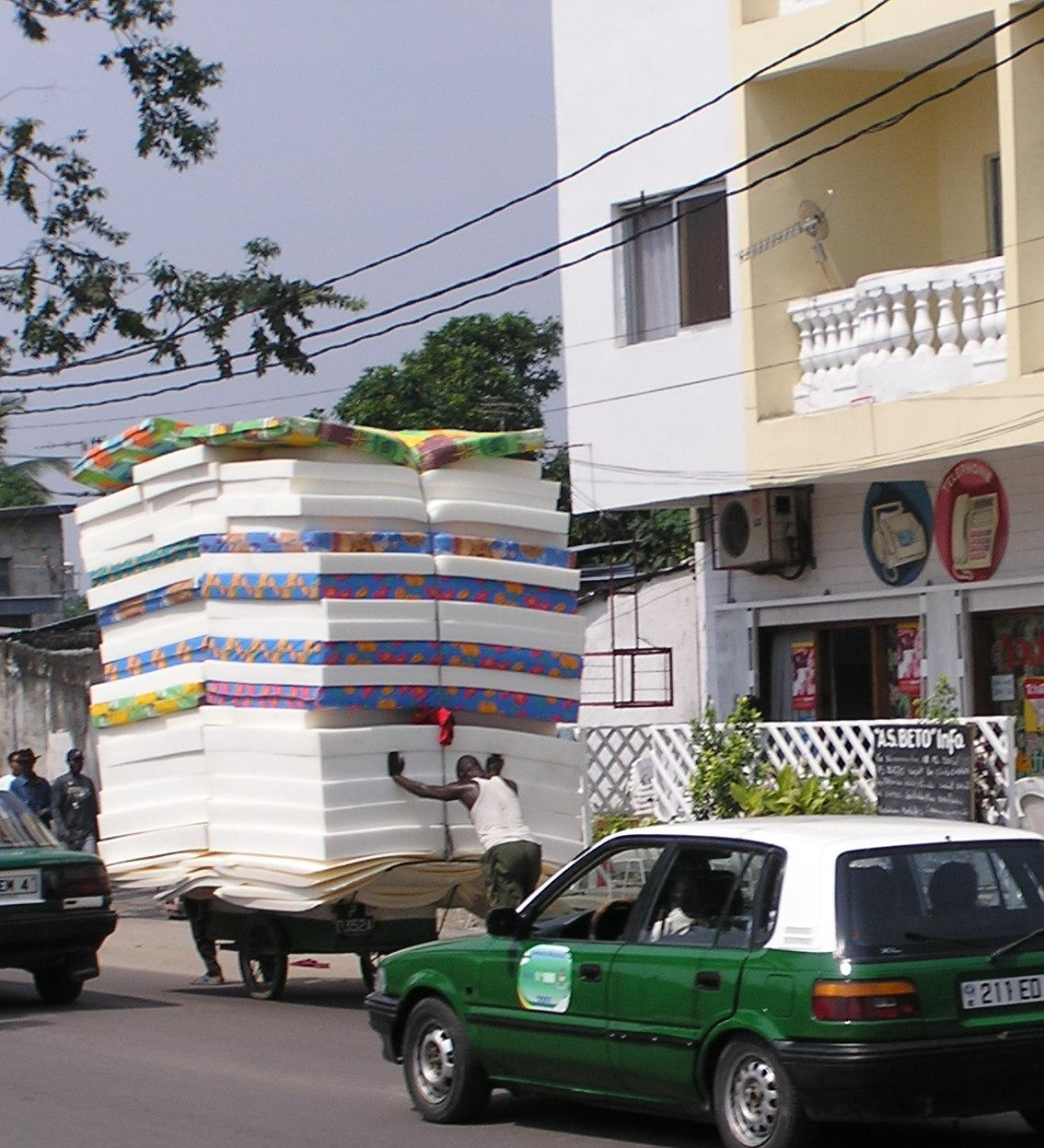
Avenue de France, in Poto-Poto

== History ==
Poto-Poto was originally demarcated by French colonizers in 1909, to the northeast of the central part of town (simply called la ville in French) which was reserved for white residents only. Meanwhile, to the southwest, the neighborhood of Bacongo was also established. The French founded both Poto-Poto and Bacongo in order to create residential zones for the African workers who had begun flocking to the growing city. Initially, Bacongo drew migrants from the southern part of the colony, while Poto-Poto was settled by migrants from the north and central regions, as well as by immigrants from other African colonies, including Chad, Oubangui-Chari (now the Central African Republic) and various parts of West Africa. In fact, the name Poto-Poto comes from the word in the Bambara language meaning "watery mud"—so named because the neighborhood is located in a low-lying area which tends to flood during heavy rains. Still today, streets in Poto-Poto reflect the diverse origins of the neighborhood's inhabitants: they bear the names of distant places (e.g., Rue Dahomey, Rue Yaoundé) and of ethnic groups (e.g., Rue Bateke, Rue Zande, Rue Mbochi). Within five years of its founding, Poto-Poto was subdivided by colonial authorities into units organized by common ethnicity, and quickly became the most densely populated section of the city.

In 1959, during the run-up to decolonization, Poto-Poto was the scene of violence which touched off a major political conflict between northern and southern Congolese and which soon engulfed all of Brazzaville. During the June–October 1997 civil war, Poto-Poto was thoroughly looted by "Cobra" militiamen loyal to opposition leader Denis Sassou Nguesso and was shelled by forces loyal to President Pascal Lissouba.

Poto-Poto is one of Brazzaville's seven arrondissements or administrative districts.

== Geography ==
The neighborhood is cross-cut by two main paved arteries, Avenue de la Paix which runs north–south and Avenue de France which runs east–west. Nearly every other street in Poto-Poto is unpaved; most are called ruelles (alleyways) in French. The railyards of the Congo-Ocean Railway border Poto-Poto to the south. To the north lies the district of Moungali, an extension of the arrondissement of Poto-Poto (sometimes referred to as "Poto-Poto Deux") but a large and mostly residential neighborhood in its own right. Poto-Poto is bordered on the east by the residential neighborhood of Ouenzé, and on the west by the government/commercial zone known as le Plateau.

== Notable features ==
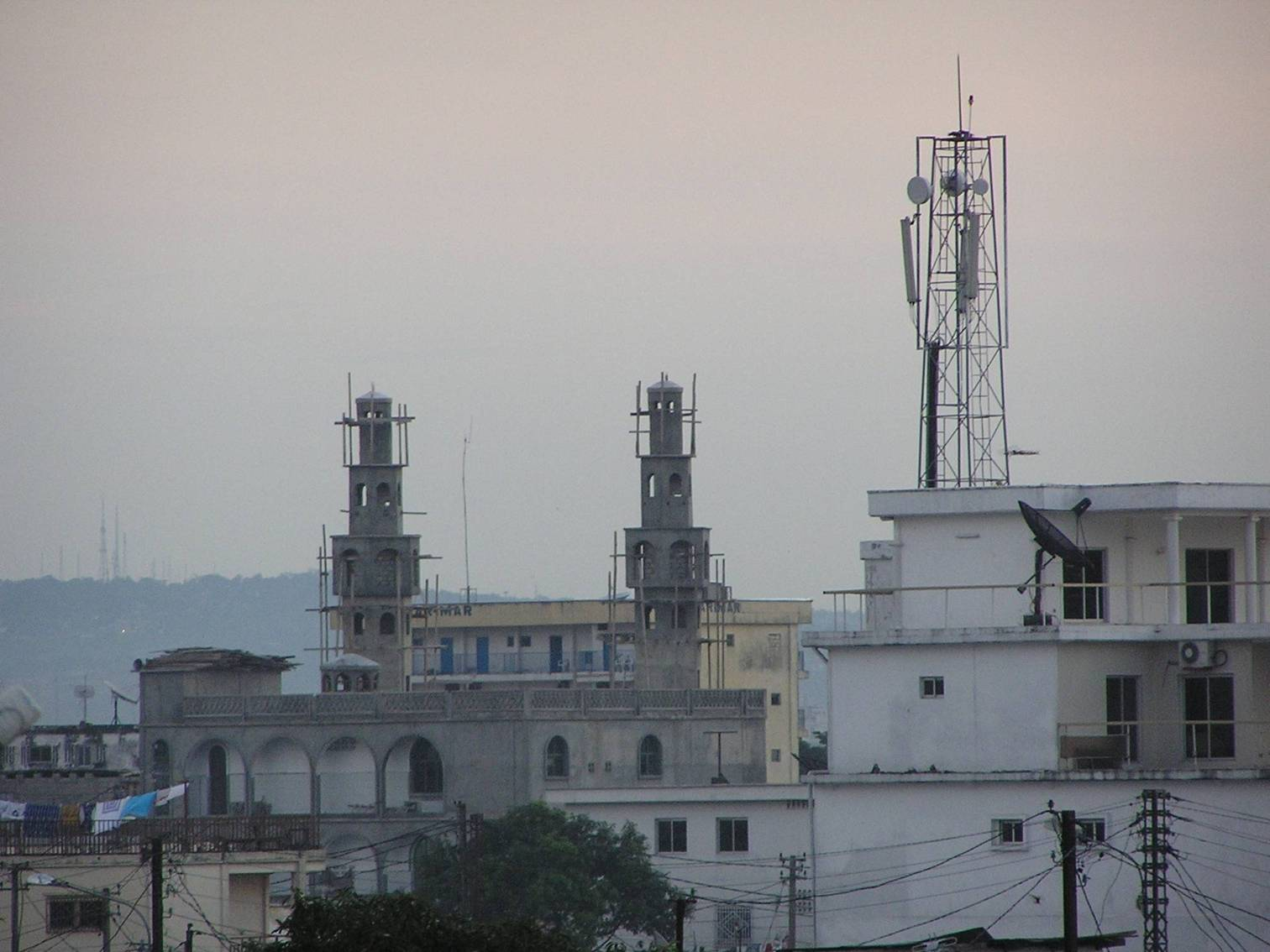
Evening view of Poto-Poto: Visible in background is the Malikiyya Mosque (with scaffolding around the minarets) and the Hotel Marimar; the hills on the horizon are across the Congo River in Kinshasa.

Poto-Poto is home to the Sainte-Anne Basilica, a large Catholic church which sits near the intersection of Avenue de la Paix and Avenue de France. It was constructed during the late colonial era with brick walls and a green tiled roof, and was consecrated in 1949. Directly across the roundabout from the basilica is the Maison du Peuple, the seat of local government. The center of the neighborhood is dominated by a market, one of Brazzaville's largest. Since the 1990s Poto-Poto, like most other neighborhoods of Brazzaville, has been home to numerous small but boisterous evangelical churches of all denominations. There are also at least six mosques, including the Masjid al-Sunna (or Sunni Mosque) on Rue Bacongo, which is the largest mosque in Congo and holds nearly 2000 worshippers; its construction was entirely financed by members of Brazzaville's West African immigrant population. Poto-Poto's denizens may also partake of various varieties of nightlife in the neighborhood's famous bars and clubs, including Chez Faignond which was one of the first Congolese-owned nightspots, established in 1948. The Ecole de Peinture de Poto-Poto (Poto-Poto School of Painting), though technically located in Moungali, is a renowned artistic centre which has produced numerous artists with a distinctive visual style.

== Sources ==
- Balandier, Georges. (1985) Sociologie des Brazzavilles Noires. 2nd edition. Paris: Presses de la Fondation Nationale des Sciences Politiques.
- Martin, Phyllis M. (1995) Leisure and Society in Colonial Brazzaville. New York: Cambridge University Press.
