= Tshitenge Lubabu =

Congolese journalist (1955–2021)

- Born: Muitubile K. Tshitenge Lubabu; 1955
- Died: 2 November 2021 (aged 66)
- Occupation: Journalist

Muitubile K. Tshitenge Lubabu (1955 – 2 November 2021) was a Congolese journalist and writer.

== Biography ==
An African journalist and writer, Lubabu wrote various biographies of famous people from the continent. He collaborated with the weekly news magazine Jeune Afrique. He also worked as an audiovisual consultant for African affairs.

Lubabu died on 2 November 2021 at the age of 66.

== Works ==
- Césaire et nous : une rencontre entre l'Afrique et les Amériques au XXIe siècle (2003)
- Léopold Sédar Senghor : le poète-président du Sénégal (2005)
- Gabon : Bongo face au changement (2006)
- Le Tchad et son potentiel économique (2009)
- Le Congo et son potentiel économique (2009)
- Le Tchad (2010)
- Adolphe Muzito "Non, la RD Congo n'est pas un pays riche!"
