= African Jazz Mokili Mobimba =

Song by Le Grand Kallé et l'African Jazz
- Language: Lingala
- Released: 1961; 65 years ago
- Recorded: 1961; 65 years ago
- Genre: African rumba
- Length: 5:09
- Songwriter: Mwamba Mongala

African Jazz Mokili Mobimba (often referred to as Africa Mokili Mobimba or Afrika Mokili Mobimba) was a popular song written in the Congolese rumba style by Charles Mwamba Déchaud and performed by Joseph Kabasele's band, African Jazz.

== History ==
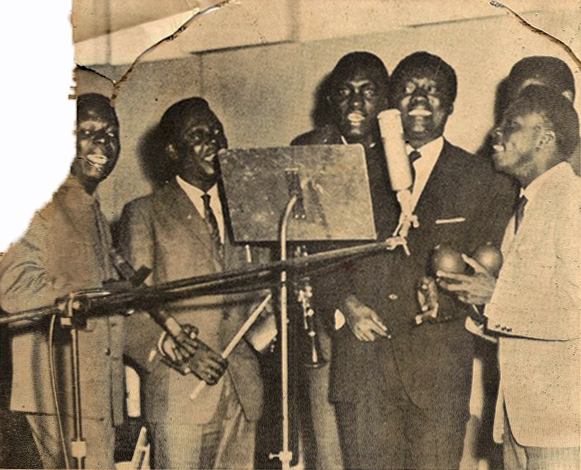
African Jazz in a recording studio in 1961

Beginning in June 1961, the popular Congolese band African Jazz —led by Joseph Kabasele— made a series of recordings in Brussels, Belgium. One of their new songs was "African Jazz Mokili Mobimba" (meaning "African Jazz all over the world"), written by guitarist Mwamba "Déchaud" Mongala in the Congolese rumba style. It was released later that year. It was a pastiche of two Latin American songs. The lyrics caution against excessive travel abroad. The song also references all of the performing musicians as well as several Congolese cities and African countries (a common way of expressing praise at the time). At just over five minutes in length, it was one of the first African recordings to make use of the larger 45 rpm records then only recently available in the continent.

African Jazz Mokili Mobimba went on to become a hit of the early 1960s. It became particularly popular in Kenyan dance clubs in 1965. It is often considered to be one of African Jazz's most memorable songs, though by the early 2000s it was commonly referred to as simply "Africa Mokili Mobimba".

== Cover versions ==
In 1994 the song was covered by ex-OK Jazz musician Sam Mangwana and the Fania All-Stars for the former's album, entitled Rumba Music. African Jazz vocalist Tabu Ley Rochereau later recorded "African Jazz Mokili Mobimba" as a solo artist to be the leading track on his 1996 live album Africa Worldwide. Ex-OK Jazz guitarist Papa Noël Nedule frequently featured Mangwana and Rochereau in his covers of the song.
