= Soubry (company) =

Belgian food company

- Type: Public
- Industry: Food processing
- Founded: 1921
- Founder: Joseph Soubry
- Headquarters: Roeselare, Belgium
- Key people: Michel Soubry (CEO)
- Products: Pasta
- Revenue: €130 million (2018)
- Number of employees: 400
- Website: soubry.be

Soubry is a Belgian food processing company founded in 1921 by Joseph Soubry. It is known for its production of pasta and is the market leader in Belgium. The company is headquartered in Roeselare.

== History ==
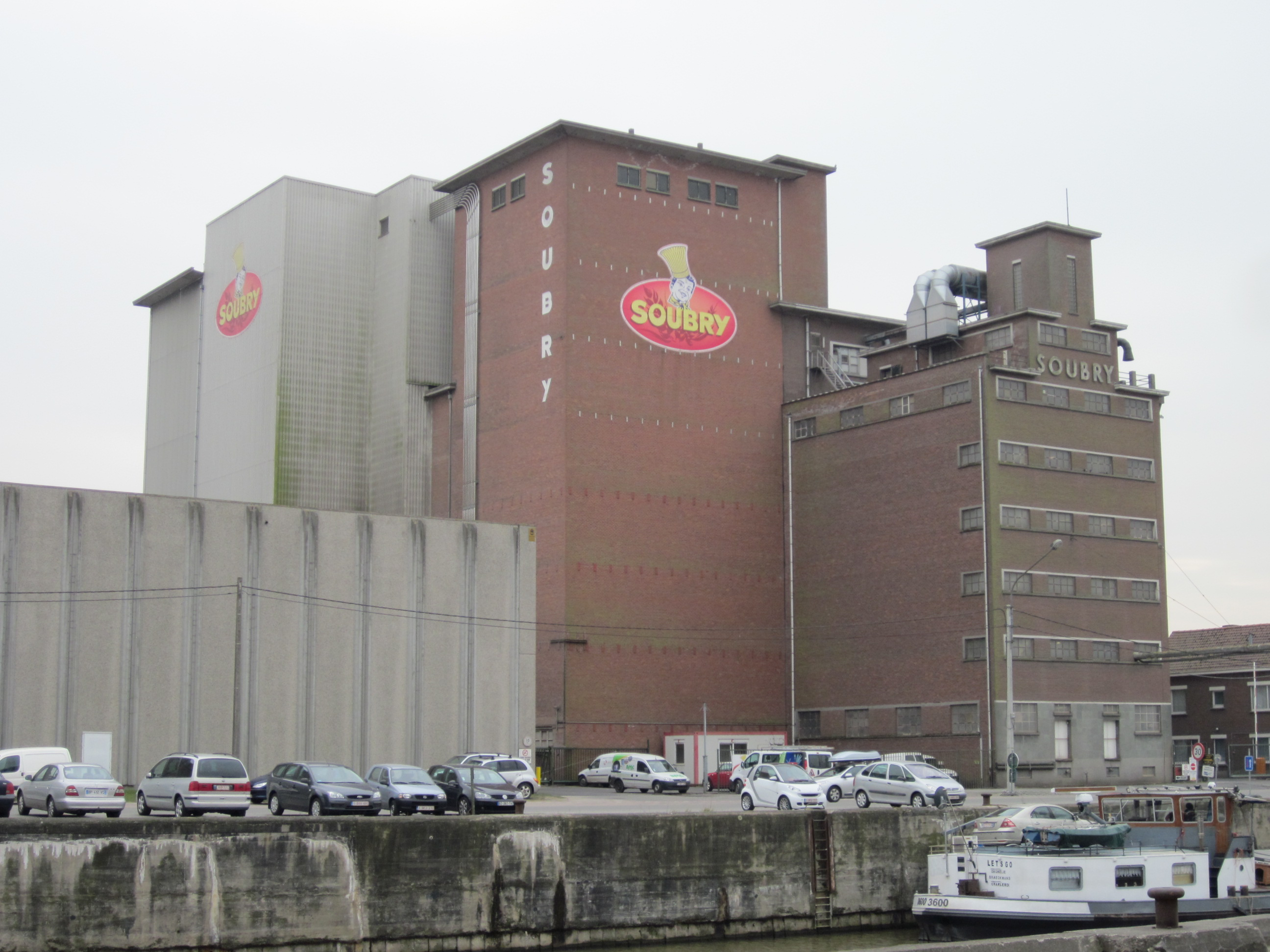
Soubry factory in Roeselare

Before World War I, Joseph Soubry's factory produced chicory and linseed oil. After the war, with his factory completely destroyed, he initially started producing vermicelli and later shifted to the production of pasta due to the saturated Belgian vermicelli market. In the 1930s, the company expanded and made various investments, including the construction of its own semolina mill. After World War II, they established a pasta production line, followed by the construction of their own flour mill a few years later. The company continued to diversify its product range, including producing biscuits, noodles, and instant cooking pasta. By 2001, the company had 350 employees, generated a turnover of 2.8 billion Belgian francs, more than half of which came from exports, and became the market leader in pasta in Belgium following the bankruptcy of Anco.

In 2018, Soubry reported a revenue of €130 million and employed 400 people. It remained the market leader in Belgium.

== See also ==
- Panzani
- Barilla
