= Palabala =

Village in the Democratic Republic of the Congo

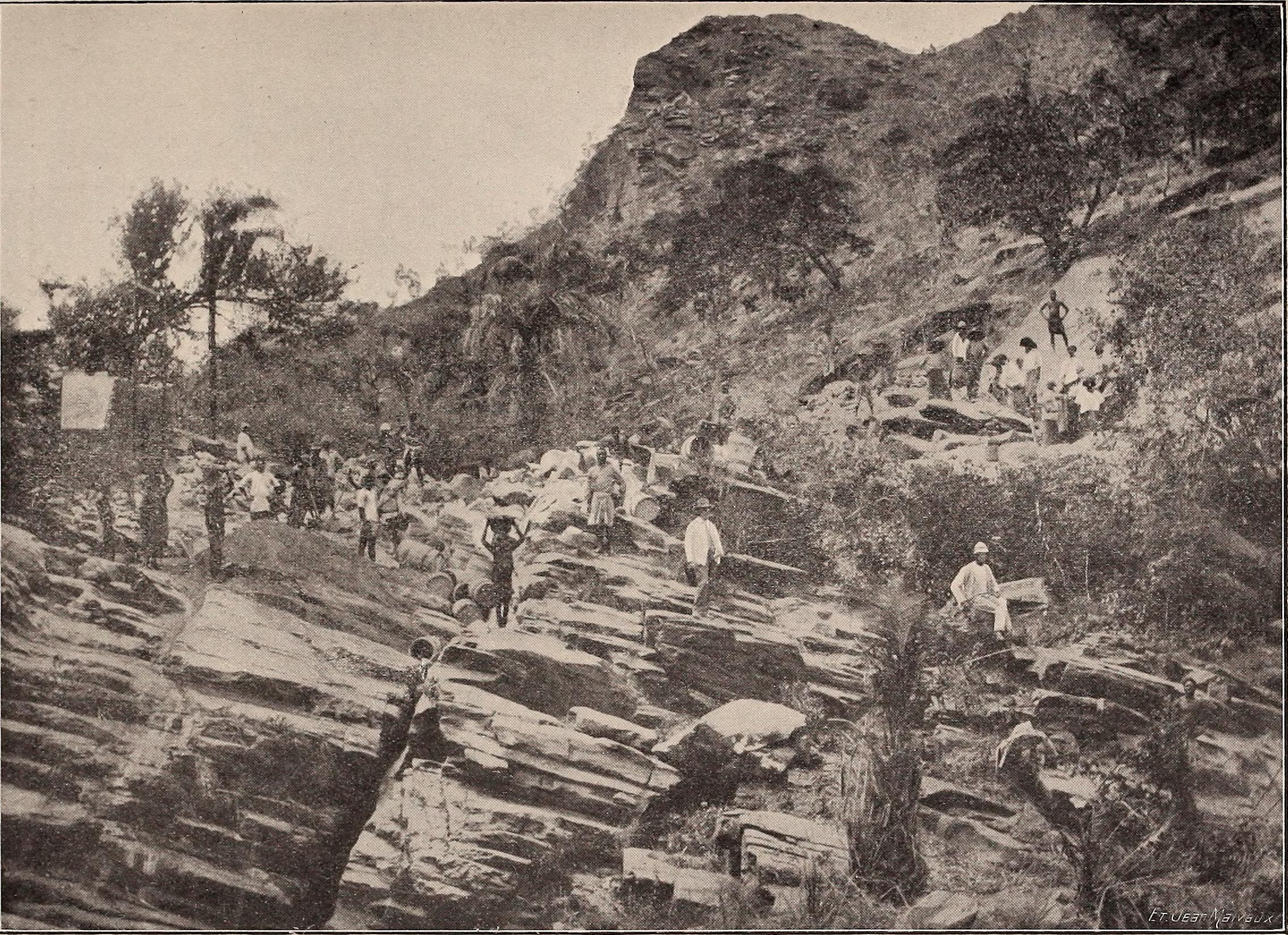
Photo from 1907 when the Compagnie du Chemin de Fer du Congo was being constructed

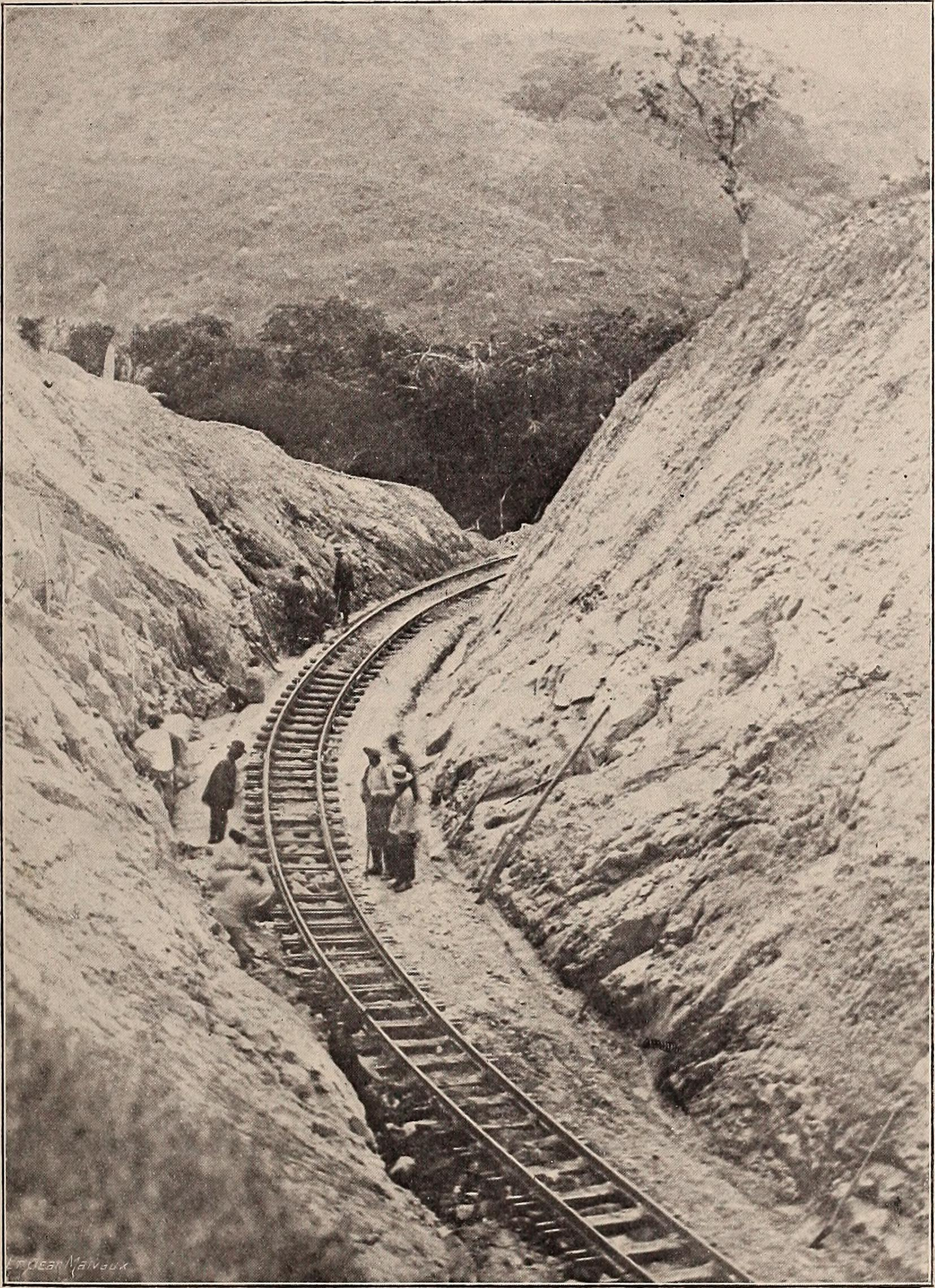

Palabala is a village in the Democratic Republic of the Congo. It is mentioned in The River Congo from its mouth to Bólobó; with a general description of the natural history and anthropology of its western basin (1895) by Sir Harry Hamilton Johnston. It was a stop on the Compagnie du Chemin de Fer du Congo railway. Several American missionaries served there.

According to Johnston it is south of Vivi and near the Lualaba River. He described it as "on the crest of a great hill, 1600 feet high" and described a missionary presence with inhabitants greeting him with "morning".

Many Baptist missionaries were stationed there in the late 19th century.

A plaque in the area commemorates the railway connecting Matadi to Stanley-Pool. An orphan named "Quangu" from Palabala was given the name Estey Carolina and was sent so Estey Seminary in the United States. Missionary Ezra Cole Boone died in Palabala.
