= African Fiesta =

Congolese rumba band

L'Orchestra African Fiesta, often known simply as African Fiesta, was a Congolese rumba band started by Tabu Ley Rochereau and Dr. Nico Kasanda in 1963.

== History ==
Tabu Ley and Dr. Nico were originally members of the seminal band Grand Kalle et l'African Jazz. They left African Jazz and started their own group, African Fiesta, with which they helped elevate the genre of African rumba into the genre now known as Soukous.

Tension between Tabu Ley and Dr. Nico led to a split in 1965, with Tabu Ley renaming the band African Fiesta National and Dr. Nico forming African Fiesta Sukisa. Dr. Nico withdrew from the music scene in the mid-1970s.

Tabu Ley and African Fiesta National continued to dominate the Congolese musical scene. By 1970, their records routinely sold in the millions. African Fiesta National served as a breeding ground for such future African music stars.

In 1970, Tabu Ley formed Orchestre Afrisa International, Afrisa being a combination of Africa and Éditions Isa, his Record label. not including Sam Mangwana who amongst originals of TPOK jazz. Bred by Franco alongside Josky Londa, Henri Bowane, Jean Essous amongst many with different ages. Madilu system and Sam Mangwana despite their age difference used to respect one another a lot not to mention differences that would always appear but equivocally Madilu was a junior despite Sir Sam still being alive.

== Discography ==
Contributing artist

- The Rough Guide to Congo Gold (2008, World Music Network)
- Authenticité volume 1
