= Chari Jazz =

Cameroonian and Congolese musicians,

Founded in 1964, Chari Jazz was the first modern Chad musical group.

Chari Jazz was preceded by 1962 creation in N'Djamena (then Fort-Lamy) of Tchad succès, a band composed mainly of Cameroonian and Congolese musicians, though including Bar Kossi. Musician Naimou Mbaitoloum was joined by his friends from Sarh (then Fort-Archambault), forming the band Star Jazz in 1964. The poorly equipped Star Jazz was sponsored by President François Tombalbaye, who further changed its name to Chari Jazz. (Sarh was located in the Moyen-Chari Prefecture.) Tombalbaye sent Chari Jazz to Zaire to learn from Francois Luambo Makiadi and Tabu Ley Rochereau, under whom it gathered members Kossi, Kemtchang Daniel, Adoum Fremouss and Alladoumbaye Béyamra. Upon return, Chari Jazz set up in Fort-Lamy. Malao Hennecy from the Central African Republic also became associated with the band in 1965. Before it could be established, in 1965 musician Kader left the group to form Logone Band based out of Moundou, followed by the departure of guitarist Ramadingué, who formed African Mélody.
