= Loningisa =

- Founded: 1950
- Founder: Athanase Papadimitriou; Basile Papadimitriou
- Country of origin: Democratic Republic of the Congo

Loningisa was a studio and record label based in Kinshasa in the Democratic Republic of the Congo (then known as Zaire). Loningisa was made famous by the emergence of the African rumba band OK Jazz, whose music became popular, and a big influence on African and Congolese popular music.

OK Jazz included Francois Luambo Makiadi who emerged as Zaire's first true pop-music star, particularly his guitar playing abilities. Franco and all other members of OK Jazz were tutored and trained at the Loningisa studios. The group formed via collective participation at Loningisa's studios as players in sessions and the house band titled 'Bana Loningisa' (Loningisa Boys).

Loningisa was founded by Congolese Greek brothers Athanase and Basile Papadimitriou in 1950. In 1974, Mobutu ordered the company be confiscated and turned over to a native Congolese owner as part of his Zairianisation program. Zairianisation was not favorable for the company, and the Mobutu regime turned the company back over to its Greek owners in 1976.

== See also ==
- List of record labels
