= Radio Congo Belge =

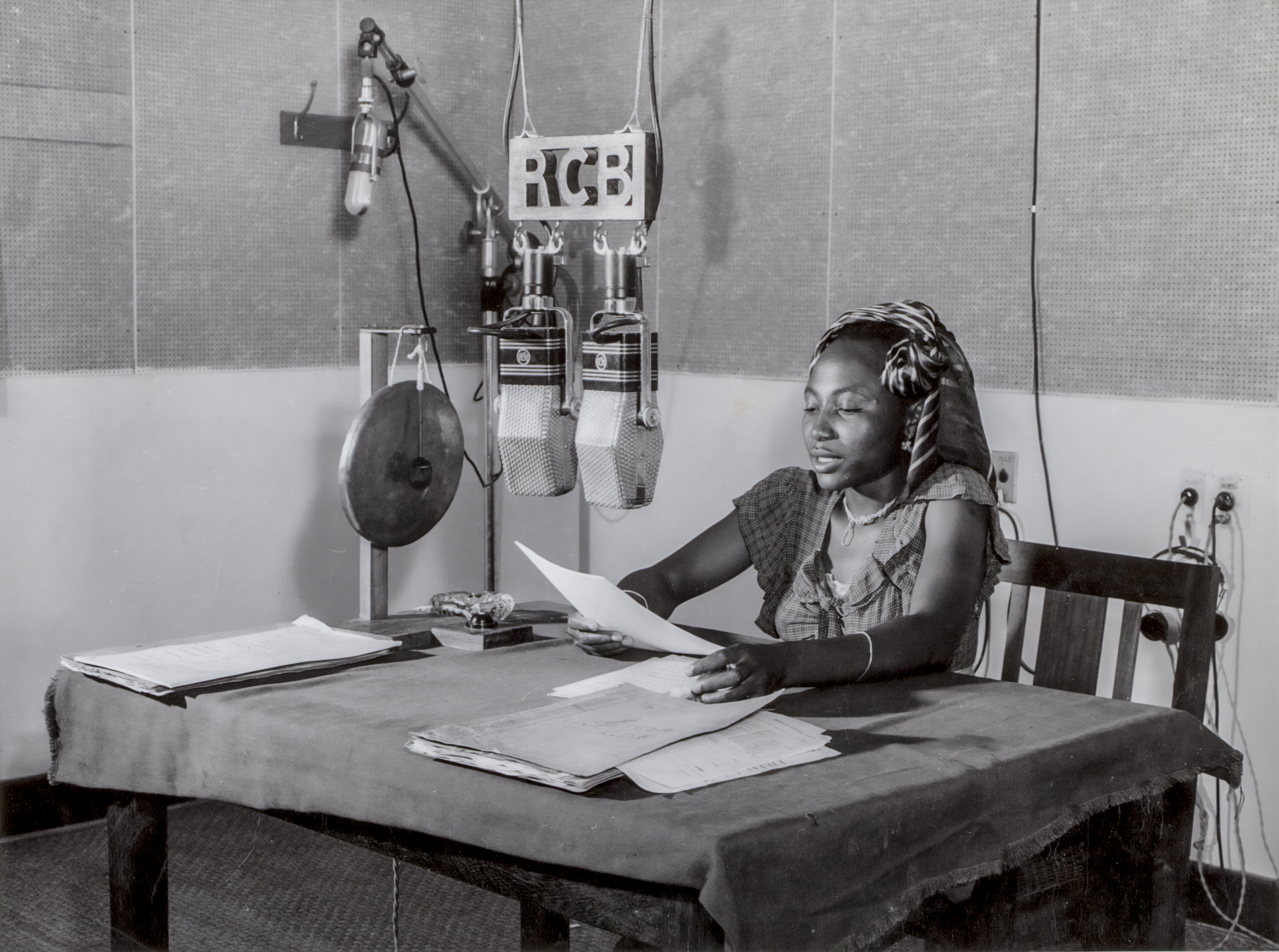
Pauline Lisanga, the first Congolese presenter for Radio Congo Belge in an undated photograph taken by Inforcongo Carlo Lamote.

Radio Congo Belge (French, "Belgian Congo Radio") was a radio broadcaster in the Belgian Congo (the modern Democratic Republic of the Congo) which played an important role in the early development and popularisation of Congolese rumba music across Africa in the aftermath of World War II.

Radio Congo Belge was established in Léopoldville (modern-day Kinshasa) as a means of broadcasting news and propaganda to the white population of the Congo and German-occupied Belgium in World War II. It broadcast for the first time on 1 October 1940. However, this role was assumed by Radiodiffusion nationale belge (RNB) in May 1943 which also broadcast from Léopoldville and Radio Congo Belge became more focused on broadcasting within the colony. It played an important role in providing Congolese musicians with access to foreign musical influences. It was particularly influential in introducing Afro-Cuban music into the Congo through groups such as Septeto Habanero and Trio Matamoros.

According to historian Gary Stewart, Radio Congo Belge, together with Radio Brazzaville and Congolia, "contributed to the critical mix of music taking shape on the banks of the Congo River". The station has also been described as an "important promotional outlet for local music" which allowed Congolese bands and recording studios to emerge.

After the independence of Congo-Léopoldville in 1960, the station was renamed Radiodiffusion Congolaise ("Congolese Radio Broadcasting"). Other radio services of the period included OTC and Radio Léopoldville.

== Bibliography ==
- Stewart, Gary (2000). Rumba on the River: A History of the Popular Music of the two Congos (Paperback ed.). New York: Verso. ISBN 978-1859843680.
- Impey, Angela (2008). "Popular Music in Africa". In Stone, Ruth M. (ed.). The Garland Handbook of African Music (2nd ed.). New York: Routledge. ISBN 978-0415961028.
