= Jean Serge Essous =

Jean Serge Essous (1935 in Mossendjo – November 25, 2009, in Brazzaville) was a Congolese saxophonist, clarinetist, and cofounder of the Afrika Team in Paris, Bantous de la Capital in Brazzaville, OK Jazz and Orchestre Rock a Mambo. On 11 October 2006, UNESCO Director-General Koïchiro Matsuura designated him a UNESCO Artist for Peace.
