= Rock-a-Mambo =

African band

Orchestre Rock-a-Mambo was a Congolese rumba band from Brazzaville of the 1950s. It was a studio band of the Esengo music studio.

It was reconstituted in 1963 under former member Philippe "Rossignol" Lando. This version, which lasted until the 1970s, was a launching pad for young musicians including Bopol, Wuta Mayi, Camille "Checain" Lola, and Henriette Borauzima.

The band often merged with the musicians from the African Jazz band and sometimes produced recordings under the title ""African Rock".

The band name is a pun with the Kongolese word rocamambu "the one who looks for problems". In a Kongolese folk tale, Rocamambu is a kind of prodigal son, who runs from home and comes back rich.

== Discography ==
Rock-a-Mambo music appears on the following albums and compilations.

- AFRICAN RETRO vol. 5 Pathé Marconi - EMI 2 C064-15962
- AFRICAN RETRO Vol 6 Pathé Marconi - EMI 2 C064-15978
- AFRICAN MEMORIES Pathé Marconi - EMI 2C062-15136; also C062-15810

=== EPs ===
- Orchestre Rock-A-Mambo [Columbia ESRF 1460; also ESDF1321]
- Rossignol et l'Orchestre Rock 'A Mambo [Columbia ESRF 1793; also ESDF 1321]
- Orchestre Rock-A-Mambo[ESRF 1415; also ESDF 1343]
- Orchestre Rock-A-Mambo volume 2, ESDF 1372
- Nino et l'Orchestre Rock-A-Mambo volume 3 [Columbia ESDF 1380]
- GROUPES CHOC DES ANNEES 50s ESDF 1372
- CONGO LATINO Columbia ESDF 1401
- ORCHESTRE ROCK-A-MAMBO NO 4 (Columbia ESDF 1403; orig: Esengo)

=== Singles ===
A large number of singles were recorded by the Esengo studio.
