= Opika =

Congolese record label

- Founded: 1949
- Founder: Gabriel Moussa Benetar and Joseph Benetar
- Status: Defunct
- Genre: African music
- Country of origin: Belgian Congo (now Democratic Republic of the Congo)
- Location: Léopoldville (now Kinshasa)

Opika was an early record label in the Congo, which recorded and promoted African pop, guitar, and rumba - not only from the Congo, but from Cameroon and Ghana as well. The label also recognized the value of ethnographic recordings, which were featured on a number of their releases. Started by brothers Gabriel Moussa Benetar and Joseph Benetar, from the Greek island of Rhodes, Opika was a prodigious producer of 78 rpm shellac recordings through the late 1950s. The company was initially called "Kina," but the name was subsequently changed to “Opika” from a phrase in Lingala, “opika pende” meaning “stand firm”. The name Opika was chosen in some sense as a challenge to the reigning and monolithic recording house Ngoma that this new recording company was a force to be reckoned with. The label was the first to sign Joseph Kabaselle who, along with other Opika session players Nico and Déchaud formed the band African Jazz, which contributed heavily to the evolving Latin-style Congolese rumba. The label also gave rise to the careers of many early rumba stars in the Congo, such as Jhimmy and Paul Mwanga.

== See also ==
- List of record labels
