= Nico Kasanda =

Congolese musician (1939–1985)

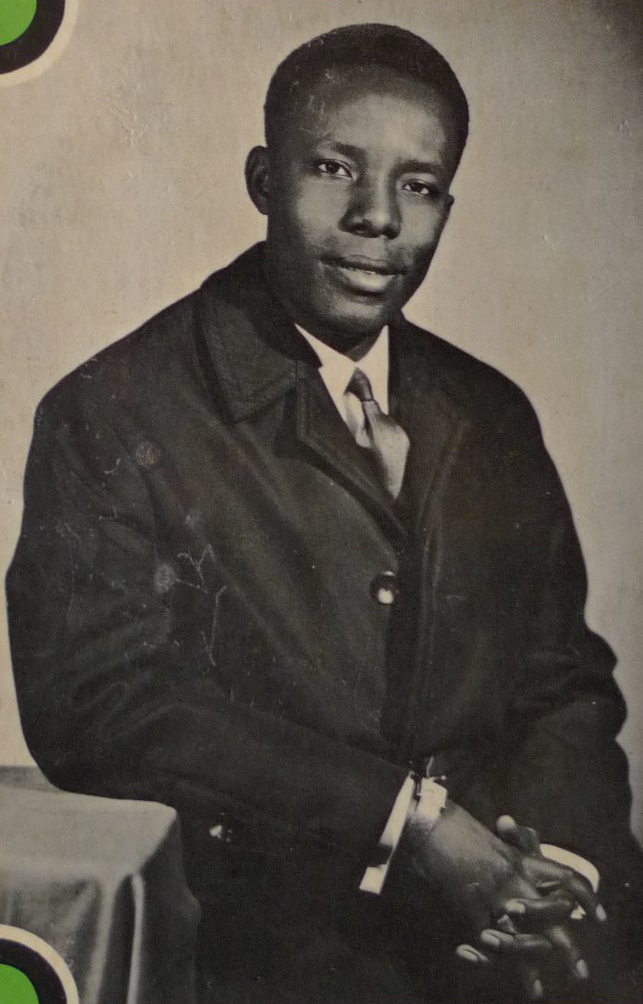
- Kasanda in the 1960s

Background information
- Also known as: Docteur Nico
- Born: Nicolas Kasanda wa Mikalay; 7 July 1939; Mikalayi, Belgian Congo
- Died: 22 September 1985 (aged 46) Brussels, Belgium
- Genres: Congolese rumba and Soukous
- Instrument: Guitar
- Years active: 1957 – c. 1975

Nicolas Kasanda wa Mikalay (7 July 1939 – 22 September 1985), popularly known as Docteur Nico, was a Congolese guitarist and composer. One of the pioneers of Congolese music, he graduated in 1957 as a technical teacher, but inspired by his musical family, he took up the guitar and in time became a virtuoso soloist.

== Musical career ==
At the age of 14, Kasanda started playing with the group Grand Kalle et l'African Jazz, led by Joseph "Grand Kalle" Kabasele. He became an influential guitarist (Jimi Hendrix visited him while on tour in Paris), and the originator of the ubiquitous Congolese finger-picked guitar style, acquiring the nickname "Dr. Nico". African Jazz split up in 1963 when he and singer Tabu Ley Rochereau left to form L'Orchestra African Fiesta, which became one of the most popular bands in Africa.

In 1970 Kasanda wrote an arrangement of the Luba folk song Kamulangu, recorded it with his band, Orchestre African Fiesta Sukisa, and released it to much success in Kinshasa.

He withdrew from the music scene in the mid-1970s following the collapse of his Belgian record label, making a few final recordings in Togo and working live with Zairean singer Abeti Masikini, before dying in a hospital in Brussels, Belgium in 1985.

== Discography ==
Contributing artist

- The Rough Guide to Congo Gold (2008, World Music Network)

== Works cited ==
- Mpisi, Jean (2003). Tabu Ley "Rochereau": innovateur de la musique africaine (in French). L'Harmattan. ISBN 9782747557351.
- Mukala, Kadima Nzuji; Malonga, Alpha Noël (2004). Itinéraires et convergences des musiques traditionnelles et modernes d'Afrique (in French). Festival Panafricain de Musique. ISBN 9782747575843.
