= Papa Noël Nedule =

Congolese musician (1940–2024)

- Also known as: Papa Noël
- Born: Antoine Nedule Monswet; 29 December 1940; Léopoldville, Belgian Congo (modern-day Kinshasa, Democratic Republic of the Congo)
- Died: 11 November 2024 (aged 83) Draveil, Essonne, Île-de-France
- Genres: African rumba; soukous; salsa
- Occupations: Guitarist; singer-songwriter; bandleader
- Instruments: Guitar vocals
- Years active: 1950s–2024
- Labels: Ngoma; CEFA; Fonior; Editions Obam; Le Monde des Artistes; IAD (Industrie Africaine Du Disque); Production Les Mampoko's; Stern's Africa; Yard High; Tumi Music; Buda Musique
- Formerly of: Jazz Mango; Rock-a-Mambo; Maquina Loca; Les Bantous de la Capitale; African Jazz; Orchestre Cobantou; Orchestre Bamboula; TPOK Jazz
- Spouse: Danielle "Dadie" Nedule Monswet
- Children: 7

Antoine Nedule Monswet (29 December 1940 – 11 November 2024), known professionally as Papa Noël Nedule or simply Papa Noël, was a Congolese rumba guitarist, singer-songwriter, and bandleader. A seminal figure in Congolese and African popular music, he is widely regarded as one of the greatest Congolese solo guitarists. Associated with the "African Jazz School" of Congolese rumba, alongside figures such as Emmanuel Antoine Tshilumba wa Baloji (Tino Baroza) and Nico Kasanda, Papa Noël helped shape the early rhythmic and stylistic foundations of the genre. His guitar style, described by cultural historian Richard M. Shain as evoking "a rippling sound reminiscent of the Congolese thumb piano likembe", contributed to shaping the sound of modern Congolese rumba.

Papa Noël was born in Léopoldville, in what was then the Belgian Congo (now Kinshasa in the Democratic Republic of the Congo). He began his music career in the late 1950s and first performed with Léon Bukasa's backing band Jazz Mango in 1957. He then joined several influential bands, including Rock-a-Mambo (1958), Maquina Loca (1959–1960), Les Bantous de la Capitale (1961–1963), African Jazz (1964), Orchestre Cobantou (1965), Orchestre Bamboula (1967), and later TPOK Jazz in 1978. In 1989, he settled permanently in France.

In 1973, the government of Zaire commissioned him to produce the Anthologie de la Musique Zaïroise Moderne, Volumes 1 and 2, which he brought together pioneering artists such as Antoine Wendo Kolosoy, Camille Feruzi, Manuel d'Oliveira, Lucie Elenga, Léon Bukasa, and Adou Elenga to record and preserve key works from the golden era of Congolese music (1950–1958). That same year, Nedule was awarded the National Prize for Merit in Culture and the Arts (Prix national de mérite de la culture et des arts), an honor he received again in 2025, conferred by the Congolese National Assembly on behalf of President Joseph Kabila.

== Life and career ==
=== 1940–1956: Early life and career beginnings ===
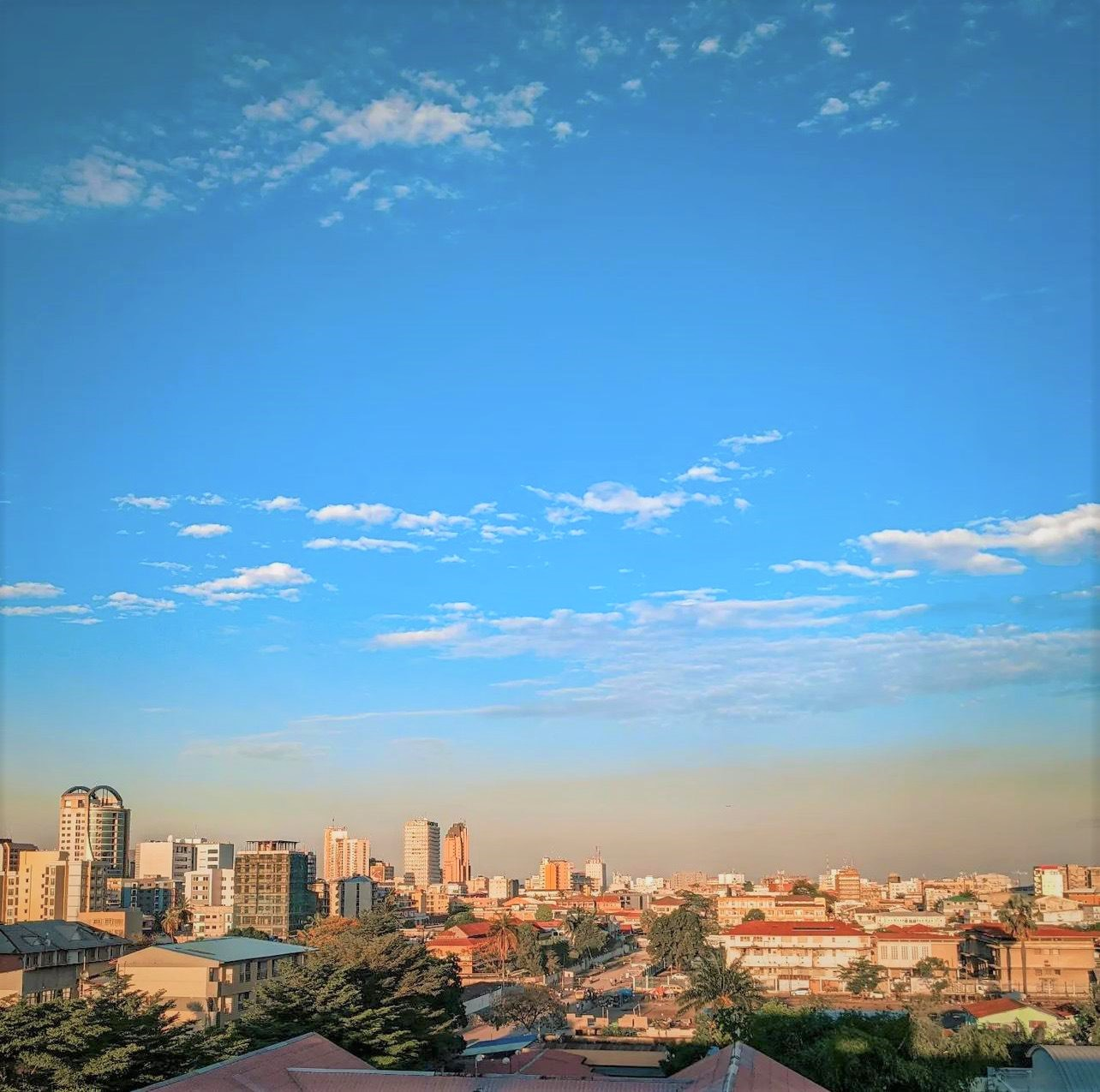
Kinshasa, formerly known as Léopoldville, was the birthplace of Papa Noël and served as the capital of the Belgian Congo during the colonial era.

Antoine Nedule Monswet was born on 29 December 1940 in Léopoldville, then part of the Belgian Congo (later known as the Republic of the Congo, Zaire, and today the Democratic Republic of the Congo), to a father from Republic of the Congo and a mother from Democratic Republic of the Congo. Though it was widely believed that his moniker "Noël" was derived from his birth during the festive Christmas period, Papa Noël clarified in a 2024 interview with the Daily Nation that his stage name had no connection to Christmas. Instead, it was bestowed upon him by his mentor, Léon Bukasa, who reversed the spelling of his own name "Léon" to create "Noël" and added "Papa" in accordance with a cultural tradition from Nedule's maternal ethnic group, wherein the firstborn son is affectionately referred to by that title.

Papa Noël grew up under the sole care of his mother. At the age of 15 in 1956, Papa Noël enrolled at Collège Sainte-Anne (now Collège Saint-Joseph) in the Kalina district (today Gombe) of Léopoldville, then the only primary school for native Congolese in the city. There, he began developing his musical talents, gaining local fame as "the little Django Reinhardt". Although initially autodidactic in his approach to the guitar, he later pursued formal instruction in vocal techniques and musical theory, including the reading and composition of musical notation. Among the musicians who inspired him were Paul Ebengo Dewayon, Antoine Wendo Kolosoy, Le Grand Kallé, Henri Bowane, Jean Bosco Mwenda, Zacharie Elenga, Manuel d'Oliveira, and Emmanuel Antoine Tshilumba wa Baloji (Tino Baroza). Papa Noël credited Zacharie Elenga's Hawaiian guitar style, alongside the works of François Bosele and Belgian guitarist Bill Alexandre, with influencing his early interest in guitar solos.

=== 1957–1960: Léon Bukasa, Rock-a-Mambo, Maquina Loca, and Les Bantous de la Capitale ===
In 1957, while strumming his guitar outside his family home, he seized the attention of Léon Bukasa who was visiting relatives nearby. Impressed by his skill, Bukasa invited him to participate in a recording session. Papa Noël eagerly accepted the offer and accompanied Bukasa to the Ngoma studio, where he was introduced to Mr. Pileas, the studio's organist, sound engineer, and artistic director. Recording practices at the time required all musicians to perform live around a single microphone, meaning that any errors would require a complete retake. On his initial attempt, Papa Noël, gripped by nerves and lacking studio experience, faltered. However, buoyed by Bukasa's encouragement, he succeeded on the second take, recording his inaugural guitar solo on the track "Clara Badimuene". At the time, the Belgian Congo didn't have a local pressing industry, so records were produced in Europe. When the record eventually arrived two months later, Papa Noël's guitar performance garnered considerable attention. The success of "Clara Badimuene" earned him a lucrative payment from Ngoma, which subsequently arranged a major promotional tour in support of Bukasa's recordings. As a member of Bukasa's backing band Jazz Mango, which included bass, saxophone, trumpet, and his own guitar, Papa Noël gained substantial recognition, particularly for his contributions to Bukasa's hit "Simplice Wa Bolingo", where he accompanied saxophonist Albino Kalombo. During this period, Rock-a-Mambo, which had recently returned from a transcontinental tour across Africa, found itself without a lead guitarist following Tino Baroza's decision to remain in Cameroon. Jean Serge Essous, the bandleader, approached Papa Noël and invited him to join Rock-a-Mambo. Papa Noël joined the band in 1958, where he grew musically alongside Nino Malapet and Essous himself. His exceptional command of melodic phrasing and syncopated rhythms made him a standout soloist. This is evident in recordings like "Bakoule Bidama" (Liengo), "Nabanzi Yo", "Damoni Charlotte" (Papa Noël), "Abra La Puerta" (Essous), "Oyé Jacky" (Jacky), "Iyele", "Comité Rock-à-Mambo", "Annie Michou", "Yamare", and "Bidama Ya Rocka" (Nino)—which showcased his flair for infusing Congolese rumba with elements of rock. He remained with Rock-a-Mambo until its dissolution in August 1959, which was precipitated by political pressure that compelled Brazzaville-based members of the group to return to Congo-Brazzaville. Under duress from the colonial authorities, Congolese musicians hailing from Brazzaville, including Nino Malapet, Jean Serge Essous, and Saturnin Pandi, were compelled to return to their homeland. As a result, Rock-a-Mambo disbanded, and the displaced musicians subsequently regrouped in Brazzaville to form the influential band Les Bantous de la Capitale.

Following Rock-a-Mambo's disintegration, Papa Noël joined the band of singer Guy Léon Fylla, Maquina Loka, in Libreville. During his tenure from 1959 to 1960, he helped define a distinct rhythmic style that became emblematic of the band's sound, particularly on recordings such as "Espérencia", "Mwana Gabon", "Bemba", and "Souvenir Ya Chérie". Maquina Loka ultimately disbanded following Fylla's relocation to France and the untimely deaths of instrumentalists Louison Loso and Bernard Tchebo, events that coincided with Gabon's attainment of independence in August 1960. Papa Noël returned to Léopoldville via Pointe-Noire and, in early 1961, passed through Brazzaville, where he was solicited by Jean Serge Essous to join the newly founded Les Bantous de la Capitale. His inclusion in the band, alongside accompanist Jacques Mambau, came at a critical time when the band sought to revitalize its guitar section. Papa Noël's refined technique, harmonic innovation, and rhythmic inventiveness played a foundational role in shaping the band's distinct identity. Unlike the African Jazz and OK Jazz schools, Les Bantous de la Capitale emphasized a blend of brass arrangements and intricate guitar-driven rhythmic foundation, a stylistic idiom that would later be canonized as the "Bantu School".

=== 1962–1964: First European excursion and African Jazz ===
In the latter part of 1962, Roger Izeidi, a prominent member of African Jazz and artistic director of the CEFA (Compagnie d'Énregistrements Folkloriques Africains) label, arranged the debut European trip of Les Bantous de la Capitale. The band spent nearly a month recording at the Fonior studio in Brussels, one of the most advanced recording facilities they had encountered to date. Each member contributed original compositions, and over the course of the sessions, the group recorded a total of 102 tracks, including several that would become major hits. It was during these sessions that the band formally adopted the name Les Bantous de la Capitale, inspired spontaneously when Célestin Kouka sang the phrase during a recording to complete a final track. The introduction to Fonior's advanced recording technologies, which enabled the precise editing of individual parts without the need to re-record entire compositions, marked a pivotal moment in Papa Noël's understanding of studio production. During the Brussels sessions, he earned the nickname "Jhonny Noël", a reference to his acrobatic stage movements that echoed the style of Johnny Hallyday. This moniker marked the emergence of the "Ritmo Bantou" style, a sound that would become emblematic of Les Bantous de la Capitale. Notable songs such as "Naleli Bebe", "Bang'o Mboka" (Papa Noël), "Rosalie Na Nino", "Oïga Mambo", "Fuego de Passion" (Nino), "Camarade Mabe", "Tokumisa Congo", "Aiglon Cara" (Essous), "Albert Akeyi", "Gary Mobali Ya Tembe" (Kouka), Nakobanza Chérie, and "Woso" (Bukasa Jojo), helped define this genre. Following their return to Brazzaville, Les Bantous de la Capitale achieved significant success on both sides of the Congo River. Their performances in 1963, particularly their Saturday night shows, attracted large crowds. At the time, Papa Noël, aged 22, was rapidly emerging as a central figure in the Congolese rumba scene. Meanwhile, African Jazz, founded by Joseph Kabasele (also known as Le Grand Kallé or Kalle Jeff), known for its historic hit "Indépendance Cha-Cha", had suffered a substantial rift. Key members, such as Tabu Ley Rochereau, Nico Kasanda, and Roger Izeidi, had parted ways to form African Fiesta. Faced with the inability to rely on African Jazz for entertainment at his wedding, Kabasele enlisted Les Bantous de la Capitale for the occasion. However, following their performance at the Zoological Garden in Léopoldville, rumors circulated suggesting that Papa Noël was contemplating a departure from Les Bantous de la Capitale to join African Jazz. In 1964, disturbed by the rumors and still inexperienced in handling public scrutiny, Papa Noël decided to leave Les Bantous de la Capitale behind. He relocated to Léopoldville, where he was soon approached by Kabasele, and accompanied him to Bukavu in the eastern Belgian Congo. There, they encountered Jean "Jeannot" Bombenga, a former African Jazz singer struggling to sustain his new group, Vox Africa. Kabasele and Bombenga subsequently consolidated their efforts, with Papa Noël integrating into the reformed African Jazz.

=== 1964–1977: from attempts at independence to Anthologie de la Musique Zaïroise Moderne ===
Following his brief tenure with Joseph Kabasele and African Jazz, which included a tour across Congo-Léopoldville and Europe (with performances in Brussels, Munich, and Paris), Papa Noël sought to establish greater independence in his musical career. In 1965, he joined the Cobantou orchestra, a group composed of musicians from Les Bantous de la Capitale and Dewayon's Congo Jazz. In 1967, Papa Noël reunited with former collaborators Jean "Jeannot" Bombenga, Ntesa Dalienst, and Sam Mangwana in the formation of the orchestra Vox Africa. Although this collaboration was short-lived, lasting only a few months, it laid the foundation for future partnerships, particularly within the influential TPOK Jazz.

In 1968, Papa Noël founded his own orchestra, Bamboula, which became a launching pad for several future figures of Congolese music, including Pépé Kallé, Madilu System, Bozi Boziana, and Wuta Mayi. That same year, Bamboula competed in a national selection event to represent Congo-Kinshasa at the Festival panafricain d'Alger 1969. After a highly competitive audition process, Bamboula was selected. At the festival, Papa Noël and Bamboula performed alongside Miriam Makeba, Stokely Carmichael, and Hugh Masekela. The festival also featured collaborative jam sessions among participating artists. Despite the success and prestige of the Algiers performance, Bamboula disbanded shortly afterward, leaving Papa Noël to continue his career independently. In 1973, the government of Zaire commissioned him to produce the Anthologie de la Musique Zaïroise Moderne, Volumes 1 and 2, during which he gathered influential Congolese rumba pioneers such as Antoine Wendo Kolosoy, Camille Feruzi, Manuel d'Oliveira, Lucie Elenga, Léon Bukasa, and Adou Elenga to record and safeguard masterpieces from the golden age of Congolese music (1950–1958). That year, Nedule received the National Prize for Merit in Culture and the Arts (Prix national de mérite de la culture et des arts). By that time, he was already esteemed for his guitar techniques, songwriting prowess, and ability to integrate virtuosity into ensemble performances. Although his attempts to establish a permanent orchestra had not succeeded, Papa Noël's abilities ensured he remained a sought-after collaborator among leading Congolese musical collectives.

=== 1977–1989: TPOK Jazz ===
In 1978, he joined TPOK Jazz, led by Franco Luambo, then considered Africa's premier orchestra. At its peak, TPOK Jazz boasted close to 40 musicians from both Congo-Kinshasa and Congo-Brazzaville and stood at the cutting edge of African music. Following the expansion of TPOK Jazz into international markets, the orchestra split into two units: one stationed in Europe under Franco's direct leadership, and another based in Kinshasa, where Papa Noël served as lead guitarist and a principal songwriter. Among his contributions was the 1982 song "Tangawizi", a narrative about a marital breakup told through the perspectives of two women. However, his relationship with Franco became strained in 1984 after Papa Noël recorded the solo album Bon Samaritain at the IAD studio in Brazzaville without Franco's authorization. Following Franco's death in 1989, Papa Noël established himself permanently in France and began a solo career.

== Solo career ==
=== 1984–1999: from Bon Samaritain to Galo Negro ===
Papa Noël began his solo career while still a member of TPOK Jazz, releasing his debut studio album Bon Samaritain at the Brazzaville-based studio of Industrie Africaine Du Disque (IAD). This project, undertaken without the authorization of Franco Luambo, featured contributions from local Brazzaville musicians. The album was engineered by Freddy Kebano, with Martin Bakala and Basile Nganga serving as assistant engineers. Bon Samaritain was met with critical acclaim and went on to win the award for Best Song of the Year. However, the unauthorized nature of its release, coupled with its commercial success, strained Papa Noël's relationship with Franco. According to Congolese musicologist Clément Ossinondé, a "disciplinary imbroglio" ensued, ultimately leading to Papa Noël's departure from TPOK Jazz.

Papa Noël solidified his break from the band with the release of his second studio album Allegria in 1986. Produced by Vilnair Production and distributed by Sonog Distribution, the album consisted entirely of songs written and composed by Papa Noël himself. After Franco's death in 1989, Papa Noël relocated permanently to France, where he continued to develop his solo career. In 1992, he joined former TPOK Jazz colleagues Simaro Lutumba, Ndombe Opetum, and Josky Kiambukuta in Brussels to record Bakitani, the album debut of Bana OK, a band led by Simaro Lutumba.

In 1994, Papa Noël released his third studio album, Haute Tension, under Production Les Mampoko's. The album featured eight tracks and included guest appearances by Carlyto Lassa and Wuta Mayi. Clément Ossinondé described Haute Tension as exhibiting "strong rhythmic originality and high tension". In 1995, Papa Noël reunited with longtime associate and fellow TPOK Jazz alumnus Sam Mangwana for a U.S. tour. This collaboration led to his involvement in Mangwana's 1998 album Galo Negro, where Papa Noël contributed as both a composer, writing the track "Balobi", and as the musical director of the accompanying band. He supported the album with international tour stops, including performances in Milwaukee and Tucson, Arizona.

=== 2000–2024: from Bel Ami to "Put It Down" ===
In 2000, in honor of his 60th birthday, the English label Stern's Music released Bel Ami, a compilation that brought together tracks from his earlier albums recorded in 1984 and 1994. French music journalist François Bensignor praised Bel Ami for showcasing the strength of Papa Noël's compositions, arrangements, and guitar performances. That same year, Papa Noël gave a critically acclaimed "unplugged" performance at the World of Music, Arts and Dance (WOMAD) festival, alongside fellow Congolese guitarists Mose Se Sengo and Syran Mbenza. Papa Noël continued his collaboration with Mangwana on the 2001 album Rumba Congo by Kékélé, a supergroup of veteran Congolese musicians. Under the production of Ibrahima Sylla, Papa Noël served as musical director.

In 2001, he met a young Cuban salsero Adan Pedroso after an impromptu performance at a castle in Germany. Their spontaneous collaboration revealed strong musical chemistry and inspired a series of performances, including a notable appearance at a guitar festival in Bath, Somerset. These sessions culminated in the 2001 release of Mosala Makasi, followed by a European tour. In 2002, with the facilitation of Anglo-Iranian producer Mo Fini, Papa Noël worked with Papi Oviedo, a prominent figure from the Buena Vista Social Club. The result of this collaboration, Bana Congo, released by Tumi Music, examined and celebrated the historical intersection of Cuban and Congolese musical expressions. The album received critical acclaim and was nominated for Best World Music Act at the 2002 MOBO Awards. That same year, Papa Noël and Oviedo performed together at WOMAD Reading, and were joined by Congolese vocalists Nana and Baniel. He also toured Europe, including a notable 2004 appearance in Amsterdam.

On 2 April 2007, he released Café Noir, a ten-track album recorded across Kinshasa, Havana, London, and Paris. Produced by Tumi Music, the album fused elements of Congolese rumba and Cuban music. Café Noir featured an ensemble cast, including Cuban tres player Coto-Antonio Machín García and Cameroonian saxophonist Manu Dibango. The album's mostly instrumental tracks, such as "Africa Mokili Mobimba", emphasized guitar in place of piano, while other songs like "Sandokan" and "Tomatito" highlighted powerful brass arrangements. Notable vocal contributions included Abby Surya's performance on the song "Democratic". Papa Noël supported the album with a live performance in London on 2 July.

In 2013, he released the album Color, a "duo rumbaccordion" project recorded with French accordionist Viviane Arnoux, who had previously worked with him on the Mangwana and Kékélé projects. The 13-track album, released by Buda Musique, combined Congolese rumba with French musical traditions. Arnoux described working with Papa Noël as a rewarding experience. The duo subsequently toured France and South Africa. In 2015, Papa Noël was once again awarded the National Prize for Merit in Culture and the Arts, presented by the Congolese National Assembly on behalf of President Joseph Kabila. In 2020, Papa Noël and Arnoux recorded New Look, an eleven-track album released in 2021 by Halle Rock, followed by their reggae-inspired 2024 single, "Put It Down".

== Death ==
=== Hospitalization, death and tribute ===
In January 2024, Papa Noël was hospitalized in Grigny, in the Essonne department of France. During this period, he issued a public appeal for support, addressing fans, fellow musicians, and officials of the Congolese government in Kinshasa. In an impassioned video shared online, he described his deteriorating health and personal difficulties, noting his long absence from the public stage and concerns about the fate of his property in Kinshasa.

Papa Noël died on 11 November 2024, at the age of 83, in a hospital in Draveil, France. On 16 November 2024, the Town Hall of Grigny, represented by Deputy Mayor Claire Tawab, organized a tribute evening at the Alice-Milliat Gymnasium. The event gathered numerous musicians and admirers, including Théo Blaise Kounkou, Loko Massengo, Nyboma, Wuta Mayi, Faugus, Dino Vangu, Ziko Simba, Popolipo, Komba Bello, Fofo Le Collégien, Flavien Makabi, Ada Mouanguissa, Jean Demolayi, Simolo Katondi, Elba, Edy Maboungou, Homba Le Petit Bokul, Aemeric, Odile Wanake, Jose Kapesa, Lolo Motima, Mapro, among others, who came to honor his memory through music and personal reminiscences. During the evening, his widow, Dadie Nedule, expressed her profound gratitude and grief, while Deputy Mayor Tawab praised Papa Noël's artistic contributions and moral character, describing him as a free spirit and a legend of Congolese rumba.

=== Repatriation of his remains and discreet burial ===
Plans were made for the repatriation of Papa Noël's body to Kinshasa, with the removal scheduled for 1 March 2025. However, by February 2025, La Prospérité reported that petitions by his family for assistance from the governments of the Democratic Republic of the Congo and the Republic of the Congo had met with silence, despite Papa Noël's explicit desire to be interred in Kinshasa. Former Republic of Congo Minister of Justice Ouabari Mariotti also intervened, urging the DRC authorities to ensure repatriation in accordance with Papa Noël's last wishes. A funeral ceremony was held in Villetaneuse, France, on 2 March 2025, during which Émile Ngoy Kassongo, Ambassador of the DRC to France, paid tribute on behalf of President Félix Tshisekedi. Papa Noël's remains were finally repatriated to Kinshasa on 4 March 2025.

On 10 March 2025, his interment was carried out discreetly at Gombe Cemetery in Kinshasa, where Le Grand Kallé, Franco Luambo, and Nico Kasanda were also rested. The burial, held at dusk, occurred without public ceremonies or official state presence, and was overshadowed by internal family disputes over funeral expenses. The modest nature of the burial was widely criticized as a missed opportunity to properly honor a figure of Papa Noël's stature.

== Residency challenges in France ==
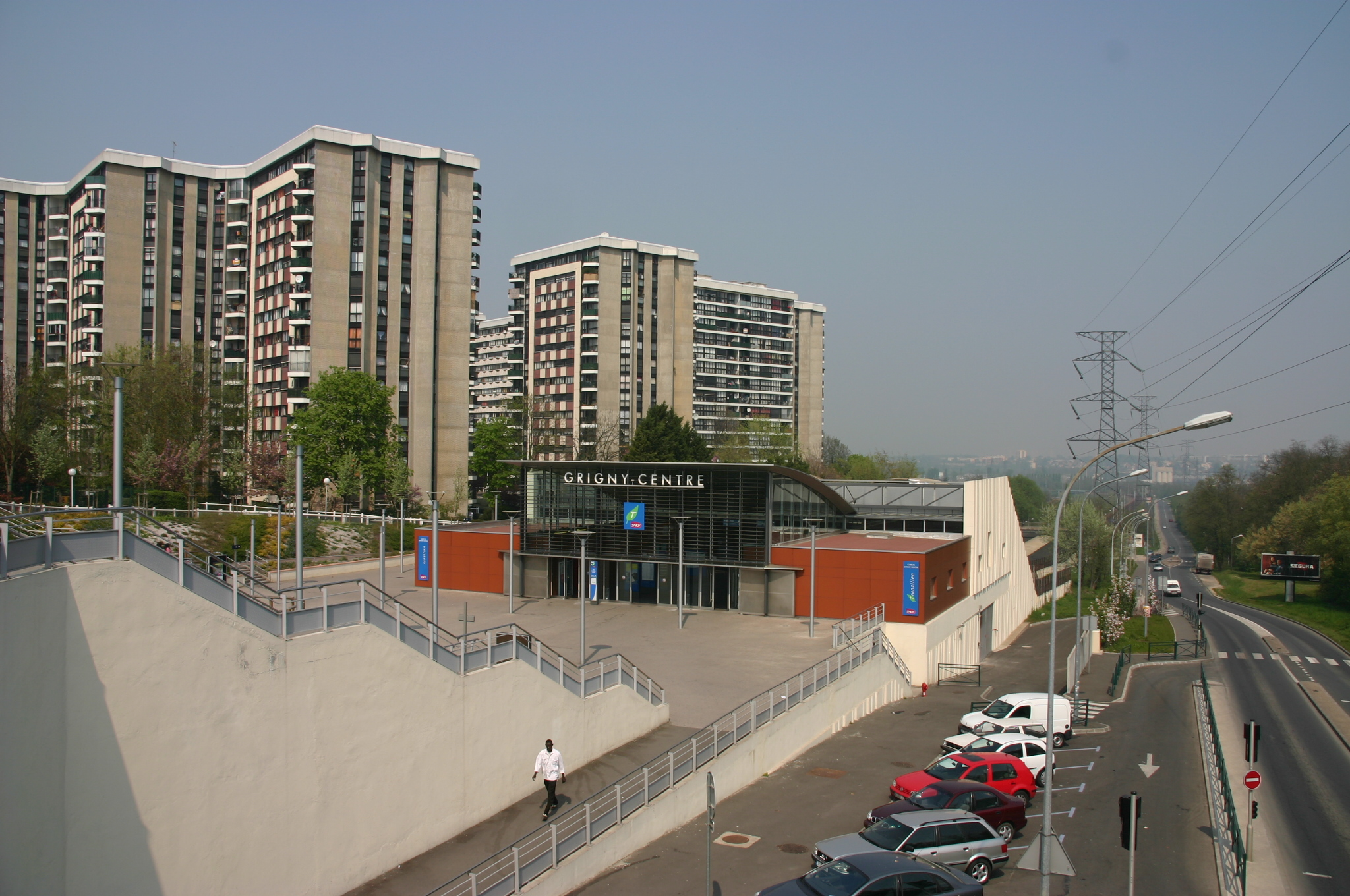
A view of Grigny, Essonne, where Papa Noël faced challenges obtaining residency, featuring the Grigny-Centre station.

Between the 1980s and 1994, while residing in Grigny, Papa Noël faced significant legal and personal challenges related to his residency status. His wife, Danielle, employed as a night nurse in a local nursing home, dedicated considerable effort during the day to securing legal documentation for her husband. Despite her efforts, Papa Noël became entangled in a complex and distressing legal ordeal. Shortly before a scheduled performance at the Bataclan in Paris, where he was set to accompany singer Sam Mangwana as an opening act for Youssou N'Dour, Papa Noël performed in Évry as part of the Telethon benefit event. After the concert, in the early hours of a winter morning around 1:30 a.m., he boarded the Réseau Express Régional train to return home, where his wife and five-year-old son awaited him at Grigny station.

Upon arriving at their residential parking lot at La Grande Borne, the family was suddenly surrounded by police officers. Papa Noël was forcibly searched, handcuffed, and taken into custody despite his wife's attempts to explain that he was returning from a concert. Their young son, witnessing the scene, was traumatized. Danielle was barred from entering the police station and spent the night outside with their child.

The following day, Danielle mobilized support from the couple's network of musicians, friends, and sympathizers. The collective protest caused a major disruption at the police station, drawing attention to Papa Noël's case. Bowing to mounting pressure, the authorities authorized his release by 4 p.m. that afternoon. Approximately one week later, Papa Noël was summoned back to the precinct, where he was finally granted his inaugural one-year residence permit. Shortly thereafter, he embarked for Houston, Texas, initiating an American tour that symbolically closed a protracted and agonizing five-year saga.

== Discography ==
=== Solo albums ===
- Bon Samaritain (1984, IAD)
- Allegria (1986, Vilnair)
- Haute Tension (1994)
- Bel Ami (2000, Sterns)
- Mosala Makasi with Adan Pedroso (2001, Yard High)
- Bana Congo with Papi Oviedo (2002, Tumi Music)
- Café Noir (2007, Tumi Music/Nocturne)
- New Look (2021, Halle Rock)

=== Breakout songs ===
- "Tangawizi" (1982)

=== Contributing artist ===
- The Rough Guide to Congo Gold (2008, World Music Network)
