= Beguen Band =

- Also known as: Orchestre Beguen Band
- Origin: Léopoldville (modern-day Kinshasa
- Genres: Congolese rumba; cha-cha-chá; merengue; tango; calypso; bolero
- Years active: 1950s–1960s
- Label: Ngoma
- Spinoffs: Beguen Jazz; Milo Jazz
- Past members: André João (Depiano); Tuka Floriant (Tchadé); Franck Lassan; Léon Bukasa; N6; Kiyika Masamba (Flamy); Pierre "De La France" Bazeta; Emmanuel Tshilumba Balozi (Tino Baroza); Charles Déchaud Mwamba; Augustin Moniania (Roitelet); Magnol; Albino Kalombo; Etari Henri; Julio

Orchestre Beguen Band (also known simply as Beguen Band) was a Congolese rumba ensemble active during the 1950s and early 1960s. Formed as one of the house bands of the Ngoma record label, the band played a significant role in shaping and popularizing Congolese rumba in both the former Belgian Congo and the former French Equatorial Africa. It featured a roster of highly influential musicians, including vocalists André João (Depiano), Tuka Floriant (Tchadé), Franck Lassan, Léon Bukasa, N6, and Kiyika Masamba (Flamy), as well as instrumentalists such as guitarists Pierre "De La France" Bazeta, Emmanuel Antoine Tshilumba wa Baloji (Tino Baroza), Charles Déchaud Mwamba, and Augustin Moniania (Roitelet), bassist Magnol, saxophonist and clarinetist Albino Kalombo, trumpeter Etari Henri, and drummer Julio.

In 1960, following a tour in Conakry, Guinea, the orchestra split into two new formations: Beguen Jazz, led by Depiano, Tchadé, Flamy, and De La France; and Milo Jazz, formed by Damoiseau, Roitelet, Tino Baroza, Depuissant, Maproco, and Menga André, many of whom later joined Joseph Kabasele's renowned African Jazz.

== History ==
The exact date of Orchestre Beguen Band's formation remains uncertain, but it emerged in the mid-1950s as one of the house bands of the Ngoma record label under the patronage of its president, Manuel d'Oliveira. Composed mainly of musicians in their early thirties, the band brought together a number of vocalists and instrumentalists who would go on to become central figures in Congolese rumba. Its core lineup included vocalists such as André João (Depiano), Tuka Floriant (Tchadé), Franck Lassan, Léon Bukasa, N6, and Kiyika Masamba (Flamy); guitarists Pierre "De La France" Bazeta (solo), Emmanuel Antoine Tshilumba wa Baloji (Tino Baroza), Charles Déchaud Mwamba, and Augustin Moniania (Roitelet); as well as Magnol (double bass), Albino Kalombo (saxophone and clarinet), Etari Henri (trumpet), and Julio (drums).

However, some sources suggest that certain prominent musicians, including Depiano, members of the Trio BOW (Bukasa, Emmanuel Mayungu d'Oliveira, better known as Manuel d'Oliveira, and Antoine Wendo Kolosoy), Etari Henri, Degauche, Katembo Ignace, Léon Bukasa, and Tino Baroza, may have only been associated with or accompanied the band rather than being full-time members. The band rapidly gained popularity, receiving invitations to perform across the Malebo Pool in both the former Belgian Congo and the former French Equatorial Africa. Its growing reputation allowed it to rival major contemporary orchestras such as OK Jazz, African Jazz, and Rock-a-Mambo. According to Congolese music journalist Antoine Manda Tchebwa, a significant milestone in the professionalization of Congolese music occurred in 1959, when Greek producer Jeronimidis of Ngoma Editions (Tam-Tam) established what he described as the first "nursery of professional musicians". Through the support of Ngoma, Beguen Band was provided with modern musical instruments, including banjo, bass, horns, and a complete drum set, and access to radio broadcasting, while its members were also placed on fixed monthly salaries, a notable innovation in the Congolese music industry at the time.

In September 1960, Beguen Band embarked on a highly successful tour across several West African countries, including Ghana, Côte d'Ivoire, and Guinea. Their performances were well received, enhancing both the band's prestige and the reputation of Ngoma records. One highlight of the tour was a recording session at Radio Côte d'Ivoire featuring Flamy, Maproko (saxophone), Depiano, Tchadé, and Magnol. Following their return from Conakry, Guinea that year, the band underwent a major split. This led to the creation of two separate groups: Beguen Jazz, composed of Depiano, Tchadé, Flamy, and De La France; and Milo Jazz, formed by Damoiseau, Roitelet, Tino Baroza, Depuissant, Maproko, and Menga André, several of whom later joined Joseph Kabasele's renowned Africa Jazz.

== Discography ==
=== Compilation of works ===
Year	Title	Details	Sources
24 July 1958	Side A (J. 3761): "Présentation Beguen" – Lingala and French (Cha-cha-chá); Side B (J. 3762): "Henya" – Spanish (Congolese rumba)	Format: Vinyl record; Label: Ngoma	
15 June 1961	Side A (2180): Tchadé with Beguen Band: 1. "Rythmo De Mi Coraco" (Tchadé) – Spanish (Cha-cha-chá); 2. "Ata Mokanda Te" (Tchadé) – Lingala (Congolese rumba); Side B (2181): Flamy with Beguen Band: 1. "Miyangele" (Flamy) – Lingala (Congolese rumba); 2. "Mu Nzila Nsona" (Flamy) – Kikongo (Merengue)	Format: Vinyl record; Label: Ngoma; No. 36 [45/71 & 45/72]	
24 August 1961	Side A (2187): Maproco with Beguen Band: 1. "Naleli Mingi" (Maproco) – Lingala (Congolese rumba); 2. "U.A.T." (Maproco) – Spanish (Cha-cha-chá); Side B (2188): Tchadé with Beguen Band: 1. "Les Jeunes de Beguen" (Tchadé) – French (Tango); 2. "I Love You" (Tchadé) – English (Cha-cha-chá)	Format: Vinyl record; Label: Ngoma; No. 39 [45/77 & 45/78]	
Side A: 24 August 1961 Side B: 7 April 1960	Side A (2186): De Piano with Beguen Band: 1. "Bolingo Nkisi Te" (De Piano) – Lingala (Congolese rumba); 2. "Bondima Te" (De Piano) – Lingala (Cha-cha-chá); Side B (2098): Magnol with Beguen Band: 1. "Nzo Kuleka Ko" (Magnol) – Lingala (Cha-cha-chá); 2. "Anzelu Ya Nzambe" (Magnol) – Lingala (Congolese rumba)	Format: Vinyl record; Label: Ngoma; No. 41 [45/81 & 45/82]	
Side A: 29 May 1959 Side B: 14 April 1959	Pierre De La France with Beguen Band Side A (A1 & A2, 1966): 1. "Tika Na Fanda" – Lingala (Congolese rumba); 2. "Mbanda Osuki" – Lingala (Cha-cha-chá); Side B (B1 & B2, 1931): 1. "Ezalaka Mwasi Moko" – Lingala (Congolese rumba); 2. "Eloko Nini Bakosala" – Lingala (Calypso)	Format: Vinyl record; Label: Ngoma; No. 1025 [2049 & 2050]	
Side A: 2 October 1959 Side B: 13 October 1959	Side A (A1 & A2, 2023): Tchadé with Beguen Band: 1. "Yo Me Moero" – Spanish/Lingala (Cha-cha-chá); 2. "Mono Kwame Ya Nzola" – Kikongo (Merengue); Side B (B1 & B2, 2039): Magnol with Beguen Band: 1. "Mawa Mingi Na Ngai" – Lingala (Cha-cha-chá); 2. "Voyage Pointe Noire" – Lingala (Congolese rumba)	Format: Vinyl record; Label: Ngoma; No. 1030 [2059 & 2060]	
8 October 1959	Mavula Baudouin with Beguen Band Side A (A1 & A2, 2034): 1. "Kwilu Kwango En Avant" – Kimbala (Calypso); 2. "Nguma Alubi" – Lingala (Cha-cha-chá); Side B (B1 & B2, 2035): 1. "Kilefu Gigomenga Gugonu" – Kimbala (Congolese rumba and merengue); 2. "Bolala Malamu Ekomi Lobi" – Lingala (Cha-cha-chá)	Format: Vinyl record; Label: Ngoma; No. 1046 [2091/2092]	

=== Compilation of works by the successor band Beguen Jazz ===
Year	Title	Details
25 June 1963	Flamy and Beguen Jazz: 1. Side A: "Louise Okobosana Flammy" – Lingala (Congolese rumba) [JDN 41A]; 2. Side B: "Biso Bilombeya Lelo" – Lingala (Congolese rumba) [JDN 41B]	Format: Vinyl record; Label: Ngoma (J DN 41)
25 June 1963	De La France and Beguen Jazz: 1. Side A: "Naleli Bernadette" – Lingala (Congolese rumba) [JDN 42A]; 2. Side B: "Chérie Oye" – Lingala (Cha-cha-chá) [JDN 42B]	Format: Vinyl record; Label: Ngoma (J DN 42)
25 June 1963	Tchade and Beguen Jazz: 1. Side A: "Etula Madite" – Lingala (Congolese rumba) [JDN 43A]; 2. Side B: "Kukiele" – Kikongo (Cha-cha-chá) [JDN 43B]	Format: Vinyl record; Label: Ngoma (J DN 43)
26 June 1963	Flamy and Beguen Jazz: 1. Side A: "Ebongi Omona Na Miso" – Lingala (Congolese rumba) [JDN 47A]; 2. Side B: "Marie Louise Na Préfère" – Lingala (Congolese rumba) [JDN 47B]	Format: Vinyl record; Label: Ngoma (J DN 47)
16 July 1963	Flamy and Beguen Jazz: 1. Side A: "Sonorie Cha Cha" – Spanish (Cha-cha-chá) [JDN 70A]; 2. Side B: "Article 15 Oyebi Yango" – Lingala (Congolese rumba) [JDN 70B]	Format: Vinyl record; Label: Ngoma (J DN 70)
16 July 1963	Tchade and Beguen Jazz: 1. Side A: "Naboyi" – Lingala (Congolese rumba) [JDN 72A]; 2. Side B: "Les Yeux d'une Femme Amoureuse" – Lingala (Bolero) [JDN 72B]	Format: Vinyl record; Label: Ngoma (J DN 72)
16 July 1963	Belos and Beguen Jazz: 1. Side A: "Puedo Más" – Lingala (Cha-cha-chá) [JDN 73A]; 2. Side B: "Annie Wa Ngai" – Lingala (Congolese rumba) [JDN 73B]	Format: Vinyl record; Label: Ngoma (J DN 73)
17 July 1963	Maproco and Beguen Jazz: 1. Side A: "Bobali Ya Kowilleo" – Lingala (Congolese rumba) [JDN 84A]; 2. Side B: "Maproco Cantar" – (Cha-cha-chá) [JDN 84B]	Format: Vinyl record; Label: Ngoma (J DN 84)
	Flamy and Beguen Jazz: 1. Side A: "Songi Songi Ezalimabe" – Lingala (Bolero) [JDN 97A]; 2. Side B: "Tata Sendue Na Katanga" – Lingala (Congolese rumba) [JDN 97B]	Format: Vinyl record; Label: Ngoma (J DN 97)
