= Camille Feruzi =

Congolese musician and singer (1912–1990)

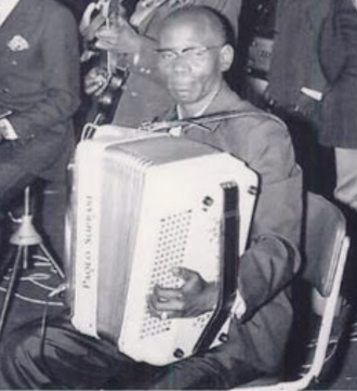
- Feruzi playing accordion

Background information
- Born: Camille Feruzi c. 1912; Stanleyville, Belgian Congo (now Kisangani, DRC)
- Origin: Kisangani
- Died: 24 April 1990 (aged 78)
- Genres: Congolese rumba
- Occupations: Accordionist; singer; composer; arranger; bandleader
- Instruments: Accordion; vocals
- Years active: 1930s–1990
- Labels: Ngoma; Fiesta; Fonior; Editions Populaires
- Formerly of: Mystérieux Jazz

Camille Feruzi (1912 – 24 April 1990) was a Congolese accordionist, singer, composer, arranger, and bandleader. Alongside Antoine Kasongo Kitenge, Paul Kamba, Zacharie Elenga, Antoine Wendo Kolosoy, Henri Bowane, and Manuel d'Oliveira, Feruzi is commonly regarded as one of the pioneers of Congolese rumba and is often credited as the first musician to introduce the accordion into Congolese urban music.

== Life and career ==
=== 1912–early to mid-1940s: Early life, career beginnings, and urban music scene ===
Camille Feruzi was born in 1912 in Stanleyville (now Kisangani), in the Belgian Congo (now the Democratic Republic of the Congo). He learned to play maringa music, one of the main predecessors of modern Congolese rumba, from his father, who was also an accordion player. As a child, Feruzi often practiced the instrument in secret while his father was away at work. In 1927, at the age of fifteen, he moved by riverboat to Léopoldville (now Kinshasa), the colony's largest urban center. There, he became immersed in the city's expanding musical and entertainment scene, and developed his musical abilities through performances at dances, social gatherings, and popular venues.

The exact date when Feruzi formed his quartet remains uncertain. Music historian Gary Stewart estimated that the group was established "around 1938 or 1939", while other sources date its formation in 1937. The quartet consisted of accordion, piano, guitar, and saxophone and is regarded as one of the earliest instrumental groups in Léopoldville. Influenced in part by a saxophonist from Guadeloupe, the ensemble gradually moved beyond traditional maringa music and began incorporating rhythms inspired by Latin American dance music.

During the early 1940s, Cuban son recordings by groups such as Sexteto Habanero, Trio Matamoros, and Los Guaracheros de Oriente were frequently broadcast on Radio Congo Belge in Léopoldville and quickly became popular among Congolese audiences. Local musicians adapted elements of Cuban son, including its instrumental arrangements and melodic structures, to guitars, saxophones, and other instruments. Some performers even sang in phonetic Spanish or French. Over time, these influences were fused with indigenous rhythms, vocal traditions, and melodic ideas, which gave rise to a distinctly Congolese musical idiom. Although maringa had little direct connection to Cuban rumba, the emerging style became known as "Congolese rumba" because imported Cuban records were commonly marketed as "rumba". During this period, Congolese musicians also experimented with other Caribbean genres, including biguine and merengue. According to musicologist Kazadi wa Mukuna, Congolese rumba remained fundamentally rooted in maringa traditions, while Latin American music primarily served as a source of instrumental techniques, orchestration, and arrangement practices.

=== Late 1940s–1970s: Releases, Mystérieux Jazz, and later years ===
Through his quartet, Feruzi became one of the first musicians signed by the Ngoma label in 1948. His earliest successes included the recordings "Makango" (Ngoma 27) and "Polina" (Ngoma 29). Although his prominence later declined during the early 1950s as amplified instruments and electric guitar-based ensembles gained greater importance in Congolese popular music, he revived his career around 1956 or 1957 by founding the orchestra Mystérieux Jazz. The group included bassist Albert Tawumani and vocalists Beya, also known as Ténor Beya, and Mariola. Their first recording, released in early 1957, featured "Biso Na Yo Mbula Moko" on the A-side and "Nabala Muluba" on the B-side. While the record achieved only modest success, the group returned to the studio about a year later to record "Emiyama" and "Na Motindeli Mokanda". Both songs became major hits and helped establish Mystérieux Jazz as one of Ngoma's leading recording ensembles.

In 1959, at the age of 47, Feruzi recorded songs in Indoubil, an urban slang spoken in Léopoldville during the period. That same year, several of his recordings were issued as part of Ngoma's Super 45t series, including "Nabala Muluba" and three other songs. He also recorded "Cha Cha Cha Bay", one of his most successful compositions, which was performed in Indoubil and blended elements of Congolese rumba, jazz, and Afro-Cuban music.

During the early 1970s, Feruzi collaborated with TPOK Jazz and performed alongside Franco Luambo. In 1971, like many Zairean musicians of the period, he embraced the Authenticité campaign promoted by Mobutu Sese Seko, which encouraged cultural nationalism and the adoption of African names and identities. At the end of 1971, he recorded with Franco "Recours à l'authenticité" ("recourse to authenticity"), a song that combined acoustic guitar, accordion, and traditional percussion instruments. Other recordings associated with this period included the 1972 songs "Mbanda Nasali Nini" and "Siluvangi Wapi Accordéon?", which were released on the Fiesta label, a subsidiary of the Belgian record company Fonior, through Franco's Editions Populaires series. In the late 1970s, Feruzi also contributed accordion accompaniment to recordings by Lita Bembo, including the 1978 song "Gida Accordéon".

== Death ==
According to information cited by researcher Mfumu Fylla Saint-Eudes, Camille Feruzi died on 24 April 1990 at the age of 78.

== Selected discography ==
Year	Records	Label	Details	Ref.
1948	Side A: "Makango"; Side B: "Therese"	Ngoma	Format: Shellac; Language: Lingala	
–	Side A: "Bernard"; Side B: "Marie-Louise"	Ngoma	Format: Shellac; Language: Lingala	
–	Side A: "Polina"; Side B: "Marie Ekwetenge"	Ngoma	Format: Shellac; Language: Lingala	
–	Side A: "Moasi na Ngai ya Moke"; Side B: "Moasi ya Zoba"	Ngoma	Format: Shellac; Language: Lingala	
26 February 1957	Side A: "Biso Nayo Mbula Moko"; Side B: "Nabala Muluba"	Ngoma	Format: Shellac; Language: Lingala; Written by: Camille Feruzi; Vocals by: Ténor Mariola and François Jacqy; Side A instrumentation: Accordion, saxophone, trumpet, double bass, and tam-tam; Side B instrumentation: Accordion, saxophone, double bass, and tam-tam	
1957	Side A: "Lolendo Nayo na Ngai"; Side B: "Eugénie"	Ngoma	Format: Shellac; Language: Lingala; Written by: Camille Feruzi; Vocals by: Ténor Mariola and François Jacqy; Side A: Accordion, double bass, tam-tam, and two guitars; Side B: Two guitars, double bass, accordion, maracas, and tam-tam	
22 April 1958	Side A: "Gaby wa Ngai"; Side B: "Rosa Nayali Nayo"	Ngoma	Side A: Written by: Ténor Mariola; Vocals by: Ténor Mariola and Léon Kabuya; Accordion: Camille Feruzi; Guitar: Emmanuel Tshilumba wa Boloji "Tino Baroza"; Double bass: Augustin Moniania "Roitelet"; Language: Lingala; Format: Shellac; Side B: Written by: Camille Feruzi; Vocals by: Ténor Mariola and Léon Kabuya; Guitar: Tino Baroza; Double bass: Roitelet; Language: Lingala; Format: Shellac	
24 April 1958	Side A: "Cherie Martha"; Side B: "Feca Nalinga Yo"	Ngoma	Format: Shellac; Language: Lingala; Camille Feruzi; Vocals by: Ténor Mariola and Léon Kabuya; Guitar: Tino Baroza; Double bass: Roitelet	
1958	Side A: "Emiyama"; Side B: "Na Motindeli Mokanda"	Ngoma	Format: Shellac; Language: Lingala; Written by: Camille Feruzi; Vocals by: Léon Kabuya and Ténor Mariola; Instrumentation: Two guitars, accordion, double bass, and tam-tam	
14 August 1958	Side A: "Bernadette"; Side B: "Nani Wana (Béatrice)"	Ngoma	Side A: Format: Shellac; Language: Lingala; Written by: Camille Feruzi; Vocals by: Mariola and Aembeston; Guitar: Tino Baroza; Second guitar: Delafrance; Double bass: Roitelet; Side B: Format: Shellac; Language: Lingala; Written by: Léon Kabuya; Vocals by: Kabuya and Mariola; Guitars: Tino Baroza and Delafrance; Double bass: Roitelet	
–	Side A: "Marie Sombo"; Side B: "Marie Josée"	Ngoma	Format: Shellac; Language: Lingala; Written by: Ténor Mariola; Accordion: Camille Feruzi; Vocals by: Ténor Mariola and Léon Kabuya; Instrumentation: Two guitars, accordion, double bass, and tam-tam	
–	Side A: "Nazelaki Makango"; Side B: "Mabe ya Ngai"	Ngoma	Format: Shellac; Language: Lingala; Written By: Feruzi and Mariola	
–	Side A: "Eliko Chikita"; Side B: "Mexicana"	Ngoma	Format: Shellac; Language: Lingala; Written By: Feruzi and Mariola	
20 March 1959	Side A: "Okoluka Nani"; Side B: "Aimee Wa E'Ville"	Ngoma	Format: Shellac; Language: Lingala; Side A written by: Feruzi; Side B written by: François Jacquy and Aembeston; Contrabass: Bernard Tchébaud; Guitar: Albert Tawumani and André Castor; Vocals: Aembeston and Jacquy	
1959	"Cha Cha Cha Bay"	Ngoma	Format: Shellac; Language: Indoubil; Written By: Feruzi	
1959	Side A: "Rico Baila"; Side B: "Kolela Cherie"	Ngoma	Format: Shellac; Language: Lingala	
1971	"Recours à l'authenticité"	Fiesta and Editions Populaires series	Format: Vinyl record; Language: Lingala; Written By: Feruzi and Franco Luambo	
1972	Side A: "Mbanda Nasali Nini"; Side B: "Siluvangi Wapi Accordéon?"	Fiesta and Editions Populaires series	Format: Vinyl record; Language: Lingala; Written by: Feruzi	
1978	"Gida Accordéon"	–	Format: Vinyl record; Language: Lingala; Written by: Feruzi	
