= Antoine Kasongo Kitenge =

Congolese musician

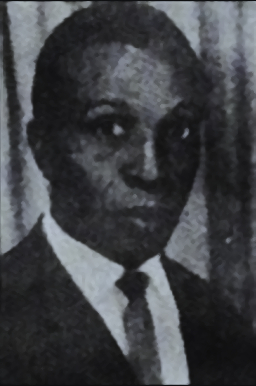
- Antoine Kasongo Kitenge in the 1940s

Background information
- Born: c. 1923; Maniema, Belgian Congo
- Origin: Maniema
- Died: 2000 (aged 76–77) Kinshasa, Democratic Republic of the Congo
- Genre: Congolese rumba
- Occupations: Clarinetist; saxophonist; composer; bandleader
- Instruments: Clarinet; saxophone
- Labels: Olympia; Ngoma
- Formerly of: Américain; Antoine Kasongo et son orchestre

Antoine Kasongo Kitenge (1923 – 2000) was a Congolese clarinetist, saxophonist, bandleader, and composer who played a significant role in the rise of modern urban music in Léopoldville (now Kinshasa) during the 1940s and 1950s. He is regarded as one of the earliest innovators of Congolese rumba and brass-band orchestration. Kasongo's orchestra became especially known for helping introduce and popularize the sebene, an instrumental section structured around cyclical melodic phrases, polyrhythmic guitar interplay, and syncopated rhythmic accompaniment that later became central to rumba and soukous arrangements.

He was among the first Congolese musicians to modernize Congolese rumba before the rise of artists such as Le Grand Kallé and Franco Luambo. In 1949, he recorded several influential works for the Ngoma label alongside guitarist Zacharie Elenga, including "Libala Liboso Se Sukali", "Baloba Balemba", "Naboya Ki Kobina", and "Se Na Mboka". Kasongo's final known studio recordings include his contribution to "Malata", a 1970 song by Franco and TPOK Jazz composed by Camille Feruzi, on which he is featured alongside Feruzi. The song was re-released by Planet Ilunga on the compilation La Rumba De Mi Vida.

== Life and career ==
=== Early life and musical training ===
Antoine Kasongo Kitenge was born in 1923. He was originally from Maniema in the Belgian Congo (now the Democratic Republic of the Congo). He received his early musical training at the École Sainte-Cécile de Kintambo, where he performed in the school's brass band. Although he first learned the clarinet, he later switched to the saxophone and became noted for his understanding of musical notation and orchestral arrangement. Like many pioneers of early Congolese urban music, Kasongo benefited from the musical education provided by missionary schools and colonial-era school fanfares. His musical development was also shaped by self-teaching, practical performance experience, and exposure to African, European, jazz, and Caribbean musical traditions.

=== Early orchestras and urban music scene ===
During the 1940s, Léopoldville (now Kinshasa) experienced rapid urban growth alongside the expansion of bars, dance halls, and social clubs that supported a growing nightlife culture. Within this environment, Kasongo formed one of the city's earliest jazz orchestras, which performed at public dances held at Parc de Bock, now known as the Kinshasa Botanical Garden, as well as other entertainment venues across the city. According to Antoine Wendo Kolosoy, Kasongo's orchestra existed before the arrival of the West African Coastmen musicians and should therefore be regarded as one of the first modern orchestras in Léopoldville. Some later writers confused Kasongo's group with Odéon Kinois, although several historians and musicians later distinguished the two ensembles as separate orchestras. Music historian Jean-Pierre François Nimy Nzonga instead refers to Kasongo's ensemble simply as "Antoine Kasongo et son orchestre" ("Antoine Kasongo and his orchestra"). Kasongo also briefly performed with the orchestra Américain, one of Léopoldville's leading rival brass orchestras during the 1940s.

The city's early orchestras were heavily influenced by brass-band instrumentation, Caribbean dance music such as biguine, and Cuban and Latin American records that circulated through bars and radio broadcasts. Groups such as Sexteto Habanero, Trio Matamoros, and Los Guaracheros de Oriente were regularly broadcast on Radio Congo Belge in Léopoldville, and quickly became popular across the country. Congolese musicians started adapting elements of Cuban son by transferring piano melodies, trumpet phrasing, and drum patterns to guitars and saxophones. Some musicians even sang in phonetic Spanish or French. Over time, however, they increasingly blended these influences with local rhythms and melodies, giving the music a more distinctly Congolese character. Although maringa music had little direct connection to Cuban rumba, audiences in the Congo gradually began referring to the style as "Congolese rumba" because imported records by groups such as Sexteto Habanero and Trio Matamoros were frequently labeled as "rumba". Musicologist Kazadi wa Mukuna emphasized that Congolese rumba remained deeply rooted in maringa traditions, while Latin music mainly served as a model for learning orchestration, instrumentation, and studio recording techniques. Once Congolese musicians mastered these techniques, many foreign stylistic elements were gradually minimized because they did not fully correspond to local musical aesthetics. Franco Luambo later explained this distinction by arguing that, despite the use of horns and some Latin influences, the melodies, guitar playing, rhythms, and tonal structures of Congolese rumba remained fundamentally African.

=== Sebene ===
Antoine Kasongo and his orchestra began releasing music through the Olympia label in 1947, before signing with Ngoma in 1949. His collaboration with guitarist Zacharie Elenga, known as "Jimmy à la Hawaïenne" (Jimmy the Hawaiian), resulted in several influential recordings, including "Libala liboso se sukali" ("Marriage is sweet at first"), "Baloba balemba" ("we don't care about their gossip"), "Naboyaki kobina" ("I refused to dance"), "Se na mboka" ("It's in the village"), "Sebene", "Nzungu ya sika" ("New pot" or metaphorically, "new woman"), among others. Vocalists Jeanne Ninin and Caroline Mpia also played an important role in these recordings. The sebene, an instrumental bridge used to accentuate guitar improvisation, emerged prominently during this period and is largely attributed to Kasongo's innovation.

== Death ==
Antoine Kasongo died in Kinshasa in 2000 at age 77.
