= Léon Bukasa =

Congolese musician (1925–1974)

- Born: Léon Bukasa Tsonza; 1925; Jadotville, Katanga Province, Belgian Congo (modern-day Likasi, Haut-Katanga Province, Democratic Republic of the Congo)
- Died: 16 January 1974 (aged 48)
- Genres: Congolese rumba
- Occupations: singer; songwriter; multi-instrumentalist
- Instruments: guitar; accordion; piano; violin; clarinet; saxophone
- Years active: 1940s–1970s
- Label: Ngoma
- Formerly of: Jazz Mango (formerly known as Watoto wa Katanga)

Léon Bukasa Tsonza (1925 – 16 January 1974), known professionally as Léon Bukasa, was a Congolese singer, songwriter, arranger, and multi-instrumentalist. Proficient in guitar, accordion, piano, violin, clarinet, and saxophone, he was a prominent figure in the early development of Congolese rumba and is credited with introducing the clarinet into modern Congolese music.

Born in Jadotville (now Likasi) in the Katanga Province of the former Belgian Congo, he developed an early interest in music after hearing a neighbor's phonograph. Inspired by the guitar sounds he heard, Bukasa built a three-string guitar to teach himself the instrument. While initially trained as a mechanic and working as an assembly agent at the Union Minière du Haut-Katanga, he later pursued a musical career. After moving to Léopoldville (now Kinshasa) in 1947, he was discovered by Henri Bowane, who introduced him to the Ngoma record label in 1949. Bukasa became one of the label's key figures and was notable for performing in Swahili, Tshiluba, and Lingala.

== Life and career ==
=== 1925–mid-1950s: Early life, career beginnings and move to Léopoldville ===
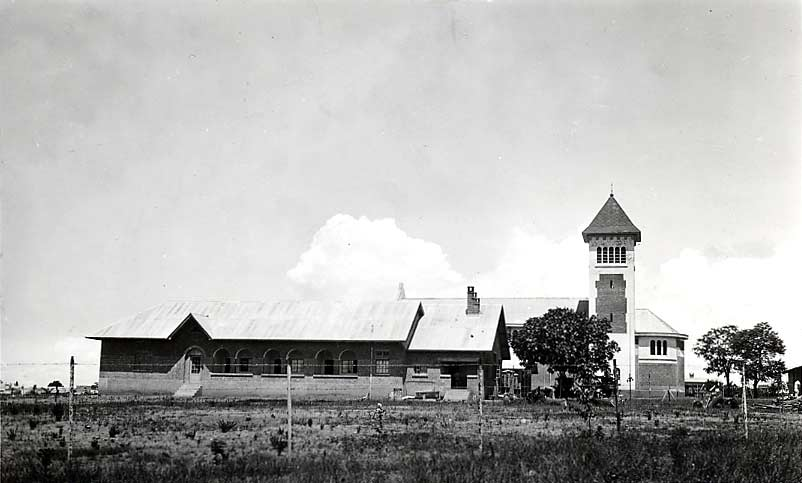
View of Jadotville (now Likasi) around 1930, the birthplace of Léon Bukasa.

Léon Bukasa Tsonza was born in 1925 in Jadotville (present-day Likasi) in the Katanga Province of the former Belgian Congo. From an early age, he was captivated by the sound of a phonograph he heard in a neighbor's house, particularly the guitar music, which inspired him to craft a three-string guitar to teach himself to play. While pursuing his musical interests, Bukasa also trained as a mechanic and later worked as an assembly agent at the Union Minière du Haut Katanga.

In 1947, at the age of 22, Bukasa moved to Léopoldville (now Kinshasa), where he found employment in his trained profession. That same year, he met musician and producer Henri Bowane, who recognized Bukasa's talent and introduced him to the Ngoma recording studio. Bukasa quickly became one of the pillars of the Ngoma label, helping to shape its early musical output. In 1950, Bukasa began performing with a backing band he called Watoto wa Katanga ("Children of Katanga" in Swahili), in honor of his home province. He achieved widespread success with the release of the Lingala-language hits "Rumba Soupareto" and "Bonne Année" in 1954. Other notable songs from this period include "Kuwata Webe Munsha", sung in Tshiluba, and "Bertha Roho Mbaya", a Swahili ballad marked by prominent banjo accompaniment. At Ngoma, Bukasa also collaborated with Manuel d'Oliveira and Antoine Wendo Kolosoy, forming the Trio BOW (Bukasa, d'Oliveira, Wendo), and recorded celebrated tracks such as "Bibi Wangu Madeleine", "Victoria Apiki Drapeau", and "Sango Ya Bana Ngoma", among others. His 1956 release "Balitaka Kunifunga Kweli", the B-side of "Bibi Bertha Mosoko", also cemented his reputation.

=== Later 1950s ===
Towards the end of the 1950s, as "jazz" became a fashionable term in Congolese music, Bukasa renamed his group Jazz Mango. During this period, he hired guitarist Papa Noël Nedule, with whom he recorded "Clara Badimuene" in 1957. Bukasa also toured extensively with a quartet that included saxophonist Albino Kalombo and bassist Joseph Mwena. That same year, he released another hit, "Simplice Wa Bolingo", backed by Papa Noël and Albino Kalombo. Bukasa's crisp and resonant baritone voice distinguished him from contemporaries like Le Grand Kallé, whose vocals were higher-pitched. He favored small ensembles, allowing for clear individual instrumental performances and often opening his songs with long instrumental passages before beginning the vocals. Notable songs from this era include "Louise Mungambule" (1958), with guitar work by Papa Noël's successor Raymond Braynck in a palm-wine style, and "Kobeta Mwasi Te", featuring a jaunty guitar and clarinet accompaniment alongside a cautionary message against violence towards women. By the late 1950s, Bukasa had become one of Ngoma's leading artists.

=== 1960s–1970s ===
In 1961, he successfully adapted to the rising popularity of the cha-cha-cha style with "Bukasa Aleli", a Lingala song lamenting lost love. In 1973, Bukasa contributed to the compilation Anthologie de la Musique Zaïroise Moderne Vol. 2, produced by Papa Noël Nedule as part of President Mobutu Sese Seko's Authenticité cultural policy. The album brought together several prominent figures in Congolese rumba, including Antoine Wendo Kolosoy, Manuel d'Oliveira, Camille Feruzi, Lucie Eyenga Moseka, and Adou Elenga.

== Death ==
According to music historian Gary Stewart in Rumba on the River: A History of the Popular Music of the Two Congos, Léon Bukasa died on 16 January 1974.
