= Elenga (surname) =

Elenga is a Congolese surname. Notable people with the surname include:

- Adou Elenga (1926–1981), Congolese singer-songwriter, composer and guitarist
- Zacharie Elenga, Congolese guitarist
