= Paul Kamba =

Congolese musician (1912–1950)

- Born: December 12, 1912; Mpouya, Congo
- Died: March 19, 1950 (aged 37) Brazzaville, Congo
- Genres: Congolese rumba
- Occupations: singer; songwriter; guitarist
- Instrument: Guitar
- Years active: 1935–1950
- Label: Ngoma

Paul Kamba (12 December 1912 – 19 March 1950) was a Congolese singer-songwriter, guitarist, and composer. He was among the earliest musicians to help shape the development of Congolese rumba and modern popular music in Central Africa. Noted for his singing, songwriting, and musical arrangements, Kamba played an important role in introducing and developing new styles of ensemble performance and contributed to the growth of urban dance music in the French Congo and the Belgian Congo, becoming one of the pioneers of Congolese popular music.

== Life and career ==
=== 1912–1935: Early life, education and musical debut ===
Paul Kamba was born on December 12, 1912, in Mpouya, French Equatorial Africa (now Republic of the Congo). Little is recorded about his early family life, but it is clear that his formative years were marked by academic and artistic promise. He attended Jeanne-d'Arc School in Brazzaville, one of the few institutions at the time that provided formal education to Africans under French colonial rule.

At Jeanne-d'Arc, Kamba was introduced to the musical and cultural practices of the French colonial elite as well as traditional Central African musical forms. This hybrid exposure would later shape his unique musical synthesis. After completing his education, he moved to Léopoldville (now Kinshasa), then part of the Belgian Congo, where he began working as a postal clerk. During his time in Léopoldville, Kamba developed an interest in music, particularly the guitar.

In 1932, at the age of 20, he returned to Brazzaville to take up administrative duties within the Department of Mines and Economic Affairs while continuing to refine his guitar technique and experiment with compositions. He was also active in Brazzaville's emerging sports scene, where he made a name for himself as a football referee. He officiated games at Stade Eboué, the city's central stadium, and was part of a community that saw sports and culture as intertwined aspects of civic life under colonial governance.

Kamba's entry into the local music scene began with his joining of the vocal group Bonne Espérance in 1935. The group had been formed in 1932 by Albert Loboko, an organist and former schoolmate of Kamba, along with Raymond Nguema, Joseph Botokoua, and Bernardin Yoka. Bonne Espérance quickly became a musical fixture in Brazzaville, as they performed regularly at notable local venues like "Chez Mamadou Moro" and the Cercle Culturel Catholique de Poto-Poto.

=== 1941–1948: Victoria Brazza ===
In August 1941, Paul Kamba founded what would become one of the most influential musical groups in Congolese history called Victoria Brazza. The band was initially formed with several standout musicians, including Henri Pali "Baudoin", Jacques Elenga "Eboma", Jean Oddet "Ekwaka", François Likundu, Moïse Dinga, Philippe Moukouami, Paul Monguele, François Lokwa, Paul Wonga, Joseph Bakale and Auguste Boukaka. Victoria Brazza's rhythm section featured a combination of traditional and Western instruments, such as the bass drum, patengué (a rectangular wooden tambourine), likembe (or sanza), accordion, guitar, mandolin, banjo, scraper, and bells. Over time, they welcomed many other musicians like Samuel Vemba, Hyppolite Ita, Australien Itoua, Atengana, Ebale Bonge, Raphaël Loulendo, Auguste Ngapela, Albert Ibela, Bertin Koutoupot, Jean Oba, Dominique Okongo, Gabriel Malanda, and Charles Mvoula. Though based in Brazzaville, they frequently performed in Léopoldville (now Kinshasa), where Kamba had many admirers.

In 1943, Kamba's close friendship with Wendo Kolosoy led to the creation of Victoria Kin in Léopoldville, which he modeled after Victoria Brazza. This band became a key outlet for Kamba's musical ideas throughout the Congo River region. Wendo, inspired by Kamba, grew into a lyrical and sensitive composer and eventually achieved fame with the 1948 hit "Marie Louise", which was recorded with Henri Bowane. Kamba's compositions and arrangements were also published in the cultural magazine Liaison.

Victoria Brazza was notable for including female vocalists, an unusually progressive choice at the time, with prominent voices including Gabrielle Maleka, Anne Mbassou, and Ibea. His contributions were further recognized through his recordings with Ngoma, one of the first Congolese labels. In 1948, he produced several landmark records, including "Victoria", "Marie Thérèse", "Catherine", "Victoria ya Maria", "Obela Mpoko", "Liwele Ya Paulo", "Djiguida", and "Masanga Fala".

== Death ==
Kamba died on 19 March 1950, at just 38 years old. His passing came only months before he was to travel to France for music training at a conservatory. He was survived by his wife, Gabrielle Maleka, whom he had married the previous year.

The news of his death was broadcast on Radio Brazzaville, and his funeral became a moment of national mourning. Musicians and fans from both Congos came to pay their respects. His death inspired several memorable tribute songs, including Wendo Kolosoy's "Polo Kamba Atiki Biso Na Mawa" and Antoine Moundanda's "Mabele Ya Polo".

In 1974, his remains were reinterred at Brazzaville's central cemetery by the UNEAC (National Union of Congolese Writers and Artists).

== Legacy ==
Paul Kamba's contributions have been honored over the decades through numerous tributes, symbolic gestures, and cultural programs. His remarkable body of work earned him the title of Knight of the Star of Benin from the French Republic. In 1953, a street in the Poto-Poto district of Brazzaville was named after him, thanks to efforts by unionist François Gandou. In 1981, the École Nationale des Beaux-Arts de Brazzaville was renamed École Paul Kamba. A major national music competition, named Challenge Paul Kamba, was organized in 2000 by the Congolese Ministry of Culture and Tourism, featuring over 45 amateur orchestras.

== Discography ==
All of Paul Kamba's recordings were released by the Ngoma label, still not reissued on CD or digital platforms.

- Victoria
- Marie-Thérèse
- Cathérine
- Victoria Ya Maria
- Obela Mpoko
- Liwele Ya Paul
- Djiguida
- Masanga Fala
