= Manuel d'Oliveira =

Angolan-born Congolese musician (1915–1988)

Manuel d'Olivera
- Born: Emmanuel Mayungu d'Oliveira; 10 October 1915; São Salvador (now M'banza-Kongo), Angola
- Origin: São Salvador
- Died: 12 January 1988 (aged 72) Luanda, Angola
- Genres: Polka Piké; Congolese rumba
- Occupations: Singer; songwriter; performer; guitarist
- Instruments: Guitar vocals
- Years active: 1930s–1980s
- Label: Ngoma
- Formerly of: San Salvador

Emmanuel Mayungu d'Oliveira (10 October 1915 – 12 January 1988), professionally known as Manuel d'Olivera, was an Angolan-born Congolese singer, songwriter, performer, guitarist, and bandleader. A seminal figure in Central African music, he is notably recognized for creating the "Polka Piké", a distinctive Bantu dance rhythm rooted in Kongo traditions. His musical career flourished in the 1950s, especially after signing with the Ngoma record label in 1948, under which he produced several notable hits—"Basi Banso Tapale", "Chérie Bondowe", "Elongi Ya Chérie", "Mwasi Kitoko Kulala Na Nkuala" and "Maria Tchebo".

Born in São Salvador (now M'banza-Kongo), Angola, d'Oliveira relocated to Matadi in the then-Belgian Congo at the age of six. Early on, he trained in carpentry and worked various jobs at the port of Matadi, but by the 1930s, he turned to music. He learned guitar from West African "Coastman" and "Krou Boys" who had been resettled in Léopoldville (modern-day Kinshasa) during World War II. In 1944, he founded the San Salvador group, which became known for its mastery of "Polka Piqué", a rhythm that complemented the emerging Congolese rumba sound.

In 1947, d'Oliveira moved to Léopoldville, where he learned Lingala and began performing in local bars and cabarets. His popularity grew rapidly, leading to his signing with Ngoma the following year. After Angola gained independence in 1975, d'Oliveira returned to his homeland in 1984. His contributions to Kongo culture were formally recognized by the Angolan government, which awarded him the Angolan Medal of Merit in 1987. He died in Luanda, Angola, on 12 January 1988.

== Life and career ==
=== 1915–1930s: Early life and career beginnings ===
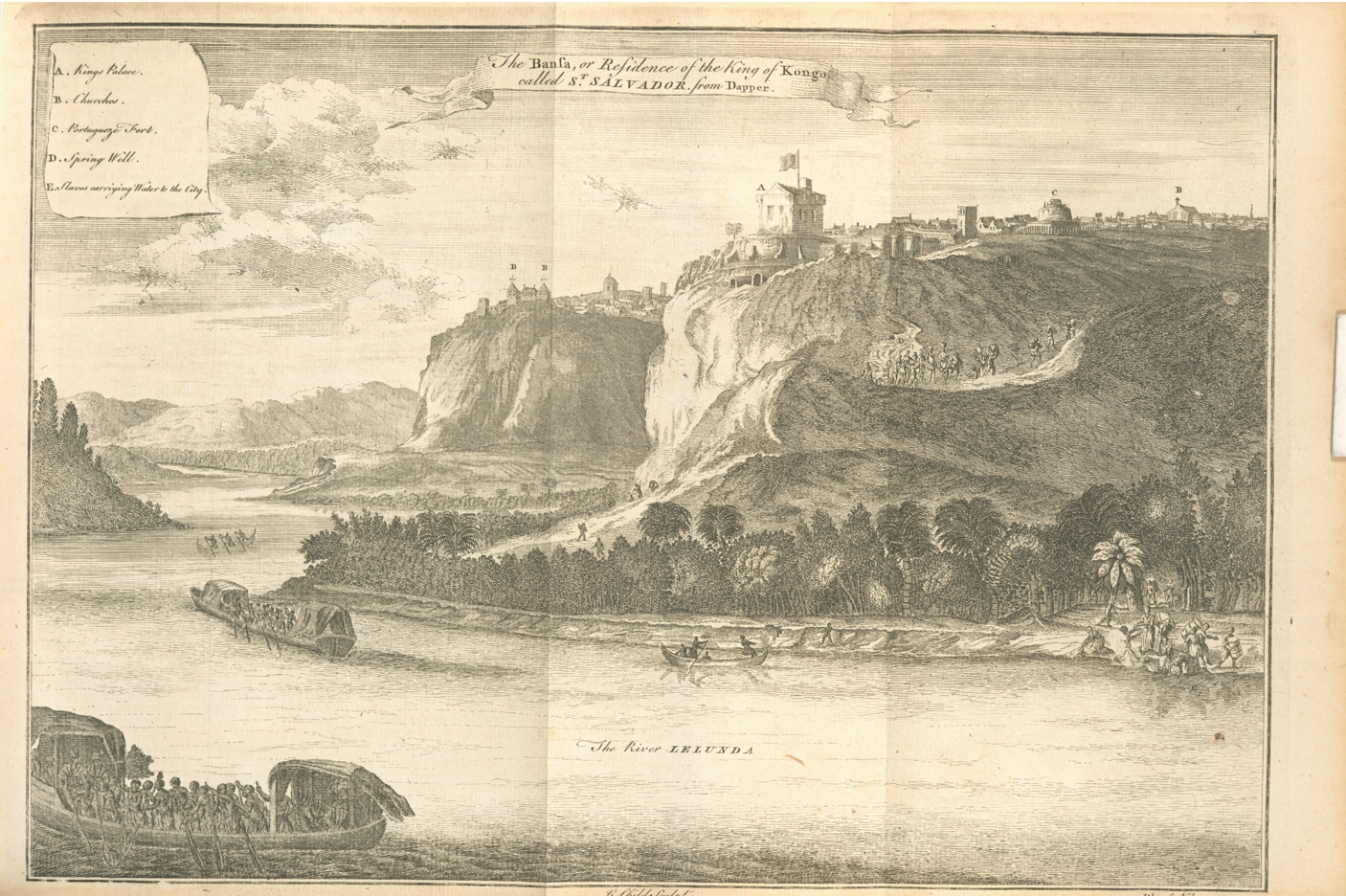
M'banza-Kongo (São Salvador) in 1745, the birthplace of Manuel d'Oliveira, served as the capital of the Kingdom of Kongo.

Emmanuel Mayungu d'Oliveira was born on 10 October 1915 in São Salvador (modern-day M'banza-Kongo) in northern Angola. He fathered five children, including four daughters and one son, and was also the grandfather of the famed solo guitarist Félix Manuaku Waku. In 1921, when he was six years old, his family fled the conflicts in Angola and settled in Matadi, Belgian Congo. After arriving there, d'Oliveira toiled as a laborer and longshoreman before building a career as a carpenter. While working, he developed an interest in music, inspired in part by French singers such as Tino Rossi and Luis Mariano.

According to Congolese musicologist Clément Ossinondé, d'Oliveira began learning the guitar at the age of 22. He first learned from a Belgian guitarist and later practiced with the "Coastmen" or "Krou Boys", who were West African sailors resettled in the region during the early stages of World War II to work in the newly established Belgian Congo factories. He became a skilled guitarist and began writing his first songs in Kikongo, and by 1937, he was fraternizing with young Angolan musicians and appearing at public events, where he became popular and earned a strong name in Matadi and Boma.

=== 1940s–1950s: Formation of San Salvador, relocation to Léopoldville and success with Ngoma ===
In 1944, d'Oliveira founded the musical group San Salvador in Matadi, named in homage to the historical capital of the Kingdom of Kongo. The group, composed of Edouard Bila, Henri Freitas, Georges Edouard Dula, and d'Oliveira as leader, specialized in the "Polka Piqué" style, a traditional Kongo dance style, which complemented the burgeoning Congolese rumba. Seeking better opportunities, San Salvador relocated to Léopoldville (now Kinshasa) in 1948, where d'Oliveira became part of the local music scene, learned Lingala, and began performing in bars and cabarets. His growing popularity attracted the attention of Greek producer Nico Jeronimidis, who then signed him to the Ngoma record label that same year. d'Oliveira's early recordings, performed in Kikongo, Lingala, and Portuguese, included hits like "Umbanzaga Moyo", "No Me Digas No", "Yoka Biso Ban 'Angola", "Maria Tchebo", "Mwasi Kitoko Kolala Na Nkuala", and "Elongi Ya Chérie Lokola Mwinda", many of which praised the beauty of Congolese women. Some of these recordings featured Belgian organist and producer Gilbert Warnant playing the Solovox. While at Ngoma, d'Oliveira also teamed up with Léon Bukasa and Antoine Wendo Kolosoy to form Trio BOW (Bukasa, d'Oliveira, Wendo), and recorded the hits "Bibi Wangu Madeleine", "Victoria Apiki Drapeau", and "Sango Ya Bana Ngoma", among others.

Between 1948 and 1952, d'Oliveira recorded a series of popular hits with the Ngoma label. Some of his notable recordings from this period include "Muasi kitoko akolala na nkuala"/"Maria Tchebo", "Basi Banso Tapale"/"Mama Abuti Biso", "Na Angola Basi Bazali Mingi"/"Ticketébungi", "Meno Nluta Kwame"/"Avo Se Mokema Ya Ndumba", "Mbula Ya Sala Kwame"/"Umbanzanga", "Ozola Yela"/"Ndumba Yadisompa Kwame", "Omambu Yavangwa"/"Okuntadilanga Ne Kunzeyeko," "Elisa Muasi Kitoko Moyibi"/"Basi Na Kinshasa Botiaki Tembe", "Mbamba Solo Olingi Naboma"/"Elongi Ya Chérie Lokola Mwinda", and "Bana Boma"/"Kifunga Ntumbu Ya Mulenda". Other songs include "Bino Banso Yoka Toyemba"/ "Obango Filomèhe", "Edumbanga Yabondela"/"Mono Kwenda Kwame Nkwenda Kwame", "Yo Mobali Ya Tembe"/"Ata Nasali Yo Boni", "Otoko Mpene Eblondia"/"Omono I Djoko", "Nutul'omwiwi"/"Mu Léo Kwenda", "Biguini, Biguini"/"Ayi Olele", "Djibola Ngoma"/"Gabi-Gabi Eyamba", "Djole Nwaba"/"Ngai Na Boyi", and "Tin Tin"/"Boni Boni Muana Oyo".

=== 1960s–1980s: Anthologie de la Musique Zaïroise Moderne Vol. 2, and final years ===
In 1973, d'Oliveira participated in the Anthologie de la Musique Zaïroise Moderne Vol. 2, a double album produced by Papa Noël Nedule under the auspices of President Mobutu Sese Seko's Authenticité cultural policy. The project also featured other legends of Congolese rumba, including Antoine Wendo Kolosoy, Camille Feruzi, Léon Bukasa, Lucie Eyenga Moseka, and Adou Elenga. Following Angola's independence in 1975, d'Oliveira, driven by a sense of nostalgia, returned to his homeland in 1984 to spend his final years. In 1987, he was honored with the Angolan Medal of Merit for his longstanding contributions to the preservation and celebration of Kongo culture. His song "Ticket Ebunga" reflects his experience of prolonged exile.

== Death ==
Manuel d'Oliveira died on 12 January 1988 in Luanda, Angola, at the age of 72. It is rumored that he may have been poisoned, possibly due to resentment over his past achievements and the fact that he was unable to establish his career in his home country. He was reportedly insulted by the "Luandais", who referred to him as a "Zairian", a term used derogatorily to describe Angolans from the Democratic Republic of the Congo.

== Discography ==
After a career spanning close to 44 years, d'Oliveira's body of work included over a hundred songs, many of which became major hits. Below is a selection of 38 standout tracks from 1948 to 1952, recorded with Ngoma, through which he rose to legendary status and became a cornerstone of Congolese music.

- 110 – "Muasi Kitoko Akolala Na Nkuala"/"Maria Tchebo"
- 111 – "Basi Banso Tapale"/"Mama Abuti Biso"
- 112 – "Na Angola Basi Bazali Mingi"/"Ticketébungi"
- 113 – "Meno Nluta Kwame"/"Avo Se Mokema Ya Ndumba"
- 114 – "Mbula Ya Sala Kwame"/"Umbanzanga"
- 115 – "Ozola Yela"/"Ndumba Yadisompa Kwame"
- 116 – "Omambu Yavangwa"/"Okuntadilanga Ne Kunzeyeko"
- 117 – "Elisa Muasi Kitoko Moyibi"/"Basi Na Kinshasa Botiaki Tembe"
- 118 – "Mbamba Solo Olingi Naboma"/"Elongi Ya Chérie Lokola Mwinda"
- 119 – "Bana Boma"/"Kifunga Ntumbu Ya Mulenda"
- 131 – "Bino Banso Yoka Toyemba"/"Obango Filomèhe"
- 132 – "Edumbanga Yabondela"/"Mono Kwenda Kwame Nkwenda Kwame"
- 212 – "Yo Mobali Ya Tembe"/"Ata Nasali Yo Boni"
- 213 – "Otoko Mpene Eblondia"/"Omono I Djoko"
- 214 – "Nutul'Omwiwi"/"Mu Léo Kwenda"
- 241 – "Biguini, Biguini"/"Ayi Olele"
- 379 – "Djibola Ngoma"/"Gabi-Gabi Eyamba"
- 380 – "Djole Nwaba"/"Ngai Na Boyi"
- 1095 – "Tin Tin"/"Boni Boni Muana Oyo"
