= Paul Mwanga =

Angolan musician

- Birth name: Paul Munania
- Also known as: Mwanga Paul
- Born: 1932; Angola
- Died: 2016 (aged 83–84)
- Genres: Congolese rumba
- Occupation: Singer-songwriter
- Instrument: Vocals

Paul Mwanga (1932–2016) was a vocalist and composer. He was one of the early pioneers of Congolese rumba. He was born in Angola.

In 1944, when modern Congolese music was only in its earliest days, Paul Mwanga's music gained popular review among the local public. He began his career working in the company of seminal greats such as Wendo, and recorded a number of hits on the Opika Label teaming up with famous "Hawaiian" style guitarist Jhimmy (Zacharie Elenga).

Around 1950 or 1951 Nicolas Kasanda, later to be popularly known as Docteur Nico, made his debut singing behind Paul Mwanga.

In 1958 Mwanga signed to the young recording label Ngoma, which began a new period for him where his fame reached its height for his career. At the time he was one of the principal artists recording in the language Kikongo.

Mwanga died in 2016. Shortly before that, he took part in Alan Brain's documentary The Rumba Kings, released in 2021.
