= Roberto Pla =

- Born: Roberto Enrique Pla García; February 13, 1947 (age 79); Barranquilla, Colombia
- Genres: Salsa, descarga, Latin jazz, Latin pop
- Occupations: Musician, composer, bandleader
- Instruments: Timbales, drum kit, hand percussion
- Years active: 1964–present
- Label: Tumi Music

Roberto Pla (born February 13, 1947) is a Colombian percussionist and bandleader based in London, England. Primarily a timbalero, he is best known for his contribution to the Latin music scene in the United Kingdom. He has toured with Carlos "Patato" Valdés, Alfredo Rodríguez and Adalberto Santiago, among others.

== Life and career ==
=== Early life ===
Roberto Pla was born in Barranquilla on Colombia's Northern Atlantic coast, a tropical area rich in music and folklore. As a boy, he studied percussion with Pompilio Rodriguez, at that time one of Colombia's greatest percussionists. In 1964, he left Barranquilla for Bogota the country's capital, and while he was there he became an active session musician playing with some of the best bands in his country including Los Ocho De Colombia. From 1968–78 he played drum kit with Orchestra Lucho Bermudez, Colombia's leading Big Band, and national institution with whom he toured Latin America and the United States, recorded numerous albums and appeared weekly on Colombian television.

=== New York and London ===
In 1979, Pla left Colombia for New York, where he became a busy salsa session percussionist working with, amongst others, Orchestra La Tradition. In 1980 the attractions of the European pop scene drew him to London, where he joined the jazz fusion band Cayenne and Latin funksters Gonzalez (world tour) and, by 1982, he was touring the world with pop megastars Boney M. In 1984, he was one of the earliest members of the London School of Samba, the first samba school to be set up in the UK. Since then, Pla has been a resident in the UK. Artists that he has played and toured with include Joe Strummer (ex-Clash) with whom he featured in the French film I Hired a Contract Killer, Caribbean Soca artist Arrow (US tour), Spanish pop band Radio Futura, Japanese duo The Frank Chickens, and rock heavyweights Motörhead (with whom he featured in the film Eat the Rich). In 1987, he toured Japan and the far east with Slim Gaillard, and performed in North Africa with Cuban pianist Alfredo Rodriguez. He has also recorded for Kate Bush and M People. In 1992, he toured Europe and America with Virgin Records-signed Sonny Southton. In summer 1993, he toured Europe with Blue Note Records-signed rap act US 3, Fania Allstars' vocalist Adalberto Santiago and Azuquita. In 1998, he toured Europe with Sidestepper and the Newyorican Poets, and in November 1999, toured China with Trevor Watts’ Moire Music. In September/ October 2000, Pla toured Canada, USA and Latin America with Watts. In 2009, Pla played with the Ronnie Scott Allstars Orchestra conducted by Peter Long with special guest the American trumpeter John Faddis. In 2010, Pla guested with Jazz At The Lincoln Centre Orchestra led by Wynton Marsalis at The Barbican Centre in London. Pla is also a regular member of Gillespiana, an all-star big band featuring British session musicians. In 2011, Pla performed at the Southbank's Vintage Festival (R.F.H.) where he performed in the orchestra conducted by Sid Gauld backing acts including Adam Ant, Sandie Shaw and The Christians.

In 1991, the band released a track on The Freedom From Debt CD (WDM Records). In 1993, they received a bursary from the Arts Council of Great Britain to tour the UK and, in Autumn 1993, they toured the far east. In 1995, recorded a follow up CD for Tumi Records and a further release in 1997. In 1996, the band participated in the Salsa Legends Tour, featuring, among others, Azuquita on vocals as a special guest, plus Alfredo Rodriguez on piano. Justo Almario on tenor saxophone, and also Steve Turre on trombone. Other Latin musicians that the Latin Ensemble have accompanied in the UK and Europe include Cheo Feliciano, Marvin Santiago, Tito Allen, Pedro Arroyo and Tito Gomez.

=== Recent years ===
Recent major live highlights for Roberto Pla and the Latin Ensemble have been Brecon Jazz Festival(2007), Expo Festival Lisbon, The Edinburgh Fringe Festival (2009), Canada Square Festival (Canary Wharf, Docklands. (2009), Under the Stars Festival (2010), Jazz at The Boisdale (Canary Wharf), Ronnie Scotts Club (Dec. 2011). In April 2012 the band celebrated their 25th anniversary with a concert at the Assembly Hall in Islington and won their first LUKAS award for 'Lifetime Achievement and contribution to the Latino Community in the UK'. In June 2013, Pla and his Latin Ensemble headlined the 'Glasto Latino Stage' at Glastonbury Festival and subsequently won their second LUKAS for 'Concert of the year' in spring 2014. In August 2017, Pla performed at the Royal Albert Hall as a special guest on "BBC Prom 57: Swing No End" led by Claire Teal and conducted by Guy Barker.

== Bands ==
Pla was a founder member of the UK's first Salsa band Valdez. He was also the Co-founder of UK salsa band Sonido De Londres who recorded two albums. In 1986, PLa founded his own 12 piece all-star band: the Roberto Pla Latin Ensemble who since have made numerous European Festival and TV appearances.
