= Wendo Kolosoy =

Congolese singer and musician (1925–2008)

- The cover of his last record, Banaya Papa Wendo

Background information
- Also known as: Papa Wendo; Wendo; Wendo Sor; Sor; Wendo Alanga Nzembo; Wendo Mokonzi ya Nzembo
- Born: Antoine Kalosoyi (var. Nkolosoy); 25 April 1925; Mushie, Mai-Ndombe District, Belgian Congo
- Origin: Kinshasa, Democratic Republic of the Congo
- Died: 28 July 2008 (aged 83) Kinshasa, Democratic Republic of the Congo
- Genres: Congolese rumba; world music
- Occupations: Singer; songwriter; guitarist; band leader
- Instruments: Vocals, guitar
- Years active: 1940s–2000s
- Labels: Ngoma; Editions Flash
- Formerly of: Victoria Kin; Orchestre Afrisa International; Victoria Bakolo Miziki

Antoine Wendo Kolosoy (25 April 1925 – 28 July 2008), better known as Papa Wendo, Wendo Sor, or mononymously Wendo, was a Congolese singer-songwriter, guitarist, and bandleader. Often called by some contemporaries as the "father of Congolese rumba", Wendo pioneered a musical idiom distinguished by his self-accompaniment on guitar, whether as a soloist or in the company of a small ensemble, before drawing in 1943 upon the pioneering example of his contemporary Paul Kamba. His stardom was so pervasive that the music of his era became known colloquially as Tango ya ba Wendo ("the time of Wendo"). He sang in Nkundo, Lingala, and Swahili, with lyrics that often explored themes of travel, solitude, youthful nostalgia, lost loves, and feminine beauty. His style was distinctive for its raspy, resonant voice, playful use of onomatopoeia, high-pitched inflections, and cooing embellishments.

Wendo began his career as a riverboat worker before devoting himself to music in the 1940s. He recorded with the Ngoma label in collaboration with Manuel d'Oliveira and Léon Bukasa, later joined by Zacharie Elenga and Paul Mwanga following the decline of the Opika label. In 1943, he formed the band Victoria Kin, modeled on Paul Kamba's Victoria Brazza. Among its notable titles was "Victoria apiki dalapo", which contributed to his rising reputation. In 1948, he achieved continental acclaim with "Marie Louise", co-written with Henri Bowane, which became the first major pan-African hit and also provoked controversy with colonial authorities, leading to Wendo's temporary excommunication and exile in Kisangani.

Throughout his long career, Wendo played a central role in shaping Congolese rumba. He recorded extensively with Ngoma until 1953, later co-founding Trio BOW with Bukasa and d'Oliveira, before experiencing a revival in 1966 when Tabu Ley Rochereau reissued his early works on the Flash label. That same year, he toured Europe with Tabu Ley's band Orchestre Afrisa International and, upon returning in 1967, left the band. In 1973, he contributed to the state-sponsored compilation album Anthologie de la Musique Zaïroise Moderne, produced by Papa Noël Nedule, and re-emerged in prominence through the popular radio program Bakolo Miziki, hosted by Mama Angebi and Mama Kanzaku, which provided him the opportunity to form the band Victoria Bakolo Miziki. His later career included patriotic recordings such as "Tokufa po na Congo" and "Franc Congolais".

== Life and career ==
=== Early life and origins of the name "Wendo" ===
Wendo was born on 25 April 1925 in Mushie Territory, Mai-Ndombe District of western Congo, then under Belgian colonial rule. He was the son of Jules Lutuli, an Ekonda soldier, and Albertine Bolumbu, a Nkundo. His birthname was Antoine Kalosoyi (also spelled Nkalasoy or Nkolosoyi), which he eventually regularized to Kolosoy.

The stage name Wendo has its origins in an incident during a performance at the Kongo Bar in Léopoldville (now Kinshasa), where Wendo played before Belgian colonists. The Governor-General, Léon Antoine Marie Pétillon, remarked that "when Antoine Nkalasoy marks his rhythm, he bounces like the shock absorbers of the English car brand 'Duke of Windsor'". The comment spread quickly across Kinshasa and the Congo, and Nkalasoy was soon nicknamed the "Duke of Windsor". Through linguistic distortion, this became Wendo Sor, and eventually shortened to simply Wendo, which supplanted his birth name and accompanied him throughout his career.

=== Childhood and occupations ===
Kolosoy lost his father at the age of seven and was later raised by his mother, who was herself a singer and often performed using a traditional instrument known as the Mukwasa (the scraper). Before her death, she entrusted the instrument to him and instructed him to make use of it. He began playing the guitar and performing at the age of eleven. Following her death when Wendo was nine years old, he was placed in an orphanage operated by the Society of the Missionaries of Africa, and remained there until he was 12 or 13, but was later expelled when the fathers disapproved of the lyrics of his songs.

Although music would eventually define his career, Wendo initially pursued a variety of occupations. He worked as a boxer, sailor, and longshoreman in the Belgian Congo, Cameroon, and Senegal. At the age of thirteen, he began traveling as a boatman (greaser) with the Office des Transports Coloniaux (OTRACO), later known as ONATRA and today as the Société Commerciale des Transports et des Ports (SCTP). He was also employed by the Mbila Company and another enterprise referenced by Congolese music journalist Jeannot Ne Nzau Diop as "huilerie Heb", likely a misrendering of Huileries du Congo Belge. The musicologist Clément Ossinondé recorded that Wendo served aboard the steamer Luxembourg, which traversed the Kasaï and Congo Rivers. In his spare hours, he would sit on deck, guitar in hand, performing songs inspired by the vocal traditions of the riverside communities along the Kasaï and Congo.

=== Victoria Kin ===
In the early 1940s, he began playing guitar around the capital Kinshasa, where he accompanied himself on guitar or performed with two or three musicians, using an arrangement comparable to that of the Cuban Trio Matamoros of the 1920s. In 1943, inspired by the considerable fame of Paul Kamba's Victoria Brazza on both banks of the Congo River, Wendo decided to establish his first band in Kinshasa. The band, named Victoria Kin, was modeled on Kamba's band and signaled Wendo's transition from solo performance to band leadership. The band recorded with Ngoma and other Congolese labels, performing a repertoire composed and arranged largely by Wendo himself. Their music incorporated formal elements of emerging modern styles while retaining the simplicity and elegance of Congolese rumba forms. The band's success owed much to the distinctive timbre of Wendo's voice and to the talents of its members: François Ngombe Boteko (Me Taureau), Bongeli, Bape, and Tango. Victoria Kin also worked closely with an animation troupe of young women known as La Reine Politesse, directed by the prominent Brazzaville dancer Germaine Ngongolo, who, active in women's associations at the bar-dancing venue Chez Faïgnond during the 1950s and 1960s, played a decisive role in amplifying the band's visibility and popularity.

Wendo's influence grew further in 1946 with the installation of public loudspeakers by Radio Congolia in Léopoldville, which broadcast his music widely and facilitated his entry into phonographic recording with the city's first record label, Olympia. Around the same period, Wendo and Paul Kamba developed a close professional relationship, performing together in Kinshasa and Brazzaville to the delight of audiences in the two capitals. From 1946 onward, Wendo resided at No. 31, Avenue de la Croix Rouge in Barumbu, Kinshasa, where he honed his distinctive guitar style and earned recognition as one of the poet-musicians of his generation. The partnership between Victoria Brazza and Victoria Kin was particularly influential, as both bands navigated the rapidly evolving musical landscape of the late 1940s and showcased their innovations in instrumentation and rhythm in recordings made for Ngoma beginning in 1948. That same year marked a decisive turning point in Wendo's career when, while traveling upriver toward Stanleyville (now Kisangani), he encountered guitarist Henri Bowane in Coquilhatville (now Mbandaka). Bowane became a musical partner and a mentor, bringing Wendo back to Kinshasa and performing alongside him during evenings and weekends. During Wendo's absence on one voyage, Bowane met the Greek merchant and publisher Nicolas Jéronimidis, who had established the Ngoma label in 1948. Impressed by Bowane's guitar playing, Jéronimidis invited him to join the roster of Ngoma musicians. Bowane, however, insisted that the true talent was his "elder brother" Wendo, then away on the river. Upon Wendo's return aboard a scheduled steamer, he was welcomed at the port by Bowane and Jéronimidis, the latter arriving in his opulent Douglas automobile. This encounter launched his professional career as a musician. He formally joined Ngoma in 1948, where his lyrical vocal style quickly distinguished him within the label's catalogue.

==== "Marie-Louise" ====
His first international hit, in 1948, was "Marie-Louise", which was co-written with guitarist Henri Bowane. Issued as a 78 rpm disc, the record featured "Marie-Louise" on the A-side and "Botiaki Tembe" on the B-side. According to those close to Wendo, Marie-Louise was his beloved and also Bowane's sister. In the song, Wendo declares his determination to marry her despite fierce opposition from his would-be father-in-law, who disparaged and maligned him. The refrain states: "Solo mpenza ngai na kobala Louise. Bokilo aboya, ngai na yo se libala, ngai na yo tolingani", which translates as: "It is certain that I will marry you, Louise. Even if the father-in-law refuses, you and I will wed, for our love binds us". Wendo himself later clarified to Radio France Internationale that the song was in fact written as a playful gesture of gratitude to Bowane's sister, who regularly welcomed the two musicians for meals.

Musicologist Mampouya Mam'sy, in Cours de musique congolaise, notes that "Marie-Louise" employs homophony, with Wendo's lead line supported by instrumental accompaniment. His vocals are woven against Bowane's guitar, whose nimble fingering transposed traditional Mongo rhythms onto a modern instrument. The interplay between Bowane's guitar and Wendo's vocals creates an aural illusion of two guitars conversing, when in fact it is a single instrument. Promoted widely through Radio Congolia, the song rapidly swept across West Africa. However, its success also stirred turmoil, as Catholic clergy denounced it as "satanic", with rumors circulating that it possessed occult powers and, if played at midnight, could summon the dead. The uproar eventually forced Wendo into exile from Kinshasa, landed him briefly in a Belgian colonial prison in Stanleyville, and even led to his excommunication from the Catholic Church. Nevertheless, "Marie-Louise" became the "first pan-African musical work" and established Wendo as a Congolese rumba national star. Beyond the controversy, "Marie-Louise" is also credited with popularizing the sebene, the instrumental break that became central to Congolese rumba. According to the Agence d'Information d'Afrique Centrale, the term sebene first emerged to describe Bowane's improvisations in this very recording, though later generations mistakenly attributed its origin to the band Zaïko Langa Langa.

=== Congolese popular music ===
Cover of the 1996 re-issue of Ngoma's early singles, including "Marie-Louise". Wendo is pictured, c. 1950, in the center, in front of the Ngoma touring van.

Wendo's success rested upon the burgeoning radio stations and record industry of late colonial Leopoldville, which often piped music over loudspeakers into the African quarters, called the "Cite". A handful of African clubs (closing early with a 9:30PM curfew for non-Europeans) like "Congo Bar" provided venues, along with occasional gigs at the upscale white clubs of the European quarter, "La ville". The importation of European and American 78 rpm records into Africa in the 1930s and 1940s (called G.V. Series records) featured much Cuban music, a style that was enjoyed by cosmopolitan Europeans and Africans alike. One writer has argued that this music, sophisticated, based on Africa music, and not produced by white colonialists especially appealed to Africans in general, and newly urban Congolese in particular. Greek and Lebanese merchants, a fixture in colonial Francophone Africa were amongst the first to bring recording and record pressing equipment to tropical Africa. Jéronimidis' Ngoma record label was one of the first and most successful, and Wendo was his star artist. Jéronimidis, Wendo, and other musicians, barnstormed around Belgian Congo in a brightly painted Ngoma van, performing and selling records. The music culture this created not only propelled Congolese rumba to fame, but began to develop a national culture for the first time.

==== 1950s ====
The "Trio Bow" recording of "Akeyi Na Zandu" (1956) on the Ngoma record label. Wendo, Léon Bukasa and Manuel d'Oliveira, stars individually, were combined into this supergroup in 1955 by Nicolas Jéronimidis.

Due to a dispute over his rights, Wendo was dismissed from the Ngoma label in 1953. In 1955, Wendo, along with two other singer/guitarists (Léon Bukasa and Manuel d'Oliveira) formed an all-star orchestra known as the "Trio BOW", recording new variations on the rumba and other dance music for Ngoma, with hits such as "Sango ya bana Ngoma", "Victoria apiki dalapo", "Bibi wangu Madeleine", "Yoka biso ban'Angola", and "Landa bango". Although he never achieved comparable international success similar to that of Papa Wemba or Zaïko Langa Langa, he played throughout Africa, Europe and the US and is recognized as one of the fathers of modern African music and an elder statesman of Congolese rumba. In reviewing the recent film on Wendo, a writer in the Kinshasa daily Le Potentiel wrote that "One cannot speak of modern music without evoking the name of Wendo Kolosoy". Congolese rumba musicians who have come after him have referred to the 1940s and 1950s as "Tango ya ba Wendo" ("The Era of Wendo" in Lingala).

==== Retirement and revival (1960s–1990s) ====
At the height of his career, Wendo developed friendships with several figures who would later become central to Congolese independence, most notably Patrice Lumumba. The assassination of Prime Minister Lumumba in 1961, followed by the rise to power of Lieutenant General Mobutu Sese Seko in 1965, led Wendo to withdraw from politics, music, and public life. He expressed disillusionment with the way music was increasingly appropriated for political purposes and decided to stop performing.

"Because political men at the time wanted to use musicians like stepping stones. That is to say, they wanted musicians to sing their favors. Me, I did not want to do that. That's why I decided it was best for me, Wendo, to pull myself out of the music scene, and stay home".

After a prolonged silence, Wendo's earlier recordings were revived in 1966 when Tabu Ley Rochereau reissued his hits on the Flash label. He subsequently joined Tabu Ley's band, Orchestre Afrisa International, with whom he toured Europe. After returning to Kinshasa in 1967, however, Wendo departed from the band. In 1973, he contributed to the double album Anthologie de la Musique Zaïroise Moderne, produced by Papa Noël Nedule under President Mobutu's Authenticité cultural program, and he later performed at several international festivals, including those in Berlin, Paris, and Brussels. Nevertheless, his career began to wane during the 1970s, a decline noted by Dieumerci Monga Monduka of Le Potentiel. To preserve his legacy, President Mobutu appointed him to the music division of the Congolese National Theatre Company (Compagne Théâtre National Congolais). Though his public appearances became infrequent thereafter, each appearance stood out for his striking white hair, distinctive voice, expressive dance movements, and retro style of dress. Between 1972 and 1980, he also appeared in the radio program Bakolo Miziki, hosted by Mama Angebi and Mama Kanzaku, which provided the occasion for him to form the band Victoria Bakolo Miziki, marking his return to the musical stage.

In 1993, he recorded the album Nani Akolela Wendo? for the Belgian label Franc'Amour. He was honored at the inaugural edition of the Pan-African Music Festival (FESPAM) in 1996, and following the accession of Laurent-Désiré Kabila in 1997, his career underwent significant revival. Backed by the reconstituted Victoria Bakolo Miziki and his troupe of backup dancers known as the "Dancing Grannies", Wendo toured extensively across Africa and Europe, regaining audiences in a manner often compared to the success of the Buena Vista Social Club and Orchestra Baobab. Original members of Victoria Bakolo Miziki who rejoined the band included Antoine Moundanda (thumb piano), Joseph Munange (saxophone), Mukubuele Nzoku (guitar), and Alphonse Biolo Batilangandi (trumpet). Wendo also returned to prominence through his participation in patriotic recordings such as "Tokufa po na Congo" ("We die for Congo") and "Franc Congolais" (1998).

His international re-emergence culminated with an invitation to perform at the fourth Marché des Arts du Spectacle Africain (MASA) in Abidjan in 1999, where he recorded new material in collaboration with producer Christian Mousset and the French label Label Bleu. That year he released the album Marie Louise, a ten-track collection rooted in Congolese rumba that reinterpreted several of his earlier compositions from the 1940s and 1950s. Reviews in Africultures described his voice as deeper and more textured, "hoarse yet smooth", punctuated by playful vocal mannerisms tinged with melancholy humor. The album included tributes such as "Pépé Kalé", honoring the singer who had died the previous year, and "Tokutani", an improvised duet with Cameroonian singer Anne-Marie Nzié, recorded in a single take. The album was reissued in 2000 on Indigo, a sub-label of Label Bleu. In 1999, he also released Amba, reissued internationally in 2002, whose title track recalls the tale of a "mysterious woman who gave birth to twins" and implored Wendo to immortalize her name in song. On the album he was joined again by Antoine Moundanda.

=== Later life and death ===
In 2000, Wendo toured Europe and the United States, and in 2003, he appeared at Ronnie Scott's Jazz Club in London, accompanied by an eight-piece lineup of Victoria Bakolo Miziki composed of veteran and younger musicians. His final public performance took place in Kinshasa in 2004. His last recordings include Banaya Papa Wendo (IglooMondo, 2007) and contributions to The Very Best of Congolese Rumba – The Kinshasa-Abidjan Sessions (2007), alongside Antoine Moundanda and the Rumbanella Band. Also in 2007, Jacques Sarasin released the documentary On the Rumba River, chronicling Wendo's career, following earlier documentation in Tango Ya Ba Wendo (1992) by Roger Kwami Zinga and Mirko Popovitch.

Wendo's health deteriorated in 2005, forcing him to withdraw from public life. That year, he was hospitalized in Barumbu, Kinshasa, in an improvised medical facility following a health crisis attributed to overexertion. Lacking the resources for appropriate medical care, Wendo publicly expressed feelings of abandonment by state authorities and fellow musicians, appealing for solidarity and assistance. He noted that although President Laurent-Désiré Kabila had once given him a vehicle, he had never been provided a home. Wendo died on 28 July 2008 at Ngaliema Clinic in Ngaliema, Kinshasa. His funeral, held on 3 August, drew thousands of mourners, including state dignitaries, musicians, and admirers. His body lay in state at the esplanade of the Stade des Martyrs, where tributes and performances honored his legacy. Former Minister of Culture Philémon Mukendi eulogized Wendo as "a resister, a patriot, and a unifier of Congolese musical generations". Mukendi emphasized Wendo's role in offering cultural resistance under colonial rule, his refusal to participate in Mobutu's personality cult, and his patriotic decision to resume music after the regime's collapse.

== Discography ==
- Nani Akolela Wendo? (1993, Franc'Amour)
- Marie Louise (1999, Label Bleu; reissued 2000, Indigo/Label Bleu)
- Amba (1999, Marimbi 46801.2; reissued 2002, Marimbi/World Village; reissued 2003, World Village 468012)
- On the Rumba River (2007, Marabi/Harmonia Mundi 46822.2) – soundtrack to Jacques Sarasin's documentary of the same title
- Banaya Papa Wendo (2007, IglooMondo)

=== Compilations ===
- Anthologie de la Musique Zaïroise Moderne (1973) — Papa Noël Nedule was commissioned by the office of the President of the Republic of Zaire, Mobutu Sese Seko, to produce, within the framework of the Authenticité cultural policy promoted by the regime, the double album.
- Ngoma: The Early Years, 1948-1960 Popular African Music (1996). Includes the original recording of "Marie-Louise", 1948 (Antoine Kolosoy "Wendo"/Henri Bowane)
- The Very Best of Congolese Rumba - The Kinshasa-Abjijan Sessions (2007, Marabi Productions)
- The Rough Guide to Congo Gold (2008, World Music Network 1200)
- Beginners Guide To Africa—Nascente BX13 (2006)

== Bibliography ==
- Gary Stewart (2000). Rumba on the River: A History of the Popular Music of the Two Congos. Verso. ISBN 1-85984-368-9.
