= Indubil =

Slang spoken in the Democratic Republic of the Congo

Indubil is a slang spoken in the Democratic Republic of the Congo. It has been noted since around the sixties - musician Sam Mangwana mentions its use in lyrics before the seventies. Indubil was originally rooted in Lingala but in its continued evolution it has given birth to Kindubile, the youth with the language in Katanga which uses Swahili as its matrix language.

As of 2010, Indubil is a lively slang and continues to evolve.
