= Tumi Music =

- Founded: 1983
- Founder: Mo Fini
- Distributor: Discovery Records (In the U.K.)
- Genre: World music
- Country of origin: U.K.
- Official website: Official website of Tumi Music

Tumi Music is a UK independent record label well known for its Latin American (mainly Cuban), Peruvian music, and pan pipe music.

Famous for releasing the CD Lamento Negro (2001) that won the Latin Grammy Award for Best Folk Album for Susana Baca in 2002.

== Artists ==
- Afro Cuban All Stars
- Andy Gola
- Aragon (musician)
- Buena Vista Social Club
- Candido Fabre
- Celina Gonzalez
- Chucho Valdés
- Elio Revé
- Felix Baloy
- Jamelao
- Los Kjarkas
- Omara Portuondo
- Papa Noel (musician)
- Roberto Pla
- Son 14
- To’Mezclao
- Yusa

== See also ==
- Lists of record labels
- List of independent UK record labels
