= Instrumental idiom =

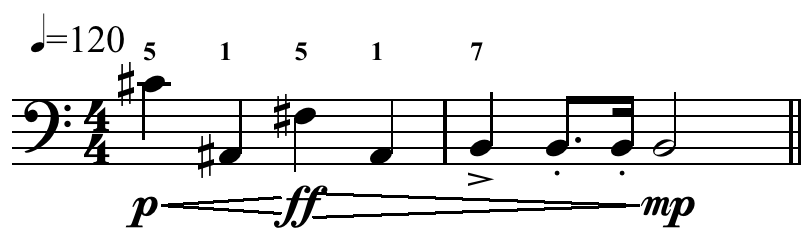
Non-idiomatic trombone part. Slide positions above the score indicate the large and swift change from the first to higher and then the highest positions required.

In music, an instrumental idiom refers to writing, parts, and performance, those being idiomatic or nonidiomatic depending on how well each is suited to the specific instrument intended, in terms of both ease of playing and quality of music and the inherent tendencies and limitations of specific instruments. The analogy is with linguistic idiomaticness, that is, form or structure peculiar to one language but not another.

For example, the trombone is played with a slide, making it one of the few wind instruments capable of glissando or sliding. However, pitches are different harmonics from the harmonic series on different slide positions. Thus, in the lower range, significant movement of the slide is required between positions, but for higher notes the player need only use the first four positions of the slide since the partials are closer together, allowing higher notes to be played in alternate positions. As an example, F4 (at the bottom of the treble clef) may be played in first, fourth or sixth position on a standard B♭ trombone.

There are cross-instrument guidelines. For example, it is difficult to begin playing very quietly in the upper or lower range of some instruments (it taking more energy to produce sound), with tone quality and/or intonation often suffering. Use of extended techniques and writing in or beyond the highest or lowest range is not recommended, especially for student ensembles, unless writing for a specific performer.

== Idiomatic compositional constraints ==
There are a few notable examples of idiomatic instrumental constraints affecting compositional choices found in written music. For example, in the final movement of Ravel's Piano Concerto in G Major, the final note played in the bass voice of the piano sounds an A0, rather than what would be the tonic G0. This is most likely due to the piano's lowest note being A0 rather than G0, which does not exist on a standard piano. Ravel also makes a similar choice in a climactic moment in Jeux d'eau, ending a falling gesture again on A0, rather than G#0 due to the limitations of the instrument. Ravel also employs using A0 to begin the third presentation of the rising motive in the opening of the third movement Gaspard de la nuit when the motive is played down the octave. The ending of Bax's 4th Piano Sonata written in the key of G major also ends with a low A0 in the bass voice.

In the Finale to Tchaikovsky's Fifth Symphony, the violins begin the initial melody, though do not complete the melody when it descends to the low E, which is sounded by the violas. A similar continuation of the melody by the violas due to the limitations of the violin's range occurs in the final movement of Saint-Saëns' 3rd violin concerto.

== See also ==
- Musical tuning
- Extended technique
