= Henri Bowane =

Congolese guitarist and singer (1926–1992)

- Born: Henri Wa Mayani Bowane; 1926; Belgian Congo
- Died: 1992 (65–66 years) Zaire
- Genres: Congolese rumba
- Occupations: Musician, songwriter
- Instrument: Electric guitar
- Years active: 1947–1992
- Labels: Essiebons, Ryco Jazz

Henri Bowane (1926–1992) was an influential figure in the development of Congolese rumba in the modern-day Democratic Republic of the Congo. He was the first professional boss and early mentor to the guitarist Franco Luambo.

== Early career ==
Bowane rose to prominence in Leopoldville's music scene during the late 1940s in which Cuban style music combined with Lingala and pan-Congolese styles. A guitarist, singer and bandleader, Bowane was paired with singer-guitarist Wendo Kolosoy by the Ngoma records. Ngoma was founded by Nicolas Jéronimidis and his brother, Greek businessmen based in Leopoldville, in 1947. It was among the first handful Congolese recording companies producing music for the African market. Bowane had come to "Leo" in the mid 1940s, seen bands like that of Wendo, and returned to his home town to found his own big band, Victoria Coquilhatville. In 1947 he returned Leopoldville and quickly rose in the music scene. While Both he and Wendo were singers and guitarists, Jéronimidis saw their strengths, putting Wendo on lead vocals and giving Bowane free range on his long cascading guitar lines. These long bridges, developed out of earlier Congolese folk styles, were called Sebene, reputedly because of the Seventh chords favoured by Congolese musicians. The shout "Sebene!" often preceded these long guitar solos, first popularised by Bowane.

=== Marie-Louise ===
Although Wendo had already established himself among the first generation of Congolese musicians, Bowane's first hit with Wendo was also the more established musician's first huge hit. The song, the first truly international hit of Congolese Rumba, was "Marie-Louise", co-written in 1948 by Wendo Kolosoy and Henri Bowane. Through the publicity of Radio Congolia, along with the controversy which followed the song (a back-and-forth between Wendo and Henri over Wendo's pursuit of a girl, thwarted by Henri's wealth, with salacious undertones), the song became a success throughout West Africa. With its success came trouble: the song had "satanic" powers attributed to it by Catholic religious leaders. Stories from the time even claimed that the song, if played at midnight, could raise the dead. The furor drove Wendo out of Kinshasa, and resulted in a brief imprisonment by the Belgian authorities in Stanleyville and his excommunication from the Catholic Church. The combination of African lyrics and vocals with Afro-Cuban son rhythms and instrumentation spawned one of the most successful African musical genres: Congolese rumba. Wendo's time on the ferries also contributed to his success as one of the first "national" artists of the DRC: he learned the music of the ethnic groups up and down the river, and later sang not only in his native tongue of Kikongo, but also in fluent Lingala and Swahili.

== Congolese rumba in the 1950s ==
The success of this new music rested upon the burgeoning radio stations and record industry of late colonial Leopoldville, which often piped music over loudspeakers into the African quarters, called the "Cite". A handful of African clubs (closing early with a 9:30 pm curfew for non-Europeans) like "Congo Bar" provided venues, along with occasional gigs at the upscale white clubs of the European quarter, "La ville". The importation of European and American 78 rpm records into Africa in the 1930s and 1940s (called G.V. Series records) featured much Cuban music, a style that was enjoyed by cosmopolitan Europeans and Africans alike. One writer has argued that this music, sophisticated, based on Africa music, and not produced by white colonialists especially appealed to Africans in general, and newly urban Congolese in particular. Greek and Lebanese merchants, a fixture in colonial Francophone Africa were amongst the first to bring recording and record pressing equipment to tropical Africa. Jéronimidis' "Ngoma" company was one of the first and most successful. Jéronimidis and the musicians, barnstormed around Belgian Congo in a brightly painted Ngoma van, performing and selling records. The music culture this created not only propelled Congolese Rumba to fame, but began to develop a national culture for the first time.

At the beginning of the 1950s, while Wendo remained with Ngoma, Bowane moved on the Jéronimidis' new label, Loningisa. Bowane became the dominant musical influence on the label as he moved out of centre stage and into the role of producer, writer, and owner-impresario of the premier nightclub of Leopoldville, Quint. Bowane is remembered as the most successful African musician of his time: he reputed to have been the first black man in Belgian Congo to own a Cadillac.

== Later career ==
In 1976 he founded the record label Ryco Jazz, and also recorded his only solo album, Double Take – Tala Kaka.

== Discography ==
Albums

- Double Take, Tala Kaka (1976, Ryco Jazz)

Contributing artist

- The Rough Guide to Congo Gold (2008, World Music Network)
