= G.V. Series =

Series of historical Afro-Cuban gramophone records

A G.V. Series (G.V.116) recording of the 1941 songs "El estagiario / Mi refugio" by Argentine Carlos Di Sarli y su Orquesta típica. Thousands of such records were sent to colonial Africa in the 1940s, sparking the creation of new musical styles across the continent.

The G.V. Series (perhaps for Grabación Victor) were a series of 10 inch 78 rpm Gramophone records produced in Europe and the United States from 1933 to 1958, and exported (or repressed on site) to colonial Tropical Africa. They are credited with introducing Afro-Cuban music into modern African popular culture. The resulting re-interpretations influenced the creation of several genres of African popular music.

== The Series ==
Over 250 titles (double sided records) were produced in the G.V. Series. The records were launched by the British EMI company's His Master's Voice label in 1933, in part because of shrinking demand during the Great Depression. In the 1940s, His Master's Voice reached agreement with other companies, such as RCA Victor to share the royalties of their artists in the production of G.V. Series recordings. Thereafter local distributors were able to request, or press themselves, any of the back catalog of these companies for relatively low cost in Africa, making the records affordable to African listeners for the first time.

At the same time in West Africa (what became Nigeria and Ghana, specifically) EMI was recording and releasing Sakara, Juju and Apala music on 78 rpm discs in the Parlophone B, His Master's Voice JL, His Master's Voice JZ and Decca WA/GWA/NGA series (1947–52), as well as His Master's Voice owned local labels, such as Ghana's Taymani Special. While there were also domestic record producers beginning to appear in Anglophone West Africa, Francophone Central African music was based on the twin poles of small domestic labels of the 1940s and 50s, and the Latin music supplied by the G.V. Series records and later competitors from Pathé Marconi and Decca. Anglophone West Africa also had twin advantages of having had access to domestic recording and the distribution across West Africa of these recordings by the His Master's Voice owned Zonophone label of African music from 1928.

== Cuban music in Africa ==
While the G.V. Series drew on a wide back catalogue of music, they are best known as the first exposure many Africans had to Afro-Cuban music (specifically Son and Son montuno). Some musicians of the era still refer to these songs not by the Spanish language titles but by the G.V. numbers of their records.

Nine initial G.V. records were released in 1933, drawn from EMI's back catalogue of '"general ethnic" or "Spanish" recordings, with G.V. 1 being "The Peanut Vendor" by Don Azpiazu & his Havana Casino Orchestra, recorded New York City, 13 May 1930. Of particular note were Cuban artists such as Son combo Sexteto Habanero, Trio Matamoros, Don Azpiazú, Abelardo Valdés, Antonio Machin, as well as big band leader Xavier Cugat, originally recorded in the United States for the American market.

These records spawned some of the most successful modern musical styles West Africa, Central Africa, and East Africa. The most notable of these styles is Congolese Rumba ("Soukous") which developed in Leopoldville, Belgian Congo (modern Kinshasa, DRC) in the 1940s and 50s. The guitar styles of Highlife music in British colonial West Africa were also highly influenced by these records, as were the stylings of the Dakar sound in Senegal. African guitar playing in general, and the electric guitar in particular, was popularised in part by the music distributed in the G.V. Series records. The music of East Africa was also influenced by the G.V. series, sold through East African Music Stores in Nairobi as its agents in Lourenço Marques and Dar-es-Salaam. But here too, the Cuban musics of the G.V. series quickly had to complete with domestic music produced by EMI and specialist labels like Odeon Swahili.
