= Adou Elenga =

Congolese musician

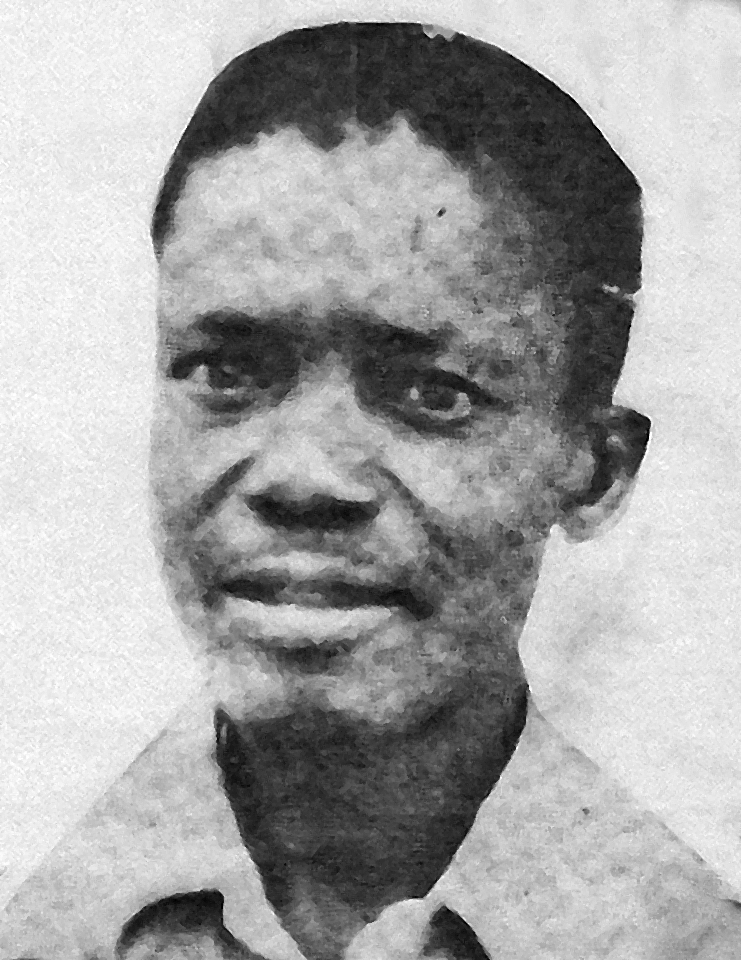

Background information
- Born: 1926; Watsa, Belgian Congo
- Died: 4 August 1981 (aged 55) Kinshasa, Zaire
- Genre: Congolese rumba
- Occupation: Singer-songwriter
- Instrument: Guitar
- Label: Ngoma

Adou Elenga (1926 – 4 August 1981) was a Congolese singer-songwriter, composer and guitarist. Signed on the Ngoma label since 1950, during his musical career, he composed several hits such as "Mokili Ekobaluka", which is his best known. The song is considered by Congolese as a prophecy of their independence. Other hits are "Maria Tchebo", "Pyramide", "Tout Le Monde Samedi Soir". His music was covered by many artists, including Sam Mangwana and Bopol Mansiamina.

== Early life ==
Elenga was born in Watsa, Haut-Uélé in 1926. His father, Mohamed, of Zanzibar origin, was a guitarist. His mother, Amba, was a Congolese precisely from the Tetela tribe.

Adou Elenga began his musical career in 1939. With the help of his brother Saidi Mambuleo, in 1947 at the age of 21, he learned to play the guitar. Later, he composed his first song, "Kumambele".

== Musical career ==
In 1950, he joined Editions Ngoma label, run by Greek producer Nicolas Jeronimidis. The following year he recorded his first single "Pyramide/Maria Tchebo" and later "Aminatou/Tout Le Monde Samedi Soir".

Elenga's French adaptation of "Bobo Waro Fero Satodeh", "Tout Le Monde Samedi Soir" was covered by several artists including Ousmane M'Baye and Sheila. Congolese guitarist Bopol Mansiamina also covered Elenga's adaptation. Congolese singer Evoloko Jocker included a short lyric from the song. Later in 1979, "Maria Tchebo" was covered by singer Sam Mangwana as "Maria Tebbo".

=== Ata Ndele ===
In 1954, Elenga recorded several songs for the Ngoma label, including "O Likouleo" with Louis Mousaidi and the Groupe Rythmique Ngoma. The B-side of the shellac contained Elenga's timeless hit "Mokili Ekobaluka", better known as "Ata Ndele". The song was a call for decolonization and was aimed at the Belgian colonial authorities, who censored it and sent Elenga to jail.

"Ata ndele mokili ekobaluka, ata ndele mondele akosukwama", lingala for "Sooner or later the world will change, sooner or later the whites will be kicked out."

To this day, many Congolese consider the song to be a prophecy of the independence of the Congo, which took place in 1960.

== Death ==
Adou Elenga died on 4 August 1981, at the Makala Sanatorium, Kinshasa, after being diagnosed with chronic tuberculosis. He was aged 55.

== Partial discography ==
Singles

- Pyramide/Maria Tchebo
- Aminatou/Tout Le Monde Samedi Soir
- Bandeladie Kongo/Eyaye Wantulala
- Mina Kwenda Kisangani/Yolele Sika Monene
- Kumambele/Eyamba
- O Likouleo/Mokili Ekobaluka

Contributing artist

- Anthologie de la Musique Zaïroise moderne [tome 1–2] (1974, Bureau du Président de la République du Zaïre)
