= Zacharie Elenga =

- Also known as: Jhimmy
- Born: Zacharie Elenga; 1926; Brazzaville
- Died: 1990 (aged 64) Bangui, Central African Republic
- Genres: Congolese rumba
- Instrument: Guitar
- Labels: Opika and His Master's Voice

Zacharie Elenga (1926 – 1990) was a virtuoso guitarist and one of the founding fathers of modern Congolese music. His unique style of playing led him to be popularly known as Jhimmy the Hawaiian (Jhimmy L'Hawaïenne), or simply Jhimmy.

Born in Brazzaville to a Congolese father and a mother from the Ubangi-Shari territory of Central African Republic, Zacharie Elenga initially had plans for the priesthood, but it is said that he had a fiery temperament and he was likely expelled from seminary by the priests. Subsequently, he found employment, as a stenographer with the firm Solbena, a workshop that manufactured shirts, and was owned by Greek brothers Gabriel and Moussa Benathar. The Benathar brothers were proprietors of a number of businesses in the Belgian Congo and fortuitously they decided to launch the Opika recording company in challenge to the monopolistic Ngoma record label.

In 1947, Elenga had been living in the Usoke Street area near Leopoldville's city center, and it was there that he met Paul Mwanga. The two formed a musical collaboration named, "Groupe Jhimmy na Mwanga" (The Jhimmy and Mwanga Group), with Elenga playing rhythm guitar and Mwanga contributing vocals. The Benathar brothers had found ready stars in the Zacharie Elenga and Paul Mwanga duo, and they were signed almost as soon as Opika's doors opened in 1949. Elenga had a unique way of stringing his guitar, choosing to replace the D string with a second E string, and picking the notes with his thumb and forefinger in a style that he called, "Hawaiian". Further, Zacharie Elenga named himself after American country legend Jimmy Rodgers, who he admired, but spelling Jhimmy with an "h". Hence he came to be known amongst his fans as Jhimmy the Hawaiian.

While at Opika, Jhimmy joined a quintet including Paul Mwanga on vocals, Georges Doula, Albert Yamba-Yamba, and Francois 'Gobi' Boyimbo on guitars, and Etienne 'Baskis' Diluvila on percussion. In his first recording at Opika, "Ondruwe", Jhimmy introduced the foxtrot to the Congolese public. This record with the song "Henriette" on the reverse side, featured Paul Mwana's fine voice singing solo, but it was Jhimmy's innovative playing style and advanced, harmonious composition that had substantial influence on other performers of the time. Between the years of 1950 and 1952 Jhimmy saw great success in his musical career, with popular fame reaching as far west as Gabon. He was even featured in a short film of the time, which was shown in Europe, called Jhimmy Chante (Jhimmy sings). In 1952, Jhimmy collaborated on some recordings with another Opika performer named Joseph Kabaselle, but these were to be the swan songs of his career and shortly after this he slipped into obscurity, never to record again.
