= Ngoma (record label) =

Congolese record label

- Founded: 1948
- Founder: Nicolas Jéronimidis
- Status: Defunct
- Genre: African music
- Country of origin: Belgian Congo (now Democratic Republic of the Congo)
- Location: Léopoldville (now Kinshasa)
- Official website: ngomarecords.com

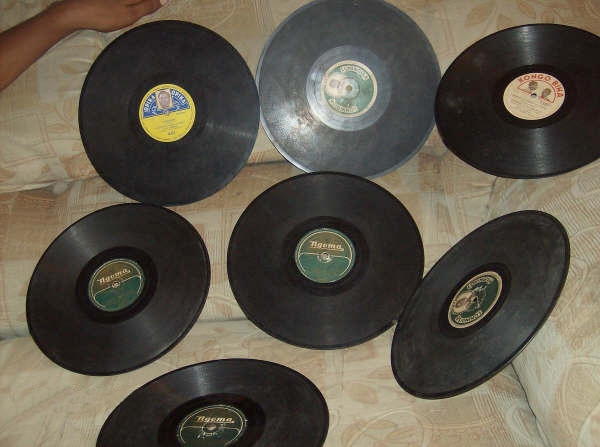
Old Congolese 78 rpm records. The three on the lower left are examples of Ngoma discs.

Ngoma was one of the first record labels intended to provide local African music to the people of the Democratic Republic of the Congo. The name Ngoma came from the Kikongo word for drum. The label was created in 1948 by the Greek businessman Nicolas Jéronimidis, and was active until 1968. Its catalog included many known artists at that time including Camille Feruzi, who is said to have popularized rumba during the 1930s, Antoine Wendo Kolosoy, one of the biggest names of all-time in Congolese music, the Angolan Manuel d'Oliveira, Léon Bukasa, Antoine Mundanda, Paul Mwanga and Albert Luampasi, the guitarist who is said to have taught the famous Congolese musician François Luambo Makiadi (Franco) his first guitar chords.

== See also ==
- List of record labels
